= Our Gang filmography =

The following is a complete list of the 220 Our Gang short films produced by Hal Roach Studios and/or Metro-Goldwyn-Mayer between 1922 and 1944, numbered by order of release along with production order.

1922 - 1923 - 1924 - 1925 - 1926 - 1927 - 1928 - 1929 - 1930 - 1931
1932 - 1933 - 1934 - 1935 - 1936 - 1937 - 1938 - 1939 - 1940 - 1941 - 1942 - 1943 - 1944

== The Roach/Pathé silents (1922–1928) ==
These two-reel silent Our Gang shorts were produced by Hal Roach Studios and distributed to theaters by Pathé.

=== 1922 ===
Release#	Production#	Film	Director	Original release date	Notes/Content edits for television
001	004	One Terrible Day	Charles Parrott; Robert McGowan; Tom McNamara	September 10	First appearance of Allen "Farina" Hoskins, Jackie Condon, Mickey Daniels, Jack Davis, and Ernie Morrison. First Our Gang short released, fourth to be produced.; Filmed in-between Young Sherlocks and A Quiet Street.
002	002	Fire Fighters	Charles Parrott; Robert McGowan; Tom McNamara	October 8	Filmed in between Our Gang and Young Sherlocks.; Remade as The Fourth Alarm! (1926) and Hook and Ladder (1932).
003	001	Our Gang	Charles Parrott; Fred Newmeyer; Robert McGowan; Tom McNamara	November 5	First short to be produced.; Original version directed by Newmeyer; reshoots by McNamara and McGowan after One Terrible Day and Fire Fighters.
004	003	Young Sherlocks	Charles Parrott; Robert McGowan; Tom McNamara	November 26	Filmed in between Fire Fighters and One Terrible Day.
005	006	Saturday Morning	Tom McNamara; Robert McGowan	December 3	Filmed in between A Quiet Street and The Big Show.
006	005	A Quiet Street	Tom McNamara; Robert McGowan	December 31	Filmed in between One Terrible Day and Saturday Morning.
=== 1923 ===
Release#	Production#	Film	Director	Original release date	Notes/Content edits for television
007	009	The Champeen	Robert McGowan	January 28	First appearance of Joe Cobb, Mary Kornman and Andy Samuel.; Filmed in between The Cobbler and Boys to Board.; Remade as Boxing Gloves (1929).
008	008	The Cobbler	Tom McNamara	February 18	Joe Cobb does not appear.
009	007	The Big Show	Robert McGowan	February 25	Filmed in between Saturday Morning and The Cobbler.
010	011	A Pleasant Journey	Robert McGowan	March 18	Filmed in between Boys to Board and Giants Vs. Yanks.
011	010	Boys to Board	Tom McNamara	April 8	Final short directed by Tom McNamara; Mary Kornman does not appear.; Filmed in between The Champeen! and A Pleasant Journey.
012	012	Giants vs. Yanks	Robert McGowan	May 13	Filmed in between A Pleasant Journey and Back Stage.; Mary Kornman does not appear.
013	013	Back Stage	Robert McGowan	June 3	Mary Kornman does not appear.
014	014	Dogs of War!	Robert McGowan	July 1	With Harold Lloyd, Jobyna Ralston.
015	015	Lodge Night	Robert McGowan	July 29	Filmed in between Dogs of War! and early filming of Fast Company.
016	018	July Days	Robert McGowan	August 26	Filmed in between Stage Fright and Sunday Calm.
017	020	No Noise	Robert McGowan	September 23	Filmed in between Sunday Calm and Derby Day.
018	017	Stage Fright	Robert McGowan	October 21	Filmed in between early production of Fast Company and July Days.
019	021	Derby Day	Robert McGowan	November 18	Filmed in between No Noise and Tire Trouble.
020	019	Sunday Calm	Robert McGowan	December 16	Final appearance of Jack Davis, save for Fast Company.; Mary Kornman does not appear.; Filmed in between July Days and No Noise.
=== 1924 ===
Release#	Production#	Film	Director	Original release date	Notes/Content edits for television
021	022	Tire Trouble	Robert McGowan	January 13	
022	023	Big Business	Robert McGowan	February 10	Andy Samuel is promoted from supporting player to replacement for Jack Davis.
023	024	The Buccaneers	Robert McGowan; Mark Goldaine	March 9	
024	025	Seein' Things	Robert McGowan	April 6	
025	026	Commencement Day	Robert McGowan; Mark Goldaine	May 4	
026	028	Cradle Robbers	Robert McGowan	June 1	Andy Samuel does not appear.; Filmed in between It's a Bear and Jubilo, Jr.; Remade as Forgotten Babies (1933).
027	029	Jubilo, Jr.	Robert McGowan	June 29	With Will Rogers and Charley Chase; Filmed in between Cradle Robbers and High Society. As a result, Ernie Morrison does not appear.
028	027	It's a Bear	Robert McGowan	July 24	Final appearance of Ernie Morrison, save for Fast Company.; Andy Samuel does not appear.
029	030	High Society	Robert McGowan	August 24	
030	031	The Sun Down Limited	Robert McGowan	September 21	Partially remade as Railroadin' (1929).
031	032	Every Man for Himself	Robert McGowan	October 19	
032	016	Fast Company	Robert McGowan; Charles Parrott	November 16	Shot in spring 1923 with reshoots in summer 1924, features Ernie Morrison and Jack Davis.; Originally filmed in between Lodge Night and Stage Fright.
033	033	The Mysterious Mystery!	Robert McGowan	December 14	First appearance of Eugene Jackson; Final appearance of Andy Samuel.
=== 1925 ===
Release#	Production#	Film	Director	Original release date	Notes/Content edits for television
034	034	The Big Town	Robert McGowan	January 11	
035	035	Circus Fever	Robert McGowan	February 8	First appearance of Johnny Downs.
036	036	Dog Days	Robert McGowan	March 8	
037	037	The Love Bug	Robert McGowan	April 5	
038	039	Shootin' Injuns	Robert McGowan	May 3	Final appearance of Eugene Jackson; Johnny Downs is now promoted from a supporting player to a replacement for Andy Samuel.
039	038	Ask Grandma	Robert McGowan	May 31	Filmed in between The Love Bug and Shootin' Injuns.
040	040	Official Officers	Robert McGowan	June 28	With James Finlayson; Filmed in between Shootin' Injuns and Mary, Queen of Tots.
041	042	Boys Will Be Joys	Robert McGowan	July 26	First appearance of Jay R. Smith.; Filmed in between Mary, Queen of Tots and Better Movies.
042	041	Mary, Queen of Tots	Robert McGowan	August 23	With James Finlayson; Johnny Downs does not appear.
043	044	Your Own Back Yard	Robert McGowan	September 27	Filmed in between Better Movies and One Wild Ride.
044	043	Better Movies	Robert McGowan	November 1	First appearance of Bobby "Bonedust" Young.; Jay R. Smith is now a main player.
045	045	One Wild Ride	Robert McGowan	December 6	Filmed in between Your Own Back Yard and Good Cheer.; Jay R. Smith does not appear.; Remade in 1932 as Free Wheeling.
=== 1926 ===
Release#	Production#	Film	Director	Original release date	Notes/Content edits for television
046	046	Good Cheer	Robert McGowan	January 26	With Charlie Hall
047	047	Buried Treasure	Robert McGowan	February 14	With Charlie Hall
048	048	Monkey Business	Robert McGowan	March 21	With Charlie Hall
049	049	Baby Clothes	Robert McGowan	April 25	With Charlie Hall; Jay R. Smith does not appear.
050	050	Uncle Tom's Uncle	Robert McGowan	May 30	Bobby Young is now a main player.
051	051	Thundering Fleas	Robert McGowan	July 18	First appearance of Mildred Kornman and Scooter Lowry.; Final appearance of Mickey Daniels; With Charley Chase, James Finlayson, Charlie Hall, and Oliver Hardy
052	052	Shivering Spooks	Robert McGowan	August 8	
053	053	The Fourth Alarm	Robert McGowan	September 12	Final appearance of Mary Kornman.; Remake of Fire Fighters; remade as Hook and Ladder (1932).
054	054	War Feathers	Robert McGowan; Anthony Mack	November 21	
055	056	Telling Whoppers	Robert McGowan; Anthony Mack	December 19	Filmed in between Seeing the World and Bring Home the Turkey.
=== 1927 ===
Release#	Production#	Film	Director	Original release date	Notes/Content edits for television
056	057	Bring Home the Turkey	Robert McGowan; Anthony Mack	January 16	First appearance of Jean Darling; Bobby "Bonedust" Young does not appear.
057	055	Seeing the World	Robert McGowan; Anthony Mack	February 13	With Stan Laurel and James Finlayson.; Bobby "Bonedust" Young does not appear.; Johnny Downs' last appearance, save for a guest appearance in Chicken Feed.
058	058	Ten Years Old	Anthony Mack	March 13	Filmed in between Bring Home the Turkey and Love My Dog; Remade as Birthday Blues (1932).
059	059	Love My Dog	Robert McGowan	April 17	Remade as The Pooch (1932).
060	060	Tired Business Men	Anthony Mack; Charles Oelze	May 15	
061	061	Baby Brother	Anthony Mack; Charles Oelze	June 26	First appearance of Bobby "Wheezer" Hutchins.; With Oliver Hardy
062	064	The Glorious Fourth	Robert McGowan	June 26	With Charley Chase; Filmed in between Olympic Games and Playin' Hooky.; First appearance of Harry Spear and Pete the Pup.; Jean Darling, Bobby "Wheezer" Hutchins, Scooter Lowry, and Bobby Young do not appear.
063	063	Olympic Games	Anthony Mack	September 11	Filmed in between Chicken Feed and The Glorious Fourth.; Jean Darling, Scooter Lowry, and Bobby "Bonedust" Young do not appear.
066	062	Chicken Feed	Anthony Mack; Charles Oelze	November 6	With Johnny Downs.; Last appearance of Scooter Lowry and Bobby "Bonedust" Young. Young would later return as a supporting player, first in 1928, and again in 1930.; Pete the Pup does not appear.; Released in between The Old Wallop and Heebee Jeebees.; Remade as A Lad An' A Lamp (1932).
=== 1928 ===
Release#	Production#	Film	Director	Original release date	Notes/Content edits for television
069	065	Playin' Hookey	Anthony Mack	January 1	Filmed in between The Glorious Fourth and The Smile Wins.
072	066	The Smile Wins	Robert McGowan	February 26	Jean Darling and Bobby "Wheezer" Hutchins do not appear.

== The Roach/MGM silents (1927–1929) ==
These silent Our Gang shorts were produced by Hal Roach Studios and distributed to theaters by Metro-Goldwyn-Mayer. All films are two reels (20 minutes) long, except Spook Spoofing, which is three reels (30 minutes) long.

=== 1927 ===
Release#	Production#	Film	Director	Original release date	Notes/Content edits for television
064	067	Yale vs. Harvard	Robert McGowan	September 24	Currently lost.
065	068	The Old Wallop	Robert McGowan	October 22	
067	069	Heebee Jeebees	Robert McGowan; Anthony Mack	November 19	Currently lost.
068	070	Dog Heaven	Anthony Mack	December 17	Harry Spear does not appear.
=== 1928 ===
Release#	Production#	Film	Director	Original release date	Notes/Content edits for television
070	071	Spook–Spoofing	Robert McGowan	January 14	While running the standard length of a two-reeler (20 minutes), this film was also released as a three-reeler.; Jean Darling does not appear.
071	072	Rainy Days	Anthony Mack	February 11	
073	073	Edison, Marconi & Co.	Anthony Mack	March 10	Currently lost.; Jean Darling and Mildred Kornman do not appear.
074	074	Barnum & Ringling, Inc.	Robert McGowan	April 7	With Oliver Hardy; Mildred Kornman does not appear.
075	075	Fair and Muddy	Charley Oelze	May 5	With Bobby "Bonedust" Young.; Last appearance of Mildred Kornman.
076	076	Crazy House	Robert McGowan	June 2	First appearance of Mary Ann Jackson
077	077	Growing Pains	Anthony Mack	September 22	Currently lost.; Last appearance of Jackie Condon and Jay R. Smith for the time being. Both would return for Election Day.
078	078	The Ol' Gray Hoss	Anthony Mack	October 20	
079	079	School Begins	Anthony Mack	November 17	A copy exists in the Museum of Modern Art in New York.
080	080	The Spanking Age	Robert McGowan	December 15	First silent Our Gang short released with a synchronized music and sound effects disc.; Rediscovered in 1990.
=== 1929 ===
Release#	Production#	Film	Director	Original release date	Notes/Content edits for television
081	081	Election Day	Anthony Mack	January 12	Jackie Condon and Jay R. Smith return.; Final appearance of Jackie Condon.; Final appearance of Jay R. Smith as a main player. He would appear as a supporting player in two more shorts.; Jean Darling does not appear.
082	082	Noisy Noises	Robert McGowan	February 9	Released with synchronized music and sound effects, on disc only.; With Jay R. Smith.
083	083	The Holy Terror	Anthony Mack	March 9	Currently lost.; Released with synchronized music track.
084	084	Wiggle Your Ears	Robert McGowan	April 6	Released with synchronized music and sound effects, on disc only.
085	085	Fast Freight	Robert McGowan	May 9	With James Finlayson
087	086	Little Mother	Robert McGowan	June 1	
091	087	Cat, Dog & Co.	Anthony Mack	September 14	Released with synchronized music and sound effects, on disc only.
093	088	Saturday's Lesson	Robert McGowan	November 9	Released with synchronized music and sound effects, on disc only.

== The Roach/MGM talkies (1929–1938, The Little Rascals) ==
The Our Gang sound shorts were produced by Hal Roach Studios and distributed by Metro-Goldwyn-Mayer. These 80 films, with some removed due to content concerns, were later packaged and syndicated by King World Productions under the title The Little Rascals.

The shorts produced up until Arbor Day (1936) were two reels in length, typically running 17 to 20 minutes. The exception is Small Talk, which extended to three reels (26 minutes). From 1936's Bored of Education to 1938's Hide and Shriek the shorts were reduced to one reel, approximately 10 minutes each, except for Our Gang Follies of 1938 which was a one-shot return to the two-reel format. In 1936, the feature-length film General Spanky was also released.

Over the years, many of the shorts were edited for television, and King World Productions excluded several from The Little Rascals television package. The shorts that were either edited or withheld from broadcast are noted accordingly.

=== 1929 ===
Release#	Production#	Film	Director	Original release date	Notes/Content edits for television
086	089	Small Talk	Robert McGowan	May 18	First sound film; release dates of first five sound shorts overlap with those of final three silents shorts.; Television prints heavily edited for time and sound quality. Initially in the Little Rascals television package, but eliminated in the early 1980s due to sound quality.; Released as a three-reel (thirty minute) short.
088	090	Railroadin'	Robert McGowan	June 15	First appearance of Norman "Chubby" Chaney.; Cameo by director Robert F. McGowan; Never shown on television because the film's sound track, released only on separate phonographic records, was presumed lost since the mid-1940s. Railroadin's sound track turned up in the MGM vaults in 1982; while it was released on home video, it never became part of the television package.
089	092	Lazy Days	Robert McGowan	August 24	Withdrawn from television package due to racial humor involving African-Americans.; Filmed in between Boxing Gloves and Bouncing Babies
090	091	Boxing Gloves	Anthony Mack	September 9	First appearance of Jackie Cooper, appearing at this point as a supporting player.; Final appearance of Joe Cobb; Television prints edited due to time and to add sound to originally silent scenes.; Filmed in between Railroadin' and Lazy Days.; Motion picture trade journals from 1929 give this film's release date as July 13, 1929.
092	093	Bouncing Babies	Robert McGowan	October 12	Final appearances of Jean Darling and Harry Spear.; Joe Cobb was credited to have been on this film and may appear in a Halloween costume.; Television prints edited due to content considered in bad taste.
094	094	Moan and Groan, Inc.	Robert McGowan	December 7	With Edgar Kennedy and Max Davidson.; Final appearance of Jay R. Smith.; Jackie Cooper is promoted to main player status.; Withdrawn from television package due to racial/ethnic humor involving Jewish-Americans and African Americans.
=== 1930 ===
Release#	Production#	Film	Director	Original release date	Notes/Content edits for television
095	095	Shivering Shakespeare	Anthony Mack	January 25	With Edgar Kennedy; First appearance of supporting players Donald Haines, Douglas Greer, and Georgie Billings.; Television prints edited due to content considered in bad taste.; Last short directed by Anthony Mack.
096	096	The First Seven Years	Robert McGowan	March 1	With Edgar Kennedy; Television prints edited for racial humor involving African Americans.
097	097	When the Wind Blows	James W. Horne	April 5	With Edgar Kennedy; First "Our Gang" short released with background music.; Television prints edited due to racial humor involving African Americans.
098	098	Bear Shooters	Robert McGowan	May 17	With Leon Janney.; Television prints edited due to content considered in bad taste, as well as racial humor involving African Americans.
099	099	A Tough Winter	Robert McGowan	June 21	With Stepin Fetchit; Withdrawn from television package due to racial humor involving African-Americans.; Last appearance of the original Pete the Pup.
100	100	Pups Is Pups	Robert McGowan	August 30	First entry for 1930 – 31 film season.; First appearances of main player Dorothy DeBorba, supporting player Buddy McDonald, and the second Pete the Pup.; First Our Gang film to feature incidental music by Leroy Shield.; Selected for preservation in the United States National Film Registry by the Library of Congress.; Television prints edited due to racial humor involving African Americans and for stereotyping of other people.
101	101	Teacher's Pet	Robert McGowan	October 11	First appearance of Matthew Beard.; First appearance of June Marlowe as schoolteacher Miss Crabtree.; First appearance of the Our Gang theme song, "Good Old Days".; Pete the Pup does not appear.; Television prints edited due to content considered in bad taste.
102	102	School's Out	Robert McGowan	November 22	With June Marlowe and Bobby "Bonedust" Young.; Television prints edited due to stereotyping of women and racial humor involving African Americans.
=== 1931 ===
Release#	Production#	Film	Director	Original release date	Notes/Content edits for television
103	103	Helping Grandma	Robert McGowan	January 3	With Bobby "Bonedust" Young.; First appearance of Shirley Jean Rickert; Pete the Pup does not appear.; Television prints edited due to racial humor involving African Americans.
104	104	Love Business	Robert McGowan	February 14	With June Marlowe and Bobby "Bonedust" Young.; Television prints edited due to racial humor involving African Americans.
105	105	Little Daddy	Robert McGowan	March 28	Final appearance of Bobby "Bonedust" Young.; With June Marlowe; Withdrawn from television package due to racial humor involving African-Americans.
106	106	Bargain Day	Robert McGowan	May 2	Final appearance of Jackie Cooper.; Television prints edited due to racial humor involving African Americans.
107	107	Fly My Kite	Robert McGowan	May 30	Final appearances of Allen "Farina" Hoskins, Mary Ann Jackson, Norman "Chubby" Chaney, Shirley Jean Rickert.; First appearance of supporting player Dickie Jackson.; With Mae Busch.; Television prints edited due to racial humor involving African Americans.
108	108	Big Ears	Robert McGowan	August 29	First entry for 1931 – 32 film season.; First appearance of Sherwood Bailey; Withdrawn from television package for centering on divorce.
109	109	Shiver My Timbers	Robert McGowan	October 10	First appearance of Jerry Tucker, who wouldn't return until 1933.; With Billy Gilbert and June Marlowe; Television prints edited for verbal descriptions of violence.
110	110	Dogs Is Dogs	Robert McGowan	November 21	With Billy Gilbert.; Television prints edited due to negative treatment toward children and racial humor involving African Americans.
=== 1932 ===
Release#	Production#	Film	Director	Original release date	Notes/Content edits for television
111	111	Readin' and Writin'	Robert McGowan	January 2	First appearance of Kendall "Breezy Brisbane" McComas.; Final appearance of June Marlowe.; Television prints edited due to racial humor involving African Americans and content deemed to be in bad taste.
112	112	Free Eats	Raymond McCarey	February 13	With Billy Gilbert; First appearance of George "Spanky" McFarland.
113	113	Spanky	Robert McGowan	March 26	With Billy Gilbert.; Television prints edited due to racial humor involving African Americans.
114	114	Choo-Choo!	Robert McGowan	May 7	First appearance of Wally Albright and Harold "Bouncy" Wertz.; Television prints edited due to content deemed to be in bad taste.; Semi-remake of A Pleasant Journey.
115	115	The Pooch	Robert McGowan	June 11	Final appearance of the second Pete the Pup.; Television prints edited due to negative treatment toward children and racial humor involving African Americans.
116	116	Hook and Ladder	Robert McGowan	August 27	First entry for 1932 – 33 film season.; First appearance of Dickie Moore and the third Pete the Pup.; Final appearances of Sherwood Bailey, Harold "Bouncy" Wertz, and supporting player Buddy McDonald.; Bobby "Wheezer" Hutchins does not appear.; Semi-remake of Fire Fighters and The Fourth Alarm.
117	117	Free Wheeling	Robert McGowan	October 1	Bobby "Wheezer" Hutchins and Pete the Pup do not appear.; Television prints edited due to stereotyping of women and racial humor involving African Americans.; Semi-remake of One Wild Ride.
118	118	Birthday Blues	Robert McGowan	November 12	Final appearances of Kendall "Breezy Brisbane" McComas; Bobby "Wheezer" Hutchins does not appear.; Television prints edited due to negative treatment toward children and racial humor involving African Americans.; Semi-remake of Ten Years Old.
119	119	A Lad an' a Lamp	Robert McGowan	December 17	First appearance of supporting player John Collum; Withdrawn from television package due to racial humor involving African-Americans.; Semi-remake of Chicken Feed.
=== 1933 ===
Release#	Production#	Film	Director	Original release date	Notes/Content edits for television
120	120	Fish Hooky	Robert McGowan	January 28	Features "Our Gang Graduates" Allen "Farina" Hoskins, Mickey Daniels, Mary Kornman, Joe Cobb; Final appearance of supporting player Donald Haines; Amusement park scenes filmed at Santa Monica Pier, providing a historic record of rides and attractions of the era.
121	121	Forgotten Babies	Robert McGowan	March 11	First appearance of Tommy Bond.; Semi-remake of Cradle Robbers.
122	122	The Kid From Borneo	Robert McGowan	April 15	Withdrawn from television package due to racial humor and negative treatment of handicapped people.
123	123	Mush and Milk	Robert McGowan	May 27	Final appearances of Bobby "Wheezer" Hutchins, Dorothy DeBorba, Dickie Moore, and supporting player Dickie Jackson.; With James Finlayson.; Television prints edited due to negative treatment of children and negative misconceptions of the elderly.
124	124	Bedtime Worries	Robert McGowan	September 9	First entry for 1933 – 34 film season.; With Emerson Treacy and Gay Seabrook.; Jerry Tucker returns.
125	125	Wild Poses	Robert McGowan	October 28	With Emerson Treacy, Gay Seabrook, Franklin Pangborn, Stan Laurel, Oliver Hardy; Production hiatus until early 1934 following this short.
=== 1934 ===
Release#	Production#	Film	Director	Original release date	Notes/Content edits for television
126	126	Hi'-Neighbor!	Gus Meins	March 3	First appearance of Scotty Beckett and Jackie Lynn Taylor.; Television prints edited due to scenes deemed to be in bad taste.; Remade as Three Men in a Tub in 1938.
127	127	For Pete's Sake!	Gus Meins	April 14	Willie Mae Taylor (a girl) plays "Buckwheat", who at first was a female character.; First appearance of Leonard Kibrick, Marianne Edwards, and Billie Thomas, all uncredited as general Our Gang kids. Later in the series, Billie Thomas would become famous for playing Buckwheat when the character was changed to male.; Jerry Tucker does not appear.; Television prints edited due to racial humor involving African Americans.
128	128	The First Round-Up	Gus Meins	May 5	Willie Mae Taylor (a girl) plays "Buckwheat", who at first was a female character, identified in this episode as "Stymie's kid sister". Billie Thomas, who would later become famous as Buckwheat when the gender was changed to a boy, appears briefly in this episode as a mischievous little boy emptying the gang's canteens.; Jerry Tucker, Leonard Kibrick, and Marianne Edwards do not appear.; Television prints edited due to racial humor involving African Americans.
129	129	Honky Donkey	Gus Meins	June 2	With Don Barclay; Willie Mae Taylor (a girl) again plays "Buckwheat".; Billie Thomas, Jerry Tucker, Leonard Kibrick, Marianne Edwards, Jackie Lynn Taylor, and Pete the Pup do not appear.
130	130	Mike Fright	Gus Meins	August 25	First entry for 1934 – 35 film season.; Joy Wurgaft appears as a Hula Dancer.; Wally Albright, Jerry Tucker, Jackie Lynn Taylor, Marianne Edwards, and Billie Thomas do not appear.
131	131	Washee Ironee	James Parrott	November 13	Final appearance of Wally Albright.; Only Our Gang film directed by Roach veteran James Parrott, who also appears in this film.; Marianne Edwards does not appear.; Tommy Bond departs series after this short; will return to Our Gang as "Butch" in 1937; Television prints edited due to racial humor involving Asian Americans.; Billie Thomas makes his third Our Gang appearance, but not yet as Buckwheat. He plays a football game spectator.
=== 1935 ===
Release#	Production#	Film	Director	Original release date	Notes/Content edits for television
132	132	Mama's Little Pirate	Gus Meins	January 5	Billie Thomas, a male, now plays "Buckwheat" wearing a dress. "Little Buckwheat" is referred to as "she".; Leonard Kibrick, Jackie Lynn Taylor, Marianne Edwards, and Pete the Pup do not appear.; Television prints edited due to racial humor involving African Americans.
133	133	Shrimps for a Day	Gus Meins	February 20	Final appearance of Jackie Lynn Taylor.; Pete the Pup does not appear.; Television prints edited due to racial humor involving African Americans.
134	134	Anniversary Trouble	Gus Meins	March 13	First appearance of Sidney Kibrick; Marianne Edwards does not appear.; With Johnny Arthur as John, Spanky's father; Hattie McDaniel as Mandy, the maid (both uncredited).; Television prints edited due to racial humor involving African Americans.
135	135	Beginner's Luck	Gus Meins	April 8	First appearance of Carl "Alfalfa" Switzer, Harold Switzer.; Leonard Kibrick does not appear.
136	136	Teacher's Beau	Gus Meins	April 27	Final appearance of Matthew "Stymie" Beard; Television prints edited due to racial humor involving African Americans.; Leonard and Sidney Kibrick do not appear.
137	137	Sprucin' Up	Gus Meins	June 1	Leonard and Sidney Kibrick do not appear.
138	139	Little Papa	Gus Meins	September 21	First appearance of Patsy May; First entry for 1935 – 36 film season.; Leonard Kibrick, Marianne Edwards, Jerry Tucker, and Pete the Pup do not appear.
139	140	Little Sinner	Gus Meins	October 26	First appearance of Eugene "Porky" Lee.; Scotty Beckett, Leonard Kibrick, Marianne Edwards, and Pete the Pup do not appear.; Withdrawn from television package from the early 1970s to early 1980s due to racial humor involving African-Americans. The short was later reinstated, though edited heavily for the same reasons.
140	141	Our Gang Follies of 1936	Gus Meins	November 30	With Dickie Jones.; First appearance of Darla Hood.; Joy Wurgaft Appears as a Supporting Cast.; Marianne Edwards and Pete the Pup do not appear.; Television prints edited due to racial humor involving African Americans.
=== 1936 ===
Release#	Production#	Film	Director	Original release date	Notes/Content edits for television
141	143	The Pinch Singer	Fred Newmeyer	January 4	Filmed in between Divot Diggers and Second Childhood.; Last short in which Jerry Tucker plays a supporting player. From here until 1938, he would only occasionally appear as an extra.; Sidney Kibrick also reduced to extra roles, until 1937.; Scotty Beckett does not appear.; Television prints edited due to racial humor involving African Americans.
142	142	Divot Diggers	Robert McGowan	February 8	Filmed in between Our Gang Follies of 1936 and The Pinch Singer; Scotty Beckett and Marianne Edwards do not appear.
143	138	The Lucky Corner	Gus Meins	March 14	Filmed in mid-1935 between Sprucin' Up and Little Papa, withheld for a year.; Final appearances of Leonard Kibrick, Marianne Edwards and Scotty Beckett, although the final filmed short Beckett shot was Follies of 1936.; Television prints edited due to racial humor involving African Americans.
144	144	Second Childhood	Gus Meins	April 11	With Zeffie Tilbury; Pete the Pup does not appear. Beginning with this short, Pete would begin to make fewer appearances in the series.
145	145	Arbor Day	Fred Newmeyer	May 2	Final regular two-reel short in series.; Eugene "Porky" Lee does not appear.; First appearance of Rosina Lawrence as schoolteacher Miss Lawrence.; With Hattie McDaniel.
146	146	Bored of Education	Gordon Douglas	August 20	First entry for 1936 – 37 film season.; First one-reel short in series.; With Rosina Lawrence.; One of Pete's few appearances during this period.; Winner of the 1937 Academy Award for Short Subjects (One-Reel).
147	147	Two Too Young	Gordon Douglas	September 26	With Rosina Lawrence.; Darla Hood does not appear.
148	148	Pay as You Exit	Gordon Douglas	October 24	Features "Our Gang Graduate" Joe Cobb.
149	149	Spooky Hooky	Gordon Douglas	December 5	With Rosina Lawrence and Dudley Dickerson.; Darla Hood does not appear.; Television prints edited due to racial humor involving African Americans.
=== 1937 ===
Release#	Production#	Film	Director	Original release date	Notes/Content edits for television
150	150	Reunion in Rhythm	Gordon Douglas	January 9	With Rosina Lawrence and "Our Gang Graduates" Mickey Daniels, Mary Kornman, Joe Cobb, Matthew "Stymie" Beard.; Television prints edited due to racial humor involving African Americans.
151	151	Glove Taps	Gordon Douglas	February 20	First appearances of Tommy Bond as "Butch", Sidney Kibrick as "The Woim" and Darwood "Waldo" Kaye.
152	152	Hearts Are Thumps	Gordon Douglas	April 3	First appearance of Shirley Coates, who would later become a supporting player in 1938.; Tommy "Butch" Bond does not appear.; With Rosina Lawrence.
153	154	Rushin' Ballet	Gordon Douglas	April 24	Darwood Kaye appears, but not as Waldo.; Television prints edited due to racial humor involving African Americans.
154	153	Three Smart Boys	Gordon Douglas	May 13	Tommy "Butch" Bond and Sidney "Woim" Kibrick do not appear.; Final appearance of Rosina Lawrence.; Television prints edited due to racial humor involving African Americans.
155	155	Roamin' Holiday	Gordon Douglas	June 12	One of Pete the Pup's few appearances during this period.; Butch, Woim, and Waldo do not appear.
156	156	Night 'n' Gales	Gordon Douglas	July 24	First entry for 1937 – 38 film season.; First appearance of Gary Jasgur; Butch, Woim, and Waldo do not appear.; With Johnny Arthur.
157	157	Fishy Tales	Gordon Douglas	August 28	Darwood Kaye appears, but not as Waldo.
158	158	Framing Youth	Gordon Douglas	September 11	Waldo and Woim do not appear.
159	159	The Pigskin Palooka	Gordon Douglas	October 23	With Dickie Jones.; Tommy "Butch" Bond does not appear.; Darwood Kaye appears, but not as Waldo.; One of Pete the Pup's few appearances during this period.
160	160	Mail and Female	Fred Newmeyer	November 13	First appearance of Henry Lee as "Spike".; Darwood Kaye appears, but not as Waldo.; Butch and Woim do not appear.; Final Fred Newmeyer directed film.
161	161	Our Gang Follies of 1938	Gordon Douglas	December 18	Two-reel musical special.; With Henry Brandon and Dickie Jones.; Darwood Kaye appears, but not as Waldo.; Butch, Woim, and Gary "Junior" Jasgur do not appear.; Edited slightly due to racial humor involving African Americans.; Final appearance of Patsy May
=== 1938 ===
Release#	Production#	Film	Director	Original release date	Notes/Content edits for television
162	162	Canned Fishing	Gordon Douglas	February 12	Darla, Waldo, Butch, Woim, and Spike do not appear.
163	163	Bear Facts	Gordon Douglas	March 5	Butch, Woim, Waldo, Junior, and Spike do not appear.
164	164	Three Men in a Tub	Nate Watt	March 26	Butch, Woim, and Spike do not appear.; Final appearances of Jerry Tucker and John Collum.
165	165	Came the Brawn	Gordon Douglas	April 16	George "Spanky" McFarland departs series after this short; will rejoin after transition to MGM.; Junior does not appear.
166	166	Feed 'em and Weep	Gordon Douglas	May 7	First appearance of Leonard Landy.; Buckwheat, Spike, Butch, Woim, and Waldo do not appear. In Buckwheat's place is Philip Hurlic.; With Johnny Arthur.
167	167	The Awful Tooth	Nate Watt	May 28	Darla, Butch, Woim, Waldo, Leonard, and Junior do not appear.; One of Pete the Pup's few appearances during this period.
168	168	Hide and Shriek	Gordon Douglas	June 18	Final Roach short. Final two entries for 1937 – 38 film season completed by MGM.; Butch, Woim, Waldo, and Spike do not appear.

== The MGM talkies (1938–1944) ==
These one-reel sound Our Gang shorts were produced and distributed by Metro-Goldwyn-Mayer.

=== 1938 ===
Release#	Production#	Film	Director	Original release date	Notes
169	169	The Little Ranger	Gordon Douglas	August 6	First film produced by MGM; First entry for 1938 – 39 film season.; Leonard and Junior do not appear.; Shirley Coates now plays "Muggsy"
170	170	Party Fever	George Sidney	August 27	Final appearance of Pete the Pup.; Leonard, Junior, and Muggsy do not appear.
171	171	Aladdin's Lantern	Gordon Douglas	September 17	George "Spanky" McFarland returns to Our Gang with this short.; Butch, Woim, and Muggsy do not appear.; Final appearance of Henry Lee as "Spike".
172	172	Men in Fright	George Sidney	October 15	With Sonny Bupp.; Butch, Woim, Waldo, and Muggsy do not appear.
173	173	Football Romeo	George Sidney	November 12	Waldo and Muggsy do not appear.
174	174	Practical Jokers	George Sidney	December 17	Waldo and Muggsy do not appear.
=== 1939 ===
Release#	Production#	Film	Director	Original release date	Notes
175	175	Alfalfa's Aunt	George Sidney	January 7	Darla, Butch, Woim, Waldo, and Muggsy do not appear.
176	176	Tiny Troubles	George Sidney	February 18	Butch, Woim, Waldo, Muggsy, Junior, and Leonard do not appear.
177	177	Duel Personalities	George Sidney	March 11	Leonard and Junior do not appear.
178	178	Clown Princes	George Sidney	April 15	Butch, Woim, and Waldo do not appear.
179	179	Cousin Wilbur	George Sidney	April 29	Guest appearance by Scotty Beckett as Cousin Wilbur.; Muggsy does not appear.; Darwood Kaye appears, but not as Waldo.; Final appearance of Gary Jasgur.
180	180	Joy Scouts	Edward Cahn	June 24	First appearance of Mickey Gubitosi (Robert Blake).; Darla, Muggsy, Butch, Woim, and Waldo do not appear.
181	181	Dog Daze	George Sidney	July 1	Guest appearance by Scotty Beckett as Cousin Wilbur.; Leonard, Muggsy, and Mickey do not appear.
182	182	Auto Antics	Edward Cahn	July 22	Final appearance of Eugene "Porky" Lee.; Waldo and Muggsy do not appear.
183	183	Captain Spanky's Show Boat	Edward Cahn	September 9	First entry for 1939 – 40 film season.
184	184	Dad for a Day	Edward Cahn	October 21	Darla, Butch, Woim, and Muggsy do not appear.; Darwood Kaye appears, but not as Waldo.
185	185	Time Out for Lessons	Edward Cahn; Bud Murray	December 2	Final appearance of Sidney Kibrick.; Butch does not appear.
=== 1940 ===
Release#	Production#	Film	Director	Original release date	Notes
186	186	Alfalfa's Double	Edward Cahn	January 20	Butch, Waldo, and Muggsy do not appear.
187	188	The Big Premiere	Edward Cahn	March 9	Last appearance of Shirley "Muggsy" Coates.; Butch and Leonard do not appear.; Filmed in between Bubbling Troubles and All About Hash.
188	189	All About Hash	Edward Cahn	March 30	First appearance of Janet Burston, who is a supporting player at this point.; Butch and Waldo do not appear.
189	190	The New Pupil	Edward Cahn	April 27	With Juanita Quigley.; First appearance of Billy "Froggy" Laughlin, at this point a supporting player.; Darwood Kaye appears, but not as Waldo.; Butch and Leonard do not appear.; Final appearance of Harold Switzer.; Filmed in between All About Hash and Goin' Fishin.
190	187	Bubbling Troubles	Edward Cahn	May 25	Filmed between Alfalfa's Double and The Big Premiere.; Waldo does not appear.; Final appearance of Tommy "Butch" Bond.
191	192	Good Bad Boys	Edward Cahn	September 7	First entry for the 1940 – 41 film season.; Filmed in between "Goin' Fishin" and "Waldo's Last Stand".
192	193	Waldo's Last Stand	Edward Cahn	October 5	Final appearance of Darwood "Waldo" Kaye.; With Billy "Froggy" Laughlin and Janet Burston.
193	191	Goin' Fishin'	Edward Cahn	October 26	With Paul Hurst.; Filmed in between The New Pupil and Good Bad Boys
194	194	Kiddie Kure	Edward Cahn	November 23	With Thurston Hall.; Final appearance of Carl "Alfalfa" Switzer.; Billy "Froggy" Laughlin now promoted as a main player.; Leonard does not appear.
=== 1941 ===
Release#	Production#	Film	Director	Original release date	Notes
195	195	Fightin' Fools	Edward Cahn	January 25	Darla does not appear.; Final appearance of Leonard Landy.
196	196	Baby Blues	Edward Cahn	February 15	Darla does not appear.; With Janet Burston.
197	197	Ye Olde Minstrels	Edward Cahn; Bud Murray	March 18	With Walter Wills.
198	199	1-2-3-Go!	Edward Cahn	April 26	Darla does not appear.
199	200	Robot Wrecks	Edward Cahn	July 12	
200	201	Helping Hands	Edward Cahn	September 27	First entry for the 1941 – 42 film season.
201	198	Come Back, Miss Pipps	Edward Cahn	October 25	Filmed earlier in year, between Ye Olde Minstrels and 1-2-3 Go.; With Sara Haden and Christian Rub.
202	202	Wedding Worries	Edward Cahn	December 13	Final appearance of Darla Hood.
=== 1942 ===
Release#	Production#	Film	Director	Original release date	Notes
203	203	Melodies Old and New	Edward Cahn	January 24	With Walter Wills.; Janet Burston now promoted as a main player.
204	204	Going to Press	Edward Cahn	March 7	With Juanita Quigley and Darryl Hickman.; Janet does not appear.
205	205	Don't Lie	Edward Cahn	April 4	Janet does not appear.
206	206	Surprised Parties	Edward Cahn	May 30	
207	207	Doin' Their Bit	Herbert Glazer	July 18	With Walter Wills.
208	208	Rover's Big Chance	Herbert Glazer	August 22	First entry for the 1942 – 43 film season.
209	209	Mighty Lak a Goat	Herbert Glazer	October 10	Janet does not appear.
210	210	Unexpected Riches	Herbert Glazer	November 28	Janet does not appear.; Final appearance of George "Spanky" McFarland.
=== 1943 ===
Release#	Production#	Film	Director	Original release date	Notes
211	211	Benjamin Franklin, Jr.	Herbert Glazer	January 30	Mickey "Happy" Laughlin added as a replacement for Spanky.
212	212	Family Troubles	Herbert Glazer	April 3	
213	214	Calling All Kids	Sam Baerwitz	April 24	Happy does not appear.
214	215	Farm Hands	Herbert Glazer	June 19	Janet does not appear.
215	213	Election Daze	Herbert Glazer	July 31	Mickey Laughlin's last appearance. Dickie Hall plays the role of "Happy".; Filmed in between Family Troubles and Calling All Kids.
216	216	Little Miss Pinkerton	Herbert Glazer	September 18	
217	217	Three Smart Guys	Edward Cahn	October 23	
=== 1944 ===
Release#	Production#	Film	Director	Original release date	Notes
218	218	Radio Bugs	Cyril Endfield	April 1	
219	220	Tale of a Dog	Cyril Endfield	April 15	Released as part of the MGM Miniatures series rather than an Our Gang comedy.; Only entry for 1943 – 44 film season.
220	219	Dancing Romeo	Cyril Endfield	April 29	Final film in series. Planned follow-up Home Front Commandos canceled during production.

=== Foreign-language versions ===
During the early days of sound American motion picture companies often made foreign-language versions of their films. The following is a list of known foreign-language versions of Our Gang films.

Foreign language versions of short films
Year	English	French	German	Spanish
1930	The First Seven Years	Title unknown	Title unknown	Los Pequeños Papas (The Little Fathers)
1930	When the Wind Blows			Las Fantasmas (The Ghosts)
1930	Bear Shooters	Title unknown	Title unknown	Los Cazadores De Osos (The Bear Hunters)
1930	A Tough Winter	Temps d'Hiver (Winter Time)	Winter Wetter (Winter Weather)	

== Cameos/appearances in other films ==
Our Gang as a unit appeared in a handful of other Hal Roach films, and in a few outside productions as well.

- Dr. Jack (November 26, 1922) - a Hal Roach feature-length comedy starring Harold Lloyd. Jackie Condon and Mickey Daniels both appear.
- Safety Last! (April 1, 1923) - a Hal Roach feature-length comedy starring Harold Lloyd. Mickey Daniels appears.
- The Fraidy Cat (March 30, 1924) - a Hal Roach short comedy starring Charley Chase. Our Gang players featured are Joe Cobb, Mickey Daniels, Ernie "Sunshine Sammy" Morrison, and Andy Samuel.
- Girl Shy (April 20, 1924) - a feature-length comedy starring Harold Lloyd. Joe Cobb and Jackie Condon both appear.
- Rupert of Hee Haw (June 8, 1924) - a Hal Roach short comedy starring Stan Laurel. Our Gang players featured are Joe Cobb, Jackie Condon, Mickey Daniels, Mary Kornman, and Ernie "Sunshine Sammy" Morrison.
- Short Kilts (August 3, 1924) - a Hal Roach short comedy starring Stan Laurel. Our Gang players featured are Mickey Daniels and Mary Kornman.
- Battling Orioles (October 6, 1924) - a Hal Roach feature film starring Glenn Tryon. Our Gang players featured are Joe Cobb, Jackie Condon, Mickey Daniels, and Ernie "Sunshine Sammy" Morrison.
- Pathé Review (November 8, 1925) - Joe Cobb, Jackie Condon, Mickey Daniels, Johnny Downs, "Farina" Hoskins, Mary Kornman, and director Robert F. McGowan appear in a segment.
- 45 Minutes from Hollywood (December 26, 1926) - a Hal Roach short comedy starring Glenn Tryon. Features stock footage from Our Gang's Thundering Fleas.
- The Stolen Jools (April 4, 1931) (a.k.a. The Slippery Pearls) - promotional short subject intended to raise funds for the National Variety Artists tuberculosis sanitarium. Our Gang players featured are "Stymie" Beard, "Chubby" Chaney, Dorothy DeBorba, "Farina" Hoskins, "Wheezer" Hutchins, Mary Ann Jackson, Shirley Jean Rickert, and Pete the Pup.
- One Track Minds (May 20, 1933) - a Hal Roach short comedy starring Zasu Pitts and Thelma Todd. "Spanky" McFarland is featured.
- The Cracked Iceman (January 27, 1934) - a Hal Roach Charley Chase short subject, featuring Chase as a schoolteacher and the Our Gang kids as his students. Our Gang players featured are "Stymie" Beard, Tommy Bond, and "Spanky" McFarland.
- Four Parts (March 17, 1934) - a Hal Roach Charley Chase short subject. "Stymie" Beard is featured.
- I'll Take Vanilla (May 5, 1934) - a Hal Roach Charley Chase short subject. Tommy Bond is featured.
- Benny From Panama (May 26, 1934) - a Hal Roach short comedy starring Eddie Foy, Jr. "Spanky" McFarland costars.
- Kid Millions (November 10, 1934) - an Eddie Cantor musical feature. The Our Gang kids appear in bit parts among the children in Cantor's makeshift band and also appear in the Technicolor fantasy sequence finale. Our Gang players featured include Wally Albright, "Stymie" Beard, Tommy Bond, "Uh-huh" Collum, Leonard Kibrick, and Jacqueline Taylor.
- Kentucky Kernels (November 2, 1934) - a feature-length comedy starring Bert Wheeler and Robert Woolsey, and costarring "Spanky" McFarland.
- Babes in Toyland (December 16, 1934) - a Hal Roach feature-length comedy starring Stan Laurel and Oliver Hardy. Several Our Gang members appear as schoolkids, including Scotty Beckett, Marianne Edwards, Jacqueline Taylor, and Jerry Tucker. Jean Darling and Johnny Downs also appear, respectively playing Curly Locks and Little Boy Blue.
- Southern Exposure (April 6, 1935) - a Hal Roach Charley Chase short subject. "Alfalfa" Switzer makes a cameo appearance.
- Here Comes the Band (August 30, 1935) - a musical comedy feature starring Ted Lewis, and costarring "Spanky" McFarland.
- Annie Oakley (November 15, 1935) - a George Stevens film. Jerry Tucker costars.
- Life Hesitates at 40 (November 18, 1935) - a Hal Roach Charley Chase short subject. "Alfalfa" Switzer makes a cameo appearance.
- The Bohemian Girl (February 14, 1936) - a Hal Roach feature-length comedy starring Stan Laurel and Oliver Hardy. Darla Hood costars.
- Neighborhood House (May 9, 1936) - a Hal Roach Charley Chase short subject. Darla Hood costars.
- Kelly the Second (August 21, 1936) - a Hal Roach feature-length comedy starring Patsy Kelly and Charley Chase. "Alfalfa" Switzer makes a cameo appearance.
- Block-Heads (August 19, 1938) - a Hal Roach feature-length comedy starring Stan Laurel and Oliver Hardy. Tommy "Butch" Bond makes a cameo appearance.
- The Singing Lesson (1941) - a soundie starring "Alfalfa" Switzer.
- Johnny Doughboy (December 31, 1942) - a feature film starring Jane Withers. George "Spanky" McFarland and Carl "Alfalfa" Switzer are also featured.
- It's a Wonderful Life (December 20, 1946) - a Frank Capra feature film starring Jimmy Stewart. Carl "Alfalfa" Switzer makes a cameo appearance.
- State of the Union (April 30, 1948) - a Frank Capra feature film starring Spencer Tracy. Carl "Alfalfa" Switzer makes a cameo appearance.

== Our Gang related films ==
- The Boy Friends (September 13, 1930 through June 18, 1932), a Hal Roach produced short comedy series considered by some to be a spin-off of Our Gang. Former Our Gang stars Mickey Daniels and Mary Kornman were among the series' stars. One Boy Friends short, Too Many Women, featured a direct reference to Our Gang - flashback footage of Mickey and Mary as children.
- General Spanky (December 11, 1936), a feature film produced by Hal Roach and directed by Fred Newmeyer and Gordon Douglas; a Metro-Goldwyn-Mayer release. Starring George "Spanky" McFarland, Phillips Holmes, Billie "Buckwheat" Thomas, Rosina Lawrence, and Carl "Alfalfa" Switzer, General Spanky was intended as a test film to move Our Gang into features, but did not perform to Hal Roach's and MGM's expectations at the box office.
- The Gas House Kids (October 9, 1946 through August 23, 1947), a series of B Movies loosely based on the then-popular East Side Kids/The Bowery Boys comedies. Produced by Producers Releasing Corporation. Three films, Gas House Kids, Gas House Kids Go West, and Gas House Kids in Hollywood were made. Carl Switzer reprised his "Alfalfa" character in two of these films. Tommy Bond was also featured in the cast.
- Curley (August 23, 1947) and Who Killed Doc Robbin (April 9, 1948), two Streamliners produced by Hal Roach and Robert F. McGowan and directed by Bernard Carr with a similar cast and tone as the Our Gang comedies. Both films starred Larry Olsen, Billy Gray, and Matthew "Stymie" Beard's brother Renee Beard. Roach forfeited his option to buy back the rights to the Our Gang trademark to produce these films.
- The Little Rascals Varieties (May 5, 1959), a feature-length compilation featuring clips from Our Gang Follies of 1936, The Pinch Singer, Reunion in Rhythm, and Our Gang Follies of 1938.
- The Little Rascals (August 5, 1994), a feature-length adaptation of Our Gang which includes gags and situations borrowed directly from several of the original shorts. Directed by Penelope Spheeris and starring Travis Tedford as Spanky, Bug Hall as Alfalfa, Brittany Ashton Holmes as Darla, and Ross Bagley as Buckwheat, The Little Rascals was produced by Steven Spielberg's Amblin Entertainment and released by Universal Pictures.
- The Little Rascals Save the Day (April 1, 2014), a direct-to-video Our Gang feature-length adaptation in much the same format as the 1994 film. Directed by Alex Zamm and starring Jet Jurgensmeyer as Spanky, Drew Justice as Alfalfa, Eden Wood as Darla, and Isaiah "Zay Zay" Fredericks as Buckwheat, The Little Rascals was produced by Capital Arts Entertainment and released by Universal Studios Home Entertainment.

== Our Gang related television productions ==
- The Little Rascals Christmas Special (December 3, 1979), a thirty-minute animated television special featuring Philip Tanzini as Spanky, Jimmy Gatherum as Alfalfa, Randi Kiger as Darla, Robby Kiger as Porky, and Al Jocko Fann as Stymie. Darla Hood and Matthew "Stymie" Beard are also featured.
- Rascal Dazzle (1980), a compilation film featuring clips from various Roach produced films. Narrated by Jerry Lewis.
- The Little Rascals (September 25, 1982 through September 1, 1984), a Saturday morning cartoon produced by Hanna-Barbera Productions, featuring the voices of Scott Menville as Spanky, Julie McWhirter Dees as Alfalfa and Porky, Shavar Ross as Buckwheat, Patty Maloney as Darla, and Peter Cullen as Pete the Pup.

== Home media ==
=== Blackhawk/Republic releases ===
For many years, Blackhawk Films released 79 of the 80 Roach talkies on 16 mm film. The sound discs for Railroading' had been lost since the 1940s, and a silent print was made available for home movie release until 1982, when the film's sound discs were located in the MGM vault and the short was restored with sound. Like the television prints, Blackhawk's Little Rascals reissues featured custom-created title cards in place of the original Our Gang logos, as per MGM's 1949 arrangement with Hal Roach not to distribute the series under its original title.

In 1983, with the VHS home video market growing, Blackhawk began distributing Little Rascals VHS tapes available through catalogue only. The 80 sound shorts were made available across twenty-seven VHS volumes (one volume had the MGM short Waldo's Last Stand which was public domain to round out to 81), three shorts to a tape. Half a dozen silent episodes were also available across three additional VHS volumes. Four volumes on VHS went out of print by 1986, then leaving only 69 out of 80 episodes available.

National Telefilm Associates, later renamed Republic Pictures, purchased Blackhawk in 1983, and continued the catalogue releases while also making The Little Rascals available on retail home video collections in 1984. 30 Little Rascals shorts were released in a set of five VHS compilations, with six shorts to a volume: Little Rascals Comedy Classics 1, Little Rascals Comedy Classics 2, Best of the Little Rascals, Little Rascals on Parade, and Adventures of Little Rascals. Each of these tapes contained two volumes of the 1983 catalogue releases, making each tape contain six episodes. In addition, Republic made the first two catalogue volumes available for retail.

Twelve Little Rascals shorts made their way to home video through Spotlite Video in 1986. These also were all previously released on the catalogue Blackhawk releases and contained none of the ones that had been out of print. These were available through retail. Meanwhile, MGM released 20 of its 52 Our Gang shorts in a five-volume VHS set with four shorts per tape.

In 1991, Republic repackaged 30 Little Rascals shorts for a fifteen-volume VHS set, with two shorts per tape. Out of the 30 episodes released, only one of them (Night 'n' Gales) had been previously unreleased.

=== Cabin Fever/Hallmark releases ===
In 1993, Republic sold the home video rights to the 80 sound Roach shorts and some of the available silent shorts to Cabin Fever Entertainment. Cabin Fever also acquired the rights to use the original Our Gang title cards and MGM logos; for the first time in over 50 years, the Roach sound Our Gang comedies could be seen in their original format. In June 1994, Cabin Fever released a 12-volume set of Little Rascals VHS tapes, hosted by Leonard Maltin. With four shorts per tape, Cabin Fever made 48 Roach sound shorts available for purchase, uncut and with digitally restored and remastered picture and sound.

Due to the success of these volumes, Cabin Fever released nine more volumes in June 1995, which made the other 32 Roach talkies available for purchase (some of which had never been available on home video before). Five of these volumes contained four sound shorts, while the other four featured three sound shorts and a silent short.

Cabin Fever began pressing DVD versions of their first 12 Little Rascals VHS volumes (with the contents of two VHS volumes included on each DVD), but went out of business before the release was announced in late 1998. Early in 1999, they sold their catalog to Hallmark Entertainment.

In April 2000, Hallmark cleared out their warehouse, making all of the Little Rascals DVDs and VHS tapes available for retail, but never did an official launch of the Cabin Fever Little Rascals DVDs. In August, the first 10 volumes were re-released on VHS with new packaging, and the first two volumes were released on DVD as The Little Rascals: Volumes 1-2. In 2003, the VHS tapes went out of print. That spring, Hallmark issued a DVD called Little Rascals Vols. 3–4, which actually did not completely compile volumes three and four of the Cabin Fever VHS set, but included ten Our Gang shorts. On November 13, 2005, ten more Little Rascals shorts were issued on a DVD entitled Little Rascals Collectors Edition III.

=== MGM/UA releases ===
Throughout the early and mid 1990s, MGM/UA released a handful of the 1938-1944 MGM Our Gang shorts on VHS. The 1936 feature film General Spanky received both a VHS and LaserDisc release. Additionally, MGM/UA released a LaserDisc set of Our Gang comedies, consisting of both silent films and sound films.

=== Later releases ===
In 2006, Legend Films released colorized versions of twenty four Our Gang comedies, which were released across five Little Rascals DVDs. Twenty three of these shorts were Hal Roach talkies, while the remaining film is Waldo's Last Stand, a public domain short from the MGM era. These DVDs went out of print in 2009.

RHI Entertainment and Genius Products released an eight-disc DVD box set entitled The Little Rascals - the Complete Collection on October 28, 2008. This set includes all of the Hal Roach sound short films in the Our Gang series (1929–1938), encompassing all of the Our Gang shorts distributed to TV as The Little Rascals (save for a handful of silents). Sixty-four of the shorts are sourced from the Cabin Fever restorations, while the remaining sixteen shorts utilize older Blackhawk Films transfers without their original title cards. On June 14, 2011, Vivendi Entertainment re-released seven of the eight DVDs from the RHI/Genius box set (which encompasses all of the sound Roach Our Gang shorts and excludes the eight "special features" bonus disc), replacing the Blackhawk transfers with their respective Cabin Fever restorations.

Throughout the 2000s, Warner Home Video used individual MGM Our Gang shorts as supplemental features on DVD releases of entries in their classic film library. On September 1, 2009, Warner Bros. released the fifty two MGM Our Gang shorts in a compilation as part of their Warner Archive Collection mail-order series. The collection, Our Gang Comedies 1938–1942 (despite the title, includes the 1943 and 1944 MGM shorts as well), is available for DVD mail order through the Warner Bros. Studio Online Store, and for digital download through both the WB Studio Online Store and the Apple iTunes Store. On January 19, 2016, General Spanky was released on DVD through Warners.

=== Public domain ===
The following Our Gang comedies are in the public domain, and have appeared on many different VHS and DVD releases over the years.

- All pre-1931 comedies
- 1937: Our Gang Follies of 1938
- 1940: Waldo's Last Stand
