= Calling All Kids =

- Directed by: Sam Baerwitz
- Written by: Hal Law; Robert A. McGowan
- Produced by: Metro-Goldwyn-Mayer
- Starring: Bobby Blake; Janet Burston; Billy Laughlin; Billie Thomas; Jackie Horner; Marlene Kinghorn; Marlene Mains; David Polonsky
- Narrated by: Mark Daniels
- Cinematography: Jackson Rose
- Edited by: Leon Borgeau
- Music by: Max Terr
- Distributed by: Metro-Goldwyn-Mayer
- Release date: 24 April 1943
- Running time: 10:52
- Country: United States
- Language: English

Calling All Kids is a 1943 Our Gang short comedy film directed by Sam Baerwitz. It was the 214th Our Gang short to be released.

== Plot ==
Calling All Kids finds the gang invading a local radio station to perform a revue honoring the U.S. military. Amidst such highlights as a "recruiting office" sketch featuring the duo of Mickey and Froggy, and a closing ensemble piece with lyrics that rhyme "Taxes" with "Axis," the film features an extended celebrity-impression routine, with Buckwheat imitating Eddie "Rochester" Anderson and other kids posing as Judy Garland, Eleanor Powell, Fred Astaire, Carmen Miranda, and Virginia O'Brien.

== Cast ==
- Bobby Blake as Mickey
- Janet Burston as Janet/Carmen Miranda
- Billy Laughlin as Froggy
- Billie Thomas as Buckwheat/Rochester

=== Additional cast ===
- Jackie Horner as Eleanor Powell
- Marlene Kinghorn as Girl singer/Judy Garland
- Marlene Mains as Virginia O'Brien
- David Polonsky as Fred Astaire
- Eleanor Taylor as Marine
- Frank Ward as Marine
- Giovanna Gubitosi as Audience member
- James Gubitosi as Audience member
- Tommy McFarland as Audience member
- Eddie Anderson – Voice-over for Buckwheat
- Mark Daniels – NBC Radio announcer

== See also ==
- Our Gang filmography
