= Melodies Old and New =

- Directed by: Edward Cahn
- Written by: Hal Law; Robert A. McGowan
- Produced by: Metro-Goldwyn-Mayer
- Starring: George McFarland; Billie Thomas; Mickey Gubitosi; Billy Laughlin; Janet Burston; Walter Wills
- Cinematography: Jackson Rose
- Edited by: Leon Borgeau
- Music by: David Snell
- Distributed by: Metro-Goldwyn-Mayer
- Release date: January 24, 1942
- Running time: 10:53
- Country: United States
- Language: English

Melodies Old and New is a 1942 Our Gang short comedy film directed by Edward Cahn. It was the 203rd Our Gang short to be released.

== Plot ==
The gang prevails upon old-time minstrel impresario Uncle Wills to help them stage a fund-raising musical show (as they did in Ye Olde Minstrels). Highlights include the ensemble number "When Grandma Wore a Bustle", the barbershop-quartet set piece "Songs of Long Ago", and the grand finale "Dances Old and New". The kids are unable to post the profits because Mickey has allowed most of the audience to enter for free, but Uncle Wills comes to the rescue once again.

== Cast ==
=== The Gang ===
- Janet Burston as Janet
- Mickey Gubitosi as Mickey
- Billy Laughlin as Froggy
- George McFarland as Spanky
- Billie Thomas as Buckwheat

=== Additional cast ===
- Walter Wills as Uncle Walt Wills

=== Dancers and audience members ===
Lavonne Battle, Shiela Brown, Shirley Jean Doble, Donna Jean Edmondson, Eddie Ehrhardt, James Gubitosi, Dwayne Hickman, Dickie Humphries, Robert Morris, Kay Tapscott, Frank Lester Ward, Patricia Wheeler

== See also ==
- Our Gang filmography
