= 1-2-3 Go =

- Directed by: Edward Cahn
- Written by: Hal Law; Robert A. McGowan
- Produced by: Metro-Goldwyn-Mayer
- Starring: George McFarland; Billie Thomas; Mickey Gubitosi; Billy Laughlin
- Cinematography: Jackson Rose
- Edited by: Leon Borgeau
- Distributed by: Metro-Goldwyn-Mayer
- Release date: April 26, 1941
- Running time: 10:21
- Country: United States
- Language: English

1-2-3 Go is a 1941 Our Gang short comedy film. It was the 199th Our Gang short to be released.

It was directed by Edward Cahn, and starred George McFarland, Billie Thomas, Mickey Gubitosi, and Billy Laughlin.

== Plot ==
While playing baseball on a busy street in Greenpoint, Mickey is struck by a car. Though he fully recovers from his injuries, Mickey meets several other kids in the hospital who were not so lucky.

Quickly developing a sense of civic responsibility, the Gang members establish the 1-2-3 Go Safety Society, dedicated to lowering the number of auto injuries in their community.

== Cast ==
- Mickey Gubitosi as Mickey
- Billy Laughlin as Froggy
- George McFarland as Spanky
- Billie Thomas as Buckwheat

=== Additional cast ===
- Vincent Graeff as Kid umpire
- Giovanna Gubitosi as Kid eating ice cream
- James Gubitosi as Kid giving up home run
- Freddie Walburn as Kid retrieving home run from street
- Barbara Bedford as Ann, a nurse
- Margaret Bert as Nurse at reception desk
- John Dilson as Mayor Of Greenpoint
- Arthur Hoyt as Horace
- May McAvoy as Miss Jones, a nurse
- Anne O'Neil as Horace's wife
- William Tannen as Cab driver
- Joe Young as Man calling for ambulance

== See also ==
- Our Gang filmography
