= Helping Hands (film) =

1941 film by Edward L. Cahn

- Directed by: Edward Cahn
- Written by: Hal Law; Robert A. McGowan
- Produced by: Metro-Goldwyn-Mayer
- Starring: George McFarland; Billie Thomas; Darla Hood; Mickey Gubitosi; Billy Laughlin
- Cinematography: Jackson Rose
- Edited by: Leon Borgeau
- Distributed by: Metro-Goldwyn-Mayer
- Release date: September 27, 1941
- Running time: 10:44
- Country: United States
- Language: English

Helping Hands is a 1941 Our Gang short comedy film directed by Edward Cahn. It was the 201st Our Gang short to be released.

== Plot ==
Spanky receives a letter from his recently drafted older brother. Inspired by the letter's patriotic sentiments, Spanky and the gang organize a "home guard," prepared to do battle should the Nazis invade California. This attracts the attention of Army Major Sanford, who informs the kids that they would be of even greater service to Uncle Sam by looking out for fire hazards, collecting scrap metal and paper, and encouraging their parents to buy war stamps and bonds.

== Cast ==
=== The Gang ===
- Mickey Gubitosi as Mickey
- Darla Hood as Darla
- Billy Laughlin as Froggy
- George McFarland as Spanky
- Billie Thomas as Buckwheat

=== Additional cast ===
- Vincent Graeff as Sentree
- James Gubitosi as Nick
- Edward Soo Hoo as Lee Wong
- Harvard Peck as Boy examined by Froggy
- Leon Tyler as Swedish boy
- Freddie Chapman as Kid complaining in line
- Mickey Laughlin as Kid hit with baseball bat
- Margaret Bert as Mickey's mother
- Sam Flint as Major Sanford
- Byron Foulger as Mr. Morton, head of civilian counsel
- Joe Young as Clerk
- Raphael Dolciame as Kid
- Ralph Hodges as Kid
- Mickey McGuire as Kid
- Michael Miller as Kid
- Tommy Dee Miller as Kid
- Emmet Vogan as Darla's father (scene deleted)

== Production notes ==
The film marked the first of the wartime propaganda-themed shorts in the Our Gang series. Critics and fans both have cited that the wartime films marked a noticeable decline in the series.

== See also ==
- Our Gang filmography
