= Mighty Lak a Goat =

- Directed by: Herbert Glazer
- Written by: Hal Law; Robert A. McGowan
- Produced by: Metro-Goldwyn-Mayer
- Starring: George McFarland; Billie Thomas; Bobby Blake; Billy Laughlin; John Dilson; George B. French; Ava Gardner; Robert Emmett O'Connor; Joe Yule Sr.
- Cinematography: Jackson Rose
- Edited by: Leon Borgeau
- Distributed by: Metro-Goldwyn-Mayer
- Release date: October 10, 1942
- Running time: 9:39
- Country: United States
- Language: English

Mighty Lak a Goat is a 1942 Our Gang short comedy film directed by Herbert Glazer. It was the 209th Our Gang short to be released. The title is a reference to the 1901 song, "Mighty Lak' a Rose".

== Plot ==
The gang tries to clean off their clothes after being splattered with mud accidentally by a passing motorist. A unique cleaning solution devised by Froggy works beautifully, but with one major drawback: The stuff has a terribly pungent odor. Froggy tells the gang that they would get used to the smell. They do get used to the bad odor to the point of being oblivious to it. The kids manage to empty out a bus trying to board it.

They walk to school and get thrown out of the classroom due to their smell. Then, being free from school, the gang goes to see a movie called Don't Open That Door at the theater. The movie-house cashier notices their smell, but they head into the auditorium. Then even the actors on the screen cannot stand the smell and stop performing. They finally get removed from the theater and remove their clothes behind a tree.

== Cast ==
=== The Gang ===
- Bobby Blake as Mickey
- Billy Laughlin as Froggy
- George McFarland as Spanky
- Billie Thomas as Buckwheat

=== Additional cast ===
- John Dilson as Banker Stone
- George B. French as Patron
- Ava Gardner as Girl at the theatre box office
- Robert Emmett O'Connor as Detective King
- Anne O'Neal as Schoolteacher
- William Tannen as Bus driver
- Joe Yule Sr. as Patron
- Lee Phelps as Police officer
- Charlie Sullivan as Bus passenger

== Production notes ==
- Ava Gardner plays the role of the cashier at the film theater. According to Robert Blake, Mickey Rooney, who was married to Gardner at the time, came in to direct her one scene. Rooney's father, Joe Yule, Sr. has a cameo as a movie patron.
- The film they see is called Don't Open That Door. The scene in the movie shown on this film starred Robert Emmet O'Connor, Banker Stone and John Dilson.

== See also ==
- Our Gang filmography
