= Fightin' Fools =

1941 American short film by Edward L. Cahn

- Directed by: Edward Cahn
- Written by: Hal Law; Robert A. McGowan
- Cinematography: Clyde De Vinna
- Edited by: Leon Borgeau
- Distributed by: Metro-Goldwyn-Mayer
- Release date: January 25, 1941
- Running time: 8:53
- Country: United States
- Language: English

Fightin' Fools is a 1941 Our Gang short comedy film directed by Edward Cahn. It was the 195th Our Gang short to be released.

== Plot ==
The gang is swimming in their favorite swimming hole, except for Tubby, who is scared to jump in. He finally does and his great weight and size causes all the water to splash out of the swimming hole, leaving the gang dry.

Meanwhile, bully Slicker and his friends tie knots in the Gang's clothes and when the gang finds them, a total war is declared. Commandeered by Spanky, Buckwheat, and Tubby, the gang staves off Slicker's "troops" with a barrage of fruit, vegetables, rotten eggs and Limburger cheese. For a while, it looks as though Slicker has gained the upper hand, but the gang successfully mounts an aerial counteroffensive.

== Notes ==
Though this film is not generally rated highly, it does have a few aspects that set it apart from other Our Gang films of the era. The cast is entirely made up of children, one of very few such instances at M-G-M. It is also one of the few Our Gang shorts since the mid-1930s to be filmed almost entirely outdoors. Finally there is a strong emphasis on sight gags, though they occur at a relatively low density compared to earlier films. Nonetheless these things taken together make this perhaps the closest the M-G-M era ever came to the feel of the McGowan era Our Gang. There is evidence within the film that this may be a conscious effort. The war takes place on "McGowan's Lot." Might be a remake or a nod to the previous Our Gang Little Rascals 1923 silent short Dogs of War.

== Cast ==
=== The Gang ===
- Mickey Gubitosi as Mickey
- Billy Laughlin as Froggy
- George McFarland as Spanky
- Billie Thomas as Buckwheat
- Leonard Landy as Leonard
- Joe Strauch, Jr. as Tubby

=== Additional cast ===
- Freddie Walburn as Slicker
- Hugh "Dewey" Binyon as Member of Slicker's gang
- Vincent Graeff as Member of Slicker's gang
- Tommy Tobin as Member of Slicker's gang

== See also ==
- Our Gang filmography
