= Surprised Parties =

- Directed by: Edward Cahn
- Written by: Hal Law; Robert A. McGowan
- Produced by: Metro-Goldwyn-Mayer
- Starring: George McFarland; Billie Thomas; Mickey Gubitosi; Billy Laughlin; Janet Burston
- Cinematography: Walter Lundin
- Edited by: Leon Borgeau
- Distributed by: Metro-Goldwyn-Mayer
- Release date: May 30, 1942
- Running time: 10:51
- Country: United States
- Language: English

Surprised Parties is a 1942 Our Gang short comedy film directed by Edward Cahn and starring George McFarland, Billie Thomas, Mickey Gubitosi, Billy Laughlin, and Janet Burston. It was the 206th Our Gang short to be released.

== Plot ==
Upset because, as a leap year baby (he only has a birthday every four years), Froggy remembers the fact that he has almost never had a birthday party. The gang decides to throw a surprise party in Froggy's honor, but they pretend to throw him out of the clubhouse in order to keep it a secret. Vengefully, Froggy sneaks back and sets all sorts of booby-traps for the other gang members and then shows up at the party disguised as a new girl in town. But when Froggy discovers that the party was for him, he becomes guilty and sets off all the traps by himself.

== Cast ==
=== The Gang ===
- Janet Burston as Janet
- Mickey Gubitosi as Mickey
- Billy Laughlin as Froggy Laughlin
- George McFarland as Spanky
- Billie Thomas as Buckwheat

=== Additional cast ===
- Margaret Bert as Froggy's mother
- Giovanna Gubitosi as Gloria
- Leon Tyler as Jimmy

=== Party guests ===
Buz Buckley, James Gubitosi, Tommy Tucker, Frank Ward

== Production note ==
Surprised Parties was the last short with Edward Cahn as Our Gang's regular director. He would return in 1943 to direct Three Smart Guys. Herbert Glazer takes over directing beginning with Doin' Their Bit.

== See also ==
- Our Gang filmography
