= Unexpected Riches =

- Directed by: Herbert Glazer
- Written by: Hal Law; Robert A. McGowan
- Starring: George McFarland; Billie Thomas; Billy Laughlin; Bobby Blake
- Cinematography: Charles Schoenbaum
- Edited by: Leon Borgeau
- Distributed by: Metro-Goldwyn-Mayer
- Release date: November 28, 1942
- Running time: 10:51
- Country: United States
- Language: English

Unexpected Riches is a 1942 Our Gang short comedy film directed by Herbert Glazer. It was the 211th Our Gang short to be released.

== Plot ==
Weighing themselves on a penny machine, the gang receives a fortune card predicting that they will receive "unexpected riches." Acting upon this, the kids decide to dig for buried treasure, using a fraudulent map provided by one of their wise-guy acquaintances. Though the treasure hunt comes a-cropper, the fortune card's prediction comes true in an unexpected fashion.

== Cast ==
=== The Gang ===
- Bobby Blake as Mickey
- Billy Laughlin as Froggy
- George McFarland as Spanky
- Billie Thomas as Buckwheat

=== Additional cast ===
- Barry Downing as Ken Reed
- Emmet Vogan as Mr. Reed
- Ernie Alexander as Mickey's father
- Margaret Bert as Mickey's mother
- Willa Pearl Curtis as Big Shot's mother
- Symona Boniface as Person in Froggy's dream
- Stanley Logan as Person in Froggy's dream
- Ernestine Wade as Person in Buckwheat's dream

== Notes ==
Unexpected Riches is the last appearance of George McFarland as Spanky, ending his eleven-year tenure with the series for reasons of aging into young adulthood as McFarland was 14. Billie "Buckwheat" Thomas would remain the only holdover from the Hal Roach Our Gang era to stay with the series until its end in 1944.

== See also ==
- Our Gang filmography
