= Radio Bugs =

- Directed by: Cyril Endfield
- Written by: Hal Law; Robert A. McGowan
- Starring: Billy Laughlin; Bobby Blake; Janet Burston; Billie Thomas
- Cinematography: Walter Lundin
- Edited by: John D. Faure
- Distributed by: Metro-Goldwyn-Mayer
- Release date: April 1, 1944
- Running time: 10:50
- Country: United States
- Language: English
- Budget: $22,121

Radio Bugs is a 1944 Our Gang short comedy film directed by Cyril Endfield. It was the 218th Our Gang short to be released.

== Plot ==
Froggy and his parents enjoy a Red Skelton USO performance over the radio. Learning from his father that comedians make a lot of money, Froggy decides that he and the gang should become radio comedians. They buy a joke book from a local used bookstore, and crash the lobby of a local dentists' office looking for a sponsor. The gang's horrible jokes and worse singing cause the waiting dental patients pain and distress, leading to their being thrown off the premises.

Returning to the bookstore to look for another joke book, one of the bookstore patrons, a ham actor, convinces the kids to go into Shakespearean drama instead of comedy. Donning appropriate costumes, the gang attempts to audition their "sad and tragic" Shakespearean radio act for another potential sponsor, a funeral home, but the triplet owners of the company fall over themselves laughing at the gang's dramatic acting.

On their way home, the crestfallen kids happen upon the host of the Cantfall Cake Hourradio show, who is interviewing passersby on the street. Amused by the children's costumes, he decides to ask the kids his interview question for the day: "what do you think is the crying need of radio today?" The gang's reply: "a sponsor!"

== Cast ==
=== The Gang ===
- Janet Burston as Janet
- Bobby Blake as Mickey
- Billy Laughlin as Froggy
- Billie Thomas as Buckwheat

=== Additional cast ===
- Erville Anderson as U. Grimble
- Morris Ankrum as Pain-Killer Kilroy, the dentist
- Chester Clute as Dental patient
- Fern Emmett as Dental patient
- Tiny Hanlon as Cantfall Cake Hour Radio Host
- Brandon Hurst as Shakespearean actor
- Jack Lipson as Dental patient
- Red Skelton as himself (radio voice over)
- Walter Soderling as O. Grimble
- Pete Sosso as Mr. Jasper, bookshop owner
- Joe Yule as Dental patient
- Bobby Burns as Crowd extra
- Charles K. French as Town banker (scenes deleted)

== Production notes ==
Radio Bugs was the third-to-last Our Gang shorts produced. It marks the directorial debut Cyril Endfield. The three Endfield-directed shorts — Radio Bugs, Dancing Romeo and Tale of a Dog — were all shot in late 1943, and released within two weeks of each other in April 1944. As with several other Our Gang films of this period, Radio Bugs lost money upon its original theatrical release. According to financial data prepared by MGM in 1956, Radio Bugs cost $22,121 to produce, but lost $4,759 at the box office.

The real Red Skelton provides the voiceover for the radio show Froggy's family enjoys during the first scenes of the film. One of the bit players in this short is Mickey Rooney's father Joe Yule, who portrays one of the pained dental patients.

== See also ==
- Our Gang filmography
