= Rover's Big Chance =

- Directed by: Herbert Glazer
- Written by: Hal Law; Robert A. McGowan
- Produced by: Metro-Goldwyn-Mayer
- Starring: George McFarland; Billie Thomas; Bobby Blake; Billy Laughlin; Janet Burston; Stephen McNally
- Cinematography: Jackson Rose
- Edited by: Leon Borgeau
- Distributed by: Metro-Goldwyn-Mayer
- Release date: August 22, 1942
- Running time: 10:42
- Country: United States
- Language: English

Rover's Big Chance is a 1942 Our Gang short comedy film directed by Herbert Glazer. It was the 208th Our Gang short to be released.

== Plot ==
On the say-so of studio casting director J.D. Broderick, Patterson agrees to give a screen test to the Our Gang kids' talented dog Rover. Unfortunately, the petulant pooch does not take direction well, nor does he respond positively when the cameraman announces that he is ready to start filming.

== Cast ==
=== The Gang ===
- Bobby Blake as Mickey
- Janet Burston as Janet
- Billy Laughlin as Froggy
- George McFarland as Spanky
- Billie Thomas as Buckwheat

=== Additional cast ===
- Horace Stephen McNally as Wm. "Bill" Patterson
- Freddie Chapman as Tony
- Clyde Demback as Fatty
- Bobby Anderson as Baseball player
- Billy Finnegan as Baseball player
- Bert Le Baron as Grip
- Barbara Bedford as Studio clerk
- Ben Hall as George
- Hugh McCormick as Professor Ventriloko
- Byron Shores as J.D. Broderick

== Production notes ==
By the time of Rover's Big Chance, Mickey Gubitosi had legally changed his name to Robert "Bobby" Blake. He retained the name "Mickey" for the remainder of the series.

Rover's Big Chance was the second MGM Our Gang short to lose money upon its initial release, losing nearly $1,800 after post-production costs were calculated.

Future film star Stephen McNally appears in this Our Gang episode as Bill Patterson, ace director at Mammoth Studios.

== See also ==
- Our Gang filmography
