= Baby Blues (1941 film) =

1941 film by Edward L. Cahn

- Film poster
- Directed by: Edward Cahn
- Written by: Hal Law; Robert A. McGowan
- Cinematography: Jackson Rose
- Edited by: Leon Borgeau
- Distributed by: Metro-Goldwyn-Mayer
- Release date: February 15, 1941
- Running time: 9:18
- Country: United States
- Language: English

Baby Blues is a 1941 Our Gang short comedy film directed by Edward Cahn. It was the 196th Our Gang short to be released.

== Plot ==
When Mickey reads something in a jokebook stating that one out of every four children born is Chinese, he begins to worry that his new baby brother or sister will be Chinese as well. The Gang put Mickey at ease by telling him that it will not be so bad to have a Chinese sibling. The gang then introduce Mickey to Spanky's friend Lee Wong. Once he has learned that people are people no matter what their ethnic background, Mickey is happy—until he discovers that his much-anticipated "kid brother" is not only a girl, but twins to boot.

== Cast ==
=== The Gang ===
- Mickey Gubitosi as Mickey Gubitosi
- Billy Laughlin as Froggy
- George McFarland as Spanky
- Billie Thomas as Buckwheat

=== Additional cast ===
- Edward Soo Hoo as Lee Wong
- Janet Burston as Mamie Gubitosi
- Freddie Chapman as Bully, tough kid
- Vincent Graeff as Tough kid
- James Gubitosi as Tough kid
- Ruth Tobey as Gladys Gubitosi
- Hank Mann as Zoo assistant
- Margaret Bert as Receptionist
- William Edmunds as Mickey's father
- Eddie Lee as Lee Wong's father
- Jenny Lee as Lee Wong's mother

== See also ==
- Our Gang filmography
