= Little Miss Pinkerton =

- Directed by: Herbert Glazer
- Written by: Hal Law; Robert A. McGowan
- Produced by: Metro-Goldwyn-Mayer
- Starring: Janet Burston; Bobby Blake; Billy Laughlin; Billie Thomas; Robert Emmet O'Connor
- Cinematography: Jackson Rose
- Edited by: Leon Borgeau
- Distributed by: Metro-Goldwyn-Mayer
- Release date: September 18, 1943
- Running time: 10:40
- Country: United States
- Language: English

Little Miss Pinkerton is a 1943 Our Gang short comedy film directed by Herbert Glazer. It was the 216th Our Gang short to be released.

== Synopsis ==
The janitor of the Greenpoint department store is murdered during a robbery, while Mickey, Froggy, Buckwheat, and Janet witness the crime. The thieves take the boys hostage, but Janet escapes and heads for the police. Alas, no grownup will believe her story, so Janet enlists the aid of the other gang members to rescue the boys and capture the crooks.

== Production notes ==
This is the last of Our Gang episodes directed by Herbert Glazer, who disappeared into obscurity after that. Edward Cahn returns for the next episode, Three Smart Guys.

This was the third MGM Our Gang short to lose money during its initial release, losing approximately $900 after print and advertising expenses were factored into the budget.

== Cast ==
=== The Gang ===
- Janet Burston as Janet
- Bobby Blake as Mickey
- Billy Laughlin as Froggy
- Billie Thomas as Buckwheat

=== Additional cast ===
- Robert Ferrero as Paper boy
- Mark Daniels as Photographer
- Robert Emmet O'Connor as Sgt. O'Toole
- Dick Rich as Pete
- Norman Willis as Joe

== See also ==
- Our Gang filmography
