= Election Daze =

- Directed by: Herbert Glazer
- Written by: Hal Law; Robert A. McGowan
- Starring: Bobby Blake; Janet Burston; Billy Laughlin; Billie Thomas; Dickie Hall
- Cinematography: Robert L. Surtees
- Edited by: Leon Borgeau
- Distributed by: Metro-Goldwyn-Mayer
- Release date: July 31, 1943
- Running time: 10:06
- Country: United States
- Language: English

Election Daze is a 1943 Our Gang short comedy film directed by Herbert Glazer. It was the 213th Our Gang short to be released.

== Plot ==
As the incumbent for the presidency of the "One for All and All for One Club," Mickey is so certain he will win that he refuses to campaign. The situation changes radically when Mickey is challenged by political upstart Froggy, who gains popular support with a steady stream of empty promises. But both candidates are in for an unpleasant surprise when Janet Burston appears as a write-in.

== Cast ==
=== The Gang ===
- Bobby Blake as Mickey
- Janet Burston as Janet
- Billy Laughlin as Froggy
- Billie Thomas as Buckwheat
- Dickie Hall as Happy

=== Additional club members ===
Robert Anderson, Buzz Buckley, Freddie Chapman, Barry Downing, Robert Ferrerro, Giovanna Gubitosi, Jackie Horner, Mickey Laughlin, Valerie Lee, Tommy Tucker, Frank Lester Ward

== See also ==
- Our Gang filmography
