= Robot Wrecks =

- Directed by: Edward Cahn
- Written by: Hal Law; Robert A. McGowan
- Produced by: Metro-Goldwyn-Mayer
- Starring: George McFarland; Billie Thomas; Darla Hood; Mickey Gubitosi; Billy Laughlin; Vincent Graeff; Freddie Walburn; Margaret Bert; Billy Bletcher
- Cinematography: Jackson Rose
- Edited by: Leon Borgeau
- Distributed by: Metro-Goldwyn-Mayer
- Release date: July 12, 1941
- Running time: 10:53
- Country: United States
- Language: English

Robot Wrecks is a 1941 Our Gang short comedy film directed by Edward Cahn. It was the 200th Our Gang short to be released.

== Plot ==
Slicker sells the Our Gang kids some "invisible rays," with which they hope to power their homemade mechanical robot. Miracle of miracles, the robot not only begins to move, but actually performs several of the gang's household chores. In truth, the robot is being manipulated by Slicker's cohort Boxcar, but the kids do not learn this until their rampaging mechanical man nearly lays waste to the entire neighborhood.

== Cast ==
=== The Gang ===
- Mickey Gubitosi as Mickey
- Darla Hood as Darla
- George McFarland as Spanky
- Billy Laughlin as Froggy
- Billie Thomas as Buckwheat

=== Additional cast ===
- Vincent Graeff as Boxcar
- Freddie Walburn as Slicker
- Margaret Bert as Froggy's Mother
- Billy Bletcher as Froggy's father / Voice of Froggy's Mother
- Emmet Vogan as Robot owner
- Giovanna Gubitosi as Onlooker at robot demonstration

== See also ==
- Our Gang filmography
