= Good Bad Boys =

- Directed by: Edward Cahn
- Written by: Hal Law; Robert A. McGowan
- Produced by: Jack Chertok; Richard Goldstone for Metro-Goldwyn-Mayer
- Starring: George McFarland; Carl Switzer; Billie Thomas; Mickey Gubitosi; Leonard Landy; Freddie Walburn; Hugh Beaumont; Barbara Bedford; Al Hill
- Cinematography: Jackson Rose
- Edited by: Leon Bourgeau
- Distributed by: Metro-Goldwyn-Mayer
- Release date: September 7, 1940
- Running time: 10:58
- Country: United States
- Language: English

Good Bad Boys is a 1940 Our Gang short comedy film directed by Edward Cahn. It was the 192nd Our Gang short to be released.

== Plot ==
Slicker steals an orange from a fruit stand, and Alfalfa is wrongfully accused and punished for it. An angry Alfalfa decides to get even with his parents by embarking upon a life of crime. To that end, he enlists the other kids as his "mob." Hoping to deflect his pals from this drastic action, Spanky decides to teach the gang a lesson. He tricks the kids into thinking they have been burglarizing a house, when in fact they are merely helping their neighbor Mrs. Wilson clean out her junk.

Things take an unexpected turn when a real-life fugitive from justice chooses the gang's clubhouse as his hideout, with the cops hot on his heels. Assuming the police are after them, Alfalfa and the gang confess to their "crime," not knowing what the real crime committed by the real criminal was. The next morning they are arraigned and Spanky comes in with Mrs. Wilson to explain what had really happened. Meanwhile, Slicker is being arraigned with his mother for what seems to be an unrelated crime.

== Cast ==
=== The Gang ===
- Mickey Gubitosi as Mickey
- George McFarland as Spanky
- Carl Switzer as Alfalfa
- Billie Thomas as Buckwheat
- Leonard Landy as Leonard

=== Additional cast ===
- Freddie Walburn as Slicker
- Hugh Beaumont as Judge's assistant
- Barbara Bedford as Alfalfa's mother
- Margaret Bert as Slicker's mother
- Byron Foulger as Store owner, Mr. Stephens
- George Lessey as Judge Kincaid
- Al Hill as Burglar
- Liela McIntyre as Mrs. Wilson
- Roger Moore as Court Official (as Joe Young)
- William Newell as Alfalfa's father
- Harry Strang as Banker
- Emmett Vogan as Police officer

== See also ==
- Our Gang filmography
