= Farm Hands =

- Directed by: Herbert Glazer
- Written by: Hal Law; Robert A. McGowan
- Produced by: Metro-Goldwyn-Mayer
- Starring: Bobby Blake; Billy Laughlin; Billie Thomas; Mickey Laughlin; Murray Alper
- Cinematography: Jackson Rose
- Edited by: Leon Borgeau
- Distributed by: Metro-Goldwyn-Mayer
- Release date: June 19, 1943
- Running time: 10:26
- Country: United States
- Language: English

Farm Hands is a 1943 Our Gang short comedy film directed by Herbert Glazer. It was the 215th Our Gang short to be released.

== Plot ==
Moving out of their standard small-town surroundings, the gang visits the farm owned by Mickey's uncle where the youngsters attempt to milk a cow by placing two bottles under the udders and hoping that nature takes its course. The gang also feeds Mexican jumping beans to the chickens, are chased by an ornery mule, and end up stuck in a hay-baling machine.

== Cast ==
=== The Gang ===
- Bobby Blake as Mickey
- Billy Laughlin as Froggy
- Billie Thomas as Buckwheat
- Mickey Laughlin as Happy

=== Additional cast ===
- Murray Alper as Bill, Mickey's father

== Reception ==
This film was criticized by The New York Times, riddled with misfired directing and unconvincing performers. If the film had some of the past gangers like Spanky, Alfalfa, Stymie and Wheezer, it may have been a better film.

== See also ==
- Our Gang filmography
