= Don't Lie (film) =

- Directed by: Edward Cahn
- Written by: Hal Law; Robert A. McGowan
- Starring: George McFarland Billie Thomas; Mickey Gubitosi; Billy Laughlin; Billy Curtis; Emmett Vogan
- Cinematography: Walter Lundin
- Edited by: Leon Borgeau
- Production companies: Loew's; Metro-Goldwyn-Mayer
- Distributed by: Metro-Goldwyn-Mayer
- Release date: April 4, 1942
- Running time: 10:44
- Country: United States
- Language: English
- Budget: $19,212
- Box office: $26,274

Don't Lie is a 1942 Our Gang short comedy film directed by Edward Cahn. It was the 205th Our Gang short to be released.

== Plot ==
Buckwheat's accurate report of a wandering monkey is ignored because of his past fibs, with resulting confusion.

== Cast ==
=== The Gang ===
- Billie Thomas as Buckwheat
- Mickey Gubitosi as Mickey
- Billy Laughlin as Froggy
- George McFarland as Spanky

=== Additional cast ===
- Billy Curtis as Melinda, the chimp
- Emmett Vogan as Circus Official

== See also ==
- Our Gang filmography
