= All About Hash =

1940 film

- Directed by: Edward Cahn
- Written by: Hal Law; Robert A. McGowan
- Produced by: Jack Chertok; Richard Goldstone
- Starring: Mickey Gubitosi; George McFarland; Carl Switzer; Darla Hood; Billie Thomas
- Cinematography: Clyde De Vinna
- Edited by: Adrienne Fazan
- Distributed by: Metro-Goldwyn-Mayer
- Release date: March 20, 1940
- Running time: 10 minutes
- Country: United States
- Language: English

All About Hash is a 1940 Our Gang short comedy film directed by Edward Cahn. It was the 189th Our Gang short to be released.

== Plot ==
It seems that Mickey is upset over the fact that his parents spend every Monday night arguing. The reason: Mickey's mother invariably serves hash made from the Sunday-dinner leftovers, and Mickey's father hates hash. To teach the two adults a lesson, the Our Gang kids stage a skit on a local radio program, ending with a heartfelt plea by Mickey to stop the quarrelling.

== Notes ==
Janet Burston makes her Our Gang debut as a young radio contestant Mary Swivens singing "Tippi Tippi Tin".

== Cast ==
=== The Gang ===
- Mickey Gubitosi as Mickey Henry
- Darla Hood as Darla
- George McFarland as Spanky
- Carl Switzer as Alfalfa
- Billie Thomas as Buckwheat
- Leonard Landy as Leonard

=== Additional cast ===
- Janet Burston as Mary Swivens
- Barbara Bedford as Martha, Alfalfa's mother
- Louis Jean Heydt as Bob Henry, Mickey's father
- William Newell as Alfalfa's father
- Peggy Shannon as Edith Henry, Mickey's mother
- Ferris Taylor as Radio announcer
- Tommy McFarland as Extra
- Jo-Jo La Savio as Extra
- Harold Switzer as Extra

== See also ==
- Our Gang filmography
