= Family Troubles =

1943 film

- Directed by: Herbert Glazer
- Written by: Hal Law; Robert A. McGowan
- Starring: Janet Burston; Billy Laughlin; Bobby Blake; Billie Thomas; Mickey Laughlin; Dickie Hall; Beverly Hudson
- Cinematography: Walter Lundin
- Edited by: Leon Bourgeau
- Distributed by: Metro-Goldwyn-Mayer
- Release date: April 3, 1943
- Running time: 10:56
- Country: United States
- Language: English

Family Troubles is a one-reel comedy short subject and is an episode of the Our Gang series. It was released to theatres on April 3, 1943, produced and released by Metro-Goldwyn-Mayer. It was the 212th Our Gang short to be released.

== Plot ==
Janet feels that her parents no longer love her because they made her older sister the definite center of attention during her aunt's visit. Filled with anger and despair, she decides to run away. The gang volunteers to look for a family or couple who will "adapt" Janet. After naming off potential candidates, they decide on the elderly Mr. and Mrs. Tom and Mary Jones and escort Janet to their home. A neighbor boy who witnesses the exchange runs to the Burstons' house and inadvertently reports that Janet was kidnapped by a gang whose leader has a heavy voice (referring to Froggy). Janet's parents, Mary and Jasper, quickly call the police.

When the gang pay the Jones a visit and offer Janet to them, the Jones quickly realize that Janet is a runaway and decide to teach her and the gang a lesson. They agree to adopt her but make her life a living hell by forcing her to scrub the kitchen floor (which causes Janet to wail, "Why did I ever leave home?") and show where she will sleep (which is under the kitchen table). They even force her to give up all food in exchange for bread and water. When Mrs. Jones decides that Janet is unhappy enough, she and Mr. Jones leave the kitchen and Mr. Jones phones Janet's parents to retrieve her. But once they leave, Janet (with the help of the gang) runs away again.

The gang soon discover that the police are searching for them, so they run and hide in a cave. While trying to cook some food (a handful of potatoes), they burn them and create heavy smoke, which leaves their faces covered with soot and ashes. Once they see that the soot will hide their true identities, they bring Janet back home and tell Janet's parents why she wanted to run away.

Janet's family now realize how fortunate they are to have her. Mary apologizes for her unfeeling behavior and assures that it will never happen again. With everything happy, Froggy says, "All's well that ends well, I always say." Jasper corrects him, saying that Shakespeare originally said that phrase. "He did? Shucks!" answers a disappointed Froggy.

== Cast ==
=== The Gang ===
- Janet Burston as Janet Burston
- Bobby Blake as Mickey
- Billy Laughlin as Froggy
- Billie Thomas as Buckwheat
- Mickey Laughlin as Happy

=== Additional cast ===
- Dickie Hall as Kid informing Janet's family
- Beverly Hudson as Aurelia Burston
- Barbara Bedford as Mary Burston
- Harry C. Bradley as Tom Jones
- Elspeth Dudgeon as Aunt Aurelia
- Sarah Padden as Mary Jones
- Byron Shores as Jasper Burston

== See also ==
- Our Gang filmography

== Notes ==
The song that Janet's sister sings for her aunt is entitled "She May Have Seen Better Days." It was written by James Thornton and published in 1894 and was a hit in 1896 for George J. Gaskin. The short shows a net profit of $4,927.00 during the 1942-43 release season in MGM records.

== Sources ==
- Demoss, Robert: Family Troubles
- Maltin, Leonard and Richard W. Bann (1992). The Little Rascals: The Life and Times of Our Gang. Crown.
