= Benjamin Franklin, Jr. =

- Directed by: Herbert Glazer
- Written by: Hal Law; Robert A. McGowan
- Produced by: Metro-Goldwyn-Mayer
- Starring: Bobby Blake; Billie Thomas; Billy Laughlin; Janet Burston; Mickey Laughlin; Ernie Alexander; Barbara Bedford; Margaret Bert
- Cinematography: Charles Schoenbaum
- Edited by: Leon Borgeau
- Distributed by: Metro-Goldwyn-Mayer
- Release date: January 30, 1943
- Running time: 10:53
- Country: United States
- Language: English

Benjamin Franklin, Jr. is a 1943 Our Gang short comedy film directed by Herbert Glazer. It was the 211th Our Gang short to be released.

== Plot ==
The gang kids are upset that World War II is causing them deprivations and inconveniences. Organizing a fact-finding committee, Gang members Mickey, Froggy, Buckwheat, and Janet try to determine what to do about the present national crisis. With the help of a convenient copy of Benjamin Franklin's Poor Richard's Almanack, the kids stage a play in which they cathartically come to grips with the sacrifices indigenous to the war effort, and provide patriotic solutions to the situation.

== Cast ==
=== The Gang ===
- Bobby Blake as Mickey
- Janet Burston as Janet
- Billy Laughlin as Froggy
- Billie Thomas as Buckwheat
- Mickey Laughlin as Happy

=== Additional cast ===
- Ernie Alexander as John, Mickey's father
- Barbara Bedford as Janet's mother
- Margaret Bert as Martha, Mickey's mother
- Vincent Graeff as Club member put in his place
- Valerie Lee as Club member complaining about Jimmy Stewart
- Frank Ward as First club member to gripe
- Dickie Hall as Club member
- Barry Downing as Extra club member
- Elana Savona as Extra club member

== See also ==
- Our Gang filmography
