= Wedding Worries =

- Directed by: Edward Cahn
- Written by: Hal Law; Robert A. McGowan
- Produced by: Metro-Goldwyn-Mayer
- Starring: George McFarland; Billie Thomas; Darla Hood; Mickey Gubitosi; Billy Laughlin; Barbara Bedford; Margaret Bert; Byron Shores
- Cinematography: Jackson Rose
- Edited by: Leon Borgeau
- Distributed by: Metro-Goldwyn-Mayer
- Release date: December 13, 1941
- Running time: 10:51
- Country: United States
- Language: English

Wedding Worries is a 1941 Our Gang short comedy film directed by Edward Cahn. It was the 202nd Our Gang short to be released.

== Plot ==
Having read horror stories about wicked stepmothers, the gang is determined to break up the marriage between Darla Hood's widowed father and his new bride. Never bothering to find out, as Darla has, that the second Mrs. Hood is a wonderful woman, the kids pull off all sorts of pranks at the wedding ceremony, from playing the radio too loud to releasing a cylinder of laughing gas. The wedding guests start smiling then laughing as the gas fills the room. Someone in the building discovers what they're doing and shuts off the canister. The wedding is temporarily postponed and the gang is sentenced to a spanking, assembly-line style.

== Cast ==
=== The Gang ===
- Mickey Gubitosi as Mickey
- Darla Hood as Darla Hood
- Billy Laughlin as Froggy
- George McFarland as Spanky
- Billie Thomas as Buckwheat

=== Additional cast ===
- Barbara Bedford as Miss Douglas
- Margaret Bert as Delia the housekeeper
- Chester Clute as Judge Martin
- Sid D'Albrook as Mickey's father
- Ben Hall as Froggy's father
- William Irving as Guest
- Jack Lipson as Guest
- Stanley Logan as Father of the bride
- Byron Shores as Dr. James B. Hood
- Joe Young as Best man

== Notability ==
Wedding Worries marked the final appearance of Our Gang leading lady Darla Hood, after six years of service.

== See also ==
- Our Gang filmography
