= Tale of a Dog =

- Directed by: Cyril Endfield
- Written by: Hal Law; Robert A. McGowan
- Starring: Billie Thomas; Cordell Hickman; Bobby Blake; Billy Laughlin; Janet Burston
- Cinematography: Charles Salerno Jr.
- Edited by: Leon Bourgeau
- Distributed by: Metro-Goldwyn-Mayer
- Release date: April 15, 1944
- Running time: 10:46
- Country: United States
- Language: English
- Budget: $22,677

Tale of a Dog is a 1944 Our Gang short comedy film directed by Cyril Endfield. It was the 219th Our Gang short to be released, and the penultimate film in the series. Tale of a Dog was sold to theaters by Metro-Goldwyn-Mayer not as an Our Gang comedy but as part of its MGM Miniatures variety series.

== Plot ==
Buckwheat finds his friend Big Shot Jones moping about the train yard: it seems that Big Shot's father has ordered him to get rid of his dog. Instead of taking the dog to the pound, Big Shot intends to have him stow away on a train to Alabama. Buckwheat instead talks Big Shot into letting the gang adopt the dog, whom they name "Smallpox" (opting for a more interesting name for the spotted dog than "Spot"). However, when Froggy, Mickey, and Janet overhear Buckwheat and Big Shot's plans to "surprise them with S/smallpox," they fear the worst and call all their friends and the Greenpoint Board of Health. A panic grips the small town, with the gang's parents worried about their whereabouts and well-being, and the rest of the neighborhood kids running away from Buckwheat and Big Shot wherever they turn up.

Buckwheat and Big Shot are isolated (a term Buckwheat's mother misunderstands, resulting in her putting her child literally "on ice"), but when a doctor learns from Buckwheat that "Smallpox" refers to a dog, not the disease, the smallpox scare is declared a hoax. The mayor of Greenpoint lectures Froggy, Mickey, and Janet in spreading unsubstantiated rumors and sends them on their way. The gang agrees to adopt Smallpox...but make sure to change his name to "Spotty." Upon hearing the gang promise to feed him, Smallpox/Spotty turns to the camera and (via mouth animation) tells the audience (in a stereotypical southern African American dialect) "My, oh my; that shol' is good news!"

== Cast ==
=== The Gang ===
- Bobby Blake as Mickey Blake
- Janet Burston as Janet
- Billy Laughlin as Froggy Laughlin
- Billie Thomas as Buckwheat Thomas

=== Additional cast ===
- Cordell Hickman as Big Shot Jones
- Dickie Hall as Little kid
- Frank Ward as Kid grabbing Dickie
- Margaret Bert as Gossiper on phone
- Anita Bolster as Gossiper
- Willa Pearl Curtis as Buckwheat's mother
- Fern Emmett as Gossiper deciding to call the newspapers
- Emmett Vogan as Dr. Parkson
- Dorothy Newmann as Gossiper

== Notes ==
Dancing Romeo, released the same month as Tale of a Dog, was the last Our Gang comedy to be filmed and released. However, pre-production began on Dancing Romeo first, making Tale of a Dog the final film in the series to go into production. The final three films in the series were all directed by Cyril Endfield in late 1943, and released in April 1944.

Tale of a Dog was the only Our Gang film completed for the 1943-44 film season. Issuing the short under the MGM Miniatures banner resulted in it being the only one of the last five Our Gang shorts to make a profit, according to financial data prepared by MGM in 1956.

== See also ==
- Our Gang filmography
