= Come Back, Miss Pipps =

Come Back Miss Pipps
- Directed by: Edward Cahn
- Written by: Hal Law; Robert A. McGowan
- Starring: George McFarland; Billie Thomas; Darla Hood; Mickey Gubitosi; Billy Laughlin; Sara Haden; Clarence Wilson; Christian Rub
- Cinematography: Clyde De Vinna
- Edited by: Leon Borgeau
- Distributed by: Metro-Goldwyn-Mayer
- Release date: October 25, 1941
- Running time: 10:52
- Country: United States
- Language: English

Come Back Miss Pipps is a 1941 Our Gang short comedy film directed by Edward Cahn. It was the 198th Our Gang short to be released. The tile evokes MGM's British schoolteacher film Goodbye, Mr. Chips (1939) and was Clarence Wilson's final film appearance.

== Plot ==
Upon learning that Mr. Pratt, the mean old school board chairman, has fired their beloved teacher Miss Pipps because she threw a birthday party for one of her students during class, the gang decides to invite their parents to a special performance of a play exposing Pratt's injustices in running the school. As a result, he's demoted to caretaker, while Mr. Swenson is justifiably promoted to Pratt's former position...and Miss Pipps returns. Yet, compassion is shown to Mr. Pratt when his birthday is honored.

== Cast ==
=== The Gang ===
- Mickey Gubitosi as Mickey
- Darla Hood as Darla
- George McFarland as Spanky
- Billy Laughlin as Froggy
- Billie Thomas as Buckwheat

=== Additional cast ===
- Sara Haden as Miss Pipps
- Clarence Wilson as Alonzo K. Pratt
- Christian Rub as Mr. Swenson
- Barbara Bedford as Parent
- Billy Bletcher as Froggy's father
- Byron Foulger as Attourney Arthur Prince
- Leon Tyler as Kid playing "Mr. Smith"
- James Gubitosi as Extra
- Giovanna Gubitosi as Girl in audience
- Tommy McFarland as Extra
- Venita Vencent as Extra

== See also ==
- Our Gang filmography
