= Doing Their Bit =

Doing Their Bit may refer to:

- Doing Their Bit (1918 film series), a documentary film by Jennie Louise Touissant Welcome and her husband about African American soldiers in World War I
- Doing Their Bit (1918 film), a William Fox film by Kenean Buel about a pair of girls who discover spies
- Doing Their Bit: Wartime American Animated Short Films, 1939-1945 a book about American animated wartime propaganda films by Michael S. Shull and David E. Wilt
- Doin' Their Bit, a 1942 Our Gang comedy film
