= Doin' Their Bit =

- Directed by: Herbert Glazer
- Written by: Hal Law; Robert A. McGowan
- Starring: George McFarland; Billie Thomas; Mickey Gubitosi; Billy Laughlin; Janet Burston; Beverly Hudson; Walter Wills
- Cinematography: Jackson Rose
- Edited by: Leon Borgeau
- Music by: Lennie Hayton
- Production company: Metro-Goldwyn-Mayer
- Distributed by: Metro-Goldwyn-Mayer
- Release date: July 18, 1942
- Running time: 10:56
- Country: United States
- Language: English
- Budget: $28,306
- Box office: $24,651

Doin' Their Bit is a 1942 Our Gang short comedy film directed by Herbert Glazer. This was the first short with Herbert Glazer as Our Gang's regular director. It was the 207th Our Gang short to be released.

== Plot ==
Hoping to entertain the military troops stationed in Greenpoint, Mr. Wills organizes the gang into a junior USO troupe. In addition to performing a "boot camp" sketch, the gang participates in a brace of production numbers.

== Cast ==
=== The Gang ===
- Billy Laughlin as Froggy
- Janet Burston as Janet
- Mickey Gubitosi as Mickey
- George McFarland as Spanky
- Billie Thomas as Buckwheat

=== Additional cast ===
- Beverly Hudson as Miss Liberty
- Walter Wills as Mr. Wills
- Freddie Chapman as Messenger boy / Union of South Africa
- Vincent Graeff as Taxi driver / Poland
- Edward Soo Hoo as China
- Valerie Lee as Luxembourg
- Lawrence Long, Jr. as Milkman / Uruguay
- Freddie Walburn as Free France

== See also ==
- Our Gang filmography
