= Surprise party (disambiguation) =

A surprise party is a party arranged as a surprise.

Surprise party may also refer to:

- The Surprise Party (novel), a novel from the Fear Street series
- "The Surprise Party" (Smash), episode of television series Smash
- Surprise Party (film), a 1983 French comedy-drama film

== See also ==
- Surprised Parties, a 1942 Our Gang short comedy film
- Surprise Party, a publicity stunt campaign for President in 1940 by Gracie Allen
