= Don't Lie (disambiguation) =

"Don't Lie" is a 2005 song by the Black Eyed Peas.

Don't Lie may also refer to:

- Don't Lie (film), a 1942 Our Gang short comedy film
- "Don't Lie" (Trace Adkins song), 1999
- "Don't Lie", a song by the Chainsmokers, 2024
- "Don't Lie", a song by the Murmurs from Pristine Smut, 1997
- "Don't Lie", a song by Nik Kershaw, B-side of the single "Don Quixote", 1985
- "Don't Lie", a song by Snakefinger from Greener Postures, 1980
- "Don't Lie", a song from Wow! Wow! Wubbzy!, 2009
