= Three Smart Guys =

- Directed by: Edward Cahn
- Written by: Hal Law; Robert A. McGowan
- Produced by: Metro-Goldwyn-Mayer
- Starring: Bobby Blake; Billy Laughlin; Billie Thomas; Janet Burston; Edward Fielding; Marta Linden
- Cinematography: Jackson Rose
- Edited by: John D. Faure
- Distributed by: Metro-Goldwyn-Mayer
- Release date: October 23, 1943
- Running time: 10:39
- Country: United States
- Language: English

Three Smart Guys is a 1943 Our Gang short comedy film directed by Edward Cahn. It was the 217th Our Gang short to be released.

== Plot ==
Mickey, Froggy and Buckwheat devise a scheme to play hooky from school and go fishing. They misbehave in class in hopes that the teacher will expel them but instead are forced to stay after school. The next morning they decide to just play hooky and go fishing, but upon arriving at the river bank, the kids make the acquaintance of a friendly hobo (Edward Fielding), who advises them that they will never hook the "fish" of success unless they return to school. Duly chastened, the boys rush off to the schoolhouse just in time for the first bell.

== Cast ==
=== The Gang ===
- Bobby Blake as Mickey
- Billy Laughlin as Froggy
- Billie Thomas as Buckwheat
- Janet Burston as Janet

=== Additional cast ===
- Edward Fielding as The wise fisherman
- Marta Linden as Miss Pillsbury, teacher
- Marlene Kisker as Classroom extra
- Eleanor Taylor as Classroom extra

== Production notes ==
Plot devices for Three Smart Guys were borrowed from 1932's Readin' and Writin'.

Edward Cahn returned to direct this entry. Cyril Endfield then assumed directorial duties until production on the series ceased the following year.

== See also ==
- Our Gang filmography
