= Edward Fielding =

American actor

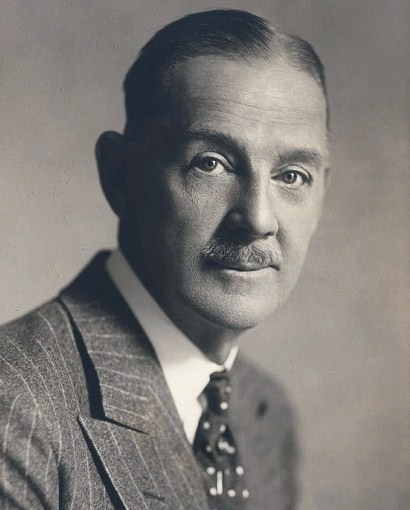
- around 1915
- Born: Edward B. Elkins; March 19, 1875; Brooklyn, New York, United States
- Died: January 10, 1945 (aged 69); Beverly Hills, California, United States
- Years active: 1905–1945 (secured)
- Spouse: Elizabeth Sherman Clark (1913–1945; his death) (1 child)

Edward Fielding (March 19, 1875 – January 10, 1945) was an American stage and film actor.

== Career ==
Edward Fielding appeared in nearly 40 Broadway productions between 1905 and 1939, often in leading roles. He played as a leading man with famous stage actresses like Olga Nethersole, Grace George, Ethel Barrymore and Laura Hope Crews. The tall and dignified-looking actor was especially known for his roles in the works of playwright Henrik Ibsen. Fielding also worked for some time as an actor in London. He appeared occasionally in silent films, most notably as Dr. Watson in Sherlock Holmes (1916) with William Gillette in the leading role.

Fielding came to Hollywood in 1939 and appeared in over 80 films during the last years of his life. He usually played bit parts or supporting roles. Fielding was a favorite of Alfred Hitchcock and played in four Hitchcock movies between 1940 and 1945. His best-known role for Hitchcock was perhaps Frith, the old butler, in Rebecca (1940). He also played supporting roles in films like Kitty Foyle (1940) with Ginger Rogers, Billy Wilder's American film debut The Major and the Minor (1942, as Rita Johnson's and Diana Lynn's father) and In This Our Life (1942) starring Bette Davis and Olivia de Havilland. Fielding was usually typecasted in dignified or respectable roles as a Doctor, Official, Judge, Priest or Butler.

== Death and personal life ==
Fielding collapsed and died of a heart attack while he mowed his lawn. He was two months shy of his 70th birthday. His wife, Elizabeth Sherman Clark (1883–1959), was a Metropolitan Opera star. They had one child.

== Partial filmography ==
- Sherlock Holmes (1916) - Dr. Watson
- The Runaway (1917) - Foster
- Magda (1917) - Kellner
- The Beautiful Adventure (1917) - Count Michael D'Eguzon
- The Eternal Temptress (1917) - Prince Estezary
- Seeing Things (1917)
- The Invisible Man Returns (1940) - Prison Governor (uncredited)
- Abe Lincoln in Illinois (1940) - Minor Role (uncredited)
- Vigil in the Night (1940) - Forest - Epidemic Doctor (uncredited)
- The House Across the Bay (1940) - Judge
- Rebecca (1940) - Frith
- All This, and Heaven Too (1940) - Dr. Louis
- Maryland (1940) - Chairrnan (uncredited)
- Junior G-Men (1940, Serial) - Professor Farraday [Chs. 9-10] (uncredited)
- Down Argentine Way (1940) - Willis Crawford
- East of the River (1940) - University President (uncredited)
- South of Suez (1940) - Judge
- Victory (1940) - Fetherston (uncredited)
- Kitty Foyle (1940) - Uncle Edgar
- So Ends Our Night (1941) - Durant
- Rage in Heaven (1941) - Governor (uncredited)
- I Wanted Wings (1941) - President of the Court
- Scotland Yard (1941) - Pickering
- In the Navy (1941) - Commander Giving Speech (uncredited)
- Blondie in Society (1941) - Blondie's Lawyer (uncredited)
- Blossoms in the Dust (1941) - Judge (uncredited)
- Our Wife (1941) - Dr. Mandel (uncredited)
- Parachute Battalion (1941) - Chief of Infantry
- Belle Starr (1941) - (uncredited)
- Badlands of Dakota (1941) - Councilman (uncredited)
- Hold Back the Dawn (1941) - American Consul (uncredited)
- Suspicion (1941) - Antique Shop Proprietor (uncredited)
- Skylark (1941) - Scholarly Man in Subway Car
- Star Spangled Rhythm (1942) - Y. Frank Freemont (uncredited)
- In This Our Life (1942) - Dr. Buchanan
- Pacific Rendezvous (1942) - Secretary of the Navy
- Ten Gentlemen from West Point (1942) - William Eustis
- Beyond the Blue Horizon (1942) - Judge Chase
- The Pride of the Yankees (1942) - Clinic Doctor
- The Major and the Minor (1942) - Colonel Hill
- Random Harvest (1942) - Prime Minister (uncredited)
- Shadow of a Doubt (1943) - Doctor on Train (uncredited)
- Flight for Freedom (1943) - Rear Admiral Sturges (uncredited)
- Submarine Alert (1943) - Shipping Merchant (uncredited)
- Flesh and Fantasy (1943) - Sir Thomas (uncredited)
- It's a Great Life (1943) - Attorney Schuster #1 (uncredited)
- Mr. Lucky (1943) - Foster - Dorothy's Butler (uncredited)
- Crime Doctor (1943) - Governor (uncredited)
- Pilot No. 5 (1943) - Dean Barrett (uncredited)
- Good Luck, Mr. Yates (1943) - Colonel Fredericks (uncredited)
- Salute to the Marines (1943) - Preacher (uncredited)
- Three Smart Guys (1943, Short) - Fisherman
- Government Girl (1943) - Mr. Benson (uncredited)
- Higher and Higher (1943) - Minister (uncredited)
- Madame Curie (1943) - Board Member (uncredited)
- The Song of Bernadette (1943) - Doctor with Empress' Baby (uncredited)
- What a Woman! (1943) - Sen. Howard Ainsley
- Tender Comrade (1943) - Doctor (uncredited)
- Lady in the Dark (1944) - Dr. Carlton
- See Here, Private Hargrove (1944) - Gen. Dillon
- The Story of Dr. Wassell (1944) - Adm. Hart (uncredited)
- Mr. Skeffington (1944) - Justice of the Peace (uncredited)
- Marine Raiders (1944) - Commander of Camp Elliott (uncredited)
- Wilson (1944) - Minor Role (uncredited)
- My Pal Wolf (1944) - Secretary of War
- Mrs. Parkington (1944) - Rev. Pilbridge (uncredited)
- The Very Thought of You (1944) - Prof. Cathcart (uncredited)
- Dead Man's Eyes (1944) - Stanley Hayden
- Belle of the Yukon (1944) - C.V. Atterbury
- Ministry of Fear (1944) - Ministry Executive (uncredited)
- The Man in Half Moon Street (1945) - Col. Ashley (uncredited)
- Having Wonderful Crime (1945) - Dr. Newcomb (uncredited)
- A Medal for Benny (1945) - Governor (uncredited)
- The Beautiful Cheat (1945) - Dr. Pennypacker
- Guest Wife (1945) - Arnold
- Spellbound (1945) - Dr. Anthony Edwardes (uncredited)
- Hold That Blonde (1945) - J.W. Kellogg (uncredited)
- Saratoga Trunk (1945) - Mr. Bowers (uncredited)
- Colonel Effingham's Raid (1946) - Mr. Clyde Manadue (uncredited)
- Cinderella Jones (1946) - Dean Barker (uncredited) (final film role)
