= Walter Lundin =

American cinematographer

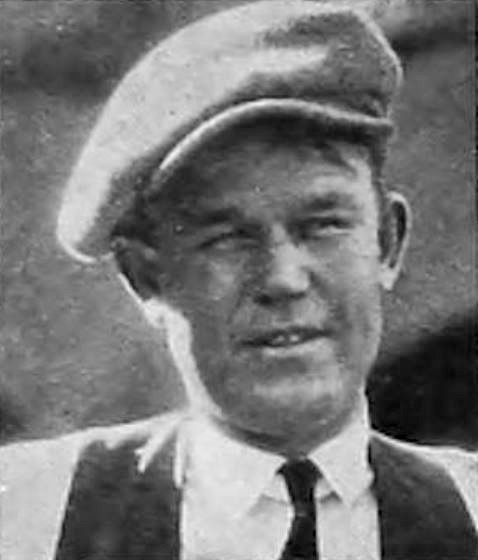
- From a 1926 magazine
- Born: April 20, 1892; Chicago, Illinois, U.S.
- Died: June 21, 1954 (aged 62); Los Angeles County, California, U.S.
- Occupation: Cinematographer
- Spouse: Phyllis Byrne (m. 1931)

Walter Lundin (April 20, 1892 – June 21, 1954) was an American cinematographer who worked extensively in Hollywood during the silent film era and had a career through the 1950s.

He was known for his work in films with Laurel and Hardy and Harold Lloyd (among them, Safety Last! and Grandma's Boy), and had a longtime collaboration with producer Hal Roach. Lloyd and his crew nicknamed Walter "The Dude".

== Selected filmography ==
- Mothers of Men (1917)
- A Sailor-Made Man (1921)
- Grandma's Boy (1922)
- Dr. Jack (1922)
- Safety Last! (1923)
- Why Worry? (1923)
- Girl Shy (1924)
- Hot Water (1924)
- The Freshman (1925)
- For Heaven's Sake (1926)
- The Kid Brother (1927)
- Welcome Danger (1929)
- Movie Crazy (1932)
- The Cat's-Paw (1934)
- Bonnie Scotland (1935)
- Night Cargo (1936)
- The Bohemian Girl (1936)
- General Spanky (1936)
- Way Out West (1937)
- Quicker'n a Wink (1940)
- Going to Press (1942)
- Don't Lie (1942)
- Surprised Parties (1942)
- Harrigan's Kid (1943)
- Air Raid Wardens (1943)
- Adventure in Music (1944)
- Radio Bugs (1944)
- Gentle Annie (1944)
