= School Begins =

1928 film

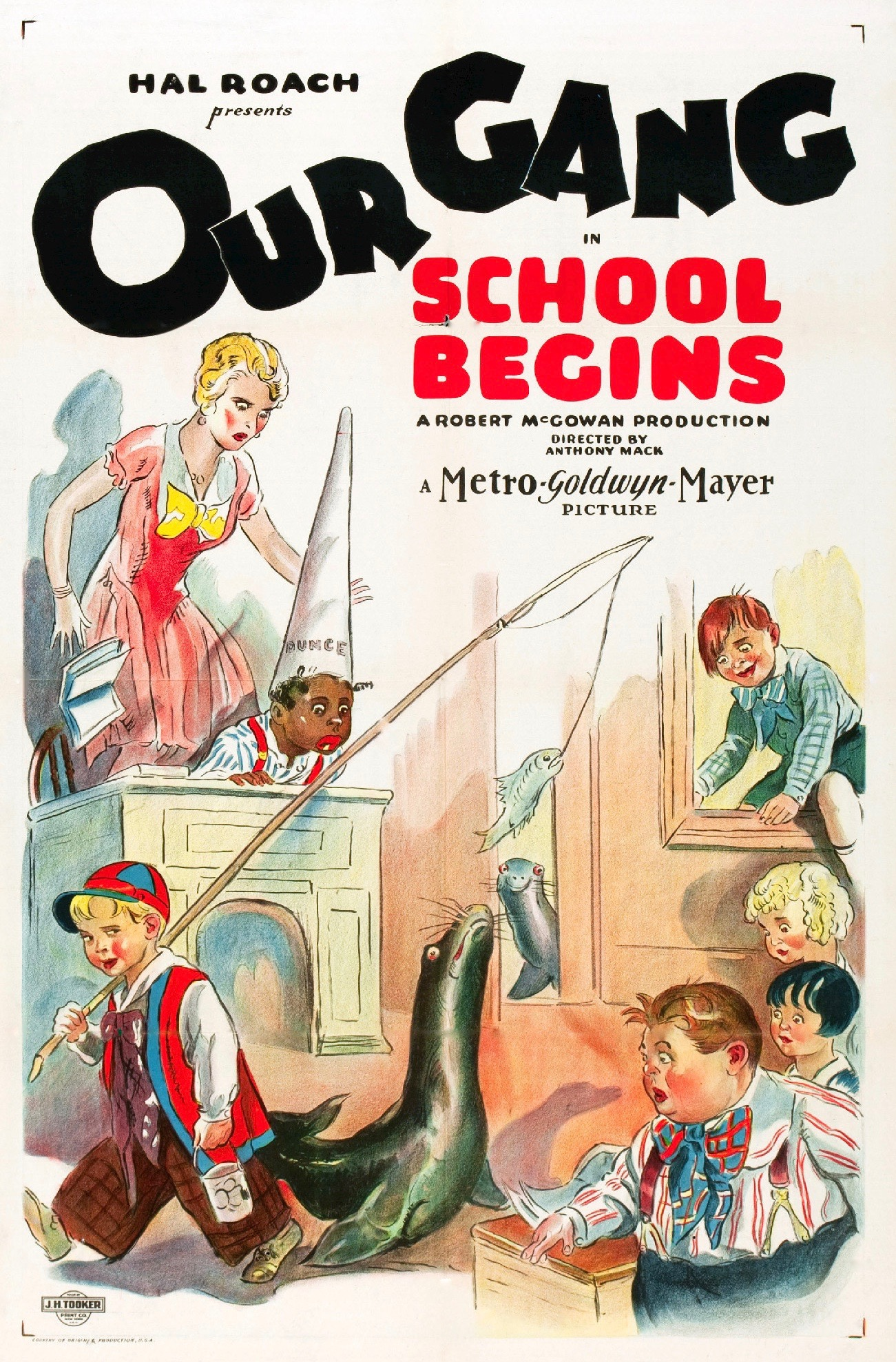
- Film poster
- Directed by: Anthony Mack
- Written by: Robert A. McGowan; H. M. Walker
- Produced by: Robert F. McGowan; Hal Roach
- Cinematography: Art Lloyd
- Edited by: Richard C. Currier
- Distributed by: Metro-Goldwyn-Mayer
- Release date: November 17, 1928
- Running time: 20 minutes
- Country: United States
- Languages: Silent; English intertitles

School Begins is a 1928 Our Gang short silent comedy film, the 79th in the series, directed by Anthony Mack. It had been considered lost, as it was destroyed in the 1965 MGM vault fire. However, a copy is preserved in the Museum of Modern Art in New York.

== Cast ==
=== The Gang ===
- Joe Cobb as Joe
- Jean Darling as Jean
- Allen Hoskins as Farina
- Bobby Hutchins as Wheezer
- Mary Ann Jackson as Mary Ann
- Harry Spear as Harry
- Jimmy Farren as Our Gang member
- Pete the Pup as Petie

=== Additional cast ===
- May Wallace as Harry's mother

== See also ==
- Our Gang filmography
