= Marines in the Making =

- Directed by: Herbert Polesie
- Produced by: Pete Smith
- Starring: R.E. 'Dick' Hanley
- Narrated by: Pete Smith
- Cinematography: Richard Fryer
- Music by: Max Terr
- Release date: December 26, 1942
- Running time: 9 minutes
- Country: United States
- Language: English

Marines in the Making is a 1942 short propaganda film produced by Metro-Goldwyn-Mayer about the United States Marine Corps. It was nominated for an Academy Award for Best Short Subject, One-reel in 1943. The film highlights U.S. Marine Corps combat training methods during the first year of World War II, including intense conditioning techniques, hand-to-hand combat tactics, and traditional Marine drills.

== See also ==
- List of Allied propaganda films of World War II
