= Dancing Romeo =

1944 film by Cy Endfield

- Directed by: Cyril Endfield
- Written by: Hal Law; Robert A. McGowan
- Starring: Billy Laughlin; Bobby Blake; Janet Burston; Billie Thomas; Valerie Lee; Bobby Browning
- Cinematography: Charles Salerno Jr.
- Edited by: Leon Bourgeau
- Music by: Max Terr
- Distributed by: Metro-Goldwyn-Mayer
- Release date: April 29, 1944
- Running time: 10:50
- Country: United States
- Language: English
- Budget: $27,353

Dancing Romeo is a 1944 Our Gang short comedy film directed by Cyril Endfield. Produced and released by Metro-Goldwyn-Mayer, it was the 220th and final Our Gang short to be released.

== Plot ==
Froggy has a crush on a young girl named Marilyn, who is too preoccupied with her budding career as a dancer to pay Froggy attention. When the gang attends one of Marilyn's recitals, Froggy finds himself insanely jealous of Marilyn's dancing partner Gerald, whom he sees as a rival for Marilyn's affections.

A few days later, Froggy holds a dance recital of his own, hoping to impress Marilyn. His seemingly gravity-defying moves are accomplished with the help of Mickey and Buckwheat, who've rigged their pal with wires and control his movements via a pulley. Gerald exposes this artifice, hoping to embarrass Froggy. Marilyn, however, is impressed by Froggy's determination, and tells him she loves him—only to have the deep-voiced boy faint dead away.

== Cast ==
=== The Gang ===
- Billy Laughlin as Froggy
- Bobby Blake as Mickey
- Janet Burston as Janet
- Billie Thomas as Buckwheat

=== Additional cast ===
- Bobby Browning as Gerald
- Valerie Lee as Marylin
- Vincent Graeff as Sits behind Gerald at Froggy's performance
- Dickie Hall as Boy who figured Froggy has been dancing for years
- Frank Ward as Boy who can't wait to see Froggy dance

== Production ==
Dancing Romeo was the final short to be released in the 22-year Our Gang canon. Its antecedent on the release schedule, Tale of a Dog, is sometimes considered the final film in the series, as it has a later production number (no. 2866 vs. Dancing Romeo's production no. 2861) and began pre-production first.

Along with Tale of a Dog and Radio Bugs, Dancing Romeo was directed by Cyril Endfield in late 1943, and released in April 1944. According to financial data prepared by MGM in 1956, Dancing Romeo cost $27,353 to produce, but lost $10,340—more than any other Our Gang short—at the box office. By 1943, the series had ceased to be profitable, leading to its cancellation.

Our Gang creator Hal Roach would revive the Our Gang concept for a pair of late-1940s features, Curley and Who Killed Doc Robbin. Our Gang did not become profitable again until Hal Roach bought back the 1927-1938 Roach-produced Our Gang comedies (excluding General Spanky) from MGM in 1949 and later syndicated the Roach-produced shorts to television as The Little Rascals (and, after 1950, several theatrical reissues through Monogram Pictures and Allied Artists), leading to its renewed popularity from the 1950s on.

== See also ==
- Our Gang filmography
- List of American films of 1944
