= Max Terr =

American pianist, arranger, band leader, and film composer

- Born: November 16, 1889; Odessa, Kherson Governorate, Russian Empire
- Died: August 2, 1951 (aged 61) Santa Monica, California, U.S.
- Genres: Jazz
- Occupation: Pianist, bandleader, arranger, film composer
- Instrument: Piano
- Years active: 1918–1950
- Labels: Perfect, Pathé

Maxwell J. Terr (November 16, 1889 – August 2, 1951) was a Russian-born American pianist, arranger, bandleader, and film composer, best known for his Oscar-nominated score for the 1942 version of Charlie Chaplin's The Gold Rush and for the march theme of MGM's Metro News.

== Early life and career ==
Born in Odessa, Terr was the child of Boruch Lozar Terr and Celia Pollach. In the summer of 1890, having not yet reached his first birthday, Terr and his family emigrated to the United States, arriving in New York City on August 15.

As of August 1912, while residing on Manhattan's Upper East Side, Terr attended Columbia University.

Beginning in the mid-1920s, Terr's radio career featured a longstanding collaboration—as choral director—with composer Meredith Willson; he also served as arranger for The A&P Gypsies, bandleader and arranger for singer Lee Morse, choir director on Shell Chateau and Good News of 1938, and musical director on Family Theater. He also provided one-on-one vocal coaching for performers such as Virginia Weidler.

Commenting in August 1931 on what he perceived as the recent dumbing down of American dance music, bandleader Harry Horlick—Terr's fellow A&P Gypsies staffer—maintained that "[f]ar more effective dance music can be played by resorting to subtle harmonies and subtle syncopations. Schumann himself proved that syncopated rhythms could be beautiful to listen to. The dance music we will play will be specially arranged by Max Terr and will sparkle and scintillate, and flow along smoothly, melodiously, brilliantly."

== Personal life and death ==
Terr was wed at least three times, each of the first two marriages ending via divorce in five years or less. From 1916 until 1920, he was married to Jennie A. Itzkowitz and, from 1925 to 1930, to Lena Snitz. On June 6, 1934, he married Eva Pollack Altschuler, and, as of April 1950, Terr's U.S. Census entry listed him as "divorced."

On August 2, 1951, Terr died of lung cancer at age 61 in Santa Monica, California. On August 6, his cremated remains were interred at Rosedale Cemetery in Los Angeles. Not quite three months later, at the request of his only surviving relative, half-sister Serafrina Harmon, Terr's remains were removed and re-interred at Mount Carmel Cemetery in Bell Gardens, California.

== Legacy ==
On May 7, 1952, composer Meredith Willson—on whose radio programs Terr had served as choir director for roughly two decades—appeared on the new Ed Murrow-hosted radio series This I Believe to pay tribute to his late friend and colleague, focusing especially on Terr's extraordinary dedication to finding or devising ergonomic improvements, as well as his exceeding generosity in sharing the fruits of his research. Shortly thereafter, Willson's statement was published in the Des Moines Register and—in slightly edited form—in the Los Angeles Times; later that year it appeared—as "Maxie's Recipe for Happiness"—in a book-length compilation of TIB transcripts published by Murrow.

Many men feel a fervent need to leave a son to carry on their name; noncreative people envy the Shakespeares and the Beethovens [...] Maybe it's this kind of frustration that caused Henry Thoreau to remark, "The mass of men live lives of quiet desperation." Well, I had a friend by the name of Max Terr. and Max taught me that genius is by no means an essential for escape from this "quiet desperation." Max had been associated with me as choral director for the past 20 years or so. Max was interested in almost everything and, considering that he was also a perfectionist, his interest was always a very intense one ... even if it was only in a pencil. [...] Since Max has gone not a day passes that isn't a pleasanter day because of the things he left behind. [...] In every room of our apartment there are memories of Max Terr. And lots of our friends swear by his patiently discovered items ... passing them along to their friends ... praising "Maxie's cookies ... "Maxie's music paper" ... "Maxie's pencils...and piano light" without ever having known Max Terr. So I guess I believe pretty firmly that you don't have to be a Beethoven or a Rembrandt, or even a father to leave a heritage to the mortal world [...] Anyhow, I think if I leave behind me the kind of things that keep Max Terr alive in the hearts of his fellows, I will have justified my brief hour of strutting and fretting upon the stage.

== Partial filmography ==
- The Love Parade (1929) – Composer (uncredited)
- The Vagabond King (1930) — Composer (uncredited)
- The Silent Enemy (1930) — Composer (uncredited)
- Poppy (1936) — Vocal effects
- Snow White and the Seven Dwarfs (1937) – Vocal and choral supervisor
- Thrill of a Lifetime (1937) – Vocal director
- Hawaii Calls (1938) – Choral director
- Sing You Sinners (1938) – Vocal arranger
- Everything's on Ice (1939) — Composer (uncredited)
- Fisherman's Wharf (1939) – Choir director (uncredited)
- What a Life (1939) - Choir director, vocal coach
- Those Were the Days! (1940) – Choir director
- The Greenie (Short, 1942) — Composer
- Marines in the Making (Short, 1942) — Composer (uncredited)
- The Gold Rush (1942) – Composer
- Portrait of a Genius (Short, 1943) — Composer
- Fala: The President's Dog (Short, 1943) — Composer (uncredited)
- Calling All Kids (Short, 1943) — Composer
- Inca Gold (Short, 1943) — Composer
- Heavenly Music (Short, 1943) – Composer
- Dancing Romeo (Short, 1944) – Composer
- Stairway to Light (Short, 1945) – Composer
- The Great Morgan (1946) – Composer
