= Janet Burston =

American child actress (1935–1998)

- Born: Janet Elizabeth Burston; January 11, 1935
- Died: March 3, 1998 (aged 63)
- Occupation: Child actress
- Years active: 1940–1964

Janet Elizabeth Burston (January 11, 1935 – March 3, 1998) was an American child actress who was the final leading lady in the Our Gang short subjects series, replacing Darla Hood in 1942.

== Career ==
Burston was discovered and trained by Maurie Rubens at the Reubens Workshop .

She began her film career in the Our Gang film All About Hash as a background child character in 1940 at age five. Burston stayed as a background character for two years before replacing Darla Hood as leading lady in 1941.

In March 1942, she was signed to a seven year contract with MGM, and debuted in "Doing Our Bit"

She stayed with the gang until the end of the series in 1944. She appeared in a few outside films, including Blondie Goes Latin (1941) and Ginger (1946).

Burston left show business in 1964. After her retirement from acting, she kept a low profile and attended few Our Gang reunions.

== Personal life ==
Janet Burston was the daughter of Lester F. Burston of Oakland, California. She married four times. Burston died in her sleep on March 3, 1998. She was 63.

== Our Gang filmography ==
1. All About Hash (1940)
2. Waldo's Last Stand (1940)
3. Baby Blues (1941)
4. Melodies Old and New (1942)
5. Surprised Parties (1942)
6. Doin' Their Bit (1942)
7. Rover's Big Chance (1942)
8. Benjamin Franklin, Jr. (1943)
9. Family Troubles (1943)
10. Calling All Kids (1943)
11. Election Daze (1943)
12. Little Miss Pinkerton (1943)
13. Three Smart Guys (1943)
14. Radio Bugs (1944)
15. Tale of a Dog (1944)
16. Dancing Romeo (1944)
