= Jacqueline Taylor =

Former provost and vice president for academic affairs at The College of New Jersey

Jacqueline Taylor (born 1951) was the provost and vice president for academic affairs at The College of New Jersey from 2013-2018.

== Biography ==
Jacqueline Taylor was born in Kentucky, 1951. After receiving her bachelor's in English and communications arts from Georgetown College and her master's and doctoral degrees from the University of Texas in Austin, Taylor completed the Management Development program at Harvard Graduate School of Education in 1996.

She is the founding dean of DePaul University's College of Communication and has been with the university for more than thirty years. In that time, she has served as associate vice president for academic affairs, founding director of DePaul's Humanities Center, the associate dean of graduate studies in LA&S, and the director of women's studies program. She was an American Council on Education Fellow in 2005–2006, with a placement at Kent State University, the most prestigious higher education leadership development program in the country.

She published her memoir, Waiting for the Call: From Preacher’s Daughter to Lesbian Mom, in 2007. It was a finalist in the 2008 Lambda Literary Awards for best lesbian memoir/biography. She was interviewed about the book by Vanessa Bush on Chicago Public Radio's Eight Forty-Eight.

Taylor previously published Grace Paley: Illuminating the Dark Lives, the first book-length study of Paley's work, and co-edited, Voices Made Flesh: Performing Women’s Autobiography. Her writing has also appeared in Text and Performance Quarterly, where she is also on the editorial board, Southern Speech Communication Journal, CALYX: A Journal of Art and Literature by Women and Women’s Studies in Communication. In November 2010, she published "Rapid Change as the Constant" in the National Communication Association publication Spectra. She had previously served as the director of the finance board for the NCA, as well as the chairperson of the Performance Studies Division.

On July 1, 2011, issue of the Chicago Sun-Times, the day the Illinois Civil Union law took effect, Taylor published an editorial, "Am I married? I want to say 'yes'" and on July 28 she will be on the panel of "Rediscovering Literature by Women" with Ruth Goring and Ellen Savage at the Chicago Public Library.
