= Hal Law =

American film director (1904–80)

- Born: Hal Law; February 21, 1904; Chicago, Illinois
- Died: November 14, 1980 (aged 76); Los Angeles, California
- Occupations: screenwriter, Film director
- Years active: 1930s-1940s

Hal Law (February 21, 1904 - November 14, 1980) was an American short comedy film screenwriter and director. Hal was involved during the 1930s and 1940s, known for short films such as Goin' Fishin', 1-2-3 Go, Fightin' Fools, and Baby Blues as part of the Our Gang, a series of American comedy short produced by Metro-Goldwyn-Mayer.

== Biography ==
Born in Chicago, Illinois Hall is best known as a Hal Roach Studios director of the Our Gang short subjects film and as the co-writer, along with Robert A. McGowan, of the series that was produced by Metro-Goldwyn-Mayer. Hal died on November 14, 1980, in Los Angeles, California.

== Filmography ==
- Hired Husband (1947)
- Dancing Romeo (1944)
- Tale of a Dog (1944)
- Radio Bugs (1944)
- Three Smart Guys (1943)
- Little Miss Pinkerton (1943)
- Election Daze (1943)
- Farm Hands (1943)
- Family Troubles (1943)
- Benjamin Franklin, Jr. (1943)
- Unexpected Riches (1942)
- Mighty Lak a Goat (1942)
- Rover's Big Chance (1942)
- Surprised Parties (1942)
- Don't Lie (1942)
- Going to Press (1942)
- Wedding Worries (1941)
- Come Back, Miss Pipps (1941)
- Helping Hands (1941)
- Robot Wrecks (1941)
- 1-2-3 Go! (1941
- Fightin' Fools (1941)
- Baby Blues (1941)
- Kiddie Kure (1940)
- Goin' Fishin' (1940)
- Waldo's Last Stand (1940)
- Good Bad Boys (1940)
- Bubbling Troubles (1940)
- The New Pupil (1940)
- All About Hash (1940)
- The Big Premiere (1940)
- Alfalfa's Double (1940)
- Time Out for Lessons (1939)
- Dad for a Day (1939)
- Captain Spanky's Show Boat (1939)
- Auto Antics (1939)
- Joy Scouts (1939)
- Cousin Wilbur (1939)
- Clown Princes (1939)
- Duel Personalities (1939)
- Tiny Troubles (1939)
- Alfalfa's Aunt (1939)
- Practical Jokers (1938)
- Football Romeo (1938)
- Men in Fright (1938)
- Aladdin's Lantern (1938)
- The Little Ranger (1938)
