= Robert A. McGowan =

American film director (1901–1955)

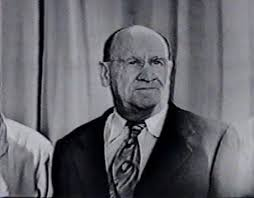
- Robert Anthony McGowan
- Born: Robert Anthony McGowan; May 22, 1901; Denver, Colorado, U.S.
- Died: June 20, 1955 (aged 54); Los Angeles, California, U.S.
- Occupations: Film director, screenwriter
- Children: 1
- Relatives: Robert F. McGowan (uncle)

Robert Anthony McGowan (May 22, 1901 – June 20, 1955) was an American screenwriter and film director.

== Biography ==
Born in Denver, McGowan is best known as a junior director for the Our Gang short subjects film series from 1926 to 1930, and as the co-writer of the series during the Metro-Goldwyn-Mayer period from 1938 to 1944. McGowan was named for his uncle, Our Gang senior director Robert F. McGowan. Since both Robert McGowans worked on the series, Robert Anthony McGowan was usually credited as Anthony Mack.

McGowan directed a number of Our Gang entries in the late-1920s. He appears on-screen in the 1932 short Free Wheeling, in which he is socked by a boxing glove attached to the kids' makeshift taxi.

== Personal ==
McGowan married Madeline Rosselle, the daughter of a choreographer, and had two children. His daughter Mickie McGowan (1938-2022) was a voice actor, casting agent, and ADR director. McGowan's personal memorabilia was destroyed.

== Death ==
His career came to an end during the Communist "witch hunt" era of the late-1940s, during which he was blacklisted for associating with blacklisted screenwriters. He died in Los Angeles, California on June 20, 1955, five months after his uncle, at the age of 54.

== Selected filmography ==
=== Screenwriter ===
- When the Wind Blows (1930)
- Men in Fright (1938)
- Football Romeo (1938)
- Captain Spanky's Showboat (1939)
- Dad for a Day (1939)
- Alfalfa's Aunt (1939)
- Come Back, Miss Pipps (1939)
- Cousin Wilbur (1939)
- Bubbling Troubles (1940)
- The New Pupil (1940)
- Wedding Worries (1941)
- Robot Wrecks (1941)
- Don't Lie (1942)
- Doin' Their Bit (1942)
- Surprised Parties (1942)
- Election Daze (1943)
- Little Miss Pinkerton (1943)
- Family Troubles (1943)
- Farm Hands (1943)
- Benjamin Franklin, Jr. (1943)
- Radio Bugs (1944)
- Dancing Romeo (1944)
- Gas House Kids Go West (1947)

=== Director ===
- War Feathers (1926)
- Telling Whoppers (1926)
- Bring Home the Turkey (1927)
- Ten Years Old (1927)
- Tired Business Men (1927)
- Olympic Games (1927)
- Chicken Feed (1927)
- Heebee Jeebees (1927)
- Dog Heaven (1927)
- Playin' Hookey (1928)
- Rainy Days (1928)
- Edison, Marconi & Co. (1928)
- School Begins (1928)
- Growing Pains (1928)
- Old Gray Hoss (1928)
- Election Day (1929)
- The Holy Terror (1929)
- Boxing Gloves (1929)
- Cat, Dog, & Co. (1929)
- Shivering Shakespeare (1930)
