= Billy Laughlin =

American child actor (1932–1948)

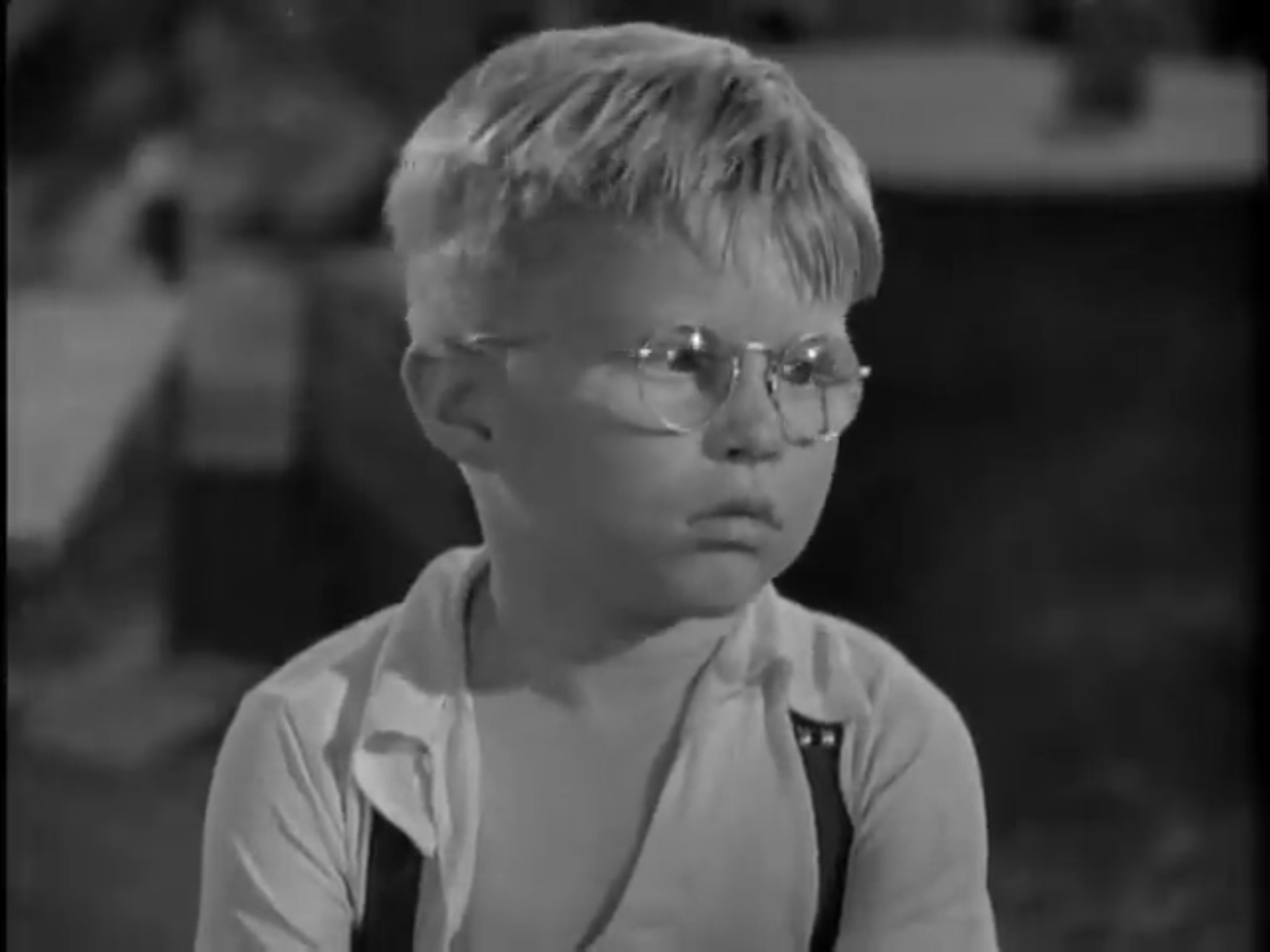
- Laughlin in Waldo's Last Stand (1940)
- Born: William Robert Laughlin; July 5, 1932; San Gabriel, California, U.S.
- Died: August 31, 1948 (aged 16); La Puente, California, U.S.
- Cause of death: Traffic collision
- Resting place: Rose Hills Memorial Park, Whittier, California
- Occupation: Child actor
- Years active: 1940–1948

William Robert Laughlin (July 5, 1932 – August 31, 1948) was an American child actor. He is best known for playing the character Froggy in the Our Gang short films from 1940 to 1944, the films′ final years of production.

== Early life ==
Laughlin was born on July 5, 1932, in San Gabriel, California, to Robert Vine Laughlin (August 28, 1901 – September 30, 1972) and Charlotte C. Cruikshank (March 11, 1903 – June 4, 1992). According to Our Gang actor Robert Blake, Laughlin was "dearly loved".

== Career ==
Laughlin rose to fame at the age of eight when he appeared in his first Our Gang film, The New Pupil, as "Harold" in 1940. He worked in support of Alfalfa Switzer in his first three films and then replaced the now-too-old Switzer as the comic lead of the group with the 1941 films. His character was known for his strange, guttural voice, which was reminiscent of a frog's croak. Laughlin's last Our Gang short film was the last film of the series in 1944 called Dancing Romeo. Laughlin did the voice himself without dubbing, basing it on a Popeye impersonation he had been doing for friends.

When Our Gang stopped production in 1944, Laughlin appeared in a cameo in Monogram's Johnny Doesn't Live Here Any More, his only non-Our Gang film, speaking in his natural voice for the only time on film.

== Death ==
Laughlin died at a hospital on August 31, 1948, after colliding with a speeding truck while riding with a friend on a Cushman motor scooter. He was delivering newspapers near his home in La Puente, California. The 16-year-old friend who was operating the scooter, John Wilbrand, made a U-turn in front of the truck, but survived with minor injuries. The scooter was given to Laughlin by his parents two weeks prior to the accident. Laughlin is interred in a grave at the Rose Hills Memorial Park Cemetery in Whittier, California, next to his parents.
