= Billie "Buckwheat" Thomas =

American child actor (1931–1980)

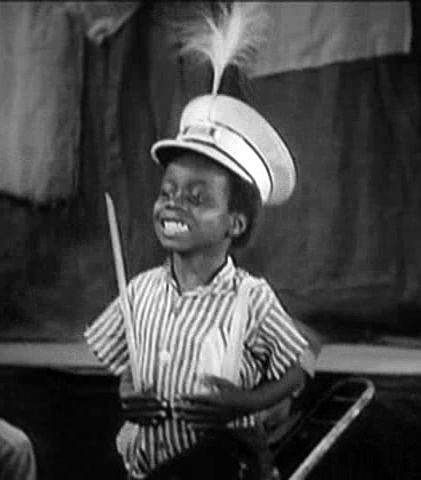
- Thomas as "Buckwheat" in Our Gang Follies of 1938
- Born: William Thomas Jr. March 12, 1931; Los Angeles, California, U.S.
- Died: October 10, 1980 (aged 49); Los Angeles, California, U.S.
- Occupation: Child actor
- Years active: 1935–1944
- Children: 1

William Thomas Jr. (March 12, 1931 – October 10, 1980) was an American child actor best remembered for portraying the character of Buckwheat in the Our Gang (Little Rascals) short films from 1934 until the series' end in 1944. He was a native of Los Angeles.

== Our Gang ==
Billie Thomas first appeared in the 1934 Our Gang shorts For Pete's Sake!, The First Round-Up, and Washee Ironee as a background player. The "Buckwheat" character was a girl at this time, portrayed by Our Gang kid Matthew "Stymie" Beard's younger sister Carlena in For Pete's Sake!, and by Willie Mae Walton in three other shorts.

Thomas began appearing as "Buckwheat" with 1935's Mama's Little Pirate. Despite Thomas being a boy, the Buckwheat character remained a girl—dressed as a Topsy-esque image of the African-American "pickaninny" stereotype with bowed pigtails, a large hand-me-down sweater and oversized boots. After Stymie's departure from the series later in 1935, the Buckwheat character slowly morphed into a boy, first referred to definitively as a "he" in 1936's The Pinch Singer. This is similar to the initial handling of another African-American Our Gang member, Allen "Farina" Hoskins, who worked in the series during the silent and early sound eras.

Despite the change in the Buckwheat character's gender, Billie Thomas's androgynous costuming was not changed until his appearance in the 1936 film Pay as You Exit. This new costuming – overalls, striped shirt, oversized shoes, and a large unkempt afro – was retained for the series until the end. The reason for the change in appearance was so he could portray, in the 1936 Our Gang feature film General Spanky, a five-year-old slave asking men on a riverboat and, subsequently, shoeshine boy Spanky, "You be my master?". In his Classic Movie Guide write-up for the film, Leonard Maltin surmises that "Buckwheat's role as slave in search of a master may displease contemporary audiences."

Thomas remained in Our Gang for ten years, appearing in all but one of the shorts, Feed 'em and Weep (due to sickness; fellow child actor Philip Hurlic filled in for him), made from Washee Ironee in 1934 through the series' end in 1944. During the first half of his Our Gang tenure, Thomas's Buckwheat character was often paired with Eugene "Porky" Lee as a tag-along team of "little kids" rallying against (and often outsmarting) the "big kids", George "Spanky" McFarland and Carl "Alfalfa" Switzer. Thomas had a speech impairment as a young child, as did Lee, who became Thomas's friend both on the set and off. The "Buckwheat" and "Porky" characters both became known for their collective garbled dialogue, in particular their catchphrase, "O-tay!" originally uttered by Porky, but soon used by both characters.

Thomas remained in Our Gang when the series changed production from Hal Roach Studios to Metro-Goldwyn-Mayer in 1938. Thomas was the only cast member to appear in all 52 of the MGM-produced entries and was the only holdover from the Hal Roach era to remain in the series until its end in 1944. By 1940, Thomas had grown out of his speech impairment, and with Lee having been replaced by Robert Blake, Thomas's Buckwheat character was written as an archetypal black youth. He was twelve years old when the final Our Gang film, Dancing Romeo, was completed in November 1943.

The character of Buckwheat in later years became synonymous with the derogatory "pickaninny" stereotype. However, the work of Thomas and the other black cast members as actors is credited with helping the cause of race relations by playing alongside white children and going to school with them as equals in a desegregated show during the height of the Jim Crow Era. According to Julia Lee, author of Our Gang: A Racial History of The Little Rascals, Thomas and the others were "considered saviors in many ways" by the black community as the most popular black stars in the United States during the 1920s and 1930s. Later, during the 1950s and 1960s, the NAACP fought against the tired and demeaning racial stereotypes found in some of the Our Gang shorts and moved to have the Little Rascals syndication package taken off the air, settling instead for distributor King World Productions editing the shorts under the NAACP's supervision.

== Later life ==
Thomas enlisted in the U.S. Army in 1954 at the age of 23, and was released from active military service in 1956 decorated with a National Defense Service Medal and a Good Conduct Medal.

After returning to civilian life, Thomas faced a dilemma shared by many of his co-stars from Our Gang. Though offered many film and stage roles, he had no desire to return to Hollywood as an actor: “After the Army, I wasn't really interested in the hassle of performing," he explained shortly before his death in 1980. "Even the big stars had to chase around and audition; it seemed like a rat race to me, with no security."

However, Thomas still enjoyed the film industry at large, and learned the trade of film editing and cutting. He had a successful decades-long career as a film lab technician with the Technicolor corporation, processing negative film reels for motion pictures such as Jaws, and for Metrocolor, processing Logan's Run.

Thomas was honored at "Hollywood 80", the second annual meeting of The Sons of the Desert, from July 30 to August 3, 1980. More than 500 Laurel and Hardy fans gathered at the Los Angeles Hilton Hotel. Several days were spent touring famous Hollywood attractions, and then the highlight of the gathering took place in the hotel ballroom. Among those honored on July 31 were Our Gang performers George McFarland, Dorothy DeBorba, Tommy Bond, and Joe Cobb. When Thomas was brought out, he received a spontaneous standing ovation, and was moved to tears.

== Death ==
On October 10, 1980, ten weeks after his July 31 appearance at the Hilton, Thomas died of a heart attack in his Los Angeles home at the age of 49. Thomas is buried at Inglewood Park Cemetery in Inglewood, where his grave plaque mistakenly says that he served during World War II.

== Legacy ==
In 1950, Billie had a son whom he also named William Thomas Jr.

William Thomas Jr. the younger went on to graduate from California State Northridge University in 1975, then in 1992, created the Buckwheat Memorial Scholarship for students at Northridge in his honor. In 2010, he wrote the book "Otay!" The Billy "Buckwheat" Thomas Story. On November 30, 2012, he died at the age of 62.

== Controversies ==
Eddie Murphy performed a series of Buckwheat sketches on Saturday Night Live during the 1980s when he was a cast member, but Thomas's co-star George McFarland, who played "Spanky" in Little Rascals, made it clear that he hated Murphy's imitations: "I didn't care for them a bit. Mr. Murphy did a very poor imitation. He made Buckwheat into a stereotype that he wasn't, at the expense of the people in his family who are still alive."

In 1990, the ABC newsmagazine 20/20 aired a segment featuring a man named Bill English, then a grocery bagger in Arizona, who claimed to be the adult Buckwheat. English's appearance prompted public objections from McFarland, who contacted media outlets following the broadcast to inform them that Thomas – the true Buckwheat – had been dead for ten years. Despite being confronted by McFarland on the television newsmagazine A Current Affair, English, who died four years later at the age of 60, refused to retreat from his claim, maintaining that he had originated the role of Buckwheat, with other actors playing the character only after he had left it. The next week, 20/20 acknowledged on-air that English's claim had been false, and apologized for the interview. The fallout from this incident included the resignation of a 20/20 producer and a negligence lawsuit filed by the son of William Thomas.

In July 2023, radio host Delk Kennedy of WKOM in Tennessee referred to White House press secretary Karine Jean-Pierre as "Buckwheat"; when some listeners criticized Kennedy's remarks he responded by saying the Buckwheat character was intelligent and his comment was a compliment.
