= Heebee Jeebees =

1927 film

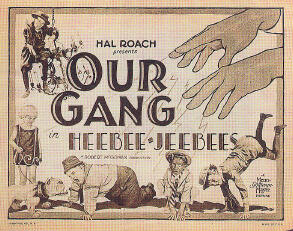
- Lobby card
- Directed by: Robert F. McGowan; Anthony Mack
- Written by: H. M. Walker
- Produced by: Robert F. McGowan; Hal Roach
- Cinematography: Art Lloyd
- Edited by: Richard C. Currier
- Distributed by: MGM
- Release date: November 19, 1927
- Running time: 20 minutes
- Country: United States
- Language: Silent with English intertitles

Heebee Jeebees is a 1927 Our Gang short silent comedy film, the 67th in the series, directed by Robert F. McGowan and Anthony Mack. It is considered lost, as it was destroyed in the 1965 MGM vault fire.

== Cast ==
=== The Gang ===
- Joe Cobb as Joe
- Jackie Condon as Jackie
- Jean Darling as Jean
- Allen Hoskins as Farina
- Bobby Hutchins as Wheezer
- Jay R. Smith as Jay
- Harry Spear as Harry
- Pete the Pup as Pansy

=== Additional cast ===
- Mildred Kornman as Party guest
- Richard and Robert Smith as Twins at party
- Charles A. Bachman as Officer
- George B. French as Prof. Electra
- Lyle Tayo as Joe's mother
- Dorothy Vernon as Wheezer's mother

== See also ==
- Our Gang filmography
