= Shivering Spooks =

1926 short film by Robert F. McGowan

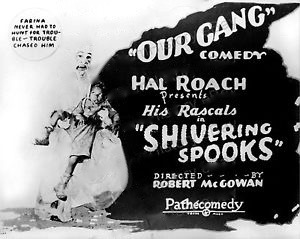
- Lobby card
- Directed by: Robert F. McGowan
- Written by: Hal Roach; H. M. Walker
- Produced by: Hal Roach; F. Richard Jones
- Starring: Joe Cobb; Jackie Condon; Johnny Downs; Allen Hoskins; Mary Kornman; Scooter Lowry; Jay R. Smith; Bobby Young; Buster the Dog; George B. French; Clara Guiol; Tiny Sandford
- Edited by: Richard C. Currier
- Distributed by: Pathé Exchange
- Release date: August 8, 1926
- Running time: 18:07
- Country: United States
- Language: Silent (English intertitles)

Shivering Spooks is a 1926 short silent comedy film, the 52nd in the Our Gang series, directed by Robert F. McGowan. Child actor Johnny Downs later became a successful character actor and starred with George Zucco in The Mad Monster (1942).

== Plot ==
A phony spiritualist named Professor Fleece dupes gullible people into believing that he can contact the dead through séances. When the kids disrupt a séance, the professor orders his henchmen to scare them from the area.

== Cast ==
=== The Gang ===
- Joe Cobb as Joe
- Jackie Condon as Jackie
- Johnny Downs as Johnny
- Allen Hoskins as Farina
- Mary Kornman as Mary
- Scooter Lowry as Skooter
- Jay R. Smith as Jay
- Bobby Young as Bonedust
- Buster the Dog as Buster

=== Additional cast ===
- Harry Bowen as Assistant to Professor Fleece
- George B. French as Professor Fleece
- Clara Guiol as 'Sucker' at séance
- Ham Kinsey as Assistant to Professor Fleece
- Tiny Sandford as Detective
- Dorothea Wolbert as 'Sucker' at séance

== See also ==
- Our Gang filmography
