= The Fourth Alarm (film) =

1926 film directed by Robert F. McGowan

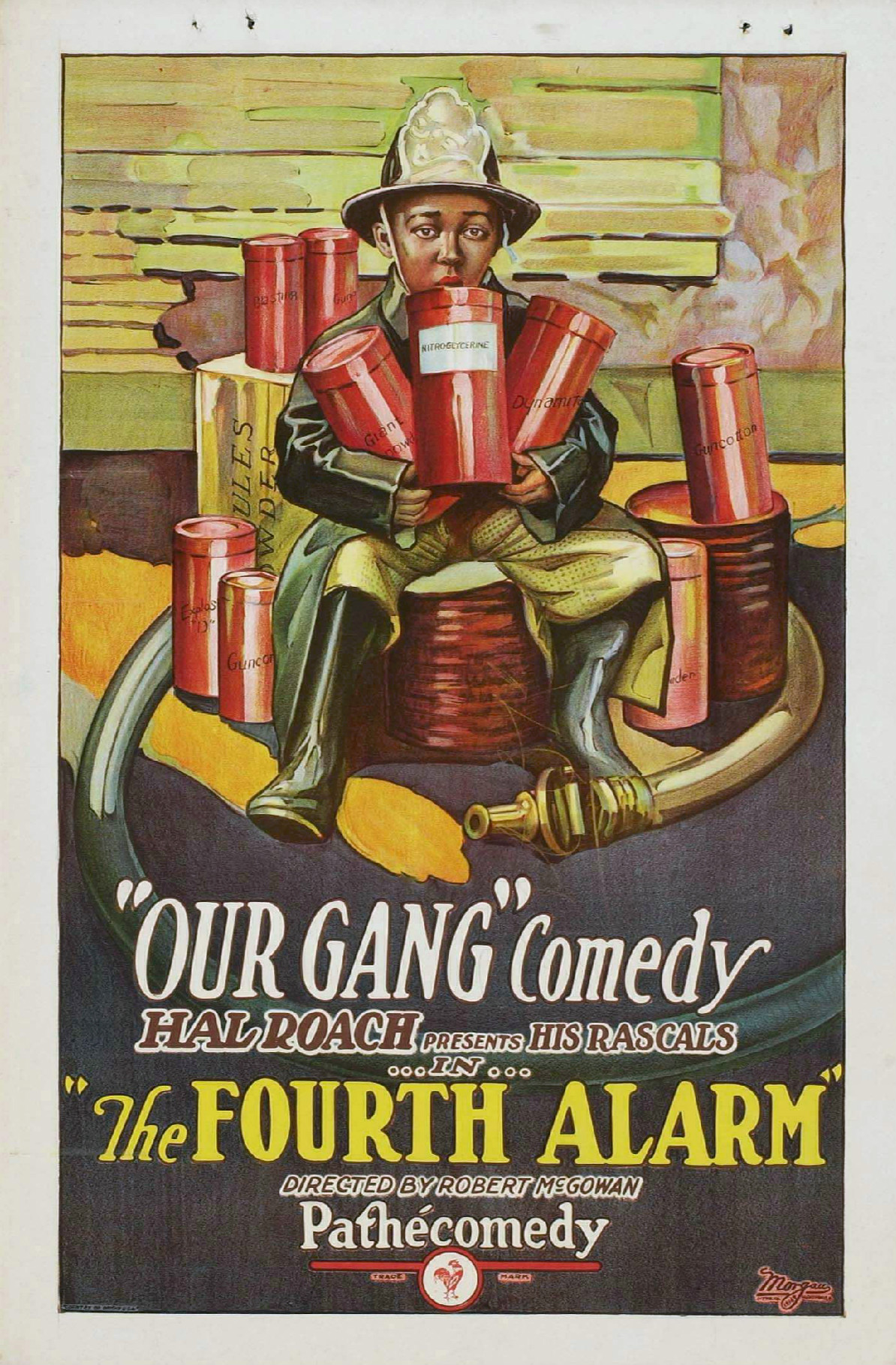
- Film poster
- Directed by: Robert F. McGowan
- Written by: Hal Roach; H. M. Walker; Robert A. McGowan
- Produced by: Hal Roach; F. Richard Jones
- Edited by: Richard C. Currier
- Distributed by: Pathé Exchange
- Release date: September 12, 1926
- Running time: 20 minutes
- Country: United States
- Language: Silent (English intertitles)

The Fourth Alarm is a 1926 short silent comedy film, the 53rd in the Our Gang series, directed by Robert F. McGowan. It was later reworked in Hook and Ladder in 1932.

== Plot ==
The gang establish a junior fire department by repurposing an old barn into a firehouse. However, when they are called to a real fire, they encounter challenges, and Farina struggles to manage the high pressure of the fire hose.

== Cast ==
=== The Gang ===
- Joe Cobb as Joe
- Jackie Condon as Jackie
- Johnny Downs as Johnny
- Allen Hoskins as Farina
- Jannie Hoskins as Mango
- Mary Kornman as Mary
- Mildred Kornman as Mildred
- Elmer Lowry as Skooter
- Jay R. Smith as Turkie-egg
- Bobby Young as Bonedust
- Billy Naylor as Our Gang member
- Pal the Dog as himself
- Buster the Dog as himself
- Dinah the Mule as Humidor

=== Additional cast ===
- Charles A. Bachman as Officer
- Ed Brandenburg as Fireman
- George B. French as Chemis
- Ham Kinsey as Fireman
- Sam Lufkin as Crowd extra
- Gene Morgan as Fireman

== Production ==
The film marks Mary Kornman's final Our Gang appearance as a child. She later appeared in several episodes as an adult.

== See also ==
- Our Gang filmography
