= War Feathers =

1926 film

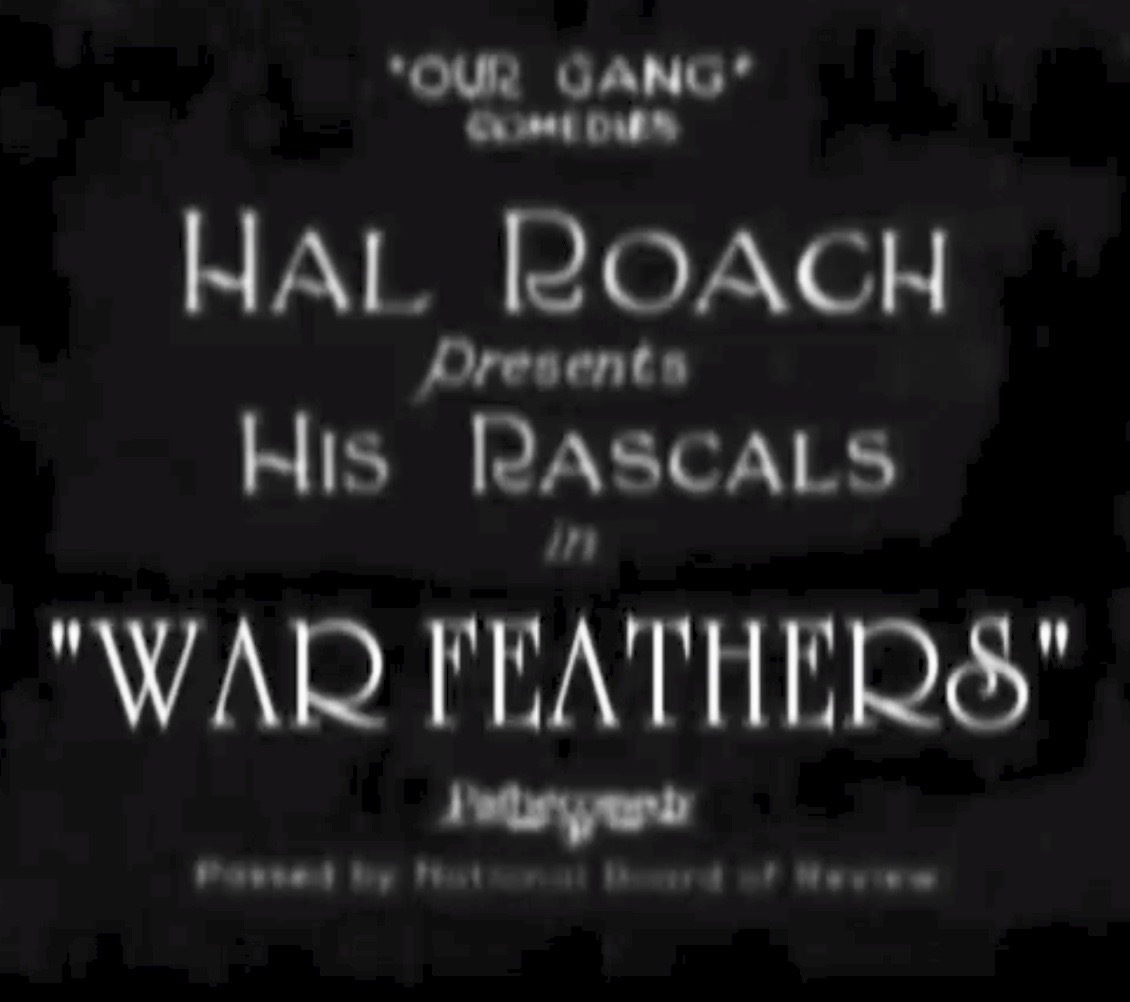
- Intertitle
- Directed by: Robert F. McGowan; Anthony Mack
- Written by: Hal Roach; H. M. Walker
- Produced by: Hal Roach; F. Richard Jones
- Starring: Joe Cobb; Jackie Condon; Johnny Downs; Allen Hoskins; Jannie Hoskins; Mildred Kornman; Scooter Lowry; Jay R. Smith; Bobby Young; Peggy Ahern
- Edited by: Richard C. Currier
- Distributed by: Pathé Exchange
- Release date: November 21, 1926
- Running time: 20 minutes
- Country: United States
- Language: Silent (English intertitles)

War Feathers is a 1926 American short silent comedy film, the 54th in the Our Gang series, directed by Robert F. McGowan and his nephew Anthony Mack.

== Cast ==
- Joe Cobb as Joe
- Jackie Condon as Jackie
- Johnny Downs as Johnny
- Allen Hoskins as Farina
- Jannie Hoskins as Mango
- Mildred Kornman as Mildred
- Scooter Lowry as Skooter
- Jay R. Smith as Jay
- Bobby Young as Bonedust
- Peggy Ahern as Peggy

=== Additional cast ===
- Chet Brandenburg as Rancher at the Whistling Clam
- Allan Cavan as Train passenger
- George B. French as Rancher at the Whistling Clam
- Ham Kinsey as Conductor
- Sam Lufkin as Sheriff
- Dinah the Mule as herself

== See also ==
- Our Gang filmography
