= Uncle Tom's Uncle =

1926 film

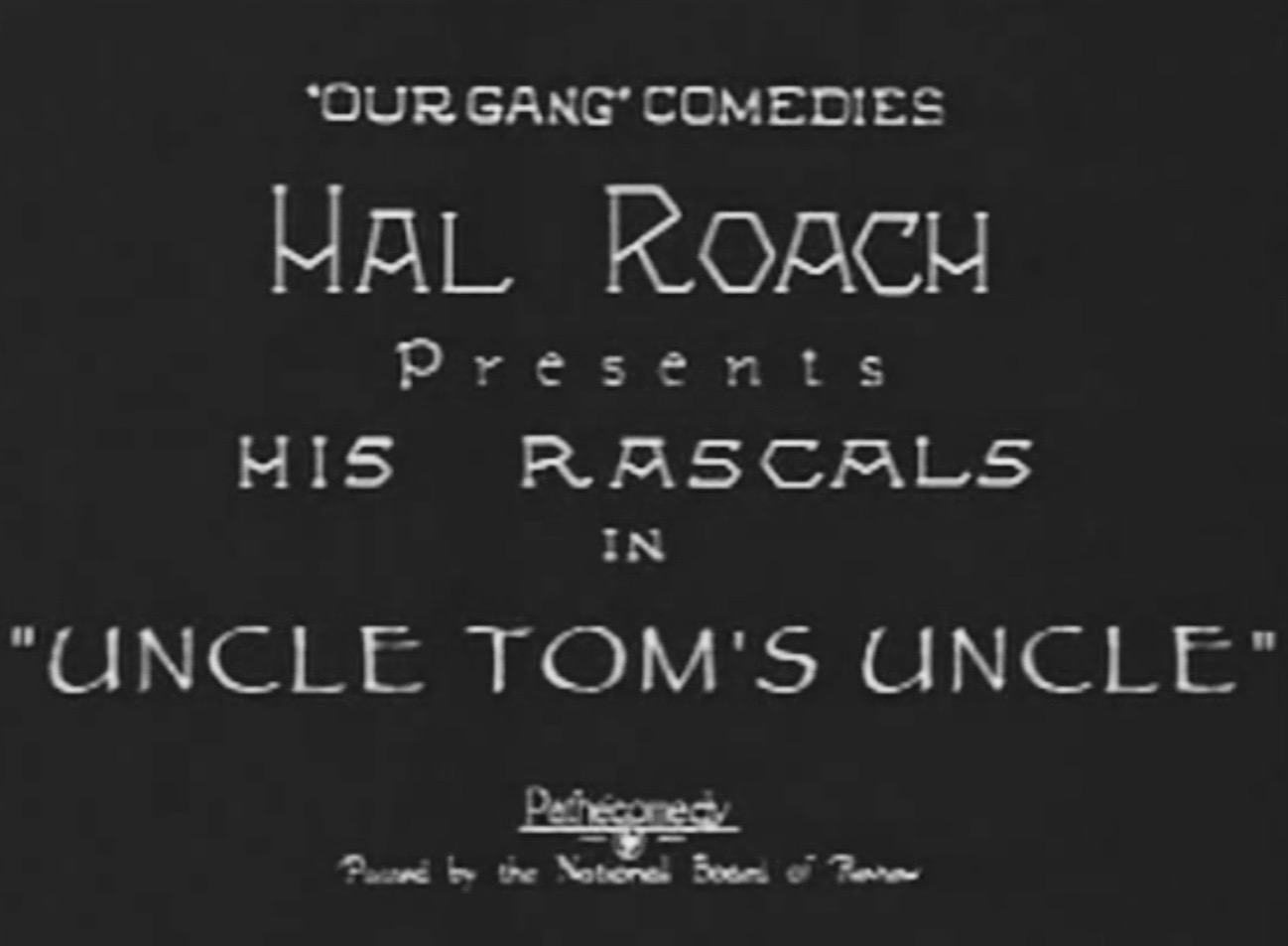
- Intertitle
- Directed by: Robert F. McGowan
- Produced by: Hal Roach; F. Richard Jones
- Starring: Joe Cobb; Jackie Condon; Mickey Daniels; Johnny Downs; Allen Hoskins; Mary Kornman; Jay R. Smith; Bobby Young; Jannie Hoskins; Nancy McKee; David Durand; Peggy Eames; Gabe Saienz; Pal the Dog; Buster the Dog
- Edited by: Richard C. Currier
- Distributed by: Pathé Exchange
- Release date: May 30, 1926
- Running time: 20 minutes
- Country: United States
- Languages: Silent; English intertitles

Uncle Tom's Uncle is a 1926 American short silent comedy film, the 50th in the Our Gang series, directed by Robert F. McGowan.

== Cast ==
=== The Gang ===
- Joe Cobb as Joe / Uncle Tom
- Jackie Condon as Jackie
- Mickey Daniels as Mickey / Simon Legree
- Johnny Downs as Johnny / Marks the Lawyer
- Allen Hoskins as Farina / Topsy
- Mary Kornman as Mary / Little Eva
- Bobby Young as Bonedust
- Jay R. Smith as Jay
- Jannie Hoskins as Mango
- Nancy McKee as Nancy
- David Durand as Piano player
- Pal the Dog as Pal
- Buster the Dog as Buster

=== Additional cast ===
- Peggy Eames as Audience member laughing
- Gabe Saienz as Tough kid in the audience
- Bobby Green as Audience member
- Jackie Hanes as Audience member
- Billy Naylor as Audience member

== See also ==
- Our Gang filmography
