= Telling Whoppers =

1926 film

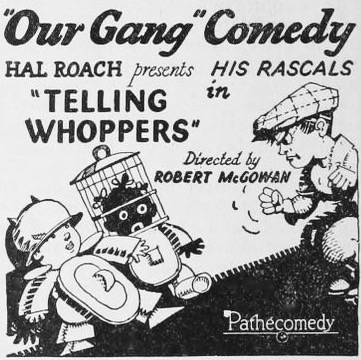
- Cornerblock ad featured in The Film Daily
- Directed by: Robert F. McGowan; Anthony Mack
- Written by: Hal Roach; H. M. Walker
- Produced by: Hal Roach; F. Richard Jones
- Starring: Joe Cobb; Jackie Condon; Allen Hoskins; Scooter Lowry; Jay R. Smith; Bobby Young; Billy Naylor; Johnny Downs; Peggy Eames; Charles McAvoy; Gene Morgan; Dorothy Vernon; S. D. Wilcox; Charley Young; Diamond the Dog; Pal the Dog
- Edited by: Richard C. Currier
- Distributed by: Pathé Exchange
- Release date: December 19, 1926
- Running time: 20 minutes
- Country: United States
- Languages: Silent; English intertitles

Telling Whoppers is a 1926 short silent comedy film, the 55th in the Our Gang series, directed by Robert F. McGowan and nephew Anthony Mack. It was the 55th Our Gang short subject to be released.

== Plot ==
Neighborhood bully Tuffy is determined to pummel every boy in the neighborhood. Joe and Farina wear bandages, pretending to be too injured to fight, but Tuffy beats them anyway. Joe and Farina encourage the boys to band together and they chase Tuffy away. The gang retires to their hideout and draw lots to decide who should fight Tuffy. Joe and Farina draw the unlucky task of hunting for Tully, but Peggy tells them that Tuffy has moved to Chicago. Joe and Farina return and lie that they attacked Tuffy and threw him in the lake.

== Cast ==
=== The Gang ===
- Joe Cobb as Joe
- Jackie Condon as Jackie
- Allen Hoskins as Farina
- Scooter Lowry as Skooter
- Jay R. Smith as Jay R.
- Bobby Young as Bonedust
- Billy Naylor as Billy

=== Additional cast ===
- Johnny Downs as Tuffy Thompson
- Peggy Eames as Peggy
- Charles McAvoy as Officer
- Gene Morgan as Officer
- Dorothy Vernon as Tuffy's mother
- S. D. Wilcox as Officer
- Charley Young as man near swimming hole
- Diamond the Dog as himself
- Pal the Dog as himself

== See also ==
- Our Gang filmography
