= Bring Home the Turkey =

1927 film

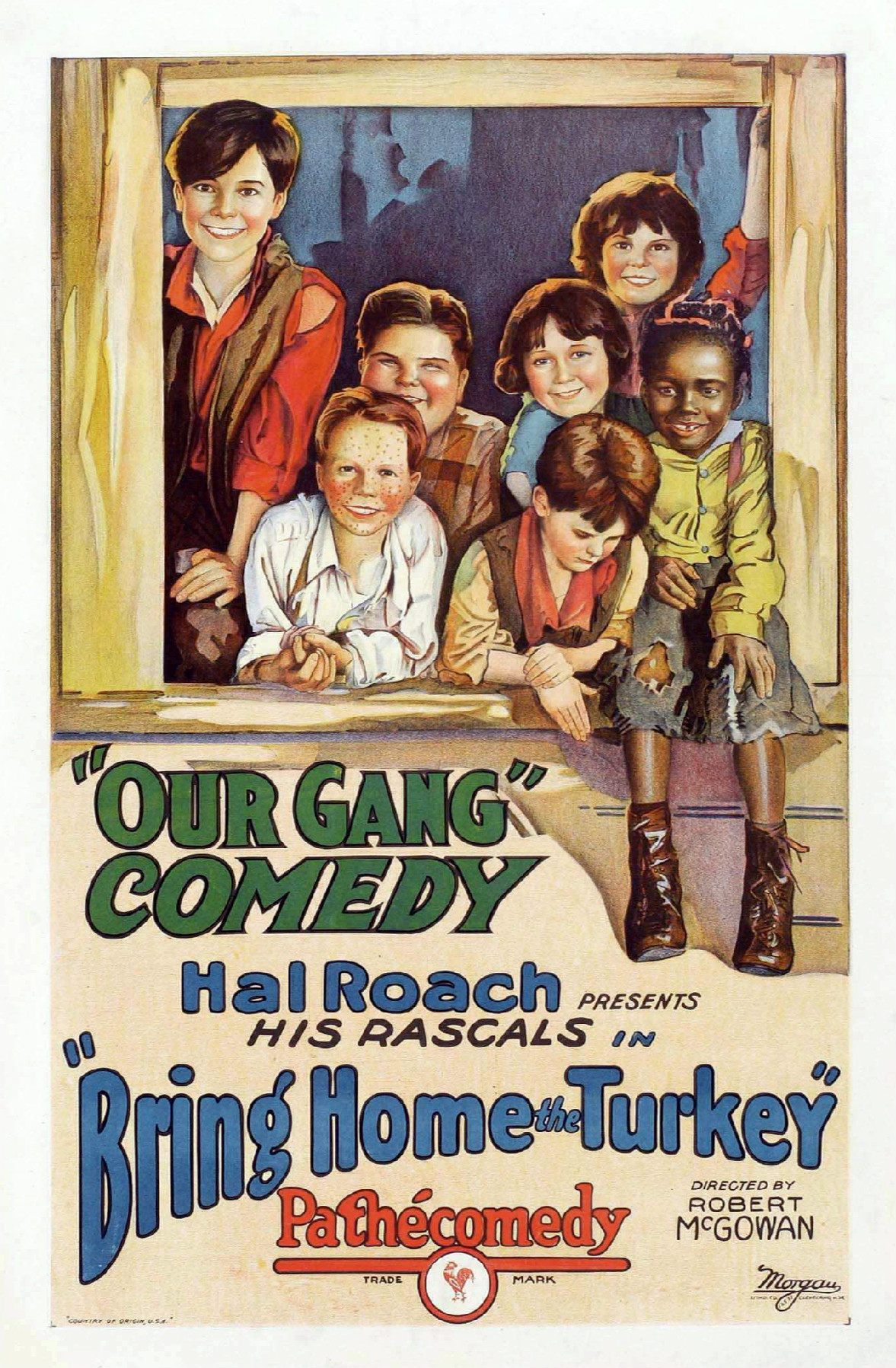
- Poster
- Directed by: Robert F. McGowan; Anthony Mack
- Written by: Hal Roach; H. M. Walker
- Produced by: Hal Roach; F. Richard Jones
- Edited by: Richard C. Currier
- Distributed by: Pathé Exchange
- Release date: January 16, 1927
- Running time: 20 minutes
- Country: United States
- Language: Silent (English intertitles)

Bring Home the Turkey is a 1927 American short silent comedy film, the 56th in the Our Gang series, directed by Robert F. McGowan and Anthony Mack.

== Cast ==
=== The Gang ===
- Joe Cobb as Joe
- Jackie Condon as Jackie
- Jean Darling as Jean
- Johnny Downs as Johnny
- Allen Hoskins as Farina
- Jannie Hoskins as Mango
- Mildred Kornman as Mildred
- Scooter Lowry as Skooter
- Jay R. Smith as Jay
- Peggy Eames as Peggy

=== Additional cast ===
- Tom Wilson as Uncle Tom
- Louise Emmons as Headmistress
- Lyle Tayo as Judge's servant
- Charley Young as Orphanage official
- Noah Young as The detective
- Dinah the Mule as Herself

== See also ==
- Our Gang filmography
