= Fair and Muddy =

1928 film

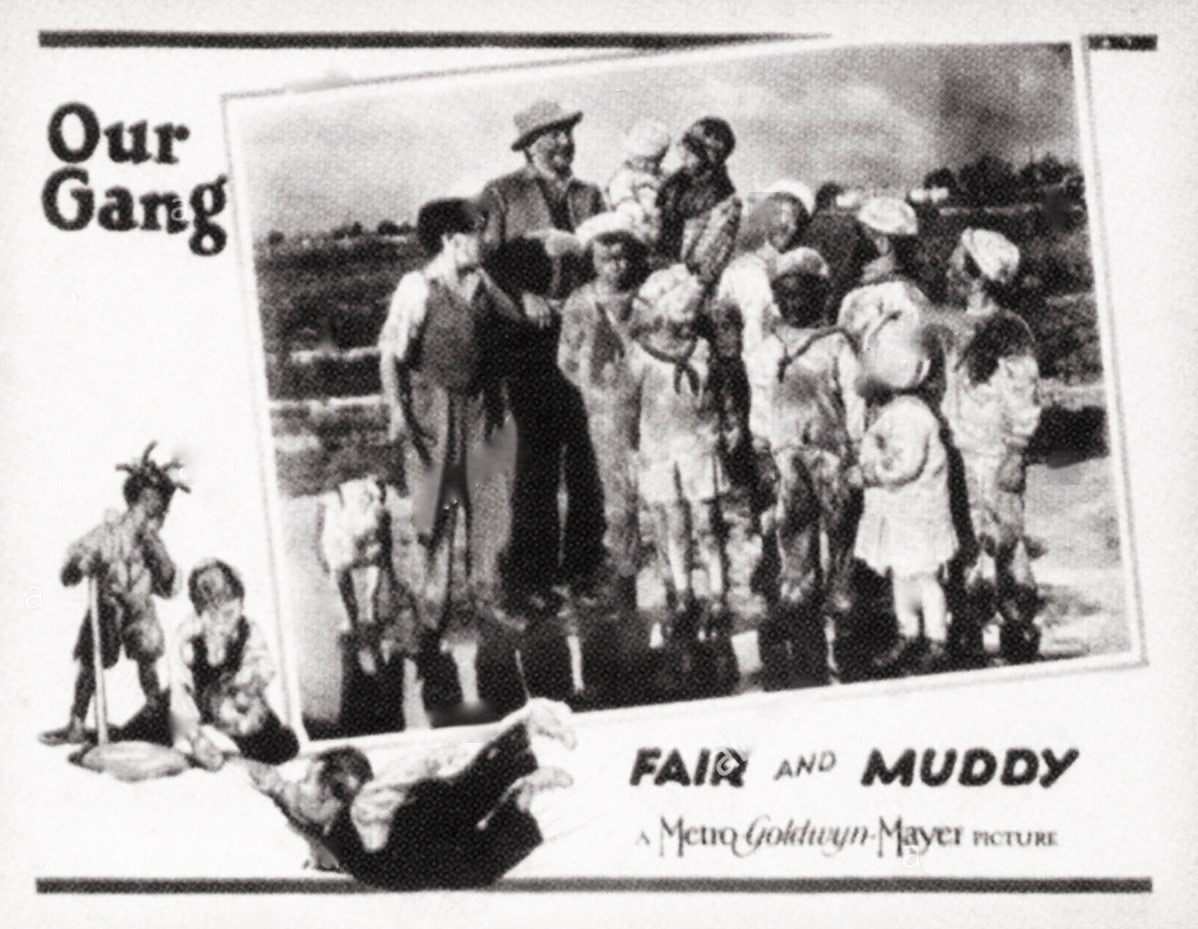
- Lobby card
- Directed by: Charley Oelze
- Written by: H. M. Walker
- Produced by: Robert F. McGowan; Hal Roach
- Starring: Joe Cobb; Jackie Condon; Jean Darling; Allen Hoskins; Bobby Hutchins; Mildred Kornman; Jay R. Smith; Harry Spear; Johnny Aber; Bobby Dean; Donnie Smith; Bobby Young; Pete the Pup; Lillianne Leighton; Alfred Fisher; Florence Lee; Charles King
- Cinematography: Art Lloyd
- Edited by: Richard C. Currier
- Distributed by: Metro-Goldwyn-Mayer
- Release date: May 5, 1928
- Running time: 20 minutes
- Country: United States
- Languages: Silent; English intertitles

Fair and Muddy is a 1928 Our Gang short silent comedy film, the 75th in the series, directed by Charley Oelze. It had been considered lost until a print of the film was discovered in Europe in 2008.

== Plot ==
The gang live at the Gramercy Orphanage, operated by Grandpa and Grandma Evans. Next door to the orphanage lives Amanda Schultz, a child-hating spinster who has a drawer full of confiscated baseballs that she has taken from the kids. However, Amanda is nicer to the gang after she receives a telegram stating that she must acquire a child of her own in order to inherit a bequest from a rich uncle.

Grandpa Evans is suspicious of Amanda's actions and tells the kids to make life miserable for her. The gang stick Amanda with pins, attack her chauffeur with a pea shooter and set her friend ablaze. Then a rival gang arrives and a mud battle ensues. Amanda joins the mud bath and wins it for the gang. The experience softens her as she realizes that the gang made her feel like a child again.

== Cast ==
=== The Gang ===
- Joe Cobb as Joe
- Jackie Condon as Jackie
- Jean Darling as Jean
- Allen Hoskins as Farina
- Bobby Hutchins as Wheezer
- Mildred Kornman as Mildred
- Jay R. Smith as Jay
- Harry Spear as Harry
- Pete the Pup as Pansy

=== Additional cast ===
- Johnny Aber as Kid at orphanage
- Bobby Dean as Fat kid at the orphanage
- Donnie Smith as Kid at orphanage
- Bobby Young as Rival gang member
- Edgar Dearing as Motorcycle cop
- Alfred Fisher as Grandpa Evans
- Charles King as Chauffeur
- Florence Lee as Grandma Evans
- Lillianne Leighton as Mrs. Amanda Schultz
- Sam Lufkin as Man laughing
- Patsy O'Byrne as Character part unknown
- Carolina "Spike" Rankin as Alvira
- Charley Young as Man checking tire

== See also ==
- Our Gang filmography
