= Rainy Days (film) =

1928 film

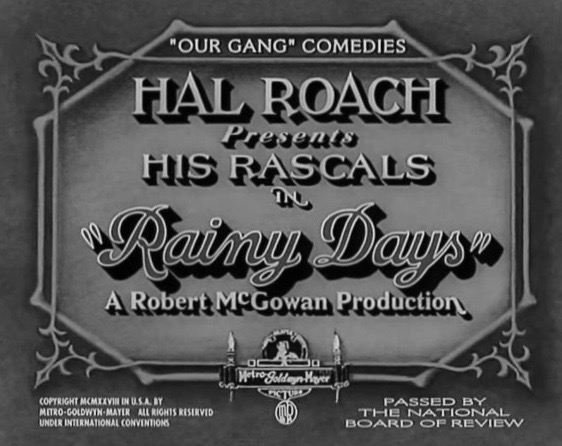
- Title card
- Directed by: Anthony Mack
- Written by: Reed Heustis; Anthony Mack
- Produced by: Hal Roach
- Starring: Joe Cobb; Jackie Condon; Jean Darling; Allen Hoskins; Bobby Hutchins; Mildred Kornman; Jay R. Smith; Harry Spear; Bobby Dean; Pete the Pup; Lyle Tayo
- Cinematography: Art Lloyd
- Edited by: Richard C. Currier
- Distributed by: Metro-Goldwyn-Mayer
- Release date: February 11, 1928
- Running time: 25 minutes
- Country: United States
- Languages: Silent; English intertitles

Rainy Days is a 1928 Our Gang short silent comedy film, the 71st in the series, directed by Anthony Mack.

== Cast ==
=== The Gang ===
- Joe Cobb as Joe
- Jackie Condon as Jackie
- Jean Darling as Jean
- Allen Hoskins as Farina
- Bobby Hutchins as Wheezer
- Mildred Kornman as Mildred
- Jay R. Smith as Jay
- Harry Spear as Harry
- Bobby Dean as Other fat kid
- Pete the Pup as himself

=== Additional cast ===
- Lyle Tayo as Mom
- Charles A. Bachman as Undetermined role

== See also ==
- Our Gang filmography
