= Ten Years Old =

1927 film

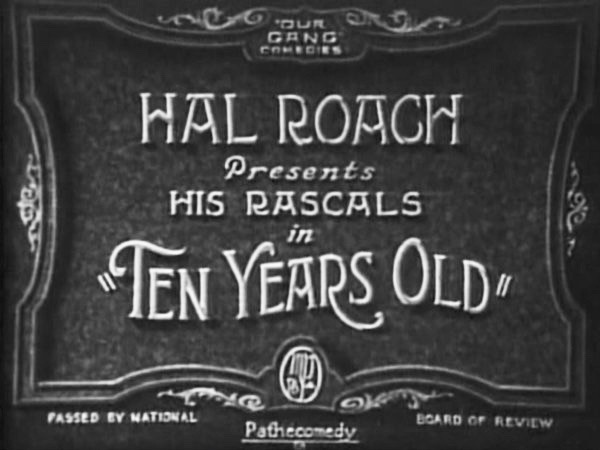
- Title card
- Directed by: Anthony Mack
- Written by: Hal Roach; H. M. Walker
- Produced by: Hal Roach; F. Richard Jones
- Starring: Joe Cobb; Jackie Condon; Allen Hoskins; Jannie Hoskins; Scooter Lowry; Jay R. Smith; Bobby Young; Jean Darling; Mildred Kornman; Johnny Aber; Bret Black; Jimsy Boudwin; Andy Shuford; Pal the Dog; Buster the Dog; Lyle Tayo
- Edited by: Richard C. Currier
- Distributed by: Pathé Exchange
- Release date: March 13, 1927
- Running time: 20 minutes
- Country: United States
- Language: Silent (English intertitles)

Ten Years Old is a 1927 American short silent comedy film, the 58th in the Our Gang series, directed by Anthony Mack. It was remade as Birthday Blues in 1932.

== Plot ==
Joe Cobb invited the gang to his 10th birthday party, but they are all at Jackie's party. So the parties were merged and Joe was able to share a cake he baked, not realizing Mildred added tacks, and a rubber tube to the batter.

== Cast ==
=== The Gang ===
- Joe Cobb as Joe
- Jackie Condon as Jackie
- Allen Hoskins as Farina
- Jannie Hoskins as Mango
- Scooter Lowry as Skooter
- Jay R. Smith as Jay-R.
- Bobby Young as Bone Dust
- Mildred Kornman as Mildred
- Johnny Aber as Our Gang member
- Bret Black as Our Gang member
- Jimsy Boudwin as Our Gang member
- Andy Shuford as Our Gang member
- Pal the Dog as himself
- Buster the Dog as himself

=== Additional cast ===
- Carl Busch as Rich kid
- Jean Darling as Rich kid
- Bobby Mallon as Rich kid
- Doris Oelze as Rich kid
- George B. French as Jackie's father
- F. F. Guenste as Butler
- Fay Holderness as Jackie's maid
- Lyle Tayo as Joe's mother
- Peggy Eames as Undetermined role

== See also ==
- Our Gang filmography
