= Playin' Hookey =

1928 film

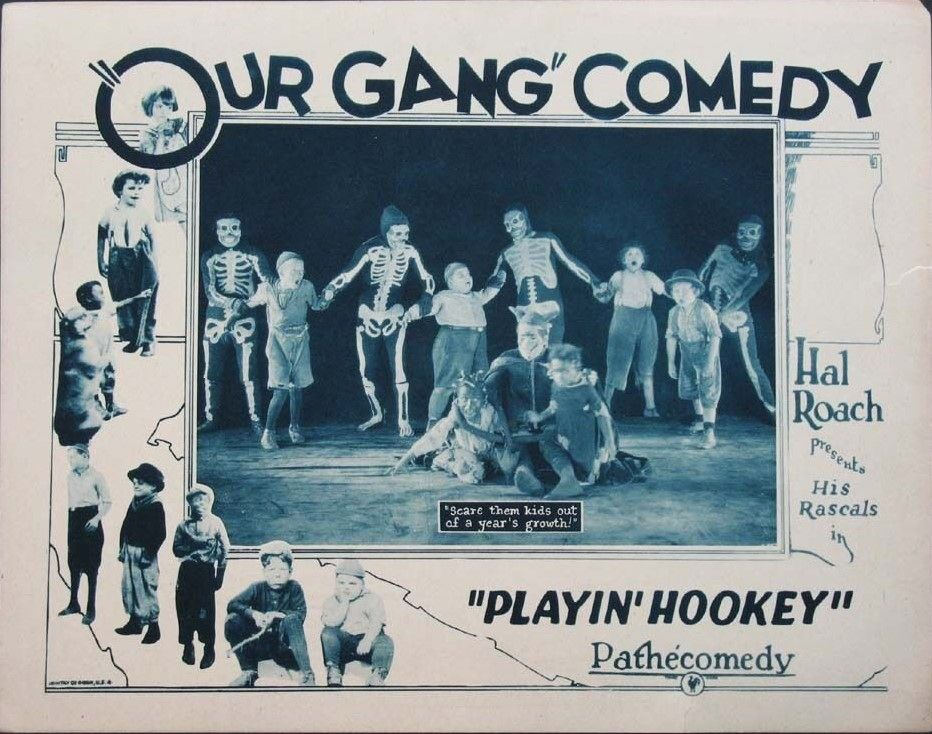
- Directed by: Anthony Mack
- Written by: H. M. Walker
- Produced by: Hal Roach
- Starring: Joe Cobb; Jackie Condon; Allen Hoskins; Jannie Hoskins; Jay R. Smith; Harry Spear; Jean Darling; Bobby Hutchins; Mildred Kornman; Pete the Pup; Charlie Hall; Jack Hill
- Edited by: Richard C. Currier
- Distributed by: Pathé Exchange
- Release date: January 1, 1928
- Running time: 20 minutes
- Country: United States
- Languages: Silent; English intertitles

Playin' Hookey is a 1928 American short silent comedy film, the 69th in the series, directed by Anthony Mack.

== Cast ==
=== The Gang ===
- Joe Cobb as Joe
- Jackie Condon as Jackie
- Allen Hoskins as Farina
- Jannie Hoskins as Zuccini
- Jay R. Smith as Jay
- Harry Spear as Harry
- Pete the Pup as Pansy

=== Additional cast ===
- Jean Darling as Jean, Joe's sister
- Bobby Hutchins as Wheezer, Joe's brother
- Mildred Kornman as Baby
- Chet Brandenburg as Keystone-ish cop
- Ed Brandenburg as Keystone-ish cop
- Cameron Chase as Artie-Fro
- Edgar Dearing as Herr Dun der Blitzen
- Budd Fine as Joe's father
- William Gillespie as Moving picture star
- Charlie Hall as Moving picture star dressed as Chaplin
- Jack Hill as Keystone-ish cop
- Sam Lufkin as Keystone-ish cop
- Arthur Millett as Keystone-ish cop
- Lincoln Plumer as Movie-maker
- Tiny Sandford as Mike, studio guard
- Lyle Tayo as Joe's mother
- Dorothy Coburn as Woman hit with pie

== See also ==
- Our Gang filmography
