= The Smile Wins =

1928 film

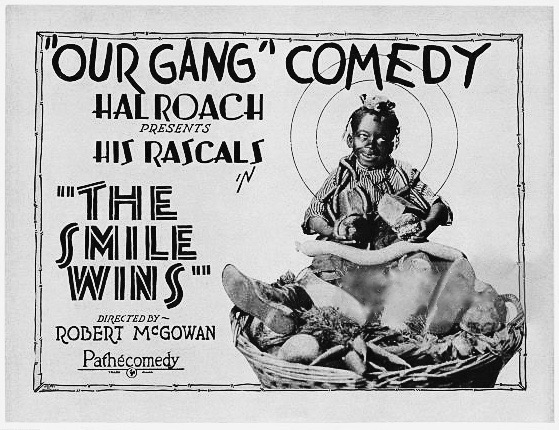
- Lobby card
- Directed by: Robert F. McGowan
- Written by: Hal Roach; H. M. Walker; Anthony Mack
- Produced by: Hal Roach
- Edited by: Richard C. Currier
- Production company: Hal Roach Studios
- Distributed by: Pathé Exchange
- Release date: February 26, 1928
- Running time: 20 minutes
- Country: United States
- Languages: Silent; English intertitles

The Smile Wins is a 1928 American short silent comedy film, the 72nd in the series, directed by Robert F. McGowan. It is the final Our Gang short released through Pathé Exchange.

== Cast ==
=== The Gang ===
- Allen Hoskins as Farina
- Jannie Hoskins as Mango
- Joe Cobb as Joe
- Jackie Condon as Jackie
- Jay R. Smith as Jay
- Harry Spear as Harry
- Pete the Pup as himself

=== Additional cast ===
- Johnny Aber as Kid throwing tomato
- Mildred Kornman as Toddler on the gang's merry-go-round
- George B. French as Simon Sleazy
- Florence Hoskins as Farina's mother
- Jean Darling as Undetermined role
- Bobby Hutchins as Undetermined role
- Budd Fine as Undetermined role
- Lyle Tayo as Undetermined role

== See also ==
- Our Gang filmography
