= Love My Dog =

1927 film

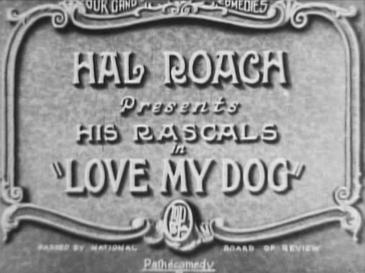
- Title card
- Directed by: Robert F. McGowan
- Written by: Hal Roach; H. M. Walker
- Produced by: Hal Roach
- Starring: Joe Cobb; Jackie Condon; Allen Hoskins; Scooter Lowry; Jay R. Smith; Bobby Young; Mildred Kornman; Bobby Mallon; Dick Gilbert; Tiny Sandford
- Edited by: Richard C. Currier
- Distributed by: Pathé Exchange
- Release date: April 17, 1927
- Running time: 20 minutes
- Country: United States
- Languages: Silent; English intertitles

Love My Dog is a 1927 American short silent comedy film, the 59th in the Our Gang series, directed by Robert F. McGowan. It was remade in 1932 as The Pooch.

== Plot ==
After Farina and Joe's dog Oleander is taken to the pound, the kids must raise enough money to rescue him.

== Cast ==
=== The Gang ===
- Joe Cobb - Joe
- Jackie Condon - Jackie
- Allen Hoskins - Farina
- Scooter Lowry - Skooter
- Jay R. Smith - Jay
- Bobby Young - Bonedust

=== Additional cast ===
- Mildred Kornman - Baby on the ledge
- Bobby Mallon - Kid warning the gang
- Andy Shuford as Kid at dog show
- Dick Gilbert - Attendant at gas station
- Charles McMurphy - Dog catcher
- Tiny Sandford - P. Fulton, attorney at law
- Charley Young - Office worker

== See also ==
- Our Gang filmography
