= Edison, Marconi & Co. =

1928 film

- Directed by: Anthony Mack
- Written by: H. M. Walker
- Produced by: Hal Roach
- Cinematography: Art Lloyd
- Edited by: Richard C. Currier
- Distributed by: Metro-Goldwyn-Mayer
- Release date: March 9, 1928
- Running time: 20 minutes
- Country: United States
- Language: Silent with English intertitles

Edison, Marconi & Co. is a 1928 Our Gang short silent comedy film, the 73rd in the series, directed by Anthony Mack. It is considered lost, as it was destroyed in the 1965 MGM vault fire.

== Cast ==
=== The Gang ===
- Joe Cobb as Joe
- Jackie Condon as Jackie
- Allen Hoskins as Farina
- Bobby Hutchins as Wheezer
- Jay R. Smith as Jay, a.k.a. J. Edison Westinghouse Smith
- Harry Spear as Harry
- Pete the Pup as himself

=== Additional cast ===
- Jean Darling as Undermined role
- Mildred Kornman as Undetermined role

== See also ==
- List of American films of 1928
- Our Gang filmography
