= Chicken Feed =

1927 film

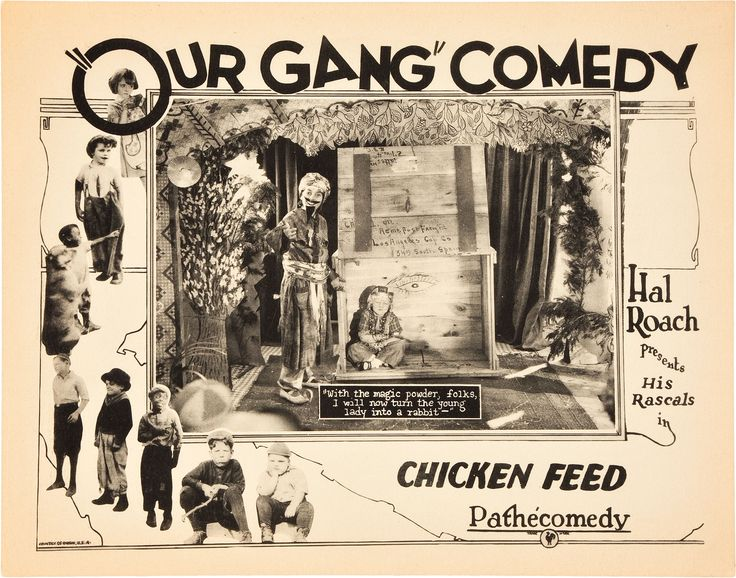
- Lobby card
- Directed by: Anthony Mack; Charles Oelze
- Written by: Hal Roach; H. M. Walker
- Produced by: Hal Roach
- Production company: Hal Roach Studios
- Distributed by: Pathé Exchange
- Release date: November 6, 1927
- Running time: 20 minutes
- Country: United States
- Language: Silent with English intertitles

Chicken Feed is a 1927 American short silent comedy film, the 65th in the Our Gang series, directed by Anthony Mack.

== Cast ==
=== The Gang ===
- Joe Cobb as Joe
- Jackie Condon as Jackie
- Allen Hoskins as Farina
- Jannie Hoskins as Mango
- Scooter Lowry as Skooter
- Jay R. Smith as Jay
- Bobby Young as Bonedust

=== Additional cast ===
- Jean Darling as Jean
- Johnny Downs as Prof. Presto Misterio (magician)
- Bobby Hutchins as Toddler chasing the monkey
- Harry Spear as Audience member
- Ham Kinsey as Animal trainer
- Jimsy Boudwin as Audience member
- Bobby Mallon as Audience member
- Davey Monahan as Audience member
- Andy Shuford as Audience member
- Pal the Dog as himself

== See also ==
- Our Gang filmography
