= Baby Brother =

1927 film

- Film poster
- Directed by: Anthony Mack; Charles Oelze
- Written by: Hal Roach; H. M. Walker
- Produced by: Hal Roach
- Starring: Joe Cobb; Jackie Condon; Jean Darling; Allen Hoskins; Bobby Hutchins; Jay R. Smith; Oliver Hardy; Symona Boniface; Lyle Tayo; Clifton Young
- Cinematography: Art Lloyd
- Edited by: Richard C. Currier
- Distributed by: Pathé Exchange
- Release date: June 26, 1927
- Running time: 28 minutes
- Country: United States
- Language: Silent with English intertitles

Baby Brother is a 1927 American Our Gang short film, the 61st in the series. It marks the first appearance of longtime member Bobby "Wheezer" Hutchins.

== Cast ==
=== The Gang ===
- Joe Cobb as Joe
- Jackie Condon as Jackie
- Jean Darling as Jean
- Allen "Farina" Hoskins as Farina
- Jannie Hoskins as Mango
- Scooter Lowry as Skooter
- Jay R. Smith as Jay
- Bobby Young as Bonedust
- Bobby "Wheezer" Hutchins as Horatio
- Mildred Kornman as Jackie's sister
- Davey Monahan as Our Gang member
- Pal the Dog as Himself
- Robert Smith as Tunney
- Richard Smith as Coolidge

=== Additional cast ===
- Symona Boniface as Party guest
- Ed Brandenburg as Officer
- Harry Earles as Gus, one of Barr's midgets
- Anita Garvin as Amorous nursemaid
- F. F. Guenste as Butler
- Ben Hall as Man with glasses
- Oliver Hardy as Nursemaid's boyfriend
- Eulalie Jensen as Joe's mother
- Lillianne Leighton as One of the mothers
- Lincoln Plumer as Joe's father
- Lyle Tayo as Party guest
- S. D. Wilcox as Officer

== See also ==
- Our Gang filmography
- Oliver Hardy filmography
