= Noisy Noises =

1929 film

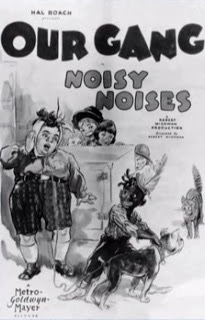
- Film poster
- Directed by: Robert F. McGowan
- Written by: Reed Heustis; Anthony Mack
- Produced by: Robert F. McGowan; Hal Roach
- Starring: Joe Cobb; Jean Darling; Allen Hoskins; Bobby Hutchins; Mary Ann Jackson; Jay R. Smith; Harry Spear; Warren Mills; George Dunning; Andy Shuford; Gordon Thorpe; Pete the Pup; Lyle Tayo
- Cinematography: Art Lloyd
- Edited by: Richard C. Currier
- Distributed by: Metro-Goldwyn-Mayer
- Release date: February 9, 1929
- Running time: 19:29
- Country: United States
- Languages: Silent; English intertitles

Noisy Noises is a 1929 Our Gang short silent comedy film, the 82nd in the series, directed by Robert F. McGowan.

== Cast ==
The film

=== The Gang ===
- Joe Cobb as Joe
- Jean Darling as Jean
- Allen Hoskins as Farina
- Bobby Hutchins as Wheezer
- Mary Ann Jackson as Mary Ann
- Harry Spear as Harry
- Warren Mills as Rupert
- George Dunning as Our Gang member
- Andy Shuford as Our Gang member
- Gordon Thorpe as Our Gang member
- Pete the Pup as Himself

=== Additional cast ===
- Jay R. Smith as Kid at the dentist
- Edith Fortier as Pedestrian
- Fred Holmes as Bald man on the stairs
- Tenen Holtz as Man practicing the fiddle
- Michael Mark as Music teacher
- John B. O'Brien as Lemon vendor
- Lyle Tayo as Joe's mother
- Bret Black as Undetermined role

== See also ==
- Our Gang filmography
