= Barnum & Ringling, Inc. =

1928 film

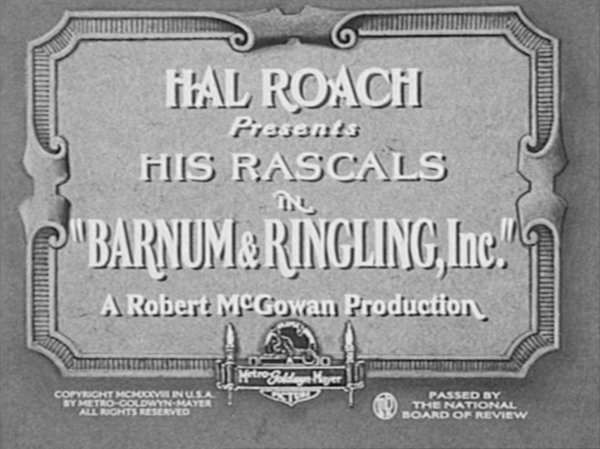
- Directed by: Robert F. McGowan
- Written by: H. M. Walker
- Produced by: Robert F. McGowan; Hal Roach
- Cinematography: Art Lloyd
- Edited by: Richard C. Currier
- Distributed by: Metro-Goldwyn-Mayer
- Release date: April 7, 1928
- Running time: 17' 51"
- Country: United States
- Languages: Silent; English intertitles

Barnum & Ringling, Inc. is a 1928 Our Gang short silent comedy film, the 74th in the series, directed and coproduced by Robert F. McGowan. The short's title is a reference to the Ringling Bros. and Barnum & Bailey Circus.

== Plot ==
The gang are living in the posh and fashionable Ritz-Biltmore hotel. They stage a circus with their motley collection of clothed pet animals, but chaos ensues when the circus animals escape and roam in and around various hotel rooms.

== Cast ==
=== The Gang ===
- Joe Cobb as Joe
- Jackie Condon as Jackie
- Jean Darling as Jean
- Allen Hoskins as Farina
- Bobby Hutchins as Wheezer
- Jay R. Smith as Jay
- Harry Spear as Harry
- Bobby Dean as Little Egypt
- Paul Toien as Our Gang member
- Pete the Pup as Himself

=== Additional cast ===
- George B. French as Desk clerk
- William Gillespie as Hotel manager
- Oliver Hardy as Startled drunk
- Dorothy Coburn as Lady who sits on egg
- Charles King as Amorous young man
- Ham Kinsey as Bellboy
- Lillianne Leighton as Lady with goose in dress
- Edna Marion as Maid
- Eric Mayne as Bearded man in bed
- Charles A. Millsfield as Toothless Frenchman
- Patsy O'Byrne as Lobby extra
- Eugene Pallette as Hotel detective
- May Wallace as Dowager
- Johnny Aber as Undetermined role
- Mildred Kornman as Undetermined role
- Retta Palmer as Undetermined role

== See also ==
- Our Gang filmography
