= Thundering Fleas =

1926 short film by Robert F. McGowan

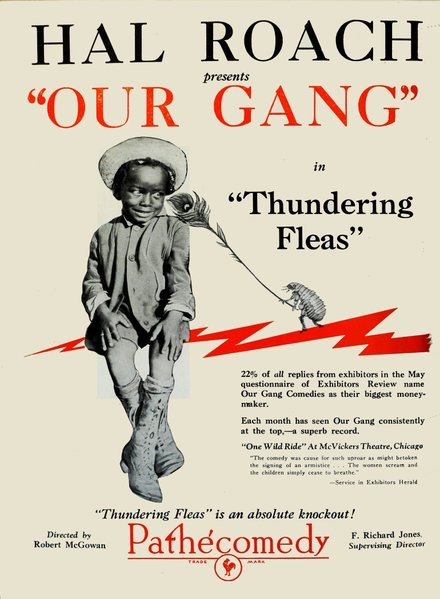
- Print ad
- Directed by: Robert F. McGowan
- Written by: Carl Harbaugh; Hal Roach; H. M. Walker; Hal Yates
- Produced by: F. Richard Jones; Hal Roach
- Starring: Mickey Daniels; Joe Cobb; Jackie Condon; Mary Kornman; Johnny Downs; Allen Hoskins; Scooter Lowry; Jay R. Smith; Clifton Young; Lassie Lou Ahern; Mildred Kornman; James Finlayson; Charley Chase; Oliver Hardy
- Cinematography: Art Lloyd
- Distributed by: Pathé Exchange
- Release date: July 4, 1926
- Running time: 20 minutes
- Country: United States
- Language: Silent with English intertitles

Thundering Fleas is a 1926 Our Gang film directed by Robert F. McGowan, the 51st in the series. The film marks 12-year-old Mickey Daniels's final Our Gang film as a regular cast member, although he later appeared as a guest star in some Our Gang films.

== Cast ==
=== The Gang ===
- Joe Cobb as Joe
- Jackie Condon as Jackie
- Mickey Daniels as Mickey
- Johnny Downs as Johnny
- Allen Hoskins as Farina
- Mary Kornman as Mary
- Scooter Lowry as Skooter
- Jay R. Smith as Jay
- Jannie Hoskins as Mango
- Clifton Young as Bonedust
- Buster the Dog as Magnolia

=== Additional cast ===
- Lassie Lou Ahern as Flower girl
- Harry Bowen as Flea circus spectator
- Sammy Brooks Flea circus spectator
- Allan Cavan as Father of the bride
- Charley Chase as Mustachioed wedding guest
- James Finlayson as Justice of the Peace
- Robert Finlayson as Musician
- George B. French as Professor Clements
- Dick Gilbert as Skooter's father
- Charlie Hall as Musician
- Oliver Hardy as Officer
- Ham Kinsey as Extra at the wedding
- Mildred Kornman as Skooter's sister
- Sam Lufkin as Extra at the wedding
- Jerry Mandy as Sheldon, the groom
- Martha Sleeper as Bride
- Lyle Tayo as Pedestrian without fleas
- Charley Young as Flea circus spectator

== See also ==
- Our Gang filmography
- Oliver Hardy filmography
