= Olympic Games (film) =

1927 film

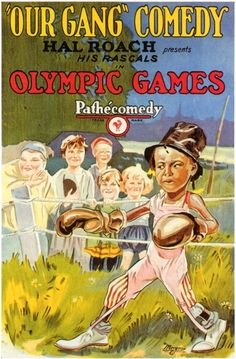
- Film poster
- Directed by: Anthony Mack
- Written by: Hal Roach; H. M. Walker
- Produced by: Hal Roach; F. Richard Jones
- Edited by: Richard C. Currier
- Distributed by: Pathé Exchange
- Release date: September 11, 1927
- Running time: 20 minutes
- Country: United States
- Language: Silent with English intertitles

Olympic Games is a 1927 American short silent comedy film, the 63th in the Our Gang series, directed by Anthony Mack.

== Plot ==
The gang competes in their version of the Olympics. As the boys try shot put, pole vault and hurdles, Wheezer teaches Minnie how to blow a raspberry. They secretly razzle the gang, but the gang attacks an outsider whom they accuse of making the noises. Farina tries the shot put, then later exhibits an exceptional ability in pole vaulting. Joe has troubles with the pull-up bar and javelin. Peggy and Jean arrive to cheer on their hero, Joe. A rival gang appears and pelts the kids with eggs and tomatoes, and the gang returns fire. They eventually catch Wheezer and Minnie razzing them and then run away with Minnie on their heels.

== Cast ==
=== The Gang ===
- Joe Cobb as Joe
- Jackie Condon as Jackie
- Allen Hoskins as Farina
- Bobby Hutchins as Wheezer
- Jay R. Smith as Spec
- Harry Spear as Harry
- Paul Toien as Our Gang member
- Pete the Pup as Minnie

=== Additional cast ===
- Johnny Aber as Rival kid
- Peggy Ahern as Peggie
- Jack Hanlon as Rival kid
- Jannie Hoskins as Mango
- Mildred Kornman as Mildred
- Jean Darling as Jean
- Scooter Lowry as Skooter
- Joseph Metzger as Undetermined role
- Robert Parrish as Undetermined role

== See also ==
- Our Gang filmography
