= The Spanking Age =

1928 film

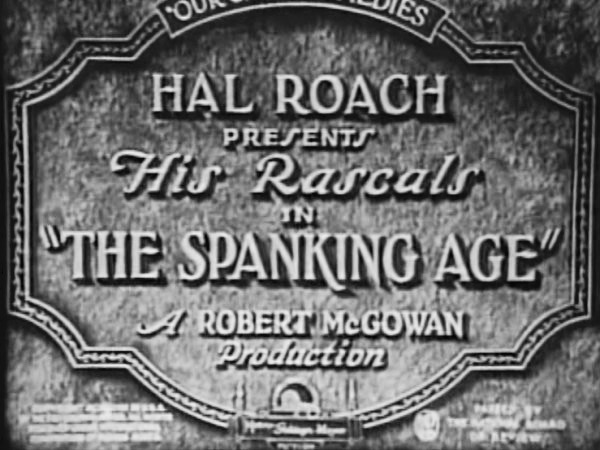
- Title card
- Directed by: Robert F. McGowan
- Written by: Anthony Mack; H. M. Walker
- Produced by: Hal Roach
- Starring: Mary Ann Jackson; Bobby Hutchins; Jean Darling; Joe Cobb; Allen Hoskins; Harry Spear; Pete the Pup; Lyle Tayo
- Cinematography: Art Lloyd
- Edited by: Richard C. Currier
- Distributed by: Metro-Goldwyn-Mayer
- Release date: December 15, 1928
- Running time: 20:38
- Country: United States
- Languages: Silent; English intertitles

The Spanking Age is a 1928 Our Gang short silent comedy film, the 80th in the series, directed by Robert F. McGowan. The film was considered lost until a copy surfaced in 1990. It was the first film in the series to be released with a synchronized orchestral musical score with sound effects.

== Plot ==
Mary Ann and Wheezer are the children of a widowed inventor who are forced to endure the cruelties of their stepmother and stepsister. The kids exact revenge by rigging a few clever contraptions of their own. The father sells a patent worth millions and leaves the stepmother and stepdaughter.

== Cast ==
=== The Gang ===
- Mary Ann Jackson as Mary Ann
- Bobby Hutchins as Wheezer
- Jean Darling as Jean, the stepsister
- Joe Cobb as Joe
- Allen Hoskins as Farina
- Harry Spear as Harry
- Pete the Pup as Petie

=== Additional cast ===
- Lyle Tayo as Stepmother
