= Dog Days (1925 film) =

1925 film

- Directed by: Robert F. McGowan
- Written by: Hal Roach; H. M. Walker
- Produced by: Hal Roach
- Starring: Mickey Daniels; Joe Cobb; Mary Kornman; Jackie Condon; Allen Hoskins; Eugene Jackson; Pal the Dog; Johnny Downs; Peggy Ahern; Ivadell Carter; William Gillespie; Joseph Morrison; Lyle Tayo; Dorothy Vernon
- Cinematography: Art Lloyd
- Distributed by: Pathé Exchange
- Release date: March 8, 1925
- Running time: 20:17
- Country: United States
- Languages: Silent; English intertitles

Dog Days is a 1925 short silent comedy film, the 36th in the Our Gang series, directed by Robert F. McGowan.

== Plot ==
The boys are showing their dogs to each other when little rich girl Mary Kornman rides by in her pony-drawn cart. When the pony shies and runs away, Mickey comes to the rescue with his dog. In gratitude, Mary invites all of the boys and their dogs to her party, but her wealthy mother disapproves.

== Cast ==
=== The Gang ===
- Joe Cobb – Joe
- Jackie Condon – Jackie
- Mickey Daniels – Mickey
- Allen Hoskins – Farina
- Eugene Jackson – Pineapple
- Mary Kornman – Mary
- Pal the Dog – Himself

=== Additional cast ===
- Johnny Downs – boy at party
- Peggy Ahern – girl at party
- Ivadell Carter – girl at party
- William Gillespie – Mary's father
- Joseph Morrison – butler
- Lyle Tayo – mother
- Dorothy Vernon – Mickey's mother
