= Jack Hanlon =

American actor

- Born: February 15, 1916; Fort Worth, Texas, U.S.
- Died: December 13, 2012 (aged 96); Las Vegas, Nevada, U.S.
- Occupation(s): Actor, furniture mover
- Years active: 1926–1932
- Spouse: Jean Hanlon (1940–1977; her death)

Jack Clem Hanlon (February 15, 1916 – December 13, 2012) was an American child actor known for his role in Our Gang and silent films. According to Variety, at the time of his death he was the oldest living person to appear in the Our Gang comedies and likely the last surviving cast member of the Buster Keaton silent classic The General.

Hanlon was born in Fort Worth, Texas, and was raised by his grandmother in Culver City, California. He started acting at age 10. His first role was in Buster Keaton's 1926 film, The General, before appearing in two 1927 Our Gang/Little Rascals silent shorts: The Glorious Fourth and Olympic Games. He had what was characterized as a breakout performance in the 1929 William Wyler-directed part-talkie The Shakedown, co-starring James Murray and Barbara Kent. He also had minor roles in Romance, where as an uncredited extra he got his first on-screen kiss from Greta Garbo.

Between 1930 and 1933, Hanlon appeared in eight more films before giving up his acting career in 1932. After graduating from high school, he played minor league baseball and served as an Army Air Corps paratrooper during World War II. After the war, Hanlon, worked as a furniture mover for Allied Van Lines. He was married to Jean Hanlon from 1940 until her death in 1977. He moved to Las Vegas, Nevada in 1994. He stayed friends with fellow Our Gang alumnus and Las Vegan, Jay R. Smith. He died on December 13, 2012.
