= Ask Grandma =

1925 film

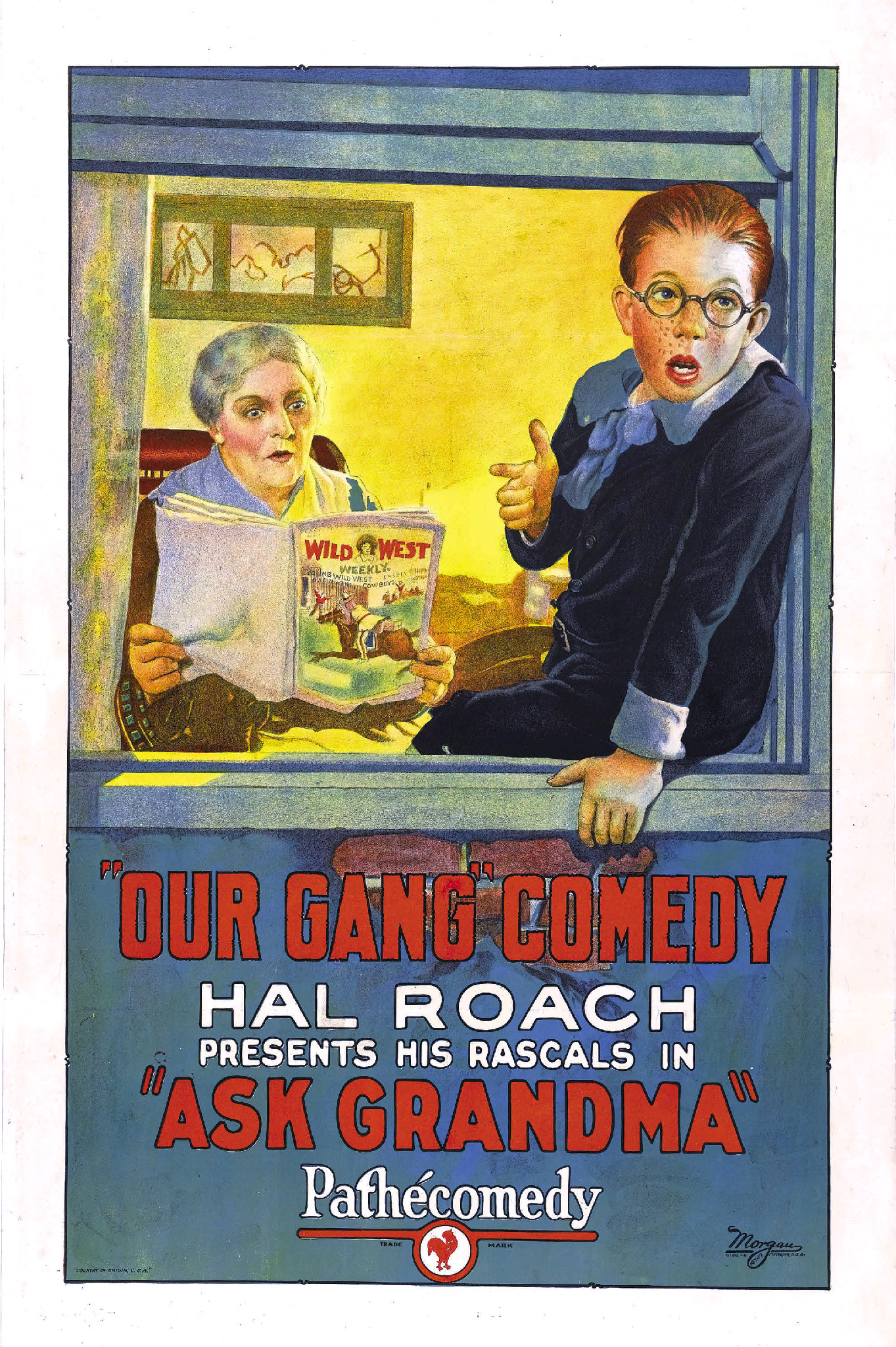
- Directed by: Robert F. McGowan
- Written by: Hal Roach; H. M. Walker
- Produced by: Hal Roach
- Starring: Mickey Daniels; Mary Kornman; Johnny Downs; Joe Cobb; Allen Hoskins; Jackie Condon; Sonny Loy; David Sharpe; Gabe Saienz; Florence Lee; Lyle Tayo; Noah Young; Katherine Grant
- Cinematography: Art Lloyd
- Edited by: T. J. Crizer
- Distributed by: Pathé Exchange
- Release date: May 31, 1925
- Running time: 25:19
- Country: United States
- Languages: Silent; English intertitles

Ask Grandma is a 1925 American short silent comedy film, the 39th in the Our Gang series, directed by Robert F. McGowan.

== Plot ==
Full film

Mickey's overprotective mother is trying to raise him as a gentleman by dressing him like a sissy and enrolling him in dance school. The only family member who sympathizes with Mickey's plight is his grandmother, who knows that he is harboring a crush on precocious Mary. Grandma encourages Mickey to pursue Mary and agrees to cover for him when he sneaks away to visit her. Neighborhood bully Johnny, who also has eyes for Mary, slugs Joe. Mickey fights Johnny and is losing until Grandma rallies him, and Mickey gains the upper hand. Johnny's father becomes involved just as Grandma enters the fight. Mickey's mother, having witnessed her son in action, realizes that she must treat Mickey as a proper boy.

== Cast ==
=== The Gang ===
- Joe Cobb – Joe
- Jackie Condon – Jackie
- Mickey Daniels – Mickey
- Johnny Downs – Johnny
- Allen Hoskins – Farina
- Mary Kornman – Mary
- Sonny Loy Sing – Joy

=== Additional cast ===
- David Sharpe – kid in flashback/stunt double
- Gabe Saienz – kid in flashback
- Florence Lee – Grandma
- Lyle Tayo – Martha, Mickey's mother
- Noah Young – Johnny's father
- Katherine Grant – ballet instructor
