= Seeing the World =

1927 film

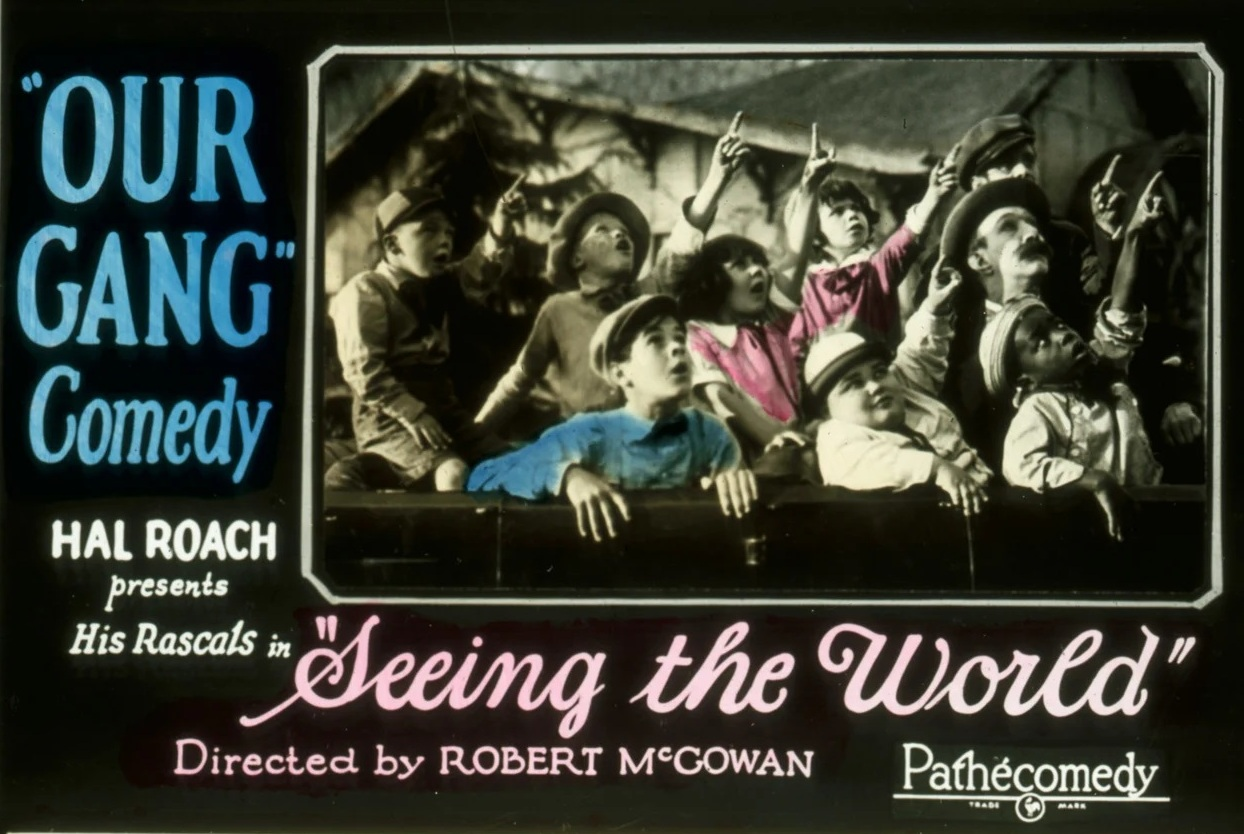
- Lobby card
- Directed by: Anthony Mack; Robert F. McGowan
- Written by: Hal Roach; H. M. Walker
- Produced by: F. Richard Jones; Hal Roach
- Starring: Joe Cobb; Jackie Condon; Jean Darling; Johnny Downs; Allen Hoskins; Scooter Lowry; Jay R. Smith; Peggy Eames; Jean Darling; James Finlayson; Stan Laurel
- Cinematography: Art Lloyd
- Edited by: Richard C. Currier
- Production company: Hal Roach Studios
- Distributed by: Pathé Exchange
- Release date: February 13, 1927
- Running time: 19:30
- Country: United States
- Language: Silent (English intertitles)

Full film

Seeing the World (also known as A Roamin' Holiday) is a 1927 silent Our Gang film, the 57th in the series, directed by Robert F. McGowan and Anthony Mack. The film features James Finlayson and contains a brief appearance by Stan Laurel, who later wrote: "That 'Seeing the World' is a very bad film, plus the print—I felt sorry for Finlayson practically working alone with nothing funny to do—He made every face in the book in this one!!"

== Plot ==
The gang's teacher wins a trip to Europe, but the gang accompanies him causing the trip to become a nightmare. The group treks through Venice, Rome, Pompeii, Naples, London and Paris, where Farina tries to retrieve her lost tooth stolen by a pigeon on the railings of the Eiffel Tower. Both Farina and Finlayson, who tries to rescue her, fall from the side of the tower. The teacher awakens, realizing that the whole adventure was a dream. He had fallen asleep after the gang mixed sleeping potion into his water.

== Cast ==
=== The Gang ===
- Joe Cobb as Joe
- Jackie Condon as Jackie
- Johnny Downs as Johnny
- Allen Hoskins as Farina
- Scooter Lowry as Skooter
- Jay R. Smith as Jay
- Peggy Eames as Peggy

=== Additional cast ===
- James Finlayson as James Finlayson, the schoolteacher
- Jean Darling as Extra at pier
- Ed Brandenburg as Window washer
- Frank Butler as English pedestrian
- Dorothy Darling as Extra at pier
- Charlie Hall as English chauffeur
- Ham Kinsey as Ship's official
- Stan Laurel as English pedestrian
- Charles McMurphy as Ship's official
- Charley Young as Extra at pier
- David, Prince of Wales as himself (stock footage)
- Gaston Doumergue as himself (stock footage)
- Yusef of Morocco as himself (stock footage)

== See also ==
- Our Gang filmography
- Stan Laurel filmography
