= Crazy like a Fox (1926 film) =

1926 film

- Charley Chase as Wilson, the groom
- Directed by: Leo McCarey
- Written by: Charley Chase; H. M. Walker
- Produced by: Hal Roach
- Starring: Charley Chase
- Cinematography: Len Powers
- Edited by: Richard C. Currier
- Distributed by: Pathé Exchange
- Release date: August 22, 1926
- Running time: 25 minutes
- Country: United States
- Language: Silent (English intertitles)

Crazy Like a Fox (full short)

Crazy like a Fox is a 1926 American short comedy film directed by Leo McCarey and starring Charley Chase. The two-reel silent stars Chase as a young man who feigns insanity in order to get out of an arranged marriage, only to find out that his sweetheart is the girl he has been arranged to marry. Chase would remake the film as The Wrong Miss Wright (1937) in the sound era during his tenure at Columbia Pictures.

The film features Oliver Hardy in a small role filmed shortly before his teaming with Stan Laurel.

== Cast ==
- Charley Chase as Wilson, the Groom
- William V. Mong as George, the Bride's Father
- Martha Sleeper as The Bride
- Milla Davenport as Mother
- William Blaisdell as Gov. Harrison
- Max Asher as Butler
- Al Hallett as Mr. Gloom, the valet
- Tyler Brooke (uncredited)
- Helen Gilmore (uncredited)
- Oliver Hardy as Charley's Victim (uncredited)
- Fred Kelsey as Man with Badge on Train (uncredited)
- Ham Kinsey as Train Passenger (uncredited)
- Charles Lloyd as Train Passenger (uncredited)
- Jerry Mandy as Hospital orderly (uncredited)
- Kewpie Morgan as Rotund Conductor (uncredited)
- L.J. O'Connor as Family Doctor (uncredited)
- Tiny Sandford as Conductor (uncredited)
- Emma Tansey as Elderly Train Passenger (uncredited)
- Lyle Tayo as Nurse (uncredited)

== Preservation ==
Crazy Like a Fox was preserved by the Academy Film Archive in 2006.
