= Yes, Yes, Nanette =

1925 film

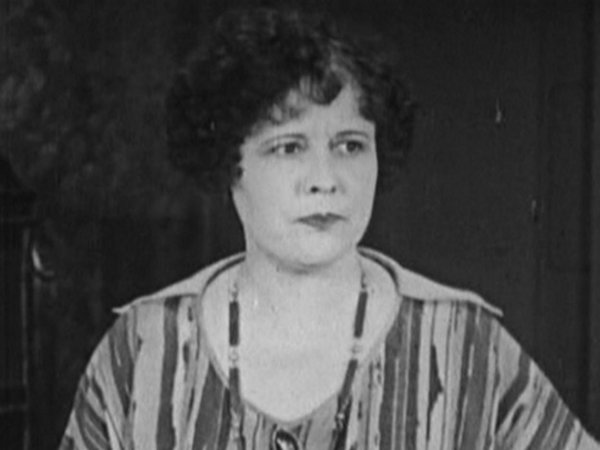
- Lyle Tayo in Yes, Yes, Nanette
- Directed by: Stan Laurel; Clarence Hennecke
- Written by: Carl Harbaugh
- Produced by: Hal Roach
- Starring: Lyle Tayo; James Finlayson
- Cinematography: Frank Young
- Distributed by: Pathé Exchange
- Release date: July 19, 1925
- Running time: 9 minutes
- Country: United States
- Languages: Silent film English intertitles

Yes, Yes, Nanette is a 1925 American silent film comedy starring Lyle Tayo and James Finlayson. It also features Oliver Hardy and was co-directed by Stan Laurel. Yes, Yes, Nanette is a parody of the contemporary musical comedy No, No, Nanette.

== Cast ==
- Lyle Tayo as Nanette
- James Finlayson as Hillory, the new husband
- Jack Gavin as Father of Ten Children
- Grant Gorman as Sonny
- Sally O'Neil as Daughter (as Sue O'Neill)
- Lyle Tayo as The Bride
- Oliver Hardy as Her former sweetheart (as "Babe" Hardy)
- Pete the Pup

== See also ==
- List of American films of 1925
