= Billy Naylor =

American actor (1916–2011)

- Born: William A. Naylor; September 22, 1916; San Francisco, California, U.S.
- Died: October 5, 2011 (aged 95); Vero Beach, Florida, U.S.
- Occupation: Film actor
- Years active: 1925–1935

Billy Naylor (September 22, 1916 – October 5, 2011) was an American child actor who appeared in several Our Gang films during the silent era. Beginning his screen career in 1925, some of his movies included Uncle Tom's Uncle, The Fourth Alarm, and Telling Whoppers. At the age of 18, he joined the Screen Actors Guild, making him the youngest member to enter the labor union. He left Hollywood in 1935. Naylor was the oldest living member of the Our Gang series at the time of his death on October 5, 2011. He was a devout atheist who supported the Freethought Hall fund.
