= 45 Minutes from Hollywood =

1926 film

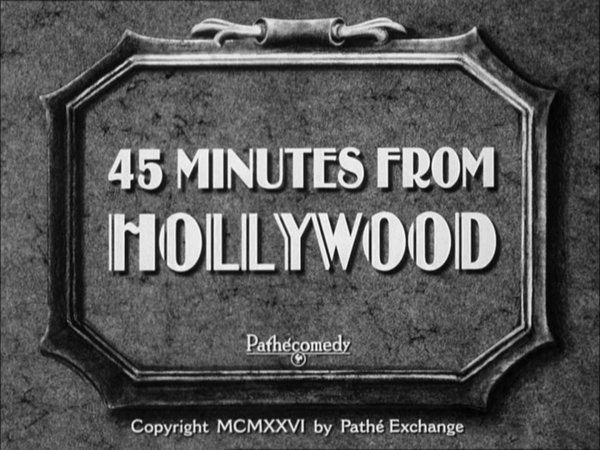
- Title card
- Directed by: Fred Guiol
- Written by: Hal Roach; H.M. Walker
- Produced by: Hal Roach
- Starring: Glenn Tryon; Charlotte Mineau
- Distributed by: Pathé Exchange
- Release date: December 26, 1926
- Running time: 21 minutes
- Country: United States
- Language: Silent (English intertitles)

45 Minutes From Hollywood is a 1926 American two-reel silent comedy film directed by Fred Guiol and released by Pathé Exchange. The film's runtime is 21 minutes.

At the time, it was known as a Glenn Tryon vehicle, but today it is best remembered as the second instance of Stan Laurel and Oliver Hardy appearing in the same film together — although they do not share any scenes — at least half a decade after their first chance billing in The Lucky Dog (1921).

As the film uses footage from the Theda Bara star vehicle Madame Mystery (released April 1926, featuring Hardy in the supporting cast, and co-written and co-directed by Laurel), it is also the last screen appearance of silent film vamp Bara.

== Plot ==
A California family is sent a letter informing them that if they do not quickly travel to Hollywood to pay a fee they owe, they will be evicted from their home. The family decides to send Grandpa, but the son so badly wants to see Hollywood that he convinces his mother to let him go, too.

== Cast ==
- Glenn Tryon as Orville (as Glenn Tyron)
- Charlotte Mineau as Orville's Mother
- Jack Rube Clifford as Orville's Grandpa (as Rube Clifford)
- Molly O'Day as Orville's Sister (as Sue O'Neil)
- Theda Bara as Theda Bara (archive footage) (uncredited)
- Mickey Daniels as Mickey Daniels (archive footage) (uncredited)
- Scooter Lowry as Train Conductor (uncredited)
- Allen "Farina" Hoskins as Farina Hoskins (archive footage) (uncredited)
- Jackie Condon as Jackie Condon (archive footage) (uncredited)
- Jay R. Smith as Jay Smith (archive footage) (uncredited)
- Johnny Downs as Johnny Downs (archive footage) (uncredited)
- Joe Cobb as Joe Cobb (archive footage) (uncredited)
- Oliver Hardy as Hotel Detective
- Edna Murphy as Em, Hotel Detective's Wife
- Jerry Mandy as Imbibing Trashman
- Ham Kinsey as Hotel Guest (uncredited)
- Ed Brandenburg as Hotel Guest (uncredited)
- Jack Hill
- Stan Laurel as Hotel Guest (uncredited)
- Al Hallett as Minor Role (uncredited)
- Tiny Sandford as Train Conductor (uncredited)
- Monte Collins as Hotel Guest (uncredited)
- The Hal Roach Bathing Beauties as Hal Roach Bathing Beauties (archive footage) (uncredited)
- Janet Gaynor as Hotel Guest (uncredited)

== Production ==
Stan appears in bed in his only scene. He wears a nightcap, nightgown, and a large comedy mustache. Jimmy Finlayson appears looking like this in several later Laurel and Hardy films. Oliver also features a similar mustache. Laurel's name does not appear in the credits for this film, but Hardy's name does.
