= The Snob Buster =

1925 film directed by Albert S. Rogell

- Directed by: Albert S. Rogell
- Written by: Forrest Sheldon
- Produced by: W. Ray Johnston
- Starring: Reed Howes; Wilfred Lucas; George B. French
- Cinematography: Ross Fisher
- Production company: Harry J. Brown Productions
- Distributed by: Rayart Pictures
- Release date: May 19, 1925
- Running time: 5 reels
- Country: United States
- Language: Silent (English intertitles)

The Snob Buster is a 1925 American silent drama film directed by Albert S. Rogell and starring Reed Howes, Wilfred Lucas, and George B. French.

== Plot ==
As described in a film magazine review, Theodore Pendergast, the only son in a wealthy Boston family, goes to training camp. A few years later, he returns as a regular guy. With him comes his buddy Butch McGuire, an ex-prize fighter. His family treats Butch with disdain, and insist upon their son undergoing an examination from four mental specialists. They recommend that he go to a private sanitarium. Ted rebels, and goes to live with Butch. He falls in love with the former fighter's sister Molly. To prove his love, he engages in a prize fight his rival, Kid Lowry, in which he is the victor.

== Cast ==
- Reed Howes as Ted Pendergast
- Wilfred Lucas as John Pendergast
- George B. French as Uncle Tobias
- David Kirby as Butch McGuire
- Gloria Grey as Molly McGuire
- W. Ray Johnston as Kid Lowry
- Max Asher as Schultz

== Bibliography ==
- Darby, William. Masters of Lens and Light: A Checklist of Major Cinematographers and Their Feature Films. Scarecrow Press, 1991. ISBN 0-8108-2454-X
