= Circus Fever =

1925 film

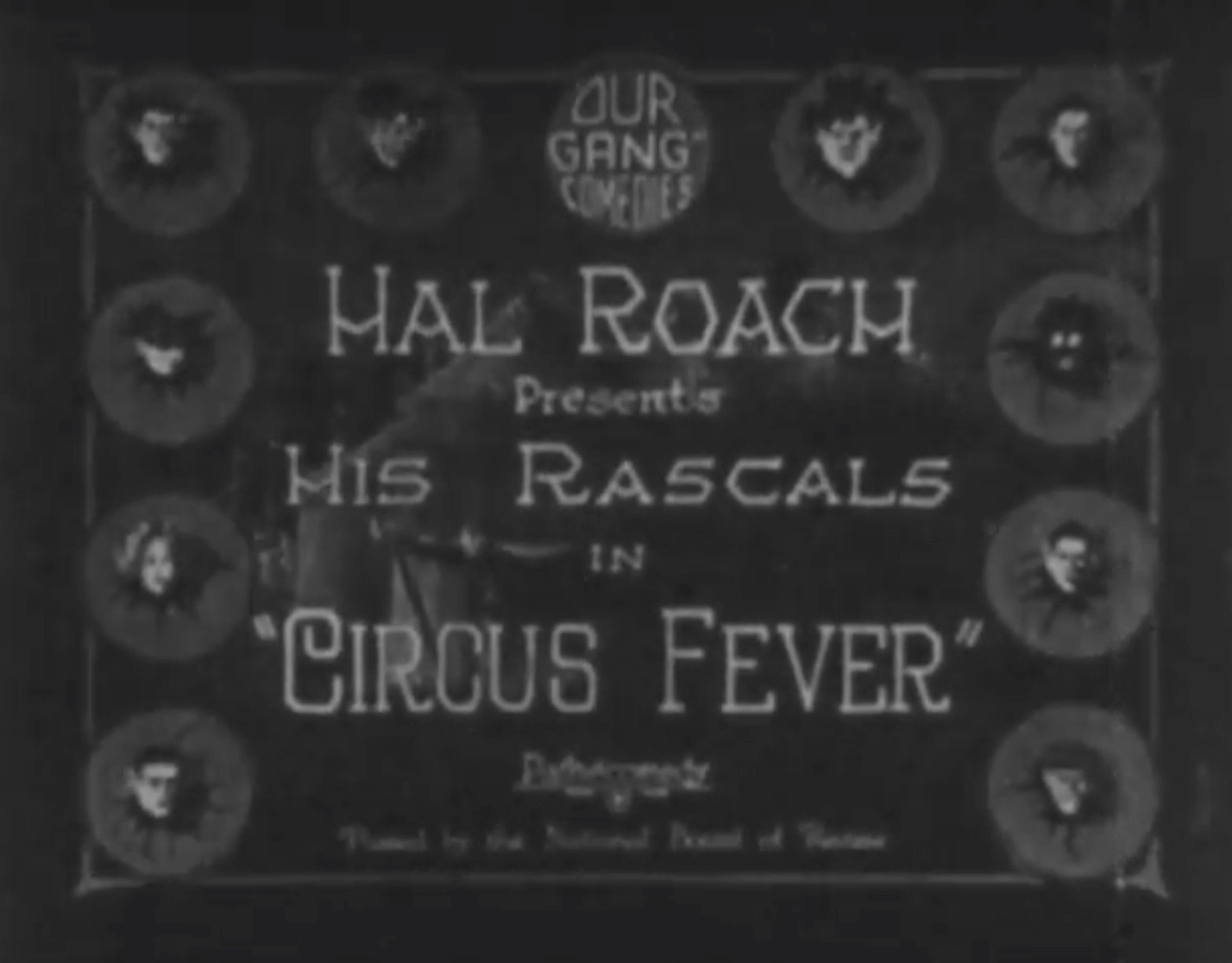
- Directed by: Robert F. McGowan
- Written by: Hal Roach; H. M. Walker
- Produced by: Hal Roach
- Starring: Mickey Daniels; Jackie Condon; Mary Kornman; Joe Cobb; Allen Hoskins; Eugene Jackson; Pal the Dog; Johnny Downs; David Durand; Helen Gilmore; Joseph Morrison; Charley Young
- Cinematography: Art Lloyd
- Edited by: T. J. Crizer
- Distributed by: Pathé Exchange
- Release date: February 8, 1925
- Running time: 23:30
- Country: United States
- Language: Silent (English intertitles)

Circus Fever is a 1925 American short silent comedy film, the 35th in the Our Gang series, directed by Robert F. McGowan.

== Plot ==
Farina contacts speckled fever, and, in order to escape school and attend the circus, Mickey, Mary, Jackie and Joe fake having the disease with the aid of a paintbrush. Their parents and the doctor are not deceived and punishment follows in the form of castor oil. The school classes that they attempted to evade are dismissed so that the students may attend the circus.

== Cast ==
=== The Gang ===
- Joe Cobb as Joe
- Jackie Condon as Jackie
- Mickey Daniels as Mickey
- Allen Hoskins as Farina
- Eugene Jackson as Pineapple
- Mary Kornman as Mary
- Pal the Dog as himself

=== Additional cast ===
- Johnny Downs as kid on bicycle
- David Durand as Mickey and Jackie's brother
- Helen Gilmore as Mickey and Jackie's mother
- Joseph Morrison as Dr. Royal Sorghum
- Charley Young as Dr. Pipp
