= What a Man! (1944 film) =

1944 film by William Beaudine

- Directed by: William Beaudine
- Written by: William Beaudine; Beryl Sachs
- Produced by: Barney A. Sarecky
- Starring: Johnny Downs; Wanda McKay; Robert Kent
- Cinematography: Marcel Le Picard
- Edited by: Carl Himm
- Music by: Edward J. Kay
- Production company: Monogram Pictures
- Distributed by: Monogram Pictures
- Release date: January 31, 1944
- Running time: 67 minutes
- Country: United States
- Language: English

What a Man! is a 1944 American comedy film directed by William Beaudine and starring Johnny Downs, Wanda McKay and Robert Kent.

== Cast ==
- Johnny Downs as Henry M. Burrows
- Wanda McKay as Joan Rankin
- Robert Kent as Steven M. Anderson
- Etta McDaniel as BlueBell
- Harry Holman as Harold D. Prewitt
- I. Stanford Jolley as Parsons
- Wheeler Oakman as Tim - 1st Detective
- Lillian Bronson as Constance Burrows
- Jack Baxley as George Rankin - Joan's Father
- John Ince as Doctor Williams
- Betty Sinclair as Office Worker
- Dick Rush as Dutch - 2nd Detective
- James Farley as Roberts - Office Worker
- Henry Hall as Andy Johnson
- Ralph Cathey as Office Boy

== Bibliography ==
- Marshall, Wendy L. William Beaudine: From Silents to Television. Scarecrow Press, 2005.
