= Mildred Kornman =

American actress (1925–2022)

- Born: Mildred Gene Kornman; July 10, 1925; Beverly Hills, California, U.S.
- Died: August 19, 2022 (aged 97); Mount Vernon, Washington, U.S.
- Occupations: Actress; model; businesswoman; photographer
- Years active: 1926–1962
- Spouse: Norton Hinsey (1943–19??)
- Website: www.mildredkornman.com

Mildred Gene Kornman (July 10, 1925 – August 19, 2022), also billed as Ricki VanDusen, was an American actress, model, businesswoman, and photographer. At the time of her death, she was the last living actress of the silent era.

== Life and career ==
Kornman was born in Hollywood on July 10, 1925. She was the younger sister of fellow child actress Mary Kornman. Her father was Eugene Kornman, a professional still photographer who was employed by Harold Lloyd at the time of Kornman's birth. She was named after Lloyd's wife, actress Mildred Davis.

When Kornman was nine months old, she appeared with her sister Mary in The Fourth Alarm. Along with Mary, she was featured in the Our Gang short films series. Mildred was initially a regular in the series, with appearances from 1926 to 1928, and returned for a second stint from 1930 until 1935, in uncredited, non-speaking roles when many children were needed for a scene, such as a classroom.

After graduating Hollywood High School, Kornman became an actress at 20th Century Fox, albeit only in uncredited roles, under the name Ricki VanDusen. She was also a model, featuring in magazines such as Vogue and Harpers Bazaar, and in television commercials. She majored in art, English, and Spanish at the University of California, Los Angeles. Kornman married Norton Hinsey on December 30, 1943.

In 2014, Kornman attended a reunion of Our Gang cast members, hosted by The Sons of the Desert as part of their 19th International Convention. In 2015, aged 89, she was living on a remote ranch in Utah. Kornman was one of the final surviving actors from the Our Gang series, which was produced from 1922 to 1944. Kornman died on August 19, 2022, at the age of 97. She was one of the longest lived members of the Our Gang cast.

== Filmography ==
Year	Title	Role	Notes
1926	Thundering Fleas	Mildred	Short film
1926	The Fourth Alarm	Mildred	Short film
1926	War Feathers	Mildred	Short film
1926	The Nickel-Hopper		Short film
1927	Bring Home the Turkey	Mildred	Short film
1927	Ten Years Old	Mildred	Short film
1927	Love My Dog	Little Girl on the Building Ledge	Short film
1927	Baby Brother	Jackie's Sister	Short film
1927	Olympic Games	Mildred	Short film
1927	Heebee Jeebees	Mildred	Short film Lost film
1928	Dog Heaven	Mildred	Short film
1928	Playin' Hookey	baby	Short film
1928	Spook-Spoofing	Mildred	Short film
1928	Rainy Days	Mildred	Short film
1928	The Smile Wins	Mildred	Short film
1928	Edison, Marconi & Co.	Mildred	Short film Lost film
1928	Barnum & Ringling, Inc.	Mildred	Short film
1928	Fair and Muddy	Mildred	Short film
1930	Teacher's Pet	student	Short film
1930	School's Out	student	Short film
1932	Birthday Blues	Girl at Party	Short film
1933	Fish Hooky	Student	Short film
1935	Little Sinner		Short film
1936	Our Gang Follies of 1936		Short film
1937	Hoosier Schoolboy	(uncredited)	
1938	Mr. Boggs Steps Out	(uncredited)	
1938	Mad About Music	Schoolgirl	
1944	Up in Arms	(Goldwyn Girl) (uncredited)	
1944	Atlantic City	Woman at Racetrack (uncredited)	
1945	Diamond Horseshoe	Chorine (uncredited)	
1945	The Dolly Sisters	Lady in Booking Office (uncredited)	
1946	Cinderella Jones	Junior League Member (uncredited)	
1947	I Wonder Who's Kissing Her Now	Chorine (uncredited)	
1947	T-Men	Girl on Plane (uncredited)	
1953	Abbott and Costello Go to Mars	Girl (uncredited)	
1962	The Interns	Model (uncredited)	

== See also ==
- Our Gang filmography
