= Tire Trouble =

1924 film

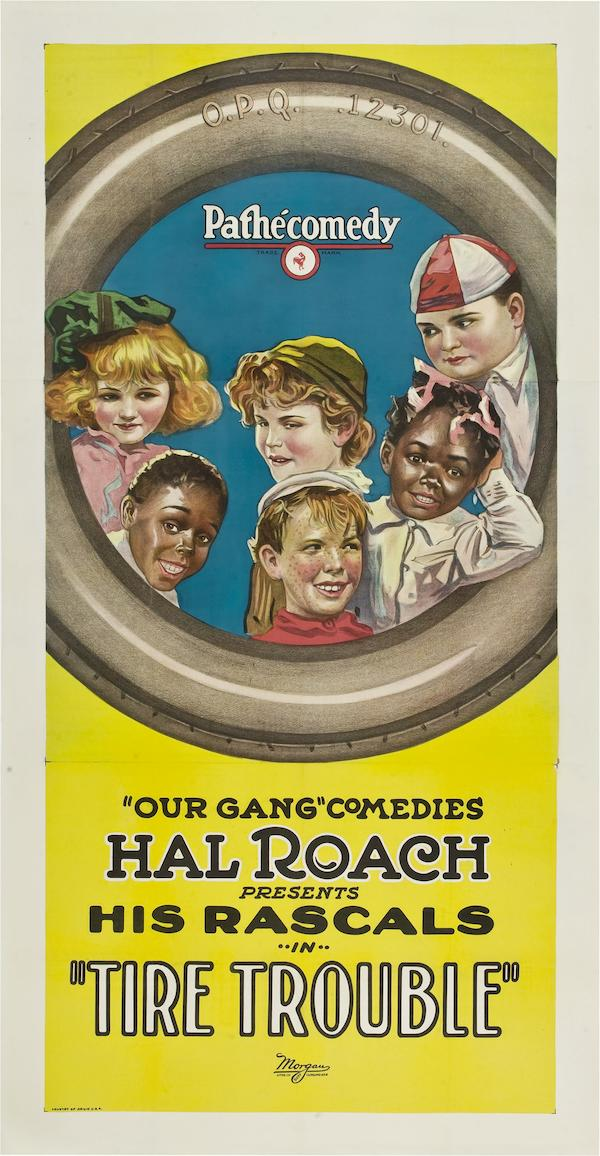
- Film poster
- Directed by: Robert F. McGowan
- Written by: Hal Roach; H. M. Walker
- Produced by: Hal Roach
- Starring: Joe Cobb; Jackie Condon; Mickey Daniels; Allen Hoskins; Ernest Morrison; Mary Kornman; Harry Rattenberry; George B. French; Lyle Tayo; Noah Young
- Distributed by: Pathé Exchange
- Release date: January 13, 1924
- Running time: 25:21
- Country: United States
- Languages: Silent; English intertitles

Tire Trouble is a 1924 American short silent comedy film directed by Robert F. McGowan. It was the 21st Our Gang short subject to be released.

== Plot ==
The gang are running their own taxi service, and come across Ernie and Farina delivering laundry to J. William McAllister, the wealthiest man in town. His doctor and his wife have both convinced him that he's sick, but when the kids visit him, they convince him otherwise. They all drive off in the taxi to Emerald Beach and have the time of their lives.

== Cast ==
=== The Gang ===
- Joe Cobb — Joe
- Jackie Condon — Jackie
- Mickey Daniels — Mickey
- Allen Hoskins — Farina
- Ernest Morrison — Sunshine Sammy
- Mary Kornman — Mary

=== Additional cast ===
- Harry Rattenberry — J. William McAllister
- George B. French — doctor
- Lyle Tayo — Mme. La Rue
- Noah Young — police officer
