= Scooter Lowry =

American actor (1919–1989)

Elmer Lowry
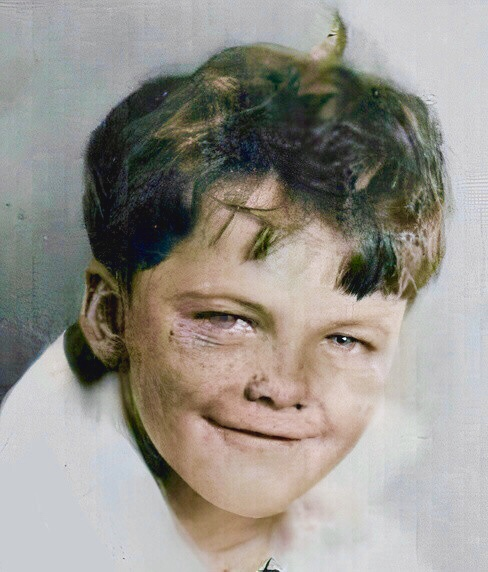
- Lowry in 1926
- Born: December 19, 1919; Brooklyn, New York, U.S.
- Died: c. May 1, 1989 (aged 69); Miami Beach, Florida, U.S.
- Occupation: Child actor
- Years active: 1926–1934
- Spouse: Shirley Lowry (m. 1940s–?)

Elmer Camden Lowry (December 19, 1919 – c. 1 May 1989) was an American child actor and vaudevillian. He appeared in several Our Gang short films as Skooter.

His character, Washington-born Skooter, was fond of Charles G. Dawes, known for his freckles, hat, and personality. He was dubbed "the original tough guy", due to his mean, harsh "bad boy" persona in the Our Gang films, at times referred as villainous. Known for his talented dancing, singing, and impersonations, Lowry was most well known for that during his vaudeville days.

== Early life ==
Lowry was born in the borough of Brooklyn, New York City on December 19, 1919, to Willard S. and Anna L. Lowry. At the age of five, he started in vaudeville. He later moved to Hempstead after his parents divorced. Originally nicknamed Skippy, his nickname became Scooter since "he was always scooting around".

== Acting career ==
Lowry got his start in Our Gang after he won a dance contest promoted by Gus Edwards. The award was a thousand US dollars, two tickets to Hollywood and a year's contract with Hal Roach Studios. He was the first Gang member to be from New York. He made his first appearance in the film Thundering Fleas. At 7 years old, Lowry was often mistakenly called the youngest member of the gang, with him being mistakenly called 4 years old. Lowry's character, young tough kid Skooter, was a popular character of the Gang. He mostly appeared donning an undersized, white bucket hat. He appeared in a total of 13 Our Gang films. One time, Lowry interrupted an important conversation that Our Gang creator Hal Roach was talking in, in which Lowry wanted to join. By the time he left, Lowry was paid $180.00, thrice the amount of his previous salary, $60.00. He was replaced by Harry Spear as the tough kid in the gang.

His final film was Chinatown Charlie as Oswald.

== Vaudeville ==
=== 1920s ===
After Our Gang, he became a vaudevillian and made acts with his former Our Gang alumni. His first act was with former Our Gang alumnus Mary Kornman. They were later joined by Johnny Downs. The three visited St. Joseph children's hospital in 1928, where the kids in the hospital became admirers of the gang, specifically the three. Lowry was not disturbed until a couple of nurses patted his head, which embarrassed him and almost took away his stage presence. They met Providence, Rhode Island mayor James E. Dunne in 1928, with Lowry expressing his wish that Al Smith would win the presidential election. Around this time, Lowry made acts with Joe Cobb.

=== 1930s ===
In 1930, Lowry, among others, toured in the RKO Palace. He also was presented in a skit called Doin' Tough, in which episodes of Our Gang between 1926 and 1927 are shown, and after a while, Lowry comes on doing acts. After, Lowry made "solo" acts. In 1932, Lowry made a guest appearance in the Pittsburgh Press Seckatary Hawkins Club on 8 o'clock for half an hour over KQV. He was still touring by 1934.

== Adult years ==
From his draft records, it was found that Scooter served in the U.S. military. Between 1936 and 1950, Lowry was arrested for driving without a license, in which in two, he only served five days in prison. Lowry was hit by a truck in 1937, so he had to be hospitalized due to chin, teeth, and right elbow injuries. In 1938, 18 year old Lowry was involved in an accident which injured retired builder Edward C. Merritt and his wife, in which Merritt couldn't control his vehicle. In 1950, he faced court after calling the police claiming that his wife, Shirley, was trying to kill herself, even though she wasn't. He went to jail after being charged with disorderly conduct. After this, his whereabouts became mostly unknown, with the only hints being that he worked at a restaurant.

== Death ==
He resided in Miami Beach, Florida, with his mother, Anna. Anna died in 1972. Lowry's dead body was found on May 1, 1989 in Miami Beach, Florida by local police. An ID proved that it was Lowry, with name and date of birth.

== Personal life ==
He had a sister, Lillian, who resided in Lakeland. He married Shirley Helen Baker (1925-1987) in 1944.

== Filmography ==
Year	Title	Role	Notes
1926	Thundering Fleas	Skooter	Short film
1926	Shivering Spooks	Skooter	Short film
1926	The Fourth Alarm	Skooter	Short film
1926	War Feathers	Skooter	Short film
1926	Telling Whoppers	Skooter	Short film
1926	45 Minutes from Hollywood	Skooter	Short film
1927	Bring Home the Turkey	Skooter	Short film
1927	Seeing the World	Skooter	Short film
1927	Ten Years Old	Skooter	Short film
1927	Love My Dog	Skooter	Short film
1927	Tired Business Men	Skooter	Short film
1927	Baby Brother	Skooter	Short film
1927	Olympic Games	Skooter	Short film, deleted scene
1927	Chicken Feed	Skooter	Short film
1928	Chinatown Charlie	Oswald	

== See also ==
- Our Gang personnel
- List of vaudeville performers: L–Z
