= Jerry Mandy =

American actor

- Born: June 5, 1892; Utica, New York, US
- Died: May 1, 1945 (aged 52); Hollywood, California, US
- Other name: Ricardo Mandia
- Years active: 1923–1945

Jerry Mandy (June 5, 1892 – May 1, 1945) was an American film actor. He appeared in 114 films between 1923 and 1945. He was born in Utica, New York and died in Hollywood, California, from a heart attack at age 52.

== Selected filmography ==
- North Star (1925)
- Behind the Front (1926)
- You'd Be Surprised (1926)
- Thundering Fleas (1926)
- Crazy Like a Fox (1926)
- 45 Minutes from Hollywood (1926)
- Raggedy Rose (1926) - the chauffeur
- Señorita (1927)
- Eve's Love Letters (1927)
- Underworld (1927)
- With Love and Hisses (1927)
- The Gay Defender (1927)
- Pardon Us (1931)
- It's a Gift (1934)
- Rainbow's End (1935)
- Two for Tonight (1935)
- Unknown Woman (1935)
- King of Burlesque (1936)
- Behind the Mike (1937)
- Boys of the City (1940)
- One Night in the Tropics (1940)
- Too Many Blondes (1941)
