= Roy Randolph =

Roy Beverley Randolph, MBE was Dean of Johannesburg from 1952 until 1958.

He was educated at Virginia Theological Seminary and ordained in 1932 to serve with the Indian Ecclesiastical Establishment at Delhi. An American, he became a British citizen in 1940. He was a chaplain to the Forces during World War II. When peace returned he was a chaplain in Estoril then Naples.
