= The Mad Monster =

1942 film by Sam Newfield

- Theatrical release poster
- Directed by: Sam Newfield
- Screenplay by: Fred Myton
- Produced by: Sigmund Neufeld
- Starring: Johnny Downs; George Zucco; Anne Nagel
- Cinematography: Jack Greenhalgh
- Edited by: Holbrook N. Todd
- Music by: David Chudnow
- Production company: Producers Releasing Corporation
- Distributed by: Producers Releasing Corporation
- Release date: May 15, 1942
- Running time: 77 minutes
- Country: United States
- Language: English

The Mad Monster is a 1942 American black and white horror film, produced and distributed by "Poverty Row" studio Producers Releasing Corporation. The film stars George Zucco, Glenn Strange, Johnny Downs, and Anne Nagel.

The film's storyline concerns discredited mad scientist Dr. Lorenzo Cameron who plots to kill his colleagues one-by-one using a secret formula that transforms his simple-minded gardener Petro into a murderous wolfman.

== Plot ==
On a fog-bound moonlight night, a wolf howls in a swamp. In his nearby laboratory, Dr. Lorenzo Cameron draws blood from a caged wolf. Secured to a table is Dr. Cameron's simpleminded but strong gardener, Petro, who is to be the subject of the doctor's experiment. Cameron injects a serum made from a wolf's blood into the cooperative Petro, who loses consciousness, grows fur and fangs, and awakens after he has transformed into a wolfman.

Cameron turns to an empty table, visualizing his former colleagues sitting there; the four professors dismissed his theory that wolf blood transfusions could be used to give a human being wolf-like traits. He recalls how the scientific community, the press, and the public joined in a resounding chorus of ridicule that finally cost him his position at the university.

Addressing the four spectral professors, Cameron declares, "Right now, we're at war, at war with an enemy that produces a horde that strikes with a ferocious fanaticism". Cameron proposes giving wolfman traits to soldiers in order to help win the war. When the professors scoff, Cameron says to them that his proposal doesn't really matter; he is going to have his wolfman kill them one-by-one. For the time being, however, he administers an antidote that transforms Petro back to normal; Petro remembers nothing.

The following night, Cameron injects Petro again and sends him into the swamp. As a wolfman, he enters a nearby home and kills a little girl. Hearing about the child's death, Cameron knows his formulation works. Because of this, he proceeds to eliminate his former colleagues. He begins by setting up elaborate encounters in which Petro, left alone with each scientist, makes his wolfman transformation. The more times this happens, however, the more unpredictable Petro becomes while killing them.

Cameron's daughter Lenora is romantically involved with Tom Gregory, a newspaper reporter investigating the death of the little girl. As the professors are killed, Gregory begins to suspect that Cameron is behind the murders.

The principals arrive at the Cameron home as a large thunderstorm begins. A bolt of lightning suddenly strikes, setting Cameron's laboratory on fire. Lenora and Tom encounter an agitated Petro, now in his wolfman form, but are able to escape from the spreading fire. The transformed Petro suddenly turns on Cameron and kills him as the raging fire brings down the house on both of them.

== Cast ==
Cast adapted from the book Poverty Row Horrors!

- Johnny Downs as Tom Gregory
- George Zucco as Dr. Lorenzo Cameron
- Anne Nagel as Lenora Cameron
- Glenn Strange as Petro
- Sarah Padden as Grandmother
- Gordon De Main as Prof. Fitzgerald
- Mae Busch as Susan
- Reginald Barlow as Prof. Warwick
- Robert Strange as Prof. Blaine
- Henry Hall as Country Doctor
- Ed Cassidy as Father
- Eddie Holden as Jed Harper
- John Elliott as Prof. Hatfield
- Slim Whitaker as Policeman
- Gil Patric as Lieutenant Detective

== Production ==
The Mad Monster began filming on March 19, 1942 at Chadwich Studios. Although sources such as Phil Hardy's The Encyclopedia of Horror Movies stated the film was shot in five days, The Hollywood Reporter production charts and Variety indicate that shooting required two weeks.

== Release ==
The Mad Monster was released on May 15, 1942. The film was re-released by PRC in 1945 as a double feature with The Devil Bat. The film was banned in the United Kingdom until the 1950s. According to British film historian Phil Hardy, the film "shocked the British censor enough to ban it until 1952, and even then to insist that it should be accompanied by a disclaimer on the matter of blood transfusions".

== Reception ==
From contemporary reviews, a review in The Hollywood Reporter praised the film, stating that PRC had "released a thriller-diller that can stand up with the best of such product on the market." The review praised Sam Newfield's directing as "suspenseful" as well as praising the settings and photography and said that "Glenn Strange gives a top grade presence to the bewildered monster." "Eddy" of Variety declared the film had a "childish, almost naïve attempt to inject horror" and that the dialogue and situations were "strung over." Eddy found Anne Nagel and George Zucco as "satisfactory" while Strange was "properly horrible as the beast-man." Wanda Hale of the New York Daily News gave the film a one and a half star rating, summarizing that the film was about as effective as the blood transfusion within the film.

From retrospective reviews, Joe Dante listed the film in his list of the 50 worst horror films ever in 1962 in Famous Monsters of Filmland magazine, remarking that Zucco, Nagel and Johnny Downs were "awful and so was the plot." William K. Everson in his book More Classics of the Horror Film declared the film "a disaster." Tom Weaver wrote in his book Poverty Row Horrors! that the film featured "tired cliches" and was "one of those uniquely bad films that is difficult to dislike."

== See also ==
- List of films in the public domain in the United States
