= George B. French =

American actor (1883–1961)

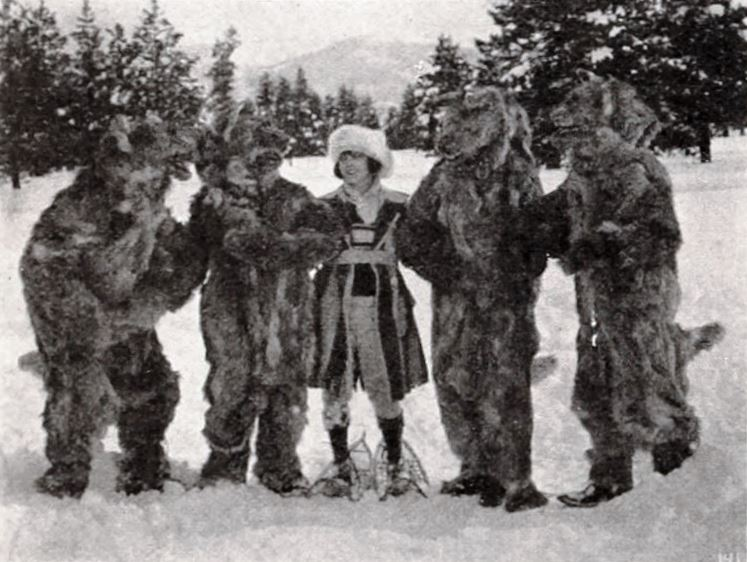
- French playing a wolf in the comedy short Cold Feet (1922)
- Born: April 14, 1883; Storm Lake, Iowa, US
- Died: June 9, 1961 (aged 78); Hollywood, California, US
- Years active: 1915-1943

George B. French (April 14, 1883 – June 9, 1961) was an American film actor. He appeared in more than 90 films between the mid-1910s and early 1940s.

== Selected filmography ==
- Wanted: A Leading Lady (1915)
- Tarzan of the Apes (1918)
- The Romance of Tarzan (1918)
- The Adventures of Tarzan (1921)
- Tire Trouble (1924)
- Commencement Day (1924)
- Reckless Romance (1924)
- Wandering Husbands (1924)
- Charley's Aunt (1925)
- Bashful Buccaneer (1925)
- Boys Will Be Joys (1925)
- The Snob Buster (1925)
- Thundering Fleas (1926)
- Red Hot Leather (1926)
- Shivering Spooks (1926)
- Lazy Lightning (1926)
- Horse Shoes (1927)
- Ten Years Old (1927)
- The Lost Limited (1927)
- One Glorious Scrap (1927)
- The Battle of the Century (1927)
- The Smile Wins (1928)
- The Black Pearl (1928)
- Barnum & Ringling, Inc. (1928)
- Won in the Clouds (1928)
- The Sawdust Paradise (1928)
- Man on the Flying Trapeze (1935)
- Way Down East (1935)
- Shakedown (1936)
