= Johnny Downs =

American actor (1913–1994)

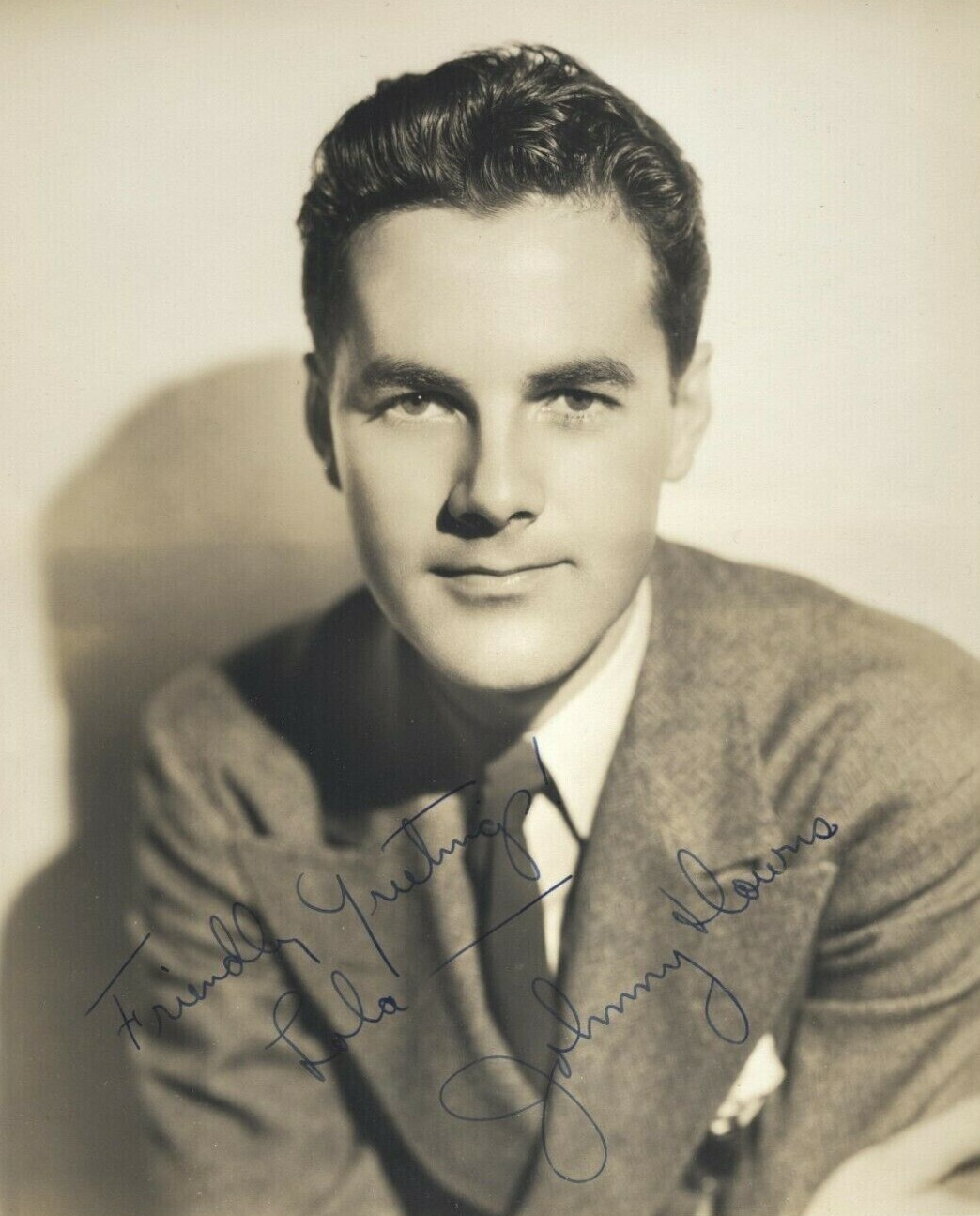
- Downs in the 1930s
- Born: John Morey Downs; October 10, 1913; Brooklyn, New York, U.S.
- Died: June 6, 1994 (aged 80); Coronado, California, U.S.
- Occupations: Actor; singer; dancer
- Years active: 1923–1968
- Spouse(s): June Downs (m. 19??)
- Children: 5

John Morey Downs (October 10, 1913 – June 6, 1994) was an American actor, singer and dancer. He began his career as a child actor, most notably as Johnny in the Our Gang short comedy film series from 1923 to 1926. He remained active in films, television and theatre through the early 1960s.

== Early life ==
Downs was born in New York City. His father was Lt. Morey Downs, an aviator with the U.S. Navy. When he was eight, the family moved to San Diego due to his father's transfer. Johnny's mother took him to Hollywood for an audition with the Hal Roach Studios. He appeared in a silent film; then was cast as Johnny in the Our Gang series, where he was a regular from 1923 until 1927 and appeared in 24 episodes.

== Adult career ==
Outgrowing the Our Gang series at the age of 14, Downs and fellow Our Gang alumni Mary Kornman and Scooter Lowry performed vaudeville acts.

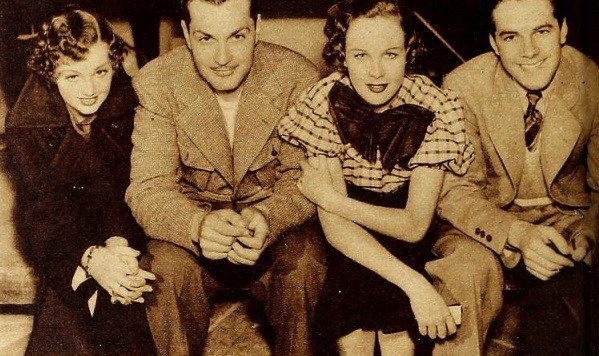
Arline Judge, Kent Taylor, Wendy Barrie, and Johnny Downs in College Scandal (1935)

In 1934 he returned to Hollywood and landed a small part in the musical Babes in Toyland. He found his niche in the "college musical" movies of the late 1930s, starting with College Scandal (1935) and College Holiday (1936). With his boy-next-door good looks, he was often cast as a team captain or a cheerleader. Other movie musicals followed, ending in 1944 with What a Man!. He had a notable cameo in the 1945 film Rhapsody in Blue where he danced to Robert Alda's piano playing of "Swanee". For the remainder of the 1940s and the early 1950s he had a few bit parts in films, including Cruisin' Down the River. He spent most of his time on the stage in summer stock and on Broadway, scoring a hit in Are You With It?. He appeared in nearly 100 movies.

== The Johnny Downs Show ==
In 1949 Downs was co-host of Manhattan Showcase, a 15-minute talent-discovery program on CBS television. He settled in Coronado, California where he sold real estate and became a respected amateur tennis player. From 1953 to 1968 he hosted an after-school kids' television show, The Johnny Downs Show, on Channel 10 (call letters KFSD until 1961, subsequently KOGO). The theme started as an airport hangar with Downs playing a former World War II pilot, "Johnny Jet". Between reruns of The Little Rascals, Downs entertained and informed studio audiences and viewers. Later, it was trains, and he was shown getting off or on a locomotive at the show's beginning and end. As the show changed to feature more Popeye cartoons, his theme changed from being a train engineer to being a boat captain at the San Diego harbour. Since one of the show's sponsors was Golden Arrow Dairy, Downs was regularly featured as a superimposed miniature dancer on top of an old-style milk bottle. Children were welcome to come to the KOGO studio and watch the program being broadcast. When each show concluded, Downs waved to the viewing room and the visitors entered the studio. He let kids put on his coat and cap and mimic his opening "Howdy, howdy, howdy! Good to see ya! Good to see ya!" There was briefly a morning show where he invited students to come and compete in math quizzes. During this time he appeared as the Tin Woodsman in the San Diego Starlight Opera production of The Wizard Of Oz.

== Theatre ==
According to Carleton Carpenter's autobiography, Downs worked as a choreographer in the theatre in the late 1950s on a production called Lock Up Your Daughters. He "did our dances, and they were really foolish. It wasn't choreography; I don't know what it was. I do know it wasn't good, and it became a great source of amusement for all the company—behind Johnny's back, of course, but we were about a subtle as a bus wreck. It bonded the cast completely together."

== Death ==
Downs died of cancer on June 6, 1994, in Coronado, California at the age of 80. He and wife June had five children: Mary, Claudia, John Jr., Mollie and Maureen.

== Partial filmography ==
- Circus Fever (1925, Short) - Johnny
- Dog Days (1925, Short) - Rich Kid
- The Love Bug (1925, Short) - Johnny
- Ask Grandma (1925, Short) - Johnnie
- Thundering Fleas (1926, Short) - Johnny
- 45 Minutes from Hollywood (1926, Short) - Himself (archive footage) (uncredited)
- Seeing the World (1927, Short) - Johnny
- Jesse James (1927) - Jesse James as a boy (uncredited)
- Chicken Feed (1927, Short) - Prof. Presto Misterio
- The Valley of the Giants (1927) - Bryce, as a Boy (uncredited)
- The Crowd (1928) - John - Age 12 (uncredited)
- The Trail of '98 (1928) - Mother's Boy
- Babes in Toyland (1934) - Little Boy Blue (uncredited)
- So Red the Rose (1935) - Wounded Yankee Corporal
- College Scandal (1935) - Paul Gedney
- The Virginia Judge (1935) - Bob Stuart
- Coronado (1935) - Johnny Marvin
- Everybody's Old Man (1936) - Tommy Sampson
- The First Baby (1936) - Johnny Ellis
- The Arizona Raiders (1936) - Lonesome Alonzo Q. Mulhall
- Pigskin Parade (1936) - Chip Carson
- College Holiday (1936) - Johnny Jones
- Clarence (1937) - Bobbie
- Turn Off the Moon (1937) - Terry Keith
- Blonde Trouble (1937) - Fred Stevens
- Thrill of a Lifetime (1937) - Stanley
- Algiers (1938) - Pierrot
- Hunted Men (1938) - Frank Martin
- Hold That Co-ed (1938) - Dink
- Swing, Sister, Swing (1938) - Johnny Bennett
- First Offenders (1939) - Fred Gray
- Bad Boy (1939) - John Fraser
- Hawaiian Nights (1939) - Ted Hartley
- Parents on Trial (1939) - Don Martin
- Laugh It Off (1939) - Stephen 'Steve' Hannis
- A Child Is Born (1939) - Johnny Norton
- I Can't Give You Anything But Love, Baby (1940) - Robert Lee 'Bob' Gunther
- Sing, Dance, Plenty Hot (1940) - Johnny
- Melody and Moonlight (1940) - Danny O'Brian
- Slightly Tempted (1940) - Jimmy Duncan
- Honeymoon for Three (1941) - Chester T. Farrington III
- Adam Had Four Sons (1941) - David Stoddard (older)
- Redhead (1941) - Ted Brown
- Sing Another Chorus (1941) - Andy Peyton
- Moonlight in Hawaii (1941) - Pete Fleming
- All-American Co-Ed (1941) - Bob Sheppard / Bobbie DeWolfe
- Freckles Comes Home (1942) - 'Freckles' Winslow
- The Mad Monster (1942) - Tom Gregory
- Behind the Eight Ball (1942) - Danny
- Adventures of the Flying Cadets (1943, Serial) - Cadet Danny Collins
- Campus Rhythm (1943) - 'Scoop' Davis
- Harvest Melody (1943) - Tommy Nelson
- What a Man! (1944) - Henry M. Burrows
- Trocadero (1944) - Johnny Edwards
- Twilight on the Prairie (1944) - Bucky
- Forever Yours (1945) - Ricky
- Rhapsody in Blue (1945) - Dancer
- The Kid from Brooklyn (1946) - Master of Ceremonies
- Square Dance Jubilee (1949) - Himself
- Hills of Oklahoma (1950) - Square Dance Caller
- Call Me Madam (1953) - Cameraman (uncredited)
- The Girls of Pleasure Island (1953) - Marine (uncredited)
- Column South (1953) - Lt. Posick
- Cruisin' Down the River (1953) - Young Jack
- The Caddy (1953) - Shipping Clerk (uncredited)
- Here Come the Girls (1953) - Bob (uncredited) (final film role)

== Broadway credits ==
- Hold It! (1948)
- Are You With It? (1945–1946)
- Ragged Army (1934)
- Growing Pains (1933)
- Strike Me Pink (1933)

== Bibliography ==
- John Holmstrom, The Moving Picture Boy: An International Encyclopaedia from 1895 to 1995, Norwich, Michael Russell, 1996, p. 60.
- Carleton Carpenter The Absolute Joy of Work: From Vermont to Broadway, Hollywood, and Damn Near 'Round the World, United States, Bear Manor Media, 2016, p. 203.
