= Lyle Tayo =

American actress (1889–1971)

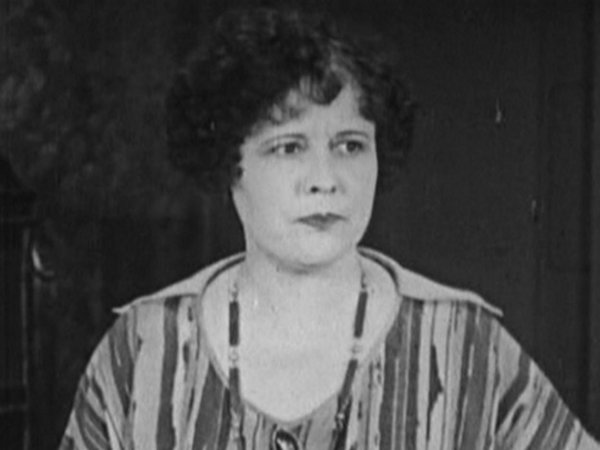
- Tayo in Yes, Yes, Nanette (1925)
- Born: Lyle Minnie Shipman; January 19, 1889; Elmdale, Kansas, U.S.
- Died: May 2, 1971 (aged 82); Hollywood, California, U.S.
- Burial place: Valhalla Memorial Park Cemetery
- Other name: Lyle Barton
- Occupation: Actress
- Years active: 1921–1948

Lyle Tayo (born Lyle Minnie Shipman; January 19, 1889 – May 2, 1971), a.k.a. Lyle Barton, was an American film actress who appeared in more than 50 films between 1921 and 1948, appearing in many short comedies at the Hal Roach Studios, several in support of Laurel and Hardy. Born in Elmdale, Kansas, she and her elder sister, Birleen (or Birdeen), were raised in Kansas City, Missouri. Tayo died in 1971, aged 82, and is interred in Valhalla Memorial Park Cemetery.

== Filmography ==
Year	Title	Role	Notes
1921	Among Those Present		Short, Uncredited
1924	Tire Trouble	Mme. La Rue	Short
1925	Yes, Yes, Nanette	Nanette	
1926	Thundering Fleas	Pedestrian without fleas	Short
1926	Crazy Like a Fox	Nurse	Short, Uncredited
1927	Baby Brother	Party guest	Short, Uncredited
1927	Call of the Cuckoo	Guest	Short, Uncredited
1927	The Battle of the Century	Woman at window	Short, Uncredited
1928	Their Purple Moment	Mrs. Hardy	Short
1928	Should Married Men Go Home?	Lady golfer	Short, Uncredited
1928	Two Tars	Motorist	Short
1928	The Spanking Age	Stepmother	Short
1929	Noisy Noises	Joe's mother	Short
1929	Big Business	Woman	Short, Uncredited
1930	Shivering Shakespeare	Chubby's mother	Short, Uncredited
1931	One Good Turn	A Community Player	Short, Uncredited
1931	Dogs Is Dogs	Wheezer's aunt	Short, Uncredited
1932	Readin' and Writin'	Breezy's mother	Short
1932	Choo-Choo!	Secretary	Short
1934	For Pete's Sake!	Aminuddin	Uncredited
1948	The Miracle of the Bells	Woman	Uncredited
