= Harry Spear =

American actor (1921–2006)

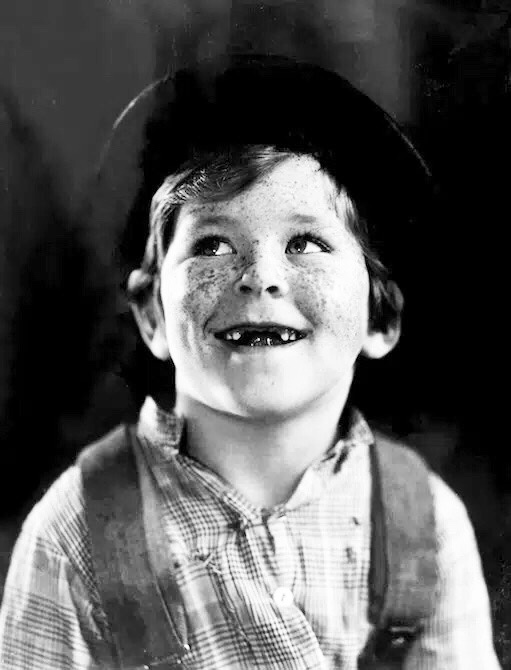
- Spear in 1927
- Born: December 16, 1921; Los Angeles, California, U.S.
- Died: September 22, 2006 (aged 84); San Diego, California, U.S.
- Other names: Ginger; Freckles; Hard-Boiled Harry
- Occupation: Child actor
- Years active: 1927–1929
- Spouse: Thelma Spear (m 1957-2006)

Harry Sherman Bonner (December 16, 1921 – September 22, 2006), also known as Harry Spear, was an American child actor and vaudevillian. He was notable for appearing in the Our Gang short subjects series from 1927 to 1929 and Educational Pictures shorts from 1925 to 1927.

Notable for appearing in a total of 31 Our Gang comedies, Spear also appeared in other shorts before his time in the Gang. He gained recognition for his ginger hair and freckles, as both of his well-known nicknames. After leaving the film business, Spear started in vaudeville.

== Early life ==
Born on December 16, 1921, on Los Angeles, California, Harry was born to Joseph Francis Bonner and Louise Dorothy Spear.

He had a grandmother, Bertha Spear. Spear's legal surname, Bonner, was not used in documents like contracts, with his mother's maiden name, Spear being used instead. This was used after his parents divorced.

== Acting career ==
=== Early acting career ===
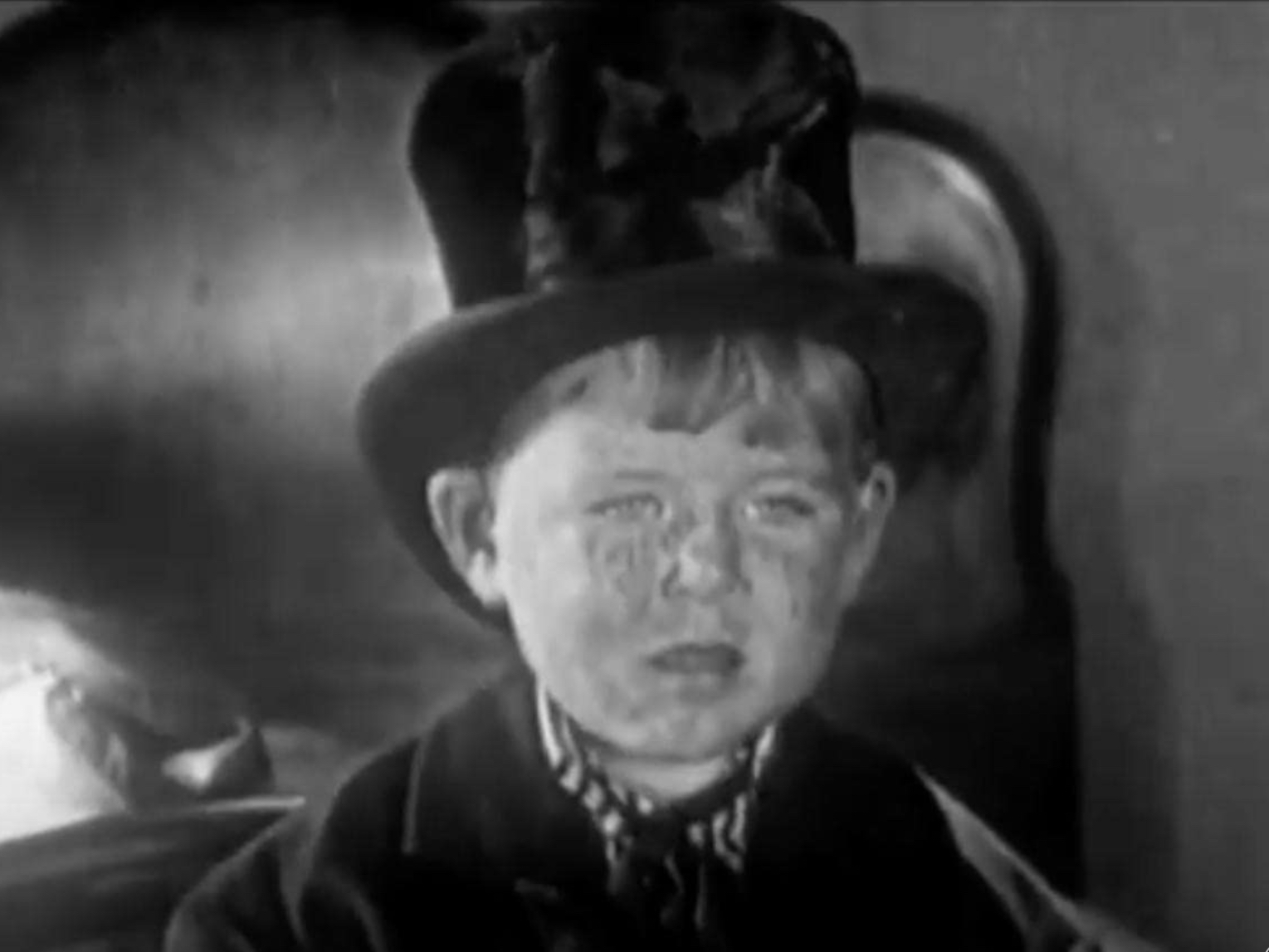
Spear in Raisin' Cain (1926).

Before joining the wildly popular Our Gang series, Spear made appearances in several Juvenile Comedies as supporting character Ginger. He also appeared in Educational Pictures comedias, like the Tuxedo Comedies, and in a couple Smith Family shorts. Though Spear slowly was given a lead role over time, Spear was often foreshadowed by "Big Boy" Malcolm Sebastian, the leading and youngest character in the series. Even though Maltin, Leonard and Bann state that he appeared in a few Buck Jones westerns, Spear actually appeared in one, The Flying Horseman.

=== Our Gang ===
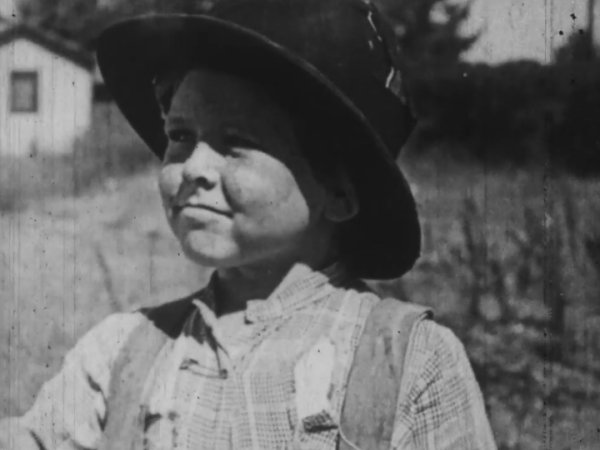
Spear in The Old Wallop (1927).

Spear made his first appearance in the Our Gang series at the age of five in the film Chicken Feed. Spear first made small appearances as an extra during mid-1927. After a void was left by Scooter Lowry after his contract expired, Spear took over the "tough kid" role, often targeting Allen "Farina" Hoskins, though it would not be until 1928 when Spear made appearances as a leader. Spear was a popular member of the gang during the late silent era (1927–1929), often donning an oversized bowler hat. At the dawn of the sound era, newcomer Jackie Cooper took over the role as either the leader or tough guy in the gang, replacing Spear, though Spear did make a few sound appearances. Spear's final Our Gang film would be Bouncing Babies.

== Vaudeville ==
After departing the series, Spear briefly entered vaudeville, entertaining audiences with a dancing and monologue routine. Joining in 1930, Spear was dubbed as Freckles and known for his bad boy character. He was one of the young vaudeville stars that took dance instruction from Roy Randolph around September of that year. Spear "told several amusing stories" at a meeting of the Rotary Club in Waynesboro, Virginia, in April 1932. In Christmas 1933, twelve-year-old Spear would be offered a contract for a series similar to that of Horatio Alger, however, it was never completed. In the mid-1940s, though, he had left the entertainment industry and severed ties with his former Our Gang alumni.

== Lost Rascal ==
Spear's whereabouts after the 1940s remained a mystery for over half a century. However, several diligent Our Gang fans attempted to track down Spear in 1995. Residing in San Diego, California, at the time, Spear (who went by his legal name of Harry Bonner) continually denied being the "Harry Spear" of Our Gang fame for unknown reasons, despite overwhelming evidence to the contrary From U.S. Naval records, it was found that Harry Spear served as a Chief Petty Officer in the U.S. Navy during World War II, the Korean War and Vietnam War.

== Death ==
Spear died of kidney cancer on September 22, 2006, in San Diego, California. He was 84 years of age.

== Personal life ==
Spear was managed by his grandmother Bertha Spear, who was also his legal guardian. Some name confusion existed for a while because of a different actor named Harry Spear, who appeared in some bit roles in several movies in the 1960s.

== See also ==
- Our Gang personnel
