= Clifton Young =

American actor (1917–1951)

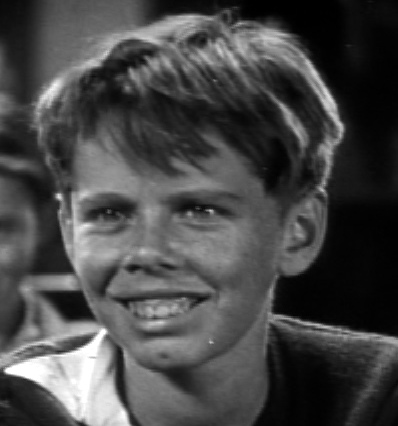
- Young as "Bonedust" in his first sound film, School's Out (1930)
- Born: Robert Howard Young; September 15, 1917; Schenectady, New York, U.S.
- Died: September 10, 1951 (aged 33); Los Angeles, California, U.S.
- Occupation: Actor
- Years active: 1925–1951

Robert Howard Young (September 15, 1917 – September 10, 1951) professionally known as Clifton Young, was an American film actor.

== Early years ==
Young was the son of Edward A. and Eva (Clifton) Young. His father started him in vaudeville when he was 5 years old. When he was 7, he began acting in Our Gang comedies. Young was drafted into the Army during World War II, serving in the South Pacific, as a private in the 37th Cavalry Reconnaissance Troop (Mechanized), part of the 37th Infantry Division, a division which saw action in the northern Solomons and Luzon.

== Career ==
Young played "Bonedust" in nineteen Our Gang films from 1925 to 1931, his most notable film being School's Out. As an adult, to avoid confusion with established star Robert Young, he took his mother's maiden name, Clifton, as his screen name.

Young became a contract player at Warner Bros., landing small parts in a number of 1940s film noir and western films. Notable credits include Nora Prentiss, Pursued, Possessed, Dark Passage, and Blood on the Moon.

While at Warners, Young was featured prominently in the Joe McDoakes comedy shorts. He played a variety of roles: a craven mobster in So You Want to Be a Detective, a department-store clerk in So You're Going on Vacation, and memorably as "Homer," Joe's brash, know-it-all office colleague in several McDoakes reels.

One of Young's last films was the Roy Rogers western Trail of Robin Hood (1950), in which he played a sneering villain.

== Death ==
Young died on September 10, 1951, in a hotel fire that started when he fell asleep while smoking.

== Filmography ==
Year	Title	Role	Notes
1927	Three's a Crowd	Minor Role – as Bobby Young	Uncredited
1928	The Circus Kid	Boy at Orphanage	Uncredited
1931	Sidewalks of New York	Street Gang Member	Uncredited
1935	Bright Lights	Piano Player at Party	Uncredited
1936	Small Town Girl	Boy in Car in Montage	Uncredited
1936	The Lonely Trail	Murdered Rancher's Son	Uncredited
1936	Hearts in Bondage	Young man waiting to enlist	Uncredited
1936	The President's Mystery	Townsman	Uncredited
1945	The Master Key	Loft Building Henchman	Serial, Uncredited
1946	Two Guys from Milwaukee	Joe – Motorcycle Cop	Uncredited
1946	Cloak and Dagger	American Commander	Uncredited
1946	Deception	Taxi Driver	Uncredited
1947	The Unfaithful	Charlie	Voice, Uncredited
1947	Nora Prentiss	Policeman arresting Truck Driver	Uncredited
1947	That Way with Women	Irate Baseball Fan	Uncredited
1947	Pursued	The Sergeant	
1947	Possessed	Interne	
1947	Dark Passage	Baker	
1947	Always Together	Reporter	Uncredited
1947	My Wild Irish Rose	Joe Brennan	
1948	The Treasure of the Sierra Madre	Flophouse Bum	Uncredited
1948	Two Guys from Texas	Announcer	Uncredited
1948	Blood on the Moon	Joe Shotten	
1948	Whiplash	Gunman	Uncredited
1949	My Dream Is Yours	Schwab's Counterman	Voice, Uncredited
1949	Illegal Entry	Billy Rafferty	
1949	Calamity Jane and Sam Bass	Link	
1949	Abandoned	Eddie	
1950	Bells of Coronado	Ross	
1950	Backfire	Cabby	Uncredited
1950	Borderline	Suspect Questioned by Whittaker	Uncredited
1950	A Woman of Distinction	Chet – Photographer	Uncredited
1950	Salt Lake Raiders	Luke Condor	
1950	Union Station	Ambulance Driver	Uncredited
1950	The Return of Jesse James	Bob Ford	
1950	Trail of Robin Hood	Mitch McCall	
1951	Up Front	Clerk	Uncredited
1951	The Redhead and the Cowboy	Southern Spy	Uncredited
1951	Love Nest		Uncredited
1952	Zombies of the Stratosphere	Ross – Smuggler Boss	Serial, [Ch. 4], Uncredited, (final film role)
