= Jay R. Smith =

American actor and comedian (1915–2002)

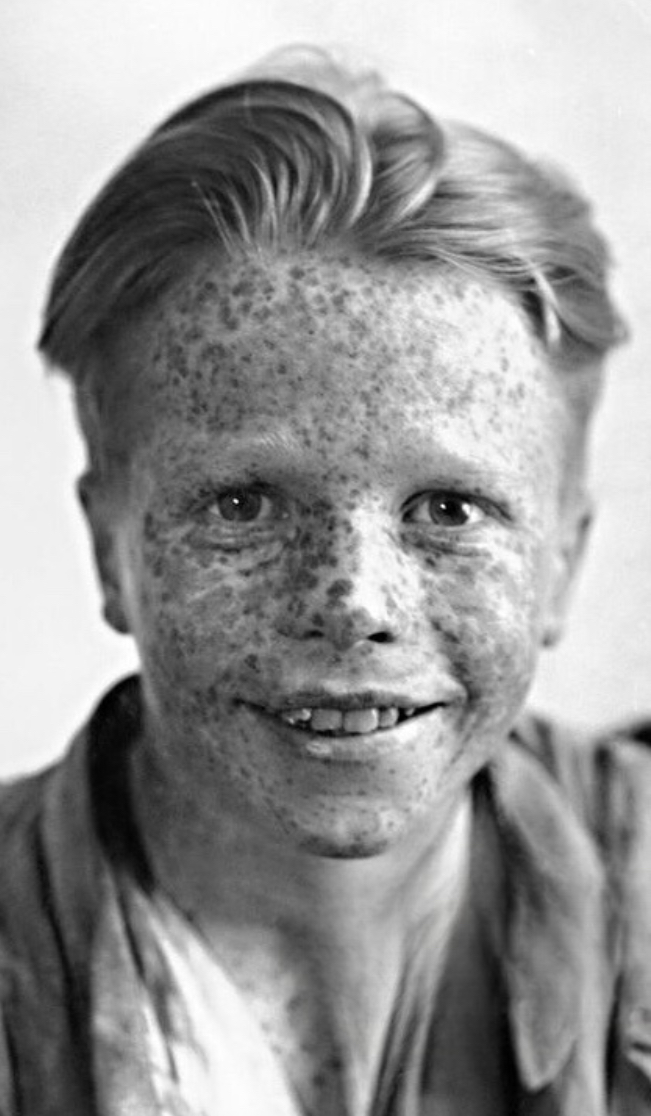
- Smith in 1927
- Born: J.R. Smith; August 29, 1915; Los Angeles, California, U.S.
- Died: c. October 5, 2002 (aged 87); Las Vegas, Nevada, U.S.
- Cause of death: Homicide by stabbing
- Other names: Turkey-egg; Speck
- Occupations: Child actor, comedian
- Years active: 1925–1931; 2002
- Family: Donnie "Beezer" Smith (brother)

Jay R. Smith (August 29, 1915 – c. October 5, 2002) was an American child actor and comedian who had a brief career appearing the Our Gang film short series during the silent Pathé era, from 1925 to 1931. He racked up appearances in 36 shorts, where he was billed as the skinny freckle-faced character "Specks". This series was syndicated to television as The Little Rascals.

== Career ==
Smith's first film in the Our Gang series was Boys Will Be Joys in 1925. He rivalled the retiring Mickey Daniels as the freckle-faced kid in the gang and continued until the silent era ended. He also appeared as himself in 45 Minutes from Hollywood (1926).

Bowing to pressure from the studio, Smith appeared in the sixth Our Gang talkie titled Moan and Groan, Inc. (1929), his only talkie. He was dissatisfied with his performance in the film and feared he would not have a successful career in talkies, he quit acting overall. He came back to appear in The Boy Friends' episode Blood and Thunder, where he was seen throwing water.

== Personal life ==
Jay R. Smith, the son of a labourer, was one of 5 siblings. His younger brother, Donnie "Beezer" Smith, appeared in the Our Gang short film Cat, Dog & Co..

According to an article in Variety in 1936, Smith was married to Gloria Narath, who provided the original voice of the Disney character Minnie Mouse, for Walt Disney Studios. He later married Mabel Florine Case, and they remained married until her death on February 1, 2002. After leaving acting, Smith, a native of Los Angeles, California, joined the U.S. Navy. He served during World War II in Guam before starting his own retail paint business and moving to Kailua, Hawaii.

== Murder ==
Smith, having retired from the retail paint business after 15 years, moved to Las Vegas, Nevada in the early 1990s.

In October 2002, aged 87, he was reported missing by his daughter. His body was found on October 5, 2002, in the desert near Las Vegas. He had died of multiple stab wounds.

52-year-old Charles Wayne Crombie (known as Wayne), a homeless man whom Smith reportedly befriended, was convicted of the murder of Smith, stealing his belongings and Visa debit card, multiple counts of fraud, and stealing his motor vehicle.

Crombie was sentenced to two consecutive life terms in prison, which he was serving at the Northern Nevada Correctional Center where he died on July 17, 2014, of which was described in press reports as a "chronic illness" at the age of 64.
