= List of cemeteries in Nevada =

This list of cemeteries in Nevada includes currently operating, historical (closed for new interments), and defunct (graves abandoned or removed) cemeteries, columbaria, and mausolea which are historical and/or notable. It does not include pet cemeteries.

== Clark County ==
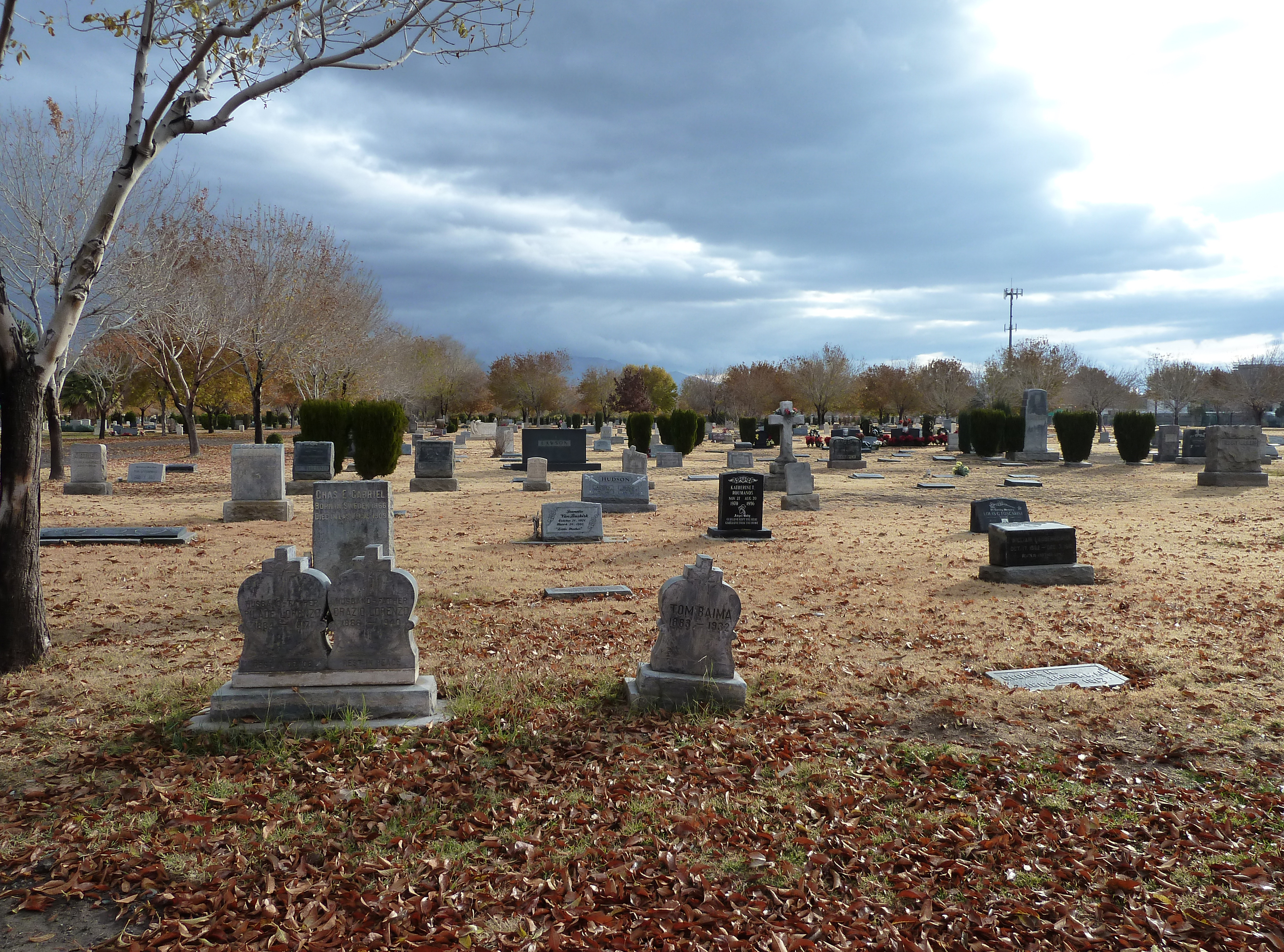
Woodlawn Cemetery, in Las Vegas

- Goodsprings Cemetery, near Jean
- Palm Mortuary Memorial Park, Henderson
- St. Thomas Memorial Cemetery, Overton; NRHP-listed
- Southern Nevada Veterans Memorial Cemetery, Boulder City
- Woodlawn Cemetery, Las Vegas; NRHP-listed

== Lander County ==
- Austin Cemetery, Austin; NRHP-listed

== Lyons County ==
- Northern Nevada Veterans Memorial Cemetery, near Fernley

== Washoe County ==
- Mountain View Cemetery, Reno

== See also ==
- List of cemeteries in the United States
- Pioneer cemetery
