= Kindig =

Kindig is a surname of German origin. Notable people with the surname include:

- Howard Kindig (born 1941), American football player
- James W. Kindig, American judge
- John M. Kindig (died 1869), Union Army officer and Medal of Honor recipient
- Richard H. Kindig (1916–2008), American photographer
- Thomas Kindig (born 1996), Austrian footballer
- Will H. Kindig (1869–1946), American politician
