= Klingbeil =

Klingbeil is a surname. Notable people with the surname include:

- Chuck Klingbeil (1965–2018), American football player
- Ike Klingbeil (1908–1995), American hockey player
- Lars Klingbeil (born 1978), German politician
- René Klingbeil (born 1981), German footballer and coach
