= Wiccans and pagans in the United States military =

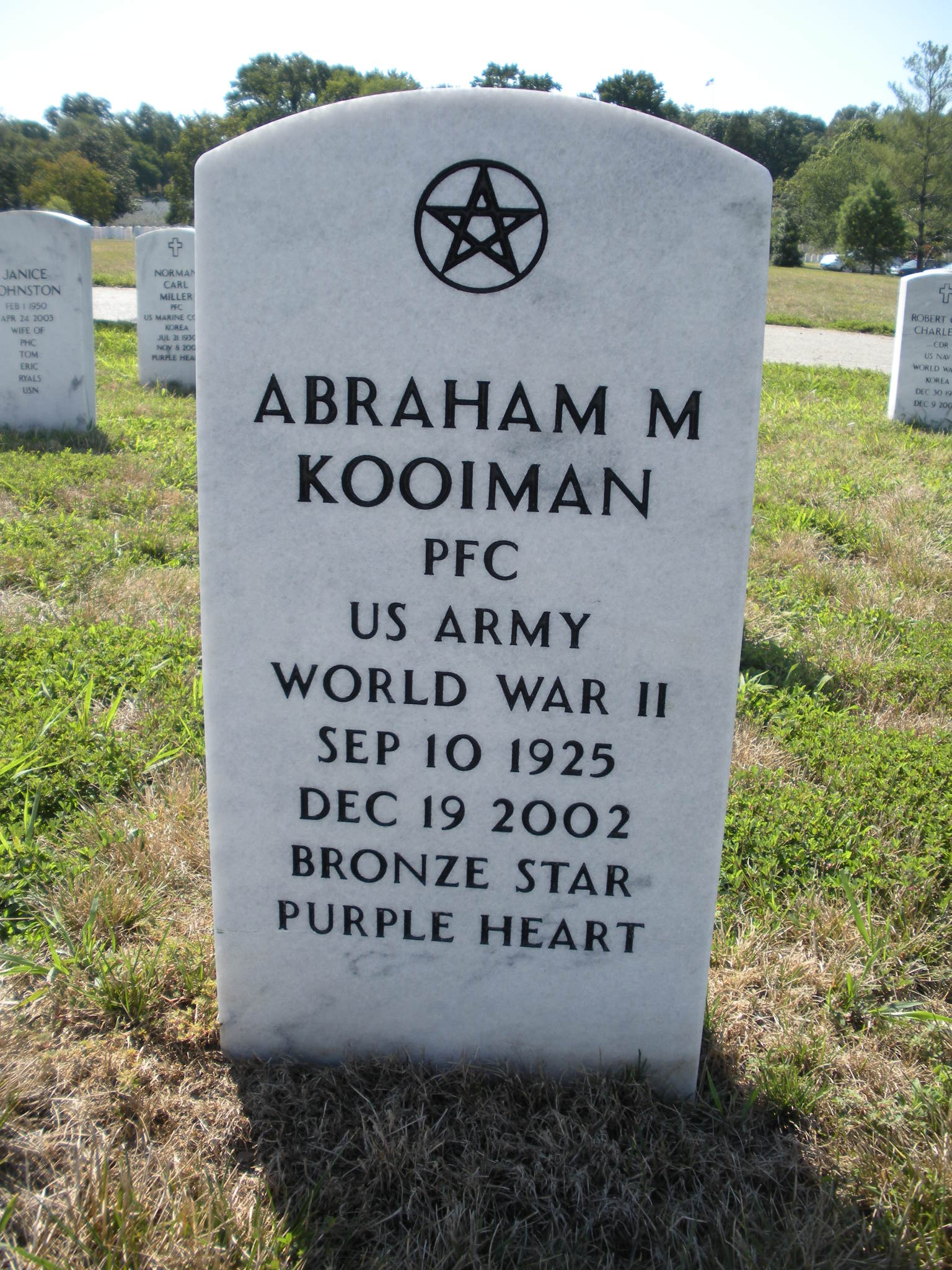
Official VA gravestone of a Wiccan servicemember

Wiccans and pagans in the United States military have, since the close of the 20th century, experienced a gradual increase in official recognition. The Wiccan pentacle is now an approved emblem for gravestones under the Veterans Administration, achieved in 2007 following legal action regarding the grave of Wiccan soldier Patrick Stewart. In 2011, the United States Air Force Academy dedicated an $80,000 "outdoor worship center" for "Earth-based religions" such as paganism and traditional Native American religions. As of 2022, there is no provision for official recognition of Wiccan or pagan chaplains.

A broadly neutral depiction of Wicca for a military audience is found in the 1990 version of the Department of the Army's Religious Requirements and Practices of Certain Selected Groups: A Handbook for Chaplains.

== Demographics ==
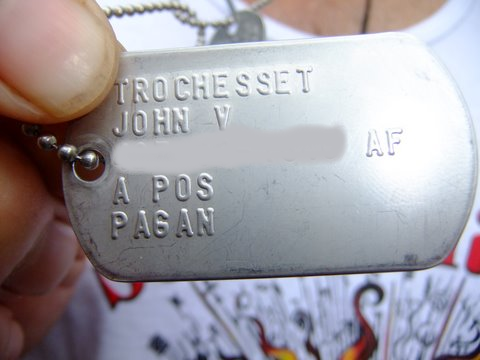
Air Force dogtags with "Pagan" marking

The Navy and Army do not track numbers for Wiccans and pagans, but a 2007 Pentagon count showed over 1,500 self-identified Wiccans in the Air Force and 350 in the Marines. Pagan advocates in 2012 estimated the military's total pagan population at 10,000-20,000, noting that some adherents may not list their affiliation on official forms, and that in the past "no preference" or "other" were the only applicable labels available.

The Los Angeles Times noted in 2011 that only three of the Air Force Academy's 4,300 cadets identified as pagans.

== Controversies ==
In 1999, in response to a statement by Representative Bob Barr (R-GA) regarding Wiccan gatherings on military bases, the Free Congress Foundation called for U.S. citizens to not enlist or reenlist in the U.S. Army until the Army terminated the on-base freedoms of religion, speech and assembly for Wiccan soldiers. Though this movement died a "quiet death", on 24 June 1999, then-Governor George W. Bush stated on a television news program, "I don't think witchcraft is a religion and I wish the military would take another look at this and decide against it."

== Chaplain Larsen case ==
U.S. Army Chaplain Captain Don Larsen was dismissed from his post in Iraq in 2006 after changing his religious affiliation from Pentecostal Christianity to Wicca and applying to become the first Wiccan military chaplain. His potential new endorser, the Sacred Well Congregation in Texas, was not recognized as an endorsement organization by the military, and upon hearing of his conversion, his prior endorser, the Chaplaincy of Full Gospel Churches, revoked its endorsement. Due to this the U.S. Army was required to dismiss him from chaplaincy.

== Headstone emblems ==
Emblem of Belief 37 – Wicca (pentacle)

Prior to 2007, the United States Department of Veterans Affairs (VA) did not allow the use of the pentacle as an approved emblem of belief on headstones and markers in military cemeteries. This policy was changed in April 2007 to settle a lawsuit. In the two years following, "more than a dozen" official gravestones received the pentacle.

The VA also added the hammer of Thor to the list of approved emblems in May 2013, and the awen in 2017.

== Addition to religious codes ==
In 2017 a major update to the U.S. Army religious codes added several pagan, Wiccan, Druid, and Heathen classifications to the possible personal identification choices.

== Religious accommodations ==
In 2018, as a response to the Department of the Army's 2017 ruling to allow the growth of beards in accordance with religious traditions as an exception to Army Regulation 670-1, a soldier assigned to the 795th Military Police Battalion was given authorization to grow a beard in observance of his heathen faith. This ruling was seen as unusual given the fact that beards are not required in the Heathen religion, unlike religions such as Sikhism.
