= Burnis McCloud =

Burnis "Mac" McCloud (May 5, 1908 – December 4, 1990) was an American photographer. McCloud did most of his work in Denver, Colorado. The work created over his lifetime contained documentation of daily life, the African-American community, and special events. He produced over 100,000 negatives and 3,000 prints over the course of his career. Today, his collection is housed in the archives of the Denver Public Library.

== Early life ==
McCloud was born in Birmingham, Alabama, in 1908 to Reverend F.W. McCloud (a pastor at Evnon Baptist Church in Altoona) and Mamie McCloud. Burnis became interested in photography around the age of ten, when he found spare camera parts in a junkyard. He took the parts to the owner of a local photography shop, who told Burnis he would teach the boy photography if he could put the camera together.

McCloud graduated from Industrial High School (today Parker High School) in Birmingham in 1928. Two years later, at the age of 22, he moved to Denver, Colorado.

== Early career ==
Once in Denver, McCloud found a job as a custodian at the Colorado State Capitol. McCloud had brought his photographic equipment westward and his interest in the hobby persisted. Even as he married and started a family, he continued to take pictures in his spare time. He built a darkroom in his home's basement in Five Points.

In 1939, McCloud entered two photography contests: one sponsored by the New York World's Fair and one by the Marshall Fields Store in Chicago. He won both contests with his entry "The Smiling Cowboy." "The Smiling Cowboy" featured his grinning four-year-old son, Burnis McCloud, Jr., wearing a ten-gallon cowboy hat.

McCloud's photography and job at the Capitol were both put on hold during World War II, when he went to fight in the Pacific. Upon his return, he resumed his work at the Capitol as a custodian. McCloud took advantage of the G.I. Bill by enrolling at the University of Denver, seeking pursuing a degree in photography with elements of public relations and advertising. He graduated with his Bachelor of Arts degree in 1950.

During this time, McCloud's reputation as a photographer grew. He documented the milestone events of friends and acquaintances such as weddings and funerals, but was also able to use his connections at the Capitol to capture images of Colorado governors, and even presidents such as Dwight D. Eisenhower and Harry S. Truman.

McCloud lost his custodian job in 1952 when the Capitol began contracting custodial work to a private company. He decided to pursue his photographic career full-time.

== Photography career ==
In all, McCloud's career spanned over thirty years and left behind a large collection of photographs. After his death, the Rocky Mountain News quoted his wife Marsaline saying "Mac worked all the time[...]It wasn't unusual for him to have three or four weddings on a weekend. Sometimes there'd be three weddings on a Saturday afternoon and a cocktail reception at night.''

McCloud's subjects continued to range from the everyday to the extraordinary. He took photos in places such as dentists' offices and conventions. James Meadow writes that McCloud covered "weddings, debutante balls, church functions, beautician conventions, barbershop get-togethers, the arrival of everybody from Mahalia Jackson to Jesse Jackson to Martin Luther King." At a time when local news outlets would not cover the black community's social and cultural events, McCloud's prolific collection of photographs shows what life was like for Denver's African-American community for nearly half-a-century. McCloud also published photos in Denver's leading African-American newspaper, the Denver Weekly News, in a regular feature called "McCloud's Elite."

McCloud retired in the 1980s after his eyesight began to fail due to complications from diabetes. He died in 1990, and is interred at Fort Logan National Cemetery.

== Personal life ==
McCloud was involved in several social organizations. He was a member of fraternal organizations such as the Masons, Shriners, and Owl Club of Denver, as well as the Kappa Alpha Psi fraternity. He was also active in the Civil Rights Movement. In addition to photographing several important civil rights leaders, he was a member of the NAACP and the Urban League. He was a member of the Zion Baptist Church.

McCloud was married three times. He married his first wife, Claudine Smith, in 1933. The couple's son, Burnis Jr., was born in 1934. In 1952, he married social worker Ellen Moose. Their union produced a daughter, Adonica Louise. In 1958, McCloud married his third wife, Marsaline Estes. The two remained married until McCloud's death in 1990. She donated his collection to the Denver Public Library.
