= Austin Cemetery =

- U.S. National Register of Historic Places
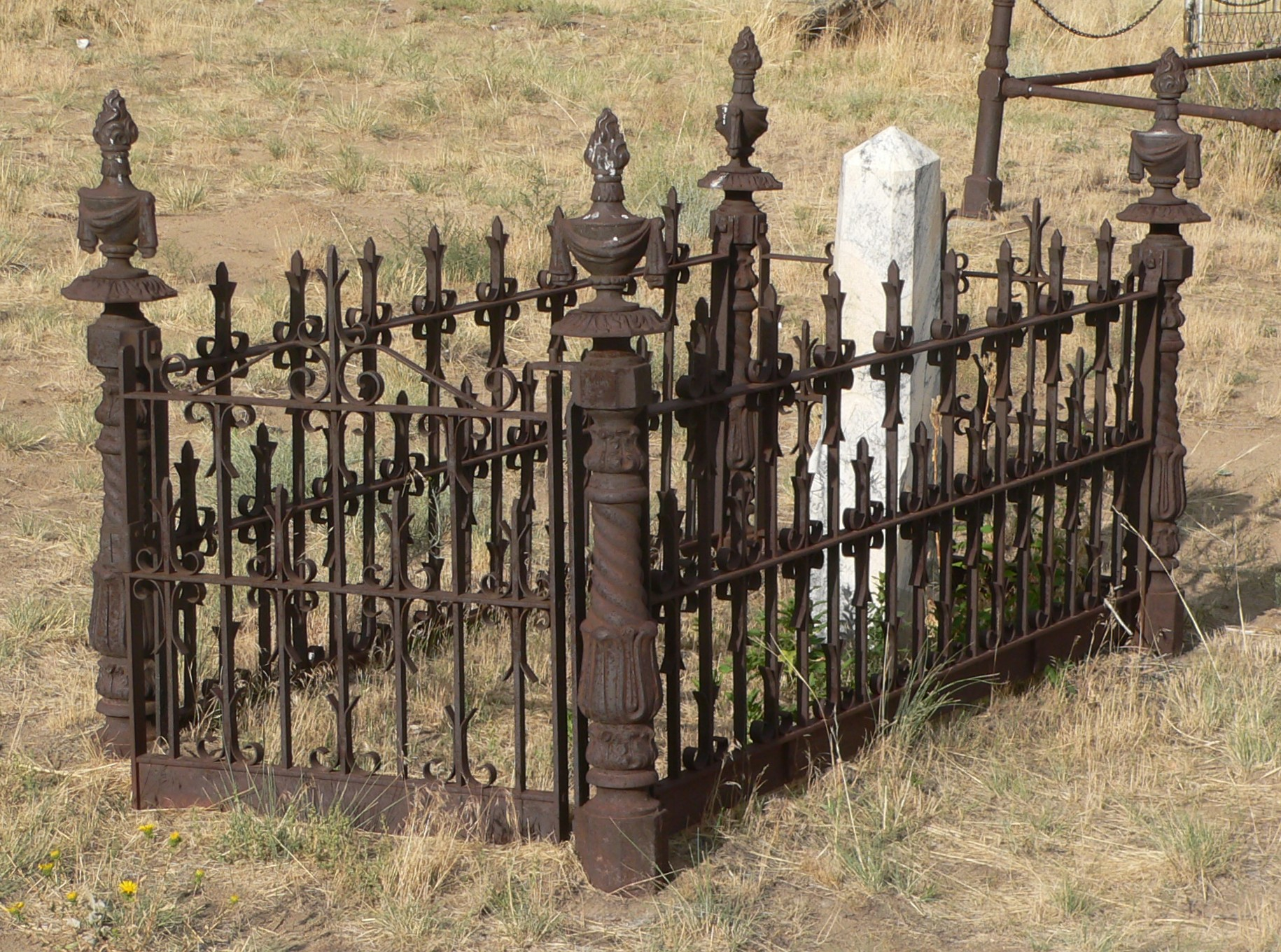
- Grave with enclosure in Masonic section of cemetery

- Location within Nevada Location within the United States
- Location: N and S sides of US 50 near jct. with SR 305, Austin, Lander County, Nevada
- Coordinates: 39°30′3″N 117°5′7″W
- Area: 5 acres (2.0 ha)
- Built: 1863
- Built by: Stewart Iron Works; et al.
- NRHP reference No.: 03000753
- Added to NRHP: August 14, 2003

The Austin Cemetery, is a 5-acre (2.0 ha) cemetery whose first known burials were in 1863 in Austin, Nevada, United States. It was listed on the National Register of Historic Places in 2003.

== History ==
It consists of four cemetery sections: Masonic and Odd Fellows sections on the north of U.S. 50, and Calvary (Catholic) and "Citizens" sections on the south side. A fifth section, for Indians, next to the Citizen's section, is not included in the NRHP listing, due to owner issues.

== Notable burials ==
- Loreta Janeta Velázquez (1842 –c. 1897), putative Confederate Army soldier, spy and author

== See also ==
- National Register of Historic Places listings in Lander County, Nevada
- List of cemeteries in Nevada
