= Sonny Bupp =

American child actor (1928–2007)

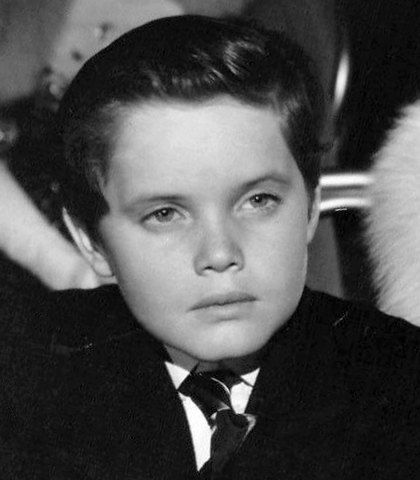
- Bupp in Citizen Kane (1941)
- Born: Moyer MacClaren Bupp; January 10, 1928; New York City, U.S.
- Died: November 1, 2007 (aged 79); Henderson, Nevada, U.S.
- Resting place: Southern Nevada Veterans Memorial Cemetery
- Occupations: Actor; businessman
- Years active: 1934–1942

Moyer MacClaren Bupp (January 10, 1928 – November 1, 2007) professionally known as Sonny Bupp, was an American child film actor and businessman. His most notable film was Citizen Kane (1941), in which he appears as Junior, Charles Foster Kane III, the eight-year-old son of Charles Foster Kane and his first wife, Emily. Bupp was the last surviving credited member of the Citizen Kane cast at his death.

== Career ==
Born Moyer MacClaren Bupp in New York City, Sonny Bupp was the brother of actors Tommy (1924–1983), June (1913–1989) and Ann Bupp (1922–2005). He appeared in over 60 films during his career, including two Our Gang comedies, 1935's Our Gang Follies of 1936, 1937's Cash and Carry with The 3 Stooges, and 1938's Men in Fright.

He appeared in Citizen Kane as the son of Charles Foster Kane, and was the last surviving credited cast member of that film. He also appeared in the 1937 Three Stooges' Cash and Carry, as well as such films as Love Is on the Air (Ronald Reagan's first film), The Renegade Trail, Annie Oakley (with Barbara Stanwyck), Kid Millions, Angels With Dirty Faces, The Devil and Daniel Webster and Tennessee Johnson.

== Later life ==
He served in the U.S. Army during the Korean War and, after his film career ended, became an auto industry executive. He died in Henderson, Nevada, aged 79, from an undisclosed cause. His remains are interred at Southern Nevada Veterans Memorial Cemetery in Boulder City, Nevada.

== Filmography ==
Year	Title	Role	Notes
1934	Kid Millions	Little Boy in Ice Cream Number	Film debut, Uncredited
1935	It Happened in New York	Child	Uncredited
1935	Annie Oakley	Boy at Shooting Gallery	Uncredited
1936	Man Hunt	Young Boy	Uncredited
1936	Song and Dance Man	Boy	Uncredited
1936	Hearts in Bondage	Boy	Uncredited
1936	And Sudden Death	School Boy	Uncredited
1936	San Francisco	Choirboy	Uncredited
1936	Star for a Night	Fritz	Uncredited
1936	Rose Bowl	Young Boy	Uncredited
1936	What Becomes of the Children?	Little Freddy Worthington	
1937	We Who Are About to Die	Hit-and-Run Victim	Uncredited
1937	Woman-Wise	Boy	Uncredited
1937	The Great O'Malley	Boy with Lollipop	Uncredited
1937	Lost Horizon	Boy Being Carried to Plane	Uncredited
1937	Murder Goes to College	Boy	Uncredited
1937	You Can't Buy Luck	Orphan Boy	Uncredited
1937	Michael O'Halloran	Sarge	Uncredited
1937	Reported Missing!	Little Boy on Plane	Uncredited
1937	My Dear Miss Aldrich	Little boy	Uncredited
1937	Love Is on the Air	Little boy	Uncredited
1937	"Cash and Carry"	Jimmy	Uncredited
1937	Love on Toast	Boy	Uncredited
1937	Missing Witnesses	Little boy	Uncredited
1937	Hollywood Hotel	Little boy	Uncredited
1938	Swing Your Lady	Len	
1938	Hunted Men	Boy	Uncredited
1938	Penrod's Double Trouble	Monk	Uncredited
1938	The Storm	Boy	Uncredited
1938	Angels with Dirty Faces	Boy	
1939	Risky Business	Boy	Uncredited
1939	Boy Trouble	Chester Platt	
1939	Sudden Money	Billy	Uncredited
1939	Fixer Dugan	The Boy Chiseler	Uncredited
1939	On Borrowed Time	Boy in Tree	Uncredited
1939	Renegade Trail	Joey Joyce	
1939	When Tomorrow Comes	Boy Hiding from Policeman	Uncredited
1939	No Place to Go	Tommy	
1940	Emergency Squad	Peter	Uncredited
1940	Abe Lincoln in Illinois	Willie Lincoln	Uncredited
1940	Parole Fixer	Bobby Mattison	
1940	I Take This Woman	Murphy Kid	Scenes cut
1940	Little Orvie	Freddie Jackson	Uncredited
1940	Half a Sinner	Willy	
1940	Queen of the Mob	Newsboy	
1940	Three Faces West	Billy Welles	
1940	Diamond Frontier	Karl Bloem	Uncredited
1940	Slightly Tempted	Sonny	Uncredited
1940	She Couldn't Say No	Boy with News of Pansy	Uncredited
1941	Father's Son	Berries Sweeney	Uncredited
1941	Citizen Kane	Charles Foster Kane III	
1941	Sergeant York	Boy in Sunday School	Uncredited
1941	Bad Men of Missouri	Young Great	Uncredited
1941	International Squadron	Boy	Uncredited
1941	One Foot in Heaven	Boy	Uncredited
1941	The Devil and Daniel Webster	Martin Van Aldrich	Uncredited
1941	West of Cimarron	Young Boy	Uncredited
1942	Code of the Outlaw	Work Farm Kid	Uncredited
1942	Syncopation	Newsboy	Uncredited
1942	Wings for the Eagle	Kid Playing Football	Uncredited
1942	The Loves of Edgar Allan Poe	Graham's Office Boy	Uncredited
1942	Eyes of the Underworld	Boy	Uncredited
1942	Tennessee Johnson	Bellboy	Uncredited; final film role

== Bibliography ==
- Goldrup, Tom and Jim (2002). Growing Up on the Set: Interviews with 39 Former Child Actors of Film and Television. McFarland & Co. pp. 38–46. ISBN 1476613702.
- Holmstrom, John (1996). The Moving Picture Boy: An International Encyclopaedia from 1895 to 1995. Norwich: Michael Russell, p. 156-157.
