= United States Department of Veterans Affairs emblems for headstones and markers =

The U.S. Veterans Affairs seal.

The United States Department of Veterans Affairs (VA) maintains many cemeteries specifically devoted to veterans. Most have various rules regarding what must take place in order to be interred there.

== Procedure ==
The VA only permits graphics on government-furnished headstones or markers that are approved emblems of belief, the Civil War Union Shield (including those who served in the U.S. military through the Spanish–American War), the Civil War Confederate Southern Cross of Honor, and the Medal of Honor insignia. Arlington National Cemetery has similar restrictions on headstones, though it is maintained by US Department of the Army.

The religious symbols are rendered as simple inscriptions without sculptural relief or coloring other than black. The emblem of belief is an optional feature.

Generally the VA adds a new symbol a few months after receiving a petition from a faith group. However, the Wiccan symbol was only added in 2007 to settle a lawsuit filed on behalf of several families by Americans United for the Separation of Church and State in November 2006. A separate parallel lawsuit was filed on behalf of two Wiccan churches and three families by the American Civil Liberties Union in September 2006, which was resolved by the same settlement.

The first interfaith headstone, which includes a Wiccan pentacle for Jan Deanna O'Rourke and a Presbyterian Cross for her husband, was installed at Arlington National Cemetery on May 1, 2007, and dedicated on July 4, 2007.

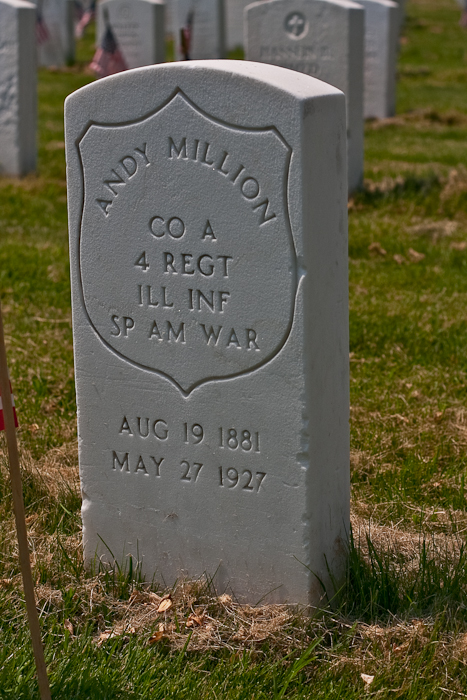
Spanish–American War veteran, Cypress Hills National Cemetery

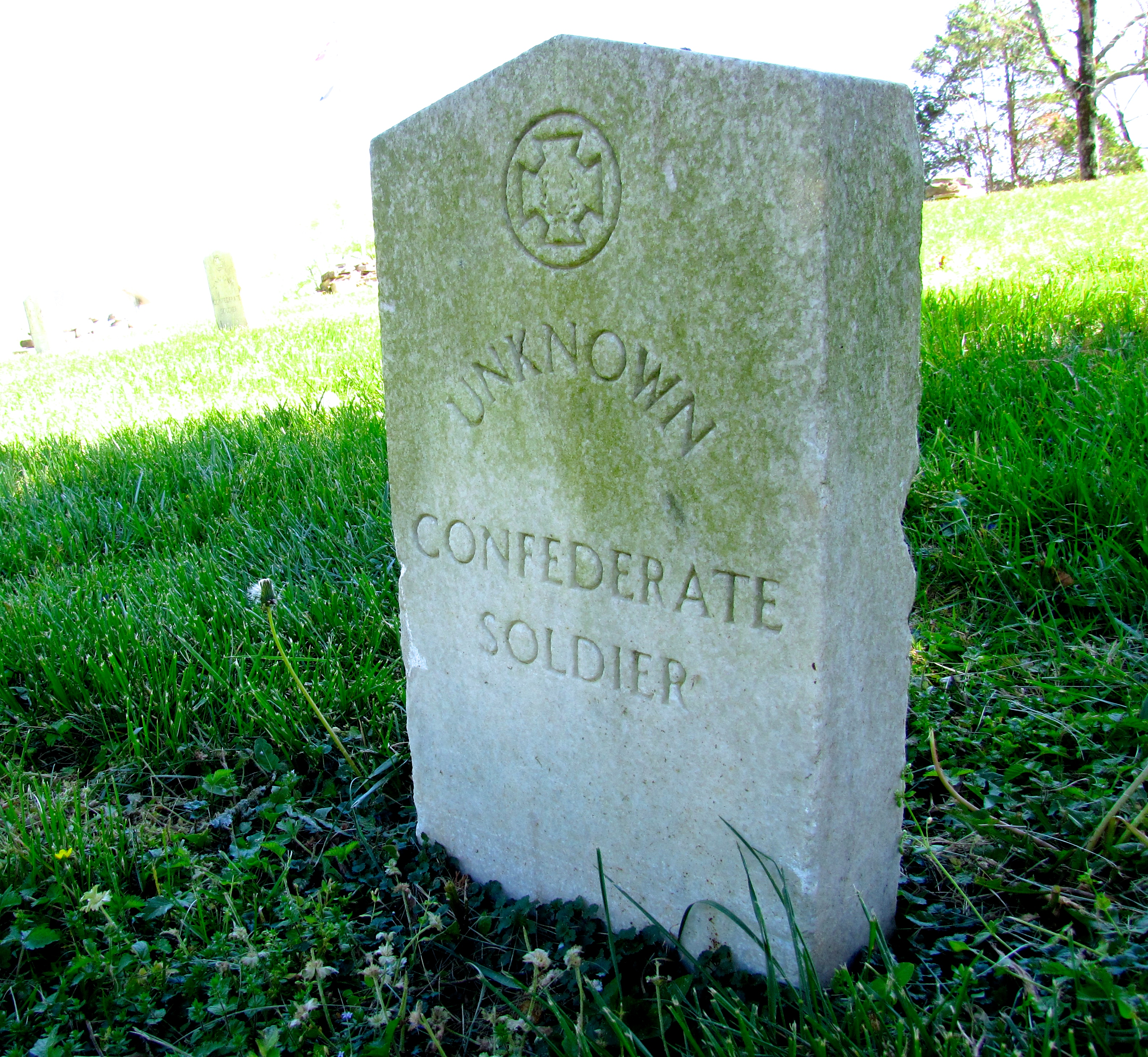
Unknown veteran of the Confederate States of America, Beechgrove, Tennessee

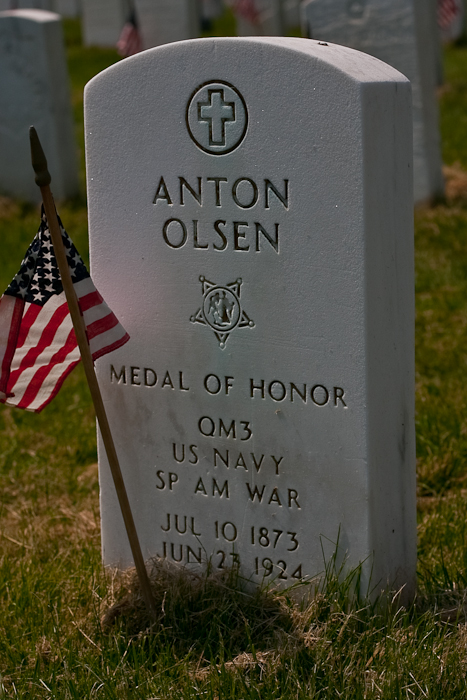
Medal of Honor recipient Anton Olsen, Cypress Hills National Cemetery

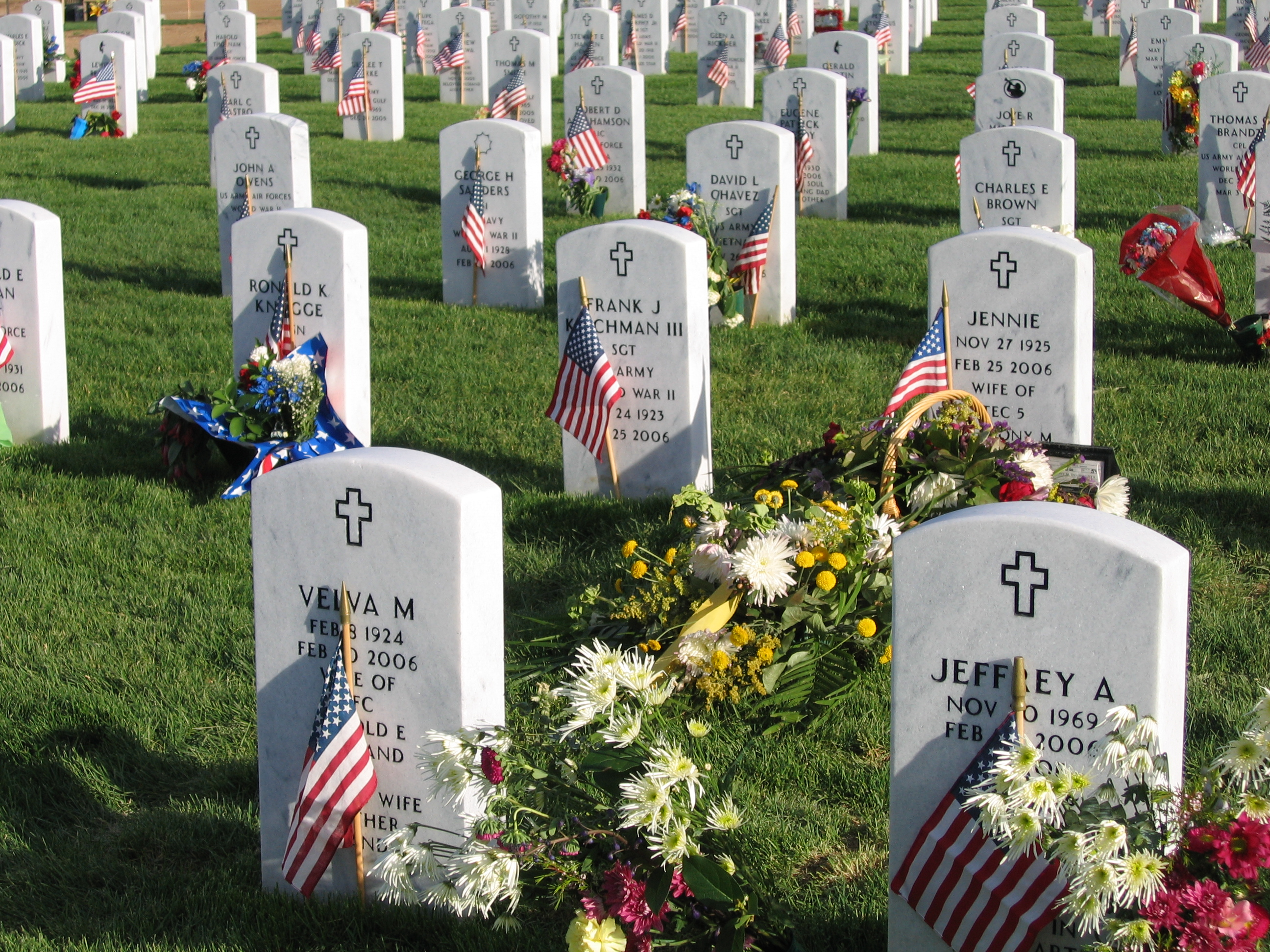
Gravesites at Fort Logan National Cemetery, Memorial Day 2006

== Headstone and marker symbols ==
The following emblems and emblem numbers are publicized as available for government headstones and markers as of November 10, 2025. A process is in place to consider approving additional religious or belief system emblems requested by the families of individuals eligible for these headstones and markers.

Each emblem is given its official USVA name and designation, with added additional links for related symbolism (*) and for related movements (†). Explanatory footnotes are provided where symbols' meanings are not immediately apparent.

Latin (Christian) Cross †
USVA emblem 01

Buddhist *
USVA emblem 02

Judaism (Star of David)
USVA emblem 03

Presbyterian Cross *
USVA emblem 04

Russian Orthodox Cross * †
USVA emblem 05

Lutheran Cross
USVA emblem 06

Episcopal Cross
USVA emblem 07

Unitarian (Flaming Chalice)
USVA emblem 08

United Methodist *
USVA emblem 09

Aaronic Order Church
USVA emblem 10

Mormon (Angel Moroni)
USVA emblem 11

Native American Church of North America *
USVA emblem 12

Serbian Orthodox
USVA emblem 13

Greek Cross
USVA emblem 14

Baháʼí (9 Pointed Star)
USVA emblem 15

Atheist * **
USVA emblem 16

Muslim (Crescent and Star)
USVA emblem 17

Hindu *
USVA emblem 18

Konko-Kyo Faith
USVA emblem 19

Community of Christ
USVA emblem 20

Sufism Reoriented
USVA emblem 21

Tenrikyo Church
USVA emblem 22

Seicho-no-Ie
USVA emblem 23

Church of World Messianity
USVA emblem 24

United Church of Religious Science
USVA emblem 25

Christian Reformed Church
USVA emblem 26

United Moravian Church
USVA emblem 27

Eckankar
USVA emblem 28

Christian Church
USVA emblem 29

Christian & Missionary Alliance
USVA emblem 30

United Church of Christ
USVA emblem 31

Humanist Emblem of Spirit *
USVA emblem 32

Presbyterian Church (USA)
USVA emblem 33

Izumo Taishakyo Mission of Hawaii
USVA emblem 34

Soka Gakkai International (USA)
USVA emblem 35

Sikh (Khanda)
USVA emblem 36

Wicca (Pentacle)
USVA emblem 37

Lutheran Church Missouri Synod
USVA emblem 38

New Apostolic
USVA emblem 39

Seventh Day Adventist Church
USVA emblem 40

Celtic Cross
USVA emblem 41

Armenian Cross †
USVA emblem 42

Farohar †
USVA emblem 43

Messianic Jewish
USVA emblem 44

Kohen Hands Judaism
USVA emblem 45

Catholic Celtic Cross †
USVA emblem 46

The First Church of Christ, Scientist (Cross and Crown)
USVA emblem 47

Medicine Wheel
USVA emblem 48

Infinity *
USVA emblem 49

Luther Rose †
USVA emblem 51

Landing Eagle
USVA emblem 52

Four Directions
USVA emblem 53

Church of Nazarene
USVA emblem 54

Hammer of Thor *
USVA emblem 55

Unification Church
USVA emblem 56

Sandhill Crane (Note: The sandhill crane (Antigone canadensis) was used by Linda Campbell, the first homosexual soldier to receive burial rights for a same-sex spouse; it was said to symbolize "the ability of a soul to move between worlds, realms, times, traditions, and elements.")
USVA emblem 57

Church of God
USVA emblem 58

Pomegranate
USVA emblem 59

Messianic *
USVA emblem 60

Shinto *
USVA emblem 61

Sacred Heart
USVA emblem 62

African Ancestral Traditionalist (Nyame Ye Ohene) (Note: An Adinkra symbol; the name is Akan for "God is King.")
USVA emblem 63

Maltese Cross
USVA emblem 64

Druid (Awen)
USVA emblem 65

Wisconsin Evangelical Lutheran Synod
USVA emblem 66

Polish National Catholic Church
USVA emblem 67

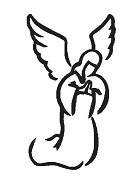
Guardian Angel
USVA emblem 68

Heart
USVA emblem 69

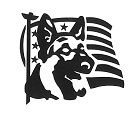
German Shepherd and Flag (Note: Depicts a German Shepherd and American flag)
USVA emblem 70

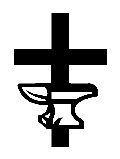
African Methodist Episcopal (AME)
USVA emblem 71

Evangelical Lutheran Church
USVA emblem 72

Universalist Cross
USVA emblem 73

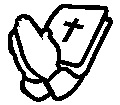
Faith and Prayer
USVA emblem 74

Ichthys
USVA emblem 75

Nichiren Shoshu Temple
USVA emblem 76

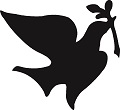
Dove of Peace
USVA emblem 77

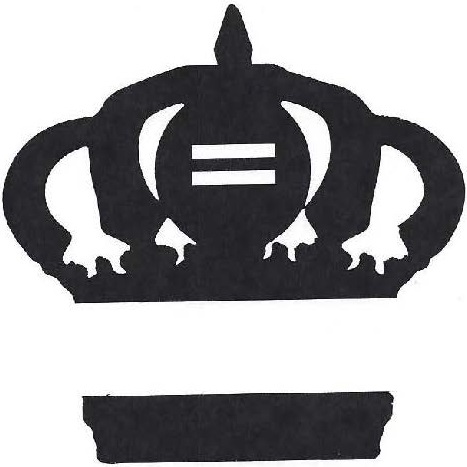
Kingian Faith
USVA emblem 78

Druze (Druzism Five-pointed star)
USVA emblem 98

== See also ==
- Pennant (church)
- Religious symbolism
- Religious symbolism in the United States military
- United States National Cemetery System
- List of military tombstone abbreviations
