= Martin Brandtner =

American military personnel

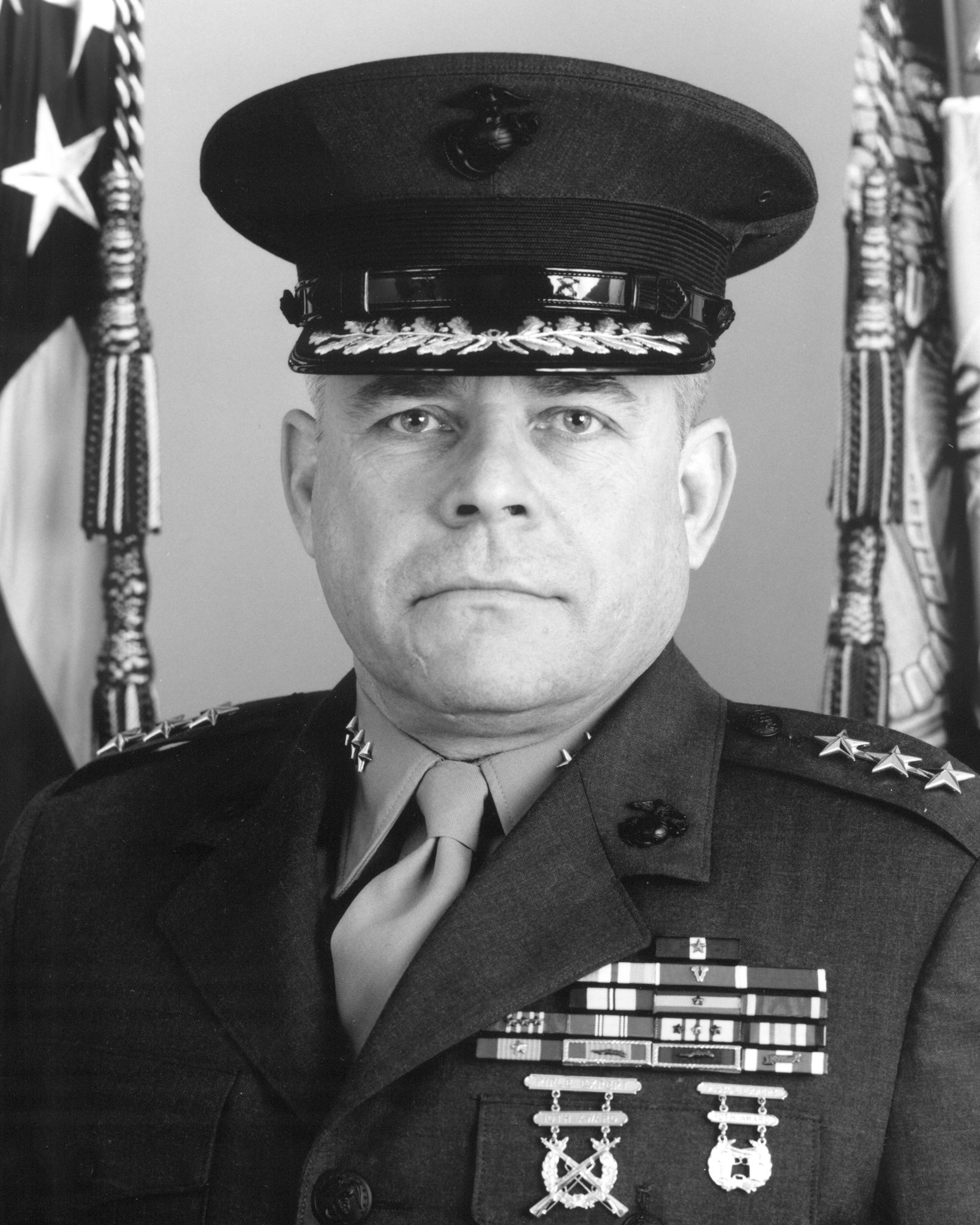
- Born: 3 July 1938; Minneapolis, Minnesota, U.S.
- Died: 3 January 2017 (aged 78) Reno, Nevada, U.S.
- Buried: Northern Nevada Veterans Memorial Cemetery
- Allegiance: United States of America
- Branch: United States Marine Corps
- Service years: 1960–1993
- Rank: Lieutenant General
- Commands: 1st Recruit Training Battalion; 5th Marine Regiment; 2nd Force Service Support Group; 10th Marine Expeditionary Brigade
- Conflicts: Vietnam War
- Awards: Navy Cross (2); Defense Distinguished Service Medal; Defense Superior Service Medal; Legion of Merit; Purple Heart

Martin Louis Brandtner (3 July 1938 – 3 January 2017) was a highly decorated United States Marine Corps lieutenant general. He was one of just two Marines to be awarded two Navy Crosses during the Vietnam War.

== Early life and education ==
Brandtner was born on 3 July 1938 in Minneapolis, Minnesota to Alex Peter and Ida Marie (née Kjelstad) Brandtner. He majored in English at the University of Minnesota, where he earned varsity letters on the football and wrestling teams. Upon his graduation in 1960, he was commissioned a second lieutenant via the Naval Reserve Officers Training Corps Regular Scholarship Program following graduation from the University of Minnesota in June 1960.

== Marine Corps career ==
Following graduation from The Basic School, Quantico, Virginia, in March 1961, General Brandtner remained at Quantico where he was assigned to the Officer Candidates School, serving as a platoon leader until January 1962.

Reassigned to the 1st Marine Brigade, FMF, in February 1962, he served with the 1st Battalion, 4th Marines as a rifle platoon commander, battalion staff officer, rifle company executive officer and rifle company commander, respectively.

In February 1965, General Brandtner was assigned to the 1st Marine Aircraft Wing, Iwakuni, Japan, serving as the S-1/Adjutant of Marine Wing Headquarters Group 1. Deploying to the Republic of Vietnam in April 1965, he assumed additional duties as Area Defense Coordinator for the Wing Headquarters compound at Da Nang Air Base.

Returning from overseas in April 1966, he reported to the Landing Force Training Command, Pacific, where he served as Branch Head of the Basic Amphibious Training Branch.

In July 1968, General Brandtner returned to the Republic of Vietnam, where he joined the 1st Battalion, 5th Marines serving as a rifle company commander, and upon promotion to major in November 1968, as Battalion Operations Officer and Battalion Executive Officer. While serving as Commanding Officer, Company D, he was wounded in action and was twice awarded the Navy Cross, the nation's second highest award for valor in combat. He is one of only two Marines to earn that distinction in the Vietnam War.

In August 1969, General Brandtner returned to the United States and assumed duties as the Inspector-Instructor, 26th Rifle Company, United States Marine Corps Reserve, Minneapolis, Minnesota, where he served until selected to attend the Naval War College of Command and General Staff, Newport, Rhode Island, in 1972. He graduated with honors and earned a master's degree in International Relations from George Washington University in 1973.

General Brandtner then reported to Headquarters Marine Corps, Washington, D.C., where he served as a Plans Officer in the Plans Division until July 1976.

Again assigned overseas, he reported to the 3rd Marine Division on Okinawa, Japan, where he served as the G-3 Operations Officer until he returned to the United States in July 1977. While overseas, he was promoted to lieutenant colonel in April 1977.

From July 1977 to June 1980, General Brandtner was assigned to Marine Corps Recruit Depot San Diego where he served initially as the Executive Officer, Headquarters and Service Battalion. He subsequently was assigned as the Commanding Officer, 1st Recruit Training Battalion, where he served until selected to attend the Air War College in July 1980.

Graduating with distinction from the Air War College in July 1981, General Brandtner was selected to be the Senior Military Assistant to the Under Secretary of Defense for Policy, where he served until July 1984. During this tour, he was promoted to colonel in July 1982. Returning to the FMF, General Brandtner was assigned as the Assistant Chief of Staff, G-4, I Marine Amphibious Force, Camp Pendleton, California, where he served until May 1985. The following month, Brandtner assumed command of the 5th Marine Regiment from 6 June 1985 to 14 May 1986. In July 1986, he was assigned duty as Chief of Staff, 1st Marine Division, FMF. While serving in this capacity, he was selected in December 1987 for promotion to brigadier general. He was assigned duty as the Assistant Division Commander, 2d Marine Division, FMF, Atlantic, Camp Lejeune, North Carolina on 1 June 1988 and advanced to brigadier general on 25 July 1988, and assigned duty as the Commanding General, 2d Force Service Support Group (Rein), FMF, Atlantic, Camp Lejeune, North Carolina, on 27 September 1988. From December 1988 through February 1989, General Brandtner served as the Commanding General, 10th Marine Expeditionary Brigade, at Camp Lejeune.

Advanced to major general on 11 May 1990, he was assigned duty as the Vice Director for Operations, J-3 Joint Staff, on 3 July 1990. General Brandtner was promoted to lieutenant general on 11 March 1991, and assumed duty as Director for Operations, J-3, Joint Staff, Washington. He served in this capacity until his retirement on 1 June 1993.

=== Military awards ===
Brandtner's personal decorations include:

Row-1	Navy Cross with 5/16" Gold star	Defense Distinguished Service Medal	Defense Superior Service Medal	Legion of Merit w/ Combat "V"
Row-2	Purple Heart	Combat Action Ribbon	Navy Presidential Unit Citation w/ 3/16" bronze star	Navy Unit Commendation
Row-3	Navy Meritorious Unit Commendation w/ three bronze stars	National Defense Service Medal w/ bronze star	Vietnam Service Medal w/ one 3/16" silver star and two bronze stars	Navy Sea Service Deployment Ribbon
Row-4	Vietnam Gallantry Cross w/ bronze star	Vietnam Gallantry Cross unit citation w/ Palm	Vietnam Civil Actions unit citation w/ Palm	Vietnam Campaign Medal

=== First Navy Cross citation ===
The President of the United States of America takes pleasure in presenting the Navy Cross to Captain Martin L. Brandtner (MCSN: 0-80625), United States Marine Corps, for extraordinary heroism while serving as Commanding Officer of Company D, First Battalion, Fifth Marines, FIRST Marine Division (Reinforced), Fleet Marine Force, in connection with operations against the enemy in the Republic of Vietnam. On 3 September 1968, while conducting a reconnaissance in force near the village of Lan Phouc in Quang Nam Province, the lead platoon of Company D became pinned down by intense automatic weapons fire from a large North Vietnamese Army force. As he moved forward to assess the situation, Captain Brandtner was wounded by grenade launcher fire from an enemy soldier standing in a nearby trench. With complete disregard for his own safety, Captain Brandtner boldly exposed himself to the hostile fire and hurling a hand grenade, killed the North Vietnamese soldier. Suddenly, the Marines came under an intense North Vietnamese hand grenade attack, and when one of the lethal objects landed at Captain Brandtner's feet, he unhesitatingly seized the grenade and threw it back at the enemy. On two more occasions he completely disregarded his own safety to seize hand grenades which were thrown near his position and hurl them toward the hostile force. When another grenade landed in the midst of four nearby Marines, Captain Brandtner fearlessly rushed to their position, picked up the lethal object and hurled it away from his companions. Then, concerned only for the welfare of his fellow Marines, he knocked two of the men to the ground and quickly placed himself on top of them, thereby absorbing the fragments from the exploding grenade in his protective armor and preventing possible death or serious injury to his companions. Realizing the numerical superiority of the enemy, he consolidated his company's position and skillfully adjusted effective supporting arms fire which caused the hostile force to flee and enabled his Marines to overrun the objective. By his courage, intrepid fighting spirit, and selfless devotion to duty at the risk of his life, Captain Brandtner sustained and enhanced the highest traditions of the Marine Corps and of the United States Naval Service.

=== Second Navy Cross citation ===
The President of the United States of America takes pleasure in presenting a Gold Star in lieu of a Second Award of the Navy Cross to Captain Martin L. Brandtner (MCSN: 0-80625), United States Marine Corps, for extraordinary heroism in action while serving as the Commanding Officer, Company D, First Battalion, Fifth Marines, FIRST Marine Division (Reinforced), Fleet Marine Force, in the Republic of Vietnam on 11 September 1968. Assigned a mission to conduct a search and destroy operation near the village of My Binh, Quang Dia Loc District, Quang Nam Province, Captain Brandtner selected his defensive position and began deploying his platoons for their assigned night activities. As the First Platoon departed, en route to their night ambush site, they began receiving intense small arms, automatic weapons and rocket fire from a numerically superior North Vietnamese Army force. Simultaneously, the enemy, approximately the size of the two North Vietnamese Army companies, began an attack on the Command Group with 82-mm. mortars, intense automatic weapons fire and P40 rockets. Quickly analyzing the situation and immediately realizing the seriousness and the danger involved, Captain Brandtner disregarded his own personal safety and moved forward to an extremely exposed position in order that he could personally control the battle at hand. When the enemy began the first of a series of "human wave" sapper attacks against the company's position, he calmly and with outstanding presence of mind moved from position to position reorganizing, encouraging and rallying his outnumbered and dazed company into an inspired fighting unit which completely stopped the momentum of the enemy attack and forced them to withdraw. Realizing the enemy were regrouping for subsequent attacks, he calmly adjusted his supporting artillery fire to within 200 meters of his lines, again raising havoc and confusion within the enemy's ranks. When the North Vietnamese Army units began their second attack, the devastating fires of a well organized Marine Corps rifle company caught them off balance and inflicted heavy enemy casualties. Twice more, the determined enemy launched massive "human wave" assaults on the perimeter of Company D, but the steadfast efforts of the men of the company proved to be too much for the now overwhelmed and demoralized enemy. After more than two hours of persistent attempts to overrun the company, the enemy broke contact. Daylight revealed 67 North Vietnamese dead as mute testimony to the ferocious encounter that had taken place. The number of enemy dead and wounded evacuated could not be estimated. Company D suffered only one Marine killed and fourteen wounds serious enough to require evacuation. By his outstanding courage, superb leadership and unswerving devotion to duty, Captain Brandtner served to inspire all who observed him and upheld the highest traditions of the Marine Corps and the United States Naval Service.

== Post-military career ==
General Brandtner retired to Reno, Nevada and served as Development Director for the Roman Catholic Diocese of Reno. He also sat on the Board of Directors for Bishop Manogue High School.

He died on 3 January 2017, at the age of 78, in Reno, Nevada. On 18 January 2017, he was interred at Northern Nevada Veterans Memorial Cemetery, in Fernley, Nevada, with full military honors.

== See also ==
- List of Navy Cross recipients for the Vietnam War

Military offices
Preceded by Carl A. Shaver	Commanding Officer of the 5th Marine Regiment; June 6, 1985 – May 14, 1986	Succeeded by Thomas V. Draude
