= Eyes of the Underworld (1942 film) =

1942 film by Roy William Neill

- Directed by: Roy William Neill
- Written by: Maxwell Shane; Michael L. Simmons; Arthur Strawn
- Produced by: Ben Pivar
- Starring: Richard Dix; Wendy Barrie; Lon Chaney Jr.
- Cinematography: George Robinson
- Edited by: Frank Gross
- Music by: Hans J. Salter
- Production company: Universal Pictures
- Distributed by: Universal Pictures
- Release date: October 2, 1942 (U.S.)
- Running time: 61 minutes
- Country: United States
- Language: English

Eyes of the Underworld is a 1942 American film noir crime film directed by Roy William Neill starring Richard Dix, Wendy Barrie and Lon Chaney Jr.

== Cast ==
- Richard Dix as Police Chief Richard Bryan
- Wendy Barrie as Betty Standing
- Lon Chaney Jr. as Benny
- Lloyd Corrigan as J.C. Thomas
- Don Porter as Edward Jason
- Billy Lee as Mickey Bryan
- Marc Lawrence as Gordon Finch
- Edward Pawley as Lance Merlin
- Joseph Crehan as Kirby - Assistant Police Chief
- Wade Boteler as Sergeant Clancy
- Steve Pendleton as Hub Gelsey
- Mike Raffetto as District Attorney Fred
- Sonny Bupp as Boy (uncredited)

== Bibliography ==
- Weaver, Tom & Brunas, Michael & Brunas, John. Universal Horrors: The Studio's Classic Films, 1931-1946. McFarland & Company, 2007.
