= Men in Fright =

- Directed by: George Sidney
- Written by: Carl Dudley; Marty Schwartz; Hal Law; Robert A. McGowan
- Produced by: Jack Chertok
- Starring: Carl Switzer; George McFarland; Darla Hood; Eugene Lee; Billie Thomas; Sonny Bupp
- Cinematography: Robert Pittack
- Distributed by: Metro-Goldwyn-Mayer
- Release date: October 15, 1938
- Running time: 10:28
- Country: United States
- Language: English
- Budget: $17,872

Men in Fright is a 1938 Our Gang short comedy film directed by George Sidney. Produced and released by Metro-Goldwyn-Mayer, it was the 172nd Our Gang short to be released.

== Plot ==
Darla has had a tonsillectomy, and the gang, announcing themselves as "Third Ward Sunshine Spredders Club", go to the hospital to pay her a visit. They bring with them a large picnic basket full of food that they know Darla can't eat, intending to eat it all themselves after Darla refuses it. When the kids make it to Darla's room in the children's ward, Spanky assigns Alfalfa to stay outside and guard the picnic basket until they're sure Darla's still too sick to eat any of it.

While waiting, however, Alfalfa falls for the scheme of another resident of the children's ward—a boy intending to escape from his own tonsillectomy. He offers Alfalfa a dime to change clothes with him while he "goes for a little walk", leaving Alfalfa to fend for himself when an orderly comes to collect him for the tonsil operation. While in the elevator, little Gary, who has stowed away aboard the gurney on which the orderly is transporting Alfalfa, opens a canister of laughing gas, sending himself, Alfalfa, the orderly, and even the elevator operator into various fits of mirth and odd behavior. Spanky, Porky, Buckwheat, and Leonard do their best to try to catch Alfalfa, who, thanks to the laughing gas, is now romping deliriously through the hospital and causing havoc and mischief.

When Spanky and the boys finally manage to drag Alfalfa back into Darla's room, a still tipsy Alfalfa hops on her bed and jumps for the chandelier, finally calming down after falling to the floor and knocking a pitcher of water off the dresser and onto his head. Just before finally diving into their picnic, a nurse arrives to deliver Darla's afternoon dish of ice cream (ice cream being the only food she can eat at the moment). The nurse also offers the six boys dishes of ice cream as well, and when she leaves, they tear into their picnic basket as well, combining ice cream with hamburgers, pickles, hot dogs, and watermelons in such a way that they all end up with horrible stomachaches (depicted through an animated segment of a hot dog fighting with a scoop of ice cream). The boys are admitted into the hospital for indigestion, just as Darla is released to go home. Darla and her mother promise to visit the boys tomorrow and offer to bring "some nice presents", forcing Spanky and Alfalfa to wince and moan "just bring flowers" as they are wheeled away for their treatment: one dose each of castor oil.

== Cast ==
=== The Gang ===
- Darla Hood as Darla Hood
- Eugene Lee as Porky
- George McFarland as Spanky
- Carl Switzer as Alfalfa
- Billie Thomas as Buckwheat
- Leonard Landy as Leonard
- Gary Jasgur as Gary

=== Additional cast ===
- Sonny Bupp as Sonny
- Barbara Bedford as Sonny's mother
- Margaret Bert as Nurse at front desk
- Don Castle as Mack, orderly
- Nell Craig as Maternity ward nurse
- Bess Flowers as Darla's mother
- Mary MacLaren as Nurse with ice cream
- Jack Rice as Charlie, orderly
- Ray Turner as elevator operator

== Notes ==
Men in Fright is considered one of the better of the MGM Our Gang comedies. It was shot on the sets used for MGM's Dr. Kildare films.

The title Men in Fright is a parody of the 1934 film Men in White, which in and of itself was parodied by The Three Stooges as Men in Black that same year).

== See also ==
- Our Gang filmography
