= List of military tombstone abbreviations =

The following is a partial list of military tombstone abbreviations used in American cemeteries.

== United States ==
=== Ranks ===
- BBG = Brevet Brigadier General
- BGEN = Brigadier General
- BMG = Brevet Major General
- CAPT = Captain
- CDR = Commander
- CMSGT = Chief Master Sergeant
- COL = Colonel
- CPL = Corporal
- CPT = Captain
- CSGT = Commissary Sergeant
- ENS = Ensign
- GEN = General
- LCDR = Lieutenant Commander
- LCPL = Lance Corporal
- LGEN = Lieutenant General
- LT = Lieutenant
- 1LT = First Lieutenant (2LT = Second Lieutenant, and so on)
- LTC = Lieutenant Colonel
- MAJ = Major
- MGEN = Major General
- MSGT = Master Sergeant
- NCO = Non-Commissioned Officer
- OSGT = Ordnance Sergeant
- PFC = Private First Class
- PVT = Private
- PVT 1CL = Private First Class
- QM = Quartermaster
- QMSGT = Quartermaster Sergeant
- SFC = Sergeant First Class
- SGM = Sergeant Major
- SGT = Sergeant
- SMSGT = Senior Master Sergeant
- SPC = Specialist
- TSGT = Technical Sergeant
- WO = Warrant Officer

=== U.S. Civil War (1861–1865) ===
==== Regiments ====
- 58 PENN. INF. = 58th Regiment of the Pennsylvania Infantry Volunteers
- 185 N.Y. INF. = 185th Regiment of the New York Infantry Volunteers

==== Divisions ====
- CO. G = Company G
- CO. K = Company K

=== World War I (1917–1918) ===
==== Divisions ====
- 17 CO = 17th Company

== See also ==
- United States Department of Veterans Affairs emblems for headstones and markers
