= William E. Adams =

United States Army Medal of Honor recipient

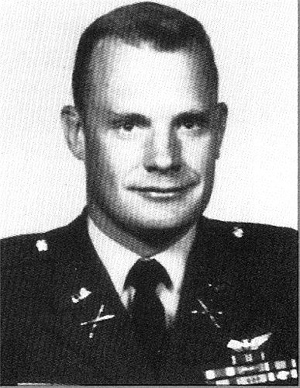
- Major William E. Adams
- Born: June 16, 1939; Casper, Wyoming, U.S.
- Died: May 25, 1971 (aged 31); Kontum Province, Vietnam
- Burial place: Fort Logan National Cemetery, Denver, Colorado
- Military career
- Allegiance: United States
- Branch: United States Army
- Service years: 1962–1971
- Rank: Major
- Unit: 52nd Aviation Battalion
- Conflicts: Vietnam War †
- Awards: Medal of Honor; Distinguished Flying Cross; Bronze Star Medal; Purple Heart; Meritorious Service Medal; Air Medal; Army Commendation Medal

William Edward Adams (June 16, 1939 – May 25, 1971) was a major in the United States Army who was posthumously awarded the Medal of Honor for his actions during the Vietnam War.

On May 25, 1971, Adams volunteered to fly a helicopter to rescue one wounded American as well as the remains of the other three crew members, who had been shot down in a mission the previous day, as he refused to leave any of his men behind, deceased or living. They were encircled in Firebase Five in Kontum Province. He did this knowing full well that the clear weather allowed North Vietnamese anti-aircraft gunners to easily see their targets. His aircraft was bombarded by anti-aircraft fire, but Adams still persevered and rescued the three men. As he was leaving, his aircraft was shot down, and Adams was killed. He was awarded the Medal of Honor posthumously in 1972.

== Early life ==
Adams was born in Casper, Wyoming. He attended Wentworth Military Academy in Lexington, Missouri, where he graduated in the junior college Class of 1959. Three years later, Adams graduated from Colorado State University as a member of the Class of 1962.

== Military career ==
Adams joined the United States Army in Kansas City, Missouri, in 1962. He began his tour in Vietnam on July 6, 1970. On May 25, 1971, Adams, a major, volunteered to fly a lightly armed helicopter mission to rescue three dead US advisors and a wounded crew chief, who were on a helicopter which had previously been shot down, from a besieged firebase in Kontum Province, despite the clear weather which would provide the numerous enemy anti-aircraft around the location with clear visibility. Despite fire from machine gun emplacements and rockets, Adams succeeded in landing at the firebase while supporting helicopter gunships attacked the enemy positions. After take off, however, the helicopter was hit by fire. Adams momentarily regained control and attempted to land, however the helicopter exploded in mid air and crashed. Adams, who was 31 at the time, was killed.

Adams is buried at Fort Logan National Cemetery in Denver, Colorado.

== Memorials ==
The Vietnam War Memorial formerly on the campus of Wentworth Military Academy, is the same make and model helicopter that Adams was flying when he was killed. He is listed on the Vietnam Veterans Memorial on panel 03W, row 054. He is honored in multiple locations across the campus of Colorado State University, most notably at the Vietnam memorial bridge.

== Medal of Honor citation ==
Maj. William Adams distinguished himself on 25 May 1971 while serving as a helicopter pilot in Kontum Province in the Republic of Vietnam. On that date, Maj. William Adams volunteered to fly a lightly armed helicopter in an attempt to evacuate 3 seriously wounded soldiers from a small fire base which was under attack by a large enemy force. He made the decision with full knowledge that numerous antiaircraft weapons were positioned around the base and that the clear weather would afford the enemy gunners unobstructed view of all routes into the base. As he approached the base, the enemy gunners opened fire with heavy machine guns, rocket-propelled grenades and small arms. Undaunted by the fusillade, he continued his approach determined to accomplish the mission. Displaying tremendous courage under fire, he calmly directed the attacks of supporting gunships while maintaining absolute control of the helicopter he was flying. He landed the aircraft at the fire base despite the ever-increasing enemy fire and calmly waited until the wounded soldiers were placed on board. As his aircraft departed from the fire base, it was struck and seriously damaged by enemy anti-aircraft fire and began descending. Flying with exceptional skill, he immediately regained control of the crippled aircraft and attempted a controlled landing. Despite his valiant efforts, the helicopter exploded, overturned, and plummeted to earth amid the hail of enemy fire. Maj. William Adams' conspicuous gallantry, intrepidity, and humanitarian regard for his fellow man were in keeping with the most cherished traditions of the military service and reflected utmost credit on him and the U S. Army.

== See also ==
- List of Medal of Honor recipients for the Vietnam War
- See a photograph of Maj Adams Headstone
