= Dorothy L. Starbuck =

Dorothy L. Starbuck (October 17, 1917 - July 19, 1996) was an American Women's Army Corps (WAC) officer during World War II who went on to work for the Veterans Administration (VA). Starbuck served overseas with the WAC and as a VA civil servant, she became the first woman to hold several important positions in that department.

== Biography ==
Starbuck was born into a large family in Denver, Colorado, on October 17, 1917, where she had 11 siblings. Starbuck graduated from Loretto Heights College with a bachelor's degree in journalism and went on to do graduate work at the University of Denver. She taught elementary school for two years.

In 1942, Starbuck joined the Women's Army Corps (WAC) and earned her commission from the Army Corps Officers' Candidate School as a second lieutenant in 1942. Her first duty station was at Lowry Army Airfield as a commander of a group of photo analysts. Starbuck later served overseas during World War II and achieved the rank of captain. In Europe, during the war, she served at General Dwight D. Eisenhower's London Headquarters, where she held a top secret clearance. She left the service in December 1945.

In 1946, she became a clerk at the Chicago Regional Office of the Veterans Administration (VA). In 1962, she was named the assistant director of the Baltimore VA Regional Office, making her the first woman to earn a senior manager position in the VA. By 1963, she was director of the Denver Regional VA Office. In 1977, Starbuck was named the chief benefits director of the VA, becoming the first woman to hold that position. That same year, she argued that Women Air Force Service Pilots (WASP) were not entitled to veterans' benefits since they had been a civilian program.

In 1980, she received the President's Award for Distinguished Federal Civilian Service. Starbuck retired from the VA in 1985. She died on July 19, 1996, and was buried at Fort Logan National Cemetery.
