= Atomic whirl =

Universal symbol of Atheism

The atomic whirl. There are many other variations of the atomic whirl that exist.

The atomic whirl is a symbol of science and has also come to be used as the worldwide symbol of atheism.

The atomic whirl is based on the historical Rutherford model of the atom, which erroneously showed the orbital paths of electrons around the central nucleus, and not on the atomic orbitals. It resembles the authoritative logos and symbols of the United States Atomic Energy Commission and the International Atomic Energy Agency who also based their designs on the Rutherford Model.

The symbol was adapted by the American Atheists organization to symbolize that "only through the use of scientific analysis and free, open inquiry can humankind reach out for a better life". In this version, the lower part of the central loop is left open or "broken" to represent the fact that atheists accept that while they rely on the scientific method, they are searching for the answers, and in some cases, further questions.

== Approved emblem of belief (US) ==
United States Department of Veterans Affairs headstone emblem 16

This symbol (with an added 'A' in the center) is one of the permitted "Emblems of Belief" that the United States Department of Veterans Affairs allows on government-furnished headstones and markers.
