= 63rd Pennsylvania Infantry Regiment =

Union Army infantry regiment

63rd Pennsylvania Volunteer Infantry
- Active: August 1861 – September 11, 1864
- Country: United States of America
- Allegiance: Union
- Branch: Infantry
- Engagements: Siege of Yorktown; Battle of Williamsburg; Battle of Seven Pines; Seven Days Battles; Battle of Groveton; Second Battle of Bull Run; Battle of Chantilly; Battle of Fredericksburg; Battle of Chancellorsville; Battle of Gettysburg; Bristoe Campaign; Mine Run Campaign; Battle of the Wilderness; Battle of Spotsylvania Court House; Battle of Cold Harbor; Siege of Petersburg; First Battle of Deep Bottom; Second Battle of Deep Bottom (3 companies)

The 63rd Pennsylvania Volunteer Infantry was an infantry regiment that served in the Union Army during the American Civil War.

== Service ==
The 63rd Pennsylvania Infantry was organized at Pittsburgh, Pennsylvania, in August 1861 and mustered in for a three-year enlistment under the command of Colonel Alexander Hays.

The regiment was attached to Jameson's Brigade, Heintzelman's Division, Army of the Potomac, to March 1862. 1st Brigade, 3rd Division, III Corps, Army of the Potomac, to August 1862. 1st Brigade, 1st Division, III Corps, to March 1864. 2nd Brigade, 3rd Division, II Corps, to September 1864.

The 63rd Pennsylvania Infantry mustered out beginning July 31, 1864, and concluding September 11, 1864. Veterans and recruits were transferred to the 105th Pennsylvania Infantry.

== Detailed service ==
Left Pennsylvania for Washington, D.C., August 26. Duty in the defenses of Washington, D.C., until March 1862. Reconnaissance to Pohick Church and the Occoquan November 12, 1861. Pohick Church and the Occoquan March 5, 1862 (detachment). Moved to the Peninsula March 16–18. Siege of Yorktown April 5–May 4. Battle of Williamsburg May 5. Battle of Fair Oaks (Seven Pines) May 31 – June 1. Seven days before Richmond June 25 – July 1. Oak Grove June 25. Glendale June 30. Malvern Hill July 1. Duty at Harrison's Landing until August 16. Movement to Centreville August 16–26. Bristoe Station or Kettle Run August 27. Buckland's Bridge, Broad Run, August 27. Battle of Groveton August 29. Second Battle of Bull Run August 30. Battle of Chantilly September 1. Duty in the defenses of Washington and guarding fords in Maryland until October. March up the Potomac to Leesburg, then to Falmouth, Va., October 11 – November 19. Battle of Fredericksburg December 12–15. Burnside's second Campaign, "Mud March," January 20–24, 1863. At Falmouth until April. Chancellorsville Campaign April 27 – May 6. Battle of Chancellorsville May 1–5. Gettysburg Campaign June 11 – July 24. Battle of Gettysburg July 1–3. Pursuit of Lee July 5–24. Whapping Heights, Va., July 23. Duty on line of the Rappahannock until October. Bristoe Campaign October 9–22. Auburn and Bristoe October 13–14. Advance to line of the Rappahannock November 7–8. Kelly's Ford November 7. Mine Run Campaign November 26 – December 2. Payne's Farm November 27. Demonstration on the Rapidan February 6–7, 1864. Rapidan Campaign May 4–June 12. Battles of the Wilderness May 5–7. Laurel Hill May 8. Spotsylvania May 8–12. Po River May 10. Spotsylvania Court House May 12–21. Assault on the Salient May 12. Harris' Farm May 19. North Anna River May 23–26. Line of the Pamunkey May 26–28. Totopotomoy May 29–31. Cold Harbor June 1–12. Before Petersburg June 16–18. Siege of Petersburg and Richmond June 16 – September 5. Weldon Railroad June 22–23. Demonstration on north side of the James River at Deep Bottom July 27–29. Deep Bottom July 27–28. Mine Explosion July 30 (reserve). Demonstration on north side of the James August 13–20. Strawberry Plains, Deep Bottom, August 14–18.

== Casualties ==
The regiment lost a total of 320 men during service; 17 officers and 169 enlisted men killed or mortally wounded, 1 officer and 133 enlisted men died of disease.

== Commanders ==
- Colonel Alexander Hays
- Colonel Algernon Morgan - promoted from lieutenant colonel after Col Hays was promoted to brigadier general; he never returned to the regiment due to wounds received at the Battle of Seven Pines (discharged April 18, 1863)
- Colonel William S. Kirkwood - mortally wounded in action at the Battle of Chancellorsville less than two weeks after being promoted from lieutenant colonel
- Colonel John A. Danks

== Notable members ==
- Corporal John M. Kindig, Company A - Medal of Honor recipient for action at the Battle of Spotsylvania Court House

== See also ==
- List of Pennsylvania Civil War Units
- Pennsylvania in the Civil War
