= Patrick Stewart burial controversy =

United States Army soldier

Patrick D. Stewart
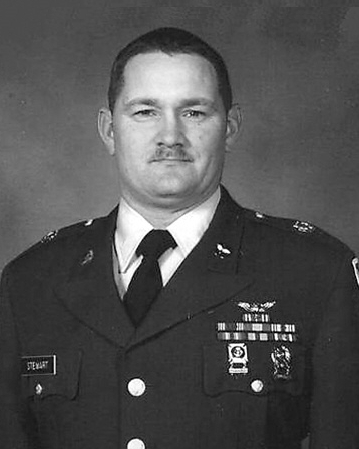
- Sergeant Patrick Dana Stewart
- Born: October 21, 1970; Reno, Nevada, U.S.
- Died: September 25, 2005 (aged 34); Dey Chopan District, Afghanistan
- Burial place: Fernley Nevada
- Military career
- Allegiance: United States of America
- Branch: United States Army
- Service years: 1989–2005
- Rank: Sergeant
- Conflicts: Persian Gulf War; War in Afghanistan
- Awards: Bronze Star Medal; Purple Heart; Army Achievement Medal

Patrick Dana Stewart (October 21, 1970 – September 25, 2005) was a soldier in the United States Army. He died in combat in Afghanistan when his Chinook helicopter was shot down by a rocket-propelled grenade while returning to base. Patrick Stewart was a resident of Fernley, Nevada, and a practicing Wiccan.

Following his death, controversy ensued over the Department of Veterans Affairs' (VA) initial refusal to imprint a pentacle on his grave due to Wiccan symbols not being a previously approved "emblem of belief." A case was filed against the VA which eventually led to the VA adding the pentacle to the approved list of emblems.

== Burial controversy ==
After his death, controversy ensued when the U.S. Department of Veterans Affairs (VA) initially refused to imprint a Wiccan pentacle on his grave, to the dismay of his widow, Roberta Stewart. The VA and its National Cemetery Administration prohibit graphics on government-furnished headstones or markers other than those they have approved as "emblems of belief", and Wicca was not then recognized for use in its cemeteries.

Roberta Stewart commented "remember that all freedoms are worth fighting for". At an alternative memorial service, assisted by Selena Fox, of the Circle Sanctuary, a Wiccan congregation, members of Patrick Stewart's Nevada Army National Guard unit and the Rev. Bill Chrystal, retired chaplain from Stewart's unit (Roberta was not allowed to speak at the regular Memorial Day Service at the Veterans Cemetery two miles away, prompting the alternative service), Sergeant Stewart's life was celebrated. Afterward, at the Northern Nevada Veterans Cemetery, Mrs. Stewart placed a blue wreath with a white pentacle in the center alongside the blank spot where Patrick's memorial marker would be attached when the pentacle symbol was approved.

On May 27, 2006, the Associated Press reported, "Over the years, families have used religious symbols such as the Jewish Star of David, the Christian cross and the Islamic crescent and star to honor their loved ones on headstones and markers. For Sgt. Patrick Stewart's family, the symbol of choice was also from his religion: the Wiccan pentacle. But of all the symbols and faiths recognized by the U.S. Department of Veterans Affairs, Wicca and its emblem, a circle around a five-pointed star, are not among them." According to federal guidelines, only approved religious symbols — of which there were 38 — can be placed on government headstones or memorial plaques.

Fox, senior minister of the Wiccan Circle Sanctuary in Barneveld, Wisconsin, is among those who pushed the federal government to adopt the emblem. Fox said "Veterans Affairs has been considering such requests for nearly nine years with no decision. While this stonewalling continues, families of soldiers who gave the ultimate sacrifice are still waiting for equal rights."

John W. Whitehead, President of the Rutherford Institute, wrote in his June 5, 2006, editorial on Christianity Today's website, "Although our country was founded on a Judeo-Christian base, the Framers of the Constitution understood that religious freedom was for everyone, not just Christians. In other words, the only way that freedom can prevail for Christians is for Christians to stand up and fight for the minority beliefs and religions of others."

=== Outcome ===
On September 13, 2006, the Attorney General of the state of Nevada opined that the state government had jurisdiction over state veterans' cemeteries, including the Northern Nevada Veterans Memorial Cemetery where Stewart was buried. State officials, led by Nevada Governor Kenny Guinn, said they would authorize the use of the plaque with the Wiccan symbol. It was installed over the weekend of November 18–19, 2006.

In the meantime, Americans United for Separation of Church and State filed litigation on Roberta Stewart's behalf in federal court. The lawsuit was filed on Nov. 13, 2006, and in the legal action, Americans United argued that the federal government was showing favoritism toward certain religions by maintaining a list of 38 religious symbols that could be used on headstones and memorial markers.

Attorneys with the VA approached Americans United and expressed an interest in settling the case. On April 23, 2007, Americans United held a press conference to announce that the case had been settled. As part of the settlement, the VA added the pentacle to the list of emblems allowed in national cemeteries and on VA-issued headstones, markers, and plaques.

== Presidential meeting ==
In August 2007 President Bush hosted a meeting with family members of those who had died in Iraq and Afghanistan, including members of Stewart's family. Although Roberta Stewart was not invited, President Bush later called to apologize.
