= Maximo Yabes =

US Army soldier during the Vietnam war

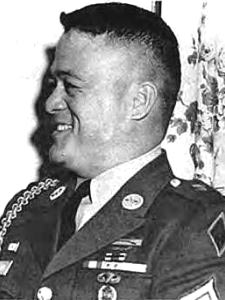
- First Sergeant Maximo Yabes
- Born: January 29, 1932; Lodi, California, U.S.
- Died: February 26, 1967 (aged 35); Tay Ninh Province, Republic of Vietnam
- Burial place: Fort Logan National Cemetery, Denver, Colorado
- Military career
- Allegiance: United States of America
- Branch: United States Army
- Service years: 1950–1967
- Rank: First Sergeant
- Nickname: "Max"
- Units: Company A, 4th Battalion, 9th Infantry, 25th Infantry Division
- Conflicts: Vietnam War (DOW)
- Awards: Medal of Honor; Purple Heart

Maximo Yabes (January 29, 1932 – February 26, 1967) born in Lodi, California, was a United States Army soldier who posthumously received the Medal of Honor — the United States' highest military decoration — for his actions near Phu Hoa Dong in South Vietnam during the Vietnam War. Yabes distinguished himself when he used his body as a shield to protect others in a bunker, moved two wounded men to a safer position where they could be given medical treatment and destroyed an enemy machine gun position before being mortally wounded.

== Early years ==
Yabes was born in Lodi, California, and at a young age moved with his family to Oakridge, Oregon, where he received his primary and secondary education. In 1950, he dropped out of Oakridge High School and joined the United States Army. He fought in Korea with the 187th Regimental Combat Team.

== Vietnam War ==
By 1967, Yabes was a First Sergeant with a total of 17 years in the Army. He was assigned to Company A, 4th Battalion, 9th Infantry, of the 25th Infantry Division in South Vietnam. The division had been stationed at Củ Chi Base Camp, northwest of Saigon, since January 1966.

Yabes' company — Alpha Company — was assigned to protect a squad of Army engineers whose assignment was to bulldoze a swath between the village and a plantation. The objective of this assignment was to deny the enemy ambushers and snipers the protective cover of the lush jungles.

On February 26, 1967, waves of Vietcong attacked Company A's position, blowing whistles and laying down deadly automatic weapons fire. The Vietcong, who penetrated the barbed wire perimeter, hurled grenades towards the command bunker. Yabes ran inside the bunker and covered its occupants with his body, all the while receiving wounds from numerous grenade fragments. Yabes then moved to another bunker and with a grenade launcher fired upon the enemy, halting a further penetration of the perimeter. Yabes then assisted two fallen comrades before he noticed an enemy machine gun within the perimeter which threatened the whole position. Yabes then proceeded to attack the enemy machine gun crew. He was able to kill the entire crew before falling mortally wounded. 24 American soldiers and over 113 Vietcong were killed in the attack.

Secretary of the Army, Stanley Resor, presented Yabes' wife and children with the Medal of Honor in a ceremony held at the Pentagon in October 1968.

== Medal of Honor citation ==
MAXIMO YABES
Rank and organization: First Sergeant, U.S. Army, Company A, 4th Battalion, 9th Infantry, 25th Infantry Division.
Place and date: Near Phu Hoa Dong, Republic of Vietnam, February 26, 1967.
Entered service at: Eugene, Oregon
Born: January 29, 1932, Lodi, California.

Citation:

For conspicuous gallantry and intrepidity at the risk of his life above and beyond the call of duty. 1st Sgt. Yabes distinguished himself with Company A, which was providing security for a land clearing operation. Early in the morning the company suddenly came under intense automatic weapons and mortar fire followed by a battalion sized assault from 3 sides. Penetrating the defensive perimeter the enemy advanced on the company command post bunker. The command post received increasingly heavy fire and was in danger of being overwhelmed. When several enemy grenades landed within the command post, 1st Sgt. Yabes shouted a warning and used his body as a shield to protect others in the bunker. Although painfully wounded by numerous grenade fragments, and despite the vicious enemy fire on the bunker, he remained there to provide covering fire and enable the others in the command group to relocate. When the command group had reached a new position, 1st Sgt. Yabes moved through a withering hail of enemy fire to another bunker 50 meters away. There he secured a grenade launcher from a fallen comrade and fired point blank into the attacking Viet Cong stopping further penetration of the perimeter. Noting 2 wounded men helpless in the fire swept area, he moved them to a safer position where they could be given medical treatment. He resumed his accurate and effective fire killing several enemy soldiers and forcing others to withdraw from the vicinity of the command post. As the battle continued, he observed an enemy machinegun within the perimeter which threatened the whole position. On his own, he dashed across the exposed area, assaulted the machinegun, killed the crew, destroyed the weapon, and fell mortally wounded. 1st Sgt. Yabes' valiant and selfless actions saved the lives of many of his fellow soldiers and inspired his comrades to effectively repel the enemy assault. His indomitable fighting spirit, extraordinary courage and intrepidity at the cost of his life are in the highest military traditions and reflect great credit upon himself and the Armed Forces of his country.

== Honors ==
First Sergeant Maximo Yabes was buried with full military honors at Fort Logan National Cemetery in Denver, Colorado.

Dozens of individuals, businesses and organizations in Oakridge, Oregon, donated time, money, labor and supplies to build a memorial to honor Yabes. They hired sculptor Tim Outman to create the memorial which features a fountain, a flagpole and a bronze bust with the likeness of Yabes set on a granite pedestal. Engraved on the base are the details of Yabes' Medal of Honor exploits. The memorial is located in Greenwaters Park, on the east side of Oakridge, south of highway 58. The city of El Paso, Texas, also honored Yabes by naming an avenue after him. His name can be found on panel 15E, line 102 of the Vietnam Memorial Wall in Washington, D.C.

== Awards and recognitions ==
Among Maximo Yabes' decorations and medals were the following:

Combat Infantryman Badge
Medal of Honor
Purple Heart	Army Good Conduct Medal, 5 awards	National Defense Service Medal
Vietnam Service Medal w/ 2 Service stars	Vietnam Gallantry Cross with Palm	Vietnam Campaign Medal
Parachutist Badge		Expert Marksmanship Badge with Rifle and Pistol Component Bar

25th Infantry Division CSIB
9th Infantry Regiment DUI
Infantry Shoulder Cord
1 Overseas Service Bar
4 Service stripes

== See also ==
- List of Medal of Honor recipients
- List of Medal of Honor recipients for the Vietnam War
- Hispanic Medal of Honor recipients
