= Southern Nevada Veterans Memorial Cemetery =

Cemetery in Boulder City, Nevada, US

Coordinates: 35°56′44″N 114°50′50″W

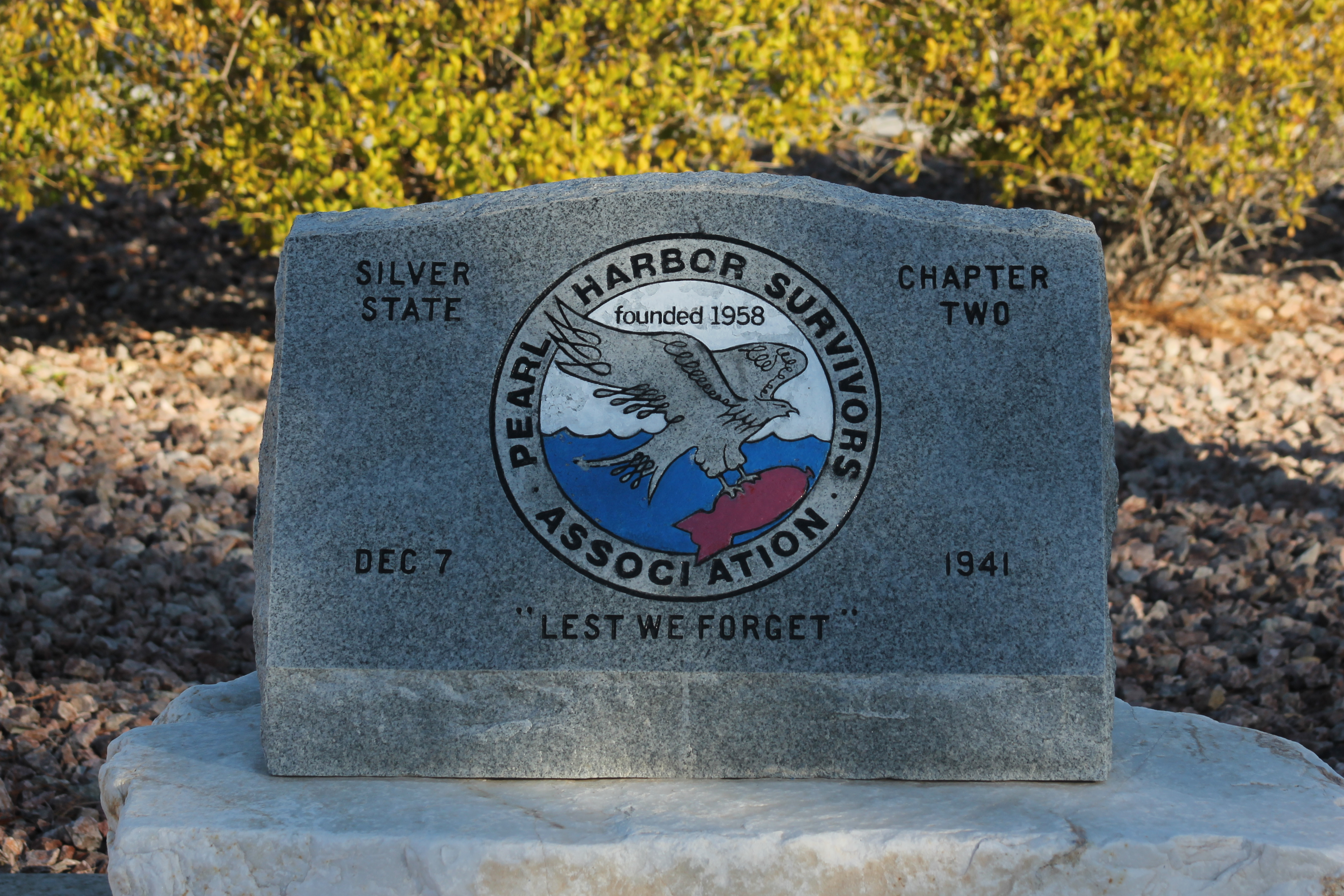
- A Pearl Harbor Survivors Association stone at the Southern Nevada Veterans Memorial Cemetery
- Interactive map of Southern Nevada Veterans Memorial Cemetery

Details
- Location: Boulder City, Nevada
- Size: 79 acres (32 ha)
- No. of interments: 42,964

The Southern Nevada Veterans Memorial Cemetery is located in Boulder City, Clark County, Nevada. Established in 1990, the 79-acre cemetery is approximately 30 miles southeast of Las Vegas, Nevada. This is one of two state operated Veterans Cemeteries, the other is the Northern Nevada Veterans Memorial Cemetery 437 miles away in Fernley, Nevada. The cemetery was constructed to serve Military Veterans and their families. The nearest Veterans Memorial Cemetery to Boulder City Nevada is the Riverside National Cemetery in Riverside California, about 245 miles from the Las Vegas Valley.

As of December 2014, 42,964 veterans and family members (spouses) are interred at one of the two Nevada Veterans Memorial Cemeteries located in either Fernley or Boulder City, Nevada. The cemeteries at both locations were built and expanded using grants awarded by the US Department of Veterans Affairs (VA). Each state is responsible for operating each of their Veterans Cemeteries after the VA assists with the construction. The State of Nevada provides staff and operating costs to oversee the facility and is supported by a VA.

== About ==
The Department of Veterans Affairs is adding burial space at the fastest rate since the Civil War as interments of veterans and their dependents increase. This increase has come as the generation of World War II Veterans are now into their golden years. The State of Nevada has more than 300,000 veterans and is among the fastest growing region in the Western United States of people age 65 or older with the demographic of military veterans. The eligibility for burial in either the Southern Nevada Veterans Memorial Cemetery or the Northern Nevada Veterans Memorial Cemetery is based on the same criteria as burial in any VA National Cemetery, regardless of the state of residence.

== Notable individuals ==
- Martin Azarow (1934–2003), actor
- Pamela Blake (1915–2009), actress
- Sonny Bupp (1928–2007), actor, World War II veteran, United States Army
- Donal Neil "Mike" O'Callaghan (1929–2004), Nevada Governor
- Abe Woodson (1934–2014), football player
