= Mountain View Cemetery =

Mountain View Cemetery may refer to:

== Canada ==
- Mountain View Cemetery (Vancouver)

== United States ==
- Mountain View Cemetery (Oakland, California)
- Mountain View Cemetery (Columbus, Montana)
- Mountain View Cemetery (Ashland, Oregon)
- Mountain View Cemetery (Oregon City, Oregon)
