= John M. Kindig =

American Civil War Medal of Honor recipient

- Born: East Liberty, Pennsylvania, US
- Died: September 17, 1869
- Burial place: Allegheny Cemetery; Pittsburgh, Pennsylvania, US
- Military career
- Allegiance: United States of America
- Branch: United States Army
- Rank: Corporal
- Units: Company A, 63rd Pennsylvania Infantry
- Conflicts: American Civil War; Battle of Spotsylvania Court House
- Awards: Medal of Honor

John M. Kindig (died September 17, 1869) was a Union Army soldier in the American Civil War who received the U.S. military's highest decoration, the Medal of Honor.

== Biography ==
Kindig was born in the Pittsburgh suburb of East Liberty, and entered service at Wilkins Township, Pennsylvania. He was awarded the Medal of Honor, for extraordinary heroism shown in Spotsylvania County, Virginia, for capturing the flag of the Confederate States Army's 28th North Carolina Infantry during the Battle of Spotsylvania Court House, while serving as a corporal with Company A, 63rd Pennsylvania Infantry. His Medal of Honor was issued on May 12, 1864.

Kindig died from tuberculosis on November 17, 1869 and was buried in the historic Allegheny Cemetery in Pittsburgh.

== Medal of Honor citation ==
The President of the United States of America, in the name of Congress, takes pleasure in presenting the Medal of Honor to Corporal John M. Kindig, United States Army, for extraordinary heroism on 12 May 1864, while serving with Company A, 63d Pennsylvania Infantry, in action at Spotsylvania, Virginia, for capture of flag of 28th North Carolina Infantry. (Confederate States of America).
