= Northern Nevada Veterans Memorial Cemetery =

Veterans cemetery in Nevada

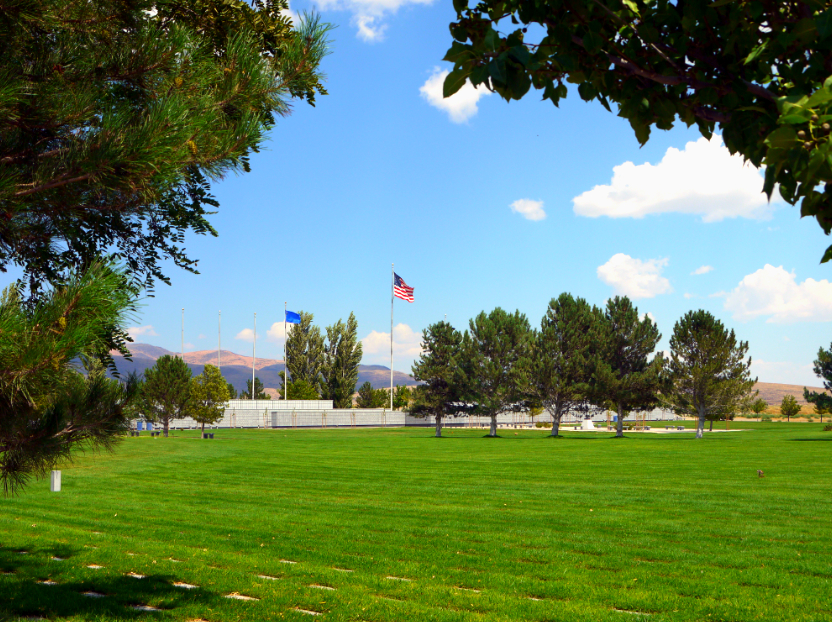
- Northern Nevada Veterans Cemetery (2016)
- Interactive map of Northern Nevada Veterans Memorial Cemetery

Details
- Established: 1990
- Location: Lyon County, Nevada,
- Country: United States of America
- Coordinates: 39°37′09″N 119°13′49″W
- Type: Public
- Size: 43 acres (17 ha)
- No. of graves: 13,000+
- Find a Grave: Northern Nevada Veterans Memorial Cemetery

The Northern Nevada Veterans Memorial Cemetery opened in 1990 under the administration of the Nevada Office of Veterans Services. The Northern Nevada Veterans Cemetery is funded by the State of Nevada and the National Cemetery Association. The cemetery is 35 miles east of Reno and is adjacent to Interstate 80, in Fernley, Nevada.

== History ==
In 1978, Congress established the State Cemetery Grants Program (Public Law 95-476) to aid States and U.S. territories in the establishment, expansion and improvement of veterans cemeteries. In 1987, The Nevada State Legislature approved funding for two cemeteries, one located in Northern Nevada and one located in Southern Nevada (Southern Nevada Veterans Memorial Cemetery). Both Nevada Cemeteries opened in 1990 under the administration of the Nevada Commission for Veterans Affairs, and both are funded by the State of Nevada. As of December 2014, a total of 42,964 veterans and family members have been interred at one of the two Nevada's Veterans Memorial Cemeteries in either Boulder City or Fernley Nevada. As of 2015, the Veterans Affairs Cemetery Administration is conducting one of the largest expansions of military cemeteries since the American Civil War.

On September 13, 2006, Nevada's Governor, Kenny Guinn, put forward that the State had jurisdiction over state veterans' cemeteries. The Northern Nevada Veterans Memorial Cemetery was involved in the debate over the use of non-traditional graphics on government-furnished headstones and markers. The grave site of Sergeant Patrick Dana Stewart located at the Northern Nevada site became the first veterans cemetery to display the Wiccan symbol. Eventually the symbol was added to the list of emblems allowed in national cemeteries throughout the United States including VA-issued headstones, markers, and plaques.

A ceremony honoring fallen soldiers is held in the cemetery each year on Memorial Day. In 2016, the remains of sixteen unclaimed veterans were interred in the cemetery, and a service was held in their honor.

== Grounds ==
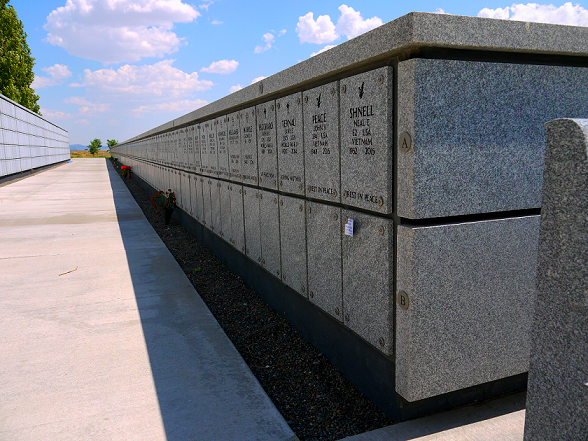
Columbarium Steps leading to flags facing northeast

The 43 acre cemetery sits below the mountains of the Northern Nevada Trinity Mountain Range. The cemetery grounds consist of irrigated landscaping with a mix of trees, turf and shrubbery. All buildings and monuments are ADA accessible with ramps leading to the main flag, the POW-MIA flag and the State of Nevada flag at the northern end of the columbarium.

== Challenges ==
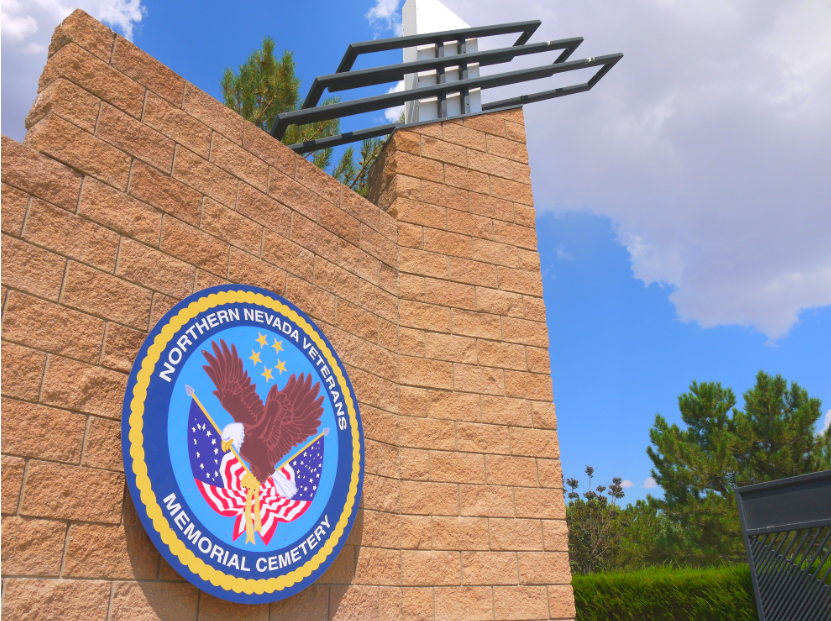
Front gate facing north in Fernley

Water availability and cost present challenges at both Northern Nevada and Southern Nevada Memorial Cemeteries. Charles Harton, a retired World War II Marine and chairman of the Northern Nevada Veterans Memorial Cemetery Advisory Committee stressed the importance of reviewing cost effective approaches to water usage including the incorporation of desert xeriscaping involving the use of native plants and shrubs collide with view that visitors prefer turf as most appropriate for a veterans cemetery. The Northern Nevada Memorial Cemetery is the first Memorial Cemetery in Nevada to test the long term feasibility of a polymer material embedded within the soil for capturing and retaining moisture by limiting water evaporation in dry arid environments.

== Notable burials ==
- Martin Brandtner (1938–2017), United States Marine Corps lieutenant general.
