= Ike Klingbeil =

American ice hockey player (1908–1995)

- Born: November 3, 1908 Hancock, Michigan, United States
- Died: June 17, 1995 (aged 86) Colorado Springs, Colorado, United States
- Height: 5 ft 10 in (178 cm)
- Weight: 180 lb (82 kg; 12 st 12 lb)
- Position: Defence
- Shot: Left
- Played for: Chicago Black Hawks
- Playing career: 1933–1941

Ernest Rudolph "Ike" Klingbeil (November 3, 1908 – June 17, 1995) was an American ice hockey player. He played 5 games in the National Hockey League with the Chicago Black Hawks during the 1936–37 season. The rest of his career, which lasted from 1933 to 1941, was spent in minor leagues.

== Biography ==
A native of Hancock, Michigan, Klingbeil played the position of Defense. Klingbeil played for the Michigan Wolverines from 1932 to 1933 (MOHL), Detroit Mundus from 1933 to 1934 (MOHL), Detroit Farm Crest from 1934 to 1935 (MOHL), Detroit Tool Shop (MOHL), Chicago Black Hawks from 1936 to 1937 (NHL), and Portage Lakes Lakers from 1936 to 1940. A lifelong member of the American Legion in Hancock, Michigan, and the Immanuel Lutheran Church, Klingbeil also served as a Corporal in the United States Army Air Corps during World War II.

Klingbeil died in Colorado Springs, Colorado, in a military hospice, at the age of 86. He was buried in Fort Logan National Cemetery, Denver, Colorado.

== Career statistics ==
=== Regular season and playoffs ===
			Regular season					Playoffs
Season	Team	League	GP	G	A	Pts	PIM	GP	G	A	Pts	PIM
1932–33	University of Michigan	NCAA	—	—	—	—	—	—	—	—	—	—
1933–34	Detroit Mundus	MOHL	11	5	1	6	27	6	2	2	4	24
1934–35	Detroit Farm Crest	MOHL	16	3	1	4	26	1	1	0	1	0
1935–36	Detroit Tool Shop	MOHL	5	2	0	2	4	—	—	—	—	—
1936–37	Chicago Black Hawks	NHL	5	1	2	3	2	—	—	—	—	—
1936–37	Portage Lakes Hockey Club	NMHL	—	—	—	—	—	—	—	—	—	—
1937–38	Portage Lakes Hockey Club	NMHL	—	—	—	—	—	—	—	—	—	—
1938–39	Portage Lakes Hockey Club	NMHL	—	—	—	—	—	—	—	—	—	—
1939–40	Portage Lakes Elks	NMHL	—	—	—	—	—	—	—	—	—	—
1940–41	Portage Lakes Elks	NMHL	—	11	8	19	—	—	—	—	—	—
NHL totals			5	1	2	3	2	—	—	—	—	—
