= Thomas Kindig =

Austrian footballer

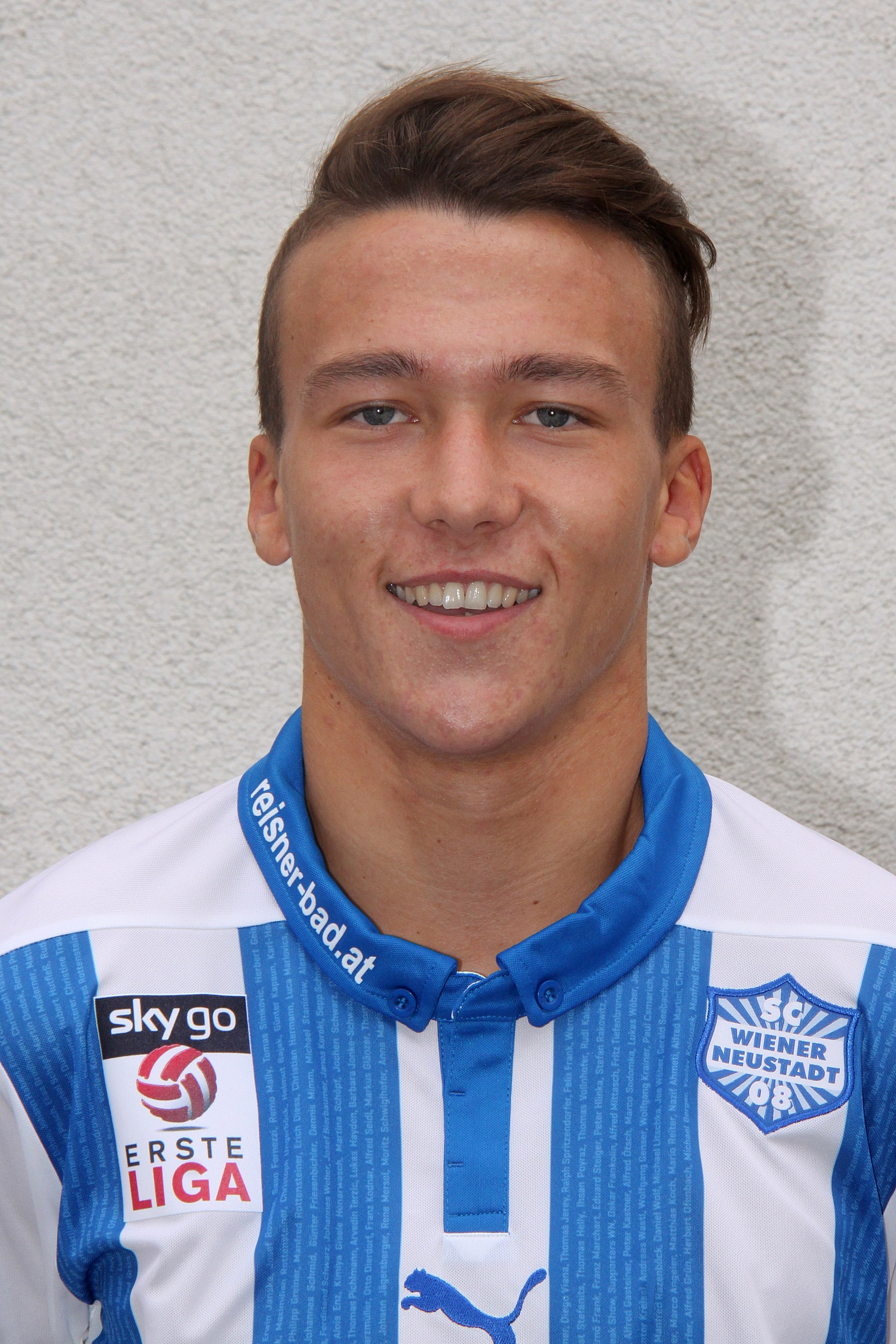
- Kindig in 2015

Personal information
- Date of birth: 16 October 1996 (age 30)
- Place of birth: Austria
- Height: 1.70 m (5 ft 7 in)
- Position: Midfielder

Team information
- Current team: Sportunion Mauer
- Number: 23

Youth career
- –2012: Admira Wacker

Senior career*
Years	Team	Apps	(Gls)
2012–2017	Wiener Neustadt II	34	(6)
2015–2017	Wiener Neustadt	9	(0)
2017–2020	First Vienna	52	(1)
2020–	Sportunion Mauer	137	(3)
- * Club domestic league appearances and goals as of 28 June 2026

Thomas Kindig (born 16 October 1996) is an Austrian footballer who plays for Sportunion Mauer.
