= Richard H. Kindig =

American photographer

Richard H. Kindig (February 2, 1916 – April 7, 2008) was an American photographer who specialized in photographing the rail transport industry in Colorado.

Kindig began photographing the railroads of Colorado in August 1933, and documented the change from steam to diesel locomotives throughout the state. He was most known for his photographs of the narrow gauge railways of the state. Kindig was the first recipient of the Railway and Locomotive Historical Society's Photography Award in 1984. On March 1, 2008, the Colorado Railroad Museum honored his work in a special ceremony attended by Colorado Governor Bill Ritter; the Governor declared the day Richard H. Kindig Day in honor of his work. That ceremony was his last public appearance.

He was interred at Fort Logan National Cemetery, Englewood, Colorado.
