= Fort Logan National Cemetery =

Historic veterans cemetery in Denver, Colorado

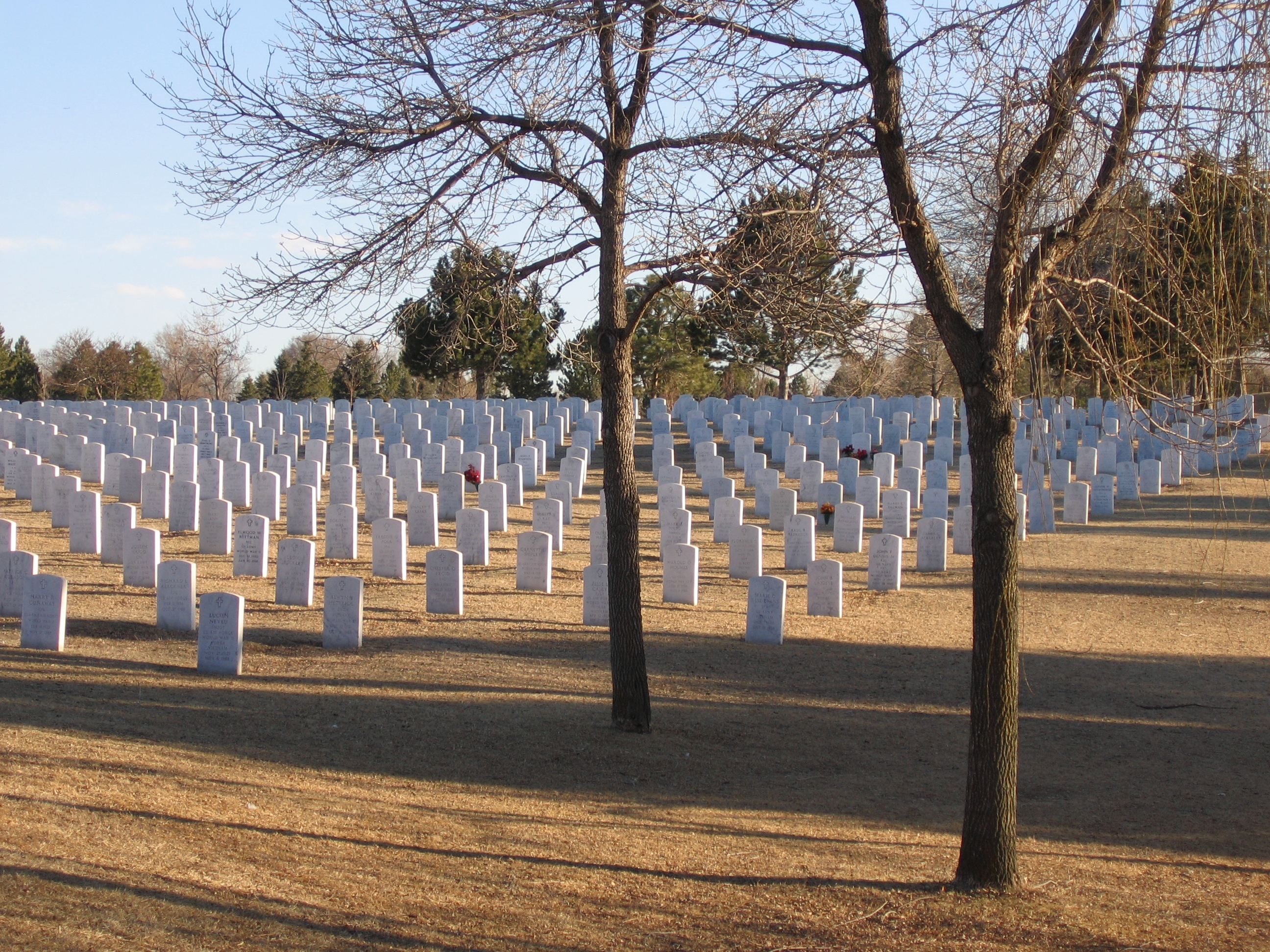
- Fort Logan National Cemetery
- Interactive map of Fort Logan National Cemetery

Details
- Established: 1887
- Location: Denver, Colorado
- Country: United States
- Coordinates: 39°38′49″N 105°02′53″W
- Type: United States National Cemetery
- Size: 214 acres (0.87 km^{2})
- No. of graves: >148,000
- Website: Official
- Find a Grave: Fort Logan National Cemetery

Fort Logan National Cemetery is a United States National Cemetery in Denver, Colorado. Fort Logan, a former U.S. Army installation, was named after Union General John A. Logan, commander of US Volunteer forces during the American Civil War. It contains 214 acres (87 ha) and has over 122,000 interments as of 2014. It was listed on the National Register of Historic Places in 2016.

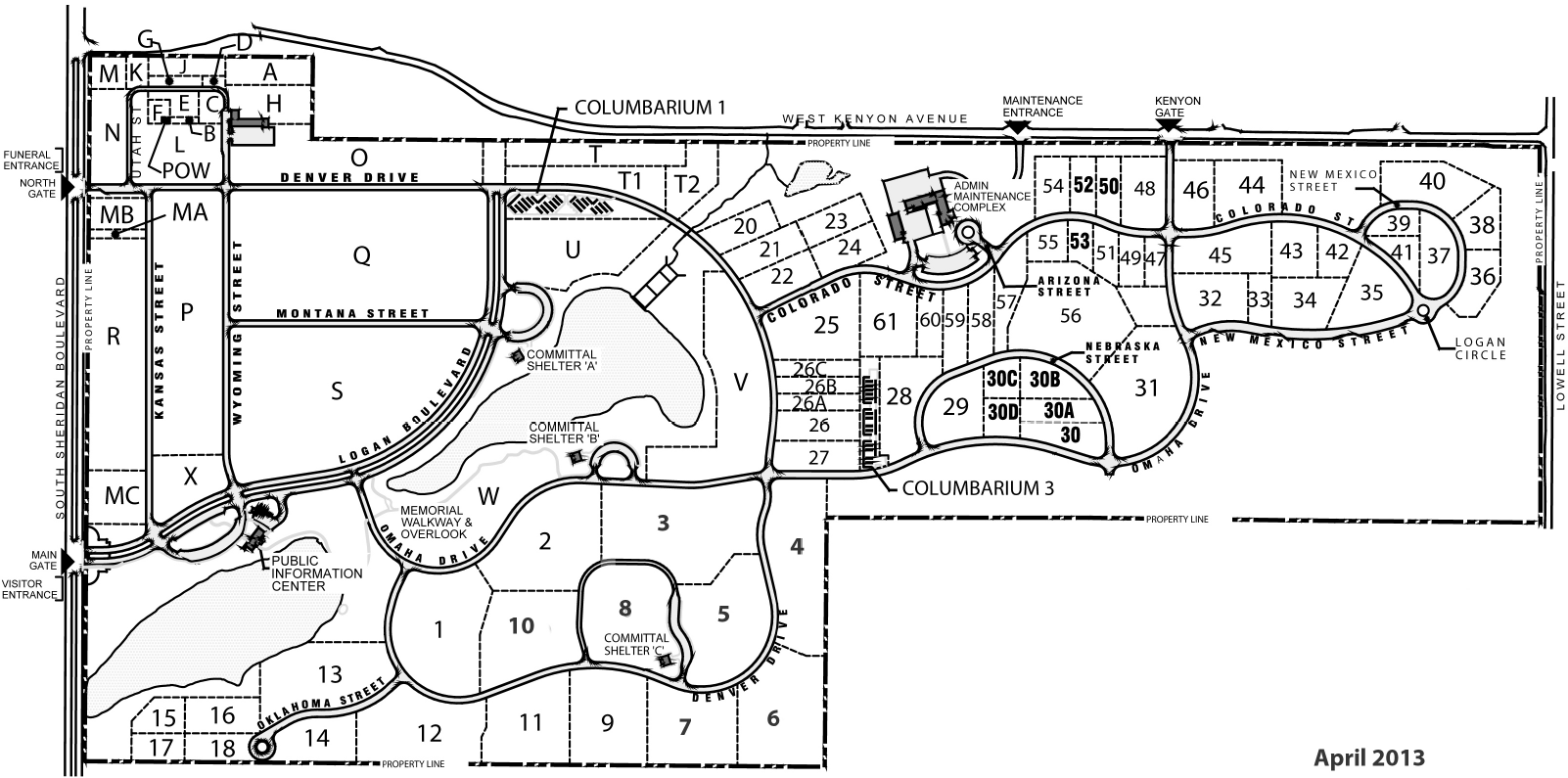
Fort Logan National Cemetery Map

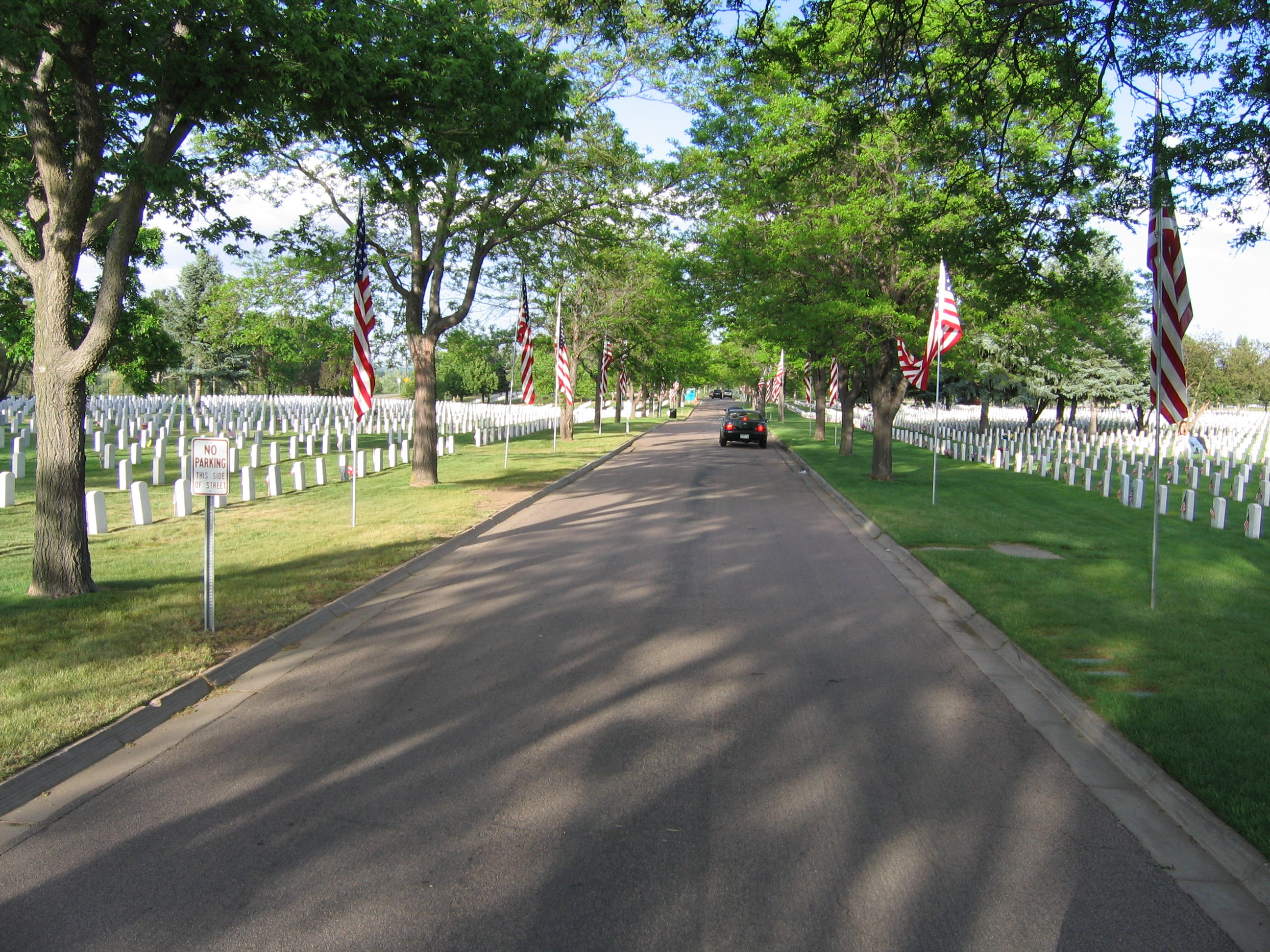
A street in Fort Logan National Cemetery during Memorial Day weekend

== History ==
Fort Logan itself was established on October 31, 1887, and was in continuous use until 1946 when most of the acreage except for the cemetery was turned over to the state of Colorado. The national cemetery was created in 1950.

== Notable burials ==
- Medal of Honor recipients
  - Major William E. Adams (1939–1971) – U.S. Army, Company A, 227th Aviation Battalion (Assault Helicopter); 52d Aviation Battalion (Combat), 1st Aviation Brigade. Kontum Province, Republic of Vietnam.
  - Private John Davis (1838–1901) – Company F, 17th Indiana Mounted Infantry. Culloden, Georgia, April 1865 (Civil War) (cenotaph)
  - First Sergeant Maximo Yabes (1932–1967) – U.S. Army, Company A, 4th Battalion, 9th Infantry, 25th Infantry Division. Phu Hoa Dong, Republic of Vietnam
- Others
  - George R. Caron (1919–1995) – tail gunner on the Enola Gay
  - John A. Carroll (1901–1995) – United States Representative and Senator
  - Joanne Conte (1933–2013) – Transgender woman. As Joseph Baione, Conte served as a military Morse code operator for the U.S. Army and Air Force during the Korean War.
  - John F. Curry (1886–1973) – Major General and first commander of the Civil Air Patrol
  - Steven Curnow (1984–1999) – Columbine High School massacre victim. Aspired to join the Air Force after graduation.
  - Danny Dietz (1980–2005) – US Navy Seal. Littleton CO native, perished in Operation Red Wings.
  - Arthur Harvey (1895–1976) – oil pioneer and a veteran of World War I and World War II
  - Byron "Mex" Johnson (1911–2005) – Negro league baseball player
  - Richard H. Kindig (1916–2008) – photographer noted for documenting the rail transport industry of Colorado and the Rocky Mountains
  - Ernest Klingbeil (1908–1995) – professional hockey player
  - Fitzroy Newsum (1918–2013) – original member of the Tuskegee Airmen
  - John Powers Severin (1921-2012) -- renowned comic book artist (notably for EC Comics, Marvel Comics and Cracked)
  - Dorothy L. Starbuck (1917–1996) – Women's Army Corps officer and Veteran's Administration civil servant.
  - Karl H. Timmermann (1922–1951) – commanded the unit which captured the Rhine River's Ludendorff Bridge at Remagen during World War II
  - Kyle Velasquez (1982–1999) – Columbine High School massacre victim. Aspired to join the Navy after graduation.

== Gallery ==
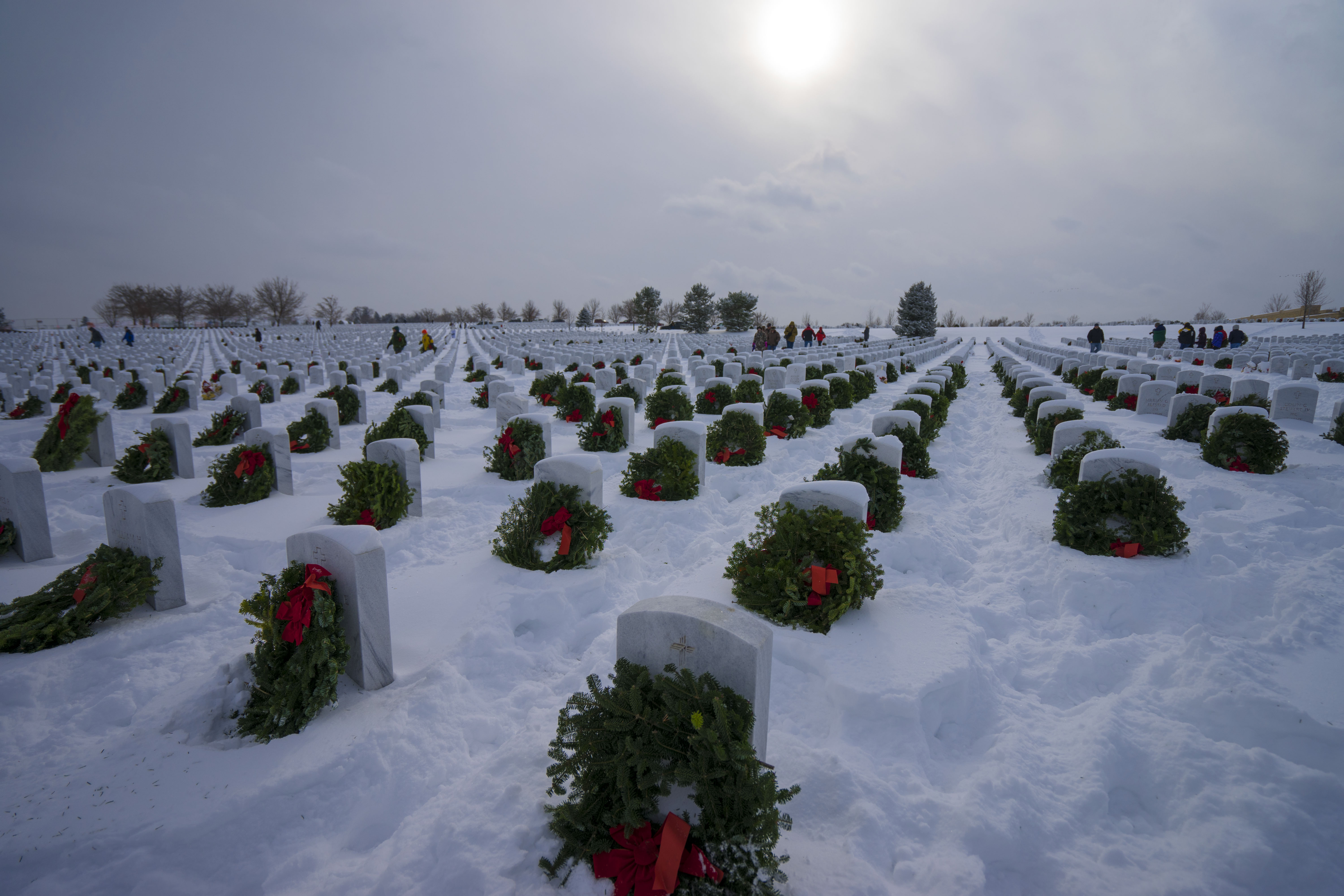
Wreaths placed at headstones

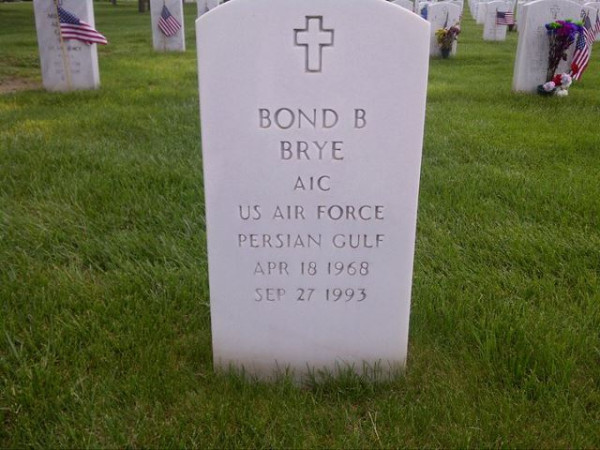
Bond Brye

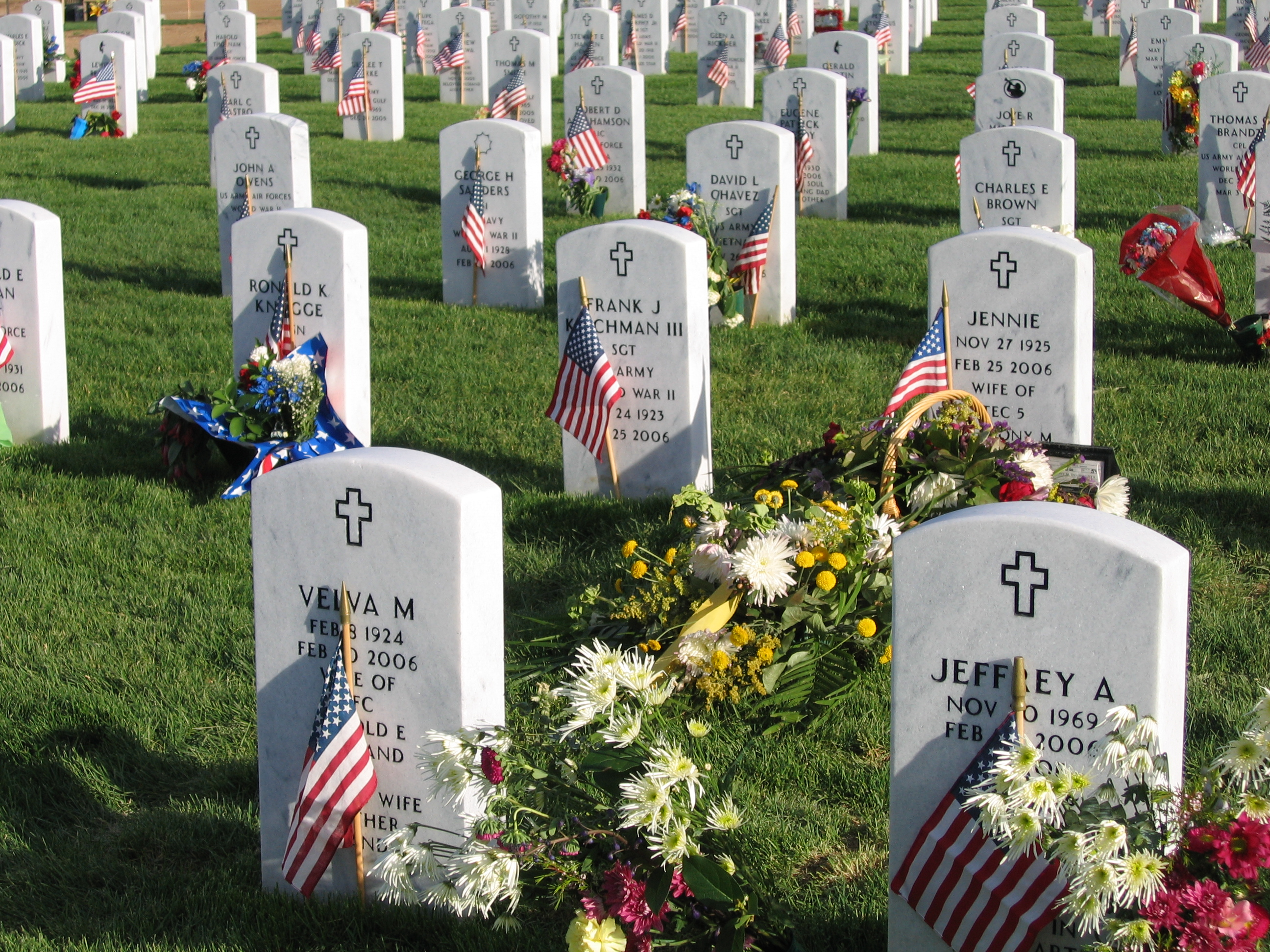
Graves in a newer section

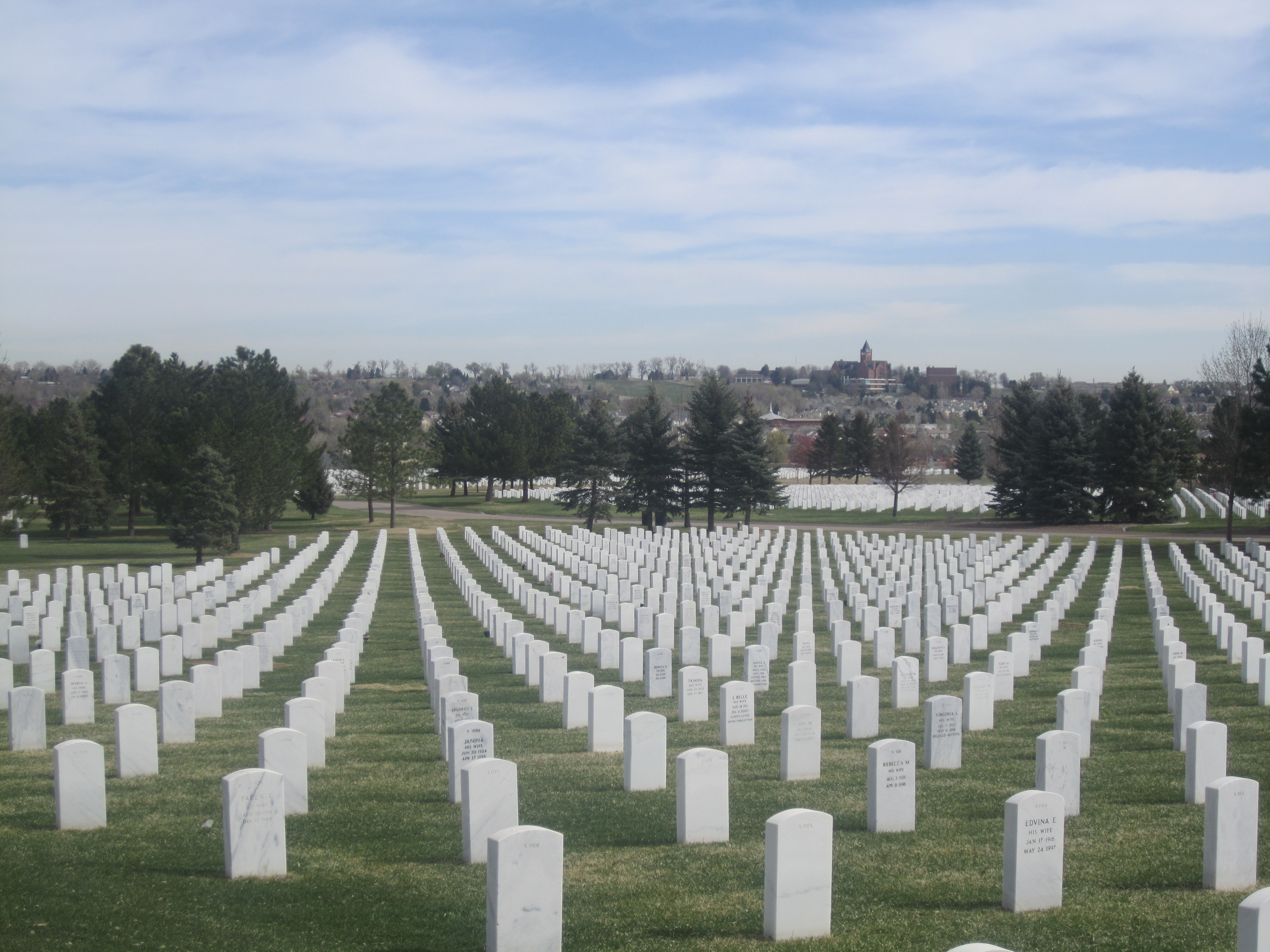
Fort Logan National Cemetery, April 5, 2012

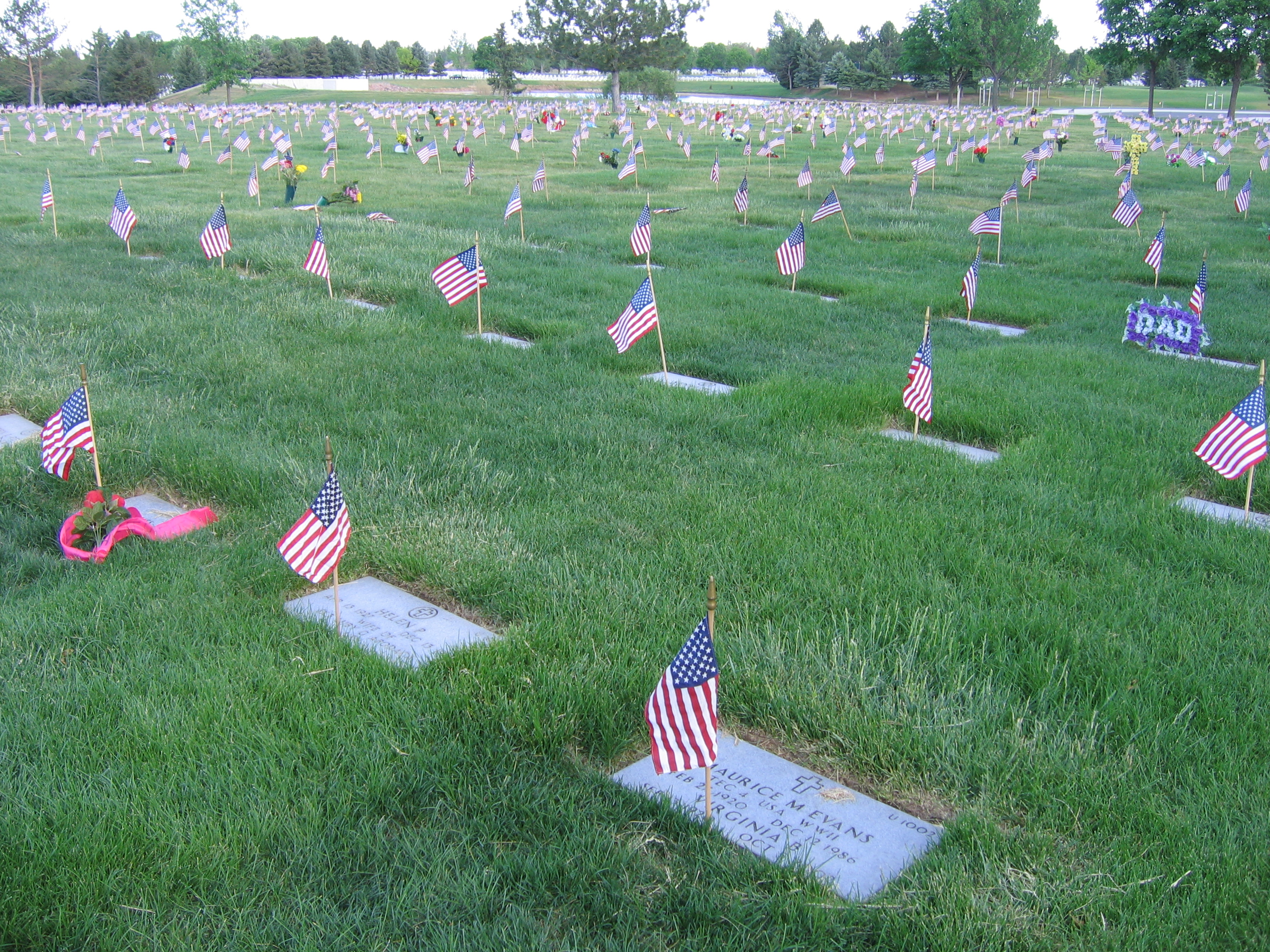
Flags placed on graves, Memorial Day 2006

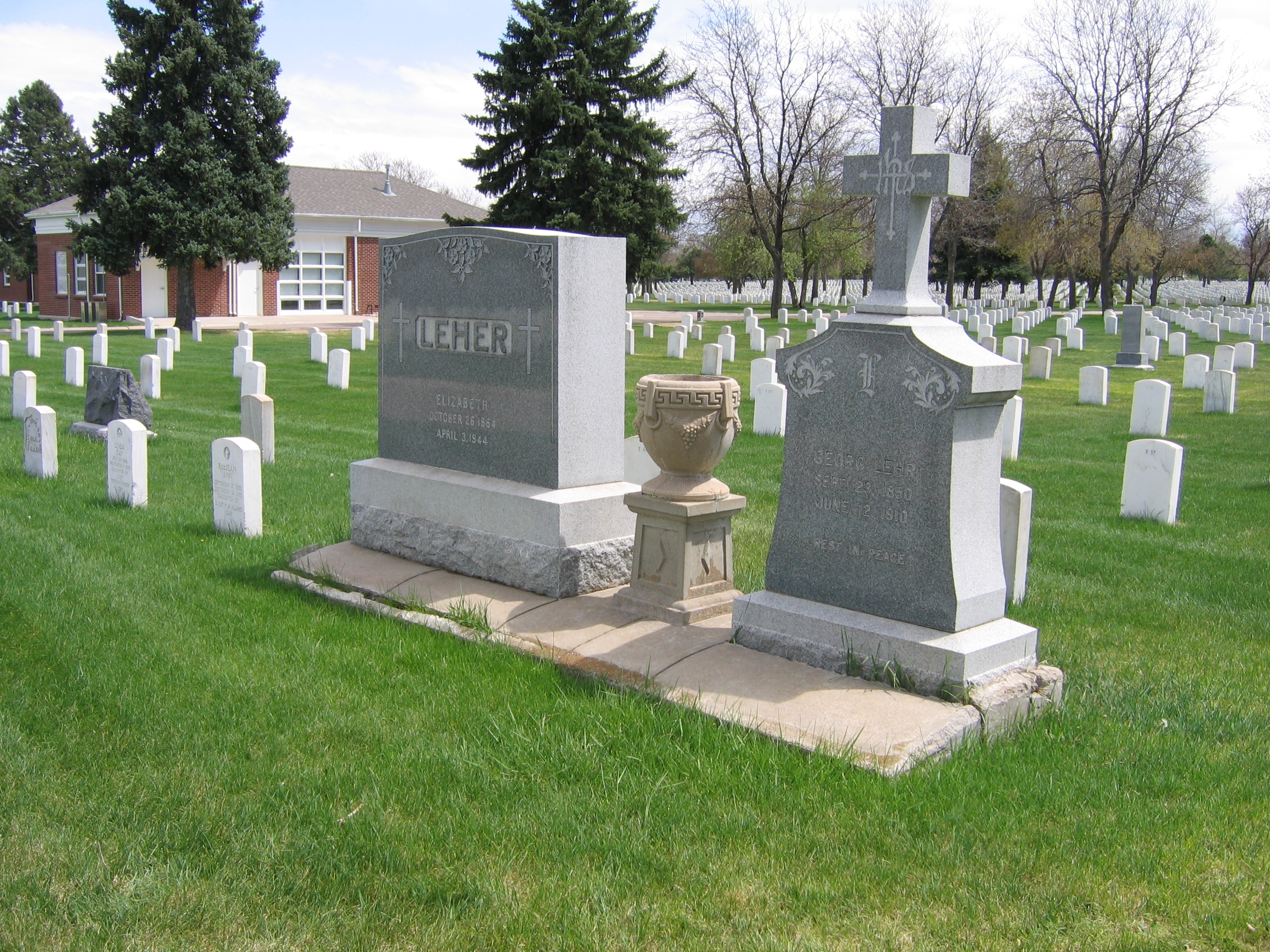
Graves in the older section

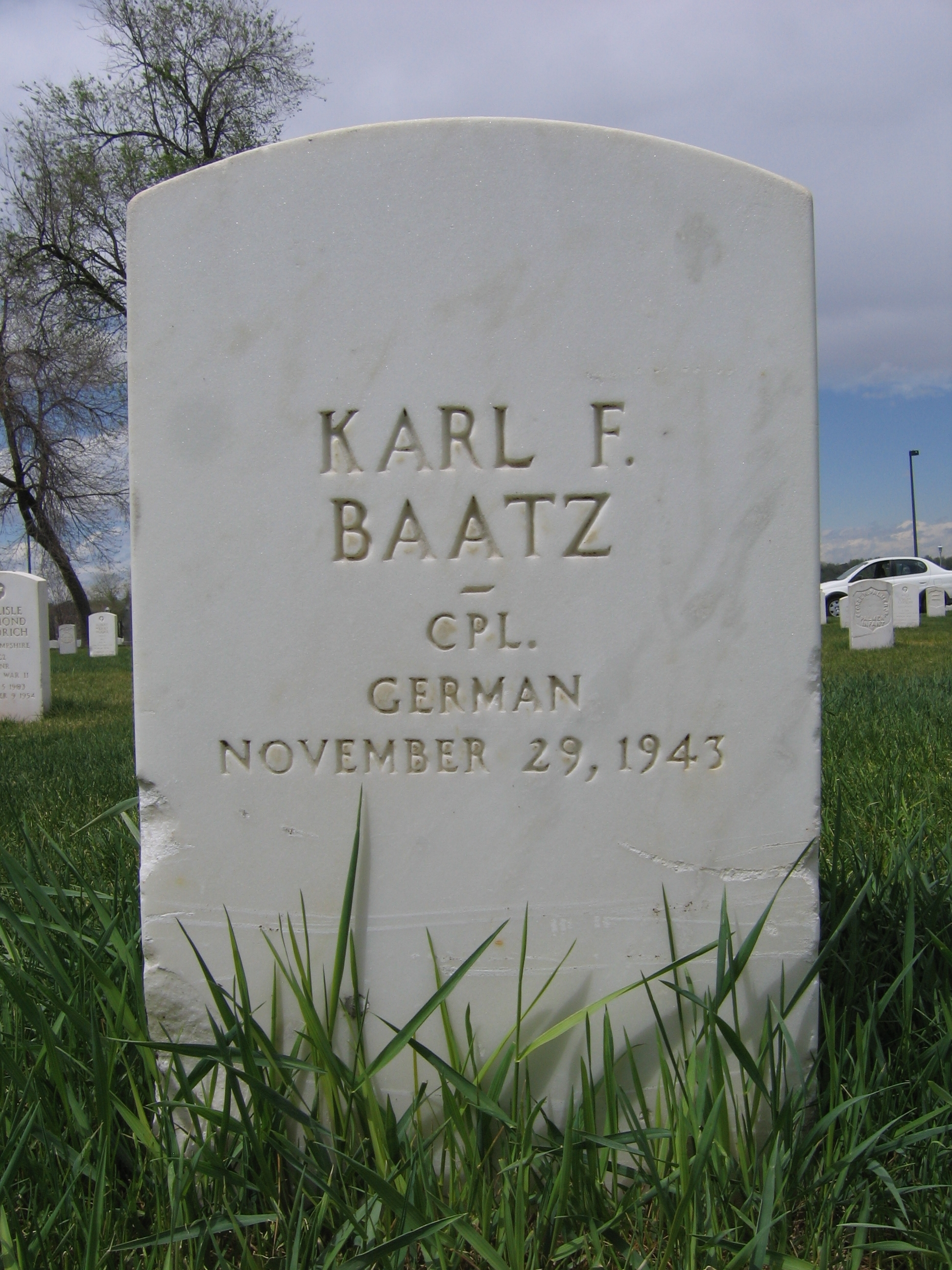
Grave of Karl F. Baatz, a German World War II POW

== See also ==
- National Register of Historic Places listings in West Denver
- List of cemeteries in Colorado
