= Small Talk (1929 film) =

1929 Our Gang short film by Robert F. McGowan

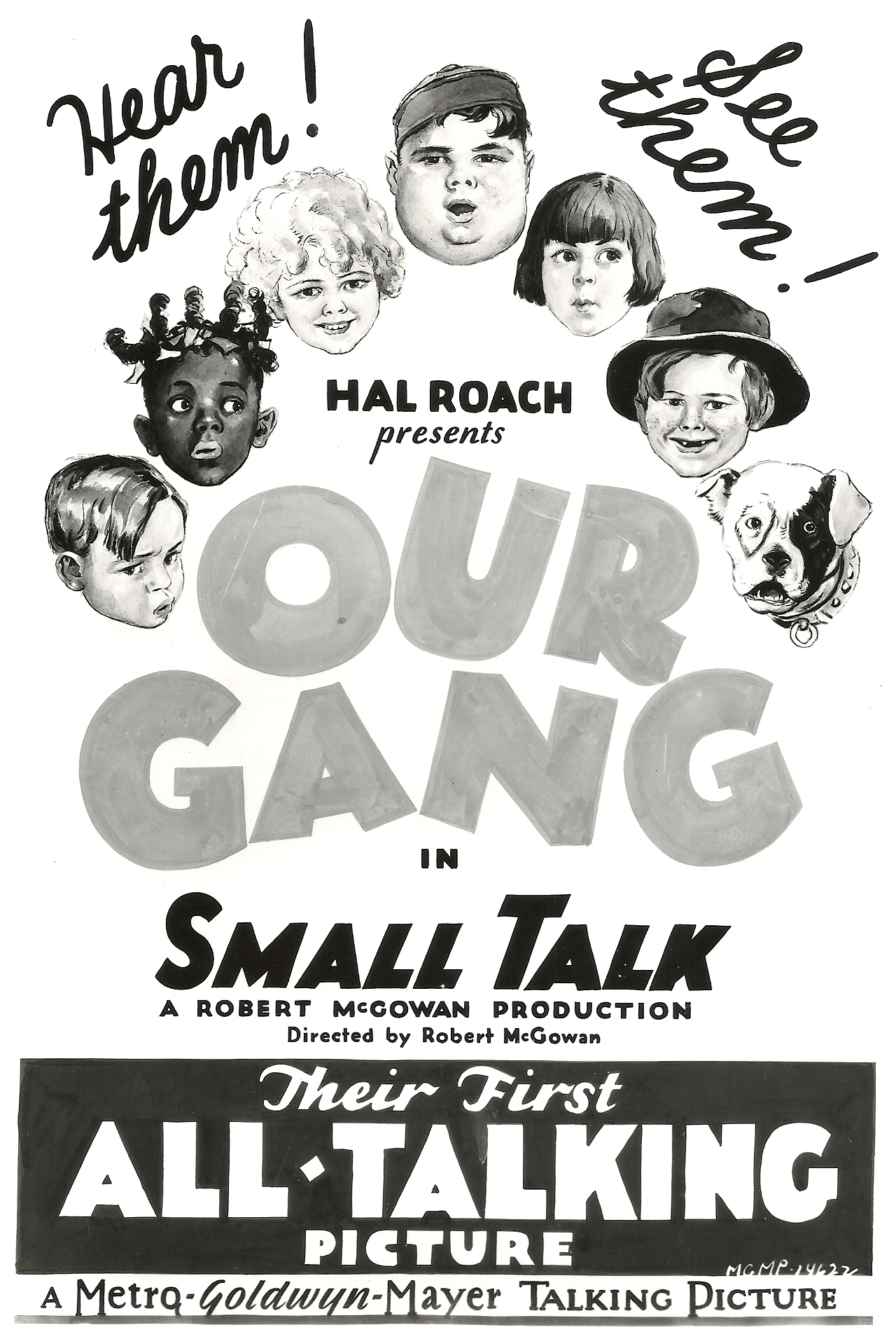
- Directed by: Robert McGowan
- Written by: H.M. Walker (dialogue)
- Produced by: Robert McGowan
- Starring: Bobby "Wheezer" Hutchins; Mary Ann Jackson; Allen "Farina" Hoskins; Joe Cobb; Harry Spear; Jean Darling; Pete the Pup
- Cinematography: Art Lloyd and F.E. Hershey
- Edited by: Richard Currier
- Production companies: Hal Roach presents His Rascals' Voices; A Robert McGowan Production
- Distributed by: Metro-Goldwyn-Mayer
- Release date: May 18, 1929
- Running time: 24:57
- Country: United States
- Language: English

Small Talk is a 1929 American Our Gang comedy short film, the 86th in the series, directed by Robert McGowan. It is the first film in the series to be produced with sound.

== Plot ==
Small Talk (1929)

The gang are all orphans hoping to be adopted by nice families where "spinach is not on the menu". Wheezer, the youngest child, is adopted by a wealthy couple, while his older sister Mary Ann is not. The gang visit Wheezer in his new home, triggering an alarm that summons the police and the fire department. Wheezer's new mother decides to adopt Mary Ann as well. The couple's friends all each adopt a child as well, even Farina, who is adopted by the maid at Wheezer's new home. Pete the Pup starts Miss Eddy's player piano and sits listening to "There's a Rainbow 'Round My Shoulder".

== Production order ==
Released on May 18, 1929, Small Talk (production #89) was preceded in production by the final silent entry, Saturday's Lesson (production #88), which was released more than five months later, on November 9. The entry produced after Small Talk, Railroadin' (production #90), was released on June 18.

== Production notes ==
Small Talk is the first sound entry in the Our Gang series, and the only sound Our Gang film to span three reels, with a length of 25 minutes. Three additional silent shorts produced before the release of Small Talk, Little Mother, Cat, Dog & Co. and Saturday's Lesson, were released afterward. The film was originally part of the Little Rascals television syndication package from the 1950s until the 1980s, when it was dropped from the package over concerns about its length and sound quality.

== Cast ==
=== The Gang: Hal Roach presents His Rascals' Voices ===
Uncredited (listed in order of on-screen time)

- Bobby "Wheezer" Hutchins
- Mary Ann Jackson
- Allen "Farina" Hoskins
- Joe Cobb
- Jean Darling
- Harry Spear
- Pete the Pup

=== Adults in the cast ===
Uncredited (in order of appearance)

- Lyle Tayo as Mrs. Brown, proprietress of Mrs. Brown's Home for Children
- Helen Jerome Eddy as Miss Eddy, high-society lady who adopts Wheezer
- Edith Fortier as Miss Eddy's servant who accompanies her to the orphanage
- Mary Emery as Miss Eddy's high-society friend playing cards at a table with her and two other society ladies; she adopts Jean
- Symona Boniface as Miss Eddy's high-society friend playing cards at a table with her and two other society ladies; she adopts Joe
- Viola Porter as Miss Eddy's high-society friend playing cards at a table with her and two other society ladies; she has her arm around Harry
- Emmett King as doctor called by Miss Eddy to examine Wheezer who is not sick but misses his sister
- Pat Harmon as police officer who runs into Miss Eddy's mansion and takes a pratfall on a rug
- Charles McMurphy as police officer who asks, "Did you kids turn in all these fire and police alarms around here?"
- Frona Hale as Miss Eddy's society guest who comes into the hallway with the other three society ladies to ask why the emergency vehicles arrived. When Farina asks her about adopting him, she replies, "No, sweetheart, I'm afraid not"
- Emma Reed as Miss Eddy's maid who sees Farina crying and tells him, "Honeylamb, dry all o'them big tears... so you can take a good look at your new mammy"

== See also ==
- Our Gang filmography
