= A Tough Winter =

1930 short film by Robert F. McGowan

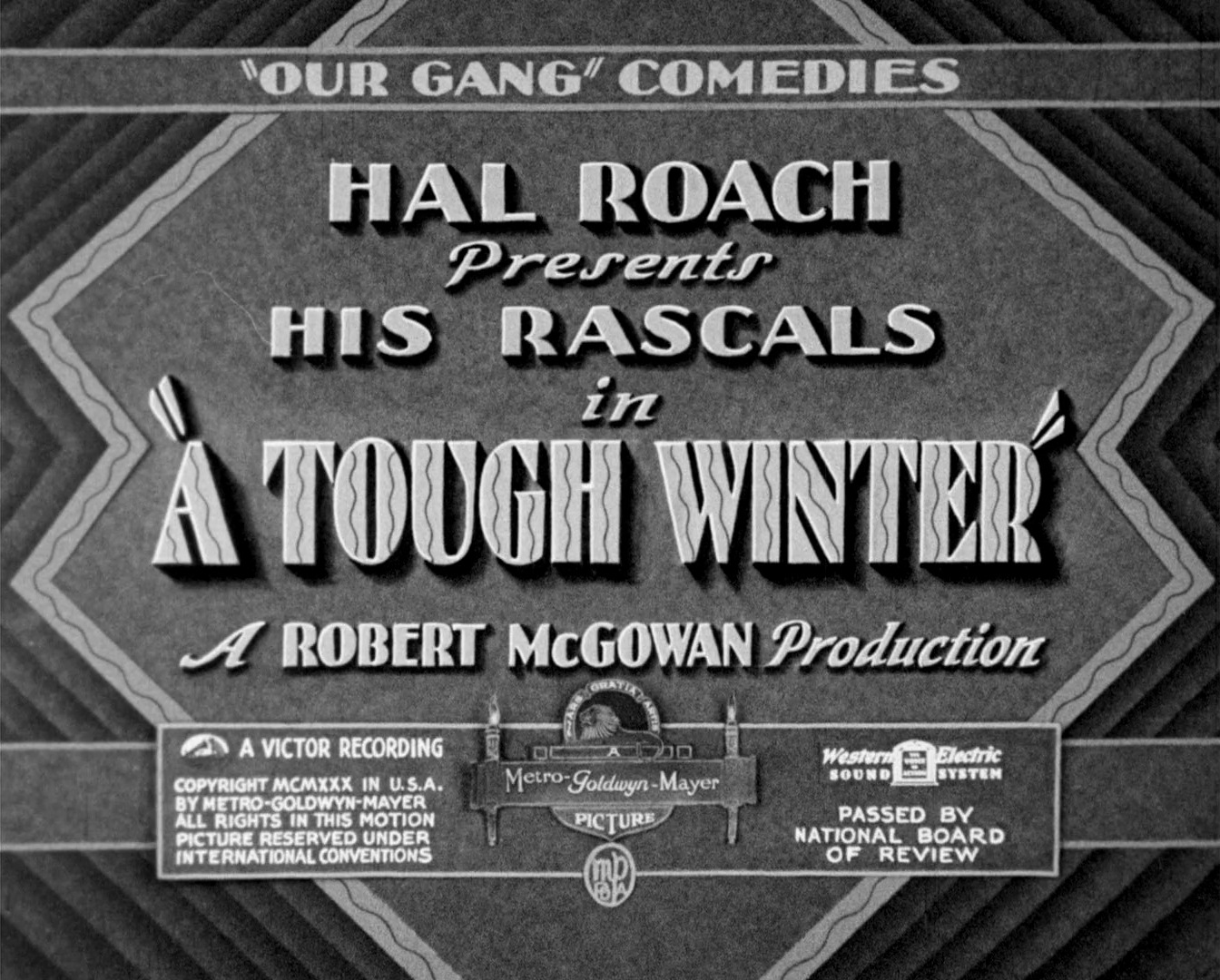
- Directed by: Robert F. McGowan
- Written by: Robert A. McGowan; H. M. Walker
- Produced by: Robert F. McGowan; Hal Roach
- Starring: Allen Hoskins; Mary Ann Jackson; Bobby Hutchins; Jackie Cooper; Norman Chaney; Pete the Pup
- Cinematography: Art Lloyd
- Edited by: Richard C. Currier
- Music by: Ray Henderson; Marvin Hatley
- Distributed by: MGM
- Release date: June 21, 1930
- Running time: 20' 22"
- Country: United States
- Language: English

A Tough Winter is a 1930 Our Gang short comedy film, the 99th in the series, directed by Robert F. McGowan.

== Plot ==
A Tough Winter (1930)

The gang goes to Wheezer and Mary Ann's house for a taffy pull, but they botch the recipe and make a huge mess. They attempt to clean it and ask Stepin Fetchit to help, but he crosses wires, plumbing and gas lines. As a result, light bulbs pop, water sprays from gas heaters, a phone acts as a vacuum cleaner and music plays from the icebox.

== Cast ==
=== The Gang ===
- Norman Chaney as Chubby
- Jackie Cooper as Jackie
- Allen Hoskins as Farina
- Bobby Hutchins as Wheezer
- Mary Ann Jackson as Mary Ann
- Beverly Parrish as Girl with Mary Ann
- Warner Weidler as Our Gang member
- Wolfgang Weidler as Our Gang member
- Pete the Pup as himself
- Dinah the Mule as herself
- Tommy Atkins as Toddler (unconfirmed)

=== Additional cast ===
- Stepin Fetchit as Stepin
- Lyle Tayo as Miss Radio

== Production ==
The first Pete the Pup was poisoned by an unknown assailant after this film.

Stepin Fetchit had signed a one-year contract with Hal Roach Studios to appear with the gang in nine episodes during the 1930-31 season. His character was included in the scripts for several episodes, including Pups Is Pups, Helping Grandma and Little Daddy, but his contract was canceled for unknown reasons and the Our Gang series continued without him.

Because of perceived racial insensitivities, A Tough Winter was eliminated from the syndicated Little Rascals television package in 1971.

Beverly Parrish was signed for two years to replace Jean Darling, who had been dismissed six months earlier, but she died suddenly a week and a half after this episode was filmed. Shirley Jean Rickett replaced her several episodes later, although she lasted only half a season.

This was the last episode to feature an orchestral music scoring, and the last to feature the theme song "That Old Gang of Mine" in the credits. The film also was the first to feature Leroy Shield's jazz-style pieces that would become an integral part of future Our Gang films.

== See also ==
- Our Gang filmography
