= Saturday's Lesson =

1929 film

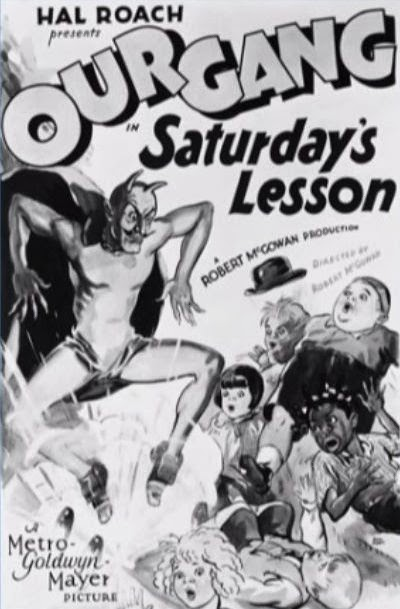
- Film poster
- Directed by: Robert F. McGowan
- Written by: Robert F. McGowan; H. M. Walker
- Produced by: Hal Roach
- Cinematography: Art Lloyd
- Edited by: Richard C. Currier
- Distributed by: MGM
- Release date: November 9, 1929
- Running time: 17' 40"
- Country: United States
- Language: Silent with English intertitles

Saturday's Lesson is a 1929 Our Gang short silent comedy film, the 93rd in the series, directed by Robert F. McGowan. It is the final silent film in the series. As with two previous silent Our Gang shorts, Little Mother and Cat, Dog & Co., Saturday's Lesson was withheld until after several sound Our Gang films had been released.

== Cast ==
The film

=== The Gang ===
- Joe Cobb as Joe
- Jean Darling as Jean
- Allen Hoskins as Farina
- Bobby Hutchins as Wheezer
- Mary Ann Jackson as Mary Ann
- Harry Spear as Harry
- Pete the Pup as himself

=== Additional cast ===
- Orpha Alba as Joe's mom
- Jack O'Brien as The Devil
- Emma Reed as Farina's mom
- Adele Watson as The Other Kids' mom
- Charley Young as Dr. A.M. Austin
- Allan Cavan - Pedestrian #2
- Ham Kinsey - Pedestrian #1

== See also ==
- Our Gang filmography
