= Shivering Shakespeare =

1930 short film by Anthony Mack

- Directed by: Anthony Mack
- Written by: Robert F. McGowan
- Produced by: Robert F. McGowan; Hal Roach
- Starring: Norman Chaney; Mary Ann Jackson; Jackie Cooper; Allen Hoskins; Bobby Hutchins; Edith Fellows; Douglas Greer; Donald Haines; Jack McHugh; Malcolm Sebastian; Pete the Pup; Edgar Kennedy; Lyle Tayo; Allen Cavan; Dorothy Coburn; Carlton Griffin
- Cinematography: Art Lloyd
- Edited by: Richard C. Currier
- Music by: Ray Henderson
- Distributed by: Metro-Goldwyn-Mayer
- Release date: January 25, 1930
- Running time: 20:19
- Country: United States
- Language: English

Shivering Shakespeare is an Our Gang short film, the 95th in the series, directed by Anthony Mack.

== Plot ==
Shivering Shakespeare (1930)

The gang participates in a play entitled The Gladiator's Dilemma, written, produced and directed by the wife of Kennedy the Cop. The badly written play goes comically wrong as the kids forget their lines, miss their cues and deal with unwieldy props and costumes. The audience members, unruly teenage boys, mercilessly heckle the kids and torment them by throwing food. Everyone in the auditorium participates in a pie fight. Mrs. Kennedy observes the debacle and orders everyone to stop. However, Mr. Kennedy nods, giving them permission, and all of the kids throw their pies at Mrs. Kennedy.

== Production ==
Shivering Shakespeare was the final Our Gang comedy directed by Robert A. McGowan, who was billed as Anthony Mack to differentiate himself from his uncle, Robert Francis McGowan, the Our Gang series' producer and senior director. The younger McGowan would remain a part of the Our Gang unit as a writer for the rest of its existence, even after the series was sold to MGM in 1938.

== Cast ==
=== The Gang ===
- Norman Chaney as Chubby / Nero
- Jackie Cooper as Jackie / the Christian
- Allen Hoskins as Farina / Farinacus
- Bobby Hutchins as Wheezer / Mary Annicus' youthful brother
- Mary Ann Jackson as Mary Ann / Mary Annicus
- Pete the Pup as himself

=== Additional cast ===
- Edith Fellows as Screaming kid
- Douglas Greer as Curtain puller
- Donald Haines as giggling guard / Shepherd
- Jack McHugh as Teenager
- Gordon Thorpe as Effeminate boy
- Bobby Mallon as Shepherd / guard
- Jerry McGowan as Dancing girl
- Malcolm Sebastian as Wizard
- Johnny Aber as Teenager
- Georgie Billings as Shepherd / guard
- Bradley "Buster" Slaven as Shepard/guard
- Allen Cavan as Audience member who "resents it"
- Dorothy Coburn as Pie sale girl
- Carlton Griffin as man inside bull costume
- Harry Keaton as Audience member licking lips
- Edgar Kennedy as Kennedy The Cop
- Ham Kinsey as Audience member hit by pie
- Charles McAvoy as man whose son is splattered
- Gertrude Sutton as Mrs. Kennedy
- Lyle Tayo as Chubby's mother
- Helen Gilmore as Audience member
- Buddy Moore as Undetermined role

== See also ==
- Our Gang filmography
