= When the Wind Blows (1930 film) =

1930 film

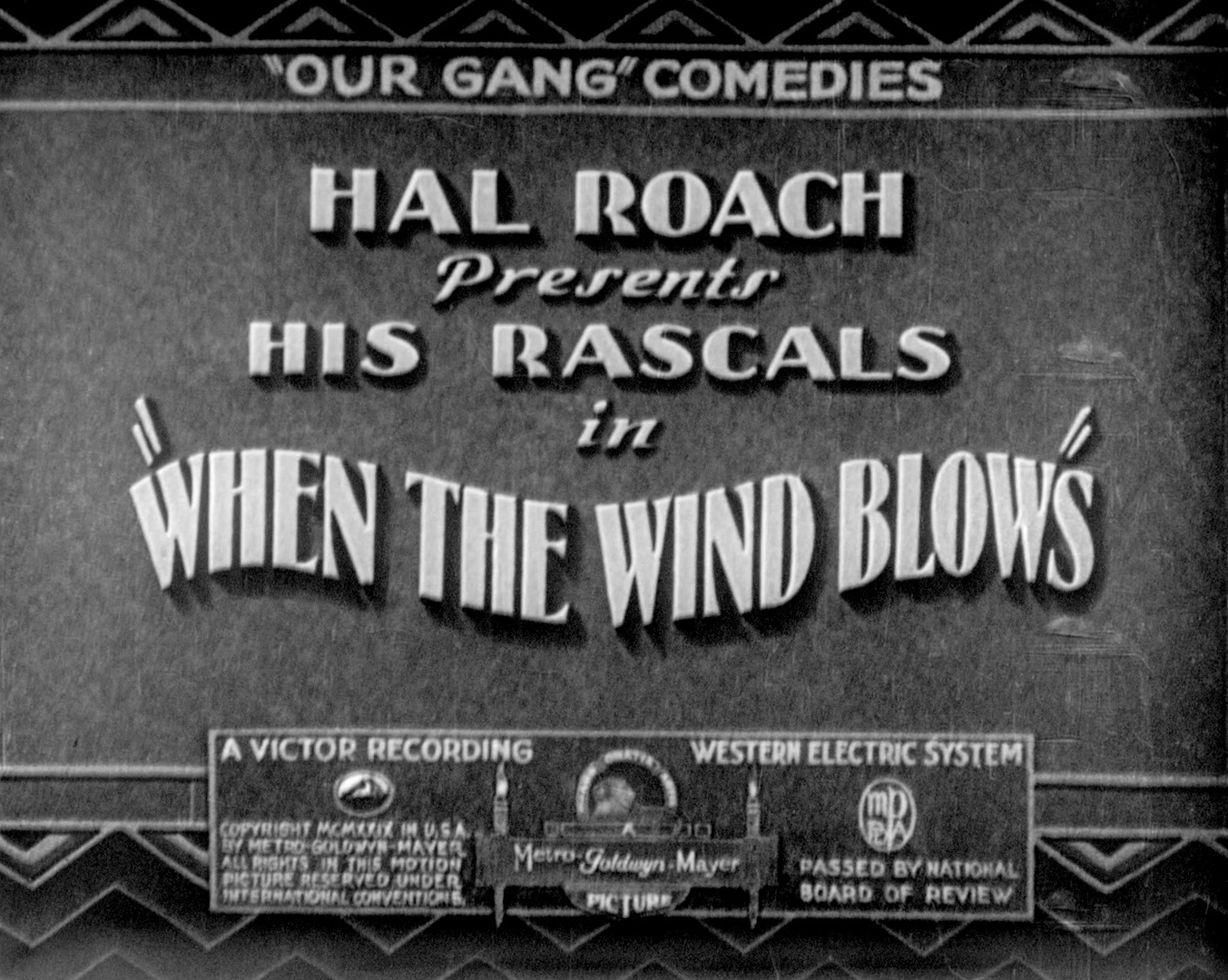
- Directed by: James W. Horne
- Written by: Robert A. McGowan
- Produced by: Robert F. McGowan; Hal Roach
- Starring: Jackie Cooper; Bobby Hutchins; Allen Hoskins; Norman Chaney; Mary Ann Jackson; Pete the Pup
- Cinematography: Art Lloyd
- Edited by: Richard C. Currier
- Music by: Ray Henderson
- Distributed by: MGM
- Release date: April 5, 1930
- Running time: 19:35
- Country: United States
- Language: English

When the Wind Blows is a 1930 Our Gang short comedy film, the 97th in the series, directed by James W. Horne.

== Plot ==
When the Wind Blows (1930)

On a windy spring night, a man tells Kennedy the Cop that it is a fine night for a murder. Farina is frightened and left at home to mind his baby brother in a ramshackle house with windows so weak that the wind blows through. A few doors down, Jackie is spanked by his father for refusing to finish his homework, with his little brother Wheezer laughing at him. Jackie throws his schoolbook out the window.

From his bed, Jackie overhears his parents discussing that he is a great kid. Jackie is touched by this sentiment and climbs through the window to retrieve his book, but when he tries to return, he cannot open the window. His loud attempts startle his parents, who call the police. Jackie runs to Farina's house but frightens Farina when he tries to enter. Farina is so frightened into hiding, so Jackie heads to Chubby's house. Jackie tries to rouse Chubby by throwing something at his window, but he breaks the window, awakening Chubby and his parents. Jackie returns home and enters Wheezer's room through another window, but Wheezer's dog Pete pushes Jackie back out again. Next door, Mary Ann wakes up. Jackie enters her room, but she forces him to leave. As he falls from Mary Ann's window, he lands on a real burglar, knocking the burglar unconscious, and Jackie is considered a hero.

== Cast ==
=== The Gang ===
- Norman Chaney as Chubby
- Jackie Cooper as Jackie
- Allen Hoskins as Farina
- Bobby Hutchins as Wheezer
- Mary Ann Jackson as Mary Ann
- Pete the Pup as Himself

=== Additional cast ===
- Betty Jane Beard - Hector
- Chet Brandenburg - Flustered man
- Mary Gordon - Chubby's mother
- Edgar Kennedy - Kennedy the Cop
- Charles McAvoy - Henry, Jackie's dad
- Emma Reed - Farina's mother
- Julian Rivero - Henry, Jackie's dad (Spanish language version)

== Production ==
When the Wind Blows is the first Our Gang film to feature a music score, an orchestral mix of popular songs (including "My Man"), not the jazz-based scores typical of Our Gang films. The film also marks Edgar Kennedy's final Our Gang appearance.

All scenes with Farina were deleted in 1970 from the Little Rascals television package because of perceived racial tones, but they were reinstated for AMC's airings of the film.

== See also ==
- Our Gang filmography
