= Lazy Days (film) =

1929 short film by Robert F. McGowan

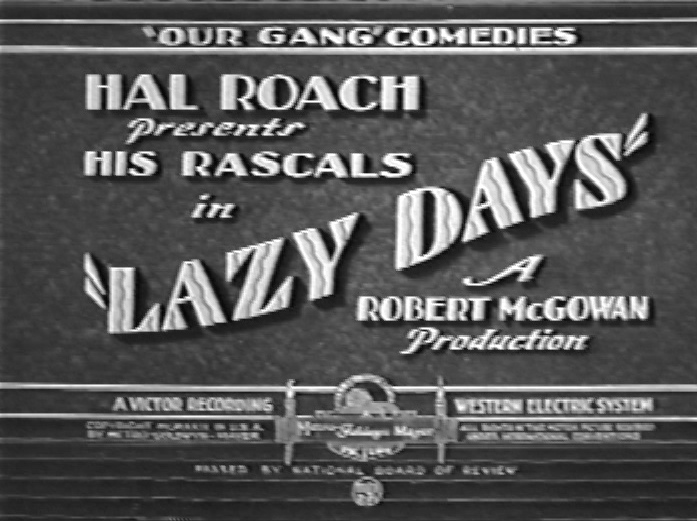
- Directed by: Robert F. McGowan
- Written by: Robert A. McGowan
- Produced by: Robert F. McGowan; Hal Roach
- Starring: Allen Hoskins; Jannie Hoskins; Junior Allen; Joe Cobb; Norman Chaney; Mary Ann Jackson; Harry Spear; Jean Darling
- Cinematography: F. E. Hershey; Art Lloyd
- Edited by: Richard C. Currier
- Distributed by: MGM
- Release date: August 24, 1929
- Running time: 20' 00"
- Country: United States
- Language: English

Lazy Days is a 1929 Our Gang short comedy film, the 89th in the series, directed by Robert F. McGowan.

== Plot ==
Lazy Days (1929)

Farina lazily minds his baby brother and his girlfriend Trellis waits for him. The rest of the gang are preparing their younger brothers and sisters for entry in a $50 baby contest, including Joe's crude attempt to present 11-year-old Chubby as an infant. When Farina learns about the contest, he slowly begins bathing and dressing his younger brother. On the way to the contest, Farina has a mishap with the stroller. After laying down to rest, he learns from Joe that the contest was actually held more than a month ago.

== Cast ==
=== The Gang ===
- Joe Cobb as Joe
- Jean Darling as Jean
- Allen Hoskins as Farina
- Bobby Hutchins as Wheezer
- Mary Ann Jackson as Mary Ann
- Harry Spear as Harry
- Pete the Pup as himself

=== Additional cast ===
- Junior Allen as Thermos/Junior, Farina's brother
- Jannie Hoskins as Trellis, Farina's girlfriend

== Production notes ==
Farina's younger sister Jannie, who had appeared in several of the silent Our Gang films, appears in the film as his girlfriend Trellis. This was her first of only two appearances in Our Gang sound films; the other is Teacher's Beau.

Lazy Days was one of several Our Gang films deleted from King World's Little Rascals television package in 1971 because of material some considered racially offensive or insensitive. Because of its depiction of black Farina as what some considered to be stereotypically lazy, the short has been withheld from television since the 1970s, although it has been released on home video. Although the film is still under copyright, it occasionally surfaces in mutilated form on bootleg/public-domain home video releases.

== See also ==
- Our Gang filmography
