= Norman Chaney =

American child actor (1914–1936)

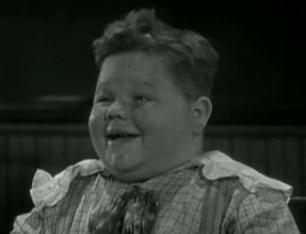
- Chaney as Chubby in School's Out
- Born: Norman Myers Chaney; October 18, 1914; Cambridge, Maryland, U.S.
- Died: May 29, 1936 (aged 21); Baltimore, Maryland, U.S.
- Occupation: Film actor
- Years active: 1929–1931

Norman Myers Chaney (October 18, 1914 – May 29, 1936) was an American child actor, notable for appearing in 19 Our Gang comedies as "Chubby" from 1929 to 1931.

== Early life and career ==
Chaney was born on October 18, 1914 in Cambridge, Maryland, and became a member of Our Gang at the dawn of the sound era. He relied on an affable personality, a flair for funny dialogue, and a priceless frown of frustration. In the fall of 1928, Our Gang producer Hal Roach and director Robert F. McGowan began to look for an overweight child actor to replace Joe Cobb in the popular film series. Cobb was twelve years old, and the series was about to transition to sound. Roach and McGowan held a nationwide contest to find a replacement for Cobb. Chaney won this contest in early 1929 and was offered a two-year contract. "He adapted gracefully, and we all liked him, he was a nice fellow," said McGowan of Chaney. His stay with the series was brief, but he made a memorable impression on generations of fans. He was taught the expression of the "slow burn" by the comedian Edgar Kennedy.

At the time, Chaney was only 3' 11" and weighed about 113 pounds (119 cm and 51 kg respectively). He was nicknamed "Chubby" for the series and made his debut in the second sound entry, Railroadin', appearing in 19 Our Gang films over a period of two years, including shorts such as Boxing Gloves and Teacher's Pet. Norman Chaney and Joe Cobb appeared in three shorts together. Chaney's most memorable moments were in Love Business, in which he competed with Jackie Cooper for the affections of their teacher, Miss Crabtree (bringing her flowers and candy, he coyly proposes, "Don't call me Norman; Call me 'Chubsy-Ubsy'").

By spring 1931, Chaney was getting taller and increasingly heavier. He finished out the 1930–31 season without being offered another contract. Both Chaney and his parents decided he would not pursue acting following his final Our Gang short, Fly My Kite. Chaney's departure occurred during a period of great cast turnover, as Allen Hoskins (a member of the original 1922 cast), Jackie Cooper and Mary Ann Jackson had outgrown the series as well.

== Later years and death ==
After leaving the series, Chaney returned to his native Baltimore and attended public school, where he excelled in his studies. In spite of having a normal diet and regular exercise since childhood, he continued to gain weight and eventually topped 300 lb (140 kg), though he never grew beyond 4 ft 7 in (1.4 m). His weight continued to increase, and it was discovered that he had a glandular ailment. In 1935, Chaney underwent treatment for the ailment at Johns Hopkins Hospital; his weight then dropped from over 300 lb (140 kg) to less than 140 lb (64 kg).

Chaney became seriously ill from the stress on his body that the rapid weight loss caused. He died from myocarditis on May 29, 1936, at age 21, according to his death certificate. At the time of his death, Chaney weighed 110 lb (50 kg). He was the first of the regular Our Gang alumni to die.

Chaney was buried in Baltimore Cemetery in his hometown of Baltimore, Maryland. His grave remained unmarked for 76 years because his mother was not able to afford a marker for him or herself. Even though he was paid a weekly salary for his movie appearances, he never received any royalties or residuals for the films' subsequent uses. An online fundraising drive led by Detroit rock musician MIKAL raised $4,500 for headstones to be placed at the graves of both Chaney and his mother. The etched black granite markers, both of which are 16 inches (40.64 cm) tall and 28 inches (71.12 cm) wide, were unveiled on November 10, 2012.

== Filmography ==
- Railroadin' (1929)
- Lazy Days (1929)
- Boxing Gloves (1929)
- Bouncing Babies (1929)
- Moan and Groan, Inc. (1929)
- Shivering Shakespeare (1930)
- The First Seven Years (1930)
- When the Wind Blows (1930)
- Bear Shooters (1930)
- A Tough Winter (1930)
- Pups Is Pups (1930)
- Teacher's Pet (1930)
- School's Out (1930)
- Helping Grandma (1931)
- Love Business (1931)
- Little Daddy (1931)
- The Stolen Jools (1931)
- Bargain Day (1931)
- Fly My Kite (1931)

== Bibliography ==
- John Holmstrom, The Moving Picture Boy: An International Encyclopaedia from 1895 to 1995, Norwich, Michael Russell, 1996, p. 85.
