= Bear Shooters =

1930 short film by Robert F. McGowan

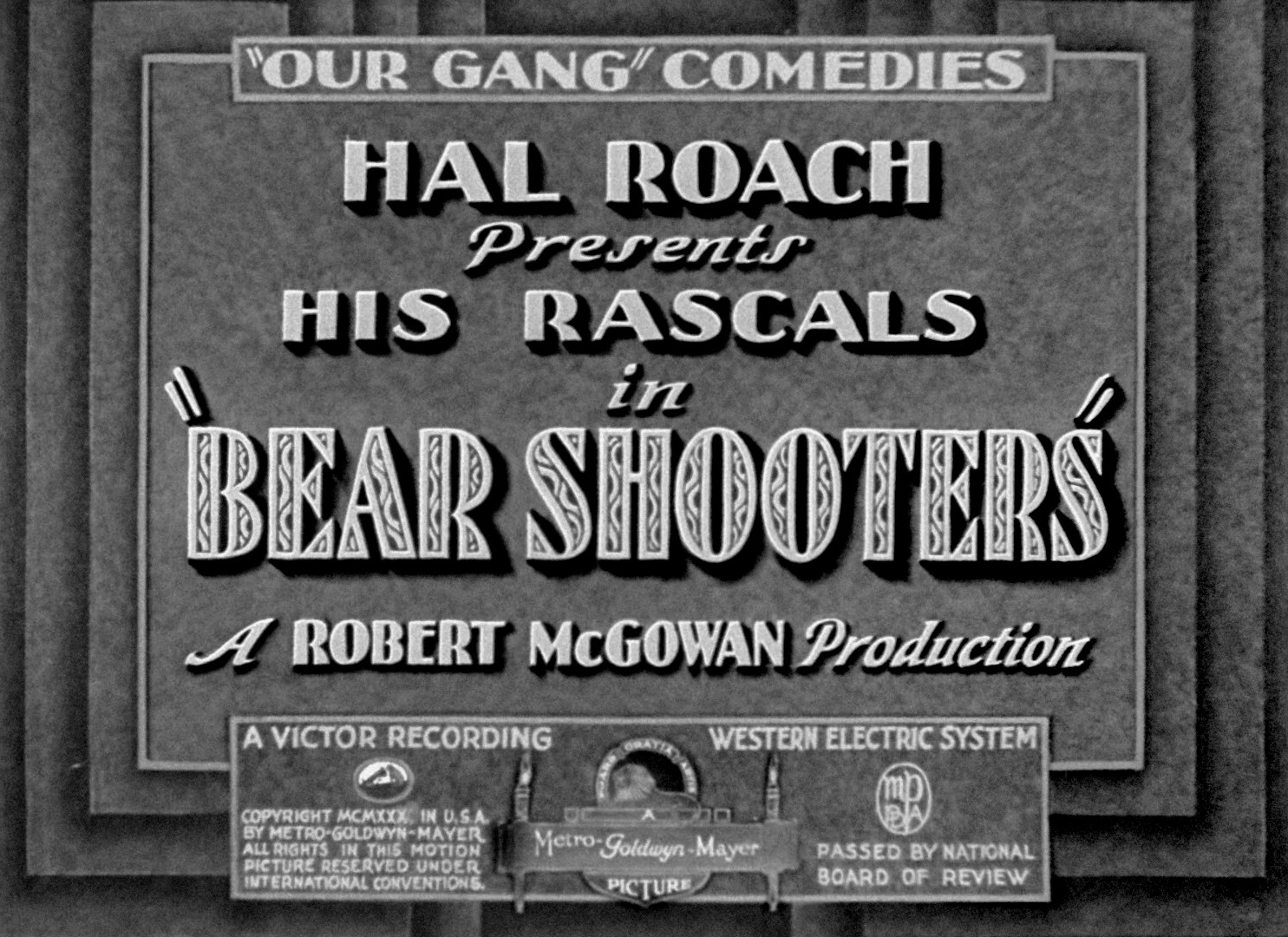
- Directed by: Robert F. McGowan
- Produced by: Robert F. McGowan; Hal Roach
- Starring: Bobby Hutchins; Allen Hoskins; Jackie Cooper; Mary Ann Jackson; Norman Chaney; Leon Janney; Pete the Pup
- Cinematography: Len Powers
- Edited by: Richard C. Currier
- Music by: Ray Henderson
- Distributed by: MGM
- Release date: May 17, 1930
- Running time: 20' 16"
- Country: United States
- Language: English

Bear Shooters is a 1930 Our Gang short comedy film, the 98th in the series, directed by Robert F. McGowan.

== Plot ==
Bear Shooters

Spud wants to take a camping trip and shoot bears with Jackie, Chubby and Farina, but his mother has forced him to mind his little brother Wheezer, who has croup. Spud must periodically apply ointment to Wheezer's chest. He tries to persuade his sister Mary Ann to tend to Wheezer, but she insists on going camping. Spud resolves to go camping anyway and takes both Wheezer and Mary Ann along. The gang travels in an old dilapidated wagon guided by Dinah the Mule. Two bootleggers spot the gang and try to force them to leave. One of the bootleggers dons a gorilla suit to scare the gang, but they trap him. The gang leaves the forest when a skunk sprays the area.

== Production ==
Bear Shooters is a remake of the 1924 silent film It's a Bear, and Allen Hoskins appeared in both films. It is one of four sound Our Gang shorts that fell into the public domain after the copyright lapsed in the 1960s (the other three are School's Out, Our Gang Follies of 1938 and Waldo's Last Stand). As such, these films frequently appear in inexpensive DVD compilations.

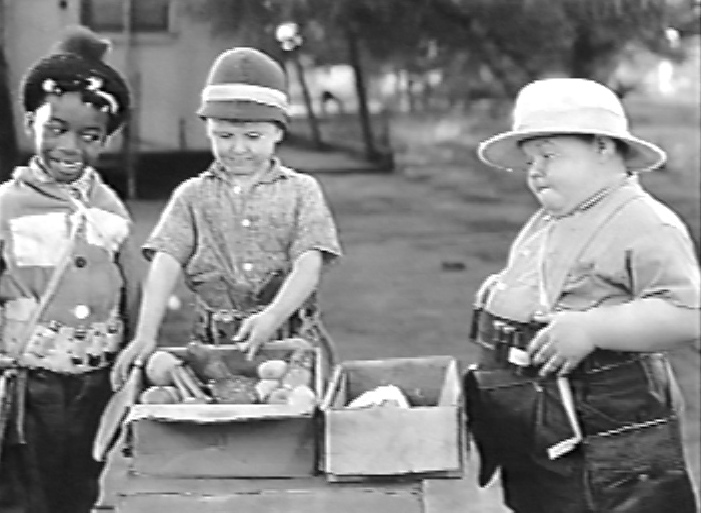
Farina, Jackie and Chubby prepare their lunch for the bear hunt in Bear Shooters.

== Cast ==
=== The Gang ===
- Norman Chaney as Chubby
- Jackie Cooper as Jackie
- Allen Hoskins as Farina
- Bobby Hutchins as Wheezer
- Mary Ann Jackson as Mary Ann
- Leon Janney as Donald 'Spud'
- Pete the Pup as himself
- Dinah the Mule as herself

=== Additional cast ===
- Fay Holderness as Spud's mother
- Charlie Hall as Charlie (Bootlegger #2)
- Bob Kortman as Bob (Bootlegger #1)
- Charles Gemora as Charlie (in gorilla suit)

== See also ==
- Our Gang filmography
