= School's Out (1930 film) =

1930 short film by Robert F. McGowan

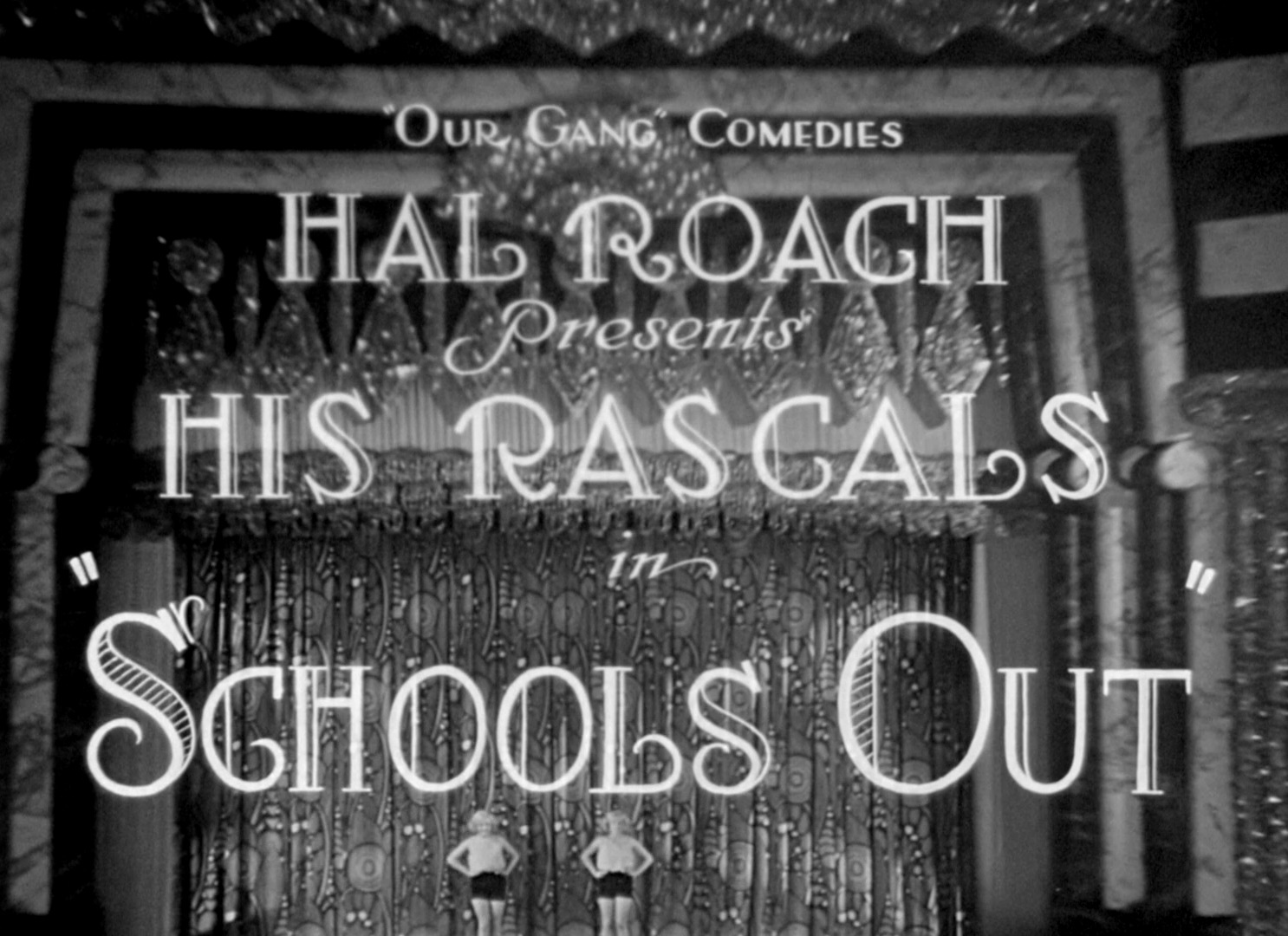
- Title card
- Directed by: Robert F. McGowan
- Written by: H. M. Walker
- Produced by: Hal Roach
- Starring: June Marlowe; Jackie Cooper; Allen Hoskins; Norman Chaney; Mary Ann Jackson; Bobby Hutchins; Dorothy DeBorba; Bobby Young; Creighton Hale
- Cinematography: Art Lloyd
- Edited by: Richard C. Currier
- Music by: Leroy Shield; Marvin Hatley
- Production company: Hal Roach Studios
- Distributed by: Metro-Goldwyn-Mayer
- Release date: November 22, 1930
- Running time: 20' 38"
- Country: United States
- Language: English

School's Out is a 1930 Our Gang short comedy film directed by Robert F. McGowan. Produced by Hal Roach and released to theaters by Metro-Goldwyn-Mayer, it was the 102nd Our Gang short to be released.

== Plot ==
Jackie is trying to circulate a petition among his classmates to keep school open during the summer, as he and the gang are afraid that they might lose Miss Crabtree during summer vacation. In addition, the kids fear she might get married and therefore no longer be able to teach them.

The gang has grown to like Miss Crabtree tremendously, and ride with her in her roadster to school every morning. In the car this particular morning, the kids all try to scare Miss Crabtree away from even considering marriage in the future, but Miss Crabtree states that she wants to get married some day.

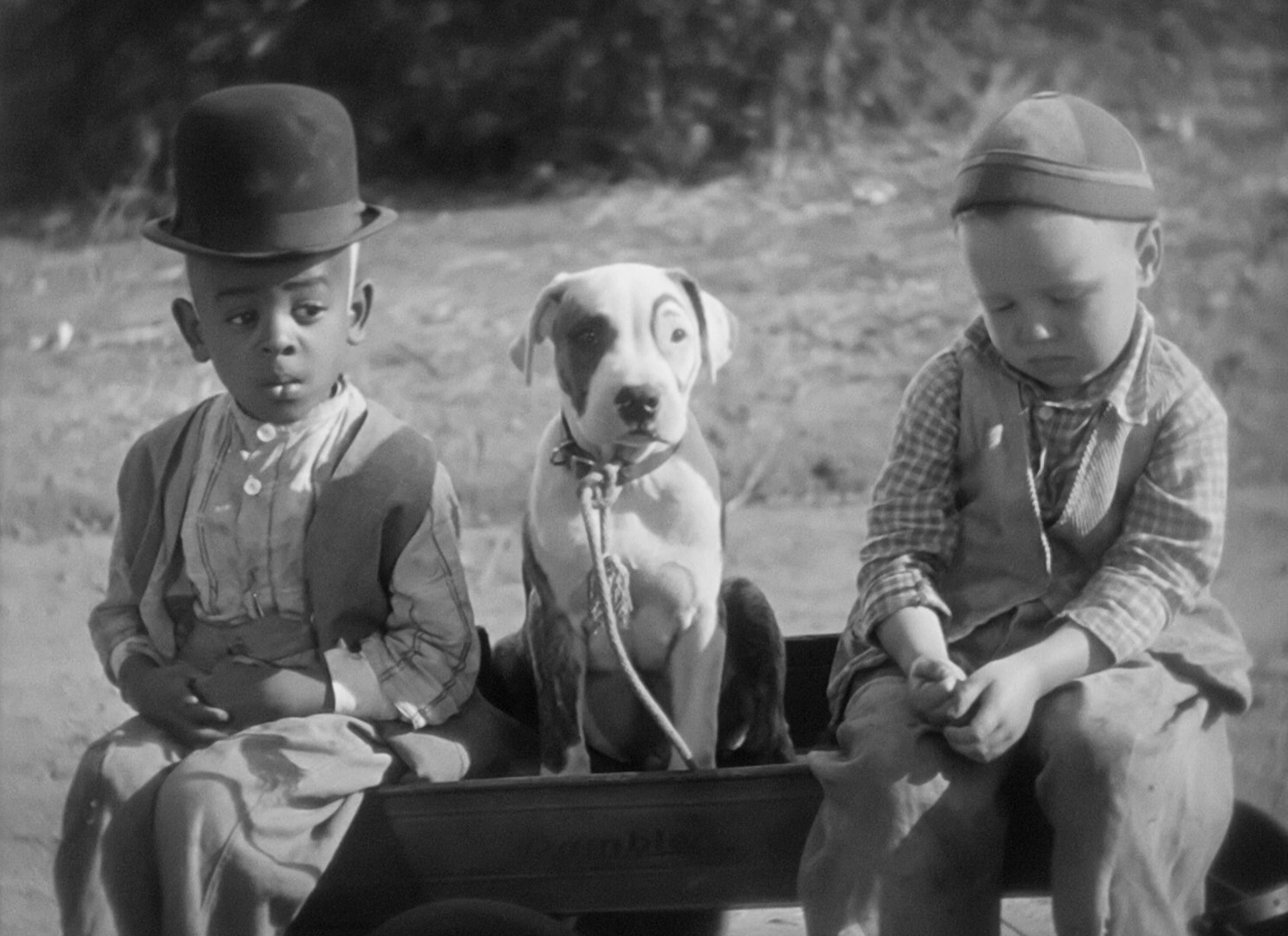
Matthew Beard (Stymie), Pete the Pup, and Bobby Hutchins (Wheezer) in School's Out.

Later in the day, Miss Crabtree goes into town for lunch, and a man named "Jack" stops by the school looking for her. The man is actually Miss Crabtree's brother, but the gang is afraid that Jack is a suitor who wants to marry their teacher. The kids tell the man outlandish lies about Miss Crabtree to scare him away ("She has two sets of false teeth and one wooden leg!"; "She's got seven husbands!"; "And twenty-one kids!"). Jackie, Farina and Chubby follow Jack when he leaves the schoolyard and goes for a swim in the nearby lake. Hoping to keep Jack away from Miss Crabtree, the boys steal and stash his clothes, forcing Jack to wander around dressed in leaves and branches.

Class resumes that afternoon. The class is asked questions in history. After about 10 foolish answers, Miss Crabtree threatens to punish the next student that gives her another one. She then asks Farina to recite the Gettysburg Address. He answers incorrectly. Demanding the source, Farina and the Gang point to Bonedust who reveals a minstrel joke book.

Meanwhile, Miss Crabtree's brother begins walking nearly naked, with only branches to cover himself, back to the school. She then asks the class if a man was up at school looking for her and that he is her brother. Chubby and Farina then begin crying and confess what they told her brother. She starts crying as well until he sees her brother arrive dressed in a dress and hat. She and the rest of the kids burst into laughter. Stymie, Wheezer and Dorothy then walk in dressed in her brother's clothes, along with carrying handfuls of his money.

School's Out (1930)

== Cast ==
=== The Gang ===
- Jackie Cooper as Jackie Cooper
- Norman Chaney as Chubby Chaney
- Matthew Beard as Hercules
- Dorothy DeBorba as Echo
- Allen Hoskins as Farina
- Bobby Hutchins as Wheezer
- Mary Ann Jackson as Mary Ann Jackson
- Donald Haines as Donald Haines
- Buddy McDonald as Buddy O'Donnell
- Bobby Young as Robert 'Bonedust'
- Pete the Pup as himself

=== Additional cast ===
- Douglas Greer as Douglas Greer
- Bobby Mallon as Bobby Mallon
- June Marlowe as Miss Crabtree
- Creighton Hale as Jack Crabtree
- Lyle Tayo as Woman on path
- Mildred Kornman as Classroom extra
- Barbara Roach as Classroom extra
- Beverly and Betty Mae Crane as the title readers
- William Courtwright as the old man (scene deleted)

== Production notes ==
A sequel to Teacher's Pet, School's Out was the second of six Our Gang shorts to feature June Marlowe as Miss Crabtree. This was also Bobby Young's first talkie short in Our Gang. When shown on television as part of King World's The Little Rascals package beginning in the 1970s, School's Out was edited to remove racial humor and stereotypes relating to African-Americans.

The kids lost their last teacher, Miss Magillicuddy, when she got married. In the 1930s, female teachers were usually not allowed to continue their profession after marriage.

School's Out is one of four sound Our Gang shorts that fell into the public domain after the copyright lapsed in the 1960s (the other three being Bear Shooters, Our Gang Follies of 1938 and Waldo's Last Stand). As such, these films frequently appear on inexpensive video and/or DVD compilations.

Miss Crabtree gives the gang a ride to school in School's Out .

== See also ==
- Our Gang filmography
