= Teacher's Pet (1930 film) =

1930 film

- Directed by: Robert F. McGowan
- Written by: Robert F. McGowan; H. M. Walker
- Produced by: Robert F. McGowan; Hal Roach
- Starring: June Marlowe; Jackie Cooper; Allen Hoskins; Norman Chaney; Mary Ann Jackson; Bobby Hutchins; Dorothy DeBorba; Matthew Beard; Buddy McDonald
- Cinematography: Art Lloyd
- Edited by: Richard C. Currier
- Music by: Leroy Shield; Marvin Hatley
- Distributed by: Metro-Goldwyn-Mayer
- Release date: October 11, 1930
- Running time: 20 minutes
- Country: United States
- Language: English

Teacher's Pet is a 1930 two-reel comedy short, part of the Our Gang (Little Rascals) series. It was produced by Hal Roach, directed by Robert F. McGowan, and originally released to theatres by Metro-Goldwyn-Mayer on October 11, 1930. It was the 101st Our Gang short to be released.

== Plot ==
Teacher's Pet (1930)

It is the first day of school, and the gang is less than happy about it. Their beloved teacher, Miss McGillicuddy, got married, and now the kids will have a new teacher for the upcoming school year. The kids do not know what the new teacher will look like, only her name, a rather pungent moniker of "Miss Crabtree". They imagine this "Miss Crabtree" to be a dried-up old hag, and concoct a plan to disrupt the class with items such as a white mouse, red ants, and sneezing powder. Then, the kids are to have their younger siblings — Wheezer, Dorothy, and Hercules — come in and tell Miss Crabtree that they need to be excused to go home ... "and then, we're all goin' swimmin'!"

Jack, the mastermind of the operation, asks Wheezer if he remembers what to say. Wheezer says "Mama wants Jack home right away; she's gonna shoot Papa!" Jackie says "No, that's too strong; just say 'important business'."

However, the plan falls apart when Jackie takes a ride to school from a beautiful young lady (June Marlowe) with a shiny roadster. Unbeknownst to Jackie, his benefactor is actually Miss Crabtree, and he tells her everything about the plan to harass the new teacher. She drops Jack off a mile from the school, and Jack tells her, "Y'know, you're almost as pretty as Miss McGillicuddy ... all except in your nose."

After telling the gang about the beautiful lady that gave him the ride, Jack is shocked to find that the lady with the roadster and Miss Crabtree are one and the same. She spends the class period identifying Jack's co-conspirators (Farina, Chubby, and Buddy), and suspends the foursome for the day just as some delivery boys (Baldwin Cooke and Gordon Douglas) bring in a wealth of cake and ice cream as a first-day treat for the class. After being shooed outside, the kids all turn on Jack, with an angry Farina remarking "Yeah, my pal", making a throat-cutting gesture to accent his anger. Farina, Chubby, and Buddy decide to go back inside, apologize, and hope that they can "get in on that ice cream". Jack decides that he "can't ever go back; I'm too ashamed", sits under a tree in the schoolyard and begins sobbing. After accepting the other three pranksters' apologies and giving them their treats, Miss Crabtree goes outside looking for Jack, and upon finding him quietly presents him with a plate of cake and a bowl of ice cream, showing that she forgives him. Amidst tears, Jack looks up at Miss Crabtree and tells her "Gee, you're pretty, Miss Crabtree – you're even prettier than Miss McGillicuddy", and solemnly tries to eat his dessert.

== Cast ==
=== The Gang ===
- Jackie Cooper as Jackie
- Matthew Beard as Hercules
- Norman Chaney as Chubby
- Dorothy DeBorba as Dorothy
- Allen Hoskins as Farina
- Bobby Hutchins as Wheezer
- Mary Ann Jackson as Mary Ann
- Buddy McDonald as Buddy

=== Additional cast ===
- Artye Folz as Third pea-shooter victim
- Donald Haines as Don
- June Marlowe as Miss June Crabtree
- Baldwin Cooke as First caterer
- William Courtright as Old man talking with Miss Crabtree (in his last film role)
- Gordon Douglas as Second caterer
- Beverly and Betty Mae Crane as the Title readers
- Mildred Kornman as Classroom extra
- Bobby Mallon as Classroom extra
- Billy Seay as Classroom extra
- Barbara Roach as Classroom extra

== Notability ==
Teacher's Pet marks the first Our Gang appearance of June Marlowe as the "lovely schoolteacher" Miss Crabtree, and of Matthew Beard, here identified as "Hercules", and later called "Stymie".

The short was also the first in the series to use the now-popular Our Gang theme song, "Good Old Days", composed by Leroy Shield and featuring a notable saxophone solo. Teacher's Pet was also the first of three Our Gang films in what is now considered the "Jackie/Miss Crabtree trilogy", which were the first sound Our Gang films to successfully balance comedy with drama and emotion. All three of the films (the other two are School's Out and Love Business) are opened not with text title cards, but with live-action title cards recited to the audience by twin girls, Betty Mae and Beverly Crane:

(in unison) "Dear Ladies and Gentlemen; Hal Roach presents, for your entertainment and approval, His Rascals, in their latest Our Gang comedy entitled Teacher's Pet.
(first twin) Direction by Robert McGowan....
(second twin) ...photography by Art Lloyd...
(first twin) ...edited by Richard Currier...
(second twin) ...recording by Elmer Raguse...
(in unison)...and dialogue by H.M. Walker. We thank you!

== Release and legacy ==
Teacher's Pet is considered a quintessential entry in the Our Gang series. Jackie Cooper's performance in this film paved the way for his roles in major Paramount feature films such as Skippy and The Champ. By the spring of 1931, Hal Roach had sold his contract to MGM so that Cooper could make features full-time. Miss Crabtree would go on to appear in five more Our Gang shorts, and she remains today not only the most popular adult character from Our Gang, but also one of the most popular fictional schoolteachers of all time.

Teacher's Pet was remade by Hal Roach in 1936 as Bored of Education. Directed by Gordon Douglas (who coincidentally has a walk-on as a delivery boy in Teacher's Pet), and starring the mid/late 1930s Our Gang line-up of Spanky, Alfalfa, Buckwheat, Darla, and Porky, Bored of Education won the 1937 Academy Award for Short Subjects (One-Reel).

The television syndication print distributed by King World was edited in 1971 to remove scenes considered in bad taste, but these scenes were reinstated in the early 1990s.

== See also ==
- Our Gang filmography
