= Railroadin' =

1929 Our Gang short film

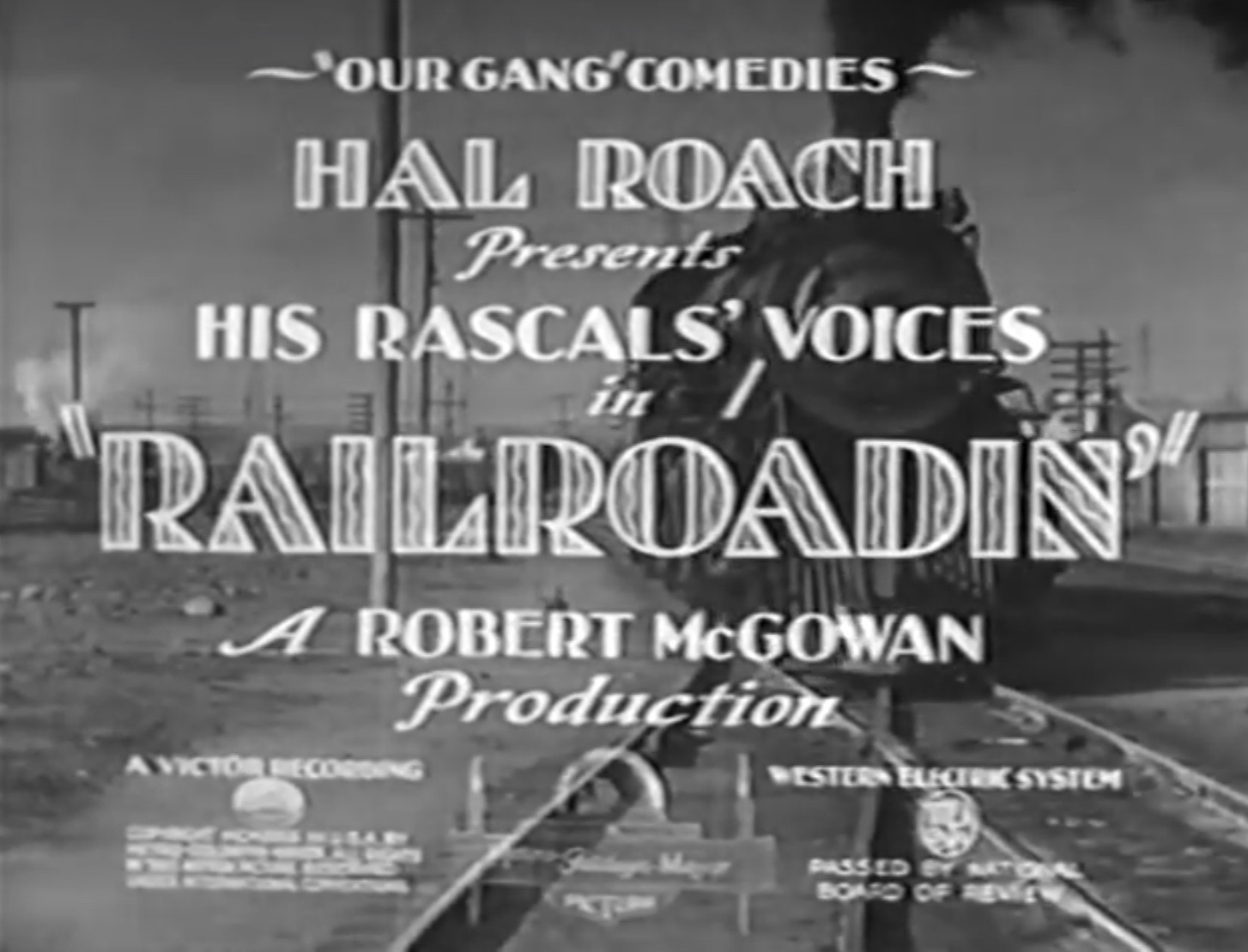
- Directed by: Robert F. McGowan
- Written by: Robert F. McGowan; H.M. Walker
- Produced by: Robert F. McGowan; Hal Roach
- Starring: Joe Cobb; Allen Hoskins; Norman Chaney; Harry Spear; Mary Ann Jackson; Bobby Hutchins; Otto Fries
- Cinematography: F. E. Hershey; Art Lloyd
- Edited by: Richard C. Currier
- Music by: Ray Henderson
- Distributed by: MGM
- Release date: June 15, 1929
- Running time: 18' 40"
- Country: United States
- Language: English

Railroadin' is an Our Gang short comedy film, the 88th in the series, directed by Robert F. McGowan. It is the second film in the series to be produced with sound.

== Plot ==
Railroadin' (1929)

The gang is playing around the railroad station, and Joe and Chubby's engineer father lectures them for playing in such a dangerous area. After the father leaves, a crazy man named Loco Joe starts a train with most of the kids aboard, except Farina, who is nearly flattened several times. When Farina manages to climb aboard, the kids unsuccessfully attempt to stop the runaway train, which crashes into a grocery truck. The entire incident is revealed to be Farina's dream.

== Production notes ==
Railroadin' is a partial remake of The Sun Down Limited. The film marks the first appearance of Norman Chaney as "Chubby", having won a national contest to replace Joe Cobb as the Our Gang "fat kid".

== Lost soundtrack ==
Like many early sound films, Railroadin' was recorded using a sound-on-disc synchronization process. The soundtracks for the film were held on separate phonographic records that would be played by a projectionist synchronously with the film. The film's sound discs went missing at MGM in the 1940s, and only the film negative survived. When MGM sold Hal Roach the catalog of Our Gang films produced at his studio, Roach acquired only the picture element of Railroadin'. Because of its lack of sound, the short was never included in any of the Little Rascals theatrical reissues or television-distribution packages.

Home-movie distributor Blackhawk Films produced a silent adaption of Railroadin' with text titles in the 1970s, leading to the film's first release in any form since its original theatrical release. In 1982, the long-lost sound discs for Railroadin' were located in an MGM vault, and the film was finally made available with sound for the first time in decades with a 1983 VHS release issued by Blackhawk. Railroadin' has since been released on DVD as well, but was not added into the Little Rascals television package despite the restoration of sound.

== Cast ==
=== The Gang ===
- Norman Chaney as Chubby
- Joe Cobb as Joe
- Jean Darling as Jean
- Allen Hoskins as Farina
- Bobby Hutchins as Wheezer
- Mary Ann Jackson as Mary Ann
- Harry Spear as Harry
- Pete the Pup as Himself

=== Additional cast ===
- Ed Brandenburg as brakeman
- Carolyn Chaney as Passenger
- Dorothy Hamilton Darling as Passenger
- Otto Fries as Otto, Joe's father
- Jack Hill as Grocery truck driver
- Harry Lorraine (American actor) as Loco Joe

== See also ==
- Our Gang filmography
