= Our Gang Follies of 1938 =

1937 American short film by Gordon Douglas

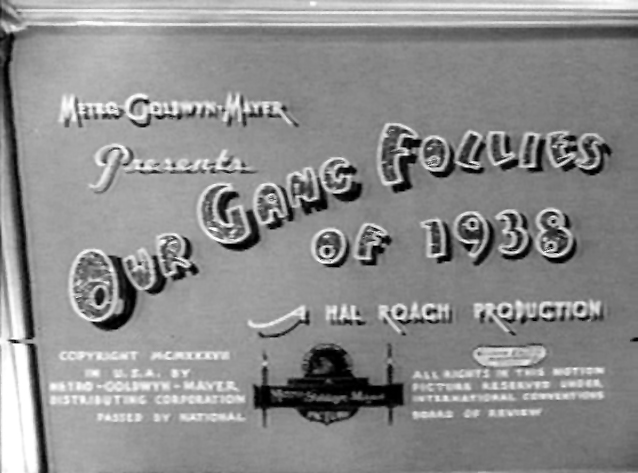
- Directed by: Gordon Douglas
- Written by: Hal Law; Robert A. McGowan; Norman Blackburn; Charles Rogers
- Produced by: Hal Roach
- Starring: Carl Switzer; George McFarland; Eugene Lee; Darla Hood; Billie Thomas; Henry Brandon
- Cinematography: Art Lloyd
- Edited by: William H. Ziegler
- Music by: Marvin Hatley; Gioacchino Rossini; Arthur Johnston; Sam Coslow
- Production company: Hal Roach Studios
- Distributed by: Metro-Goldwyn-Mayer
- Release date: December 18, 1937
- Running time: 21' 16"
- Country: United States
- Language: English
- Budget: $58,815

Our Gang Follies of 1938 (later reissued as simply Follies of 1938) is a 1937 American musical short subject, the 161st short subject entry in Hal Roach's Our Gang (Little Rascals) series. Directed by Gordon Douglas as a sequel to 1935's Our Gang Follies of 1936, the two-reel short was released to theaters on December 18, 1937, by Metro-Goldwyn-Mayer.

Deriving its title from the concurrent MGM feature film The Broadway Melody of 1938, Our Gang Follies of 1938 is a spoof of the Broadway Melody films and other movie musicals of the time. In the film, Alfalfa (Carl Switzer) decides to quit a pop music revue put on by Spanky (George McFarland) and become an opera singer, famously singing a pastiche song entitled "The Barber of Seville" several times throughout the film. The bulk of the film is made up of a dream sequence, in which Alfalfa imagines himself twenty years later failing as an opera singer, while Spanky owns a Broadway nightclub with a lavish floor show.

== Plot ==
The gang is putting on another big show in Spanky's cellar, complete with an orchestra led by Buckwheat (Billie Thomas), and performances by Darla (Darla Hood) and many of the other neighborhood kids. However, "King of Crooners" Alfalfa (Carl Switzer), the star of the show, crashes the swing music based show with his off-key rendition of "The Barber of Seville", having secretly decided he is going to sing opera from now on. Spanky closes the curtain on Alfalfa and sends out another act to replace him, causing Alfalfa to walk out and take his voice "where it'll be appreciated!"

With Porky (Eugene Lee) accompanying him, Alfalfa turns up at the Cosmopolitan Opera House, wanting to appear in their next opera. Barnaby (Henry Brandon), the Cosmopolitan's impresario, jokingly offers the young boy a contract — provided he come back in twenty years. Elated, Alfalfa returns to Spanky's cellar with Porky, gloating about his presumed good fortune. Spanky tears into him, telling him that "someday I'll be a big producer on Broadway, and you'll be singing your opera in the streets with a tin cup in your hand!"

Alfalfa brushes off Spanky's warnings and falls asleep backstage, dreaming that the twenty years have elapsed and the public is awaiting his debut at Barnaby's opera house. However, Alfalfa is quickly booed by the audience and pelted with rotten vegetables. An angry Barnaby, now a wizened old man, throws Alfalfa out into the New York streets and forces him to sing for pennies in the snow. Hungry and broke, Alfalfa and Porky happen upon Club Spanky, an ornate nightclub on Broadway, owned by a now-rich Spanky and headlined by the also rich Darla and "Cab Buckwheat".

Inviting them in to see the show, Spanky offers to let Alfalfa and Porky work for him again. Porky immediately accepts, but Alfalfa stubbornly refuses. However, after seeing the floor show starring Darla, Buckwheat, Porky, and a few other performers, Alfalfa is won over and changes his mind. Just as he begins to sing, however, Barnaby appears to drag him back out by the arm to sing in the snow. Alfalfa struggles to release himself from Barnaby's grip while the children chant "We want Alfalfa! We want Alfalfa!"

Alfalfa then awakens to find himself back in Spanky's cellar with the audience continuing to chant in the background. Spanky begs him to join in the last act, and Alfalfa, needing no further convincing and fed up with opera, tears up his contract and rushes onstage to sing Bing Crosby's "Learn to Croon" for the show's finale.

== Cast ==
=== The Gang ===
- Carl Switzer as Alfalfa
- Darla Hood as Darla
- Eugene Lee as Porky
- George McFarland as Spanky
- Billie Thomas as Buckwheat

=== Additional cast ===
- Annabelle Logan (Annie Ross) as Girl singing "The Bonnie Banks o' Loch Lomond"
- Georgia Jean LaRue as Girl singing
- Philip MacMahon as Boy singing
- Ada Lynn as Blues singer (scenes deleted)
- Gloria Brown as Hula girl/Chorus girl/Bowery girl
- Jana Ekelund as Check room girl
- Betsy Gay as Eccentric girl
- Gloria Hurst as Hula girl/Dancer in nightclub
- Sylvia Johnson as Porky's girlfriend
- Dickie Jones as Dickie
- Henry Lee as Spike
- Gloria Mackey as Eccentric girl
- Patsy May as Check room girl
- Tommy McFarland as Tommy
- Trina Morris as Eccentric girl
- Clifford Severn, Jr. as Richard
- Harold Switzer as Harold
- Laura June Williams as Hula girl
- The Ben Carter Kids as Orchestra members
- The Bud Murray Kids as Dancers

=== Adults ===
- Henry Brandon as "Barnaby", opera impresario
- Gino Corrado as Opera singer
- Wilma Cox as Miss Jones, Barnaby's secretary
- Doodles Weaver as Piano player

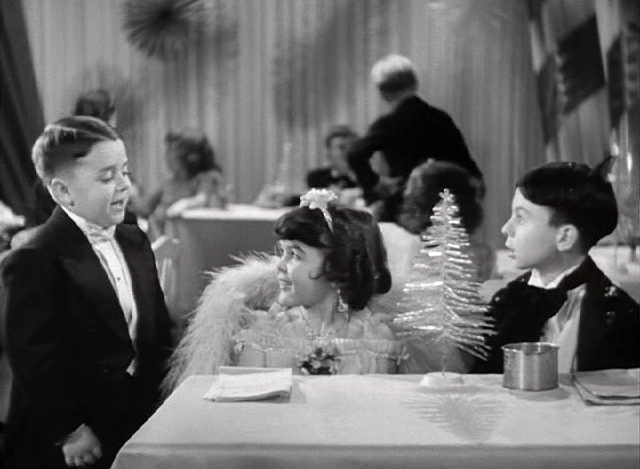
Spanky, Darla, and Alfalfa in the "Club Spanky" dream sequence'

== Production ==
Often pointed out as one of the best entries in the series, Follies of 1938 was produced as a special one-shot return to the series' original two-reel (twenty-minute) format, after a season and a half of shorter one-reel films. In addition, Follies of 1938, particularly its extended dream sequence, features lavish production design and filmmaking typical of feature length MGM musicals. MGM in fact helped finance the short beyond its usual contributions to the Roach shorts; as a result its opening titles read "Metro-Goldwyn-Mayer presents Our Gang Follies of 1938, A Hal Roach Production," as opposed to the usual "Hal Roach Presents Our Gang in..." At a cost of $58,000, Follies of 1938 was the most expensive Our Gang short ever produced.

The short's cast includes over one hundred children, as nearly all of the parts in the film (even the "adults" in Alfalfa's dream sequence) are played by kids. The lone exceptions are Henry Brandon's "Barnaby" character (not named onscreen, but named as such in the script), and the other three adults seen at the Cosmopolitan Opera House. Brandon's villainous Barnaby character was re-purposed from another Hal Roach production, Laurel and Hardy's 1934 feature Babes in Toyland. One of the featured singers in Spanky's cellar show is Annabelle Logan, a girl who sings a swing rendition of the traditional Scottish song "The Bonnie Banks o' Loch Lomond". Logan would grow up to become Annie Ross, a successful jazz singer and actress.

== Rights ==
Our Gang Follies of 1938 is one of four sound Our Gang shorts that fell into the public domain after the copyright lapsed in the 1960s (the other three being School's Out, Bear Shooters, and Waldo's Last Stand). As such, these films frequently appear on inexpensive video and/or DVD compilations.

== Songs ==
Songwriters are listed in italics.

1. "Stagecoach Conversation" (Marvin Hatley) - Buckwheat and His Orchestra (instrumental)
2. "Follies Introduction/King Alfalfa" (Hatley) - Spanky, Darla, and "Follies" chorus girls
3. "The Barber of Seville" (Gioacchino Rossini) - Alfalfa
4. "Pick a Star" (R. Alex. Anderson) - Harmonica Players (Henry Lee and Harold Switzer)
5. "The Barber of Seville" (Reprise #1) - Gino Corrado and Alfalfa
6. "Loch Lomond" - Annabelle Logan
7. "Honolulu Baby" (Hatley) - Buckwheat and his Band (instrumental)
8. "The Barber of Seville" (Reprise #2) - Alfalfa
9. "Follow the Leader" (Arthur Morton) - "Cab Buckwheat" and His Orchestra
10. "The Love Bug Will Get You (If You Don't Watch Out)" (Pinky Tomlin) - Darla, Spanky, Porky, Buckwheat and Georgia Jean LaRue
11. "That Foolish Feeling" (Harold Adamson, Jimmy McHugh) - Georgia Jean LaRue
12. "There's No Two Ways About It)" (Harold Adamson, Jimmy McHugh) - Philip MacMahon and Ensemble
13. "Learn to Croon" (Arthur Johnston, Sam Coslow) - Alfalfa
14. "Follies Conclusion" (Hatley) - Alfalfa, Spanky, Darla, Porky, Harold Switzer, Henry Lee, Gloria Browne, Gloria Hurst, and Laura June Williams

== See also ==
- Our Gang filmography
