= It's a Bear =

1924 short film by Robert F. McGowan

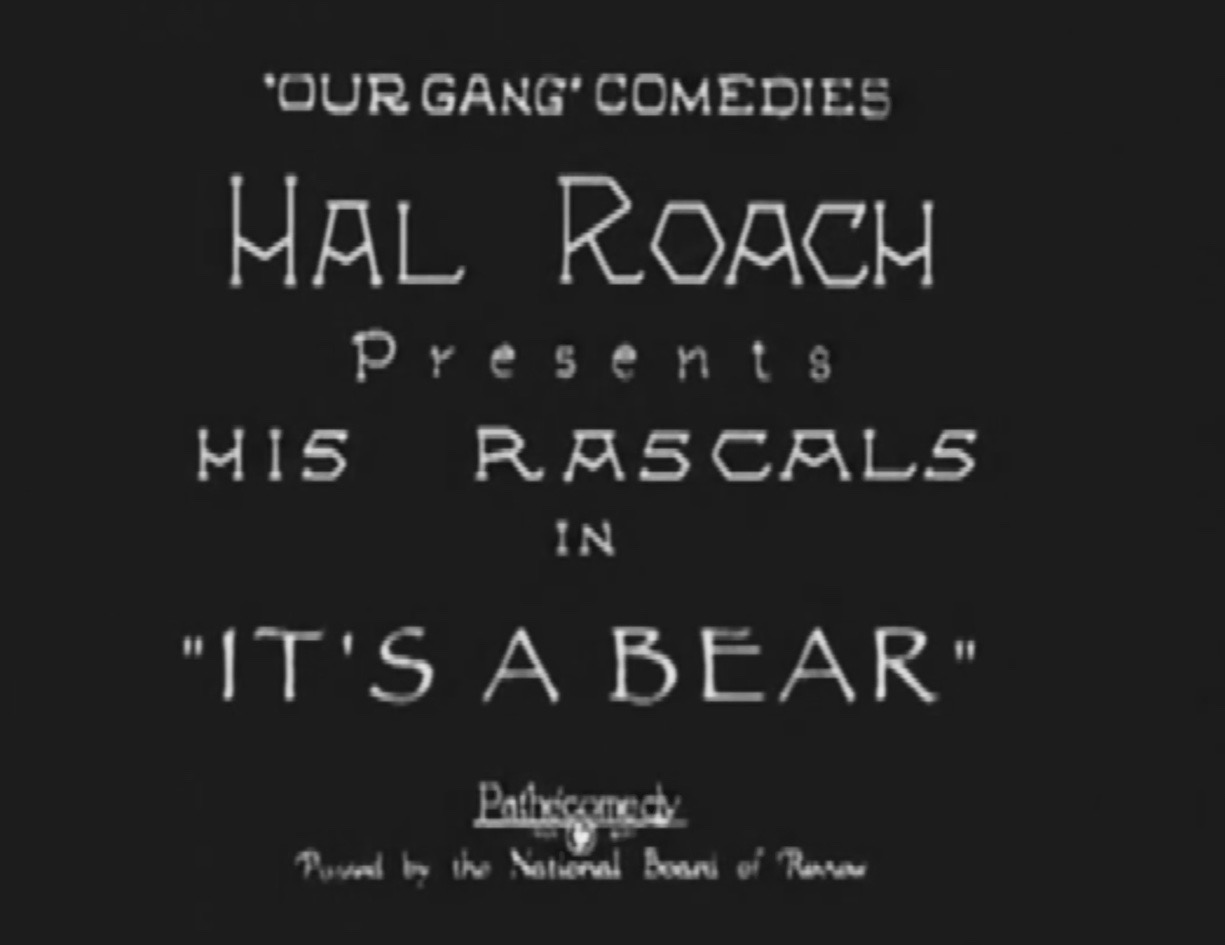
- Intertitle
- Directed by: Robert F. McGowan
- Written by: Hal Roach; H. M. Walker
- Produced by: Hal Roach
- Starring: Joe Cobb; Jackie Condon; Mickey Daniels; Allen Hoskins; Mary Kornman; Ernest Morrison; Dick Henchen; Dinah the Mule; Pal the Dog; Helen Gilmore; Noah Young
- Distributed by: Pathé Exchange
- Release date: July 27, 1924
- Running time: 20 minutes
- Country: United States
- Language: Silent with English intertitles

It's a Bear is a 1924 American short silent comedy film directed by Robert F. McGowan. It was the 28th Our Gang short subject to be released. It's a Bear was remade with sound in 1930, as Bear Shooters. Allen Hoskins appeared in both films.

== Plot ==
The gang decides to go hunting for big game and encounter a real bear.

== Cast ==
=== The Gang ===
- Joe Cobb as Joe
- Jackie Condon as Jackie
- Mickey Daniels as Mickey
- Allen Hoskins as Farina
- Mary Kornman as Mary
- Ernie Morrison as Ernie
- Dick Henchen as Dick
- Dinah the Mule
- Pal the Dog

=== Additional cast ===
- Helen Gilmore as Farmer's wife
- Noah Young as Sheriff
