= Carlton Griffin =

American actor (1893–1940)

- Born: May 23, 1893; New York, New York
- Died: July 23, 1940 (aged 47); Hollywood, California
- Other name: C. Elliott Griffin
- Occupation: Actor
- Years active: ?1910s - 1940

Carlton Griffin (May 23, 1893 – July 23, 1940) was an American film actor. He appeared in over 50 films between the mid-1910s until 1940. In his first films, he was credited as C. Elliott Griffin or C. E. Griffin.

== Biography ==
Griffin was born in New York, New York, and died at his home in Hollywood, California on July 23, 1940, shortly after finishing work on his final film, Columbia's Before I Die. (later retitled Angels Over Broadway).

== Selected filmography ==
- At the Stage Door (1921)
- Shackles of Gold (1922)
- Girl Shy (1924)
- Men (1924)
- Forbidden Paradise (1924)
- The Great Jewel Robbery (1925)
- Lady of the Night (1925)
- Tramp, Tramp, Tramp (1926)
- Her Big Adventure (1926)
- The Impostor (1926)
- The Pip From Pittsburgh (1930)
- Shivering Shakespeare (1930)
- Another Wild Idea (1934)
- The Lady in Question (1940)
- Five Little Peppers in Trouble (1940)
- Angels Over Broadway (1940)
