= Pups Is Pups =

1930 film by Robert F. McGowan

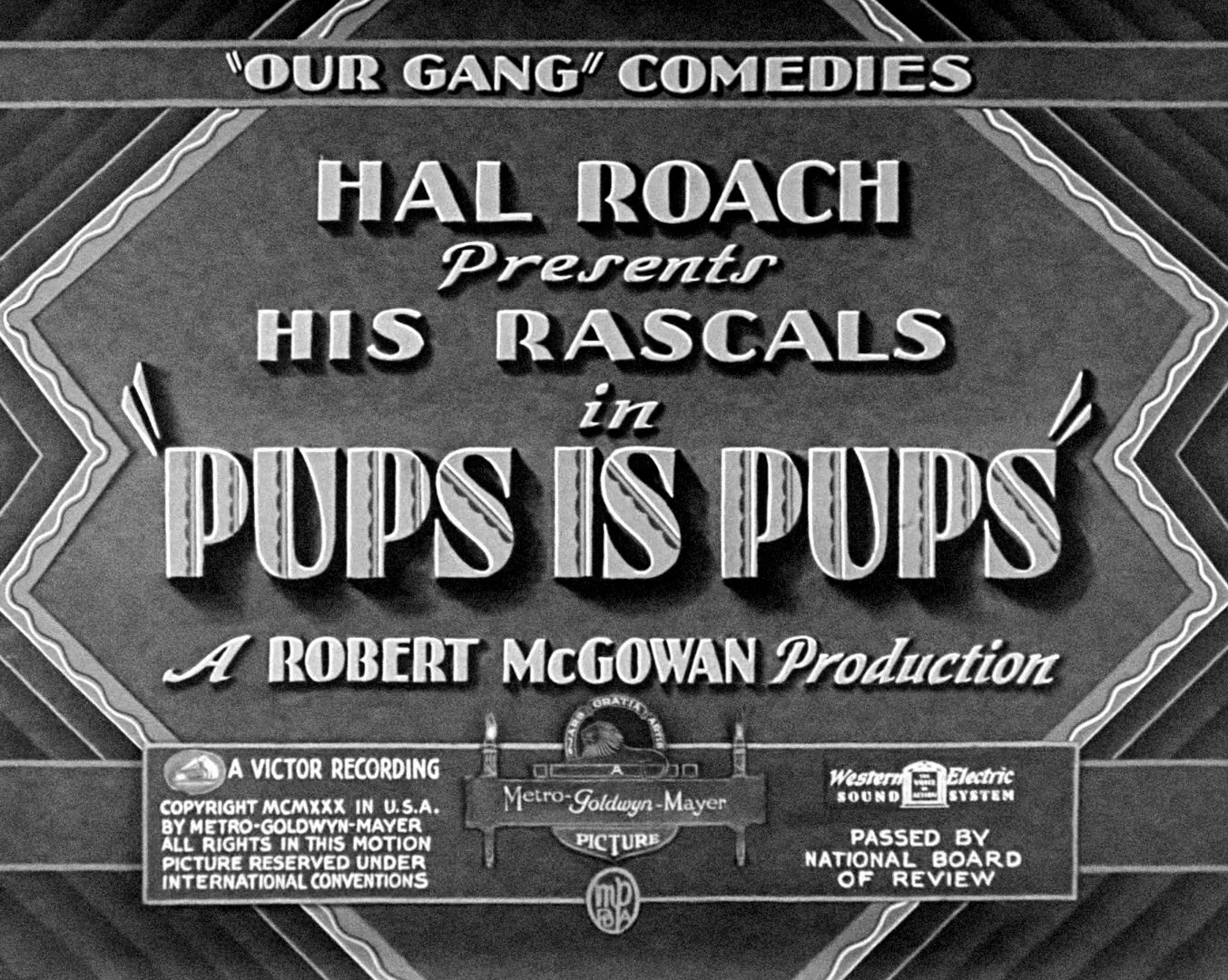
- Directed by: Robert F. McGowan
- Written by: Robert F. McGowan; H. M. Walker
- Produced by: Robert F. McGowan; Hal Roach
- Cinematography: Art Lloyd
- Edited by: Richard C. Currier
- Music by: Leroy Shield; Marvin Hatley
- Distributed by: Metro-Goldwyn-Mayer
- Release date: August 30, 1930
- Running time: 18:24
- Country: United States
- Language: English

Pups Is Pups is a two-reel comedy short subject, part of the Our Gang (The Little Rascals) series. It was produced and directed by Robert F. McGowan for Hal Roach, and originally released to theaters by MGM in 1930. It was the 100th Our Gang short to be released, and the first in the 1930–1931 season.

== Plot ==
Pups Is Pups (1930)

Wheezer attempts to find his puppies after they run off and travel across the city. At the same time, the rest of the gang crash a high-society dog conformation show where Farina is working as a page. The kids bring all manner of wild animal pets (frogs, turtles, mice, ducks, and even a pig) into the show and cause commotion and fear among the ritzy attendees. Because of the commotion the kids cause, Farina is fired.

Meanwhile, Wheezer continues searching for his pups, who run toward a bell — any bell — they hear; he says, "they think they're gonna get dinner." They hear a goat's bell, a fire engine bell, an ice cream truck bell, and a huge church bell, which Wheezer himself rings in a desperate attempt to find the pups. He sits on the curb dejected until the pups, who did hear it, scamper up to him for a happy reunion.

Tying the two sub-plots together is a running gag in which first-time Our Ganger Dorothy DeBorba keeps jumping into a mud puddle, amusing the other children and irritating her mother, who keeps bathing her and changing her clothes. The last time this happens, she thinks it was Farina who pushed the little girl in — and falls in the mud herself.

== Production and exhibition ==
Pups Is Pups was the first entry in the 1930–1931 season of shorts. It was the Our Gang debut for five-year-old Dorothy DeBorba, and for film score composer Leroy Shield. It is the first episode to feature the jazz-based background scoring that the Roach Studio comedies are known for. Some of the tunes included the "Hal Roach Happy Go Lucky Trio" (a.k.a. "Teeter Totter"), "Wishing", "Hide & Go Seek", "On To The Show", and "Confusion". The cues used on Hal Roach comedies are named after the first scenes they are used for. These tunes were used on other Hal Roach produced series at the time.

The industrial landscape framing the Gang's play activities at the beginning of the picture was achieved with a glass-matte process that added towering silo-shaped structures to the more bucolic live views of the Arnaz Ranch, a frequent Roach shooting location. This level of special effect—and budgetary expense—is unusual in Roach two-reelers.

Due to perceived racism toward African-Americans, several scenes featuring Farina were edited out of the Little Rascals syndicated television prints in 1971. They remained in 16mm, VHS and DVD home video releases. The scenes were reinstated in 2001 in the prints shown on American Movie Classics until 2003.

In 2004, Pups Is Pups was selected for preservation in the United States National Film Registry by the Library of Congress as being "culturally, historically, or aesthetically significant."

== Cast ==
=== The Gang ===
- Norman Chaney as Chubby
- Jackie Cooper as Jackie
- Dorothy DeBorba as Dorothy
- Bobby Hutchins as Wheezer
- Allen Hoskins as Farina
- Mary Ann Jackson as Mary Ann
- The Hill Twins as Twins
- Buddy McDonald as Buddy
- Allen Tong as Our Gang member
- Wolfgang Weidler as Our Gang member
- Warner Weidler as Our Gang member
- Pete the Pup as Puppy

=== Additional cast ===
- Harry Bernard as Cop
- Allen Cavan – Dr. H. R. White
- William Gillespie – Musician playing bass tuba
- Charlie Hall – Orchestra leader playing violin
- Lyle Tayo – Dorothy's and Jackie's mother
- Charles McAvoy – Cement worker
- Silas D. Wilcox – Doorman
- Joe the Monkey as Monkey

== See also ==
- Our Gang filmography
