= Donnie "Beezer" Smith =

American actor and comedian

- Born: Donald Ray Smith
- Died: July 8, 2022
- Occupation: Child actor
- Years active: 1928–1929
- Family: Jay R. Smith (brother)

Donald Ray Smith (died July 8, 2022) better known professionally as Donnie "Beezer" Smith, was an American child actor. He appeared in the Our Gang film short series during the silent Pathé era, in between 1928 and 1929.

== Early life ==
Donald Ray Smith was the brother of Jay R. Smith, who later joined the "Our Gang" and was known for his freckled face.

== Our Gang ==
Joining in 1928, Smith appeared in four Our Gang shorts, Fair and Muddy (1928), Little Mother (1929), Boxing Gloves (1929), and Cat, Dog & Co. (1929). He played supporting to small parts, whom he played a character billed either as Donnie or Beezer.

== Personal life ==
Smith died on July 8, 2022, at the age of 97. When fellow former Our Gang actor Mildred Kornman died in 2022. At the time of his death, became one of two known surviving actors from the silent film era, the other being Garry Watson.

== Filmography ==
Year	Title	Role	Notes
1928	Fair and Muddy	Unnamed	Short film
1929	Little Mother	Beezer	Short film
1929	Boxing Gloves	Donnie	Short film
1929	Cat, Dog & Co.	Donnie	Short film
