= Little Mother (1929 film) =

1929 film

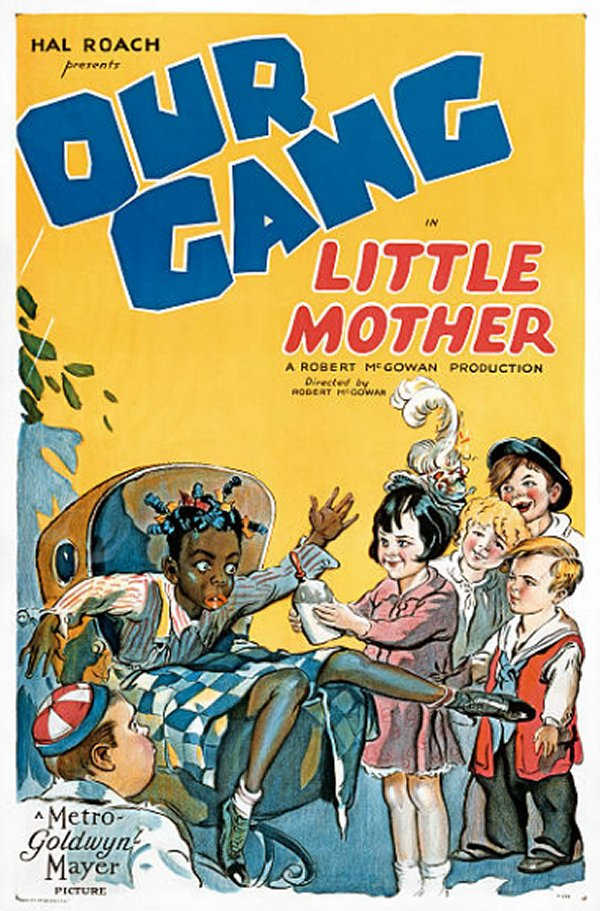
- Film poster
- Directed by: Robert F. McGowan
- Written by: Anthony Mack; H. M. Walker
- Produced by: Robert F. McGowan; Hal Roach
- Starring: Joe Cobb; Jean Darling; Allen Hoskins; Bobby Hutchins; Mary Ann Jackson; Harry Spear; Donnie Smith; Pete the Pup; Charlie Hall; Lyle Tayo
- Cinematography: Art Lloyd
- Edited by: Richard C. Currier
- Distributed by: Metro-Goldwyn-Mayer
- Release date: June 1, 1929
- Running time: 19:45
- Country: United States
- Languages: Silent; English intertitles

Little Mother is a 1929 Our Gang short silent comedy film, the 87th in the series, directed by Robert F. McGowan. Although it is silent, Little Mother followed Our Gang's first sound film, Small Talk, on the release schedule.

== Cast ==
=== The Gang ===
- Joe Cobb as Joe
- Jean Darling as Jean
- Allen Hoskins as Farina
- Bobby Hutchins as Wheezer
- Mary Ann Jackson as Mary Ann
- Harry Spear as Harry
- Donnie Smith as Beezer
- Pete the Pup as himself

=== Additional cast ===
- Charlie Hall as Taxi driver
- Charles Millsfield as Bearded man
- Warner Richmond as Father
- Gene Stone as Skinny man who gets showered
- Lyle Tayo as Mother/Aunt
- Ed Brandenburg as Bit

== See also ==
- Our Gang filmography
