= Stepin Fetchit =

American character actor (1902–1985)

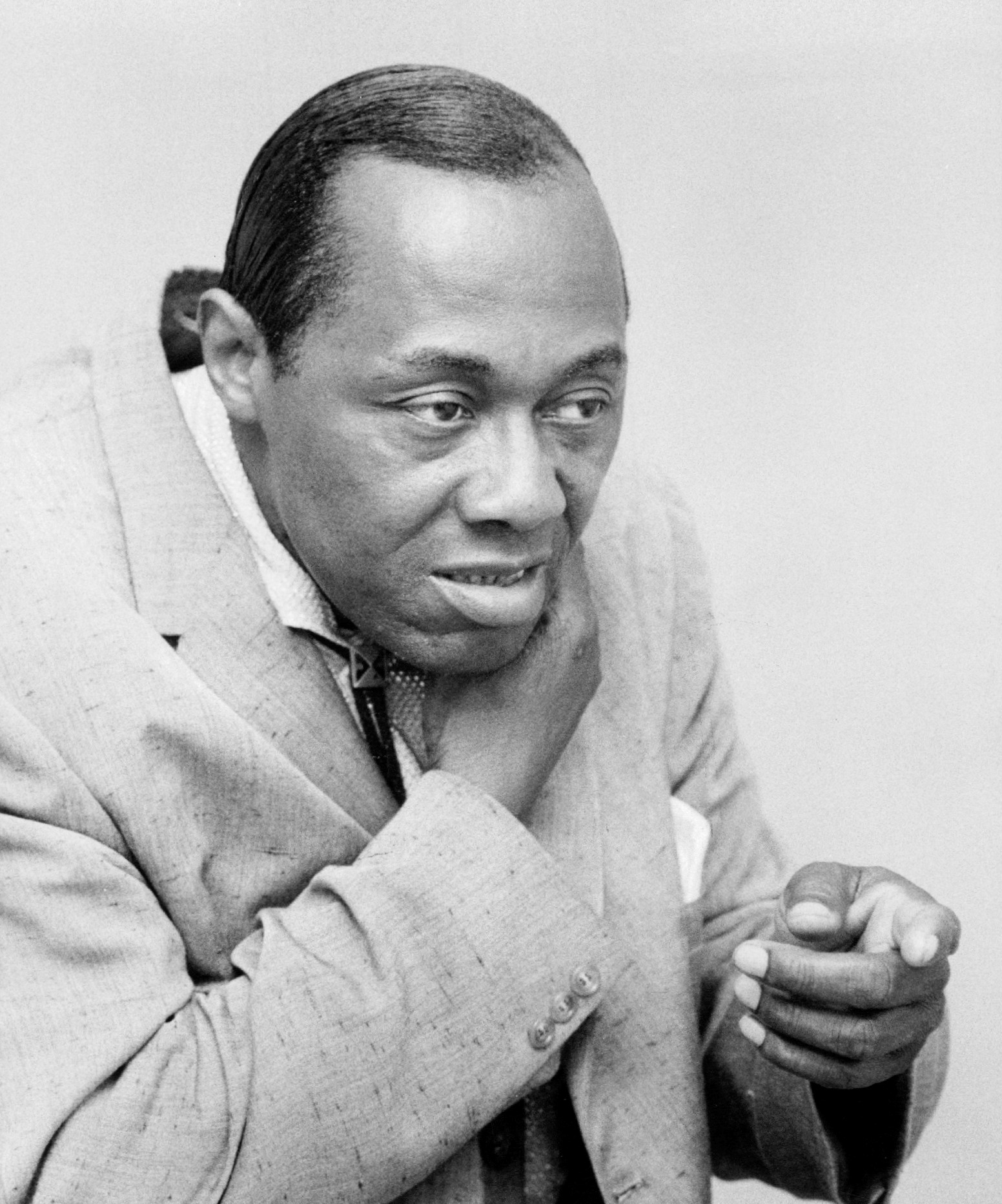
- Fetchit in 1959
- Born: Lincoln Theodore Monroe Andrew Perry; May 30, 1902; Key West, Florida, US
- Died: November 19, 1985 (aged 83); Woodland Hills, California, US
- Resting place: Calvary Cemetery, Los Angeles
- Occupations: Actor; comedian; vaudevillian
- Years active: 1914–1976
- Spouse(s): Dorothy Stevenson (1929–1931); Bernice Sims (1951–1984) (her death)
- Children: 2 (including Donald)

Lincoln Theodore Monroe Andrew Perry (May 30, 1902 – November 19, 1985), better known by his stage name Stepin Fetchit, was an American vaudevillian, comedian, and film actor of Jamaican and Bahamian descent, considered to be the first black actor to have a successful film career. His highest profile was during the 1930s in films and on stage, when his persona of Stepin Fetchit was billed as the "Laziest Man in the World".

Perry parlayed the Fetchit persona into a successful film career, becoming the first black actor to earn $1 million. He was also the first black actor to receive featured screen credit in a film.

Perry's film career slowed after 1939 and nearly stopped altogether after 1953. Around that time, Black Americans began to see his Stepin Fetchit persona as an embarrassing and harmful anachronism, echoing negative stereotypes. Writer Mel Watkins has since argued the Stepin Fetchit character is better described as a prankster rather than simply lazy.

== Early life ==
Little is known about Perry's background other than that he was born in Key West, Florida, to West Indian immigrants. He was the second child of Joseph Perry, a cigar maker from Jamaica (although some sources indicate the Bahamas) and Dora Monroe, a seamstress from Nassau. Both of his parents came to the United States in the 1890s, where they married. By 1910, the family had moved north to Tampa, Florida. Another source says he was adopted when he was 11 years old and taken to live in Montgomery, Alabama.

His mother wanted him to be a dentist, so Perry was adopted by a quack dentist, for whom he blacked boots before running away at age 12 to join a carnival. He earned his living for a few years as a singer and tap dancer.

== Vaudeville career ==
In his teens, Perry became a comic character actor. By the age of 20 he had become a vaudeville artist and the manager of a traveling carnival show. His stage name was a contraction of "step and fetch it". His accounts of how he adopted the name varied, but generally he claimed that it originated when he performed a vaudeville act with a partner. Perry won money betting on a racehorse named "Step and Fetch It", and his partner and he decided to adopt the names "Step" and "Fetchit" for their act. When Perry became a solo act, he combined the two names, which later became his professional name.

== Film career ==
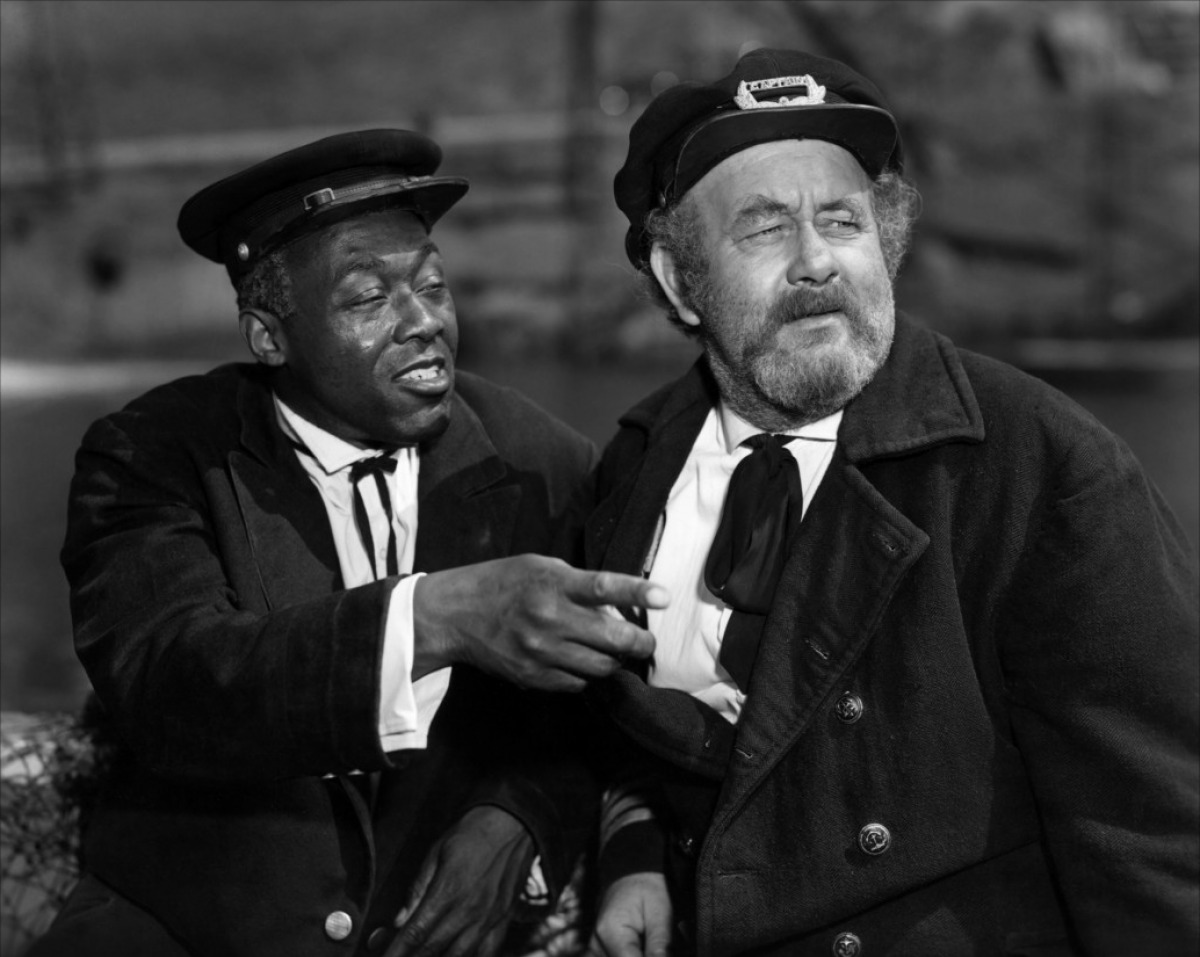
Perry and Chubby Johnson in Bend of the River (1952)

Perry played comic-relief roles in a number of films, all based on his character known as the "Laziest Man in the World". In his personal life, he was highly literate and had a concurrent career writing for The Chicago Defender. He signed a five-year studio contract following his performance in the film In Old Kentucky (1927). The film's plot included a romantic connection between him and actress Carolynne Snowden, a subplot that was a rarity for black actors appearing in a white film during this era. Perry also starred in Hearts in Dixie (1929), one of the first studio productions to boast a predominantly black cast.

Jules Bledsoe provided Perry's singing voice for his role as Joe in the 1929 version of Show Boat. Perry did not sing "Ol' Man River", but he did sing "The Lonesome Road" in the film. In 1930, Hal Roach signed him to a film contract to appear in nine Our Gang episodes in 1930 and 1931. However, his only appearance in the series was in A Tough Winter. Perry's contract was canceled for unknown reasons after its release.

Perry was good friends with fellow comic actor Will Rogers. They appeared together in David Harum (1934), Judge Priest (1934), Steamboat 'Round the Bend (1935), and The County Chairman (1935).

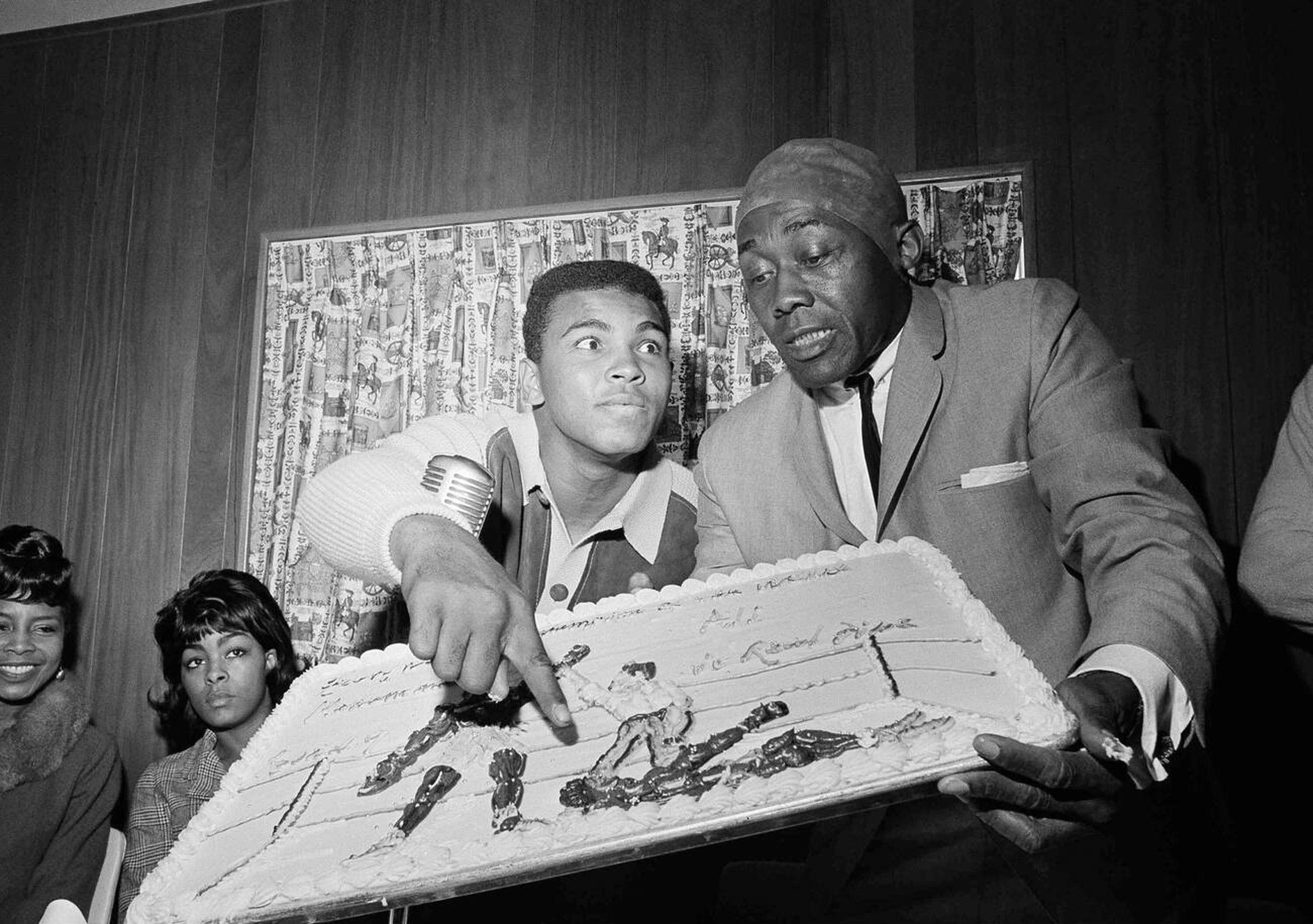
Perry and Ali in 1964

By the mid-1930s, Perry was the first black actor to become a millionaire. He appeared in 44 films between 1927 and 1939. In 1940, Perry temporarily stopped appearing in films, having been frustrated by his unsuccessful attempt to get equal pay and billing with his white costars. He returned in 1945, in part due to financial need, though he only appeared in eight films between 1945 and 1953. He declared bankruptcy in 1947, stating assets of $146.

He returned to vaudeville; he appeared at the Anderson Free Fair in 1949 alongside Singer's Midgets. He became a friend of heavyweight boxing champion Muhammad Ali in the 1960s, allegedly converting to the Nation of Islam shortly before. Other sources have said he was a lifelong Catholic; he was buried at Calvary Cemetery, a Catholic institution in Los Angeles.

After 1953, Perry appeared in cameos in the made-for-television movie Cutter (1972) and the feature films Amazing Grace (1974) and Won Ton Ton, the Dog Who Saved Hollywood (1976). He found himself in conflict during his career with civil rights leaders who criticized him personally for the film roles that he portrayed. In 1968, CBS aired the hour-long documentary Black History: Lost, Stolen, or Strayed, written by Andy Rooney (for which Rooney received an Emmy Award) and narrated by Bill Cosby, which criticized the depiction of black people in American film, and especially singled out Stepin Fetchit for criticism. After the show aired, Perry unsuccessfully sued CBS and the documentary's producers for defamation of character.

== Music composition ==
In late November 1963, Perry collaborated with Motown Records founder Berry Gordy Jr. and Esther Gordy Edwards in composing "May What He Lived for Live," a song intended to honor the memory of President John F. Kennedy in the wake of his assassination. Perry was credited under the pseudonym W.A. Bisson. The song was recorded in December 1963 by Liz Lands, who in 1968 performed the work at the funeral of the Rev. Martin Luther King Jr.

== Death ==
Perry suffered a stroke in 1976, ending his acting career. He then moved into the Motion Picture & Television Country House and Hospital. He died on November 19, 1985, from pneumonia and heart failure, at the age of 83. He was buried at Calvary Cemetery in East Los Angeles following a Catholic funeral Mass.

== Legacy ==
Perry spawned imitators, such as Willie Best ("Sleep 'n Eat") and Mantan Moreland, the scared, wide-eyed manservant of Charlie Chan. Perry had actually played a manservant in the Charlie Chan series before Moreland in 1935's Charlie Chan in Egypt.

Perry appeared in one 1930 Our Gang short subject, A Tough Winter, at the end of the 1929–30 season. Perry signed a contract to star with the gang in nine films for the 1930–31 season and be part of the Our Gang series, but for some unknown reason, the contract fell through, and the gang continued without Perry. Previous to Perry entering films, the Our Gang shorts had employed several black child actors, including Allen Hoskins, Jannie Hoskins, Ernest Morrison, and Eugene Jackson. In the sound Our Gang era, black actors Matthew Beard and Billie Thomas were featured. The black performers' personas in Our Gang shorts were the polar opposites of Perry's persona.

In the 2005 book Stepin Fetchit: The Life and Times of Lincoln Perry, African-American critic Mel Watkins argued that the character of Stepin Fetchit was not truly lazy or simple-minded, but instead a prankster who deliberately tricked his white employers so that they would do the work instead of him. This technique, which developed during American slavery, was referred to as "putting on old massa", and it was a kind of con art with which black audiences of the time would have been familiar.

=== Awards and honors ===
Perry has a star on the Hollywood Walk of Fame.

In 1976, despite popular aversion to his character, the Hollywood chapter of the NAACP awarded Perry a special NAACP Image Award. Two years later, he was inducted into the Black Filmmakers Hall of Fame.

== Personal life ==
In 1929, Perry married Dorothy Stevenson. She gave birth to their son, Jemajo, on September 12, 1930. In 1931, Dorothy filed for divorce, stating that Perry had broken her nose, jaw, and arm with "his fists and a broomstick." A few weeks after their divorce was granted, Dorothy told a reporter she hoped someone would "just beat the devil out of him," as he had done to her. In spite of the bitter divorce, they remained in contact. When Dorothy contracted tuberculosis in 1933, Perry moved her to Arizona for treatment. She died in September 1934; Perry paid for a 'lavish' funeral, reckoned at the time to embody 'a touch of the Hollywood spectacular' given the presence of persistent Fox newsreel photographers.

Perry reportedly married Winifred Johnson in 1937, but no record of their union has been found. On May 21, 1938, Winifred gave birth to a son, Donald Martin Perry. Their relationship ended soon after Donald's birth. According to Winifred's brother, Stretch Johnson, their father intervened after Perry knocked Winifred down the stairs and broke her nose.

In 1941, Perry was arrested after Winifred filed a suit for child support. When he was released from jail, he told reporters, "Winnie and I were never married. It was all a publicity stunt. I want you and everybody else to know that that is not my baby. Winnie knows the baby isn't mine but she's trying to be smart." Winifred admitted that they were not legally married, but she insisted Perry was her son's father. The court ruled in her favor and ordered Perry to pay $12 a week (equivalent to $263 in 2025) for the child's support. Donald later took his stepfather's surname, Lambright. (Note: On April 5, 1969, Donald Lambright was traveling along the Pennsylvania Turnpike, east of Harrisburg, Pennsylvania, when he went on a spree shooting. Reportedly, he injured sixteen and killed four, including his wife, with an M1 carbine and a .30-caliber Marlin 336 carbine, before turning one of the rifles on himself. The 1969 Pennsylvania Turnpike shootings were officially ruled a murder-suicide, but the account of the circumstances upon which the ruling was based was questioned by Lambright's daughter and discussed at length in her 2005 self-published book about Stepin Fetchit. In a Los Angeles Times interview, Lincoln Perry stated his belief that his son was set up. Lambright's involvement with the Black Power movement at the peak of the COINTELPRO program was believed to be related to his death. Perry never provided child support for Lambright, and they only met two years before his son's violent death.)

Perry married Bernice Sims on October 15, 1951. Although they separated by the mid-1950s, they remained married for the rest of their lives. Bernice died on January 9, 1985.

For at least the great majority of his life, Perry was an observant Roman Catholic. He allegedly became a member of the Nation of Islam in the early 1960s, following the footsteps of his close friends Muhammad Ali and Malcolm X, even appearing in the 1977 movie Muhammad Ali, the Greatest. Other sources say he was a lifelong Catholic. He was buried at Calvary Cemetery, a Catholic institution in Los Angeles.

== Filmography ==
- The Mysterious Stranger (1925)
- In Old Kentucky (1927) – Highpockets
- The Devil's Skipper (1928) – Slave's Husband
- Nameless Men (1928)
- The Tragedy of Youth (1928) – Porter
- The Kid's Clever (1929) – Negro Man
- The Ghost Talks (1929) – Christopher Lee
- Hearts in Dixie (1929) – Gummy
- Show Boat (1929) – Joe
- Thru Different Eyes (1929) – Janitor
- Innocents of Paris (1929) – Bit Role (uncredited)
- Fox Movietone Follies of 1929 (1929) – Swifty
- Salute (1929) – Smoke Screen
- Big Time (1929) – Eli
- Cameo Kirby (1930) – Croup
- The Big Fight (1930) – Spot
- Swing High (1930) – Sam
- La Fuerza del Querer (1930) – Spot
- A Tough Winter (1930, Short) – Stepin
- The Prodigal (1931) – Hokey
- Wild Horse (1931) – Stepin
- The Galloping Ghost (1931) – Baxter College Locker Room Attendant
- Neck and Neck (1931) – The Hustler
- Carolina (1934) – Scipio
- David Harum (1934) – Sylvester Swifty
- Stand Up and Cheer! (1934) – Stepin Fetchit
- The World Moves On (1934) – Dixie
- Judge Priest (1934) – Jeff Poindexter
- Marie Galante (1934) – 'Pacific Gardens' Waiter (uncredited)
- Bachelor of Arts (1934) – Bulga
- The Littlest Rebel (1935)
- Helldorado (1935) – Ulysses
- The County Chairman (1935) – Sass
- One More Spring (1935) – Zoo Attendant
- Charlie Chan in Egypt (1935) – Snowshoes
- Hot Tip (1935) – Cook
- Steamboat Round the Bend (1935) – Jonah
- Annie Oakley (1935) - cook's helper
- The Virginia Judge (1935) – Spasm Johnson
- 36 Hours to Kill (1936) – Flash
- Dimples (1936) – Cicero
- On the Avenue (1937) – Herman
- Love Is News (1937) – Penrod
- Fifty Roads to Town (1937) – Percy
- Super-Sleuth (1937) – (uncredited)
- His Exciting Night (1938) – Casper, the Baker Butler
- Zenobia (1939) – Zero
- Open the Door Richard (1945)
- Big Timers (1945, Short) – Porter / Specialty Act
- Swingtime Jamboree (1946)
- I Ain't Gonna Open That Door (1947, Short) – Richard
- Miracle in Harlem (1948) – 'Swifty', the Handyman
- Harlem Follies of 1949 (1950)
- Bend of the River (1952) – Adam
- The Sun Shines Bright (1953) – Jeff Poindexter
- Inquiring Nuns (1968, interviewee)
- Cutter (1972, TV movie) – Shoeshine Man
- Muhammad Ali, the Greatest (1974)
- Amazing Grace (1974, cameo appearance) – Cousin Lincoln
- Brother, Can You Spare a Dime? (1975, archival footage)
- Won Ton Ton, the Dog Who Saved Hollywood (1976, cameo appearance) – Dancing Butler (final film role)

== See also ==
- Amos 'n' Andy
- Jar Jar Binks
- Blackface
- Buckwheat, a character played by Billie Thomas in the 1930s U.S. short film series Our Gang
- Dudley Dickerson
- Billy Kersands
- "Old Aunt Jemima"
- Pickaninny
- Fred Toones
- Uncle Tom

== Sources ==
- Katz, Ephraim (1979). The Film Encyclopedia. Thomas Y. Crowell, New York. ISBN 0-690-01204-7.
- Watkins, Mel (2005). Stepin Fetchit: The Life and Times of Lincoln Perry. Pantheon Books. ISBN 0-375-42382-6.
- Clark, Champ (2005). Shuffling to Ignominy: The Tragedy of Stepin Fetchit. iUniverse. ISBN 0-595-37125-6.
