= Mel Watkins (American writer) =

American critic and author (born 1940)

- Born: March 8, 1940 (age 85); Memphis, Tennessee, US
- Occupation(s): author, writer

Mel Watkins (born March 8, 1940) is an American critic and author. A former staff member at The New York Times, he has written extensively about comedy and African-American literature and has often appeared as a commentator in television documentaries about entertainment history and performers such as Chris Rock and Richard Pryor.

== Biography ==
Watkins joined the New York Times in 1964 and, in 1966, became the first African-American editor at the Times Sunday Book Review, where he worked until 1985. He contributed numerous book reviews and articles on literature, sports, and entertainment as well as obituaries of artists and writers ranging from George Carlin, Richard Pryor and Rodney Dangerfield to Gwendolyn Brooks. He was the Book Page editor for Penthouse (1977–1978) and American Visions (1986–1991) magazines. In 1979, he was the recipient of an Alicia Patterson journalism fellowship; his research on African-American humor led to publication of the highly acclaimed social history, On the Real Side: Laughing, Lying and Signifying–The Underground Tradition of African American Humor That Transformed American Culture (1994). (A revised edition, On the Real Side: A History of African American Comedy, was published in 1999.)

Watkins first published book was Black Review (1971); the paperback literary anthology, which he edited, included contributions by Julius Lester, Cecil Brown, Nikki Giovanni, and others. Subsequent books include Dancing with Strangers: A Memoir (1998), The Bob Love Story (2000), and African American Humor: The Best Black Comedy from Slavery to Today (2002). His latest book is Stepin Fetchit: The Life and Times of Lincoln Perry (2005), a biography of the pioneer African-American motion picture actor.

Watkins, who was born in Memphis, Tennessee, and grew up in Youngstown, Ohio, now lives in New York City, where he continues to write, lecture, and appear for speaking engagements. A graduate of Colgate University (1962) who is listed among its Distinguished Alumni, he has been the NEH Professor of Humanities in the English department at the university since 2007 .

== Bibliography ==
- Black Review No. 1 (1971), Editor
- To Be a Black Woman: Portraits in Fact and Fiction (1971), Editor
- Black Review No. 2 (1972), Editor
- Race and Suburbia (Issues and Perspectives: A New York Times Resource Library) (1973)
- Howard University Press Library of Contemporary Literature—Introductions to first six volumes (1984)
- On the Real Side (1994)
- Inside the Minstrel Mask: Readings in Nineteenth Century Blackface
- Minstrelsy (1996)—Foreword
- Dancing With Strangers (1998)
- The Bob Love Story (2000), With Bob Love
- African American Humor (2002)
- Who Killed Tiffany Jones? (2002)
- Stepin Fetchit: The Life and Times of Lincoln Perry (2006)
