= Waldo's Last Stand =

- Directed by: Edward Cahn
- Written by: Hal Law; Robert A. McGowan
- Produced by: Jack Chertok; Richard Goldstone for MGM
- Starring: Mickey Gubitosi; Darla Hood; George McFarland; Carl Switzer; Billie Thomas; Darwood Kaye; Leonard Landy; Billy Laughlin
- Cinematography: Jackson Rose
- Edited by: Albert Akst
- Distributed by: MGM
- Release date: October 5, 1940
- Running time: 10:39
- Country: United States
- Language: English
- Budget: $18,974 (estimated)

Waldo's Last Stand is a 1940 Our Gang short comedy film directed by Edward Cahn. It was the 193rd Our Gang short to be released.

== Plot ==
The gang offers to help Waldo attract customers to his lemonade stand which is doing poor business. Redecorating their barn as a lavish nightclub, the kids stage an elaborate floor show, with Darla as the star vocalist. Unfortunately, their efforts attract only one patron—a surly, stone-faced new kid named Froggy. Spanky and the others try to persuade Froggy to buy a drink, even going as far as singing an impromptu song about dryness and thirst, but to no avail. The kids then come up with an idea: to put a heater under Froggy which would heat him up and force him to buy a drink. When Spanky asks Froggy why he would not buy a drink, Froggy responds that he does not have any money and that it is too hot in the barn. The gang realizes that no one other than Froggy showed up for the show because all the other neighborhood kids were either participant in the show or somehow connected with its production.

== Cast ==
=== The Gang ===
- Mickey Gubitosi as Mickey
- Darla Hood as Darla
- George McFarland as Spanky
- Carl Switzer as Alfalfa
- Billie Thomas as Buckwheat
- Darwood Kaye as Waldo
- Leonard Landy as Leonard

=== Additional cast ===
- Billy Laughlin as Froggy
- Janet Burston as Jeanette
- Clyde Willson as Clyde

=== Dancers/Performers in the floor show ===
Lavonne Battle, Shirley Jean Doble, Donna Jean Edmonsond, Helen Guthrie, Patsy Irish, Jackie Krenk, Bobby Sommers, Betty Jean Striegler (Betta St. John), Mary Ann Such, Patsy Anne Thompson, Patricia Wheeler

== Notes ==
- Another Our Ganger leaves as Waldo's Last Stand marked the final appearance of Darwood Kaye. Kaye's film career is described in the 2009 book, Finding Waldo, written by one of his four sons.
- Waldo's Last Stand is one of four sound Our Gang shorts (and the only MGM-produced entry) that fell into the public domain after the copyright lapsed in the 1960s (the other three being Bear Shooters, School's Out and Our Gang Follies of 1938). As such, these films frequently appear on inexpensive video and/or DVD compilations.

== See also ==
- Our Gang filmography
