= Buddy McDonald =

American child actor (1922–2008)

- Born: Thomas McDonald; October 1, 1922; Coalinga, California, US
- Died: September 22, 2008 (aged 85); Seal Beach, California, US
- Other names: Buddy, Bud
- Occupation: Child actor
- Spouse: Marcie
- Children: 3

Thomas "Buddy"/"Bud" McDonald (October 1, 1922 – September 22, 2008) was an American child actor. He is perhaps best known as one of the Our Gang kids of the early sound period, and McDonald is prominently featured in the Our Gang shorts Teacher's Pet and School's Out. He appeared in several of the Our Gang comedies.

== Biography ==
=== Early career ===
McDonald was discovered when his mother wrote a letter, dictated from his father to Hal Roach Studios in Culver City, in which they enclosed a newspaper article of Buddy's local spelling bee win. They received a phone call from the studio that same week.

The studio gave him a screen test and called Buddy to work on his first picture, Pups is Pups. From there, he worked on various bit parts with Paramount Pictures and Metro-Goldwyn-Mayer. In addition, he sang on Juvenile review, a weekend radio program on KFWB in Los Angeles. He attended grammar school on the studio lot with his fellow Our Gang actors. Additionally, he did scenes with Thelma Todd, Zasu Pitts and Charley Chase.

=== Childhood ===
Growing up in Bell, California. His parents separated in 1933, he and his mother and two brothers went to live with his aunt in Oregon. There they picked fruit. Within a year, his family had made enough money to move back to their old house in Bell.

While he and his mother were living in Oregon, the studio had called asking for Buddy to do more work in the pictures. However, by the time they moved back to Bell, the calls had stopped, thus ending his childhood "career" in acting.

=== After Our Gang ===
During Prohibition, his father owned a cafe on Florence Avenue in Bell and after Prohibition was repealed, he turned it into a bar.

Buddy became famous in the community, as he was the only person living there at the time that was in pictures. As a teenager, he had problems with alcohol. McDonald was expelled from Bell High School and later attended Jacob August Riis High School in Los Angeles, a reform school for boys.

In later years, McDonald joined the United States Marine Corps, during World War II but broke his leg in boot camp and was honorably discharged. After a run-in with the law, he went to Alcoholics Anonymous as part of a reduced sentence deal. Upon his release from jail in March 1953, Buddy attended his first meeting of Alcoholics Anonymous and stayed sober until the end of his life. After more than 10 years of being sober, he and a friend, Judge Leon Emerson, started what they named the "Dana" School (Drugs, Alcohol, Narcotics, Awareness) in Downey, California. In 1972, they formed the Southern California Alcohol and Drug Program (formerly the Southwest Council) and in 1975, opened their first recovery house, the Cider House in Norwalk, California. In 1985, they established an additional recovery house for women and their children, Foley House in Whittier, California. This was the first place where addicted women could keep their children with them in a supportive controlled environment while getting clean and sober. This model for women's recovery has been used many times and is now considered the best practice method. Women who were separated from their children and labeled "unfit mothers", due to their substance abuse problems, now had a chance to succeed and keep their families together. They added parenting classes and work training in their attempt to allow the women to succeed once they left Foley House.

== Death ==
After Marcia's death in 1996, Buddy McDonald moved to the retirement community of Leisure World in Seal Beach, California. He served as Chairman of the Board of Directors for the Southern California Drug and Alcohol Abuse Center and remained active in helping recovering alcoholics.

McDonald suffered from congestive heart failure and died in his home on September 22, 2008, at 85.
