= Malcolm Sabiston =

American actor (1923–2006)

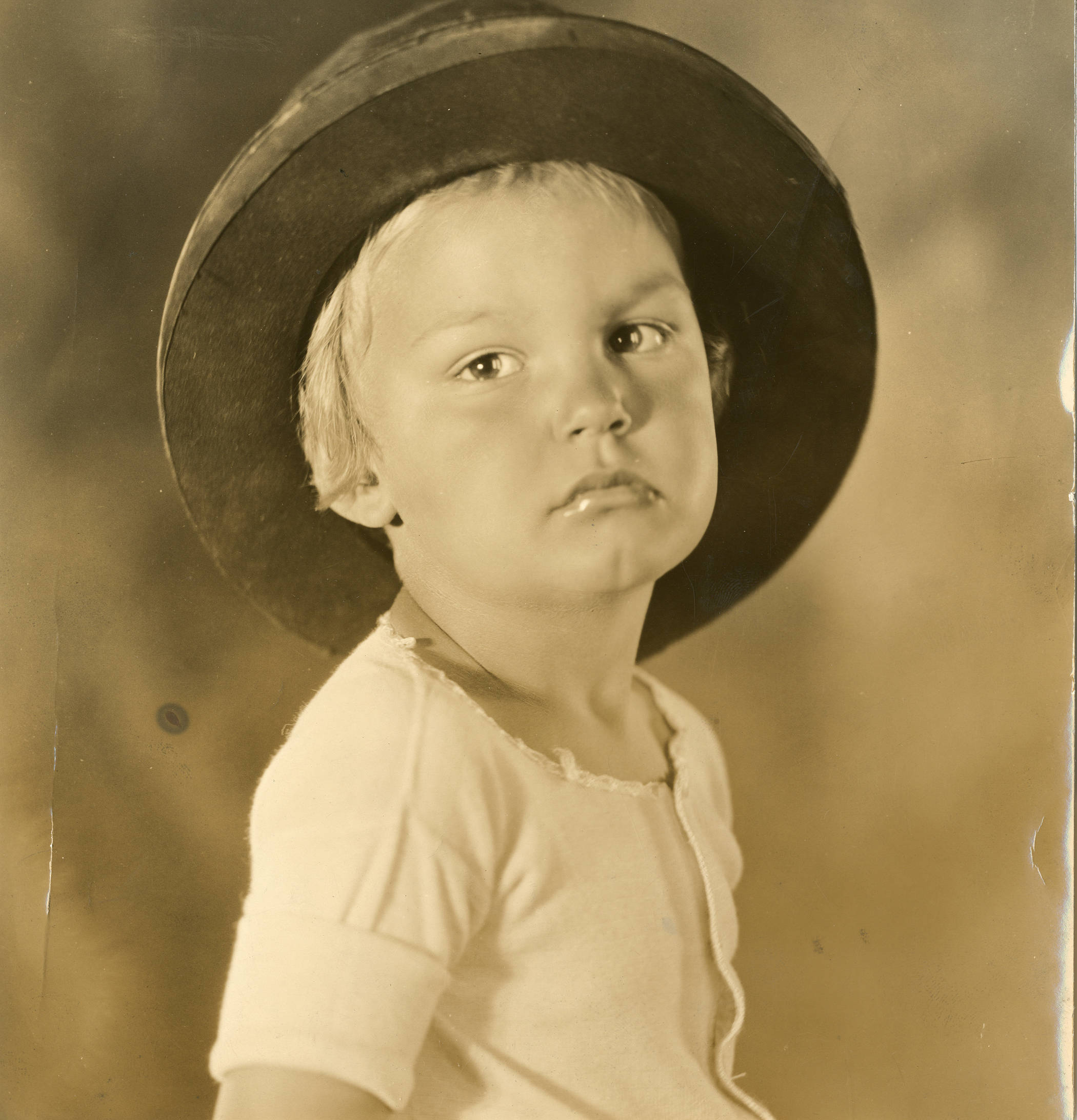
- Born: Malcolm Sabiston; November 4, 1923; Los Angeles, California
- Died: July 18, 2006 (aged 82); Oceanside, California
- Other name: Big Boy
- Occupation: Child actor
- Years active: 1924-1930

Malcolm Sabiston (November 4, 1923 – July 18, 2006) was an American child actor who played "Big Boy" in Educational Pictures' Juvenile Comedies series.
