= Cat, Dog & Co. =

1929 film

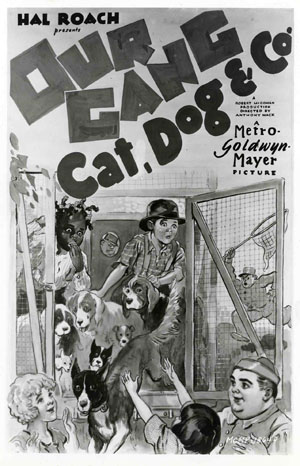
- Film poster
- Directed by: Anthony Mack
- Written by: Anthony Mack; H. M. Walker
- Produced by: Robert F. McGowan; Hal Roach
- Starring: Joe Cobb; Jean Darling; Allen Hoskins; Bobby Hutchins; Mary Ann Jackson; Harry Spear; Donnie Smith; Pete the Pup; Chet Brandenburg; Hedda Hopper
- Cinematography: Art Lloyd
- Edited by: Richard C. Currier
- Distributed by: Metro-Goldwyn-Mayer
- Release date: September 14, 1929
- Running time: 20:52
- Country: United States
- Languages: Silent; English intertitles

Cat, Dog & Co. is a 1929 Our Gang short silent comedy film, the 91st in the series, directed by Anthony Mack.

== Plot ==
Cat, Dog & Co. (1929)

Joe, Farina and Harry are racing their dog-powered cars when they are stopped and reported to the president of the Be Kind to Animals Society. After promising to be kind to animals, the boys are made honorary society members. They soon convince other children to be kind to animals, and they release the animals from their cages, causing chaos.

== Cast ==
=== The Gang ===
- Joe Cobb as Joe
- Jean Darling as Jean
- Allen Hoskins as Farina
- Bobby Hutchins as Wheezer
- Mary Ann Jackson as Mary Ann
- Harry Spear as Harry
- Donnie Smith as Don
- Pete the Pup as Pete

=== Additional cast ===
- Chet Brandenburg as Taxi driver
- Ray Cooke as Pedestrian
- Clara Guiol as Pedestrian
- Jack Hill as Pedestrian
- Hedda Hopper as President of the Be Kind to Animals Society
- John B. O'Brien as Fruit vendor
- Bob Saunders as Trucker
- Syd Saylor as Pedestrian
- Dorothy Vernon as Pedestrian
- Adele Watson as Lady who snitched
- S. D. Wilcox as Officer

== See also ==
- Our Gang filmography
