= The Bohemian Girl (1936 film) =

1936 film

- Theatrical release poster
- Directed by: James W. Horne; Charles Rogers
- Written by: Frank Butler
- Based on: The Bohemian Girl; 1843 opera by Balfe
- Produced by: Hal Roach
- Starring: Stan Laurel; Oliver Hardy; Antonio Moreno; Jacqueline Wells
- Cinematography: Francis Corby; Art Lloyd
- Edited by: Bert Jordan; Louis McManus
- Music by: Robert Shayon; Nathaniel Shilkret
- Production companies: Hal Roach Studios; Metro-Goldwyn-Mayer
- Distributed by: Loew's, Inc.
- Release date: February 14, 1936
- Running time: 68 minutes
- Country: United States
- Language: English

The Bohemian Girl is a 1936 American comedic feature film version of the opera The Bohemian Girl by Michael William Balfe. Directed by James W. Horne and Charles Rogers, it was produced at the Hal Roach Studios and stars Laurel and Hardy, and Thelma Todd in her final film role. This was the last of thirteen pictures of Mae Busch and Oliver Hardy together. This was also the only appearance of Darla Hood in a full-length feature produced by Hal Roach.

== Plot ==
A group of gypsy caravans set up on the edge of a wood. They realise they are camped on the estate of Count Arnheim who will not tolerate their presence. The gypsies sing and dance to entertain themselves.

Stanley Laurel and Oliver Hardy are the misfit pair of Gypsies in the group. When hen-pecked Oliver is out pickpocketing, fortune-telling or attending his zither lessons, his wife has an affair with Devilshoof. A cruel nobleman, Count Arnheim, persecutes the Gypsies, who are forced to flee, but Mrs. Hardy, in revenge for Devilshoof being lashed on the Count's orders, kidnaps the Count's daughter, Arline, and Mrs. Hardy fools Hardy into thinking she is their daughter, since he believes everything she tells him. She soon elopes with Devilshoof, and leaves Oliver and "Uncle" Stanley holding the toddler. Arline is too young to remember her old life.

Twelve years later, the Gypsies return to Arnheim's estate. When grown-up Arline accidentally trespasses in Arnheim's garden, she recognises the place and Arnheim's voice, but is arrested by the captain of the guard and sentenced to a lashing. Stan and Oliver try to save her, but Stan is too drunk and both are arrested. Just as Arline is stripped in order to be lashed, she is rescued in time by Arnheim, who recognizes a medallion she wears and a family birthmark, and both try to rescue Stan and Oliver. It is too late though: Laurel and Hardy had already been worked over in the torture chamber: Hardy emerges stretched to a height of eight feet, while Stan has been crushed to only a few feet tall and the captain of the guard just stands yelling and moaning.

== Cast ==
- Stan Laurel as Stan
- Oliver Hardy as Ollie
- Jacqueline Wells as Arline
  - Darla Hood as Arline as a child
- Mae Busch as Mrs. Hardy
- Antonio Moreno as Devilshoof, Mrs. Hardy's lover
- William P. Carleton as Count of Arnheim
- James Finlayson as Finn, Captain of the Guard
- Zeffie Tilbury as old Gypsy Queen
- Mitchell Lewis as Salinas, Gypsy Queen's advisor
- Harry Bowen as Laurel and Hardy's first victim (the drunkard)
- Sam Lufkin as Laurel and Hardy's second victim (the innkeeper)
- Eddie Borden as Laurel and Hardy's third victim (the nobleman)
- James C. Morton as the officer who arrests the nobleman
- Harry Bernard as bell ringer
- Thelma Todd as singer of "Heart of a Gypsy"
- Felix Knight as singer of "Then You'll Remember Me"
- Winter Hall as Servant (uncredited)
- Howard C. Hickman as Dignified Captain (uncredited)
- Laughing Gravy as Dog

== Casting and production details ==
Metro-Goldwyn-Mayer wanted to cast a talented newcomer as Arline. Hal Roach cast Darla Hood, who had just begun appearing in Roach's Our Gang comedies, as young Arline and Jacqueline Wells as adult Arline.

Rosina Lawrence dubs Jacqueline Wells's singing.

Paulette Goddard has a small uncredited role as a Gypsy.

Stan Laurel's pet myna, Yogi, appears in the film.

The Count was played by William P. Carleton, who had played the role on stage over a number of decades.

Thelma Todd died during production. Due to the controversy and rumors surrounding the circumstances of her death, most of Todd's scenes were cut and a few re-filmed with Zeffie Tilbury replacing Todd in the role. Todd appeared only in a musical number in the final release.

== Ban in Malaysia and Germany ==
The film was banned in Malaysia due to its depictions of Roma themes. It was also banned in Nazi Germany due to its positive depiction of gypsies, which Joseph Goebbels, the minister of propaganda for the regime, said "had no place" in the Third Reich.
