= James C. Morton =

American actor (1884–1942)

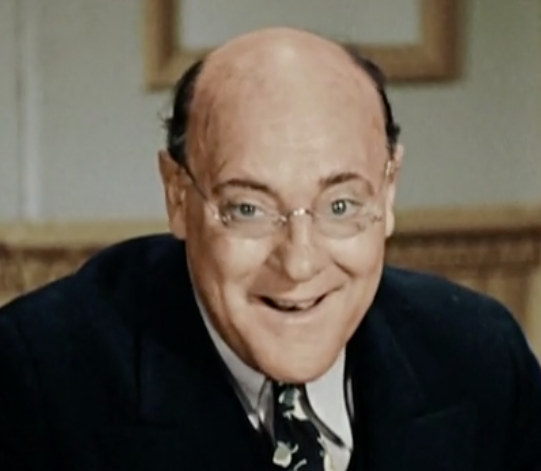
- Morton in The Three Stooges film Disorder in the Court (1936)
- Born: James Carmody Lankton; August 25, 1884; Helena, Montana, U.S.
- Died: October 24, 1942 (aged 58); Reseda, Los Angeles, California, U.S.
- Resting place: Holy Cross Cemetery, Culver City
- Years active: 1910–1942

James Carmody Lankton (August 25, 1884 – October 24, 1942), known professionally as James C. Morton, was an American character actor, specializing in short-tempered judges, police officers and officials. He appeared in more than 180 films between 1922 and 1942, often in "straight man" roles against legendary comedy troupes.

== Career ==
Born in Helena, Montana, Morton is best known to modern audiences as the hapless soul whose toupée was often removed at the most inopportune times. Perhaps the best known example of this embarrassment is in the Three Stooges film Disorder in the Court, in which Larry Fine's violin bow yanks Morton's hairpiece off. The Stooges then misinterpret the toupée as a wild tarantula, leading Moe Howard to grab a pistol from a court bailiff and shoot it.

Another example is in the 1935 Our Gang short Beginner's Luck where Morton is a piano accompanist to the amateur talent in a neighborhood kids' show, and the Rascals—causing all kinds of raucous disarray in the front row—knock off his toupée with a gust of air; Morton turns to them saying, "You kids are beginning to get into my hair!" Morton also appeared as the bartender who provides Oliver Hardy with a wooden mallet to shut up Stan Laurel singing "The Trail of the Lonesome Pine" in the film Way Out West.

Morton appeared in many Hal Roach productions, playing supporting roles with Our Gang and Laurel and Hardy, and also played a small role in Charlie Chaplin's Modern Times. Approaching 50 he performed a difficult backwards fall and lifted himself into a headstand using only his neck muscles for the Pitts and Todd 1932 short The Soilers, directed by George Marshall.

On the Los Angeles stage Morton played the title role of Tik-Tok in The Tik-Tok Man of Oz (1913), by L. Frank Baum, Louis F. Gottschalk, Victor Schertzinger and Oliver Morosco.

In the early 1910s Morton appeared in a vaudeville and burlesque duo, Morton & Moore, with actor Frank Moore, playing at the Alhambra Theatre in Harlem and in The Merry Whirl on Broadway.

== Death ==
Morton died of chronic myocarditis on October 24, 1942, in Reseda, California at age 58. He had suffered from the condition for approximately 11 years.

== Selected filmography ==
- The Barnstormers (1922, Short)
- Follow the Leader (1930) - Mickie
- Pack Up Your Troubles (1932) - Policeman (uncredited)
- A Lad an' a Lamp (1932, Short) - Officer
- The Devil's Brother (Fra Diavolo outside the US, 1933) - Woodchopper
- The Nuisance (1933) - Motorist (uncredited)
- Me and My Pal (1933, Short) - Traffic Cop (uncredited)
- The Midnight Patrol (1933, Short) - Policeman (uncredited)
- House of Mystery (1934) - Englishman (uncredited)
- You're Telling Me! (1934) - George Smith - Gossip (uncredited)
- Sing and Like It (1934) - Tied Up Mug (uncredited)
- Wild Gold (1934) - Mine Owner (uncredited)
- Operator 13 (1934) - Secret Service Man (uncredited)
- Another Wild Idea (1934, Short) - Milkman (uncredited)
- Mike Fright (1934, Short) - Mr. Morton - Station Manager
- Death on the Diamond (1934) - Husband (uncredited)
- Tit for Tat (1935, Short) - Policeman (uncredited)
- The Fixer Uppers (1935, Short) - Policeman (uncredited)
- Beginner's Luck (1935, Short) - Piano player
- Naughty Marietta (1935) - Herald (uncredited)
- Times Square Lady (1935) - Bartender (uncredited)
- Uncivil Warriors (1935, Short) - Union General (uncredited)
- Public Hero ﹟1 (1935) - Road House Patron (uncredited)
- Pardon My Scotch (1935, Short) - J.T. Walton
- O'Shaughnessy's Boy (1935) - Man on Train Who Wants to Sleep (uncredited)
- Hoi Polloi (1935, Short) - Party Guest wearing toupée (uncredited)
- Hot Off the Press (1935)
- Oh, My Nerves (1935, Short)
- The Payoff (1935) - Bartender (uncredited)
- The Timid Young Man (1935, Short) - Helen's Father (uncredited)
- A Night at the Opera (1935) - Opera Spectator (uncredited)
- Thanks a Million (1935) - Frank Slocum (uncredited)
- Frisco Kid (1935) - Minor Role (uncredited)
- King of Burlesque (1936) - Jim - the Bartender (uncredited)
- Modern Times (1936) - Assembly Line Relief Man (uncredited)
- Ants in the Pantry (1936, Short) - Guest w / toupee in piano scene (uncredited)
- The Bohemian Girl (1936) - Constable (uncredited)
- It Had to Happen (1936) - Bartender (uncredited)
- Song of the Saddle (1936) - Settler (uncredited)
- The Lucky Corner (1936, Short) - Officer
- Disorder in the Court (1936, Short) - Court Clerk (uncredited)
- Ticket to Paradise (1936) - Bartender (uncredited)
- A Pain in the Pullman (1936, Short) - Paul Payne (uncredited)
- Kelly the Second (1936) - Policeman Mike (uncredited)
- Our Relations (1936) - Beer Garden Bartender (uncredited)
- Two in a Crowd (1936) - Policeman (uncredited)
- Easy to Take (1936) - Police Sergeant (uncredited)
- The Accusing Finger (1936) - Bill Poster (uncredited)
- Arizona Mahoney (1936) - Bald-Headed Man (uncredited)
- She's Dangerous (1937) - Lunch Room Proprietor
- Join the Marines (1937) - Policeman (uncredited)
- Two Wise Maids (1937) - Sergeant Abbot
- Dizzy Doctors (1937, Short) - Man on Street (uncredited)
- Way Out West (1937) - Bartender (uncredited)
- Pick a Star (1937) - Bartender (uncredited)
- Slave Ship (1937) - Waiter (uncredited)
- Rhythm in the Clouds (1937) - Cop
- Brothers of the West (1937) - Mitchell - Cattleman's Protective Assoc. Chief
- Flying Fists (1937) - Referee (uncredited)
- The Lady Escapes (1937) - Doorman (uncredited)
- Public Cowboy No. 1 (1937) - Eustace P. Quackenbush
- The Shadow Strikes (1937) - Kelly
- Merry-Go-Round of 1938 (1937) - Waiter (uncredited)
- The Sitter Downers (1937, Short) - Mr. Bell (uncredited)
- Every Day's a Holiday (1937) - Bartender (uncredited)
- Mama Runs Wild (1937) - Adams
- International Settlement (1938) - Bartender (uncredited)
- International Crime (1938) - Radio Listener (uncredited)
- Healthy, Wealthy and Dumb (1938, Short) - Hotel Manager (uncredited)
- Alexander's Ragtime Band (1938) - Bartender at Scarbie's (uncredited)
- Josette (1938) - Bartender (uncredited)
- Speed to Burn (1938) - Bartender (uncredited)
- City Streets (1938) - Drunk (uncredited)
- Three Missing Links (1938, Short) - B.O. Botswaddle (uncredited)
- Letter of Introduction (1938) - Cop at Fire (uncredited)
- Block-Heads (1938) - James - the Porter (uncredited)
- Straight Place and Show (1938) - Bald Man (uncredited)
- Prairie Moon (1938) - Bald Chicago Tenement Man (uncredited)
- Stablemates (1938) - Bartender (uncredited)
- His Exciting Night (1938) - Policeman (uncredited)
- Secrets of a Nurse (1938) - Bartender (uncredited)
- Up the River (1938) - Hap (uncredited)
- California Frontier (1938) - Bartender Hank (uncredited)
- Kentucky (1938) - Bartender (uncredited)
- Topper Takes a Trip (1938) - First Bailiff (uncredited)
- Three Little Sew and Sews (1939, Short) - Admiral H.S. Taylor (uncredited)
- Four Girls in White (1939) - Policeman at Drug Store (uncredited)
- You Can't Cheat an Honest Man (1939) - Judge (uncredited)
- We Want Our Mummy (1939, Short) - Prof. Wilson (uncredited)
- Sergeant Madden (1939) - Fight Announcer (scenes deleted)
- Rose of Washington Square (1939) - Speakeasy Bartender (uncredited)
- Tell No Tales (1939) - Crowd Control Policeman (uncredited)
- It Could Happen to You (1939) - Detective (uncredited)
- News Is Made at Night (1939) - Bartender (uncredited)
- Mutiny on the Blackhawk (1939) - Ship's Cook (uncredited)
- Miracles for Sale (1939) - Blackie the Electrician (uncredited)
- When Tomorrow Comes (1939) - Bill, the Chef (uncredited)
- Blackmail (1939) - Second Policeman Arresting John (uncredited)
- The Arizona Kid (1939) - Bartender Joe (uncredited)
- The Housekeeper's Daughter (1939) - Policeman (uncredited)
- Call a Messenger (1939) - Policeman (uncredited)
- Meet Dr. Christian (1939) - City Council Member (uncredited)
- Swanee River (1939) - Bartender (uncredited)
- The Fatal Hour (1940) - Policeman Clancy (uncredited)
- Danger on Wheels (1940) - Police Sergeant (uncredited)
- My Little Chickadee (1940) - Train Conductor (uncredited)
- The Courageous Dr. Christian (1940) - Bailey
- Free, Blonde and 21 (1940) - Proprietor (uncredited)
- Saps at Sea (1940) - (uncredited)
- Lillian Russell (1940) - Bartender (uncredited)
- Those Were the Days! (1940) - Conductor (uncredited)
- I Can't Give You Anything But Love, Baby (1940) - Policeman (uncredited)
- Bad Man from Red Butte (1940) - Baldy (uncredited)
- Black Diamonds (1940) - Joseph Aloysius Stacey
- When the Daltons Rode (1940) - Ed Pickett - Juror (uncredited)
- The Return of Frank James (1940) - Liberty Bartender (uncredited)
- Earl of Puddlestone (1940) - Officer Brannigan
- Colorado (1940) - Stagecoach Station Manager (uncredited)
- Lucky Devils (1941) - Exposition Guard
- Road Show (1941) - Sheriff (uncredited)
- Mr. Dynamite (1941) - Cop (uncredited)
- Dutiful But Dumb (1941)
- Lady from Louisiana (1941) - Littlefield
- Wild Geese Calling (1941) - Mack
- The Iron Claw (1941, Serial) - Casey
- Bad Man of Deadwood (1941) - Store Owner (uncredited)
- Public Enemies (1941) - Detective
- Appointment for Love (1941) - Doorman (uncredited)
- Johnny Eager (1941) - Card Player (uncredited)
- Mr. District Attorney in the Carter Case (1941) - Conductor (uncredited)
- Bedtime Story (1941) - Conventioneer (uncredited)
- Pardon My Stripes (1942) - Jake (uncredited)
- A Tragedy at Midnight (1942) - Chubby Detective (uncredited)
- Yokel Boy (1942) - Sign Painter
- Butch Minds the Baby (1942) - Policeman (uncredited)
- To the Shores of Tripoli (1942) - Bartender (uncredited)
- Westward Ho (1942) - Stagecoach Agent (uncredited)
- In Old California (1942) - Red - Sacramento Bartender (uncredited)
- Lucky Legs (1942) - Pat
- Street of Chance (1942) - Bartender (uncredited)
- The Boogie Man Will Get You (1942) - Trooper Fred Quincy (uncredited)
- Boston Blackie Goes Hollywood (1942) - Al - Police Operator (uncredited)
- My Heart Belongs to Daddy (1942) - Policeman at Intersection (uncredited)
- Laugh Your Blues Away (1942) - Actor (uncredited)
- Let's Have Fun (1943) - (uncredited)
- Murder in Times Square (1943) - Policeman (uncredited)
