= Them Thar Hills =

1934 American short film by Charley Rogers

- Theatrical poster
- Directed by: Charley Rogers
- Written by: Stan Laurel; H.M. Walker
- Produced by: Hal Roach
- Starring: Stan Laurel; Oliver Hardy; Mae Busch; Charlie Hall; Billy Gilbert
- Cinematography: Art Lloyd
- Edited by: Bert Jordan
- Music by: Billy Hill (song "The Old Spinning Wheel"); Marvin Hatley; Leroy Shield
- Distributed by: Metro-Goldwyn-Mayer
- Release date: July 21, 1934
- Running time: 20:25
- Country: United States
- Language: English

Them Thar Hills is a 1934 American comedy short film directed by Charley Rogers and starring Stan Laurel and Oliver Hardy. The film was so well received by audiences that producer Hal Roach and Metro-Goldwyn-Mayer made a sequel, Tit for Tat, which was released five months later, in January 1935.

== Plot ==
Hardy's doctor, who is visiting to treat the gout in his right foot, informs him that gout is caused by "too much high living" and advises that he spend some time in the mountains, away from civilization, and drink lots of water. Laurel suggests that they rent a trailer to take into the mountains.

Meanwhile, a group of moonshiners in a shootout with the police dump barrels of their product into the well behind their cabin before the police can get to it, but are arrested before they can get rid of it all. On their drive in the mountains, Laurel spots the deserted cabin and they park in front of it. Seeing that the cabin is empty, they go in their trailer and decide to make dinner. Laurel draws water from the well to make coffee, and he soon notices that the water is discolored. Hardy attributes its color and unusual flavor to its richness in iron, and the two enjoy sips of it.

As the two make dinner alongside each other, Hardy sings to himself, and Laurel adds in his own melody between Hardy's pauses (to Hardy's annoyance). While cutting wood for the trailer's wood stove, Laurel accidentally cuts the tip off of Hardy's shoe. They resolve to place his foot inside a purse to prevent him from catching a cold until they fix his shoe after dinner.

Down the road, Mr. and Mrs. Hall are a couple whose car has run out of gas. By the time they happen upon the cabin and trailer, Laurel and Hardy are thoroughly drunk from the tainted water they've been drinking. The curmudgeonly Mr. Hall introduces himself and his wife to the pair, and asks to buy any gasoline they have to spare. Hardy lets him help himself, and Mrs. Hall asks them for some water to drink. She finds the water to be delicious, and after her husband refuses to try it, she decides to wait with Laurel and Hardy while Mr. Hall goes back to the car and picks her up so that she can spend some time eating and drinking with them.

By the time that Mr. Hall returns with the car, Mrs. Hall is drunk and loudly singing and laughing with Laurel and Hardy. Irritated by her drunken merriment, he kicks her out of the trailer and smacks Hardy in the face. Laurel uses the food and tools they have on hand to progressively make Mr. Hall look more ridiculous every time that he hurts Laurel or Hardy, making Hardy howl with laughter each time. After this humiliation, Mr. Hall leaves the trailer and unhitches it from the car, causing it to tip backwards. Laurel and Hardy crash through the back wall of the trailer and tumble to the ground, and when they get up, Hardy pours a can of molasses over him and then throws the down from a pillow onto him, covering him with feathers. Mr. Hall retaliates by coating the seat of his pants with gasoline and setting it on fire. Hardy rushes to the well and jumps in to douse the flames, but the fire reacts with the alcohol in the well water, causing an explosion that launches him into the air.

== Cast ==
- Stan Laurel as Stan
- Oliver Hardy as Ollie
- Mae Busch as Mrs. Hall
- "Charley" Hall as Mr. Hall

Uncredited

- Billy Gilbert as doctor
- Richard Alexander as moonshiner
- Bobby Dunn as moonshiner
- Sam Lufkin as moonshiner
- Eddie Baker as officer
- Bobby Burns as officer
- Baldwin Cooke as officer
