= The Water Nymph (1912 film) =

1912 film

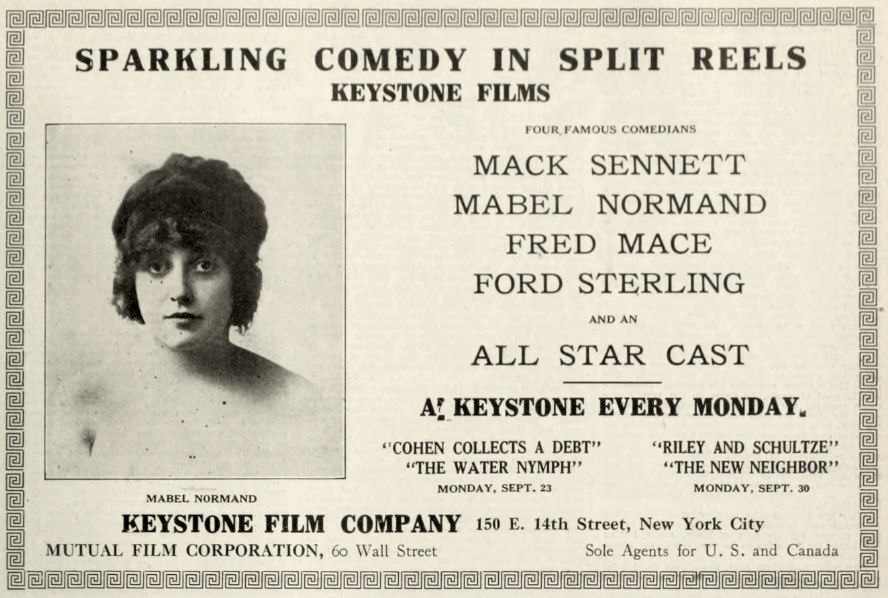
- Directed by: Mack Sennett
- Produced by: Mack Sennett
- Starring: Mabel Normand
- Production company: Keystone Studios
- Distributed by: Mutual Film
- Release date: September 23, 1912 (U.S.)
- Running time: 8 minutes
- Country: United States
- Language: Silent (English intertitles)

The full film

The Water Nymph (also known as The Beach Flirt) is a 1912 American silent comedy split-reel short film starring Mabel Normand and directed by Mack Sennett. Normand performed her own diving stunts for the film, which was the first comedy released by Keystone Studios.

The film precedes and may have directly inspired the Sennett Bathing Beauties, a publicity staple first introduced in 1915.

== Cast ==
- Mabel Normand as Diving Venus
- Mack Sennett as Mack
- Ford Sterling as Mack's father
- Gus Pixley
- Fred Mace
- Edward Dillon
- Mary Maxwell as Nymph
- Mae Busch (unconfirmed)

== Production ==
The Water Nymph was filmed on location in Venice, Los Angeles.
