= Mae Busch =

Australian-born American actress (1891–1946)

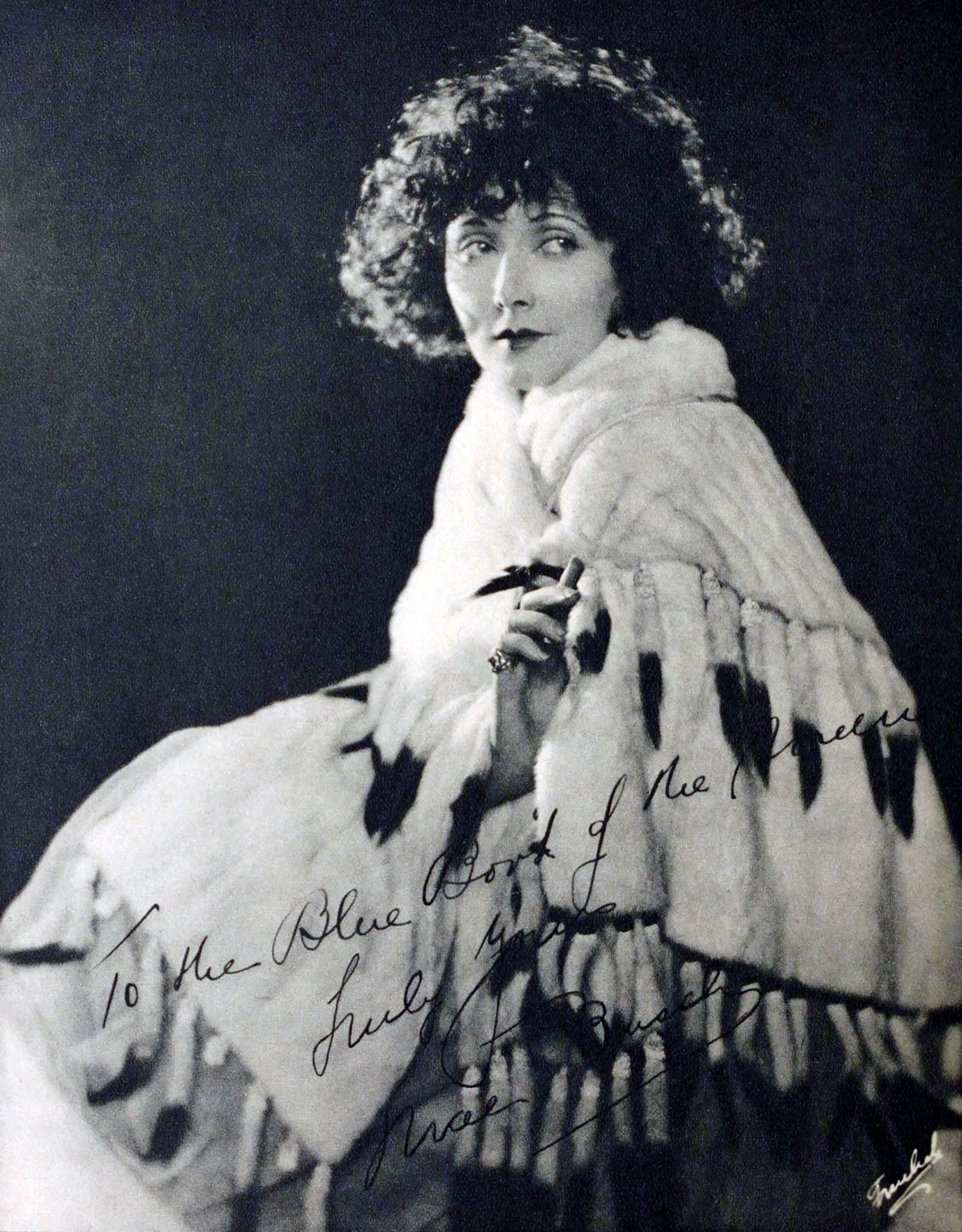
- Busch featured in The Blue Book of the Screen, 1923
- Born: Annie May Busch; 18 June 1891; Melbourne, Victoria, Australia
- Died: 20 April 1946 (aged 54); San Fernando Valley, California, U.S.
- Resting place: Chapel of the Pines Crematory
- Occupation: Actress
- Years active: 1912–1946
- Spouses: Francis McDonald (m. 1915; div. 1922) John Earl Cassell (m. 1926; div. 1929) Thomas C. Tate (m. 1936)

Mae Busch (born Annie May Busch; 18 June 1891 – 20 April 1946) was an Australian-born actress who worked in both silent and sound films in early Hollywood. In the latter part of her career she appeared in many Laurel and Hardy comedies, frequently playing Hardy's shrewish wife.

== Early life ==
Busch was born in Melbourne, Victoria to popular Australian vaudeville performers Elizabeth Maria Lay and Frederick William Busch. Her mother had been active since 1883 under the stage names Dora Devere and then Dora Busch; she toured India with Hudson's Surprise Party and toured New Zealand twice. They continued to tour with various companies with short breaks when their two children were born, Dorothy in 1889 (who lived for only four months) and Annie May in 1891. Following a concert tour of New Zealand, the family left for the United States via Tahiti. They departed on 8 August 1896 and arrived in San Francisco at the end of 1896 or in early 1897.

While her parents were touring the United States, six-year-old Annie May was placed in a convent school in New Jersey. At age 12, she joined her parents as the Busch Devere Trio, which was active from 1903 until 1912. As Mae Busch, she performed with her mother in Guy Fletch Bragdon's The Fixer to good reviews, and in 1911, they featured in Tom Reeves' Big Show Burlesque. Mae's big break came in March 1912 when she replaced Lillian Lorraine as the lead female in Over the River with Eddie Foy.

== Career ==
=== Silent film era ===
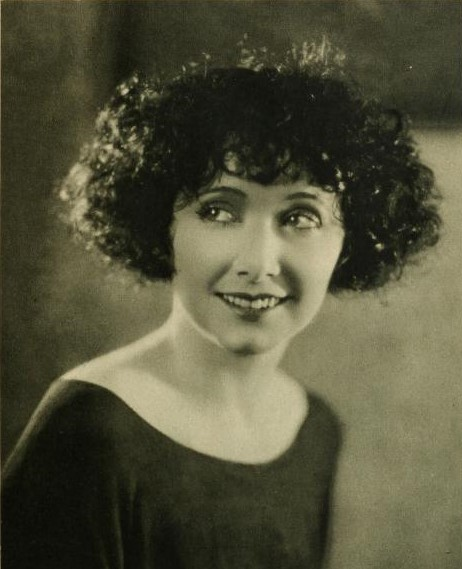
Busch in the film publication the Stars of the Photoplay, 1924

Mae's first film appearances are reputed to be in The Agitator and The Water Nymph, both released in 1912. There is some doubt about Mae's being in these films, as the production of both films in California appears to clash with Busch's commitments in New York. In 1915, she began working at Keystone Studios, where she appeared in comedy two-reelers. Her dalliance with studio chief Mack Sennett famously ended his engagement to actress Mabel Normand—who had actually been Busch's mentor and friend—when Normand walked in on the pair. According to an unverifiable claim by Minta Durfee, Busch, who was known for pinpoint throwing accuracy, inflicted a serious head injury on Normand by striking her with a vase.

At the pinnacle of her film career, Busch was known as the "versatile vamp". She starred in such feature films as The Devil's Pass Key (1920) and Foolish Wives (1922), both directed by Erich von Stroheim, and in The Unholy Three (1925), with Lon Chaney. She soon walked out on her contract at Metro–Goldwyn–Mayer and had a nervous breakdown. She regained her health and resumed working at both major and minor studios; her best opportunity was a starring role in Universal's 1927 drama Perch of the Devil, with Busch cast against type as a sympathetic young bride confronted by a rival. The film's climax was a spectacular flood sequence; this footage from Perch of the Devil was reused in later Universal productions for more than a decade.

=== Work with Laurel and Hardy ===
In 1926, producer Hal Roach began casting "name" dramatic stars in his short comedies: Priscilla Dean, Theda Bara, Herbert Rawlinson, Agnes Ayres, and Lionel Barrymore among them. Mae Busch joined Roach's "All Stars" for a leading role in Love 'em and Weep (1927), which began her long association with Laurel and Hardy. The short received good distribution and resulted in Busch resuming her feature-film career, including a return to MGM for the 1928 Lon Chaney feature While the City Sleeps.

In 1929, many stars of silent films faced an uncertain future, with their talents less in demand as talking pictures caught on. When a short-subject assignment came along, Busch grabbed it. It was again for the Hal Roach studio in the Laurel & Hardy comedy Unaccustomed as We Are (1929). It was the team's first "all-talking" comedy, and stage-trained Mae Busch handled her dialogue well as Hardy's put-upon wife. She appeared in 12 more Laurel and Hardy comedies, often displaying her versatility. She alternated between shrewish, gold-digging floozies (Chickens Come Home, Come Clean), Oliver Hardy's volatile wife (Sons of the Desert, Their First Mistake), and more sympathetic roles (Them Thar Hills, Tit for Tat, The Fixer Uppers). Her last role in a Laurel and Hardy film was in The Bohemian Girl, again as Hardy's combative spouse, released in 1936.

=== Later roles and legacy ===
The same year, she was featured in the low-budget serial The Clutching Hand, but it did not advance her career. From then, her film roles were often uncredited. Overall, she had roles in approximately 130 movies from 1912 to 1946. Jackie Gleason later mentioned her name on his TV show as "the ever-popular Mae Busch".

In 2014 The Grim Game, the believed-lost 1919 film that was the first feature to star Harry Houdini, was discovered and restored by Rick Schmidlin for Turner Classic Movies. Busch appears, credited as Bush.

== Personal life and death ==
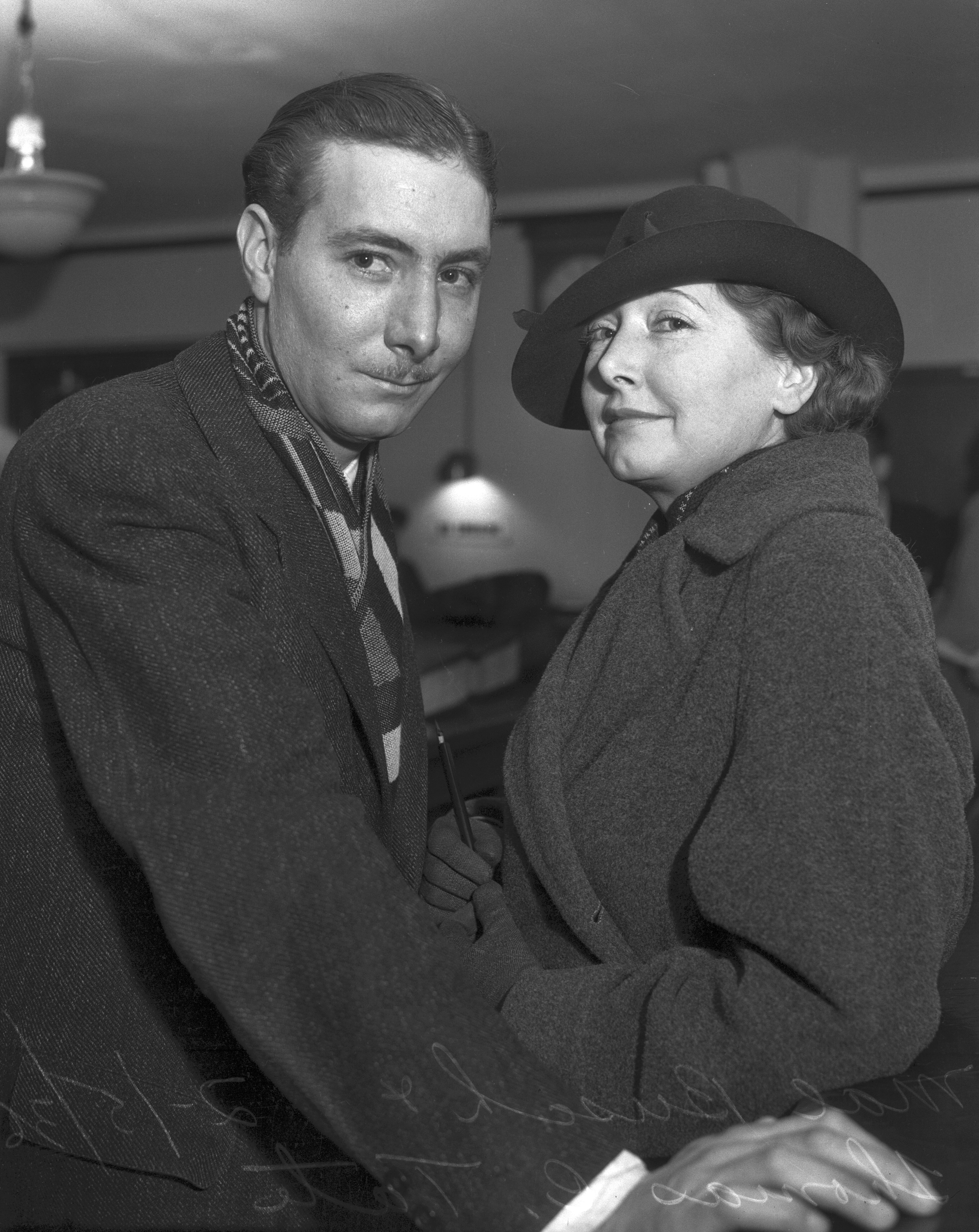
Busch and her third husband Thomas Tate

Busch was married three times: to actor Francis McDonald (1915–22), to John Earl Cassell (1926–29), and to civil engineer Thomas C. Tate (1936–her death).

Busch died on 20 April 1946 at age 54 at a San Fernando Valley sanitarium, where she had been ill for five months with colon cancer. (Note: The headline mistakenly listed her age as 44.)

For her contributions to the film industry, Busch was inducted into the Hollywood Walk of Fame in 1960 with a motion pictures star located at 7021 Hollywood Boulevard.

In the 1970s, it was discovered that her ashes had remained unclaimed and were in vaultage at Chapel of the Pines Crematory. The Way Out West Tent, a Los Angeles chapter of The Sons of the Desert, the Laurel and Hardy appreciation society, paid for their removal from vaultage and placement in a publicly accessible niche at Chapel of the Pines. The memorial plaque incorrectly lists her year of birth as 1901.

== Selected filmography ==
Year	Title	Role	Notes
1912	The Water Nymph	(uncredited?)	Short subject Alternative title: The Beach Flirt
1915	Mabel and Fatty's Married Life	(uncredited)	Short subject
1919	The Grim Game	Ethel Delmead	Credited as Mae Bush
1920	Her Husband's Friends	Clarice	
1920	The Devil's Pass Key	La Belle Odera	Lost film
1921	A Parisian Scandal	Mamselle Sari	Lost film
1922	Foolish Wives	Princess Vera Petchnikoff	
1922	Brothers Under the Skin	Flo Bulger	Incomplete
1922	Only a Shop Girl	Josie Jerome	Lost film
1923	Souls for Sale	Robina Teele	
1923	The Christian	Glory Quayle	
1924	Name the Man	Bessie Collister	
1924	Nellie, the Beautiful Cloak Model	Polly Joy	
1924	Bread	Jeanette Sturgis	Lost film
1924	Broken Barriers	Irene Kirby	Lost film
1924	Married Flirts	Jill Wetherell	Lost film
1924	The Triflers	Marjorie Stockton	
1925	The Unholy Three	Rosie O'Grady	
1925	Camille of the Barbary Coast	Camille	
1926	Fools of Fashion	Enid Alden	
1926	The Miracle of Life	Janet Howell	
1926	The Nutcracker	Martha Slipaway	
1927	Love 'em and Weep	Old flame	Short subject
1927	Husband Hunters	Marie Devere	
1927	Perch of the Devil	Ida Hook	
1927	Tongues of Scandal	Helen Hanby	
1928	While the City Sleeps	Bessie	
1929	Alibi	Daisy Thomas	
1929	Unaccustomed As We Are	Mrs. Hardy	Short subject
	A Man's Man	Violet	
1930	Young Desire	May Roberts	
1931	Chickens Come Home	Ollie's Old Time Flame	Short subject Uncredited
1931	Fly My Kite	Dan's new wife	Short subject
1931	Come Clean	Kate	Short subject
1932	Their First Mistake	Mrs. Arabella Hardy	Short subject
1932	Doctor X	Cathouse Madame	
1933	Blondie Johnson	Mae	
1933	Lilly Turner	Hazel	
1933	Cheating Blondes	Mrs. Jennie Carter	
1933	Sons of the Desert	Mrs. Lottie Hardy	Alternative title: Fraternally Yours
1933	Dance Girl Dance	Lou Kendall	
1934	Oliver the Eighth	Widow	Short subject Alternative title: The Private Life of Oliver the Eighth
1934	The Road to Ruin	Mrs. Monroe	Uncredited
1934	Going Bye-Bye!	Butch's girlfriend	Short subject
1934	Them Thar Hills	Mrs. Hall	Short subject
1934	The Live Ghost	Maisie the Vamp, Blonde Floozy	Short subject
1935	Tit for Tat	Mrs. Hall, Grocer's wife	
1935	The Fixer Uppers	Madame Pierre Gustave	Short subject
1936	The Bohemian Girl	Mrs. Hardy	
1936	The Amazing Exploits of the Clutching Hand	Mrs. Gironda	15-episode serial
1938	Daughter of Shanghai	Lil	Uncredited; Alternative title: Daughter of the Orient
1938	The Buccaneer	Bit Role	Uncredited
1938	Marie Antoinette	Madame La Motte	Uncredited
1940	Women Without Names	Rose	
1941	Ziegfeld Girl	Jenny	
1942	The Mad Monster	Susan	
1946	The Blue Dahlia	Jenny – Maid	Uncredited
1946	The Bride Wore Boots	Woman	Uncredited
1947	Ladies' Man	Woman in Automat	Uncredited
