= While the City Sleeps (1928 film) =

1928 film by Jack Conway

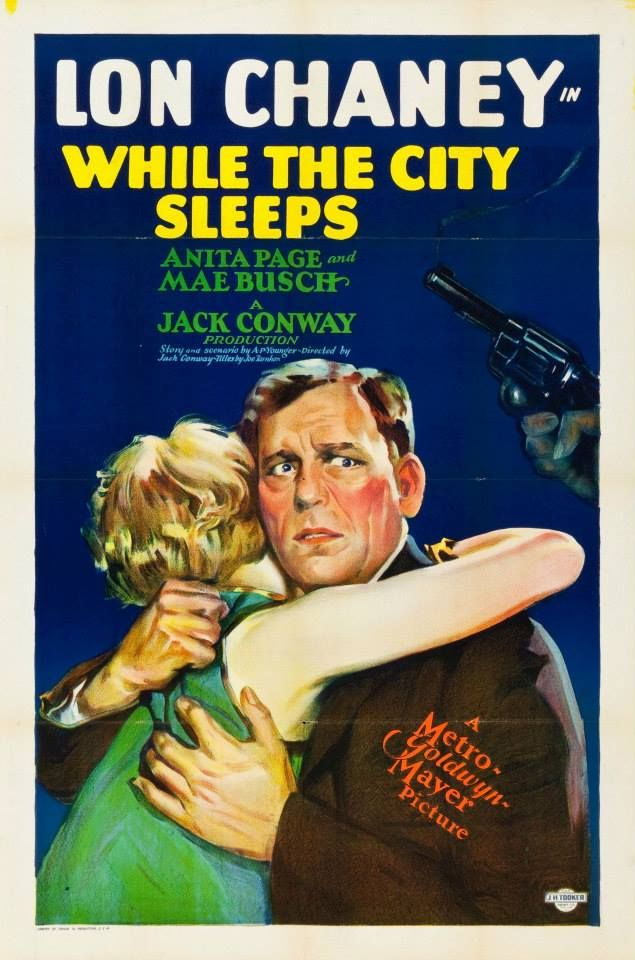
- Theatrical release poster
- Directed by: Jack Conway
- Written by: A.P. Younger; Joseph Farnham (titles)
- Starring: Lon Chaney; Anita Page; Carroll Nye; Wheeler Oakman; Mae Busch; Polly Moran; Angelo Rossito; Clinton Lyle
- Cinematography: Henry Sharp
- Edited by: Sam Zimbalist
- Distributed by: Metro-Goldwyn-Mayer Pictures
- Release date: September 15, 1928
- Running time: 70 minutes (original cut), 66 minutes (missing some scenes from reels 6 and 7)
- Country: United States
- Languages: Sound (Synchronized) (English Intertitles)

Lobby card

Full film

While the City Sleeps is a 1928 American synchronized sound crime drama film about a tough New York City police detective, played by Lon Chaney, out to catch a murdering gangster. While the film has no audible dialog, it was released with a synchronized musical score with sound effects using the sound-on-film Western Electric Sound System process. The film was directed by Jack Conway, written by Andrew Percival Younger, and co-starred Anita Page, Carroll Nye, Wheeler Oakman, and Mae Busch.

The sets were designed by Cedric Gibbons. Sam and Jack Feinberg (Chaney's set musicians) also played uncredited roles in the film; they can be seen playing in the band at Skeeter's nightclub, and also in the street scene where Mae Busch's body is found dead in her car. The movie was filmed on location in Los Angeles, and Lt. Roy Harlacher of the LAPD served as Chaney's technical advisor.

The film was originally to be called either Chinatown or Easy Money. The film was in production from April 12, 1928 to May 18, 1928, and cost $259,000 to produce. The worldwide box office gross was $1,035,000. A still exists showing Chaney in the role of Detective Dan Coghlan.

== Plot ==
The story begins with a focus on the Plain Clothes Men, an elite division of the New York police force. These detectives blend into the city in plain clothes, allowing them to infiltrate the underworld and make arrests with surgical precision. They are hated by criminals, especially for their clandestine meetings, where suspects are interrogated and analyzed in rotating shifts.

Among the force is Dan Coghlan, a hardened but weary Irish-American cop with flat feet and a cynical disposition. He's bored with routine and feeling aimless when he considers resigning. But just then, a murder case comes in: a well-known jeweler has been killed. Dan arrives at the scene and finds a familiar face — 'Mile-Away' Skeeter Carlson, a smooth-talking crook whose alibi is always the same: “I was a mile away.”

Skeeter, smug as ever, evades arrest once again due to lack of evidence. Dan, frustrated, begins tailing him. He tries to shake down Bessie, Skeeter’s hard-edged girlfriend, but she refuses to talk. Meanwhile, Dan notices that Myrtle Sullivan, a silly and starry-eyed flapper, is falling under Skeeter’s spell. He intervenes before Skeeter can fully seduce her, and gradually, Dan assigns himself as Myrtle’s protector.

Myrtle, who lives in a tenement with her mother Mrs. Sullivan, enjoys the thrill of hanging out with gangsters. She’s dating Marty, a small-time, clean-cut gangster who’s down on his luck and looking for purpose. Dan disapproves of the match, believing Marty to be no good. He tries to pull Myrtle away from the gangland lifestyle, but she stubbornly clings to her romantic illusions.

When Skeeter takes a trip out of town, Dan seizes the chance to break the case open. He convinces Bessie that Skeeter is planning to replace her with Myrtle. In a jealous rage, Bessie turns on him and admits Skeeter killed the jeweler. Dan prepares to make an arrest.

But Skeeter returns before the police can move. Bessie is found dead in her car, an apparent hit to silence her before she can testify. The case against Skeeter collapses in court. Outside the courtroom, Skeeter brazenly announces his plan to murder Marty, now considered a traitor.

Dan races to warn Marty, but when he finds him, Marty is mid-robbery at a fur warehouse. Though Dan could arrest him on the spot, he lets him go, offering instead a second chance—on the condition that Marty leave town and go straight. Marty agrees and writes a heartfelt letter to Myrtle asking for one last goodbye.

But Skeeter intercepts the letter and shows up in Myrtle’s apartment instead. He tries to force himself on her, but the police arrive just in time. Skeeter fires blindly through the door, killing a cop, and escapes in the chaos.

Knowing Myrtle will now testify against him, Skeeter sets out to kill her. Meanwhile, Dan, increasingly conflicted, confesses his love for Myrtle and asks her to marry him. Though she still loves Marty, Myrtle agrees out of gratitude.

Before the wedding can occur, Dan receives a tip. He tracks Skeeter and his gang to a hideout where they are preparing to flee. A shootout ensues — tear gas, flying bullets, dead men on both sides. Skeeter’s men surrender, but Skeeter flees to the rooftop. Dan pursues him in a tense, high-altitude chase. The two men exchange gunfire, and Dan finally kills Skeeter, ending his reign of terror.

Back at the boarding house, Marty returns, furious to learn of Myrtle’s engagement. He pleads with her to come with him, but she hesitates. In a quiet final moment, Dan watches the two, sees the truth in Myrtle’s eyes, and makes his choice. He tells Marty:

“Go marry that girl — but if you ever make her unhappy, I’ll break your neck.”

Myrtle and Marty leave together, hand in hand, to begin a new life, as Dan walks back into the city, alone but quietly at peace.

== Cast ==
- Lon Chaney as Daniel Aloysius 'Dan' Coghlan
- Anita Page as Myrtle Sullivan
- Carroll Nye as Marty
- Wheeler Oakman as 'Mile-Away' Skeeter Carlson
- Mae Busch as Bessie
- Polly Moran as Mrs. McGinnis
- Lydia Yeamans Titus as Mrs. Sullivan
- William Orlamond as Dwiggins
- Richard Carle as Wally
- Eddie Sturgis as Skeeter's Driver
- Clinton Lyle as Member of Criminal Gang
- Sydney Bracey as the cook
- Joseph W. Girard as Captain of Detectives
- Fred Kelsey as Detective in Shadow Box
- William H. O'Brien as Tenant
- L.J. O'Connor as Cop in Hall
- Angelo Rossito
- Eddie Kane
- Buddy Rae
- Scott Seaton as the D.A.

== Production ==
Trailer for While the City Sleeps

Chaney personally chose Anita Page as the leading lady, after seeing the rushes for Our Dancing Daughters (1928), in which she co-starred. By that time, Page was preparing for Bellamy Trial (1929), but she was reassigned to appear in While the City Sleeps. About working with Chaney, Page stated in a 2007 interview:

"Before filming began, Lon talked to me about make-up and explained the action scenes to me. Finally, he gave me one last bit of advice: ‘Never act purely on impulse in important matters,’ he said. ‘Think things over carefully. Then, when you’re sure that you’re right, go ahead. And don’t let anything swerve you from that decision.’"

Los Angeles City Hall, which opened in April 1928, appears on film for perhaps the first time in the background of a few rooftop scenes, especially in the climactic rooftop gun battle.

== Critical Comments ==
"Now and then Lon Chaney tosses his make-up kit over the fence and acts like a human being. He appears "as is" in this picture, which shows crook stuff at its highest tempo, dwarfing THE BIG CITY to the size of a newsreel, and proving that an occasional straight role is fine balance for big character actors. He gives a remarkable characterization of a tough dick. A well-knit story, exceptionally cast and directed." ---Photoplay

"I may have mentioned in this space that I have always considered TELL IT TO THE MARINES Lon Chaney's best picture. This for the reason that in it Chaney didn't make up. Whether I've mentioned it or not, the opinion is now revised. I consider WHILE THE CITY SLEEPS Chaney's best picture. After all, he did have a marine uniform in the other picture. In this he works straight as to attire as well as character. He's a detective, a big city detective, and I think it's well nigh time somebody did a detective without making him funny. Chaney does so." ---Exhibitors Herald

"To begin with, Lon Chaney doesn't do at all in a semi-heroic role. You can't disassociate him from something monstrous and all the bizarre characters he has ever played come up to confront the spectator. Good judgement ought to have barred Chaney from the role in the first place. Therefore, a misplaced star turns what might have been a stirring meller into second grade quality program output, wholly dependent on Chaney's name." ---Variety

"Though this is an underworld drama, the theme is exactly the same as that of Laugh, Clown, Laugh. And Lon Chaney is again the somewhat dilapidated looking would-be lover who laughs while his heart is breaking. Very exciting but I think Lon Chaney should pick on girls nearer his own age." ---Motion Picture Magazine

== Tag Lines ==
"You've seen Chaney as a crook Now you see him as a master detective in one of his most exciting performances!" --- (Print Ad-Provo Sunday Herald, ((Provo, Utah)) 11/11/28)

"CHANEY, as a detective, single-handed, corners the city's most dangerous "mob" in their hide-away- and then finds he has bitten off more than he can chew!" --- (Print Ad- Dodge City Daily Globe, ((Dodge City, Ks.)) 21 January 1929)

"Detectives, the underworld, thrills and a glorious romance. The real inside story of how New York plain clothes men battle the forces of crime day and night." --- (Print Ad- Watkins Express, ((Watkins Glen, NY)) 13 December 1928)

== Survival status ==
The film was released as a sound film with sound effects and a musical score. All of the extant prints of While the City Sleeps are missing portions from reels 6 and 7, and nitrate decomposition has affected some portions of the surviving reels. but this does not significantly affect the storyline. The existing print is mute and was made to be synchronized with Vitaphone type (sound-on-disc) soundtrack discs. Sound-on-film prints no longer exist.

== See also ==
- List of early sound feature films (1926–1929)
