= Block-Heads =

1938 film by John G. Blystone

- Theatrical release poster
- Directed by: John G. Blystone
- Written by: Felix Adler; Charley Rogers; James Parrott; Harry Langdon; Arnold Belgard
- Produced by: Hal Roach Jr. Hal Roach
- Starring: Stan Laurel; Oliver Hardy; Patricia Ellis; Minna Gombell; Billy Gilbert; James Finlayson
- Cinematography: Art Lloyd
- Edited by: Bert Jordan
- Music by: Marvin Hatley
- Production company: Hal Roach Studios
- Distributed by: Metro-Goldwyn-Mayer
- Release date: August 19, 1938
- Running time: 58 minutes
- Country: United States
- Language: English

Block-Heads is a 1938 American comedy film directed by John G. Blystone and starring Stan Laurel and Oliver Hardy. It was produced by Hal Roach Studios for Metro-Goldwyn-Mayer release. The film, including elements from the Laurel and Hardy shorts We Faw Down (1928) and Unaccustomed As We Are (1929), was Roach's final film for MGM. Roach wanted to dispose of this contractual obligation quickly, so the film doesn't bother with a strong storyline or elaborate production, and instead uses a string of comic situations and visual gags.

== Plot ==
In the trenches of World War I, Pvt. Laurel, Pvt. Hardy, and their fellow soldiers prepare for combat. However, Stan is relegated to trench duty while his comrades proceed into battle. Subsequently, the film fast-forwards to 1938, revealing Stan still at his post, as shown by the accumulation of empty cans of beans and the well-worn path of his patrol. His accidental discovery prompts a hero's welcome upon his return home, where he reunites with Ollie, who is now married.

Upon visiting Stan at the Soldiers' Home, Ollie jumps to a wrong conclusion about Stan's physical condition. The duo embarks on a tumultuous journey to Ollie's apartment, encountering various obstacles and engaging in heated exchanges along the way. Domestic chaos ensues upon their arrival, exacerbated by Stan's inadvertent destruction of Ollie's property and an awkward encounter with the neighbors, Mr. and Mrs. Gilbert. At the height of the hectic confusion, Mrs. Gilbert is trapped in Ollie's apartment, and tensions escalate with the arrival of Mrs. Hardy and Mr Gilbert. The narrative culminates in Stan and Ollie scrambling for safety, with the shotgun-wielding husband in hot pursuit.

== Cast ==
- Stan Laurel as Stan
- Oliver Hardy as Ollie
- Patricia Ellis as Mrs. Gilbert
- Minna Gombell as Mrs. Hardy
- Billy Gilbert as Mr. Gilbert
- James Finlayson as Finn (man on stairs)
- Patsy Moran as Lulu
- James C. Morton as James (porter)
- Karl Slover as Midget
- Chill Wills as Midget (voice)
- Harry Woods as Irate neighbor
- Tommy Bond as Neighbor's son
- Jean Del Val as French aviator
- Harry Strang as Desk clerk
- Mike Behegan as Bugler
- Ed Brandenburg as Pedestrian

== Production ==
- The film was announced as being the last Laurel & Hardy film and it was the last Hal Roach production for Metro-Goldwyn-Mayer.
- Block-Heads was the last film directed by John G. Blystone, who died shortly after filming.
- The battle scenes at the beginning of the film are taken from the 1925 silent film The Big Parade, also an MGM release.
- The final scene has the outraged Billy Gilbert carrying a shotgun and taking aim at Laurel and Hardy. The original fade-out, as scripted, had Gilbert seated comfortably in his study, with Stan and Ollie's heads mounted on his trophy wall (Ollie glances at Stan and says, "Well, here's another nice mess you've gotten me into!"). Hal Roach vetoed the idea as "too gruesome", but writer Felix Adler later used the gag at the end of The Three Stooges' 1941 short I'll Never Heil Again. Stan Laurel was no longer on the studio lot when it came time to film a replacement ending for Block-Heads, so in the final scene "Stan and Ollie" (their stunt doubles Ham Kinsey and Cy Slocum) are seen running away from Billy Gilbert, and they continue their escape outdoors, retreating from Gilbert with their backs to the camera.

== Reception ==
Block-Heads had no plot to speak of -- just an hour of gags and situations -- and critical reaction in the trade review was mixed: some found Block-Heads enjoyable and others found it mediocre. Boxoffice led the cheers: "Infinitely better than their last effort (Swiss Miss), Laurel and Hardy turn in a job which should be a field day for their fans and at the same time deliver value received in abdominal guffaws for all customers. The past masters of slapstick return to the tried and true tricks in which they formerly specialized and, additionally, give out with a fair measure of bright, new gags." Film Daily agreed: "Those who like the Laurel and Hardy type of slapstick comedy will find this 55 minutes [sic] of enjoyable fun. The boys have made two-reelers like it, but this offering has a greater number of gags. As a pleasant piece of diversion on the program, it should take care of its spot nicely."

Among the naysayers was Robert Joseph of the Hollywood Spectator, who liked Laurel and Hardy but despaired of the absence of a storyline. "[The five writers'] combined efforts to infuse a little comedy in a lot of chatter and some bad, stale gags went a little sour. I am a Laurel and Hardy fan, and I have a lot of fun when I see one of their shorts, but it seems that Hal Roach should have learned that you cannot stretch a two-reel comedy into 10 reels [sic] of feature without something thinning out somewhere. There is no plot, of course." Columnist R. W. Dana of the New York Herald Tribune noted that the jokes were familiar and "Laurel and Hardy, as a comedy team, are becoming inevitably gray. Block-Heads is a laugh parade, with reservations."

Variety, oddly enough, was itself split, publishing reviews from different correspondents. The New York office thought "Block-Heads is an awful letdown for [Laurel and Hardy]. Its audience value is negligible. The picture is one of those shorties the exhibitors have been complaining about, but although it runs 58 minutes, it's still a lot of taffy stretched to the breaking point." The Hollywood bureau differed: "For those who like the Laurel and Hardy brand of hearty comedy, Block-Heads will be a refreshing dish. Slapstick team are more nearly in their old top form than they have been in some of their more recent offerings. The gags are for the most part new and novel, and click the laughs in a steady barrage."

Contemporary response has been much more favorable. Leonard Maltin was enthusiastic: "Stan's been marching in a trench for 20 years—nobody told him WW 1 was over! Ollie brings him home to find he hasn't changed. Top L&H." Leslie Halliwell gave it three of four stars: "The last first-class Laurel and Hardy comedy is shapeless but hilarious, a fragmented reworking of earlier ideas, all of which work beautifully. Gags include encounters with a tip-up truck and an automatic garage, and a brilliantly worked out sequence up and down several flights of stairs."

== Recognition ==
The film's musical score, composed by Marvin Hatley, earned a nomination for an Academy Award for Best Music (Scoring).
