= The Fixer Uppers =

- Directed by: Charles Rogers
- Written by: Stan Laurel; Frank Tashlin
- Produced by: Hal Roach
- Starring: Stan Laurel; Oliver Hardy; Mae Busch; Charles B. Middleton; Arthur Housman
- Cinematography: Art Lloyd
- Edited by: Bert Jordan
- Music by: Leroy Shield
- Production company: Hal Roach Studios, Inc.
- Distributed by: Metro-Goldwyn-Mayer
- Release date: February 9, 1935
- Running time: 20:25
- Country: United States
- Language: English

The Fixer Uppers is a 1935 American short comedy film directed by Charles Rogers, starring Laurel and Hardy, and produced by Hal Roach.

== Plot ==
Christmas card purveyors Stan and Ollie find themselves embroiled in a scheme orchestrated by a discontented wife, aimed at igniting jealousy in her passionless marriage. However, their well-intentioned endeavor takes a perilous turn when the husband, a volatile artist, becomes excessively agitated, ultimately challenging Ollie to a midnight duel, fraught with mortal implications, in a fit of jealousy.

Navigating the predicament with characteristic ineptitude, Stan and Ollie seek refuge in a nearby tavern, where they deliberate their predicament. Realizing the husband's ignorance of their residence, Ollie imprudently notifies him of his absence and exchanges insults, precipitating further complications. Succumbing to inebriation alongside a neighbor, they attract police attention, resulting in their apprehension and subsequent deposition in the couple's apartment, where they are discovered inebriated and prone.

As tensions escalate, firearms are brandished, yet the wife intervenes, revealing the substitution of lethal ammunition with harmless blanks. Despite this reprieve, Ollie feigns mortality when confronted with a simulated gunshot, enabling their escape amidst a chaotic pursuit. The duo evading their adversary's pursuit, culminating in Ollie's resigned resignation from the vantage point of a horse-drawn refuse conveyance, having sought refuge within a refuse receptacle.

== Cast ==
- Stan Laurel as Stan
- Oliver Hardy as Oliver
- Mae Busch as Madame Gustave
- Charles Middleton as Pierre Gustave
- Arthur Housman as the drunk man
- Noah Young as the bartender

== Production ==
The penultimate Laurel and Hardy short comedy made at Hal Roach Studios, the film is a reworking of Slipping Wives (1927) a silent comedy the comedians appeared in before they teamed up.

The Fixer Uppers was partially remade by The Three Stooges in 1940 as Boobs in Arms.
