= Unaccustomed As We Are =

1929 short film by Lewis R. Foster

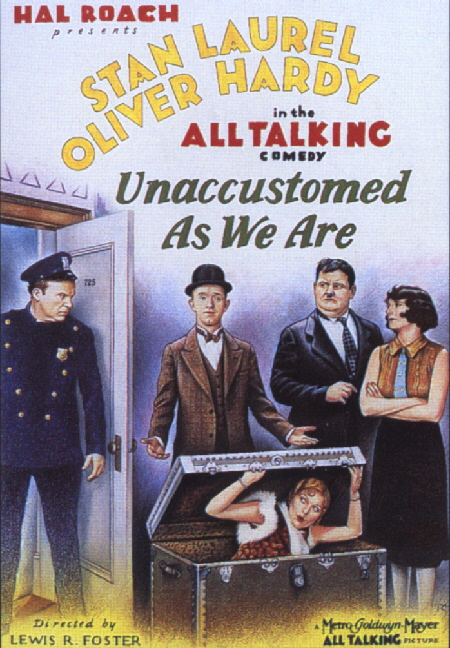
- Theatrical poster
- Directed by: Lewis R. Foster; Hal Roach
- Written by: Leo McCarey (story); H. M. Walker
- Produced by: Hal Roach
- Starring: Stan Laurel; Oliver Hardy; Edgar Kennedy; Mae Busch; Thelma Todd
- Cinematography: John MacBurnie; Len Powers; Jack Roach; George Stevens
- Edited by: Richard C. Currier
- Distributed by: Metro-Goldwyn-Mayer
- Release date: May 4, 1929
- Running time: 18:00 (silent); 20:53 (sound)
- Country: United States
- Languages: English; Silent with English intertitles

Unaccustomed As We Are is the first sound film comedy starring Stan Laurel and Oliver Hardy, released on May 4, 1929. It was produced by Hal Roach and directed by Lewis R. Foster.

The title, Unaccustomed As We Are..., was a spoofing reference to the fact that its two stars had never before spoken audibly in their films. And in point of fact, although it was a film with dialogue, the soundtrack mostly carried music, and sound effects, with dialogue a long way third.

In case the Talkies did not prove popular, and in order to be released in theatres which had not yet been converted for sound, Hal Roach hedged his bets by releasing it in both the new All-Talking format and in Silent format (in the latter case, with intertitles carrying the dialogue). As with the Laurel and Hardy silent films, visual gags remained the heart and soul of the picture: the characters were certainly talking, but the comedy was not yet in the dialogue, the film still relied entirely on sight-gags for its laughs.

The film entered the public domain in the United States on January 1, 2025.

== Plot ==
Unaccustomed as We Are (1929)

Ollie extends a cordial invitation to Stan for dinner, tempting him with promises of a sumptuous feast comprising steak, mushroom sauce, strawberries, whipped cream, coffee, and a cigar. Stan, however, remains characteristically cautious, inquiring about the inclusion of nuts in the meal.

Upon their arrival, they encounter Mrs. Hardy, whose reception of the unexpected guests is less than warm, prompting her abrupt departure in a state of irritation. Neighbor Mrs. Kennedy offers assistance with dinner preparations, inadvertently leading to a mishap that sets her dress ablaze. To conceal Mrs. Kennedy's predicament, Stan and Ollie hastily stow her in a trunk.

Subsequently, Mrs. Hardy extends an olive branch to Oliver, bearing nuts as a peace offering for Stan. However, tensions escalate when Oliver announces his intent to depart for South America, culminating in a heated exchange between husband and wife. The commotion draws the attention of Mr. Kennedy, a police officer, who becomes embroiled in the domestic dispute.

Amidst the chaos, Mr. Kennedy inadvertently assumes another woman must be in the trunk. Employing a subtle approach, he orchestrates a scheme to diffuse the conflict, instructing the boys to transport the trunk to his apartment. Meanwhile, within the Kennedys' abode, a tempestuous confrontation unfolds between the spouses, underscored by Mrs. Kennedy's righteous indignation.

As the tumult subsides, a battered Mr. Kennedy emerges and, in a fit of retribution, subjects Ollie to physical reprimand. However, his intentions to similarly chastise Stan are interrupted by his wife's intervention, wielding a formidable vase to administer her own form of justice. Meanwhile, Stan, seemingly unfazed, departs nonchalantly, only to meet an ignominious fate as he inadvertently tumbles down a flight of stairs, leaving Ollie to wince in sympathetic discomfort.

== Cast ==
- Stan Laurel as Stan
- Oliver Hardy as Ollie
- Edgar Kennedy as Officer Kennedy
- Mae Busch as Mrs. Hardy
- Thelma Todd as Mrs. Kennedy

== Production notes ==
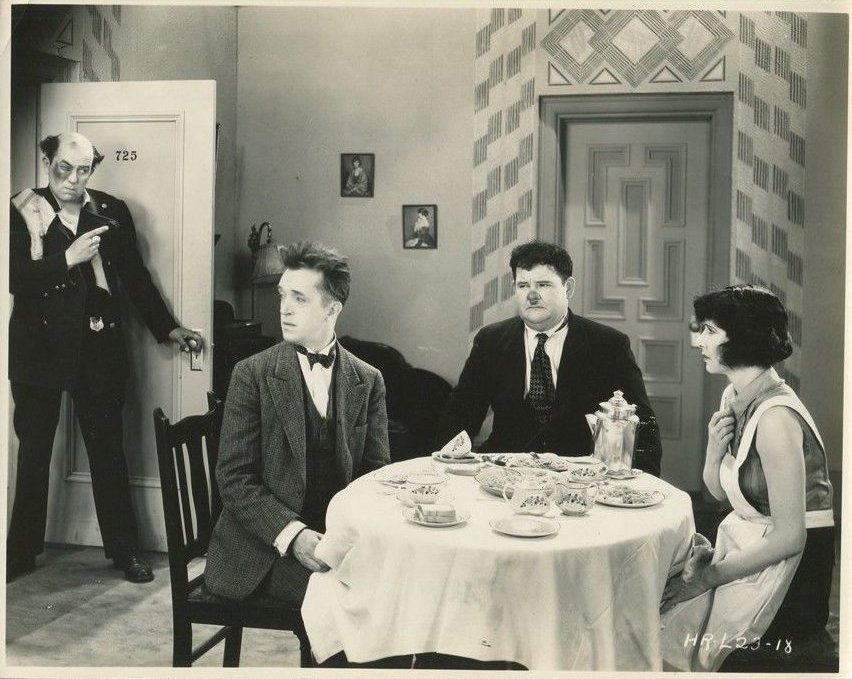
Left to right: Edgar Kennedy, Stan Laurel, Oliver Hardy and Mae Busch

Unaccustomed As We Are is notable for being Laurel and Hardy's first sound film as well as the first all-talkie short film by Hal Roach (the title was drawn from the popular cliché "Unaccustomed as I am to public speaking..."). The soundtrack was lost for 50 years until it was traced on disc in the late 1970s. A silent version, with intertitles, was also released, as well as a Victor disc International Sound Version (featuring a synchronized music score and sound effects). This picture was the first "all-talking" Laurel and Hardy comedy. The working title was Their Last Word.

This is the first film in which Hardy says to Laurel, "Why don't you do something to help me!" which became a catchphrase, repeated in numerous subsequent films. It also introduced Stan's distinctive, high-pitched whimper of distress.

The plot of Unaccustomed As We Are was expanded into the feature film Block-Heads in 1938. In addition, the gag of the spaghetti landing on Ollie's lap was originally conceived for their 1928 silent film Habeas Corpus, but was left unfilmed.

Edgar Kennedy appeared in numerous Laurel and Hardy films, almost always playing a cop or other authority figure, and when named on-screen, his character almost invariably, as here, used his real name.

The new talking-picture technology was so unfamiliar at the Roach studio that Unaccustomed as We Are became a training exercise for its technical staff. Four cameramen alternated on the photography. The film was also released in a silent version, to accommodate those theaters that had not yet converted to sound. Unaccustomed as We Are was an experiment in sound, and most of the action was driven by dialogue. The silent version used printed title cards to display the dialogue whenever anyone spoke, resulting in a slow and sometimes tedious narrative. Later Laurel and Hardy hybrids, intended for both silent and sound markets, were careful to include pantomime and visual gags, so silent-film audiences could enjoy the action without hearing the dialogue. The opening song of the movie is a dubbed version of the song "Liberty", which was heard in the 1929 film Liberty.
