= Tit for Tat (1935 film) =

1935 American short film by Charley Rogers

- Directed by: Charles Rogers
- Written by: Stan Laurel; Frank Tashlin
- Produced by: Hal Roach
- Starring: Stan Laurel; Oliver Hardy
- Cinematography: Art Lloyd
- Edited by: Bert Jordan
- Music by: Leroy Shield
- Distributed by: Metro-Goldwyn-Mayer
- Release date: January 5, 1935
- Running time: 19:25
- Country: United States
- Language: English

Tit for Tat is a 1935 short comedy film starring Stan Laurel and Oliver Hardy. It is the only direct sequel they made, following the story of Them Thar Hills, which was released the previous year and includes the same two supporting characters, Mr. and Mrs. Hall, portrayed by Charlie Hall and Mae Busch. This "two-reeler" is notable too for being nominated for an Academy Award as Best Live Action Short Film (Comedy) of 1935, although it did not win. It also has a central theme similar to the comedy duo's 1929 silent short Big Business. In the opening scene of Tit for Tat, Oliver places a sign in the front window of his and Stan's electrical store. It reads "Open for Big Business", an allusion to the escalating revenge and "reciprocal destruction" common to both films.

== Plot ==
Having just opened their new electrical supplies store, Laurel and Hardy go to the grocery store next door to introduce themselves to the owner, Mr. Hall. Hall and his wife recognize them from an incident where they met in the mountains (Them Thar Hills). His wife is excited to see them again, but he is not. Hall warns them to stay away from his store. When they get back from the store, a shoplifter cheerily greets them as he leaves the store carrying a stolen item.

Back at their storefront, while Hardy is using a ladder to install lightbulbs into their store's sign, Laurel activates an elevator beneath the ladder, vaulting Hardy over to the windowsill of the upper floor of Hall's building. Mrs. Hall chances upon him and pulls him inside to safety. Hall, having missed all the commotion, suspects Hardy of flirting with his wife as he sees them laughing together and descending the stairwell into the store proper. Hall confronts Hardy and threatens to beat him up if he doesn't leave his wife alone. Hardy, thoroughly offended, resolves to protect his "character" by demanding an apology from Hall (as the same shoplifter leaves their store with two more stolen items).

Hall, when confronted, strikes Hardy on the head with a wooden spoon. Hardy retaliates by opening the cash register's drawer into Hall's chin. When they leave, they each take a marshmallow from a box in the front to eat (which Laurel had surreptitiously done earlier) as a taunt, but Hall intimidates Laurel before he can eat his.

A feud ensues for the rest of the film, where each party goes to the other's store and uses that store's items to either attack each other or destroy other merchandise. The shoplifter also frequently returns whenever Laurel and Hardy aren't at their store, stealing more and more appliances each time. When the feud reaches its climax, Hall smashes a light hanging in Laurel and Hardy's store, causing each light to crash into the next until one is launched out of the storefront window, attracting the attention of townsfolk and a policeman.

The policeman follows Laurel and Hardy into Hall's store and watch as they continue to harass each other. In the audience of the policeman, Mrs. Hall, and bystanders, Hardy has the chance to explain the story behind the feud. The policeman orders Hall to apologize to Hardy. Hall finally apologizes under threat of arrest, and Laurel and Hardy return to their store, where they see that the shoplifter has completely cleared their store into a moving truck.

== Cast ==
- Stan Laurel as Stan
- Oliver Hardy as Ollie
- Mae Busch as Mrs. Hall
- Charley Hall as Mr. Hall, the grocer

Uncredited:

- Bobby Dunn as shoplifter
- Baldwin Cooke as customer
- James C. Morton as policeman
- Jack Hill as passerby
- Viola Richard as passerby

== Reception ==
The short was popular with audiences in 1935 and was generally well received by critics and theater owners. Variety, the entertainment industry's leading trade paper at the time, gives the film high marks in its March 27 issue. In its review of Tit for Tat, the paper also alludes to news reports that Laurel and Hardy's partnership had recently ended due to Stan's recurring disputes with producer Hal Roach:

Newest L&H short, and perhaps the last, since they split recently, is another topnotch two-reeler with a sufficiency of laughs and novel situation accompaniment...Stan and Oliver are in the electric business...One bit neatly worked up is a man walking in and out of the electric store and walking out with increasingly large bundles. The fat boy and his thin partner are too busy fighting with their neighbor to bother with him and for a tag finish the crook comes up in a truck to clean out what little is left.

The Film Daily, another widely read trade publication in 1935, was impressed by all the "Grand Laughs" in Tit for Tat. In its March 23 review, the paper welcomes what it views as the comedy duo's return to broad physical comedy and, like Variety, draws special attention to the shoplifter's role in the film:

This Laurel and Hardy funfest gets back to the good old slapstick technique of their earlier pictures, and is one of their best...A very funny running gag has a stranger entering their store and walking out with valuable electric appliances for the home. Each time the partners return to the store they encounter the thief, but are so occupied with their row with the grocer that the pay no attention to him....

Motion Picture Herald, yet another influential trade publication in 1935, gives the film a somewhat restrained, clinical assessment in its March 10 issue, describing the short as a "Good Comedy" with "numerous laugh-provoking situations". In addition to providing reviews and news about the film industry, Motion Picture Herald regularly published the reactions of theater owners or "exhibitors" to the features and shorts they presented. Their reactions to Tit for Tat were mixed, although most were very positive. "A lot of laughs", reports Roy Irvine, owner of the Ritz Theatre in Ritzville, Washington, while H. G. Stettmund of the H. and S. Theatre in Chandler, Oklahoma, describes it "the best these boys have made for a long time." Some theater owners, however, considered the film to be a mediocre production and only a modest box-office draw. C. L. Niles, the owner of Niles Theatre in Anamosa, Iowa, was not impressed with the short. In the April 20 issue of Motion Picture Herald, he grades it "Just fair" and remarks that his theater simply "got by" in screening it, suggesting that the film, as least in Anamosa, had not been very successful in boosting ticket sales. In Eminence, Kentucky, the owner of that town's cinema, A. N. Miles, found it to be a decidedly weak comedy. "Not a good laugh in the whole two reels", he complains in the July 13 issue of Motion Picture Herald.
