= Chickens Come Home =

1931 film

- UK title card
- Directed by: James W. Horne
- Written by: Hal Roach (story); H.M. Walker (dialogue)
- Produced by: Hal Roach
- Starring: Stan Laurel; Oliver Hardy
- Cinematography: Jack Stevens; Art Lloyd
- Edited by: Richard C. Currier
- Music by: Marvin Hatley; Leroy Shield
- Production company: Hal Roach Studios
- Distributed by: Metro-Goldwyn-Mayer
- Release date: February 11, 1931
- Running time: 29:48 (English); 53:59 (Spanish)
- Country: United States
- Language: English

Chickens Come Home is a 1931 American pre-Code short film starring Laurel and Hardy, directed by James W. Horne and produced by Hal Roach. It was shot in January 1931 and released on February 21, 1931. It is a remake of the 1927 silent film Love 'em and Weep in which James Finlayson plays Hardy's role and Hardy plays a party guest.

== Plot ==
Stan Laurel and Oliver Hardy assume the roles of proprietors in the fertilizer trade, as indicated by the inscription on their office door. Ollie, seated at his desk, orchestrates affairs with the demeanor of a commanding executive, while his colleague, Stan, is summoned from the "sampler room," reflecting their professional responsibilities. An interaction ensues where Ollie, harboring political ambitions, dictates a mayoral acceptance speech to Laurel, underscoring his aspirations for civic leadership.

Things take a dramatic turn when Ollie is confronted in his office by a former flame, portrayed by Mae Busch, who threatens to disclose an incriminating photograph unless financially compensated. Subsequent events unfold with comedic intricacy, as Ollie maneuvers to conceal the woman from his wife who arrives to remind him of their impending dinner party. A fur coat, belonging to the blackmailer, becomes a central object of deception, with Ollie fabricating an explanation to deflect suspicion.

Facing the dilemma of honoring both social obligations and the demands of the blackmailer, Ollie enlists Stan's aid in a precarious scheme. Stan's visit to the blackmailer's apartment triggers a series of misunderstandings, culminating in a cascade of suspicions and comedic misinterpretations among the various characters. The narrative escalates with the blackmailer's unexpected appearance at Ollie's residence during the dinner party, where Ollie resorts to audacious subterfuge to avert exposure. As tensions mount and farcical circumstances unfold, the narrative reaches its climax when the real Mrs. Laurel arrives, brandishing a hatchet, and Stan, overcome with trepidation, makes a hasty retreat.

== Cast ==
Table of cast members
Name	Role
Stan Laurel	as Mr. Stan Laurel
Oliver Hardy	as Mr. Oliver Hardy
Uncredited
Mae Busch	as Ollie's old flame
Baldwin Cooke	as office worker
Gordon Douglas	as passerby outside apartment
Norma Drew	as Mrs. Laurel
James Finlayson	as butler
Elizabeth Forrester	as passerby outside apartment
Charles K. French	as Judge
Clara Guiol	as secretary
Frank Holliday	as Mr. Holliday
Ham Kinsey	as Mr. Kinsey
Dorothy Layton	as office worker
Venice Lloyd	as office worker
Patsy O'Byrne	as busybody lady
Gertrude Pedlar	as Judge's wife
Frank Rice	as the Hardys' servant
Thelma Todd	as Mrs. Hardy

== Spanish version ==
A Spanish-language version of this film was completely re-shot with the stars delivering their lines in phonetic Spanish. It was expanded to one hour by adding scenes of magician Abraham J. Cantu and vaudeville regurgitator Hadji Ali performing at the Hardy dinner party. Titled Politiquerias, the film was released in Latin American and Spanish markets as a feature.

Joining headliners Laurel and Hardy in this version is a supporting cast of native Spanish speakers: Linda Loredo portrays Mrs. Hardy, Carmen Granada is Mrs. Laurel, and Rina De Liguoro is in the Mae Busch role as Oliver's old girlfriend. James Finlayson, however, reprises his role as the Hardy butler and still absorbs the abuse—and even more—from the magician and the regurgitator in the added scenes.
