= Love 'em and Weep =

1927 film

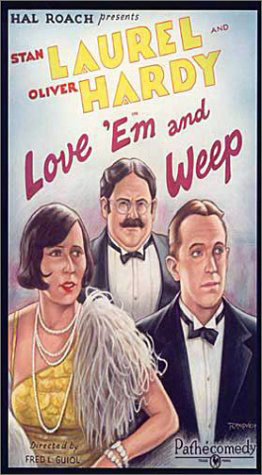
- Directed by: Fred Guiol
- Written by: Hal Roach; H.M. Walker (titles)
- Produced by: Hal Roach
- Starring: Mae Busch; Stan Laurel; James Finlayson
- Cinematography: Floyd Jackman
- Edited by: Richard C. Currier
- Distributed by: Pathé Exchange
- Release date: June 12, 1927
- Running time: 21:28
- Country: United States
- Languages: Silent film English (Original intertitles)

Love 'em and Weep (1927)

Love 'em and Weep is a 1927 American silent comedy short film starring Mae Busch, Stan Laurel and James Finlayson, with Oliver Hardy featured in a small role. This is Mae Busch's first of fifteen appearances with Stan Laurel and Oliver Hardy.

== Plot ==
An old flame of businessman Titus Tillsbury threatens to expose their past, destroying both his marriage and career. He sends his aide to keep her away from a dinner party he and his wife are hosting that evening. Romaine fails to do this, but temporarily smooths things by pretending Peaches is his wife. An incriminating photograph is disposed of, although Titus must painfully remove pieces of the glass frame from his posterior.

Titus threatens to shoot himself if Peaches doesn't leave; causing her to faint. This leads to the first showing of a classic Laurel & Hardy routine called "Bent Double". Two people standing on each other's shoulders while dressed as a woman, being "escorted home" by Titus. The deception proves difficult due to repeated pratfalls on a highly polished marble floor.

Titus is ferociously beaten by his wife at the end. Not because of anything Peaches said; but just on general suspicion.

== Cast ==
- Mae Busch as Peaches - the Old Flame
- Stan Laurel as Romaine Ricketts
- James Finlayson as Titus Tillsbury
- Oliver Hardy as Judge Chigger
- Charlotte Mineau as Mrs. Aggie Tillsbury
- Vivien Oakland as Mrs. Ricketts
- Ed Brandenburg as Waiter
- Charlie Hall as Tillsbury's butler
- Villie Latimer as Old Lady Scandal
- May Wallace as Mrs. Chigger
- Clara Guiol as Peaches' Maid
- Billie Latimer as Lady Scandal
- Leo Sulky as Restaurant Manager

== Production ==
Love 'em and Weep was filmed in January 1927 and released June 12 of that year by Pathé Exchange.

== Notes ==
- Since Laurel and Hardy appear in the film, it is considered an early Laurel and Hardy film despite the fact that Hardy's role is a bit part and they barely share any scenes in the film.
- The film was the first in which English character actor Charlie Hall was to appear with Laurel and Hardy.

== Remake ==
Love 'em and Weep was remade in 1931 as Chickens Come Home, with both Mae Busch and Stan Laurel reprising their roles. James Finlayson played the butler this time, replacing Charlie Hall, with Oliver Hardy taking on Finlayson's original role.
