= Oliver the Eighth =

Oliver The Eighth
- Directed by: Lloyd French
- Produced by: Hal Roach
- Starring: Stan Laurel; Oliver Hardy; Mae Busch; Jack Barty
- Cinematography: Art Lloyd
- Edited by: Bert Jordan
- Music by: LeRoy Shield; Ray Henderson; Marvin Hatley
- Distributed by: Metro-Goldwyn-Mayer
- Release date: January 13, 1934
- Running time: 26:45
- Country: United States
- Language: English

Oliver The Eighth is a 1934 American pre-Code comedy horror short film, starring Laurel and Hardy. It was directed by Lloyd French, produced by Hal Roach and distributed by MGM.

The film is primarily set in an opulent mansion. Ollie intends to court the wealthy widow who owns the mansion, and Stan insists on a share of Ollie's potential gains. The widow confronts them with a knife, but the two friends then wake from a shared nightmare.

== Plot ==
Laurel and Hardy, partners in a barbershop venture, encounter a classified advertisement in the newspaper placed by a wealthy widow seeking a new spouse. Initially, only Stan intends to respond to the ad, yet upon confiding his intentions to Ollie, both agree to vie for the widow's affections. This agreement, sealed with a handshake and Ollie's declaration of "May the best man win," is tainted by Ollie's deceitful act of withholding Stan's response and submitting only his own.

Upon Ollie's being invited to the widow's opulent mansion, Laurel discovers Ollie's subterfuge and insists on accompanying him, demanding an equitable share of any potential gains. At the mansion, they encounter a peculiar butler named Jitters, whose eccentric behavior and warning of the widow's murderous inclinations unsettle the duo. Stan and Ollie find themselves confined to an upstairs room by the widow and her butler, with ominous implications regarding their safety.

In a bid to stave off slumber and evade potential danger, Ollie devises a whimsical mechanism, employing a gold-coated brick and a candle to keep Stan awake. However, their efforts yield mishaps, including inadvertent injury and the eventual incapacitation of Ollie.

As the threat of the knife-wielding widow looms, Stan's desperate attempt to arm himself culminates in a chaotic climax. Stan and Ollie then abruptly find themselves back at their barbershop, with Ollie bewilderedly recounting a nightmarish dream.

== Cast ==
- Stan Laurel as Stanley
- Oliver Hardy as Ollie
- Mae Busch as Mrs. Fox, the widow
- Jack Barty as Jitters, the butler
