= Charley Rogers =

British actor (1887–1956)

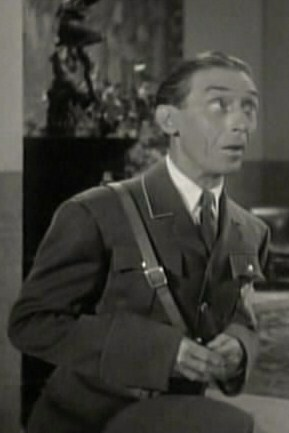
- Rogers in That Nazty Nuisance (1943)
- Born: 15 January 1887; Birmingham, Warwickshire, England
- Died: 20 December 1956 (aged 69); Los Angeles, California, US
- Occupations: Actor, film director and screenwriter
- Years active: 1912–1954

Charles Rogers (15 January 1887 – 20 December 1956) was an English film actor, director and screenwriter best known for his association with Laurel and Hardy. He was born in Birmingham, Warwickshire, England, and was the son of provincial English playwright Charles Rogers, and brother of actors John Rogers and Gerald Rogers.

In 1928, he joined the Laurel and Hardy crew on the Hal Roach lot, where he worked as an actor, writer, and ultimately director. Although he was known informally as "Charley," he was always billed on screen under his given name, Charles Rogers.

In 1931, Rogers was paired with Roach performer Charlie Hall in a short subject, Hopping Off (1931). The short was never released, and the remaining footage can be seen briefly in The Boy Friends short Wild Babies (1932).

In the 1940s, as an actor, Rogers was teamed briefly with Harry Langdon in feature films and with Andy Clyde for a few short comedies. Following this, Rogers became a writer for television and radio.

In 1956, Rogers died in Los Angeles, California, following injuries sustained in an automobile accident.

== Partial filmography ==
- Oliver Twist (1912) - Artful Dodger
- A Ticket to Red Horse Gulch (1914, Short)
- The Woman God Forgot (1917) - Cacamo
- The Light of Western Stars (1918) - Danny Marns
- Two Tars (1928, Short) - Motorist with Bent Fenders
- Habeas Corpus (1928, Short) - Ledoux - the Butler
- Double Whoopee (1929, Short) - Prime Minister (uncredited)
- Perfect Day (1929, Short) - The Parson (uncredited)
- Our Wife (1931, Short) - Finlayson's Butler (uncredited)
- Pardon Us (1931) - Insurgent Convict (uncredited)
- Pack Up Your Troubles (1932) - Rogers (uncredited)
- Fra Diavolo (1933)
- The Live Ghost (1934, Short)
- Going Bye-Bye! (1934, Short)
- Them Thar Hills (1934, Short)
- Babes in Toyland (1934) - Simple Simon (uncredited)
- Bonnie Scotland (1935)
- Tit for Tat (1935, Short)
- The Bohemian Girl (1936)
- Our Relations (1936)
- Way Out West (1937)
- Block-Heads (1938)
- The Flying Deuces (1939)
- A Chump at Oxford (1940)
- Saps at Sea (1940)
- Double Trouble (1941) - Alfred 'Alf' Prattle
- House of Errors (1942) - Alf
- They Raid by Night (1942) - Sgt. Harry Hall
- That Nazty Nuisance (1943) - Josef Goebbels (uncredited)
- The Dancing Masters (1943) - Butler (uncredited)
- Air Raid Wardens (1943)
- God's Country (1946) - Lumberjack (uncredited)
- Limelight (1952) - Man in Saloon (uncredited)
