= Laurel and Hardy =

English-American comedy duo

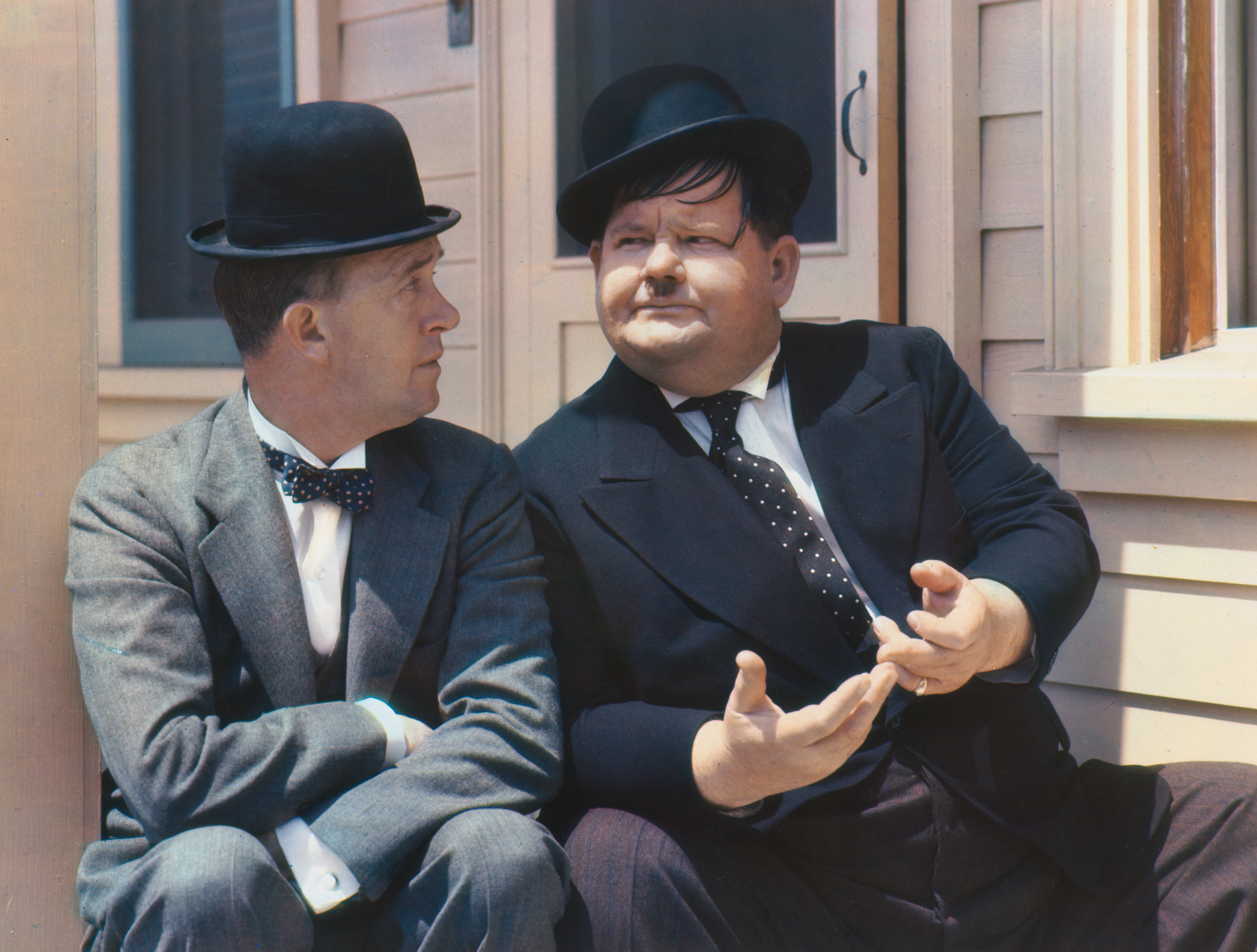
- Laurel (left) and Hardy in 1938
- Notable work: The Music Box, Babes in Toyland, Way Out West, Helpmates, Another Fine Mess, Sons of the Desert, Block-Heads, Busy Bodies, Towed in a Hole, Liberty, Big Business, The Battle of the Century, The Chimp

Comedy career
- Years active: 1927–1955
- Genres: Slapstick, comedy
- Former members: Stan Laurel; Oliver Hardy
- Website: laurel-and-hardy.com

Laurel and Hardy were a double act from 1927 to 1955, consisting of Englishman Stan Laurel (1890–1965) and American Oliver Hardy (1892–1957). Starting their career as a team in the silent film era, they transitioned easily to the new talking pictures and became internationally famous for their slapstick comedy. Laurel's character was clumsy and childlike; Hardy's was domineering and genteel, but both were inseparable friends. Their theme song, known variously as "The Cuckoo Song", "Ku-Ku", or "The Dance of the Cuckoos" (by Hollywood composer T. Marvin Hatley) was heard over their films' opening credits, and became as identified with them as their derby hats.

Before becoming a team, both had well-established film careers. Stan Laurel had been a vaudeville performer on European and American stages before joining the film industry in 1917; he was primarily a comedian but was also a talented writer and director. Oliver Hardy entered the film business as a theater projectionist, and became an actor in 1913. They first appeared together in 1921—purely by chance—in the short film The Lucky Dog, but did not encounter each other again until 1925, when both were working at the Hal Roach film studio. They officially became a team in 1927 when they appeared in the silent short Putting Pants on Philip. They remained with Roach until 1940, and then appeared in eight B movie comedies for 20th Century-Fox and Metro-Goldwyn-Mayer from 1941 to 1945. After finishing their film commitments at the end of 1944, they concentrated on performing stage shows, and embarked on a music hall tour of the British Isles. They made their last film in 1951, a French–Italian co-production called Atoll K. Thereafter they performed on stage, exclusively in Europe, until 1954.

They appeared as a team in 107 films, starring in 32 short silent films, 40 short sound films, and 23 full-length feature films. They also made 12 guest or cameo appearances, including the Galaxy of Stars promotional film of 1936. On December 1, 1954, they made their sole American television appearance, when they were surprised and interviewed by Ralph Edwards on his live NBC-TV program This Is Your Life.

Since the 1930s, their films have been released in numerous theatrical reissues, television revivals, 8 mm and 16 mm home movies, feature-film compilations, and home videos. The official Laurel and Hardy appreciation society is The Sons of the Desert, named after a fictional fraternal society in the film of the same name.

== Early careers ==
=== Stan Laurel ===
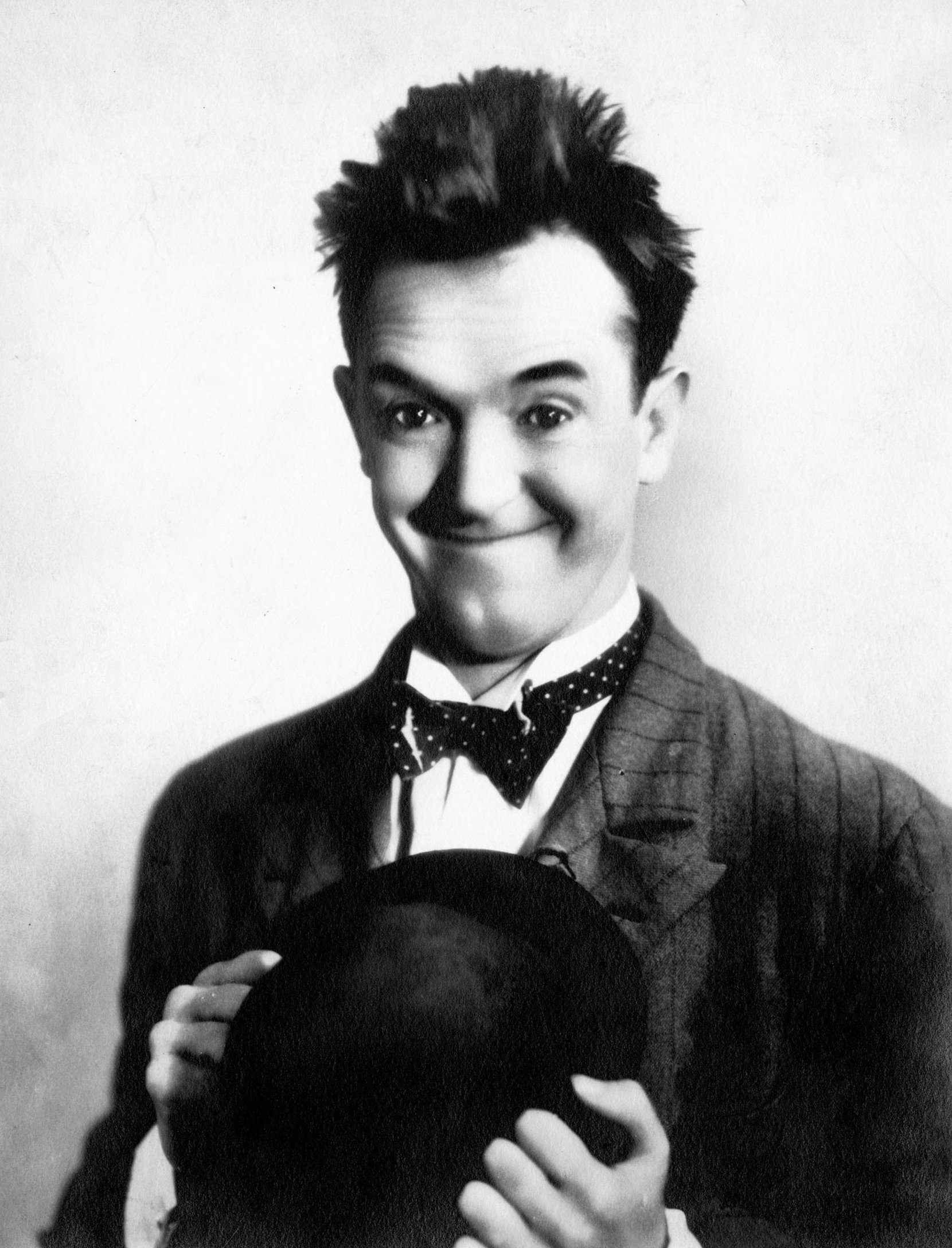
Stan Laurel, c. 1930

Stan Laurel (June 16, 1890 – February 23, 1965) was born Arthur Stanley Jefferson in Ulverston, Lancashire, England, into a theatrical family. His father, A. J. (Arthur Joseph) Jefferson, was a theatrical entrepreneur and theater owner in northern England and Scotland who, with his wife, was a major force in European show business. In 1905, the Jefferson family moved to Glasgow to be closer to their business mainstay of the Metropole Theatre, and Laurel made his stage debut in a Glasgow hall called the Britannia Panopticon one month short of his 16th birthday. Arthur Jefferson secured Laurel his first acting job with the juvenile theatrical company of Levy and Cardwell, which specialized in Christmas pantomimes. In 1909, Laurel was employed by Britain's leading comedy impresario Fred Karno as a supporting actor, and as an understudy for Karno's principal comedian Charlie Chaplin. Laurel said of Karno, "There was no one like him. He had no equal. His name was box-office."

In 1912, Laurel left England with the Fred Karno troupe to tour the United States. Laurel had expected the tour to be merely a pleasant interval before returning to London; however, he decided to remain in America. He teamed with vaudevillians Baldwin and Alice Cooke as "The Keystone Trio", with Laurel imitating Charlie Chaplin. In 1917, Laurel teamed with Mae Dahlberg for stage and film; they were living as common-law husband and wife. The same year, Laurel made his film debut with Dahlberg in Nuts in May. While working with Mae, he began using the name "Stan Laurel" and changed his name legally in 1931. Dahlberg demanded roles in his films, but her tempestuous nature made her difficult to work with. Dressing-room arguments were common between the two; producer Joe Rock paid her to leave Laurel and to return to her native Australia. In 1925, Laurel joined the Hal Roach film studio as a director and writer. From May 1925 to September 1926, he received credit in at least 22 films. Laurel appeared in more than 50 films for various producers before teaming with Hardy.

=== Oliver Hardy ===
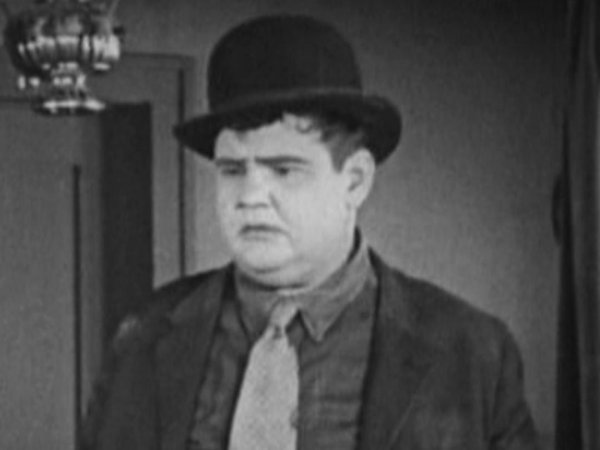
Oliver Hardy without his trademark moustache in Yes, Yes, Nanette (1925)

Oliver Hardy (January 18, 1892 – August 7, 1957) was born Norvell Hardy in Harlem, Georgia, United States. By his late teens, Hardy was a popular stage singer and he operated a moviehouse in Milledgeville, Georgia, the Palace Theater, financed in part by his mother. For his stage name he took his father's first name, calling himself "Oliver Norvell Hardy", while offscreen his friends called him "Babe". The nickname "Babe" originated from an Italian barber in Jacksonville, Florida, who would rub Hardy's face with talcum powder and say "That's nice-a baby!" His co-workers mimicked this, and Hardy was billed as "Babe Hardy" in his early films.

Seeing film comedies inspired him to take up comedy himself and, in 1913, he began working with Lubin Motion Pictures in Jacksonville. He started by helping around the studio with lights, props, and other duties, gradually learning the craft as a script clerk for the company. It was around this time that Hardy married his first wife, Madelyn Saloshin. In 1914, Hardy was billed as "Babe Hardy" in his first film, Outwitting Dad. Between 1914 and 1916 Hardy made 177 shorts with the Vim Comedy Company, which were released up to the end of 1917. Exhibiting a versatility in playing heroes, villains, and even female characters, Hardy was in demand for roles as a supporting actor, comic villain or second banana. For ten years he memorably assisted star comic and Charlie Chaplin imitator Billy West, and appeared in the comedies of Jimmy Aubrey, Larry Semon, and Charley Chase. In total, Hardy starred or co-starred in more than 250 silent shorts, of which roughly 150 have been lost. He was rejected for enlistment by the Army during World War I due to his large size. In 1917, following the collapse of the Florida film industry, Hardy and his wife Madelyn moved to California to seek new opportunities.

== History as Laurel and Hardy ==
=== Hal Roach ===
Hal Roach recounted how Laurel and Hardy became a team: Hardy was already working for Roach (and others) when Roach hired Laurel, whom he had seen in vaudeville. Laurel had very light-blue eyes, and Roach discovered that, due to the technology of film at that time, Laurel's eyes would not photograph properly: blue photographed as white. This problem is apparent in their first silent film together, The Lucky Dog, which tried to compensate for the problem by applying heavy makeup to Laurel's eyes.

In 1925 Laurel had just completed his starring series for Joe Rock, and a clause in the contract stipulated that Laurel could not appear on screen in competition with the Rock productions. Forced off the screen temporarily, Laurel worked behind the scenes for Hal Roach as a writer. Then panchromatic film was developed; they tested Laurel, and found the problem was solved. Laurel and Hardy were then cast together in a film. Comedy teams were usually composed of a straight man and a funny man, but these two were both comedians; each complemented the other and could play straight for each other. Roach said, "You could always cut to a close-up of either one, and their reaction was good for another laugh."

=== Leo McCarey ===
Screenwriter, director, and producer for Hal Roach Studios, Leo McCarey told an anecdote on the NBC television program This Is Your Life on December 1, 1954, of how a leg of lamb brought Laurel and Hardy together: "Babe was cooking a leg of lamb and for some reason he left his arm in the oven too long or something, and he got it so badly blistered that we had to cut down his part in the next picture. So we decided to put Stan in the picture to bolster up the comedy; and so when we saw the two of them on the screen together we decided: 'There's a real team.' And from that time on they really went places. All on account of 'Hardy had a little lamb.'"

=== Style of comedy and characterizations ===
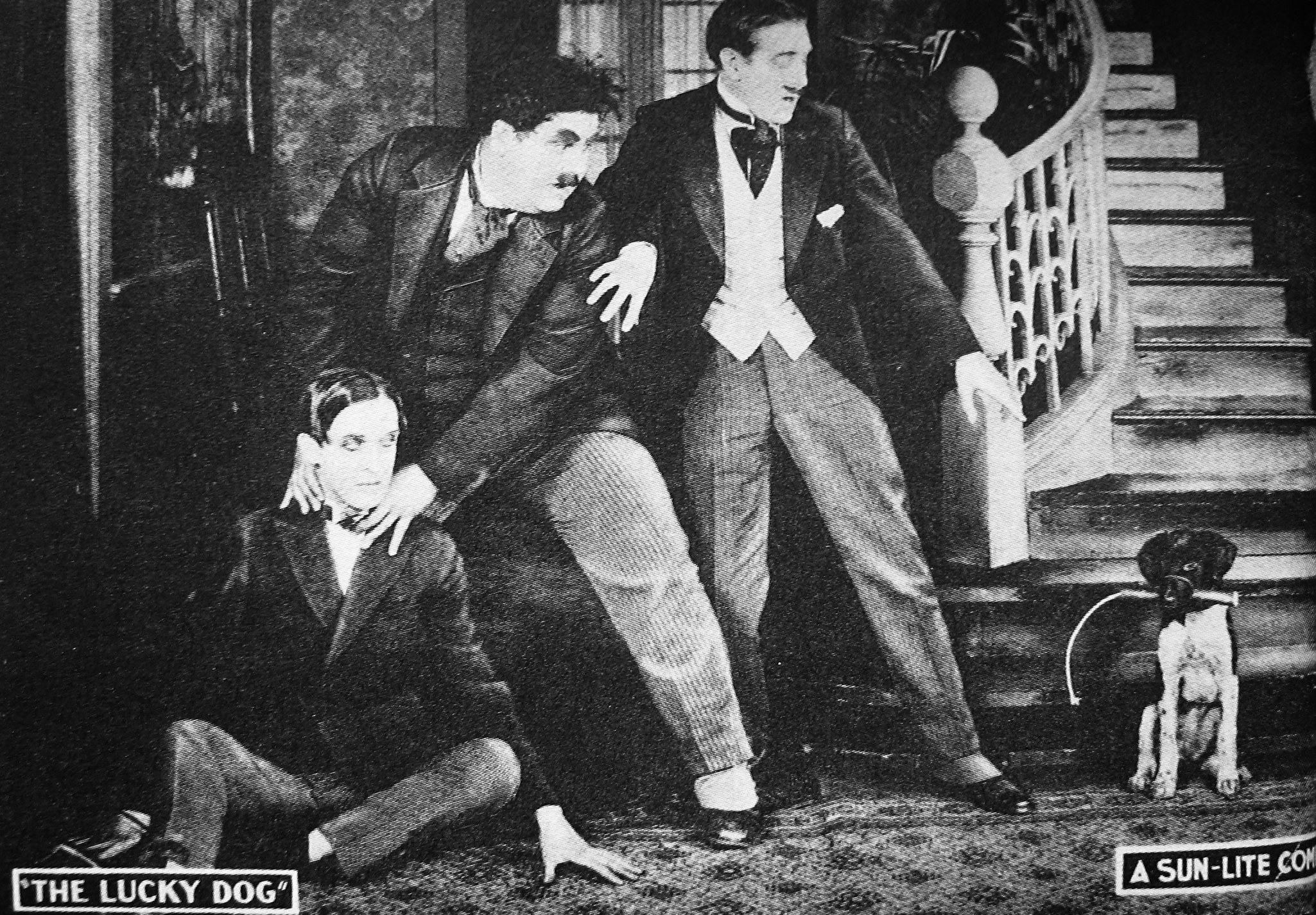
Laurel and Hardy in The Lucky Dog (1921)

The humor of Laurel and Hardy was highly visual, with slapstick used for emphasis. They often had physical arguments (in character) which were quite complex and involved slapstick violence. Their ineptitude and misfortune precluded them from making any real progress, even in the simplest endeavors. Much of their comedy involves "milking" a joke, where a simple idea provides a basis for multiple, ongoing gags without following a defined narrative.

Stan Laurel was of average height and weight, but appeared comparatively small and slight next to Oliver Hardy, who was 6 feet 1 inch (185 cm) and weighed about 280 pounds (127 kg; 20.0 st) in his prime. Details of their hair and clothing were used to enhance this natural contrast. Laurel kept his hair short on the sides and back, growing it long on top to create a natural "fright wig". Typically, at times of shock, he simultaneously screwed up his face to appear as if crying while pulling up his hair. To achieve a flat-footed walk, Laurel removed the heels from his shoes. In contrast, Hardy's thinning hair was pasted on his forehead in spit curls and he sported a toothbrush moustache. Both wore derby hats, with Laurel's being narrower than Hardy's, and with a flattened brim. The characters' normal attire called for wing collar shirts, with Hardy wearing a necktie which he would twiddle when he was particularly embarrassed or self-conscious; and Laurel, a bow tie. Hardy's sports jacket was a little small and done up with one straining button, whereas Laurel's double-breasted jacket was loose-fitting.

A popular routine was a "tit for tat" fight with an adversary. It could be with their wives—often played by Mae Busch, Anita Garvin, or Daphne Pollard—or with a neighbor, often played by Charlie Hall or James Finlayson. Laurel and Hardy would accidentally damage someone's property, and the injured party would retaliate by ruining something belonging to Laurel or Hardy. After calmly surveying the damage, one or the other of the "offended" parties found something else to vandalize, and the conflict escalated until both sides were simultaneously destroying items in front of each other. An early example of the routine occurs in their classic short Big Business (1929), which was added to the National Film Registry in 1992. Another short film which revolves around such an altercation was titled Tit for Tat (1935).

One of their best-remembered dialogue routines was "tell me that again". Laurel would tell Hardy a genuinely smart idea he came up with, and Hardy would reply, "Tell me that again." Laurel would then try to repeat the idea, but, having instantly forgotten it, recounted the idea in a jumbled, almost incoherent mess. Hardy, who had difficulty understanding Laurel's idea when expressed clearly, would then understand the scrambled version perfectly. While much of their comedy remained visual, humorous dialogue often occurred in Laurel and Hardy's talking films as well. Examples include:

- "You can lead a horse to water, but a pencil must be led." (Laurel, Brats)
- "I was dreaming I was awake, but I woke up and found meself asleep." (Laurel, Oliver the Eighth)
- "A lot of weather we've been having lately." (Hardy, Way Out West)

In some cases, their comedy bordered on the surreal, in a style Laurel called "white magic". For example, in the 1937 film Way Out West, Laurel flicks his thumb upward as if working a lighter. His thumb ignites and he matter-of-factly lights Hardy's pipe. Amazed at seeing this, Hardy unsuccessfully attempts to duplicate it throughout the film. Much later he finally succeeds, only to be terrified when his thumb catches fire. Laurel expands the joke in the 1938 film Block-Heads by pouring tobacco into his clenched fist and smoking it as though it were a pipe, again to Hardy's bemusement. This time, the joke ends when a match Laurel was using relights itself, Hardy throws it into the fireplace, and it explodes with a loud bang.

The 1927 film Sailors, Beware! was a significant one for Hardy because two of his enduring trademarks were developed. The first was his "tie twiddle" to demonstrate embarrassment. Hardy, while acting, had received a pail of water in the face. He said, "I had been expecting it, but I didn't expect it at that particular moment. It threw me mentally and I couldn't think what to do next, so I waved the tie in a kind of tiddly-widdly fashion to show embarrassment while trying to look friendly." His second trademark was the "camera look", where he breaks the fourth wall and, in frustration, stares directly at the audience. Hardy said: "I had to become exasperated, so I just stared right into the camera and registered my disgust."

=== Catchphrases ===
The catchphrase most associated with Laurel and Hardy is Hardy's frequent lament, "Well, here's another nice mess you've gotten me into!" It was used earlier by W. S. Gilbert in both The Mikado (1885) and The Grand Duke (1896). It was first used by Hardy in The Laurel-Hardy Murder Case in 1930. In popular culture, the catchphrase is often misquoted as "Well, here's another fine mess you've gotten me into", which was never spoken by Hardy—a misunderstanding that stems from the title of their film Another Fine Mess. Whenever Hardy used the phrase, Laurel's almost invariable response was to start to cry, pull his hair up, exclaim "Well, I couldn't help it..."

Some variations on the phrase occurred. For example, in Chickens Come Home, Ollie impatiently says to Stan, "Well...", and Stan continues for him: "Here's another nice mess I've gotten you into." The films Thicker than Water and The Fixer Uppers use the phrase "Well, here's another nice kettle of fish you've pickled me in!" In Saps at Sea, the phrase becomes "Well, here's another nice bucket of suds you've gotten me into!" The catchphrase, in its original form, was used as the last line of dialogue in the team's last film, Atoll K (1951).

In moments of particular distress or frustration, Hardy often exclaims, "Why don't you do something to help me?", as Laurel stands helplessly by.

"OH!" (or drawn out as "Ohhhhh-OH!") was another catchphrase used by Hardy. He uses the expression in the team's first sound film, Unaccustomed As We Are (1929), when his character's wife smashes a phonograph record over his head.

Mustachioed Scottish actor James Finlayson, who appeared in 33 Laurel and Hardy films, used a variation: "D'oh!" The phrase, expressing surprise, impatience, or incredulity, inspired the trademark "D'oh!" of character Homer Simpson (voiced by Dan Castellaneta) in the long-running animated comedy The Simpsons.

=== Films ===
Laurel and Hardy appeared together in 107 films over three decades, beginning as ensemble players before officially teaming in 1927. Their work progressed from silent shorts to sound films and feature-length productions, while retaining their signature comedic style through the years.

==== Silent films ====
Laurel and Hardy appeared for the first time together in The Lucky Dog (1921).

Laurel's and Hardy's first film pairing, although as separate performers, was in the silent The Lucky Dog. Its production details have not survived, but film historian Bo Berglund has placed it between September 1920 and January 1921. According to interviews they gave in the 1930s, the pair's acquaintance at the time was casual, and both had forgotten their initial film entirely. The plot sees Laurel's character befriended by a stray dog which, after some lucky escapes, saves him from being blown up by dynamite. Hardy's character is a mugger attempting to rob Laurel. They later signed separate contracts with the Hal Roach Studios, and next appeared in the 1926 film 45 Minutes From Hollywood.

Hal Roach is considered the most important person in the development of Laurel's and Hardy's film careers. He brought them together, and they worked for Roach for almost 20 years. Director Charley Rogers, who worked closely with the three men for many years, said, "It could not have happened if Laurel, Hardy, and Roach had not met at the right place and the right time." Wes D. Gehring identifies their first "official" film together as Putting Pants on Philip, released December 3, 1927. The plot involves Laurel as Philip, a young Scotsman who arrives in the United States in full kilted splendor, and suffers mishaps involving the kilts. His uncle, played by Hardy, tries to put trousers on him. William K. Everson identifies The Second Hundred Years as the first "official" Laurel and Hardy film in which they are presented as a team. Also in 1927, the pair starred in The Battle of the Century, a classic pie-throwing short involving over 3,000 real pies; only a fragment of the film was known to exist until the first half resurfaced in the 1970s; a more complete print was discovered in 2015 by historian Jon Mirsalis.

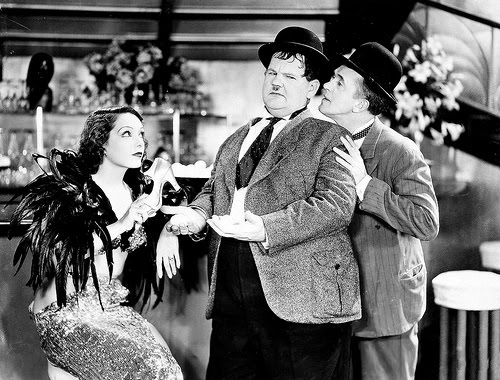
Laurel and Hardy with Lupe Vélez in Hollywood Party (1934)

Laurel said to the team's biographer John McCabe: "Of all the questions we're asked, the most frequent is, how did we come together? I always explain that we came together naturally." In 1926, both were part of the Hal Roach Comedy All Stars, a stock company of actors who took part in a series of films. Laurel's and Hardy's roles gradually grew larger, while those of their fellow stars diminished, because Laurel and Hardy had superior pantomime skills. Their teaming was suggested by Leo McCarey, their supervising director from 1927 to 1930. During that period, McCarey and Laurel jointly devised the team's format. McCarey also influenced the slowing of their comedy action from the silent era's typically frantic pace to a more natural one. The formula worked so well that Laurel and Hardy played the same characters for the rest of their careers.

Although Roach employed writers and directors such as H. M. Walker, Leo McCarey, James Parrott, and James W. Horne on the Laurel and Hardy films, Laurel, who had a considerable background in comedy writing, often rewrote entire sequences and scripts. He also encouraged the cast and crew to improvise, then meticulously reviewed the footage during editing. By 1929, he was the pair's head writer, and it was reported that the writing sessions were gleefully chaotic. Stan had three or four writers who competed with him in a perpetual game of 'Can You Top This?'. Hardy was quite happy to leave the writing to his partner. He said, "After all, just doing the gags was hard enough work, especially if you have taken as many falls and been dumped in as many mudholes as I have. I think I earned my money." Laurel eventually became so involved in their films' productions, many film historians and aficionados consider him an uncredited director. He ran the Laurel and Hardy set, no matter who was in the director's chair, but never asserted his authority. Roach remarked: "Laurel bossed the production. With any director, if Laurel said 'I don't like this idea,' the director didn't say 'Well, you're going to do it anyway.' That was understood." As Laurel made so many suggestions, there was not much left for the credited director to do.

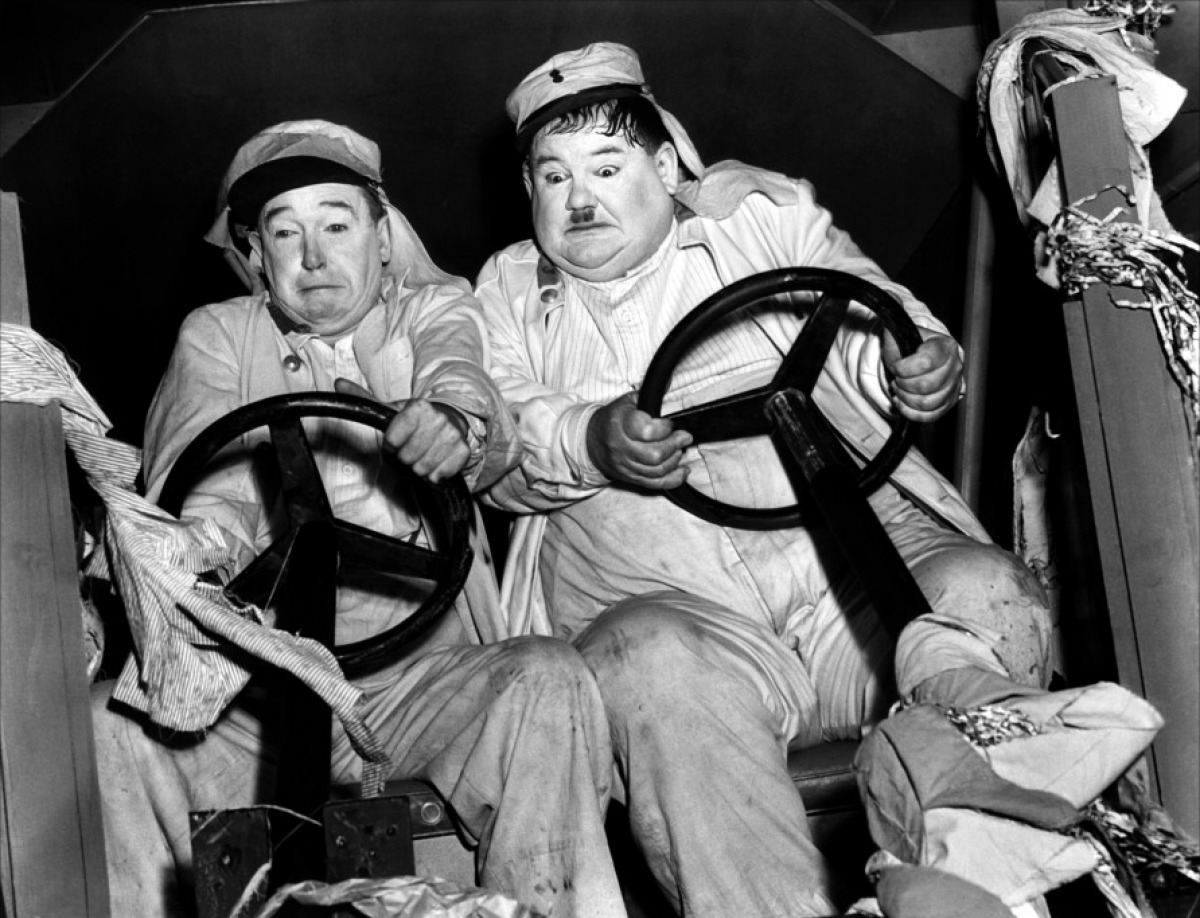
Laurel and Hardy in the 1939 film The Flying Deuces

Their 1929 release Big Business is by far the most critically acclaimed of the silents. Laurel and Hardy are Christmas tree salesmen who are drawn into a classic tit-for-tat battle with belligerent James Finlayson that eventually destroys his house and their car. Big Business was added to the United States National Film Registry as a national treasure in 1992.

==== Sound films ====
In 1929 the silent era of film was coming to an end. Many silent-film actors failed to make the transition to "talkies"—some, because they felt sound was irrelevant to their craft of conveying stories with body language; and others, because their spoken voices were considered inadequate for the new medium. However, the addition of spoken dialogue only enhanced Laurel's and Hardy's performances; both had extensive theatrical experience and could use their voices to great comic effect. Their films also continued to feature much visual comedy. In these ways, they made a seamless transition to their first sound film, Unaccustomed As We Are (1929), whose title was a play on the familiar phrase, "Unaccustomed as I am to public speaking". The trade periodical Exhibitors Herald commented on the team's successful transition to sound: "Incidentally, pantomime is still their strongest weapon. They use dialogue as a kind of punctuation."

The Music Box (1932), with the pair delivering a piano up a long flight of steps, won an Academy Award for Best Live Action Short Subject. The Music Box remains one of the most widely known Laurel and Hardy films.

Laurel and Hardy were favorites around the world, and Hal Roach catered to international audiences by filming many of their early talkies in other languages. They spoke their dialogue phonetically, in Spanish, Italian, French, or German. The plots remained similar to the English versions, although the supporting roles were often played by other actors who were fluent in the native language. Pardon Us (1931) was reshot in all four foreign languages. Blotto, Hog Wild and Be Big! were remade in French and Spanish versions. Night Owls was remade in both Spanish and Italian, and Below Zero and Chickens Come Home in Spanish.

==== Feature films ====
Just as Laurel and Hardy's teaming was accidental, so was their entry into the field of feature films. In the words of biographer John McCabe, "Roach planned to use the MGM set [built for The Big House] for a simple prison-break two-reeler but MGM suddenly added a proviso: Laurel and Hardy would have to do a picture for them in exchange. Roach would not agree so he built his own prison set, a very expensive item for a two-reeler. So expensive was it indeed that he added four more reels to bring it into the feature category and, it was hoped, the bigger market." The experiment was successful, and the team continued to make features along with their established short subjects until 1935, when they converted to features exclusively.

Sons of the Desert (1933) is often cited as Laurel and Hardy's best feature-length film. The situation-comedy script by actor-playwright Frank Craven and screenwriter Byron Morgan is stronger than usual for a Laurel & Hardy comedy, and versatile director William A. Seiter, who had made light comedies with Reginald Denny as well as outlandish ones with Wheeler and Woolsey, handled the film with a more controlled sense of pace and style than other directors of the team's features. Stan and Ollie are henpecked husbands who want to attend a convention held by the Sons of the Desert fraternal lodge. They tell their wives that Ollie requires an ocean voyage to Honolulu for his health, and they sneak off to the convention. They are unaware that the Honolulu-bound ship they were supposedly aboard is sinking, and the wives confront their errant husbands when they get home.

Babes in Toyland (1934) remains a perennial on American television during the Christmas season. When interviewed, Hal Roach spoke scathingly about the film and Laurel's behavior. Roach himself had written a treatment detailing the characters and storyline, only to find that Laurel considered Roach's effort totally unsuitable. Roach, affronted, tried to argue in favor of his treatment, but Laurel was adamant. Roach angrily gave up and allowed Laurel to make the film his way. The rift damaged Roach–Laurel relations to the point that Roach said that after Toyland, he did not want to produce for Laurel and Hardy. Although their association continued for another six years, Roach no longer took an active hand in Laurel and Hardy films.

Way Out West (1937) was a personal favorite of both Stan Laurel and Oliver Hardy. A satire of the Gene Autry musical westerns sweeping America at the time, the film combines Laurel and Hardy's slapstick routines with songs and dances performed by the stars.

=== Personal lives ===
Stan Laurel and Oliver Hardy always got along famously. In 1950 Hardy told interviewer Jack Mangan, "Stan and I have been together for 23 years and we're still friends. I think that's a record." Offscreen, Laurel and Hardy were quite the opposite of their movie characters: Laurel was the industrious "idea man", while Hardy was more easygoing. The secret of their success may have been that they had totally separate private lives and seldom saw each other socially. After a typical working day, Laurel would remain at the studio to confer with the writers or the director, and review the latest scenes with the film editor. Hardy would leave immediately for the golf course. "Charley Rogers tells of a practical way in which Stan harnessed Babe's love of golf for excellent use in the creation of the films," wrote biographer John McCabe. "Rogers recalls, 'At times Stan would deliberately hold off shooting the camera looks until the end of the shooting day, at a point when Babe would be dying to get out on the course. The result is that some of those exasperated looks you see Babe give are really exasperated looks!'" Hardy also enjoyed other hobbies, including cooking and watching sporting events. Laurel and Hardy were basically two friends who got together during working hours, and went their separate ways until the next working day. It wasn't until they began touring European cities in 1947 that they spent extended time together and became closer personally. Hardy's wife Lucille remembered Stan and Babe as being extremely close, "almost like brothers."

There was so very little friction between the two partners that, when the screen biography Stan & Ollie was being prepared, the screenwriter had to invent dramatic scenes showing Laurel and Hardy bitterly bickering and insulting each other. These scenes were entirely fictional and did not reflect the true, friendly relationship between Laurel and Hardy.

=== Career interruption ===
It appeared that the team would split permanently in 1938. Hal Roach had become dissatisfied with his distribution arrangement with Metro-Goldwyn-Mayer, and had begun releasing his films through United Artists. He still owed MGM one last feature, and made the Laurel and Hardy comedy Block-Heads, with the announcement that this would be Laurel and Hardy's farewell film. Stan Laurel's contract with Roach then expired, and Roach did not renew it. Oliver Hardy's contract was still in force, however, and Roach starred Hardy solo in the antebellum comedy Zenobia (1939), with Harry Langdon as Hardy's comic foil. This fueled rumors that Laurel and Hardy had split on bad terms.

After Zenobia, Laurel rejoined Hardy and the team signed with independent producer Boris Morros for the comedy feature The Flying Deuces (1939). Meanwhile, Hal Roach wanted to demonstrate his new idea of making four-reel, 40-minute featurettes—twice the length of standard two-reel, 20-minute comedies—which Roach felt could fit more conveniently into double-feature programs. He referred to these extended films as "streamliners". To test his theory, Roach rehired Laurel and Hardy. The resulting films, A Chump at Oxford and Saps at Sea (both 1940), were prepared as featurettes. United Artists overruled Roach and insisted that they be released as full-length features.

Hoping for greater artistic freedom, Laurel and Hardy split with Roach, and signed with 20th Century-Fox in 1941 and MGM in 1942. However, their working conditions were now completely different: they were simply hired actors, relegated to both studios' B-film units, and not initially allowed to contribute to the scripts or improvise, as they had always done. When their films proved popular, the studios allowed them more input, and they starred in eight features until the end of 1944. These films, while far from their best work, were still very successful. Budgeted between $300,000 and $450,000 each, they earned millions at the box office for Fox and MGM. The Fox films were so profitable that the studio kept making Laurel and Hardy comedies after it discontinued its other "B" series films.

The busy team decided to take a rest during 1946, but 1947 saw their first European tour in 15 years. A film based in the characters of "Robin Hood" was planned during the tour, but not realized. In 1947, Laurel and Hardy famously attended the reopening of the Dungeness loop of the Romney, Hythe and Dymchurch Railway, where they performed improvised routines with a steam locomotive for the benefit of local crowds and dignitaries.

In 1948, on the team's return to America, Laurel was sidelined by illness and temporarily unable to work. He encouraged Hardy to take movie roles on his own. Hardy's friend John Wayne hired him to co-star in The Fighting Kentuckian (1949) for Republic Pictures, and Bing Crosby got him a small part in Frank Capra's Riding High (1950).

In 1950–51, Laurel and Hardy made their final feature-length film together, Atoll K. A French–Italian co-production directed by Léo Joannon, it was plagued by problems with language barriers, production issues, and both actors' serious health issues. When Laurel received the script's final draft, he felt its heavy political content overshadowed the comedy. He quickly rewrote it, with screen comic Monte Collins contributing visual gags, and hired old friend Alfred Goulding to direct the Laurel and Hardy scenes. During filming, Hardy developed an irregular heartbeat, while Laurel experienced painful prostate complications that caused his weight to drop to 114 pounds (52 kg; 8.1 st). Critics were disappointed with the storyline, English dubbing, and Laurel's sickly physical appearance. The film was not commercially successful on its first release, and brought an end to Laurel and Hardy's film careers. Atoll K did finally turn a profit when it was rereleased in other countries. In 1954, an American distributor removed 18 minutes of footage and released it as Utopia; widely released on film and video, it is the film's best-known version.

After Atoll K wrapped in April 1951, Laurel and Hardy returned to America and used the remainder of the year to rest. Stan appeared, in character, in a silent TV newsreel, Swim Meet, judging a local California swimming contest.

Almost all of the Laurel and Hardy films have survived and are still in circulation. Only three of their 107 films are considered lost and have not been seen in complete form since the 1930s. The first half of the silent film Now I'll Tell One (1927), with Laurel and Hardy appearing as ensemble players, is lost, and the second half has yet to be released on video. Of the team efforts, the silent film Hats Off from 1927 has vanished completely. The Battle of the Century (1927), after years of obscurity as a three-minute fragment, is now almost complete with only a few minutes missing. In the 1930 operatic Technicolor musical The Rogue Song, Laurel and Hardy appeared as comedy relief in ten sequences; only one exists. The complete soundtrack, recorded on discs, has survived.

=== Radio ===
Laurel and Hardy made at least two audition recordings for radio: a half-hour NBC series based on the skit Driver's License, and a 1944 NBC pilot for The Laurel and Hardy Show, casting Stan and Ollie in different occupations each episode. The surviving audition record, "Mr. Slater's Poultry Market," has Stan and Ollie as meat-market butchers mistaken for vicious gangsters. A third attempt was commissioned by BBC Radio in 1953: Laurel and Hardy Go to the Moon, a series of science fiction comedies. A sample script was written by Tony Hawes and Denis Gifford, and the comedians staged a read-through, which was not recorded. The team was forced to withdraw due to Hardy's declining health, and the project was abandoned.

=== Final years ===
Following the making of Atoll K, Laurel and Hardy took some months off to deal with health issues. On their return to the European stage in 1952, they undertook a well-received series of public appearances, performing a short Laurel-written sketch, "A Spot of Trouble". The following year, Laurel wrote a routine titled "Birds of a Feather". On September 9, 1953, their boat arrived in Cobh in Ireland. Laurel recalled their reception:

The love and affection we found that day at Cobh was simply unbelievable. There were hundreds of boats blowing whistles and mobs and mobs of people screaming on the docks. We just couldn't understand what it was all about. And then something happened that I can never forget. All the church bells in Cobh started to ring out our theme song "Dance of the Cuckoos" and Babe [Oliver Hardy] looked at me and we cried. I'll never forget that day. Never.

On May 17, 1954, Laurel and Hardy made their last live stage appearance in Plymouth, UK at the Palace Theatre.

=== New popularity ===
In 1949 Laurel and Hardy first appeared on network television, in their 1931 feature Pardon Us. The team's Hal Roach comedies, both shorts and features, were syndicated to local TV stations in 1950 and were an instant success. Although Laurel and Hardy did not receive any residual payments for these broadcasts, they were pleased to be back in the public eye after being away from the screen for so long.

With the films receiving so much exposure, fans old and new were curious about the team's current whereabouts. Television producer Ralph Edwards noticed this wave of interest and mounted a surprise tribute. On December 1, 1954, Laurel and Hardy made their only American television appearance on the live NBC-TV program This Is Your Life. They were lured to the Knickerbocker Hotel under the pretense of a business meeting with British producer Bernard Delfont. The doors opened to their suite, #205, flooding the room with light as Edwards announced, "Mr. Stan Laurel? Mr. Oliver Hardy! These are your lives!" The half-hour tribute reunited Laurel and Hardy with their former friends and colleagues, to the comedians' stunned surprise. The telecast was preserved on a kinescope and later released on home video.

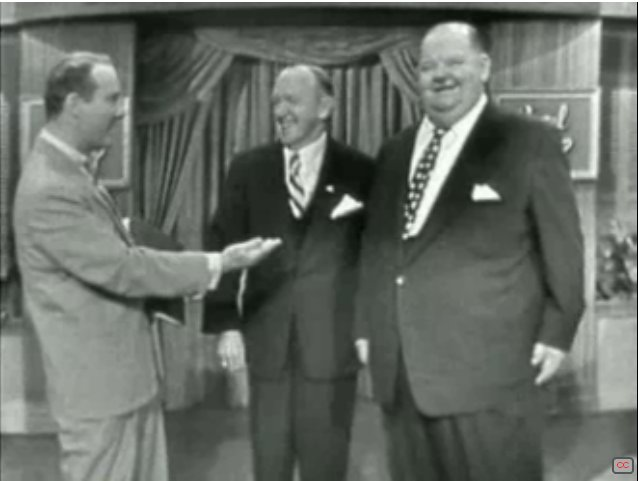
Laurel and Hardy on NBC's This Is Your Life, December 1, 1954

Partly due to the broadcast's positive response, the team began renegotiating with Hal Roach Jr. for a series of color NBC Television specials, to be called Laurel and Hardy's Fabulous Fables. However, the plans had to be shelved as the aging comedians continued to suffer from declining health. In 1955, TV Guide ran a color spread on the team with current photos. That year, they made their final public appearance together while taking part in This Is Music Hall, a BBC Television program about the Grand Order of Water Rats, a British variety organization. Laurel and Hardy provided a filmed insert where they reminisced about their friends in British variety. They made their final appearance on camera in 1956 in a private home movie, shot by a family friend at the Reseda, California home of Stan Laurel's daughter, Lois. The three-minute film has no sound.

In 1956, while following his doctor's orders to improve his health due to a heart condition, Hardy lost over 100 pounds (45 kg; 7.1 st), but nonetheless suffered several strokes causing reduced mobility and speech. Despite his long and successful career, Hardy's home was sold to help cover his medical expenses. He died of a stroke on August 7, 1957, and longtime friend Bob Chatterton said Hardy weighed just 138 pounds (63 kg; 9.9 st) at the time of his death. Hardy was laid to rest at Pierce Brothers' Valhalla Memorial Park, North Hollywood.

=== After Hardy's death ===
Producer Robert Youngson was working on a feature-length compilation of silent comedies, largely featuring Laurel and Hardy, when Oliver Hardy died. The new film, The Golden Age of Comedy was released in December 1957. It was a huge success and revitalized Laurel and Hardy as a big-screen attraction. Youngson continued to showcase Laurel and Hardy in seven more feature films, through 1970.

With the Laurel and Hardy partnership curtailed by Hardy's death, Stan Laurel refused to perform, and declined Stanley Kramer's offer of a cameo in the 1963 film It's a Mad, Mad, Mad, Mad World. In 1960, Laurel was given a special Academy Award for his contributions to film comedy, but was unable to attend the ceremony due to poor health. Actor Danny Kaye accepted the award on his behalf. Despite not appearing on screen after Hardy's death, Laurel did contribute gags to several comedy filmmakers. His favorite TV comedy was Leonard B. Stern's I'm Dickens, He's Fenster, co-starring John Astin and Marty Ingels as carpenters. Laurel enjoyed the Astin–Ingels chemistry and sent two-man gags to Stern.

During this period, most of his communication was in the form of written correspondence, and he insisted on personally answering every fan letter. Late in life, he welcomed visitors from the new generation of comedians and celebrities, including Dick Cavett, Jerry Lewis, Peter Sellers, Marcel Marceau, Johnny Carson, and Dick Van Dyke. Jerry Lewis offered Laurel a job as consultant, but he chose to help only on Lewis's 1960 feature The Bellboy. Laurel lived to see the team's work rediscovered through television and film revivals.

Dick Van Dyke was a longtime fan and based his comedy and dancing styles on Laurel's. When he discovered Laurel's home number in the phone book and called him, Laurel invited him over for the afternoon.

Stan Laurel died on February 23, 1965, in Santa Monica and is buried at Forest Lawn–Hollywood Hills in Los Angeles. His passing prompted three major media tributes in 1965. Van Dyke hosted a television tribute to Stan Laurel. Anthologist Robert Youngson produced Laurel and Hardy's Laughing '20s, a compilation feature of the team's silent-film highlights, released internationally by MGM. Blake Edwards's large-scale salute to slapstick, The Great Race, was dedicated to "Mr. Laurel and Mr. Hardy".

=== Supporting cast members ===
Laurel and Hardy's films included a supporting cast of comic actors, some of whom appeared regularly:

- Harry Bernard (former vaudeville partner of Charley Chase) played supporting roles as a waiter, bartender, or policeman.
- Mae Busch often played the formidable Mrs. Hardy and other characters, particularly sultry femmes fatales.
- Charley Chase, the Hal Roach film star and brother of James Parrott, a writer/director of several Laurel and Hardy films, made four appearances.
- Dorothy Coburn appeared in nearly a dozen early silent shorts.
- Baldwin Cooke (former vaudeville partner of Stan Laurel) played supporting roles as a waiter, colleague, or neighbor.
- Richard Cramer appeared as a scowling, menacing villain or opponent.
- Peter Cushing, well before becoming a star in Hammer Horror films, played one of the students in A Chump at Oxford.
- Bobby Dunn appeared as a cross-eyed bartender and telegram messenger, as well as the genial shoplifter in Tit for Tat.
- Eddie Dunn made several appearances, notably as the belligerent taxi driver in Me and My Pal.
- James Finlayson, a balding, mustachioed Scotsman known for displays of indignation and squinting, pop-eyed "double takes," made 33 appearances and is perhaps their most celebrated foil.
- Anita Garvin appeared in a number of Laurel and Hardy films, often cast as Mrs. Laurel.
- Billy Gilbert made many appearances, most notably as bombastic, blustery characters such as those in The Music Box (1932) and Block-Heads.
- Charlie Hall, who usually played angry, diminutive adversaries, appeared nearly 50 times.
- Jean Harlow had a small role in the silent short Double Whoopee (1929) and two other films in the early part of her career.
- Arthur Housman made several appearances as a comic drunk.
- Isabelle Keith was the only actress to appear as wife to both Laurel and Hardy (in Perfect Day and Be Big!, respectively).
- Edgar Kennedy, master of the "slow burn," often appeared as a cop, a hostile neighbor, or a relative.
- Walter Long played grizzled, unshaven, physically threatening villains.
- Sam Lufkin appeared several times, usually as a husky authority figure.
- Charles Middleton made a handful of appearances, usually as a sourpuss adversary.
- James C. Morton appeared as a bartender or exasperated policeman.
- Vivien Oakland appeared in several early silent films, and later talkies including Scram! and Way Out West.
- Blanche Payson, a former policewoman, was featured in several sound shorts, including Oliver's formidable wife in Helpmates.
- Daphne Pollard was featured as Oliver's diminutive but daunting wife.
- Viola Richard appeared in several early silent films, most notably as the beautiful cave girl in Flying Elephants (1928).
- Charley Rogers, an English actor and gag writer, appeared several times.
- Tiny Sandford was a tall, burly, physically imposing character actor who played authority figures, usually policemen.
- Thelma Todd appeared several times before her own career as a comic leading lady.
- Ben Turpin, the cross-eyed Mack Sennett comedy star, made two memorable appearances.
- Ellinor Vanderveer made many appearances as a dowager, high society matron, or posh party guest.

=== Music ===
Laurel and Hardy's famous signature tune, known variously as "The Cuckoo Song", "Ku-Ku" or "The Dance of the Cuckoos", was composed by Roach musical director Marvin Hatley as the on-the-hour chime for KFVD, the Roach studio's radio station.

Laurel heard the tune on the station and asked Hatley if they could use it as the Laurel and Hardy theme song. The original theme, recorded by two clarinets in 1930, was recorded again with a full orchestra in 1935. Leroy Shield composed most of the background music used in the Laurel and Hardy sound films produced by Hal Roach.

A compilation of songs from their films, titled Trail of the Lonesome Pine, was released in 1975. The title track was released as a single in the UK and reached number 2 in the UK singles chart.

== Influence and legacy ==
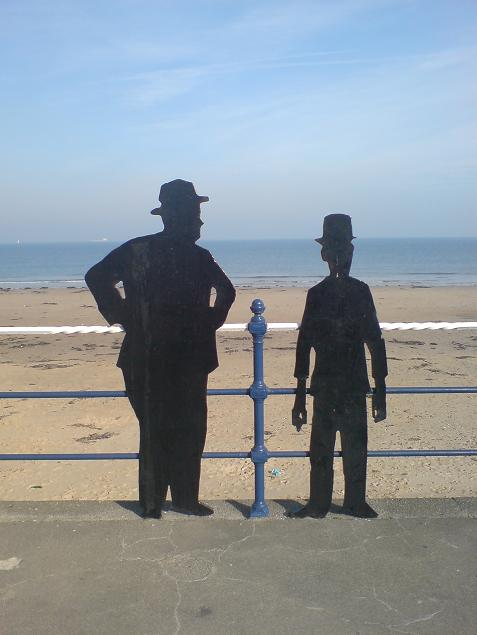
Silhouette portrait of the duo in Redcar, England

Laurel and Hardy's influence over a very broad range of comedy and other genres has been considerable. Lou Costello of the famed duo Abbott and Costello stated, "They were the funniest comedy team in the world." Many critics and film scholars throughout the years have agreed with this assessment; writers, artists, and performers as diverse as Samuel Beckett, Jerry Lewis, Lucille Ball, Peter Sellers, Marcel Marceau, Steve Martin, John Cleese, Harold Pinter, Alec Guinness, J. D. Salinger, René Magritte, and Kurt Vonnegut have acknowledged an artistic debt.

Starting in 1949 and continuing for decades, the widespread exposure of their films on television ensured a continued influence on generations of comedians and fans.

=== Posthumous revivals and popular culture ===
Since the 1930s, the works of Laurel and Hardy have been reissued in numerous theatrical revivals, television airings (particularly on public and cable television), 16 mm and 8 mm home movies, feature-film compilations, and home video. The comedians were later impersonated by Jim MacGeorge (as Laurel) and Chuck McCann (as Hardy) in children's television shows and commercials for various products.

Numerous colorized versions of Laurel and Hardy features and shorts have been reproduced by several studios. The process was introduced in 1983 by Colorization, Inc., in partnership with Hal Roach Studios, then a Canadian concern licensing its name and films. Early efforts included Helpmates, Way Out West, and The Music Box, which were released to television and issued on VHS videotape. Most of the team's sound shorts were ultimately colorized for distribution in Europe. The pixel-based color process and conversion from the American NTSC system to the European PAL system often affected image sharpness, so since 2011, video distributors have issued the original black-and-white editions.

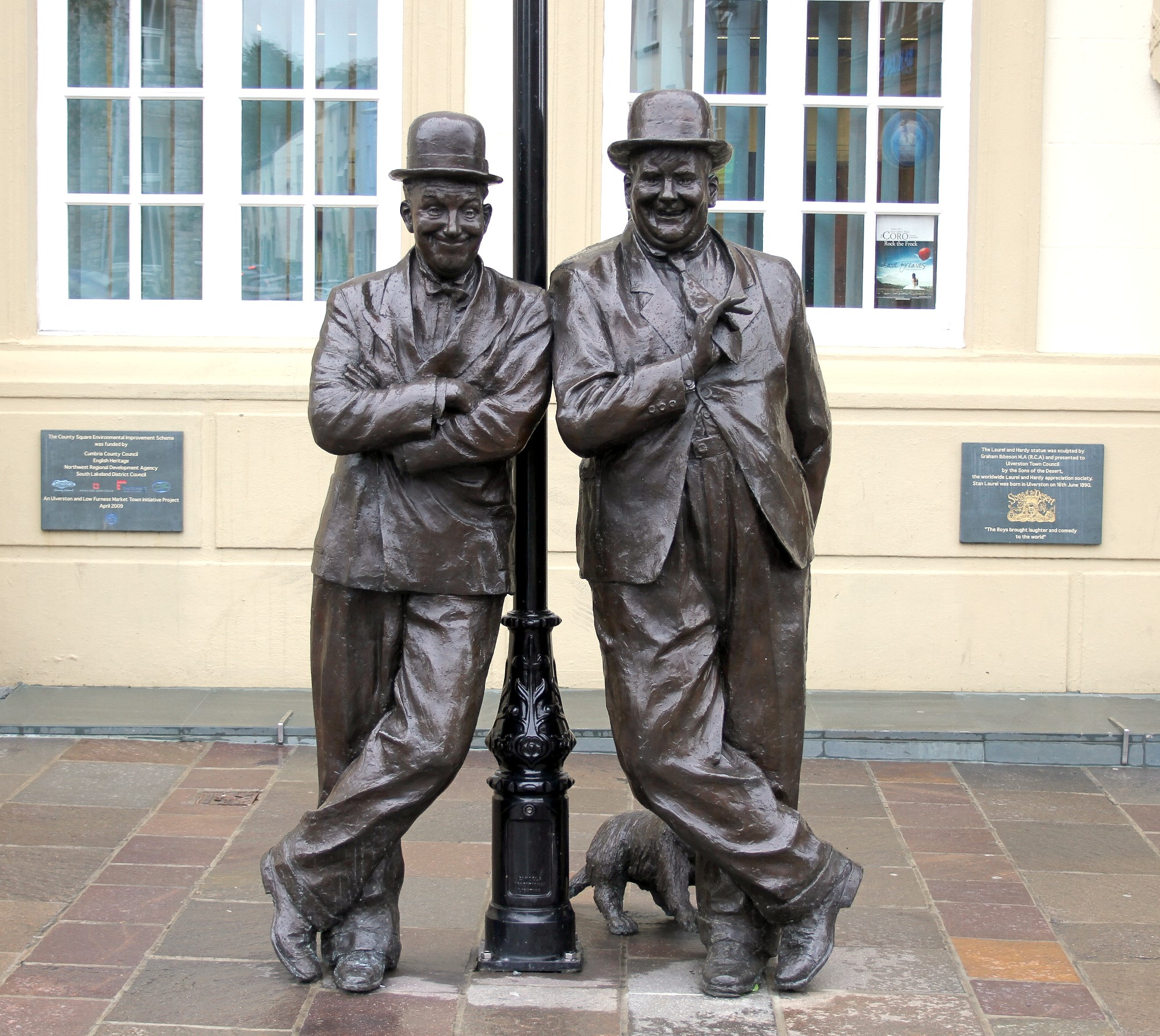
Statue of Stan Laurel and Oliver Hardy outside the Coronation Hall Theatre, Ulverston, Cumbria, England (Laurel's birthplace)

There are three Laurel and Hardy museums. One is in Laurel's birthplace of Ulverston, England, another is in Hardy's birthplace of Harlem, Georgia, United States, and the third is in Solingen, Germany.

Maurice Sendak featured three Oliver Hardy-like bakers in his 1970 Caldecott Medal-winning book In the Night Kitchen. Sendak described his early upbringing as sitting in movie houses fascinated by the Laurel and Hardy comedies. Cut-outs of the duo appear on the cover of Sgt. Pepper's Lonely Hearts Club Band (1967) by The Beatles. In 2005, Laurel and Hardy were voted the seventh-greatest comedy act of all time by a UK poll of professional comedians.

Merchandiser and TV producer Larry Harmon claimed ownership of Laurel and Hardy's likenesses and issued toys, coloring books, and an animated series in 1966, co-produced with Hanna-Barbera. Animated versions of Laurel and Hardy also guest-starred in a 1972 episode of The New Scooby-Doo Movies. In 1999, Harmon produced the direct-to-video feature The All New Adventures of Laurel & Hardy in For Love or Mummy, starring Bronson Pinchot and Gailard Sartain as the nephews of the famous duo.

The North American rights to much of the Laurel and Hardy library are now owned by Chicken Soup for the Soul Entertainment, successor to Cabin Fever, RHI, Hallmark, and Sonar. International rights are held by the CCA, while Harmon's estate owns their trademarks and likenesses.

In 2011, Arte and ZDF co-produced a 90-minute documentary, Laurel & Hardy: Their Lives and Magic, written and directed by German filmmaker Andreas Baum. The film included rare footage, interviews, and photos, and was later released as a 105-minute Director's Cut with 70 minutes of bonus material on DVD.

In 2024, Baum and co-author Michael Ehret published Laurel and Hardy: A True Love Story – The Pictorial History of Stan & Ollie: Their Life and Work (Volume 1), a 500-page illustrated book accompanied by a documentary DVD.

In 2026, Laurel was depicted in a Twix poster campaign featuring iconic duos without their other half, called "Two Is More Than One".

=== Appreciation society ===
The official Laurel and Hardy appreciation society is known as The Sons of the Desert, after a fraternal society in their film of the same name (1933). It was established in New York City in 1965 by Laurel and Hardy biographer John McCabe, with Orson Bean, Al Kilgore, Chuck McCann, and John Municino as founding members, with the sanction of Stan Laurel. Since the group's inception, well over 150 chapters of the organization have formed across North America, Europe, and Australia. An Emmy-winning documentary featurette about the group, Revenge of the Sons of the Desert, has been released on DVD as part of The Laurel and Hardy Collection, Vol. 1.

=== Around the world ===
Laurel and Hardy are popular around the world but are known under different names in various countries and languages.

Country	Nickname
Albania	"Olio dhe Stelio", "I Holli dhe i Trashi" (Thin and Thick)
Poland	"Flip i Flap" (Flip and Flap)
Germany	"Dick und Doof" (Fat and Dumb)
Brazil	"O Gordo e o Magro" (The Fat One and the Skinny One)
Sweden	"Helan och Halvan" (The Whole and the Half)
Norway	"Helan og Halvan" (The Whole and the Half)
Spanish-speaking countries	"El Gordo y el Flaco" (The Fat One and the Skinny One)
Italy	"Stanlio e Ollio" also as "Cric e Croc" up to the 1970s
Hungary	"Stan és Pan" (Stan and Pan)
Romania	"Stan și Bran" (Stan and Bran)
The Netherlands, Flemish Belgium	"Laurel en Hardy", "Stan en Ollie", "De Dikke en de Dunne" (The Fat [One] and the Skinny [One])
Denmark	"Gøg og Gokke" (Roughly translates to Wacky and Pompous)
Portugal	"Bucha e Estica" (The Fat One and the Skinny One)
Croatia, Serbia, Bosnia, North Macedonia, Montenegro	"Stanlio i Olio" (Cyrillic: Станлио и Олио)
Slovenia	"Stan in Olio"
Greece	"Hondros kai Lignos" (Χοντρός και Λιγνός) (Fat and Skinny)
India (Marathi)	"जाड्या आणि रड्या" (Fatso and the Crybaby)
India (Punjabi)	"Moota Paatla" (Laurel and Hardy) (Fat and Skinny)
India (Telugu)	"Lamboo Jamboo" (లంబూ జంబూ) (Laurel and Hardy) (Fat and Skinny)
Finland	Ohukainen ja Paksukainen (Thin one and Thick one)
Iceland	"Steini og Olli"
Israel	"השמן והרזה" (ha-Shamen ve ha-Raze, The Fat and the Skinny)
Vietnam (South)	"Mập – Ốm" (The Fat and the Skinny)
Korea (South)	"뚱뚱이와 홀쭉이" (The Fat and the Skinny)
Malta	"L-Oħxon u l-Irqiq" ("The Fat and the Thin One")
Iran	"چاق و لاغر" ("The Fat and the Skinny")
Pakistan	”الف نون" ("The Fat and the Skinny")
Thailand	"อ้วนผอมจอมยุ่ง" ("The Clumsy Fat and Thin")

=== Screen biography ===
A biographical film titled Stan & Ollie directed by Jon S. Baird and starring Steve Coogan as Stan and John C. Reilly as Oliver was released in 2018 and chronicled the team's 1953 tour of Great Britain and Ireland. The film received positive reviews from critics, garnering a 94% "Fresh" rating on Rotten Tomatoes. For their performances, Reilly was nominated for a Golden Globe and Coogan was nominated for a BAFTA.

== Filmographies ==
- Laurel and Hardy filmography
- Oliver Hardy filmography
- Stan Laurel filmography

== See also ==
- Little and Large – British comedy double act
- Pekka and Pätkä – Finnish comedy film series
