= Laurel and Hardy filmography =

This list contains only the films that Laurel and Hardy made together. For their solo films see Stan Laurel filmography and Oliver Hardy filmography.

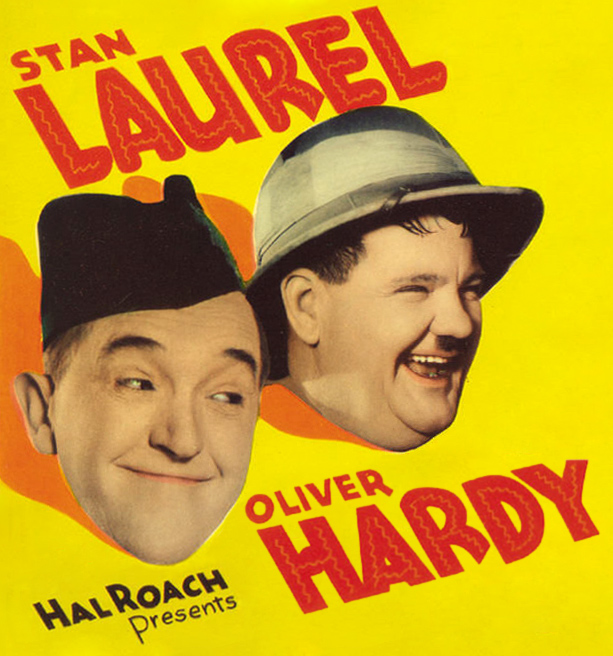
Laurel (left) and Hardy in Bonnie Scotland (1935)

Laurel and Hardy were a motion picture comedy team whose official filmography consists of 106 films released between 1921 and 1951. Together they appeared in 34 silent shorts,^{A} 45 sound shorts, and 27 full-length sound feature films.^{B} In addition to these, Laurel and Hardy appeared in at least 20 foreign-language versions of their films and a promotional film, Galaxy of Stars (1936), produced for European film distributors.

Stan Laurel (1890–1965) and Oliver Hardy (1892–1957) were established as film comedians prior to their teaming, with Laurel appearing in over 50 silent films and Hardy in over 250. (Hardy also appeared in three sound features without Laurel.) Although they first worked together in the film The Lucky Dog (1921), this was a chance pairing and it was not until 1926 when both separately signed contracts with the Hal Roach film studio that they appeared in film shorts together. Wes D. Gehring identifies their first "official" film together as Putting Pants on Philip (1927), William K. Everson identifies The Second Hundred Years (1927) as the first "official" Laurel and Hardy film in which they are presented as a team. Should Married Men Go Home? (1928) was the first Hal Roach film to bill Laurel and Hardy as a team. Previous appearances together were billed under the Roach "All-Star Comedy" banner. The pair remained with the Roach studio until 1940. Between 1941 and 1945, they appeared in eight features and one short for 20th Century Fox and Metro-Goldwyn-Mayer. After finishing their film commitments, Laurel and Hardy concentrated on stage shows, embarking on a music hall tour of Great Britain. In 1951, they appeared in their last film, Atoll K, a French/Italian co-production.

In 1932, Laurel and Hardy's short The Music Box won the Academy Award for Live Action Short Film (Comedy). In 1960, Laurel was presented with an Academy Honorary Award "for his creative pioneering in the field of cinema comedy." In 1992, 1997, 2012 and 2020 respectively, Big Business (1929), The Music Box, Sons of the Desert (1933) and The Battle of the Century (1927) were added to the United States National Film Registry by the Library of Congress as being "culturally, historically, or aesthetically significant." For their contributions to cinema, Laurel and Hardy have been awarded separate stars on the Hollywood Walk of Fame.

== Filmography ==
=== Official films ===
The following is a list of Laurel and Hardy's official filmography as established in Laurel and Hardy: The Magic Behind the Movies by Randy Skretvedt and Laurel and Hardy by John McCabe, Al Kilgore, and Richard W. Bann. Each book lists 105 films and Skredvedt's adds a 106th in its appendix, Now I'll Tell One, a previously lost film that was partly rediscovered.

Except where noted, all of these films were photographed in black and white, produced by Hal Roach, and released by Metro-Goldwyn-Mayer. Except where noted, all short films are two reels in length. All films produced prior to 1928 are silent and all films made after 1929 are sound. Releases from 1928 are silent except as noted. 1929 releases are identified as silent, all-talkie, or sound films with music and sound effects only.

Release date	Title	Short / feature	Notes	Public Domain Status
December 1, 1921	The Lucky Dog	Short	Produced by Shiller Productions	Public Domain
December 13, 1926	45 Minutes from Hollywood	Short	Released by Pathé Exchange; Hardy in a supporting role and Laurel in a bit part	Public Domain
March 13, 1927	Duck Soup	Short	Released by Pathé Exchange; Based on "Home from the Honeymoon", a sketch written by Arthur J. Jefferson (Stan Laurel's father)	Public Domain
April 3, 1927	Slipping Wives	Short	Released by Pathé Exchange	Public Domain
June 12, 1927	Love 'em and Weep	Short	Released by Pathé Exchange	Public Domain
July 17, 1927	Why Girls Love Sailors	Short	Released by Pathé Exchange	Public Domain
August 28, 1927	With Love and Hisses	Short	Released by Pathé Exchange; First Laurel and Hardy film where Hardy sports his iconic narrow mustache.	Public Domain
September 10, 1927	Sugar Daddies	Short		Public Domain
September 25, 1927	Sailors, Beware!	Short	Released by Pathé Exchange	Public Domain
October 5, 1927	Now I'll Tell One	Short	Partly lost film	Public Domain
October 8, 1927	The Second Hundred Years	Short	William K. Everson identifies this as the first "official" Laurel and Hardy film in which they are presented as a team	Public Domain
October 15, 1927	Call of the Cuckoo	Short	Laurel and Hardy and Charley Chase in supporting roles	Public Domain
November 5, 1927	Hats Off	Short	Lost film	Public Domain
November 20, 1927	Do Detectives Think?	Short	First film in which the duo appear in their standard costumes	Public Domain
December 3, 1927	Putting Pants on Philip	Short	Wes D. Gehring identifies this as their first "official" film together as a team	Public Domain
December 31, 1927	The Battle of the Century	Short	Once partly lost film, but found in 2015. Added to the National Film Registry in 2020.	Public Domain
January 28, 1928	Leave 'Em Laughing	Short		Public Domain
February 12, 1928	Flying Elephants	Short		Public Domain
February 25, 1928	The Finishing Touch	Short		Public Domain
March 24, 1928	From Soup to Nuts	Short		Public Domain
April 21, 1928	You're Darn Tootin'	Short		Public Domain
May 19, 1928	Their Purple Moment	Short		Public Domain
September 8, 1928	Should Married Men Go Home?	Short	The first Hal Roach film to bill Laurel and Hardy as a team. Previous appearances together were billed under the Roach "All-Star Comedy" banner.	Public Domain
October 6, 1928	Early to Bed	Short		Public Domain
November 3, 1928	Two Tars	Short		Public Domain
December 1, 1928	Habeas Corpus	Short	Sound (music and synchronized sound effects only)	Public Domain
December 29, 1928	We Faw Down	Short	Sound (music and synchronized sound effects only)	Public Domain
January 26, 1929	Liberty	Short	Sound (music and synchronized sound effects only)	Public Domain
February 23, 1929	Wrong Again	Short	Sound (music and synchronized sound effects only)	Public Domain
March 23, 1929	That's My Wife	Short	Sound (music and synchronized sound effects only)	Public Domain
April 29, 1929	Big Business	Short	Silent; Added to the National Film Registry in 1992.	Public Domain
May 4, 1929	Unaccustomed As We Are	Short	Sound (all-talking)	Public Domain
May 28, 1929	Double Whoopee	Short	Silent Features a notable early appearance by Jean Harlow	Public Domain
June 1, 1929	Berth Marks	Short	Sound (all-talking)	Public Domain
June 29, 1929	Men O' War	Short	Sound (all-talking)	Public Domain
August 10, 1929	Perfect Day	Short	Sound (all-talking)	Public Domain
September 21, 1929	They Go Boom!	Short	Sound (all-talking)	Public Domain
October 19, 1929	Bacon Grabbers	Short	Sound (music and synchronized sound effects only)	Public Domain
November 16, 1929	The Hoose-Gow	Short	Sound (all-talking)	Public Domain
November 29, 1929	The Hollywood Revue of 1929	Feature	Sound (all-talking); All-star revue produced by Metro-Goldwyn-Mayer; Nominated—Academy Award for Best Picture	Public Domain
December 14, 1929	Angora Love	Short	Sound (music and synchronized sound effects only)	Public Domain
January 4, 1930	Night Owls	Short		Public Domain
January 21, 1930	The Rogue Song	Feature	Operetta film produced by Metro-Goldwyn-Mayer with Laurel and Hardy in supporting roles Filmed in Technicolor; Partially lost	Public Domain
February 8, 1930	Blotto	Short	Three reels	Public Domain
March 22, 1930	Brats	Short		Public Domain
April 26, 1930	Below Zero	Short		Public Domain
May 31, 1930	Hog Wild	Short		Public Domain
September 6, 1930	The Laurel-Hardy Murder Case	Short	Three reels	Public Domain
November 29, 1930	Another Fine Mess	Short	Three reels Remake of Duck Soup	Public Domain
February 7, 1931	Be Big!	Short	Three reels	
February 21, 1931	Chickens Come Home	Short	Three reels Remake of Love 'Em and Weep	
April 1, 1931	The Stolen Jools	Short	Presented by National Variety Artists and released by Paramount; Cameo appearances by Laurel and Hardy	Public Domain
April 4, 1931	Laughing Gravy	Short		
May 16, 1931	Our Wife	Short		
August 15, 1931	Pardon Us	Feature		
September 19, 1931	Come Clean	Short		
October 31, 1931	One Good Turn	Short		
December 12, 1931	Beau Hunks	Short	Four reels	
December 26, 1931	On the Loose	Short	Stars ZaSu Pitts and Thelma Todd; Cameo appearances by Laurel and Hardy	
January 23, 1932	Helpmates	Short		
March 5, 1932	Any Old Port!	Short		
April 16, 1932	The Music Box	Short	Three reels Academy Award for Best Live Action Short Film; Added to the National Film Registry in 1997.	
May 21, 1932	The Chimp	Short	Three reels	
June 25, 1932	County Hospital	Short		
September 10, 1932	Scram!	Short		
September 23, 1932	Pack Up Your Troubles	Feature		
November 5, 1932	Their First Mistake	Short		
December 31, 1932	Towed in a Hole	Short		
February 25, 1933	Twice Two	Short		
April 22, 1933	Me and My Pal	Short		
May 5, 1933	The Devil's Brother	Feature	Based on the opera Fra Diavolo by Daniel Auber	
August 3, 1933	The Midnight Patrol	Short		
October 7, 1933	Busy Bodies	Short		
October 28, 1933	Wild Poses	Short	Our Gang film with cameo appearances by Laurel and Hardy	
November 25, 1933	Dirty Work	Short		
December 29, 1933	Sons of the Desert	Feature	Added to the National Film Registry in 2012.	
January 13, 1934	Oliver the Eighth	Short	Three reels	
June 1, 1934	Hollywood Party	Feature	A Metro-Goldwyn-Mayer production	
June 23, 1934	Going Bye-Bye!	Short		
July 21, 1934	Them Thar Hills	Short		
November 30, 1934	Babes in Toyland	Feature	Based on the operetta by Victor Herbert and Glen MacDonough; Reissued as March of the Wooden Soldiers, March of the Toys, and Revenge Is Sweet	Public Domain
December 11, 1934	The Live Ghost	Short		
January 5, 1935	Tit for Tat	Short	Nominated for the Academy Award for Best Live Action Short Film.	
February 26, 1935	The Fixer Uppers	Short		
August 6, 1935	Thicker than Water	Short		
August 23, 1935	Bonnie Scotland	Feature		
February 14, 1936	The Bohemian Girl	Feature	Adapted from the opera by Michael William Balfe and Alfred Bunn; With Darla Hood	
May 11, 1936	On the Wrong Trek	Short	Charley Chase comedy with cameo appearances by Laurel and Hardy	
October 30, 1936	Our Relations	Feature		
April 16, 1937	Way Out West	Feature		
May 21, 1937	Pick a Star	Feature	Cameo appearances by Laurel and Hardy	
May 20, 1938	Swiss Miss	Feature		
August 19, 1938	Block-Heads	Feature	Cameo appearance of Tommy Bond.	
October 20, 1939	The Flying Deuces	Feature	An RKO Radio Pictures production	Public Domain
February 16, 1940	A Chump at Oxford	Feature	Released by United Artists	
May 3, 1940	Saps at Sea	Feature	Released by United Artists	
October 10, 1941	Great Guns	Feature	A 20th Century Fox production	
August 7, 1942	A-Haunting We Will Go	Feature	A 20th Century Fox production	
November 19, 1942	The Tree in a Test Tube	Short	One-reel film (in color) produced by the United States Department of Agriculture. Laurel and Hardy, appearing in cameos, made this during the filming of Jitterbugs.	Public Domain
April 4, 1943	Air Raid Wardens	Feature	A Metro-Goldwyn-Mayer production	
June 11, 1943	Jitterbugs	Feature	A 20th Century Fox production	
November 1, 1943	The Dancing Masters	Feature	A 20th Century Fox production	
September 22, 1944	The Big Noise	Feature	A 20th Century Fox production	
December 6, 1944	Nothing but Trouble	Feature	A Metro-Goldwyn-Mayer production	
May 18, 1945	The Bullfighters	Feature	A 20th Century Fox production	
November 21, 1951	Atoll K	Feature	A co-production of Les Films Sirius (France), Franco-London Films (France), and Fortezza Films (Italy); released in the United Kingdom as Escapade; reissued in the United States as Robinson Crusoe-Land and Utopia	Public Domain

=== Foreign-language versions ===
During the early days of sound American motion picture companies often made foreign-language versions of their films. The following is a list of known foreign-language versions of Laurel and Hardy films.

Foreign language versions of short films
Year	English	French	German	Spanish	Italian	Esperanto
1930	Night Owls			Ladrones (Thieves)	Ladroni (Thieves); Currently lost	Ŝtelistoj (Thieves); Currently lost
1930	Blotto	Une Nuit Extravagante (An Extravagant Night)		La Vida Nocturna (The Night Life)		
1930	Brats	Les bons petits diables (Good Little Devils); Currently lost	Glückliche Kindheit (Happy Childhood); Currently lost	Dos Buenos Chicos (Two Good Boys); Currently lost		
1930	Below Zero			Tiembla y Titubea (Shivering and Shaking)		
1930	Hog Wild	Pêle-mêle (Pell-Mell); Currently lost		Radiomanía (Radio Mania); Currently lost		
1930	Berth Marks and The Laurel-Hardy Murder Case	Feu mon oncle (My Late Uncle); Currently lost	Spuk um Mitternacht (in Germany) Drei Millionen Dollar (lost version in Austria) (Haunting at Midnight)	Noche de Duendes (Night of the Goblins)		
1931	Be Big! and Laughing Gravy	Les Carottiers (The Chiselers)		Los Calaveras (The Skulls)		
1931	Chickens Come Home			Politiquerias (Playing at Politics)		

Foreign language versions of feature film
Year	English	French	German	Spanish	Italian
1931	Pardon Us	Sous Les Verrous (Under the Locks); Currently lost	Hinter Schloss und Riegel (Under Lock and Key); Only a handful of clips survive	De Bote En Bote (From Cell to Cell)	Muraglie (Walls); Currently lost

Note: A lost German-language version of The Hollywood Revue of 1929, Wir Schalten um auf Hollywood (We Switch to Hollywood), was made and released in 1931. Apparently Laurel and Hardy do not appear in it.

=== Promotional film ===
Release date	Title	Notes
1936	Galaxy of Stars	A promotional short film released by Metro-Goldwyn-Mayer only for MGM exhibitors in Europe and Africa, featuring Laurel and Hardy. Rediscovered in 2005.

=== Compilation films ===
Release date	Title	Notes
1957	The Golden Age of Comedy	* Written, produced, and directed by Robert Youngson. * Narrated by Dwight Weist and Ward Wilson. * Features clips from The Second Hundred Years (1927), The Battle of the Century (1927), You're Darn Tootin' (1928), Two Tars (1928), We Faw Down (1928), and Double Whoopee (1929).
1960	When Comedy Was King	* Written, produced, and directed by Robert Youngson. * Narrated by Dwight Weist. * Features clips from Big Business (1929).
1961	Days of Thrills and Laughter	* Written, produced, and directed by Robert Youngson. * Narrated by Jay Jackson.
1963	30 Years of Fun	* Written, produced, and directed by Robert Youngson. * Features clips from The Lucky Dog (1921).
1964	The Big Parade of Comedy	* Written, produced, and directed by Robert Youngson. * Narrated by Les Tremayne. * Features clips from Hollywood Party (1934) and Bonnie Scotland (1935). * Also known as M.G.M.'s Big Parade of Comedy.
1965	Laurel and Hardy's Laughing 20's	* Written, produced, and directed by Robert Youngson. * Narrated by Jay Jackson. * Features clips from Thicker than Water (1935), 45 Minutes from Hollywood (1926), Sugar Daddies (1927), The Second Hundred Years (1927), Call of the Cuckoo (1927), Putting Pants on Philip (1927), The Battle of the Century (1927), Leave 'Em Laughing (1928), The Finishing Touch (1928), From Soup to Nuts (1928), You're Darn Tootin' (1928), Two Tars (1928), Habeas Corpus (1928), We Faw Down (1928), Liberty (1929), Wrong Again (1929), and Double Whoopee (1929).
1966	The Crazy World of Laurel and Hardy	* Written by Bill Scott. * Produced by Hal Roach, Jr., Raymond Rohauer, and Jay Ward. * Narrated by Garry Moore. * Features clips from Perfect Day (1929), Bacon Grabbers (1929), The Hoose-Gow (1929), Blotto (1930), Hog Wild (1930), Chickens Come Home (1931), Come Clean (1931), Beau Hunks (1931), Helpmates (1932), Any Old Port! (1932), The Music Box (1932), Towed in a Hole (1932), Me and My Pal (1933), Busy Bodies (1933), Dirty Work (1933), Sons of the Desert (1933), Going Bye-Bye! (1934), Thicker than Water (1935), The Bohemian Girl (1936), Way Out West (1937), Swiss Miss (1938), and Block-Heads (1938).
1967	The Further Perils of Laurel and Hardy	* Written, produced, and directed by Robert Youngson. * Narrated by Jay Jackson. * Features clips from Sugar Daddies (1927), The Second Hundred Years (1927), Do Detectives Think? (1927), Leave 'Em Laughing (1928), Flying Elephants (1928), You're Darn Tootin' (1928), Should Married Men Go Home? (1928), Early to Bed (1928), Habeas Corpus (1928), That's My Wife (1929), and Angora Love (1929).
1969	The Best of Laurel and Hardy	* Produced and directed by James L. Wolcott. * Features clips from Night Owls (1930), Below Zero (1930), Be Big! (1931), Laughing Gravy (1931), Our Wife (1931), Pardon Us (1931), One Good Turn (1931), County Hospital (1932), Their First Mistake (1932), The Live Ghost (1934), and Our Relations (1936).
1970	4 Clowns	* Written, produced, and directed by Robert Youngson. * Narrated by Jay Jackson. * Features clips from The Second Hundred Years (1927), Putting Pants on Philip (1927), Big Business (1929), Double Whoopee (1929), Two Tars (1928), and Their Purple Moment (1928).
