= Baldwin Cooke =

American actor (1888–1953)

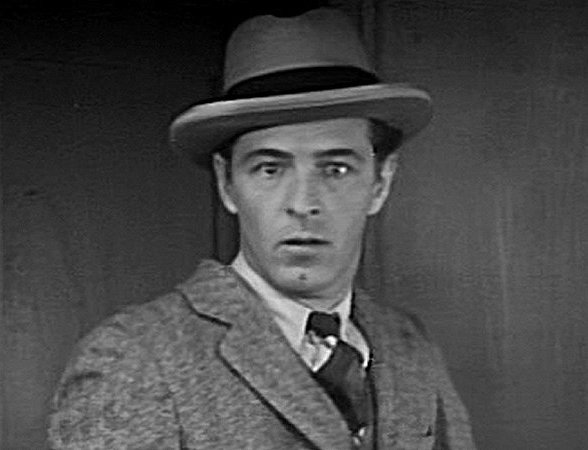

Baldwin Gardiner Cooke (March 10, 1888 – December 31, 1953), also known as Baldy Cooke, was a comedic American actor. Born in New York, Cooke and his wife, Alice, toured in vaudeville with Stan Laurel, remaining close friends over the years. He appeared in some thirty Laurel and Hardy comedies. Cooke also appeared in the Our Gang series, and supported Charley Chase in 1931's La Señorita de Chicago. His grave is located at Valhalla Memorial Park Cemetery where Laurel's co-star, Oliver Hardy is interred.

== Selected filmography ==
- Two Tars (1928, Short) - Motorist
- Election Day (1929, Short) - Gangster
- Berth Marks (1929, Short) - Train Passenger (uncredited)
- Men O' War (1929, Short) - Boater (uncredited)
- Perfect Day (1929, Short) - Next-door Neighbor
- The Girl in the Show (1929) - Railroad Ticket Seller (uncredited)
- The Hoose-Gow (1929, Short) - Prisoner (uncredited)
- Night Owls (1930, Short) - Policeman (uncredited)
- Blotto (1930, Short) - Waiter (uncredited)
- The Big Kick (1930, Short) - Minor Role (uncredited)
- Le joueur de golf (1930) - (uncredited)
- Below Zero (1930, Short) - Man at Window (uncredited)
- Fast Work (1930, Short) - Insane Asylum Attendant (uncredited)
- Teacher's Pet (1930, Short) - First Caterer (uncredited)
- Noche de duendes (1930) - Un pasajero (uncredited)
- High C's (1930, Short) - Courier Delivering Message
- Be Big! (1931, Short) - Cookie (uncredited)
- Chickens Come Home (1931, Short) - Office Worker (uncredited)
- The Pip from Pittsburgh (1931, Short) - Newspaper Reader (uncredited)
- La Señorita de Chicago (1931, Short) - Night Club Patron Reading Newspaper (uncredited)
- Rough Seas (1931, Short) - Pvt. Cooke (uncredited)
- Bargain Day (1931, Short) - Sox customer
- Pardon Us (1931) - Insurgent Convict (uncredited)
- Call a Cop! (1931, Short) - Detective (uncredited)
- One Good Turn (1931, Short) - Minor Role (uncredited)
- Dogs Is Dogs (1931, Short) - Driver (uncredited)
- Beau Hunks (1931, Short) - New Recruit (uncredited)
- Any Old Port! (1932, Short) - Spectator (uncredited)
- Choo-Choo! (1932, Short) - Extra on train
- The Chimp (1932, Short) - Minor Role (uncredited)
- The Pooch (1932, Short) - Diner Attendant
- County Hospital (1932, Short) - Orderly (uncredited)
- Young Ironsides (1932, Short) - Dining Car Steward (uncredited)
- Scram! (1932, Short) - Court Recorder (uncredited)
- Pack Up Your Troubles (1932) - Doughboy (uncredited)
- Fish Hooky (1933, Short) - Amusement park barker
- Twice Two (1933, Short) - Soda Jerk (uncredited)
- Luncheon at Twelve (1933, Short) - Baldy, a Neighbor (uncredited)
- Sons of the Desert (1933) - Man Introducing Steamship Official / Sons Convention Attendee (uncredited)
- Hollywood Party (1934) - Doorman (uncredited)
- Another Wild Idea (1934, Short) - Radio Man (uncredited)
- Going Bye-Bye! (1934, Short) - Court Official (uncredited)
- It Happened One Day (1934, Short) - Baldy - Office Clerk (uncredited)
- Them Thar Hills (1934, Short) - Officer (uncredited)
- Death on the Diamond (1934) - Cardinal Player (uncredited)
- Babes in Toyland (1934) - Policeman (uncredited)
- The Live Ghost (1934, Short) - Sailor (uncredited)
- Tit for Tat (1935, Short) - Customer (uncredited)
- Okay Toots! (1935, Short) - Office Worker (uncredited)
- Thicker than Water (1935, Short) - Hospital Visitor (uncredited)
- Manhattan Monkey Business (1935, Short) - Diner in French Restaurant (uncredited)
- The Bohemian Girl (1936) - Soldier (uncredited)
- Neighborhood House (1936) - Irate Moviegoer (uncredited)
- Kelly the Second (1936) - Hungry Diner (uncredited)
- Our Relations (1936) - Bartender / Denker's Beer Garden Customer (uncredited)
- The Longest Night (1936) - Policeman (uncredited)
- Let's Make a Million (1936) - Farley
- After the Thin Man (1936) - Photographer (uncredited)
- SOS Coast Guard (1937, Serial) - Seaman (uncredited)
- Trouble at Midnight (1937) - Farmer (uncredited)
- Swiss Miss (1938) - Alpen Hotel Atmosphere Man (uncredited)
- The Chaser (1938) - Second Bus Driver (uncredited)
- Auto Antics (1939, Short) - Luke
- The Night of Nights (1939) - Waiter (uncredited)
- Of Mice and Men (1939) - Ranch Hand (uncredited)
- I Take This Woman (1940) - Steward (scenes deleted)
- Millionaires in Prison (1940) - Mess Hall Trustee (uncredited)
- Nazi Agent (1942) - Waiter (uncredited)
- Ship Ahoy (1942) - Steward (uncredited) (final film role)
