= Angora Love =

1929 American silent film

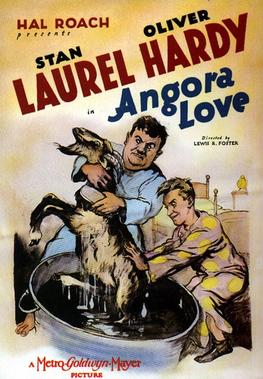
- Directed by: Lewis R. Foster
- Written by: Leo McCarey (story); H.M. Walker (titles)
- Produced by: Hal Roach
- Starring: Stan Laurel; Oliver Hardy; Harry Bernard; Charlie Hall; Edgar Kennedy; Charley Young
- Cinematography: George Stevens
- Edited by: Richard C. Currier
- Distributed by: Metro-Goldwyn-Mayer
- Release date: December 14, 1929
- Running time: 21 minutes
- Countries: United States; United Kingdom; Canada
- Languages: Synchronized Sound; English (Intertitles)

Angora Love is a 1929 synchronized sound short subject comedy film starring Laurel and Hardy, released on December 14, 1929. While the film has no audible dialog, it was released with a synchronized organ musical score with sound effects. This would prove to be the last Laurel and Hardy film to be released without any audible dialog.

== Plot ==
Angora Love (1929)

Laurel and Hardy encounter a wandering goat that becomes attached to them subsequent to their benevolent act of offering it doughnuts. The goat persistently trails them, necessitating its accommodation within their apartment. However, their attempts to conceal the animal from their landlord prove ineffectual, leading to escalating tensions and confrontations.

The situation escalates to a climax marked by a water altercation involving Stan, Ollie, the landlord, a fellow tenant, and a law enforcement officer. As the conflict unfolds, the policeman intervenes, resulting in the arrest of the landlord. Stan and Ollie emerge from the altercation seemingly triumphant. At least until the goat crawls out from under the bed, accompanied by several baby goats.

== Cast ==
- Stan Laurel as Stan
- Oliver Hardy as Ollie
- Harry Bernard as Policeman
- Charlie Hall as Neighbor
- Edgar Kennedy as Landlord
- Charley Young as Mr. Caribeau

== Production notes ==
Angora Love was Laurel and Hardy's final silent film. It was released late in 1929 when most Hollywood studios had fully converted to sound productions. Several jokes would be recycled in Laughing Gravy and The Chimp. The foot rubbing gag was re-used in Beau Hunks.

== See also ==
- Laurel and Hardy filmography
