= Jack Hill (actor) =

American actor (1887–1963)

- Born: Lawrence Young Hill; September 12, 1887; Roanoke, Virginia, U.S.
- Died: November 22, 1963 (aged 76); Woodland Hills, California, California, U.S.
- Resting place: Chapel of the Pines Crematory, Glendale, California
- Occupation: Actor
- Years active: 1922–1950
- Spouses: Reba Lucas Roberts (m. 1929–1989) Ethel Violet Henrickson (née Frostrom) (m. 1941) Freda Wilhelmina Johnson (m. 1949)

Jack Hill (born Lawrence Young Hill; September 12, 1887 – November 22, 1963) was an American film actor and stuntman, who appeared in scores of Laurel & Hardy comedies.

== Early life and career ==
A native of Roanoke, Virginia, Hill was on the middle child of three born to Dr. John Peter Hill and Arkansas Missouri Paxton.

Hill had a prominent roles in early Our Gang shorts, such as A Quiet Street, portraying the film's villain, "Red Mike," a thief who easily eludes capture by the film's Keystone-ish cops only to find he's gotten more than he bargained for when pitted against the Gang's relentless protector, Pete the Dog.

By the final decade of his career, Hill had, by his own account, transitioned to working primarily as a stuntman and stunt double.

== Personal life and death ==
On October 3, 1929, Hill married Reba Lucas Roberts; they divorced on August 20, 1937. On September 4, 1941, he wed Ethel Violet Henrickson (née Frostrom). From 1949 until his death, Hill was married to Freda Wilhelmina Johnson.

On Friday, November 22, 1963, Hill died at the Motion Picture Country Hospital. His remains are interred at Chapel of the Pines Crematory.

== Selected filmography ==
- A Quiet Street (1922, Short) - Red Mike (uncredited)
- Back Stage (1923, Short) - Audience member
- Dogs of War! (1923, Short) - Officer
- Stage Fright (1923, Short) - Audience member
- The Fighting Demon (1925) - Professor
- Good Cheer (1926, Short) - Pedestrian
- 45 Minutes from Hollywood (1926, Short) - Hotel Guest (uncredited)
- The Glorious Fourth (1927, Short) - Man with monocle
- Sugar Daddies (1927, Short) - Hotel Extra #1
- Putting Pants on Philip (1927, Short)
- The Battle of the Century (1927, Short) - Ringside Spectator (uncredited)
- Playin' Hookey (1928, Short) - Keystone-ish cop
- Leave 'Em Laughing (1928, Short) - Irate Motorist (uncredited)
- Speedy (1928) - Minor Role (uncredited)
- Their Purple Moment (1928, Short) - Doorman / Pink Pub Patron (uncredited)
- Should Married Men Go Home? (1928, Short) - Muddy Combatant (uncredited)
- Two Tars (1928, Short) - Motorist with Mattress
- Election Day (1929, Short) - Gangster
- Liberty (1929, Short) - Officer
- Wrong Again (1929, Short) - Man on Buckboard
- Movie Night (1929, Short) - Movie Patron (uncredited)
- Railroadin' (1929, Short) - Grocery Truck Driver (uncredited)
- Leaping Love (1929, Short) - Minor Role (uncredited)
- Cat, Dog & Co. (1929, Short) - Pedestrian (uncredited)
- Blotto (1930, Short) - Man in Rainbow Club (uncredited)
- Le joueur de golf (1930) - (uncredited)
- La Vida nocturna (1930, Short) - Minor Role (uncredited)
- Below Zero (1930, Short) - Busboy (uncredited)
- Une nuit extravagante (1930, Short)
- Pups Is Pups (1930, Short) - Man in Crowd (uncredited)
- Be Big! (1931, Short) - Railway Station Passerby (uncredited)
- The Stolen Jools (1931, Short) - Policeman
- Pardon Us (1931) - Insurgent Convict (uncredited)
- Shiver My Timbers (1931, Short) - Pirate
- Beau Hunks (1931, Short) - Riffian (uncredited)
- The Kick-Off! (1931, Short) - Minor Role (uncredited)
- On the Loose (1931, Short) - Fun House Worker (uncredited)
- Any Old Port! (1932, Short) - Spectator (uncredited)
- The Chimp (1932, Short) - Circus Audience Member (uncredited)
- Pack Up Your Troubles (1932) - New Recruit / Pedestrian (uncredited)
- Free Wheeling (1932, Short) - Police Officer
- A Lad an' a Lamp (1932, Short) - Audience Member / Officer
- The Devil's Brother (1933) - Brigand (uncredited)
- Busy Bodies (1933, Short) - Shop Worker (uncredited)
- Elmer Steps Out (1934, Short)
- Fishing for Trouble (1934, Short)
- Back to the Soil (1934, Short)
- Treasure Island (1934) - Pirate (uncredited)
- Babes in Toyland (1934) - Townsman (uncredited)
- The Chases of Pimple Street (1934, Short) - Chase's Double (uncredited)
- Tit for Tat (1935, Short) - Passerby (uncredited)
- The Fixer Uppers (1935, Short) - Policeman (uncredited)
- Southern Exposure (1935, Short) - Juryman (uncredited)
- Stolen Harmony (1935) - Cop (uncredited)
- Bonnie Scotland (1935) - Hotel Lobby Guest / Newly Drafted Soldier / Native Henchman (uncredited)
- Millions in the Air (1935) - Motor Cop (uncredited)
- Divot Diggers (1936, Short) - Golfer
- The Bohemian Girl (1936) - Soldier (uncredited)
- The Lucky Corner (1936, Short) - Crowd extra
- On the Wrong Trek (1936, Short) - Bit Part (uncredited)
- Our Relations (1936) - Pirate's Club Customer (uncredited)
- General Spanky (1936) - Minor Role (uncredited)
- Way Out West (1937) - Finn's Employee (uncredited)
- Pick a Star (1937) - Minor Role (uncredited)
- Swiss Miss (1938) - Townsman (uncredited)
- Block-Heads (1938) - Soldier in Trenches (uncredited)
- Topper Takes a Trip (1938) - Policeman in Bank (uncredited)
- Mooching Through Georgia (1939, Short) - Union Officer (uncredited)
- Saps at Sea (1940) - Man Beneath Auto (uncredited)
- Land of the Lawless (1947) - Barfly (uncredited)
- Backfire (1950) - Cop at Shootout (uncredited) (final film role)

== Book sources ==
- Braff, Richard E. (2002). The Braff Silent Short Film Working Papers : Over 25,000 Films, 1903-1929, Alphabetized and Indexed. McFarland & Company. ISBN 0786410310.
