= Bacon Grabbers =

1929 film

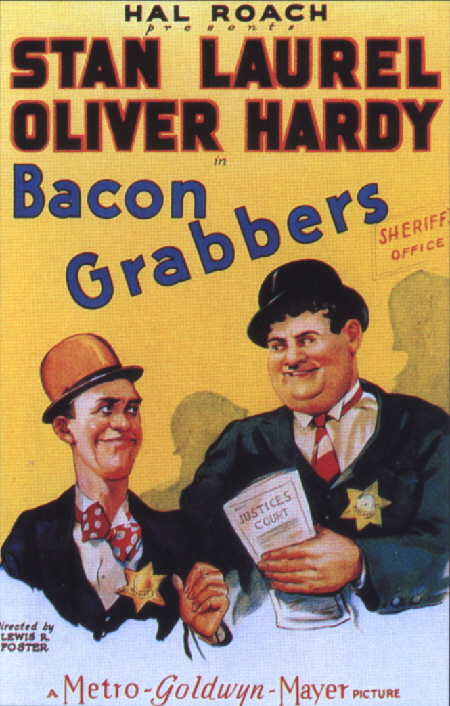
- Theatrical poster for Bacon Grabbers (1929)
- Directed by: Lewis R. Foster
- Written by: Leo McCarey; H.M. Walker
- Produced by: Hal Roach
- Starring: Stan Laurel; Oliver Hardy
- Cinematography: George Stevens
- Edited by: Richard C. Currier
- Distributed by: Metro-Goldwyn-Mayer
- Release date: October 19, 1929
- Running time: 20 minutes
- Country: United States
- Languages: Synchronized Sound; English (Intertitles)

Bacon Grabbers is a 1929 synchronized sound short subject comedy film starring Laurel and Hardy. While the film has no audible dialog, it was released with a synchronized organ musical score with sound effects.

== Plot ==
Bacon Grabbers (1929)

Laurel and Hardy are employed as repossession men for the local sheriff's office. They are given the challenging task of repossessing a radio owned by Collis P. Kennedy, described as a tough customer, who has not paid any installments since 1921. Kennedy first chases Laurel and Hardy off his property with a toy bulldog. Then he barricades himself in his home, thwarting all efforts by the repo men to enter and recover the radio. When a wayward rifle shot by Kennedy knocks the top off a nearby fire hydrant and soaks a policeman, the cop investigates. Laurel and Hardy, with the officer's assistance, are finally permitted to enter Kennedy's house and take the radio. It is abandoned in the street, however, while Kennedy and the repo men exchange kicks. A steamroller from a construction site comes along and flattens the unattended radio. Moments later, Mrs. Kennedy arrives and happily tells her husband that she has paid the outstanding debt. The radio—now in pieces—is theirs. As Laurel and Hardy both laugh at Kennedy's misfortune, the steamroller returns and flattens their car too.

== Cast ==
- Stan Laurel - Stan
- Oliver Hardy - Ollie
- Edgar Kennedy - Collis P. Kennedy
- Jean Harlow - Mrs. Kennedy
- Harry Bernard - Policeman
- Eddie Baker - Sheriff
- Bobby Dunn - Man on building site
- Charlie Hall - Truck driver
- Sam Lufkin - Man in sheriff's hat

== Notes ==
Jean Harlow, who was given star billing, appears on the screen as Mrs. Kennedy for only about 30 seconds at the end of the movie.

The title Bacon Grabbers was 1920s slang for "repo men."

The movie was filmed at 2980 Haddington Drive and 10341 Bannockburn Drive in Cheviot Hills, Los Angeles.
