= Laughing Gravy =

1931 film

- Title card
- Directed by: James W. Horne
- Written by: H. M. Walker; Stan Laurel (uncredited)
- Produced by: Hal Roach
- Starring: Stan Laurel; Oliver Hardy
- Cinematography: Art Lloyd
- Edited by: Richard C. Currier
- Music by: Leroy Shield
- Distributed by: Metro-Goldwyn-Mayer
- Release date: April 4, 1931
- Running time: 20 minutes (original release); 31:38 (English); 62:29 (Spanish); 29:54 (German); 64:45 (French)
- Countries: United States; United Kingdom; Canada
- Languages: English; Spanish; German; French

Laughing Gravy is a 1931 short film comedy starring Laurel and Hardy. It was directed by James W. Horne, produced by Hal Roach and distributed by Metro-Goldwyn-Mayer.

== Plot ==
Stan and Ollie are in bed when Stan’s hiccups wake up Ollie. Oliver, after suffering in silence for a few moments, wakes up Stan. Stan clownishly drinks a glass of water and tries to return to sleep, only to wake the dog, whose barking rouses their landlord. The landlord ejects the dog, and Stan resolves to rescue it. Ollie insists on doing it, as Stan will wake up the landlord. Ollie succeeds in finding Laughing Gravy, only to be locked out of the building. This basic scenario is repeated several times, resulting in Ollie falling into a frozen barrel of rainwater, locking himself out of the apartment window and climbing down and destroying the brick chimney.

The boys are to be evicted from the apartment when Stan receives a letter, along with a $1,000 check, informing him that he has inherited his uncle's fortune on the condition that he ceases all contact with Oliver. At first, Stan doesn’t show Ollie the letter, until Oliver guilts Stan into sharing it. With Oliver’s blessing, Stan prepares to leave forever. At the last moment, however, Stan tears apart the letter and returns to Oliver, who thinks that Stan sacrificed the money for him, but Stan tells him that he did it for his dog.

Just before Stan and Ollie are evicted, a policeman informs them that the house is quarantined for two months, with nobody permitted to leave. The frustrated landlord walks away with a rifle, and a shot and the sound of the landlord's body hitting on the floor are heard. The three slowly and sadly take off their hats and the policeman closes the door.

== Cast ==
- Stan Laurel as Stan
- Oliver Hardy as Ollie
- Charlie Hall as The Landlord
- Harry Bernard as The Policeman
- Charles Dorety as Drunk
- Laughing Gravy as Laughing Gravy - the Dog (uncredited)

== Production notes ==
Laughing Gravy is a remake of the Laurel and Hardy 1929 silent film Angora Love. Charlie Hall plays a tenant in the original and the landlord in the remake. Harry Bernard also plays the policeman in Angora Love as he does in Laughing Gravy. The film was partially remade in 1932 as The Chimp.

The eponymous dog's name is a slang reference to liquor, as Prohibition was still in effect in the U.S. when the film was made.

=== Alternative versions ===
Laughing Gravy has three versions: a two-reel black-and-white version lasting approximately 20 minutes, a three-reel black-and-white version lasting approximately 30 minutes and a three-reel colorized version that finishes with the two-reel ending.

There are also two "feature" versions in French and Spanish in which Laughing Gravy follows the events of Be Big!, and with a title card stating that Laurel and Hardy were divorced by their wives for what happened and wind up in the dingy rooming house.

The three-reel version was the original one, as Hal Roach had tried to switch to the three-reel format for Laurel and Hardy shorts, starting with The Laurel-Hardy Murder Case. Just after it was completed, MGM asked Roach to limit short films to two reels, and an alternative ending was filmed. The three-reel version had already been previewed, and a work print was rediscovered in 1985.

The two-reel version and the first two reels of the three-reel version are identical except that the two-reel version ends with the landlord committing suicide when, with his residence quarantined, he is unable to evict Stanley and Ollie. In the three-reel version, Stanley receives a telegram just before they are evicted informing him that he is to inherit a vast fortune, but only if he leaves Ollie behind forever.

=== Foreign versions ===
Laughing Gravy was filmed in two extended foreign-language versions immediately upon completion of its English version. These foreign versions combined the story of the English original with that of Be Big!, another short from the same year.

Les carottiers is the title of the extended French version; it replaces Isabelle Keith with Germaine de Neel as Mrs. Hardy, and Jean De Briac in Baldwin Cooke's role of Cookie. The Spanish version, Los Calaveras, features Linda Loredo as Mrs. Hardy.

Laurel and Hardy delivered their French and Spanish lines phonetically from cue cards. In the preceding Be Big!, Anita Garvin played Mrs. Laurel in all three films; she mouthed her foreign lines phonetically, on-camera but off-mic, while a voice actress just off-camera spoke into a "hot" mic.
