= Me and My Pal =

Me and My Pal may refer to:

- Me and My Pal (1933 film), an American short comedy film starring Laurel and Hardy
- Me and My Pal (1939 film), a British comedy film starring Dave Willis and Patricia Kirkwood
