= Habeas Corpus (1928 film) =

1928 short film by Ray McCarey and James Parrott

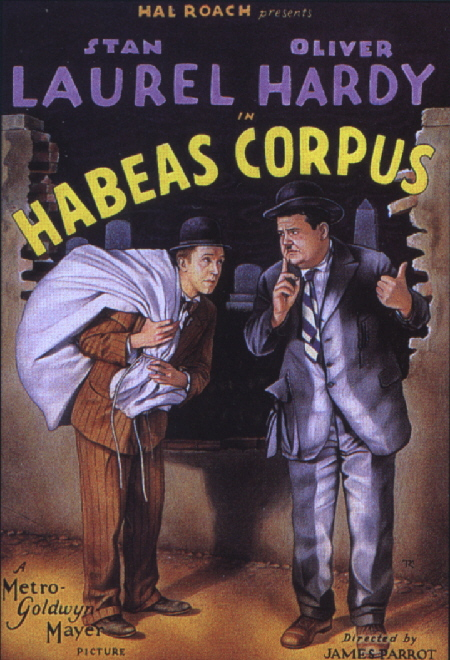
- Theatrical release poster
- Directed by: Leo McCarey; James Parrott
- Written by: Leo McCarey; James Parrott; H. M. Walker
- Produced by: Hal Roach
- Starring: Stan Laurel; Oliver Hardy; Richard Carle; Charles A. Bachman; Charley Rogers
- Cinematography: Len Powers
- Edited by: Richard C. Currier
- Distributed by: Metro-Goldwyn-Mayer
- Release date: December 1, 1928
- Running time: 20 minutes
- Country: United States
- Languages: Synchronized Sound; English (Intertitles)

Habeas Corpus is a synchronized sound short subject comedy film co-directed by Leo McCarey and James Parrott starring comedy duo Laurel and Hardy. While the film has no audible dialog, it was released with a synchronized orchestral musical score with sound effects. It was released by Metro-Goldwyn-Mayer on December 1, 1928. This film is importantly historically as the first Laurel and Hardy film to be released with recorded sound.

== Plot ==
A mad scientist named Professor Padilla captures the attention of law enforcement agencies with his nefarious intentions, particularly his plan to conduct a medical experiment using a deceased body. During a mealtime discussion revolving around the theory of the human brain's structure, Professor Padilla's residence is unexpectedly visited by Stan and Ollie, who coincidentally seek sustenance. Capitalizing on the moment, the professor offers the duo $500 to procure a cadaver from a nearby cemetery, a proposition met with initial incredulity but ultimately accepted by Stan and Ollie. Unbeknownst to them, the professor's butler, who is an undercover policeman, eavesdrops on their conversation and promptly alerts his superior. Acting on this information, the police apprehend the professor.

Simultaneously, Stan and Ollie's endeavors at the cemetery unfold in a series of unwitting missteps as they attempt to access the premises and unearth a fresh grave. Meanwhile, Ledoux, disguised within a white sack, clandestinely infiltrates the grave. When Stan and Ollie retrieve what they believe to be the pilfered corpse, Ledoux's presence is revealed as his legs protrude through the sack. Realizing their mistake, Stan and Ollie flee in a panic, ultimately culminating in Ollie and Ledoux's descent into a deep, water-filled pit.

== Cast ==
- Stan Laurel as Stan
- Oliver Hardy as Ollie
- Richard Carle as Professor Padilla
- Charley Rogers as Ledoux
- Charles A. Bachman as Detective
- Leo Sulky as Detective on telephone

== Production notes ==
Habeas Corpus was filmed on July 16–24 and 30–31, 1928. Although technically a silent film — having intertitles and no synchronized dialogue — it was the inaugural Hal Roach film released with a synchronized music and sounds effects track for theatres wired for sound. The Victor sound discs were thought lost until a set surfaced in the 1990s and was reunited with the film elements.

The concept of men trolling through a cemetery with a dead body was reworked by The Three Stooges in Three Pests in a Mess (1945).

== Reception ==
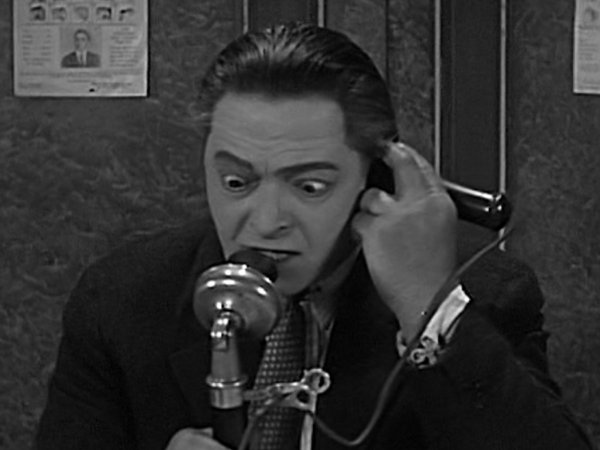
Leo Sulky as Detective on telephone

Horror film author Christopher Workman commented, "One sequence involving the comedy team's attempts to get over the graveyard wall takes up entirely too much running time and mires the proceedings in excessive tedium. Comedic incidents accumulate until the film has reached the requisite running time".

== See also ==
- Laurel and Hardy films
