= 4 Clowns =

1970 film

- Theatrical poster
- Directed by: Robert Youngson
- Written by: Robert Youngson
- Produced by: Robert Youngson
- Starring: Stan Laurel; Oliver Hardy; Charley Chase; Buster Keaton
- Narrated by: Jay Jackson
- Music by: Manny Albam; Angelo Ross (composer)
- Production company: Robert Youngson Productions
- Distributed by: 20th Century Fox
- Release date: September 1970
- Running time: 97 minutes
- Country: United States
- Language: English

4 Clowns is a 1970 documentary compilation film written and directed by Robert Youngson that studies the golden age of comedy through a compilation of rare silent film footage of the works of Stan Laurel, Oliver Hardy, Charley Chase and Buster Keaton. It was the last feature film project of producer, director, and writer Robert Youngson.

== Synopsis ==
The film is divided into three sections. The first section deals with early silent film works of Laurel and Hardy prior to the two becoming a team as well as their later work as a team. The second section deals with the career of Charley Chase. The third section deals with Buster Keaton. The film is a compilation of excerpts from some of these actors' more notable projects.

== Films excerpted ==
- His Day Out (1918)
- The Hobo (1917)
- No Man's Law (1927)
- Kill or Cure (1923)
- The Second Hundred Years (1927)
- Big Business (1929)
- Double Whoopee (1929)
- Putting Pants on Philip (1927)
- Two Tars (1928)
- Their Purple Moment (1928)
- Us (1927)
- What Price Goofy? (1925)
- Movie Night (1929)
- Limousine Love (1928)
- Seven Chances (1925)

== Cast ==
Narrated by Jay Jackson, the film concentrates on the works of Stan Laurel, Oliver Hardy, Charley Chase, and Buster Keaton.

Also seen in the excerpted films are actors Jean Arthur, Lori Bara, T. Roy Barnes, Bartine Burkett, Rosalind Byrne, Erwin Connelly, Jules Cowles, Doris Deane, Hazel Deane, Kay Deslys, Ruth Dwyer, Snitz Edwards, Connie Evans, Edith Fellows, Anita Garvin, Eugenia Gilbert, Charlie Hall, Edna Hammon, Marion Harlan, Jean C. Havez, Leatrice Joy, Edgar Kennedy, Barbara Kent, Judy King, Lucien Littlefield, Edna Marion, Billy Quirk, Frances Raymond, Viola Richard, Constance Talmadge, Pauline Toller, Billy West, and Noah Young.

== Post-production ==
After Robert Youngson completed 4 Clowns, distribution rights were acquired by 20th Century-Fox in May 1970, and a release date was set. After its 1970 release, the film also aired commercially in the United Kingdom in 1992 and 1995 on Channel Four.

== Reception ==
Leonard Maltin stated that the film was one of the best of Robert Youngson's compilations, and as it contained excerpts from "some of the best silent comedy ever", it was "a must for viewers of all ages."

== See also ==
- List of American films of 1970
