= Their First Mistake =

1932 film

- Directed by: George Marshall
- Written by: H.M. Walker
- Produced by: Hal Roach
- Starring: Stan Laurel; Oliver Hardy
- Cinematography: Art Lloyd
- Edited by: Richard C. Currier
- Music by: Marvin Hatley; Leroy Shield
- Release date: November 5, 1932
- Running time: 21 minutes
- Country: United States
- Language: English

Their First Mistake is a 1932 American pre-Code comedy short starring Laurel and Hardy. Directed by George Marshall, the film was produced by Hal Roach and distributed by Metro-Goldwyn-Mayer.

== Plot ==
Mrs. Hardy is annoyed that her husband Oliver seems to spend more time with his friend Stanley than with her. After a furious argument, Mrs. Hardy says that she will leave him if Ollie goes out with Stan again. Stan suggests that Ollie adopts a baby, which he does. Unfortunately, his wife has left their apartment on returning, and a process server delivers a paper informing Ollie that she is suing him for divorce, naming Stan as co-respondent. The boys are now left to look after the infant on their own.

Needing to replace a light bulb, Stan somehow uses one that blinks on and off with the neon sign outside their window. This causes Hardy to take several nasty falls in the suddenly dark room. Sleepily shoving a baby bottle at the infant, Ollie discovers Stan sucking on the nipple instead and having a wonderful time.

== Cast ==
- Stan Laurel as Stan
- Oliver Hardy as Ollie
- Mae Busch as Mrs. Arabella Hardy
- Billy Gilbert as Process Server
