= Below Zero (1930 film) =

1930 film

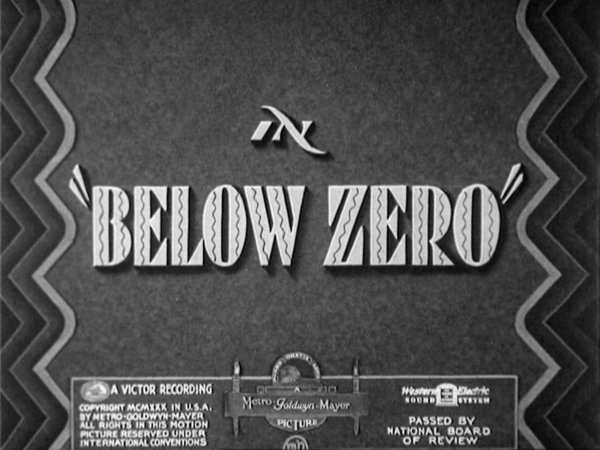
- Directed by: James Parrott
- Written by: H.M. Walker
- Produced by: Hal Roach
- Starring: Stan Laurel; Oliver Hardy
- Cinematography: George Stevens
- Edited by: Richard C. Currier
- Distributed by: Metro-Goldwyn-Mayer
- Release date: April 26, 1930
- Running time: 20:28 (English); 27:04 (Spanish)
- Country: United States
- Language: English

Below Zero is a 1930 short film starring Laurel and Hardy, directed by James Parrott and produced by Hal Roach.

== Plot ==
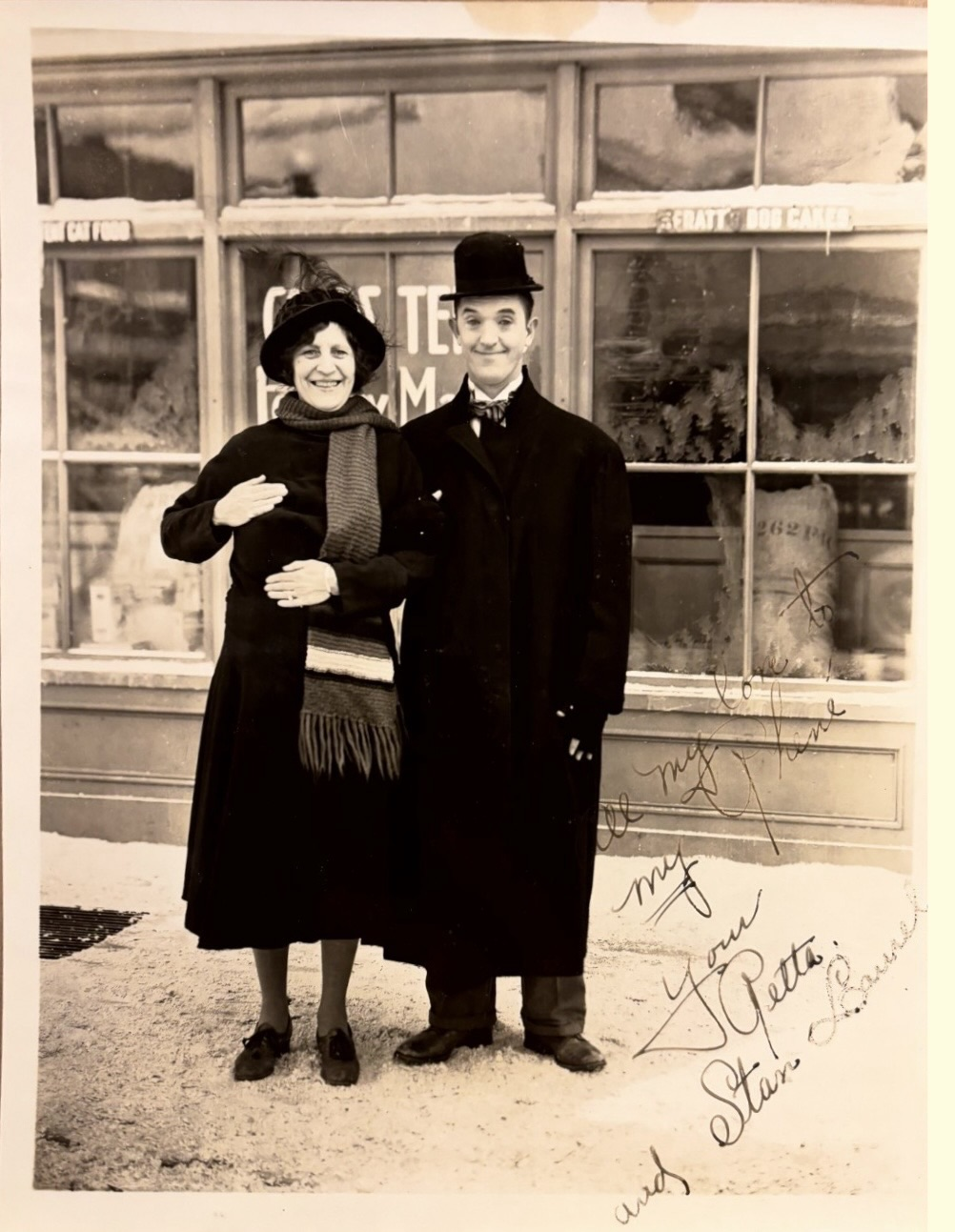
Retta Palmer and Stan Laurel on set

On a wintry day, Laurel and Hardy's attempts to earn money as street musicians prove futile, exacerbated by their unwitting performance in front of an Institute for the Deaf. Their renditions, including the nostalgic melody "In the Good Old Summer Time," elicit little response from passersby. Their persistence prompts annoyance from a sidewalk shoveler and earns them a dismissive dollar from a woman, who jestingly calls out to "Mr. Whiteman," referencing bandleader Paul Whiteman. (Note: The allusion can be explained by Oliver's close physical resemblance to Whiteman.)

Amidst their misfortune, a quarrel with a woman leads to the destruction of their instruments, but a stroke of luck ensues when Stan discovers a wallet. Their brief respite is interrupted by a thief, prompting a chase until they encounter a benevolent police officer who intervenes on their behalf. Grateful for his assistance, Stan and Ollie share a meal with the officer, only to realize to their dismay that the wallet belongs to him.

Upon discovering the truth, the officer's mood sours, leading to their expulsion from the restaurant. Stan's misfortune is further compounded when he is submerged upside down in a barrel of water by the irate waiter. Oliver eventually finds him, but their troubles persist as Stan's unintended consumption of the water results in an unexpected physical transformation, symbolized by his inflated stomach.

== Cast ==
Name	Role
Stan Laurel	Stan
Oliver Hardy	Ollie
Uncredited
Bobby Burns	'Blind' man / deadbeat diner
Baldwin Cooke	Man at window
Kay Deslys	Woman at window
Charlie Hall	Annoyed shopkeeper throwing snowball
Jack Hill	Busboy
Frank Holliday	Policeman
Charles McMurphy	Extra at restaurant
Bob O'Connor	Extra at restaurant
Retta Palmer	Woman leaving window
Blanche Payson	Formidable woman
Tiny Sandford	Pete
Charles Sullivan	Extra at restaurant
Lyle Tayo	Woman at window tossing Stan and Ollie a dollar
Leo Willis	Crook

== Production ==
The film was "made three months after Night Owls."

== Reception ==
Below Zero "demonstrates the team’s skill in presenting situation comedy through visual means", according to The Laurel & Hardy encyclopedia.

The same book recalls that the short "contains very little dialogue, but what there is tends to be quoted frequently. When a lady enquires how much the boys earn per street (so that she can pay them to move two streets away), she calls Ollie ‘Mr Whiteman’, a direct reference to the famous bandleader and Hardy lookalike, Paul Whiteman (the similarity may be inspected in Whiteman’s 1930 film King of Jazz). The computer-colour edition issued on both sides of the Atlantic omits this sequence, as does the British Super-8 sound version released in the late 1970s".

Comparing Berth Marks to this short, William Everson praised the latter over the first, stating "One of the few really poor comedies that the team made, this is a misfire all down the line. The blame cannot be laid entirely on its paucity of plot, since single situations often stood them in good stead, and a similarly simple exercise in frustration, Below Zero, had a great deal of merit."

The short is said to reflect the historical context of its production: "It's the Great Depression of 1929, and Laurel and Hardy are about as depressed as you can get ..." It was also described as "a curious, bizarre, almost surrealist comedy".

== Release ==
An extended Spanish version, Tiembla Y Titubea was also produced with Laurel and Hardy speaking phonetically from blackboards placed just out of camera range; Spanish-speaking actors replacing the English speaking supporting players.
