= Be Big! =

1931 film

- Title card
- Directed by: James W. Horne
- Written by: H.M. Walker
- Produced by: Hal Roach
- Starring: Stan Laurel; Oliver Hardy
- Cinematography: Art Lloyd
- Edited by: Richard C. Currier
- Distributed by: Metro-Goldwyn-Mayer
- Release date: February 7, 1931
- Running time: 27:55
- Country: United States
- Language: English

Be Big! is a Hal Roach three-reel comedy starring Laurel and Hardy. It was shot in November and December 1930, and released on February 7, 1931.

== Plot ==
Laurel and Hardy find themselves on the cusp of a journey to Atlantic City alongside their wives. However, their plans take an unexpected turn when Ollie receives a phone call from Cookie, a lodge acquaintance, inviting them to a stag party in their honor. Despite their initial reluctance to attend, Ollie becomes enticed by the enticing details provided by Cookie.

In a bid to participate in the event, Ollie feigns illness, prompting him to send their wives ahead while he and Stan commit to joining them the next morning. As they prepare for the lodge event, the duo encounters challenges, including a struggle to remove one of Stan's boots from Ollie's foot. However, their ruse is thwarted when the wives return unexpectedly, leaving Stan and Ollie in a state of panic.

Faced with limited options, Stan and Ollie seek refuge in a Murphy bed, their apprehension palpable as they await the inevitable confrontation. Armed with shotguns, their wives take aim at the bed, resulting in its collapse from the second story onto the front lawn.

== Cast ==
Credited:
- Stan Laurel as Stan
- Oliver Hardy as Ollie

Uncredited:

- Anita Garvin as Mrs. Laurel
- Charlie Hall as Bellhop
- Isabelle Keith as Mrs. Hardy
- Baldwin Cooke as Cookie
- Jack Hill as Passerby at station
- Chet Brandenburg as Cab driver
- Jean De Briac as extra
- Spencer Bell as Porter

== Foreign versions ==
Be Big! was filmed in two extended foreign-language versions immediately upon completion of its English incarnation. These foreign versions combined the story of the English original with that of Laughing Gravy, another short from the same year.

Les Carottiers was the French version; it replaced Isabelle Keith with Germaine de Neel as Mrs. Hardy and Jean De Briac in Baldwin Cooke's role of "Cookie." The Spanish version, Los Calavaras, featured Linda Loredo as Mrs. Hardy.

Laurel and Hardy delivered their French and Spanish lines phonetically from cue cards in both foreign versions. Anita Garvin played Mrs. Laurel in all three films; she mouthed her foreign lines phonetically, on-camera but off-mic, while a voice actress just off-camera spoke into a "hot" mic.

== Production ==
The opening titles on the film credit James Parrott as director and Art Lloyd as director of photography, but all contemporary publicity and promotional materials name James W. Horne as director and Jack Stevens as photographer.

Besides serving as a dress extra Jean De Briac was also Laurel's and Hardy's dialogue coach on the French-language version, Les Carottiers (in which he also played Cookie).

This was Anita Garvin's last appearance in a Laurel and Hardy short; since 1927's Why Girls Love Sailors, she had appeared in over a dozen L&H short subjects. She would return in 1938 for their feature Swiss Miss and again in 1940 in A Chump at Oxford.

The premise of Ollie feigning illness so that he and Stan can slip their wives and go off to a special event held by a particular men's club of which they're both members was later reused as part of the plot for their 1933 feature film Sons of the Desert.

== Reception ==
With most of the running time taken up about trying unsuccessfully to change out of each other's riding boots, Be Big! is sometimes regarded as one of the team's weakest short films, with Randy Skretvedt saying; "The film's chief flaw is an excruciatingly protracted sequence which has Stan trying to pull his boot from Hardy's foot; it runs 13 minutes and seems like 20. Fun is fun but there are limits.", while Glenn Mitchell stated that the film was "...generally regarded as an overlong exploration of a single gag. Some idea of its pace may be gauged from the fact that a British 8mm distributor was able to condense the action into an effective single reel!"
