= With Love and Hisses =

1927 film

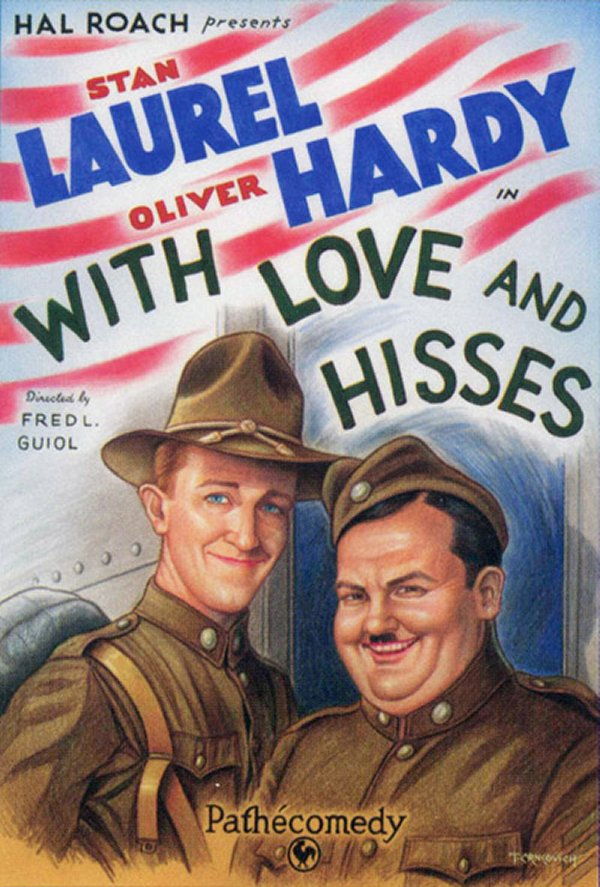
- Film poster
- Directed by: Fred Guiol
- Written by: Hal Roach; H.M. Walker (titles)
- Produced by: Hal Roach
- Starring: Stan Laurel; Oliver Hardy
- Edited by: Richard C. Currier
- Distributed by: Pathé Exchange
- Release date: August 28, 1927
- Running time: 21:48
- Country: United States
- Language: Silent (English intertitles)

Full film

With Love and Hisses is a 1927 American silent comedy short film directed by Fred Guiol and starring Stan Laurel and Oliver Hardy prior to their official billing as the duo Laurel and Hardy. The team appeared in a total of 107 films between 1921 and 1950. With Love and Hisses features Laurel as the lead comedian with Hardy in a supporting role.

== Plot ==
Private Cuthbert Hope, a well-meaning but inept soldier, continually exasperates his superior, the irascible Sergeant Banner, who in turn answers to the equally temperamental Captain Bustle.

While departing by train, Captain Bustle becomes distracted by a group of female admirers and inadvertently steps off the platform before boarding. Once aboard, he discovers Sergeant Banner occupying his compartment and helping himself to the captain's lunch. Meanwhile, Hope is forced to share a compartment with a fellow soldier whose pungent garlic-and-Limburger-cheese sandwich proves intolerable. In an attempt to rid himself of the offending meal, Hope inadvertently sends it into Captain Bustle's face.

Later, during a strenuous march on a sweltering day, Banner's squad succumbs to temptation and stops for a swim in a nearby lake, leaving their uniforms unattended. A discarded cigar accidentally ignites the clothing, destroying the soldiers' uniforms. Their efforts to return to camp unnoticed lead to further disaster when they disturb a hornets' nest, which follows them back to camp and unleashes chaos throughout the military installation.

== Cast ==
- Stan Laurel as Cuthbert Hope
- Oliver Hardy as Top Sergeant Banner
- James Finlayson as Captain Bustle
- Anita Garvin as Superior officer's girlfriend
- Chet Brandenburg as Soldiering rookie
- Frank Brownlee as Maj. Gen. Rohrer
- Josephine Dunn as Girlfriend
- Jerry Mandy as Soldier with voracious appetite
- Frank Saputo as Soldier
- Eve Southern as Superior officer's girlfriend
- Will Stanton as Soldier sleeping next to Hope
- Charlie Hall as Soldier

== See also ==
- 1927 in film
- Laurel and Hardy films
