= Putting Pants on Philip =

1927 silent comedy short film by Clyde Bruckman

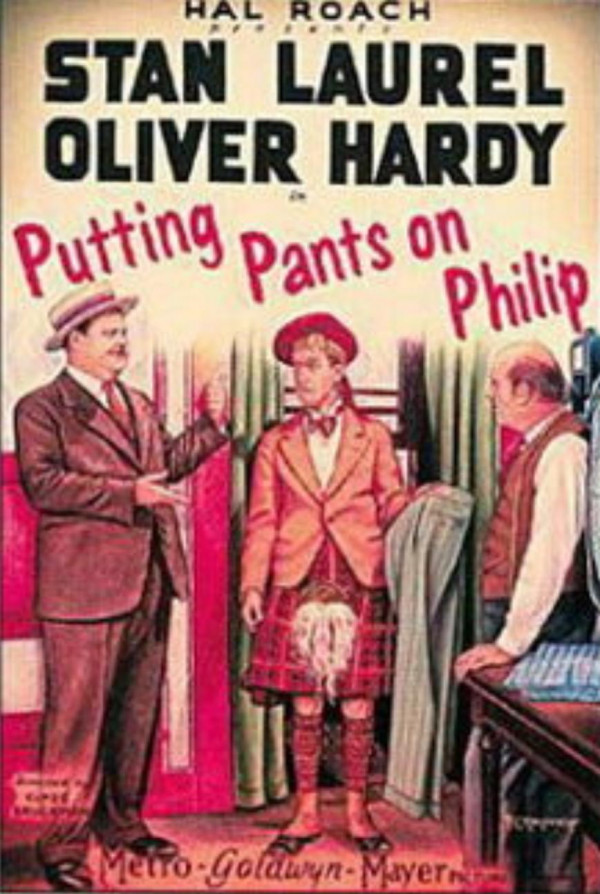
- Theatrical poster
- Directed by: Clyde Bruckman
- Written by: H.M. Walker
- Produced by: Hal Roach
- Starring: Stan Laurel; Oliver Hardy; Charles A. Bachman; Ed Brandenburg; Harvey Clark; Dorothy Coburn; Sam Lufkin
- Cinematography: George Stevens
- Edited by: Richard C. Currier
- Distributed by: Metro-Goldwyn-Mayer
- Release date: December 3, 1927
- Running time: 19 minutes
- Country: United States
- Languages: Silent film English intertitles

Putting Pants On Philip is a silent short film starring British/American comedy duo Laurel and Hardy. Made in 1927, the short is identified by Wes D. Gehring as the actors' first "official" film together as a team.

== Plot ==
The short film.

Piedmont Mumblethunder eagerly anticipates the arrival of his Scottish nephew, Philip, at a pier. Unfamiliar with Philip's appearance but armed with the knowledge that he becomes overwhelmed in the presence of women, Piedmont anxiously awaits his arrival. To his surprise, the misbehaving kilted man during a ship examination turns out to be Philip. Initially taken aback by Philip's effeminate appearance, Piedmont attempts to engage him in conversation and guides him through the town.

However, Piedmont soon discovers that Philip is far from shy and, in fact, exhibits an unabashed fondness for women. His behavior leads to several embarrassing encounters, including inadvertently causing two women to faint by exposing himself while walking over a ventilator grate. Frustrated by Philip's conduct, Piedmont decides to intervene and takes him to a tailor to procure trousers, which Philip vehemently opposes.

Unwilling to give up his pursuit of a young woman he encountered earlier, Philip leaves the tailor's shop. In an attempt to impress her, he removes his kilt to cover a mud puddle, only to be met with rejection when the woman effortlessly bypasses it. The situation further deteriorates when Piedmont, stepping on the discarded kilt, tumbles into a muddy pit. The film ends on a close-up of Oliver Hardy's face showing what critic Janiss Garza describes as "a soon-to-be-classic look of chagrin."

== Production notes ==
Although this was their first "official" film as a team, the iconic Stan and Ollie characters and costumes had yet to become a permanent fixture. Their first appearance as the now familiar "Stan and Ollie" characters was in The Second Hundred Years, also from 1927, which was directed by Fred Guiol and supervised by Leo McCarey, who suggested that the performers be teamed permanently.

The film was partially shot at the historic Culver Hotel.

The film was released on December 3, 1927.

The idea for the film was Stan Laurel's and was based on a story recounted by a friend while Laurel worked in music hall.

== Cast ==
- Stan Laurel as Philip
- Oliver Hardy as Piedmont J. Mumblethunder
- Charles A. Bachman as Officer
- Ed Brandenberg as Bus conductor
- Harvey Clark as Tailor
- Dorothy Coburn as Girl chased by Philip
- Sam Lufkin as Ship's doctor

== Reception ==
Archivist William K. Everson described the film as "one of the real gems of comedy from the late 1920s, and perhaps the most individual of all the Laurel and Hardy comedies, though not necessarily the funniest."

"One of their most unusual, and certainly one of their best with some brilliant pantomime from Laurel, some marvellous sight gags, and a methodical construction that builds steadily, it's a delight throughout. We're deliberately saying nothing about plot since, if you haven't seen it, the sheer shock value of some of it will pay off better through knowing nothing in advance." — William K. Everson
