= The Chimp (1932 film) =

1932 film

- Promotional shot for The Chimp
- Directed by: James Parrott
- Written by: H.M. Walker
- Produced by: Hal Roach
- Starring: Stan Laurel; Oliver Hardy
- Cinematography: Walter Lundin
- Edited by: Richard C. Currier
- Music by: Marvin Hatley; Leroy Shield
- Distributed by: Metro-Goldwyn-Mayer
- Release date: May 21, 1932
- Running time: 25:13
- Country: United States
- Language: English

The Chimp is a Laurel and Hardy short film made in 1932. It was directed by James Parrott, produced by Hal Roach, and distributed by Metro-Goldwyn-Mayer. The second half of the film is a reworking from their last silent film Angora Love (1929), itself reworked into a short film the previous year, Laughing Gravy (1931).

== Plot ==
Laurel and Hardy find themselves employed at a struggling circus, initially performing as part of a Pantomime horse act and later as assistants to the strongman, Destructo. Their involvement inadvertently leads to the destruction of the Big Top during a mishap in Destructo's cannonball-catching routine, resulting in financial ruin for the circus.

As compensation for their unpaid wages, Oliver is assigned a gorilla named Ethel, while Stan receives ownership of a Flea Circus. Despite the film's title, Ethel is not a chimpanzee but is portrayed as a whimsically attired character, wearing a ballet tutu and hat. Facing the challenge of finding lodging for the night, Laurel and Hardy seek refuge at a guest house. However, the landlord refuses to accommodate Ethel. Meanwhile, a lion named MGM, escapes from the circus, adding to the duo's predicament.

In an attempt to conceal Ethel from the landlord and avoid the roaming lion, Laurel and Hardy resort to various schemes, including attempting to smuggle Ethel into their room. Ultimately, they decide to leave Ethel outside while they retire to bed. Their attempts at rest are thwarted by a series of mishaps, including Stanley falling out of bed and the discovery that the flea circus has infiltrated their bedding, leading to discomfort and itching. Additionally, Ethel, drawn by music, intrudes into the room and begins to dance, further complicating matters.

Confusion ensues when the landlord, hearing the commotion, mistakenly believes his wife, also named Ethel, is in the room with Laurel and Hardy. Confronted by the landlord with a pistol, the situation escalates into chaos when Ethel, the gorilla, gains control of the firearm, causing panic among the occupants.

== Cast ==
- Stanley Laurel as Stan
- Oliver Hardy as Ollie
- Tiny Sandford as Destructo
- Billy Gilbert as Landlord
- Charles Gemora as Ethel the gorilla, announcer
- Jimmy Finlayson as Ringmaster
- Dorothy Granger as Ethel, landlord's wife
- Belle Hare as Laid-off Circus Performer
- George Miller as Circus owner
- Bobby Burns as Tenant
- Jack Hill as audience member
- Lois Laurel as audience member
- Baldwin Cooke as audience member
- Dorothy Layton as audience member

== The Sons of the Desert ==
Chapters — called Tents — of The Sons of the Desert, the international Laurel and Hardy Appreciation Society, all take their names from L&H films. The Chimp Tent is in Cincinnati, Ohio.
