= Tiny Sandford =

American actor (1894–1961)

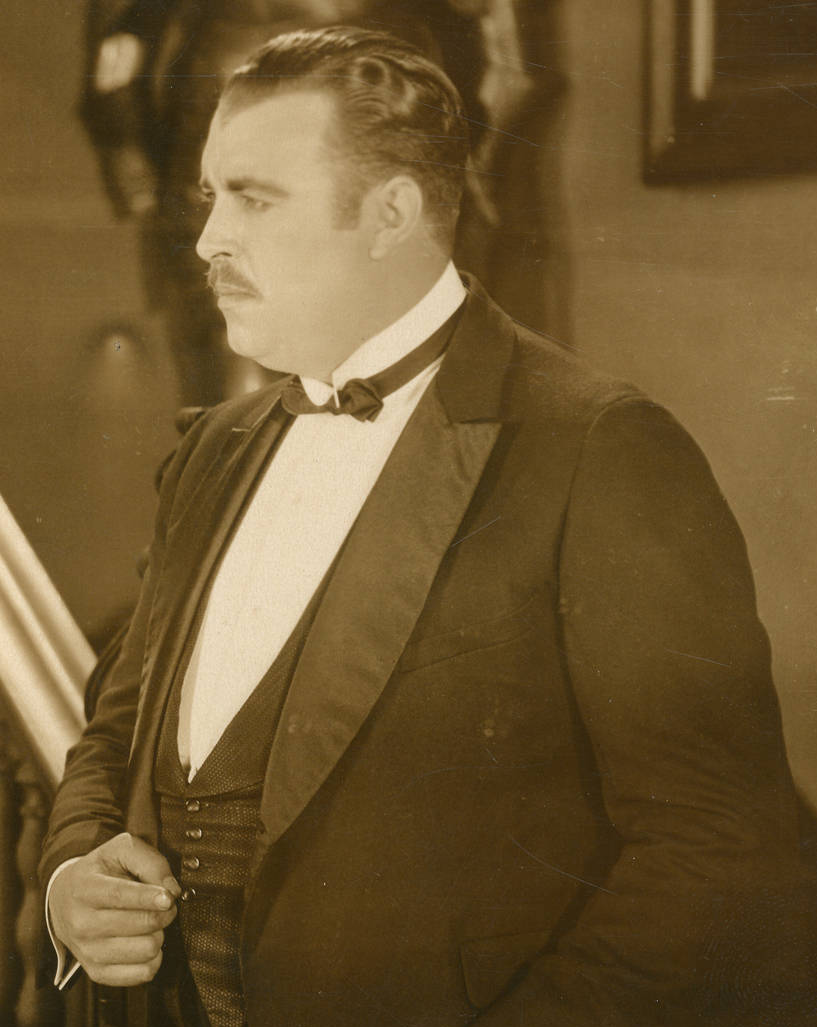
- Sandford in 1922
- Born: Stanley J. Sandford; February 26, 1894; Osage, Iowa, U.S.
- Died: October 29, 1961 (aged 67); Los Angeles, California, U.S.
- Resting place: Chapel of the Pines Crematory
- Occupation: Actor
- Years active: 1916–1940
- Spouse: Edna Sandford (?–?)
- Children: 2

Stanley J. "Tiny" Sandford (February 26, 1894 – October 29, 1961) was an American actor who is best remembered for his roles in Laurel and Hardy and Charlie Chaplin films. His tall, burly physique usually led him to be cast as a comic heavy, and often played policemen, doormen, prizefighters, or bullies.

== Biography ==
Sandford was born in Osage, Iowa, in 1894. After working in stock theater he began acting in movies around 1910. He appeared in The Gold Rush with Charlie Chaplin. Other Chaplin films that he appeared in include The Circus (1928) and Modern Times (1936), where he plays "Big Bill". His films with Laurel and Hardy include Big Business (1929), Double Whoopee (1929), The Chimp (1932), and Our Relations (1936). He appeared in The Warrior's Husband as a clumsy and cowardly Hercules. Sandford also acted in Way Out West, but his sequence was cut from the final take.

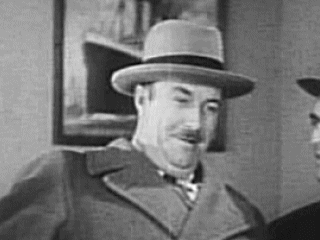
Sandford in A Shriek in the Night (1933)

He also appeared in dramas such as The World's Champion (1922) and The Iron Mask (1929).

He retired from acting in 1940, the year he had a very small role in Charlie Chaplin's The Great Dictator. He died in Los Angeles, California on October 29, 1961.

== Filmography ==
Year	Title	Role	Notes
1916	The Floorwalker	Small Role	Short, Uncredited
1916	The Count	Guest	Short, Uncredited
1919	After His Own Heart	Goliath	
1922	The World's Champion	Lord Brockington	
1922	Don't Shoot	Jim	
1923	Breaking Into Society	A Chiropractor	
1924	Waterfront Wolves	Hans Skol	
1924	Paying the Limit	Ole	
1924	The Family Secret	Cop	Uncredited
1925	Confessions of a Queen		Uncredited
1925	The Gold Rush	Barman	Uncredited
1925	California Straight Ahead	Cop	Uncredited
1925	Madame Behave	Policeman	
1925	The Perfect Clown	Cop	Uncredited
1926	Crazy like a Fox	Conductor	Uncredited
1927	Love My Dog	P. Fulton, attorney at law	Short
1927	Paid to Love	Bartender	Uncredited
1927	The Second Hundred Years	Prison Guard	Short
1927	Sailors, Beware!	Man in robe	Short, Uncredited
1927	Ginsberg the Great	Hercules	
1928	The Circus	The Head Property Man	
1928	Flying Elephants	Hulking Caveman	Short
1928	From Soup to Nuts	Mr. Culpepper	Short
1928	The Gate Crasher	Stage Doorman	
1929	The Iron Mask	Porthos	
1929	Big Business	Policeman	Uncredited
1929	The Far Call	Captain Storkerson	
1929	Double Whoopee	Policeman	Short, Uncredited
1929	Rio Rita	Davalos	Uncredited
1929	The Hoose-Gow	Warden	Short, Uncredited
1930	Blotto	Headwaiter	Short, Uncredited
1930	Puttin' On the Ritz	Heckler	Uncredited
1930	Below Zero	Pete	Uncredited
1930	Doughboys	Recruit	Uncredited
1930	The Laurel-Hardy Murder Case	Policeman	Uncredited
1930	Noche de duendes	Agente de uniforme	Uncredited
1930	Spuk um Mitternacht	Policeman Mueller	Uncredited
1931	Fighting Caravans	Man at Wagon Train	Uncredited
1931	Los presidiarios	Gutiérrez - Prison Guard	Uncredited
1931	Pardon Us	Shields - Prison Guard	
1931	Come Clean	Doorman	Short, Uncredited
1931	The Hard Hombre	Irate Brother	Uncredited
1931	Beau Hunks	Legion Officer	Short, Uncredited
1932	Polly of the Circus	Churchgoer	Uncredited
1932	Spirit of the West	Ranch Cook	
1932	This Is the Night	Porter	Uncredited
1932	The Silver Lining	Court Bailiff	Uncredited
1932	The Chimp	Destructo	Short, Uncredited
1932	Week-End Marriage	Big Man in Theatre Line	Uncredited
1932	The Purchase Price	Sam Perkins - Man at Shivaree	Uncredited
1932	The Thirteenth Guest	Mike - Jailer	Uncredited
1932	Fighting for Justice	Man at Dance	Uncredited
1932	Washington Merry-Go-Round	Worker	Uncredited
1932	The Girl from Calgary	Policeman	Uncredited
1932	Prosperity	Irate Motorist	Uncredited
1933	Diamond Trail	Mullins' Gunman	Uncredited
1933	The Warrior's Husband	Hercules	
1933	The Devil's Brother	Big Woodchopper	Uncredited
1933	A Shriek in the Night	Eddie a detective	Uncredited
1933	Rainbow Ranch	Brawler at dance	
1933	Busy Bodies	Shop Foreman	Short, Uncredited
1933	Queen Christina	Cook at the Inn	Uncredited
1934	I Can't Escape	Georgian Club Doorman	Uncredited
1934	Babes in Toyland	Dunker	Uncredited
1934	Here Comes the Band	Comedian	Uncredited
1935	Fighting Youth	Truck Driver	Uncredited
1935	Remember Last Night?	Truck Driver	Uncredited
1935	Ship Cafe	Stoker	Uncredited
1935	Suicide Squad	Policeman	Uncredited
1936	Modern Times	Big Bill	
1936	Sutter's Gold	San Francisco Troublemaker	Uncredited
1936	Show Boat	Zebe - Backwoodsman	Uncredited
1936	Our Relations	Tony - Grubby Wharf Tough	Uncredited
1936	Mummy's Boys	Construction Foreman	Uncredited
1937	The Road Back	Doorkeeper	Uncredited
1937	Blossoms on Broadway	Workman	Uncredited
1938	The Devil's Party	Cigarette Club Doorman	Uncredited
1940	Florian	Laundry Foreman	Uncredited
1940	The Great Dictator	a comrade soldier in 1918	Uncredited
