= Fred Guiol =

Film director; screenwriter (1898–1964)

- Born: February 17, 1898; San Francisco, California
- Died: May 23, 1964 (aged 66); Bishop, California
- Occupations: Film director, screenwriter

Fred Guiol (February 17, 1898 – May 23, 1964), pronounced "Gill," was an American film director and screenwriter.

== Career ==
Guiol worked at the Hal Roach Studios for many years, first as a property man, later as assistant director and finally writer and director. He directed Laurel and Hardy's earliest short films, as their famous comic partnership gradually developed during 1927. Guiol directed many of Hal Roach's Streamliners in the 1940s.

Guiol had worked closely with another Roach employee, cameraman George Stevens. When Stevens became a director in the 1930s, he often engaged Guiol as a screenwriter, Guiol, along with Ivan Moffat, was nominated for an Academy Award for Best Adapted Screenplay for adapting Edna Ferber's novel Giant into the George Stevens production of Giant.

Fred Guiol is buried in Forest Lawn Memorial Park in Glendale, California.

== Partial filmography ==
- The Battling Orioles (1924)
- Say It with Babies (1926)
- The Cow's Kimona (1926)
- Along Came Auntie (1926)
- Get 'Em Young (1926)
- 45 Minutes from Hollywood (1926)
- Two-Time Mama (1927)
- Duck Soup (1927)
- Slipping Wives (1927)
- Love 'em and Weep (1927)
- Why Girls Love Sailors (1927)
- With Love and Hisses (1927)
- Do Detectives Think? (1927)
- Sugar Daddies (1927)
- The Second Hundred Years (1927)
- Pass the Gravy (1928)
- Breakfast in Bed (1930)
- What's Your Racket? (1934)
- Silly Billies (1936)
- Vigil in the Night (1940)
- Giant (1956)
