= Honolulu Baby =

1933 song written by Marvin Hatley

Song by Ty Parvis
- Released: 1933
- Songwriter: Marvin Hatley

"Honolulu Baby" is a 1933 song written by Marvin Hatley for the Laurel and Hardy film Sons of the Desert.

== Film appearances ==
In Sons of the Desert, Ty Parvis performed the song, with Oliver Hardy performing it again later in the film.

"Honolulu Baby" features, in both vocal and instrumental versions, in numerous subsequent films that were also produced by Hal Roach Studios, producers of the 1930s Laurel & Hardy films. This includes several short films in Roach's Our Gang (The Little Rascals) series, including a performance by one of the amateur kids' talent show acts in the 1935 Our Gang short Beginner's Luck.

== Later versions ==
The song has been covered by the Weintraub Syncopators, Anton LaVey on Satan Takes a Holiday, and Kaʻau Crater Boys on Friends of the Ocean. Sheffield Wednesday supporters have adapted the melody as a football chant.
