= Scram! =

1932 film

- Directed by: Raymond McCarey
- Written by: H.M. Walker
- Produced by: Hal Roach
- Starring: Stan Laurel; Oliver Hardy; Richard Cramer; Arthur Housman; Vivien Oakland; Wilson Benge
- Cinematography: George Stevens
- Edited by: Richard C. Currier
- Distributed by: Metro-Goldwyn-Mayer
- Release date: September 10, 1932
- Running time: 20:30
- Country: United States
- Language: English

Scram! is a 1932 pre-Code Laurel and Hardy film produced by Hal Roach, directed by Ray McCarey, and distributed by Metro-Goldwyn-Mayer.

== Plot ==
Stan and Ollie find themselves entangled in a legal predicament, appearing before Judge Beaumont on charges of vagrancy. Despite their usual behavior, the judge's anger is palpable, aggravated further by the overcrowded jail, which prevents him from enforcing the standard sentence. Consequently, he issues a stern ultimatum, granting the duo one hour to vacate the town under threat of unspecified consequences.

During a fortuitous encounter in a rainstorm, Stan and Ollie assist an inebriated gentleman in retrieving his car keys from a grate. Grateful for their assistance, the man extends an invitation to his mansion, inadvertently leading them to Judge Beaumont's residence. Upon entry, a series of comical missteps ensue, including startling a young woman and inadvertently indulging in alcoholic beverages. Meanwhile, the intoxicated host, unaware of his own home's location, meanders off to find his way.

The situation escalates when Judge Beaumont returns to find Stan and Ollie in compromising circumstances with his wife. Incensed by the intrusion, the judge confronts the duo, prompting a frenzied retreat to a corner of the bedroom. In a frantic attempt to evade the judge's wrath, Stan turns off the lights — plunging the scene into darkness as chaos ensues, conveyed by the soundtrack alone, culminating in a cacophony of crashing sounds and uproar.

== Cast ==
- Stan Laurel as Mr. Laurel
- Oliver Hardy as Mr. Hardy
- Richard Cramer as Judge Beaumont
- Arthur Housman as Drunk
- Vivien Oakland as Mrs. Beaumont
- Wilson Benge as Butler

== Controversy ==
According to the book Laurel & Hardy Compleet by Dutch author and Laurel and Hardy specialist Thomas Leeflang, this film was banned in the Netherlands in 1932. Moral crusaders thought the scene in which Stan and Ollie lie on a bed with a woman was indecent. Today the ban is no longer in effect.

== Preservation ==
Scram! was preserved and restored by the UCLA Film and Television Archive from the nitrate original picture negative, a nitrate lavender master and the nitrate original track negative. The restoration premiered at the UCLA Festival of Preservation in 2022.
