= Lewis R. Foster =

Screenwriter, director, producer, television composer

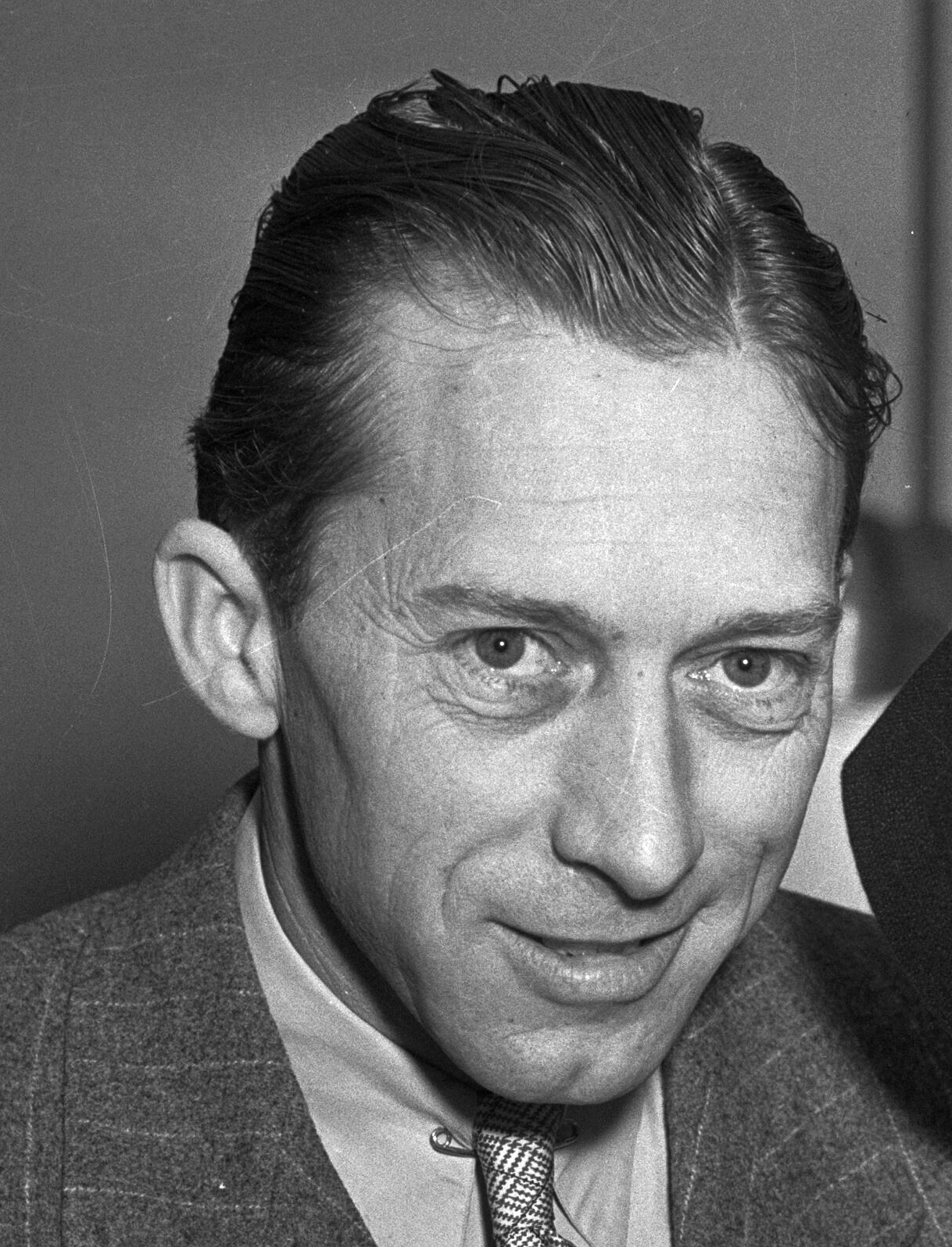
- Foster in 1936
- Born: Lewis Ransom Foster; August 5, 1898; Brookfield, Missouri, United States
- Died: June 10, 1974 (aged 75); Tehachapi, California, United States
- Other names: L R Foster; L.R. Foster; Lewis Foster; Lew Foster
- Occupations: Screenwriter, director, producer, television composer
- Spouse: Dorothy Wilson (m. 1936–1974)
- Awards: Best Writing, Original Story; 1940 Mr. Smith Goes to Washington

Lewis Ransom Foster (August 5, 1898 – June 10, 1974) was an American screenwriter, film/television director, and film/television producer. He directed and wrote over one hundred films and television series between 1926 and 1960.

== Selected filmography ==
=== Director ===
- Double Whoopee (1929)
- Berth Marks (1929)
- Angora Love (1929)
- Dizzy Dates (1930)
- Blondes Prefer Bonds (1931)
- Love Letters of a Star (1936)
- The Man Who Cried Wolf (1937)
- El Paso (1949)
- The Lucky Stiff (1949)
- Manhandled (1949)
- Captain China (1950)
- Passage West (1951)
- Hong Kong (1952)
- Tropic Zone (1953)
- Those Redheads From Seattle (1953) filmed in 3-D
- Four Star Playhouse (1 episode, 1954)
- Crashout (1955)
- The Bold and the Brave (1956)
- Cavalcade of America (2 episodes, 1955–1956)
- The Adventures of Jim Bowie (21 episodes, 1956–1957)
- Tonka (1958)
- The Sign of Zorro (1958)
- The Wonderful World of Disney (10 episodes, 1957–1961)

=== Writer ===
- The Merry Widower (1926)
- Wrong Again (Story, 1929)
- Broken Wedding Bells (1930)
- The Great Pie Mystery (1931)
- Air Eagles (1931)
- The Girl in the Tonneau (1932)
- Cheating Blondes (1933)
- Stolen Harmony (1935)
- Two in a Crowd (1936)
- The Magnificent Brute (1936)
- She's Dangerous (1937)
- Tom Sawyer, Detective (1938)
- Mr. Smith Goes to Washington (Story, 1939)
- Million Dollar Legs (1939)
- Golden Gloves (1940)
- The Farmer's Daughter (1940)
- Adventure in Washington (1941)
- I Live on Danger (1942)
- Alaska Highway (1943)
- The More The Merrier (1943)
- Can't Help Singing (1944)
- It's in the Bag! (1945)
- I Wonder Who's Kissing Her Now (1947)
- The Lucky Stiff (1949)
- The Eagle and the Hawk (1950)
- Crosswinds (1951)
- The Blazing Forest (1952)
- Crashout (1955)
- The Adventures of Jim Bowie (5 episodes, 1956)
- Tales of Wells Fargo (2 episodes, 1957–1961)
- The Wonderful World of Disney (3 episodes, 1959–1960)

== Awards and nominations ==
Year	Award	Result	Category	Film
1940	Academy Awards	Won	Best Writing, Original Story	Mr. Smith Goes to Washington
1944	Academy Awards	Nominated	Best Writing, Screenplay	The More the Merrier (Shared with Richard Flournoy, Frank Ross and Robert Russell)
