= Galaxy of Stars =

1936 film of Laurel and Hardy

Galaxy of Stars (1936) is an American promotional short film released by Metro-Goldwyn-Mayer only for MGM exhibitors in Europe and Africa, featuring Laurel and Hardy, and rediscovered in 2005.

The 8.5-minute film presents about three minutes of Laurel and Hardy promoting eight MGM films, none of which feature the duo. The film is dubbed in French, with much of the comedy revolving around a telescope. Also featured in the clip is Laurel and Hardy regular James Finlayson playing their foil.
