= Busy Bodies =

1933 short film by Lloyd French

- Directed by: Lloyd French
- Written by: Stan Laurel
- Produced by: Hal Roach
- Starring: Stan Laurel; Oliver Hardy; Charlie Hall; Tiny Sandford
- Edited by: Bert Jordan
- Production company: Hal Roach Studios
- Distributed by: Metro-Goldwyn-Mayer
- Release date: October 7, 1933
- Running time: 19' 22"
- Country: United States
- Language: English

Busy Bodies is a 1933 American short comedy film starring Laurel and Hardy.

== Plot ==
Stan and Ollie embark on their journey to their new employment as carpenters at the sawmill with a sense of enthusiasm, traveling in their Ford Model T. Their vehicle, equipped with a makeshift car radio in the form of a wind-up phonograph beneath the hood, provides entertainment along the way. Upon arrival, their day at the sawmill commences with a series of slapstick mishaps, including inadvertent encounters with wooden planks and a comical entrapment of Ollie's hands in a window frame by Stan.

Further episodes ensue as they engage in playful antics, such as tricking a coworker into smoking despite posted regulations, and engaging in a lighthearted exchange involving torn pants and a mischievously applied paintbrush. Subsequently, Ollie finds himself propelled through a ventilator duct and out of an attic vent, prompting Stan to come to his aid by ascending a ladder.

However, their rescue attempt takes a calamitous turn when a barrel of shellac is dislodged, causing Stan and Ollie to plummet from the vent port along with the ladder. Meanwhile, bystanders below are caught in the chaos, with one falling into a vat of whitewash and the other seeking refuge in a shed, which is subsequently destroyed upon impact.

Upon assisting their foreman out of the wreckage, Stan and Ollie hastily depart, only to encounter further misfortune as their attempts to flee result in their car being sawed in half by a large band saw. Undeterred, Stan salvages the phonograph from the wreckage and attempts to enjoy music, much to Ollie's chagrin.

== Cast ==
- Stan Laurel as Stan
- Oliver Hardy as Ollie
- Dick Gilbert as shoveler
- Charlie Hall as shop worker
- Tiny Sandford as shop foreman
- Jack Hill as shop worker
- Charley Young as shop worker
