= Night Owls (1930 film) =

1930 film

- Directed by: James Parrott
- Written by: H.M. Walker
- Produced by: Hal Roach
- Starring: Stan Laurel; Oliver Hardy; Edgar Kennedy; James Finlayson
- Cinematography: George Stevens
- Edited by: Richard C. Currier
- Music by: Marvin Hatley
- Distributed by: Metro-Goldwyn-Mayer; DIC Entertainment (1990 re-release)
- Release date: January 4, 1930
- Running time: 20:44 (English); 36:06 (Spanish)
- Country: United States
- Language: English

Night Owls is a 1930 American Pre-Code Laurel and Hardy short film. It was filmed in October and November 1929, and released January 4, 1930.

== Plot ==
Police officer Edgar Kennedy finds himself under pressure from his police chief to address a surge in burglaries within his jurisdiction or face dismissal from his position for lack of effort and attentiveness. Seeking a solution to appease his superior, Kennedy encounters vagrants Laurel and Hardy and devises a scheme to stage a burglary at the chief's residence in a bid to curry favor and appear to be effective and vigilant at protecting his community.

Initially hesitant due to the perceived risk, Laurel and Hardy are coerced into the plan by Kennedy's threats of severe punishment ("Ninety days in jail!") for their vagrancy. Assured by Kennedy that he will ensure their release upon apprehension, the duo reluctantly agrees to participate. However, their endeavor is beset by numerous obstacles and complications as they clumsily carry out the burglary.

Ultimately, as the plot unfolds, the chief discovers Kennedy alone and in inadvertent possession of the stolen items within his own home, causing the chief to falsely accuse Kennedy of committing all of the previous burglaries himself, and thus leading to the unraveling of his entire deceitful scheme. Despite encountering various challenges along the way, Laurel and Hardy manage to evade capture, escaping the predicament unscathed.

== Cast ==
- Stan Laurel as Stan Laurel
- Oliver Hardy as Oliver "Ollie" Hardy
- Edgar Kennedy as Officer Kennedy
- James Finlayson as Butler Meadows
- Anders Randolf as the Police Captain

== Production ==
This was the first film to use their celebrated theme tune, "The 'Ku-Ku' Song", written by Marvin Hatley. The Film Classics reissue print features the instrumental version of Marvin Hatley's "Honolulu Baby" from the Sons of the Desert soundtrack in place of "The 'Ku-Ku' Song."

== International versions ==
The film was also released in an alternate Spanish version, Ladrones, expanded to nearly four reels in length instead of the English two reels. The film was also released in an Italian version, Ladroni, and in an Esperanto version Ŝtelistoj, which are both now lost. The foreign versions retained not only the headliners, but Edgar Kennedy and James Finlayson as well. The English and Spanish versions are available on DVD.
