= Harry Bernard =

American actor (1878–1940)

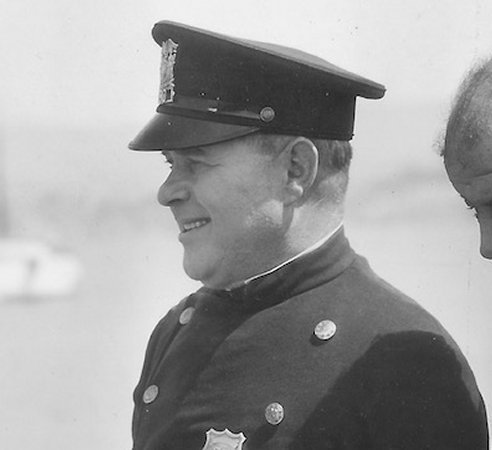
- Born: January 13, 1878; San Francisco, California, U.S.
- Died: November 4, 1940 (aged 62); Hollywood, Los Angeles, California, U.S.
- Occupation: Actor
- Years active: 1915–1940

Harry Bernard (January 13, 1878 – November 4, 1940) was an American actor and comedian. He is best remembered for his appearance in numerous comedy films by Mack Sennett and Hal Roach.

Harry Bernard appeared in more than 150 films between 1915 and 1940, most often typecast as a policeman. He collaborated with Laurel & Hardy in 25 films, Our Gang in nine films and Charley Chase in 33 films. The character actor also performed in a theatre and vaudeville. Born in San Francisco, California, Bernard died of a heart attack in Hollywood in 1940. He was married to Jere Gerard Bernard (1886-1970), and they had one daughter named, Patricia.

== Selected filmography ==
- Bluff (1916)
- Two Tars (1928, Short) - Truck Driver
- Liberty (1929, Short) - Worker at Sea Food Dealer
- Wrong Again (1929, Short) - Policeman
- Night Owls (1930, Short) - Policeman (uncredited)
- They Learned About Women (1930) - Baseball Spectator (uncredited)
- The Rogue Song (1930) - Guard
- Let's Go Native (1930) - Mover (uncredited)
- Noche de duendes (1930) - Un pasajero (uncredited)
- Another Fine Mess (1930, Short) - Policeman (uncredited)
- Laughing Gravy (1930, Short) - Policeman (uncredited)
- Pardon Us (1931) - Desk Sergeant (uncredited)
- Shiver My Timbers (1931, Short) - Pirate
- Any Old Port! (1932, Short) - Boxing Promoter (uncredited)
- Birthday Blues (1932, Short) - Store proprietor
- Cheating Blondes (1933) - Tenement Neighbor (uncredited)
- The Devil's Brother (1933) - Bandit / Drunk (uncredited)
- Sons of the Desert (1933) - Bartender / Cop (uncredited)
- Six of a Kind (1934) - Eyeshade Man (uncredited)
- Our Daily Bread (1934) - Chief (uncredited)
- Kentucky Kernels (1934) - Destitute Man (uncredited)
- The Live Ghost (1934, Short) - Joe - Bartender (uncredited)
- Ruggles of Red Gap (1935) - Harry - Bartender #2 (uncredited)
- Stolen Harmony (1935) - Peanut Vendor (uncredited)
- Hot Tip (1935) - Miller - Barber (uncredited)
- The Rainmakers (1935) - Fireman (uncredited)
- The Milky Way (1936) - Cop (uncredited)
- The Bohemian Girl (1936) - Town Crier (uncredited)
- Silly Billies (1936) - Prospector (uncredited)
- Panic on the Air (1936) - Groundskeeper (uncredited)
- Neighborhood House (1936) - Irate Moviegoer (uncredited)
- Parole! (1936) - Workman (uncredited)
- Kelly the Second (1936) - Andrews Man (uncredited)
- Blackmailer (1936) - Gateman (uncredited)
- 36 Hours to Kill (1936) - Pullman Passenger (uncredited)
- Swing Time (1936) - Second Stagehand (uncredited)
- Our Relations (1936) - First Police Officer (uncredited)
- Mr. Cinderella (1936) - Old Ford Driver (uncredited)
- Killer at Large (1936) - Sexton (uncredited)
- General Spanky (1936) - Minor Role (uncredited)
- Let's Make a Million (1936) - Frisby
- Counterfeit Lady (1936) - Harris (uncredited)
- The Devil's Playground (1937) - Husband (uncredited)
- Borderland (1937) - El Rio Bartender (uncredited)
- Motor Madness (1937) - Proprietor of Hot Dog Stand (uncredited)
- Way Out West (1937) - Man Eating at Bar (uncredited)
- I Promise to Pay (1937) - Henchman (uncredited)
- The Frame-Up (1937) - Henchman (uncredited)
- North of the Rio Grande (1937) - Bartender Harry (uncredited)
- New Faces of 1937 (1937) - Bridge Guard (uncredited)
- It Can't Last Forever (1937) - Stock Swindle Victim (uncredited)
- Carnival Queen (1937) - Advertising Man (uncredited)
- Life Begins with Love (1937) - Tramp (uncredited)
- Roll Along, Cowboy (1937) - Ranch Foreman Shep
- The Shadow (1937) - Joey - Night Watchman
- Goodbye Broadway (1938) - Asylum Guard (uncredited)
- Juvenile Court (1938) - Hick in Drugstore (uncredited)
- Girls' School (1938) - Kelsey - Campus Guard (uncredited)
- The Spider's Web (1938, Serial) - Watchman (uncredited)
- The Lady Objects (1938) - Janitor (uncredited)
- Trade Winds (1938) - Sound Man (uncredited)
- Homicide Bureau (1939) - Joe (uncredited)
- Let Us Live (1939) - Auto Show Watchman (uncredited)
- Mandrake the Magician (1939, Serial) - Construction Camp Watchman (uncredited)
- Five Little Peppers and How They Grew (1939) - Caretaker (uncredited)
- Konga, the Wild Stallion (1939) - Jury Foreman (uncredited)
- A Chump at Oxford (1939) - Policeman Shot by Vandervere (uncredited)
- Saps at Sea (1940) - Harbor Patrol Captain (final film role)
