= The Laurel-Hardy Murder Case =

1930 short film by James Parrott

- Official movie poster
- Directed by: James Parrott
- Written by: H.M. Walker
- Produced by: Hal Roach
- Starring: Stan Laurel; Oliver Hardy
- Cinematography: Walter Lundin; George Stevens
- Edited by: Richard C. Currier
- Music by: Marvin Hatley; Nathaniel Shilkret
- Distributed by: Metro-Goldwyn-Mayer
- Release date: September 6, 1930
- Running time: 29:43 (English); 47:08 (Spanish)
- Country: United States
- Language: English

The full film

The Laurel-Hardy Murder Case is a Laurel and Hardy pre-Code comedy horror film released in 1930. It is one of a handful of three-reel comedies they made, running 28 minutes. It was directed by James Parrott, produced by Hal Roach and distributed by Metro-Goldwyn-Mayer.

In the film, Stan learns of the death of a supposed relative. He heads to the Laurel mansion for the reading of his kinsman's will, in hopes of inheriting part of the man's estate. After arriving at the mansion, he learns that his kinsman was murdered and that the police are gathering all of the deceased's potential heirs. The assembled family members start mysteriously disappearing. Stan and his friend Ollie engage in conflict with the murderer, but then wake up from a shared nightmare. In the United States, the film entered the public domain on January 1, 2026.

== Plot ==
Laurel and Hardy are seated at a dockside where Stan is fishing. A newspaper notice catches Ollie's attention; it says that one Ebenezer Laurel has died and left a large estate, and that parties interested in the estate should go to the Laurel mansion for the reading of the will. Despite Stan's uncertainty regarding his relation to Ebenezer, the duo resolves to attend the reading of the will at the Laurel mansion.

Arriving amid a thunderstorm, they are greeted by a police detective who tells them Ebenezer Laurel did not die a natural death, and that the duo, along with the other potential heirs who have gathered, will be held on suspicion of murder until the crime is solved. Assigned to spend the night in the very room where the body was found, Stan and Ollie experience a series of terrors: a pair of glowing eyes (a cat), ghosts (bedsheet-draped furniture), and a bat. Worse, screams are heard throughout the night as, one after another, the assembled relatives mysteriously disappear – in each case after being summoned by the enigmatic butler into the study to answer a telephone call.

As Stan and Ollie grapple with the events unfolding around them, they too are approached by the butler, who tells them they are wanted on the phone. In the study, Ollie nearly falls victim to the same concealed trapdoor that has claimed the ill-fated relatives. In a climactic confrontation, Stan and Ollie are attacked by the murderer, who is disguised in female attire and brandishes a knife. A fight ensues, but the scene dissolves as Stan and Ollie abruptly awaken from their nightmare to find themselves scuffling with each other at the dockside and tumbling into the water.

== Cast ==
- Stan Laurel as Stan
- Oliver Hardy as Ollie
- Frank Austin as Butler (uncredited)
- Stanley Blystone as Detective (uncredited)
- Bobby Burns as Nervous Relative at Window (uncredited)
- Rosa Gore as Old Relative (uncredited)
- Dorothy Granger as Young Relative (uncredited)
- Dell Henderson as Housekeeper (uncredited)
- Fred Kelsey as Chief of Detectives (uncredited)
- Lon Poff as Old Relative (uncredited)
- Tiny Sandford as Policeman (uncredited)
- Art Rowlands as Theatre-Going Relative (uncredited)

== Cultural significance ==
This first episode for the 1930–31 season had orchestral music scoring in places and no background music in others. Leroy Shield's tunes by now were featured in Hal Roach's Our Gang series, and had been tried in a few previous Laurel and Hardy films. These tunes would be featured from this time on, beginning with their subsequent release, Another Fine Mess.

In The Laurel-Hardy Murder Case, Oliver utters for the first time the iconic phrase, "Here's another nice mess you've gotten me into", often erroneously cited as "Here's another fine mess you've gotten me into". The misquotation has entered everyday vernacular.

== Influences and title ==
- The film is a parody of the silent horror film The Cat and the Canary (1927).
- The film is also a parody of a silent film called The Bat (1926).
- The film name may be a play on words from the film The Canary Murder Case (1929), and other titles based on Philo Vance mystery novels, although the films' plots are totally different. The dash in place of an ampersand may also indicate that the title derives from the Hall-Mills murder case, a high-profile New Jersey murder trial that dominated newspaper front pages throughout much of 1926.
- The 1943 Metro-Goldwyn-Mayer animated short directed by Tex Avery, Who Killed Who?, borrowed imagery, characters and situations from the film.
- If a Body Meets a Body (1945) with The Three Stooges has a similar plot, and also features actor Fred Kelsey.
- The opening title says that "Mr. Laurel and Mr. Hardy had been looking for work since 1921" which was the date their first short film was made.
