= One Good Turn (1931 film) =

1931 film

- Theatrical release poster
- Directed by: James W. Horne
- Written by: H. M. Walker
- Produced by: Hal Roach
- Starring: Stan Laurel; Oliver Hardy
- Cinematography: Art Lloyd
- Edited by: Richard C. Currier
- Music by: Marvin Hatley; Leroy Shield
- Distributed by: Metro-Goldwyn-Mayer
- Release date: October 31, 1931
- Running time: 20:34
- Country: United States
- Language: English

One Good Turn is a 1931 American Pre-Code short comedy film directed by James W. Horne and starring Laurel and Hardy. It was the first Laurel and Hardy film to feature support from Billy Gilbert.

== Plot ==
In the midst of the Great Depression, Stan and Ollie find themselves in dire circumstances, resorting to begging for food. Their plight takes a fortuitous turn when a benevolent elderly woman offers them sandwiches, providing a brief respite from their hunger. However, their relief is short-lived as they overhear news of the elderly woman facing eviction due to an alleged robbery and subsequent inability to pay her mortgage obligations. It transpires however, that this is only a rehearsal for a local theatre performance.

Misinterpreting the situation, Stan and Ollie believe the elderly woman's plight to be genuine and decide to take action to assist her. In a gesture of solidarity, they opt to sell their car to raise funds to aid her cause. However, their noble intentions are complicated when, during an auction, a drunken individual clandestinely places a wallet into Stan's pocket, leading to a misunderstanding and accusations of theft from Ollie.

Upon their return to the elderly woman's home, the truth is revealed, dispelling the misconceptions surrounding the alleged robbery. Despite the satisfactory resolution, Stan seizes the opportunity for retaliation against Ollie for his earlier accusations.

== Cast ==
- Stan Laurel as Stan
- Oliver Hardy as Ollie
- Mary Carr as The Old lady
- James Finlayson as James Finlayson, a Community Player who plays the landlord
- Billy Gilbert as The Drunk
- Gordon Douglas as a Community player
- Dorothy Granger as a Community Player
- Snub Pollard as a Community Player
- Lyle Tayo as a Community Player

== Production notes ==
Stan Laurel's daughter, Lois, harbored a fear of Oliver Hardy, whom she affectionately referred to as "Uncle Babe." This apprehension stemmed from the frequent scenes in Laurel and Hardy films where Hardy's character would hit her father. In response to his daughter's discomfort, Laurel wrote a scene in which his character took out his anger on Hardy, thus reversing the roles and providing a sense of satisfaction for Lois.
