= Thicker than Water (1935 film) =

1935 film by James W. Horne

- Theatrical release poster
- Directed by: James W. Horne
- Written by: Stan Laurel (story); Frank Tashlin (uncredited)
- Produced by: Hal Roach
- Starring: Stan Laurel; Oliver Hardy
- Cinematography: Art Lloyd
- Edited by: Ray Snyder
- Music by: Marvin Hatley; Leroy Shield
- Distributed by: Metro-Goldwyn-Mayer
- Release date: August 6, 1935
- Running time: 20:45
- Language: English

Thicker than Water is a short film starring Laurel and Hardy, directed by James W. Horne, produced by Hal Roach, and released in 1935 by Metro-Goldwyn-Mayer. The short also features James Finlayson and Daphne Pollard in supporting roles. It was the last two-reel comedy starring the comedy team, as Hal Roach decided to end Laurel and Hardy short films and move them solely into feature films.

== Plot ==
Stan and Ollie find themselves tasked with washing dishes by Ollie's wife, initiating a series of mishaps. Stan's overly generous application of liquid detergent results in an excessively thick washing solution, leading to further complications as Ollie attempts to wash the dishes. James Finlayson's character then arrives to collect payment for some furniture. Stan, Ollie and Mrs. Hardy embark on a convoluted argument about "the money that you gave to him, to give to me to pay him".

In a bid to resolve the situation, Ollie withdraws his and his wife's savings to purchase the furniture outright, but inadvertently squanders most of the money on a grandfather clock at an auction, only for it to be destroyed as he and Stan are transporting it home. As a result of this, Ollie is beaten by his wife with a frying pan, resulting in serious injuries requiring a hospital visit.

The doctor enlists Stan as an unwilling blood donor for Ollie's transfusion, leading to a series of comical errors with the equipment. The machine malfunctions, causing several back-and-forth exchanges of blood between the two, ultimately culminating in the machine's explosion. When they leave the hospital, Stan and Ollie discover that their physical appearances have been interchanged, prompting them to engage in imitations of each other's mannerisms, comically embodying each other's identities, including voices and signature catchphrases.

== Cast ==
List of cast members
Name	Role
Stan Laurel	--- Stanley
Oliver Hardy	--- Ollie
Daphne Pollard	--- Mrs. Daphne Hardy
James Finlayson	--- Mr. Finlayson
Uncredited
Harry Bowen	--- auctioneer
Ed Brandenburg	--- bank teller
Allan Cavan	--- Dr. F. D. Allen
Baldwin Cooke	--- hospital visitor
Lester Dorr	--- man at auction
Bess Flowers	--- nurse
Gladys Gale	--- auction bidder
Grace Goodall	--- nurse Goodall
Charlie Hall	--- bank teller

== Production notes ==
At three points in the film, Laurel and Hardy drag the next scene into the frame from off-camera. This effect was achieved with the optical-printing device known as a wipe.
