= Me and My Pal (1933 film) =

- Directed by: Charles Rogers; Lloyd French
- Produced by: Hal Roach
- Starring: Stan Laurel; Oliver Hardy
- Cinematography: Art Lloyd
- Edited by: Bert Jordan
- Music by: Marvin Hatley; Leroy Shield
- Distributed by: Metro-Goldwyn-Mayer
- Release date: April 22, 1933
- Running time: 20:19
- Country: United States
- Language: English

Me and My Pal is a 1933 American pre-Code short film starring Laurel and Hardy, directed by Lloyd French and Charles Rogers, and produced by Hal Roach.

== Plot ==
Ollie, poised to marry the daughter of a wealthy oil magnate named Peter Cucumber, finds himself embroiled in a series of comedic misadventures alongside his friend, Stan, who serves as the best man. Stan's wedding present, a jigsaw puzzle, inadvertently becomes the focal point of their morning, captivating the attention of various individuals including a taxi driver, Ollie's butler, and a telegram delivery boy. As the completion of the puzzle eludes them, tensions rise, culminating in Cucumber's ire at the delay of his daughter's nuptials.

The scenario unfolds further as a confrontation ensues, leading to a police raid and subsequent arrests, sparing only Stan and Ollie who manage to conceal themselves. Amidst the tumult, the puzzle, symbolic of their predicament, is accidentally destroyed. Ollie's fortunes take a downturn with news of a financial crash affecting his investments in "The Great International Horsecollar Corporation," prompting a heated exchange between the friends.

Despite Stan's hopeful reassurances, Ollie's frustration reaches its zenith, leading to a decisive expulsion of Stan from the premises. Ultimately, amidst the discord and upheaval, Stan unwittingly discovers the missing piece of the jigsaw puzzle.

== Cast ==
Credited

- Stan Laurel as Stan
- Oliver Hardy as Ollie
- James Finlayson as Peter Cucumber
- Marion Bardell as bride

Uncredited

- Eddie Baker as policeman
- Billy Bletcher as police radio dispatcher
- Carroll Borland as bridesmaid
- Mary Kornman as bridesmaid
- Charles McMurphy as policeman
- Eddie Dunn as cabdriver
- James C. Morton as traffic police
- Bobby Dunn as telegram messenger
- Charlie Hall as delivery boy
- Frank Terry as Hives the butler, announcer
- Charley Young as usher

== Reception ==
Kine Weekly wrote: "This quick comedy, which is enlivened by slapstick, tells how a proposed marriage is wrecked by the bridegroom and best man's preoccupation in a jigsaw puzzle. Capital comedy bet."

== Restoration ==
In 2016, it was one of several Laurel and Hardy films to be restored by the UCLA Film & Television Archive.
