= Sugar Daddies =

1927 film

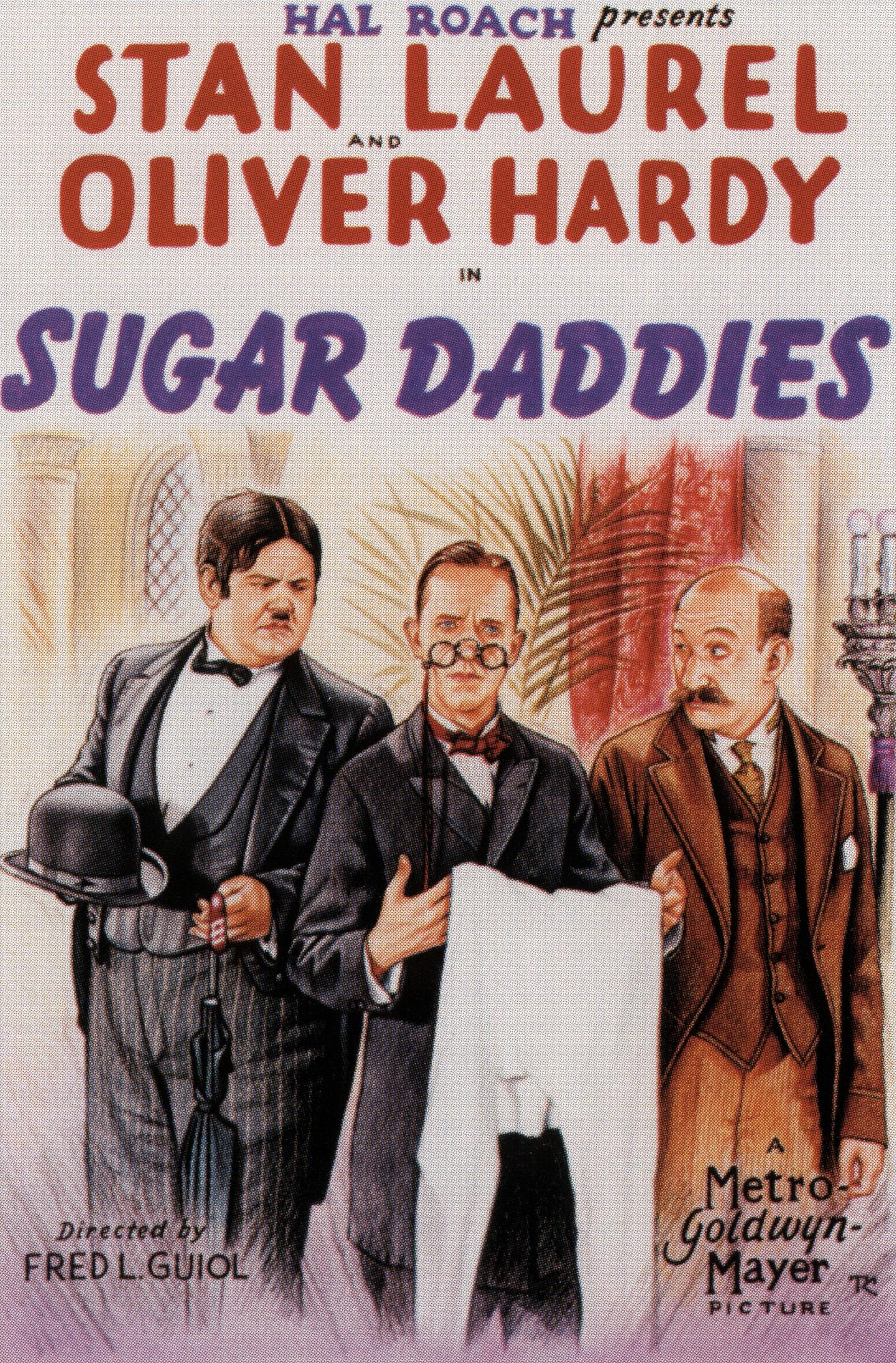
- Theatrical release poster
- Directed by: Fred Guiol; Leo McCarey
- Written by: H.M. Walker (titles)
- Produced by: Hal Roach
- Starring: Jimmy Finlayson; Stan Laurel
- Cinematography: George Stevens
- Distributed by: Metro-Goldwyn-Mayer
- Release date: September 10, 1927
- Running time: 16:49
- Country: United States
- Languages: Silent film English intertitles

Full film

Sugar Daddies is a silent comedy short film starring Jimmy Finlayson, Stan Laurel and Oliver Hardy prior to their official billing as the duo Laurel and Hardy. The team appeared in a total of 107 films between 1921 and 1951. The film is directed by Fred Guiol and Leo McCarey.

== Plot ==
Following a night of revelry, a wealthy oil magnate awakens to the surprising revelation of his recent marriage, accompanied by a gold-digging stepdaughter and brother-in-law intent on his demise for financial gain. Upon encountering a blackmail scheme, the tycoon seeks refuge in a hotel with his butler and legal counsel. Employing a disguise involving his lawyer and the assistance of his butler, the tycoon navigates a series of frantic escapades, including pursuits through a dance hall and amusement park, to evade his pursuers and safeguard his assets.

The so-called brother-in-law is demanding $50,000.00 for an annulment. It is strongly implied he and his "bride" make their living from this sort of shakedown. Cyrus Brittle's meek lawyer (Laurel) arrives, his briefcase containing only his dirty laundry. As the brother-in-law's physical threats increase, Brittle, lawyer, and their butler temporarily escape to a Coney Island hotel, but find their antagonists camped in the lobby. For the second time, the old "Bent Double" routine is resorted to—Laurel standing on Brittle's shoulders underneath a long coat, with Butler Hardy escorting the "very tall lady" outside. The masquerade is almost exposed by an overly curious dog. They attempt to hide on a dance floor, but below-decks Brittle keeps getting kicked in the face.

At the conclusion, all parties wind up equally buffeted in the "Fun House", complete with Hall Of Mirrors, Revolving Barrel Chamber, and long playground slides.

== Cast ==
- James Finlayson as Oil tycoon Cyrus Brittle
- Stan Laurel as Brittle's lawyer
- Oliver Hardy as Brittle's butler
- Noah Young as Brittle's brother-in-law
- Charlotte Mineau as Mrs. Brittle
- Edna Marion as Daughter
- Eugene Pallette as Brittle's butler look-alike
- Jack Hill as Hotel staff
- Charlie Hall as Hotel staff
- Sam Lufkin as Funhouse ticket taker
- Dorothy Coburn as Girl in fun house
- Ray Cooke as Bellboy
