= The Second Hundred Years (film) =

1927 short film by Fred Guiol

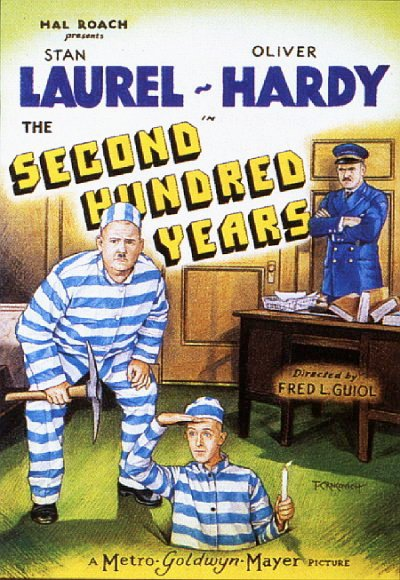
- Theatrical poster
- Directed by: Fred Guiol
- Written by: Leo McCarey (story); H.M. Walker (titles)
- Produced by: Hal Roach
- Starring: Stan Laurel; Oliver Hardy
- Cinematography: George Stevens
- Edited by: Richard C. Currier
- Distributed by: Metro-Goldwyn-Mayer
- Release date: October 8, 1927
- Running time: 22:36
- Country: United States
- Language: Silent (English intertitles)

The Second Hundred Years (a.k.a. The Second 100 Years) is a 1927 American silent comedy short film starring Stan Laurel and Oliver Hardy prior to their official billing as the duo Laurel and Hardy. William K. Everson identifies this as the first "official" Laurel and Hardy film in which they are presented as a team. The team appeared in a total of 107 films between 1921 and 1951.

== Plot ==
Full Movie

Stan and Ollie are two inmates sharing a prison cell. Together, they devise a plan to escape by digging a tunnel. However, their escape attempt takes an unexpected turn when they accidentally emerge through the floor of the warden's office. After a brief pursuit, they are apprehended and returned to their cell.

Undeterred, Stan and Ollie disguise themselves as painters and exit the prison during a meal break, posing as members of a painting crew. As they paint everything in sight, including a parked car and a passerby, they attract the attention of a vigilant policeman. In a bid to evade capture, they hijack a limousine and don the evening attire of its occupants, who happen to be French prison officials visiting the governor.

Mistaken for the French dignitaries, Stan and Ollie attend a banquet hosted by the governor. Amidst comical mishaps, such as Stan's struggle with a wayward cherry, they manage to maintain their charade until they are recognized by their fellow inmates and the real French officials. A chase ensues, leading to their eventual return to prison.

== Cast ==
- Stan Laurel as Little Goofy
- Oliver Hardy as Big Goofy
- Charlie Hall as Convict
- James Finlayson as Gov. Browne Van Dyke
- Otto Fries as Lecoque
- Rosemary Theby as Dinner Guest
- Ellinor Van der Veer as Countess de Cognac
- Dorothy Coburn as Flapper
- Tiny Sandford as Guard
- William Gillespie as Extra
- Frank Brownlee as Prison Warden
- Edgar Dearing as Officer
- Charles A. Bachman as Officer
- Bob O'Conor as Voitrex
- Eugene Pallette as Dinner Guest

== Notes ==
- Laurel and Hardy's heads were shaved for their appearance in this film; their hair had not yet grown back in their roles in Max Davidson's Call Of The Cuckoo (1927), released a week after The Second Hundred Years.
- The Three Stooges would paint their prison uniforms black in 1941's So Long Mr. Chumps.

== The Sons of the Desert ==
Chapters of The Sons of the Desert, the international Laurel and Hardy Appreciation Society, called "Tents", all take their names from Laurel and Hardy films; there is a The Second Hundred Years Tent on Long Island, New York.
