= Sons of the Desert =

1933 film by William A. Seiter

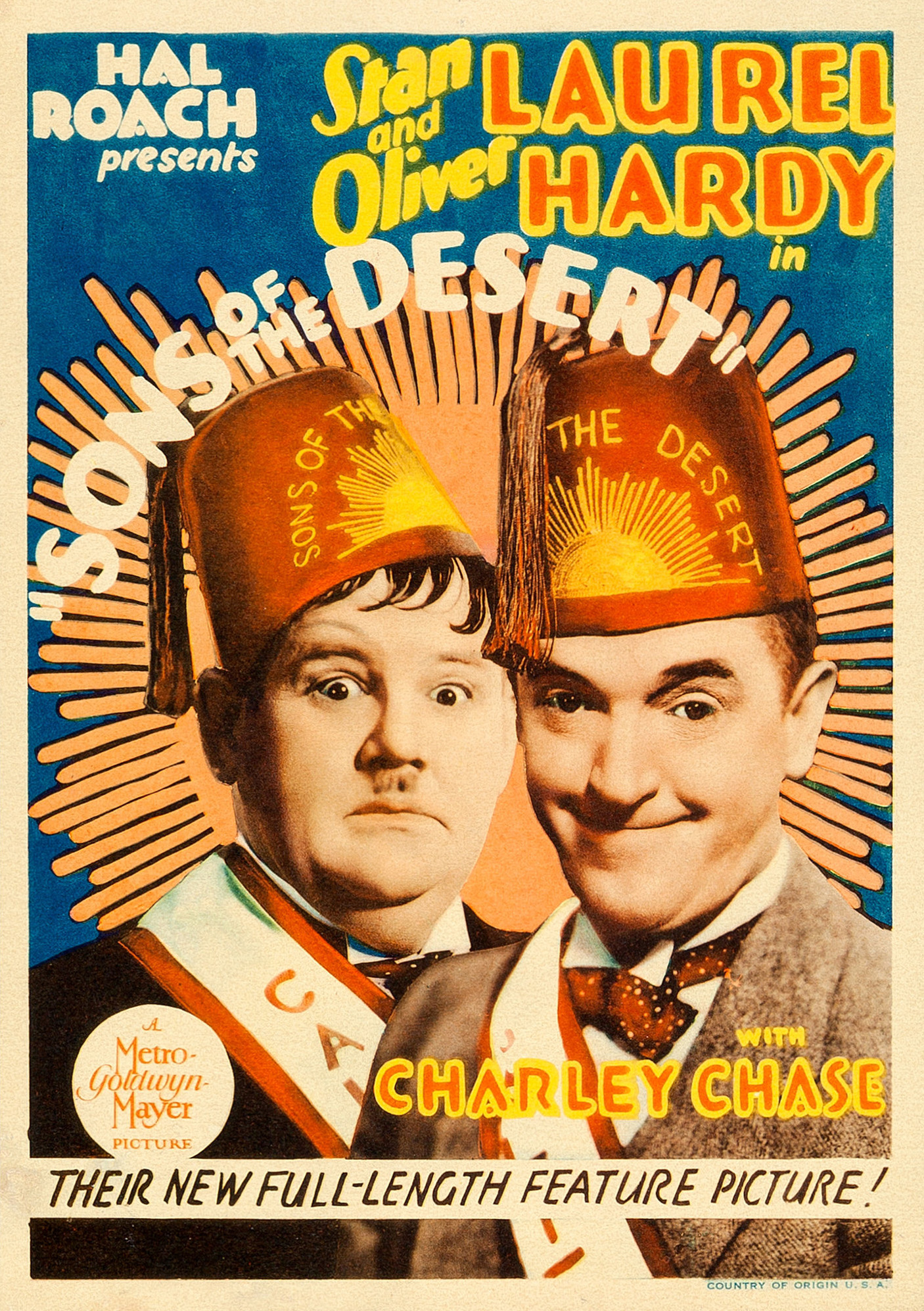
- Theatrical release window card
- Directed by: William A. Seiter
- Written by: Frank Craven; Byron Morgan (continuity)
- Produced by: Hal Roach
- Starring: Stan Laurel; Oliver Hardy; Charley Chase; Mae Busch; Dorothy Christy
- Cinematography: Kenneth Peach
- Edited by: Bert Jordan
- Music by: Marvin Hatley
- Production company: Hal Roach Studios
- Distributed by: Metro-Goldwyn-Mayer
- Release date: December 29, 1933 (U.S.)
- Running time: 64 minutes
- Country: United States
- Language: English

Sons of the Desert is a 1933 American pre-Code comedy film starring Laurel and Hardy. Directed by William A. Seiter, it was released in the United States on December 29, 1933. In the United Kingdom, the film was originally released under the title Fraternally Yours.

In 2012, the film was deemed "culturally, historically, or aesthetically significant" by the United States Library of Congress and selected for preservation in the National Film Registry.

== Plot ==
Mr. Laurel and Mr. Hardy belong to a fraternal lodge called Sons of the Desert. It is resolved that all members must attend the upcoming national convention in Chicago. While Oliver is eager to honor the oath no matter what his wife Lottie says, Stan is apprehensive that his own wife Betty won't allow it.

Upon return home, it is then revealed that Mrs. Hardy is vehemently against Oliver attending the convention as she has already planned a retreat to the mountains. To get out of it, Oliver pretends to be ill. Stan then arranges for a fake doctor (a vetenarian, who diagnoses Ollie with Double Canis Delirous) to prescribe a trip to Honolulu. Though Stan has initial permission from Betty to head to the convention, he is ultimately forced to go along with the trip to Honolulu to watch over Oliver. Laurel and Hardy leave for their trip, with their wives oblivious to the fact that they're really going to the convention.

The boys have a wonderful time at the convention, though Oliver almost bungles it when fellow conventioneer Charlie has him talk with his sister - Lottie Hardy - by phone. Little do they know that the ship returning from Honolulu is sinking in a typhoon. The wives become alarmed and go to the steamship office, where they learn that survivors have been picked up by a rescue ship which is set to arrive in 36 hours, while a list of casualties will be announced later. The wives go to a movie theater to watch the news to pass the time until the next report comes in -- and see their husbands in a newsreel covering the Sons of the Desert convention. Meanwhile Stan and Oliver return home to find their houses empty, only to learn there from a newspaper about the Honolulu liner sinking. Desperate to evade their spouses until the next day, they hide in the attic, but make so much noise that they have to escape from the house before the wives find them, resulting in them climbing up the roof while in their nightgowns during a thunderstorm, after which they climb down the drainpipe, intending to go to a hotel to spend the night there. However, a suspicious policeman turns them in at Hardy's front door.

Under pressure, Oliver tries to maintain the illusion that they were shipwreck survivors, but Betty quickly sees through the lie. Stan eventually confesses, which leads to relief from Betty and anger from Lottie. Betty is pleased to have won her earlier bet with Lottie about which husband was more honest, and rewards Stan with affection. Oliver, however, must face Lottie's fury, not only for the deception but also for embarrassing her in front of her friend, resulting in Oliver being bombarded with the entire household crockery.

== Cast ==
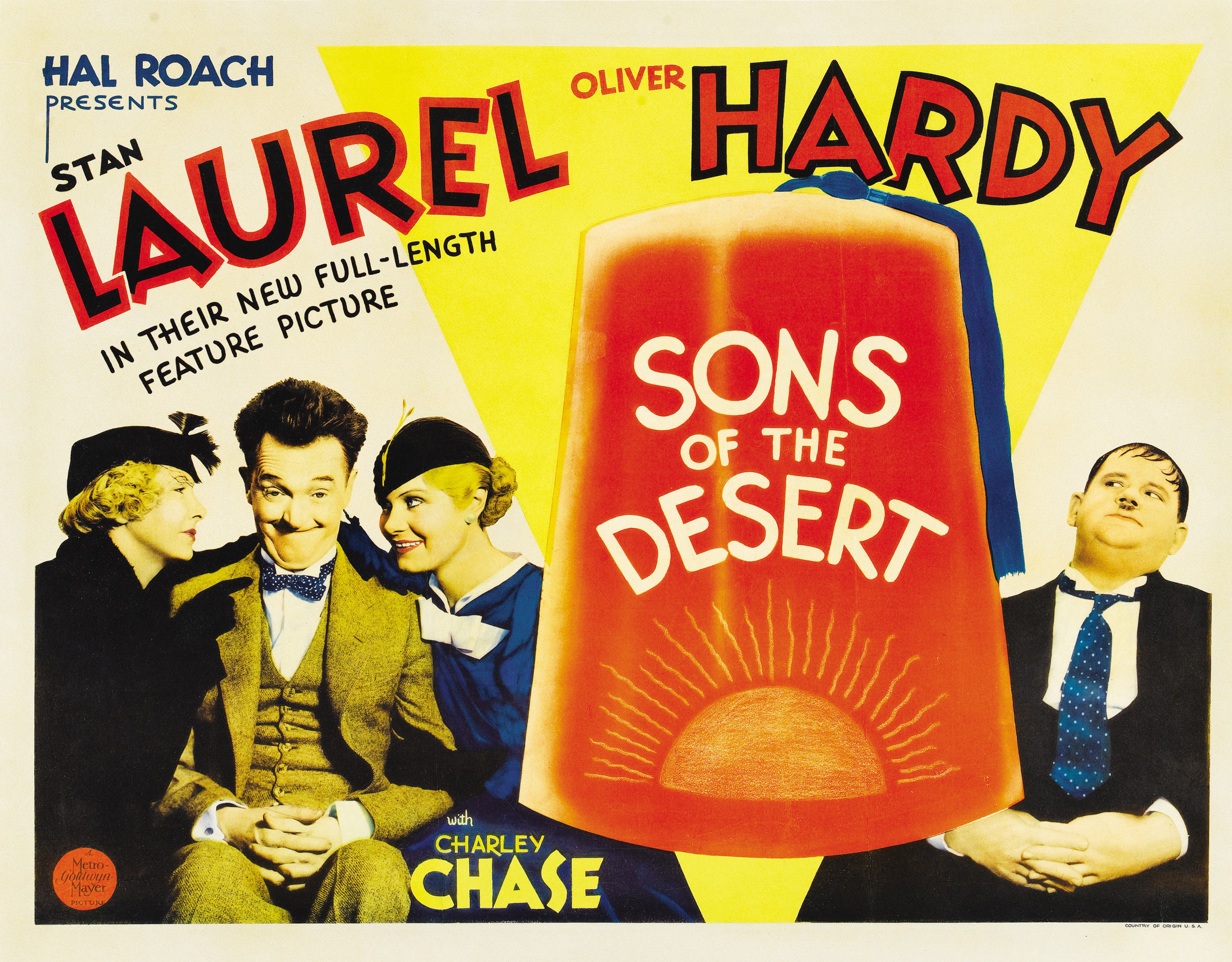
Half-sheet theatrical release poster

- Stan Laurel as Stan
- Oliver Hardy as Oliver
- Charley Chase as Charley Chase, conventioneer
- Mae Busch as Lottie, Hardy's wife and Charley's sister
- Dorothy Christy as Betty Laurel
- Lucien Littlefield as Dr. Horace Meddick, the Veterinarian
- John Elliott as the Exalted Ruler of the lodge
- Ty Parvis as the sailor in "Honolulu Baby" song and dance
- Charita Alden as the lead Hawaiian hula dancer (uncredited)
- Harry Bernard as Policeman
- Billy Gilbert as voice of Mr. Rutledge, announcing ship's report
- Robert Cummings as extra in light gray suit, listening to ship's report

== Reception ==
Sons of the Desert opened at Arthur Mayer's Rialto Theater in New York, usually a haven for horror pictures but always receptive to each new Laurel and Hardy comedy. A Motion Picture Herald reviewer was there: "At the Rialto theatre on Broadway in New York, the audience gave considerable and repeated evidence of definite enjoyment, chuckling at frequent intervals, laughing heartily on occasion. Slapstick comedy laughs there are aplenty, to judge by the Rialto audience." A reporter from the New York Herald Tribune attended the same screening and noticed that the Rialto "was crowded with ecstatic delegates who showed every sign of regarding themselves as being in an ideal world where there were two Chaplins working in one film." Film Daily commented, "This Hal Roach production is more than just an elongated two-reeler [short subject]. It is typical Laurel and Hardy tomfoolery, of course, but with a plot that sustains interest very nicely to the finish. And for the who want laughs, it is a generous feast." Motion Picture Daily covered the Hollywood preview and gave special credit to "William A. Seiter getting the most directorially out of a well constructed story. Seiter has the faculty of building up to a gag, giving it plenty, then letting down just long enough to deliver the next jolt."

Theater owners reported very good business. "A wow at the box-office. People flocked to see these two." (B. R. McLendon, Idabel, Oklahoma); "Well, the boys have done it, and I did not think they could. This latest of theirs is a knockout comedy. Better than ordinary business and that is saying something." (A. E. Hancock, Columbia City, Indiana); "The best feature from this team. It went over big here, as nearly everyone likes that kind of show." (Gladys E. McArdle, Lebanon, Kansas); "Best Laurel and Hardy to date. More story than usual and not so many repeats on the same gag." (C. M. Hartman, Carnegie, Oklahoma).

Sons of the Desert was re-released in 1947, after Laurel and Hardy had retired from the American screen: "Who was the dope that said Laurel and Hardy were washed up? What two comics in show business can pack so many good, clean laughs in 70 minutes as Laurel and Hardy? I ran this with a cartoon show to a capacity house, and it was thoroughly enjoyed by all -- even the ones who had to stand up in the rear." (Carl E. Pehlman, Edinburg, Illinois).

=== Contemporary response ===
Leonard Maltin gave it three and a half of four stars: "L&H's best feature film; duo sneaks off to fraternal convention without telling the wives; then the fun begins, with Chase as hilariously obnoxious conventioneer." Leslie Halliwell gave it one of his rare four of four stars: "Archetypal Laurel and Hardy comedy, unsurpassed for gags, pacing and sympathetic characterization."

== Awards and honors ==
The film is recognized by American Film Institute in these lists:

- 1998: AFI's 100 Years...100 Movies – Nominated
- 2000: AFI's 100 Years...100 Laughs – #96
- 2005: AFI's 100 Years...100 Movie Quotes:
  - Oliver: "Well, here's another nice mess you've gotten me into!" – #60
- 2007: AFI's 100 Years...100 Movies (10th Anniversary Edition) – Nominated

== Production notes ==
The fraternal organization seen in the film is styled to resemble the Shriners, known formerly as the Ancient Arabic Order of the Nobles of the Mystic Shrine, which is a club exclusive only to master masons of Freemasonry. Oliver Hardy was a freemason, and both Laurel and Hardy later became members of the Grand Order of Water Rats.

== Soundtrack ==
- "Honolulu Baby" – written by T. Marvin Hatley
- "Auld Lang Syne" – written by Robert Burns
- "We Are the Sons of the Desert" – written by Marvin Hatley
- "Tramp! Tramp! Tramp!" – music and lyrics by George Frederick Root

== Similar films ==
Laurel and Hardy had used the basic premise of playing truant from their wives in two short subjects: We Faw Down (1928), in which Ollie and Stan describe the vaudeville show they allegedly attended, unaware that the theater had burned down in the meantime; and Be Big! (1930), where Ollie feigns illness so he and Stan can attend their lodge's stag party.

== Legacy ==
The international Laurel and Hardy society The Sons of the Desert, established in 1965, takes its name from this feature film.

The title was also used as the name of a country group, as well as that of the Danish comedy quartet "Ørkenens sønner" (1991–present), the literal translation of the movie's title. The comedy group uses the basic theme of a fraternal organization, and their stage costumes are identical to the ones used in the movie's organization. Even their theme song is a translation of the one from the movie. Though adult themed, their gags and jokes resemble the ones seen at the movie's Chicago party.

== See also ==
- National Recovery Administration (NRA), the logo displayed at start of film
