= Richard C. Currier =

American film editor (1892–1984)

- Born: August 26, 1892; Denver, Colorado, United States
- Died: December 14, 1984 (aged 92); Lake Forest, California, United States
- Occupation: Film editor

Richard Carlton "Dick" Currier (August 26, 1892 – December 14, 1984) was an American film editor known principally for his work at Hal Roach Studios.

== Biography ==
Currier was born in Denver, Colorado. From 1920 to 1932 he was the head of the editing department at Hal Roach Studios. His contract ensured that his name appeared as editor on nearly every Hal Roach film released while he was head of the department, though the actual work was often done by other people. Most of the Laurel and Hardy films released by the company during this period were actually edited by Bert Jordan. After his work at Roach, Currier worked at Paramount Pictures and Monogram Pictures. He worked at Hal Roach Studios again for a short while before starting his own editing company. He died in Lake Forest, California at age 92.

Currier had been elected to membership in American Cinema Editors.

== Selected filmography ==
- White Eagle (1922)
- The Timber Queen (1922)
- Haunted Valley (1923)
- Ruth of the Range (1923)
- Buried Treasure (1926)
- Raggedy Rose (1926)
- Along Came Auntie (1926)
- The Desert's Toll (1926)
- The Valley of Hell (1927)
- Duck Soup (1927 film) (1927)
- Slipping Wives (1927)
- No Man's Law (1927)
- Love 'em and Weep (1927)
- Why Girls Love Sailors (1927)
- With Love and Hisses (1927)
- Sugar Daddies (1927)
- Olympic Games (1927)
- Leave 'Em Laughing (1928)
- You're Darn Tootin' (1928)
- Rainy Days (1928)
- Big Business (1929)
- Another Fine Mess (1930)
- Pardon Us (1931)
- The Music Box (1932)
- Pack Up Your Troubles (1932)
- Too Much Harmony (1933)
- Melody in Spring (1934)
- Many Happy Returns (1934)
- Elmer and Elsie (1934)
- People Will Talk (1935)
- Man on the Flying Trapeze (1935)
- Here Comes Cookie (1935)
- The Virginia Judge (1935)
- Woman Trap (1936)
- Till We Meet Again (1936)
- The Return of Sophie Lang (1936)
- Wives Never Know (1936)
- A Doctor's Diary (1937)
- King of the Zombies (1941)
- Tanks a Million (1941)
- Miss Polly (1941)
- Hay Foot (1942)
- Flying with Music (1942)
- Fall In (1942)
- The McGuerins from Brooklyn (1942)
- Taxi, Mister (1943)
- Yanks Ahoy (1943)
- Revenge of the Zombies (1943)
- Mystery of the 13th Guest (1943)
- Women in Bondage (1943)
- Lady, Let's Dance (1944)
- Hot Rhythm (1944)
- Detective Kitty O'Day (1944)
- Crazy Knights (1944)
- Forever Yours (1945)
- The Jade Mask (1945)
- Sunbonnet Sue (1945)
- China's Little Devils (1945)
- The Lawton Story (1949)
- Cattle Queen (1951)
- Secret of Outlaw Flats (1953)
- Border City Rustlers (1953)
- The Unearthly (1957)
- Daddy-O (1958)
- The Cosmic Man (1959)
