= Deslys =

Deslys is a surname. Notable people with the surname include:

- Charles Deslys (1821–1885), French writer
- Gaby Deslys (1881–1920) French dancer, singer, and actress
- Kay Deslys (1899–1974), British comedy actress in 1920s American films
- Lily Deslys, a stage name of Lili Damita (1904–1994), French actress
