= One Wild Ride =

1925 film

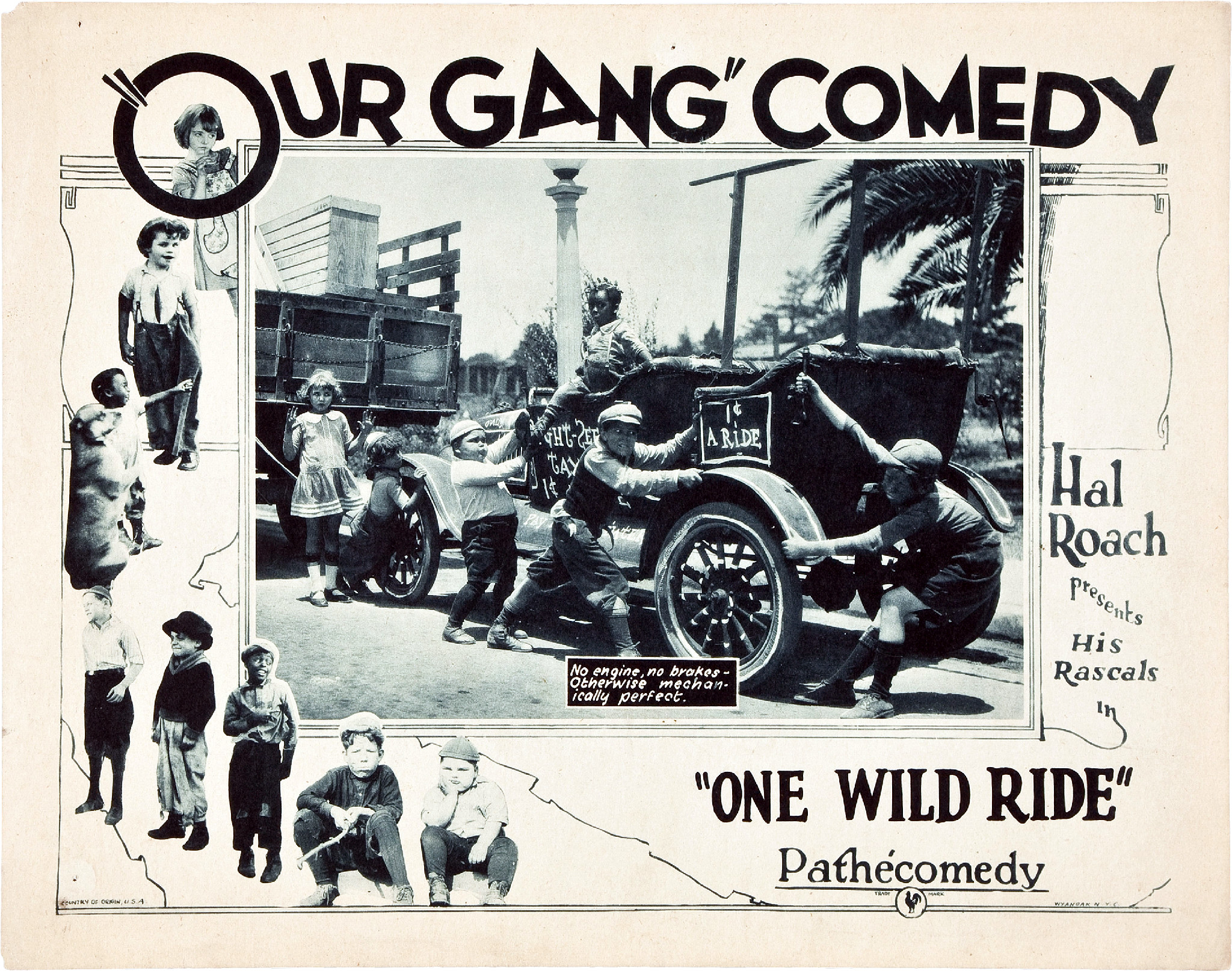
- Lobby card
- Directed by: Robert F. McGowan
- Written by: Hal Roach; H. M. Walker
- Produced by: Hal Roach; F. Richard Jones
- Edited by: Richard C. Currier
- Production company: Hal Roach Studios
- Distributed by: Pathé Exchange
- Release date: December 6, 1925
- Running time: 20 minutes
- Country: United States
- Language: Silent (English intertitles)

One Wild Ride is a 1925 short silent comedy film, the 45th in the Our Gang series, directed by Robert F. McGowan. It was remade in the 1932 short Free Wheeling.

== Plot ==
The gang has a taxi, consisting of an old Model T with no engine, pushed by a horse. When the owner reclaims his horse, they must rely on motorists to tow them to the top of the hill so that they can coast down. Little Farina borrows the car and it runs out of control all over town, causing mayhem everywhere that it goes.

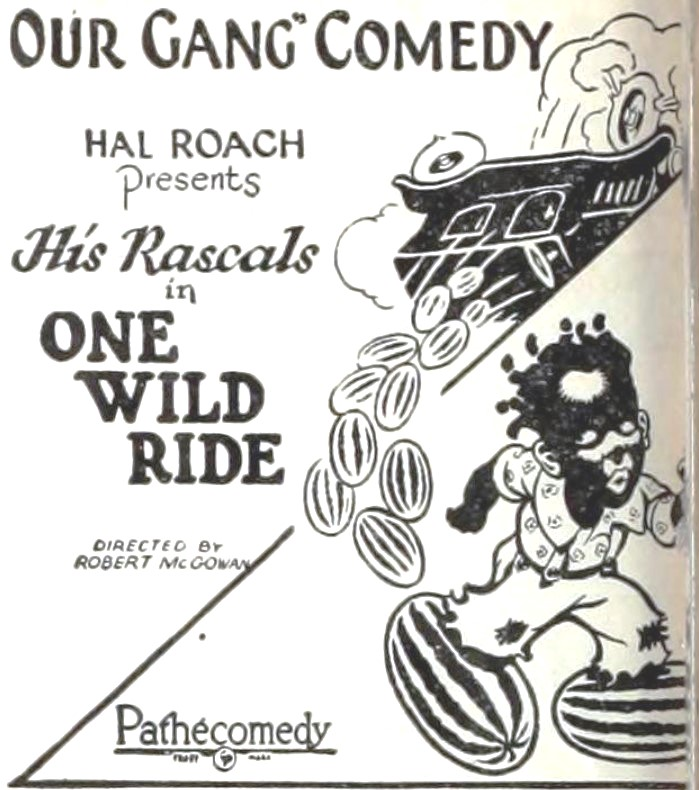
1925 print advertisement with watermelon stereotype.

== Cast ==
=== The Gang ===
- Joe Cobb as Joe
- Jackie Condon as Jackie
- Mickey Daniels as Mickey
- Johnny Downs as Johnnie
- Allen Hoskins as Farina
- Mary Kornman as Mary

=== Additional cast ===
- Jackie Hanes as Little Bellingham
- Unknown actress as Little girl
- Ed Brandenburg as Sprinter
- Richard Daniels as Johnnie's grandfather
- F. F. Guenste as Butler
- Al Hallett as Man with bird cage
- Fay Holderness as Governess
- Dorothy Vernon as Mickey's mother
- Pal the Dog as Himself

== See also ==
- Our Gang filmography
