= Wanda Perry =

American actress (1917–1985)

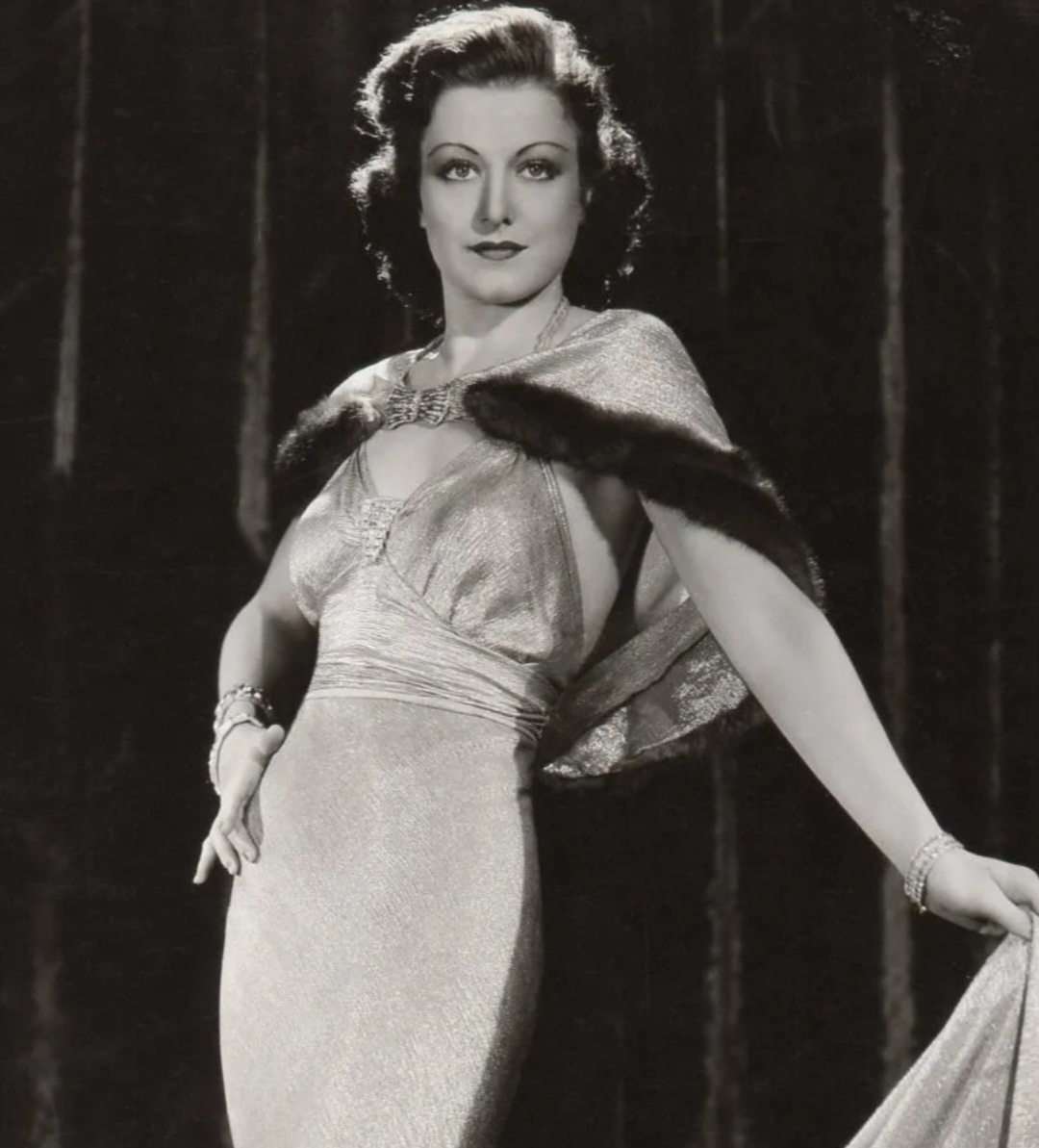
- Perry in 1930
- Born: Helen Marie Beuscher; July 23, 1917; Brooklyn, New York, U.S.
- Died: February 17, 1985 (aged 67); Hollywood, California, U.S.
- Occupation: Actress
- Years active: 1929–1974
- Spouse: Irving J. Browne (m. 1937)

Wanda Perry (born Helen Marie Beuscher; July 23, 1917 – February 17, 1985) was an American actress.

== Biography ==
Wanda Perry was born on July 23, 1917 in Brooklyn, New York City. She attended Manual Training High School in Brooklyn. She made her feature film debut at the age of sixteen as an Earl Carroll showgirl in Murder at the Vanities (1934) and was signed to a contract with MGM.

Perry starred in a number of feature films and film shorts, including several shorts with The Three Stooges.

She married dentist Dr. Irving J. Browne in 1937.

Wanda Perry died on February 17, 1985 in Hollywood.

== Filmography ==
- Bring on the Bride (1929)
- Murder at the Vanities (1934)
- Let's Talk It Over (1934)
- Romance in the Rain (1934)
- Kid Millions (1934)
- Roberta (1935)
- Broadway Melody of 1936 (1935)
- George White's 1935 Scandals (1935)
- Born to Dance (1936)
- The Great Ziegfeld (1936)
- Rosalie (1937)
- Thin Ice (1937)
- Second Fiddle (1939)
- Booby Dupes (1945)
- Crime Doctor's Man Hunt (1946)
- Pardon My Clutch (1948)
- Mummy's Dummies (1948)
- Follow the Sun (1951)
- Death of a Salesman (1951)
- Musty Musketeers (1954)
- Wham-Bam-Slam! (1955)
- Mame (1974)
