= Stage Fright (1923 film) =

1923 film

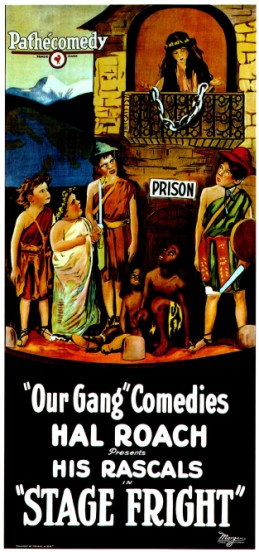
- Directed by: Robert F. McGowan
- Written by: Hal Roach; H. M. Walker
- Produced by: Hal Roach
- Starring: Joe Cobb; Jackie Condon; Mickey Daniels; Allen Hoskins; Mary Kornman; Ernie Morrison; Jack Davis; Ray Brooks; Richard Daniels; William Gillespie; Helen Gilmore; Clara Guiol; Jack Hill; Jannie Hoskins; Sam Lufkin; Louise Tordera; Charles Stevenson
- Distributed by: Pathé Exchange
- Release date: October 21, 1923
- Running time: 20 minutes
- Country: United States
- Languages: Silent film English intertitles

Stage Fright is the 18th entry in the Our Gang short subject comedy series. The series (later known as The Little Rascals) was created by Hal Roach in 1922, and continued production until 1944.

== Plot ==
Author Fawn Ochletree (Clara Guiol) stages a charity performance of her latest play, a Romanesque epic. The gang and other neighborhood kids are forced into starring in the play, much to the chagrin of the gang. They are unable to remember their lines, and struggle with maintaining their composure during the more serious moments of the melodrama. Finally, Jackie sets off a slew of firecrackers as the finale, scaring all involved.

== Production notes ==
Stage Fright was remade in 1930 during the sound era as Shivering Shakespeare.

When the television rights for the original silent Pathé Exchange/Our Gang comedies were sold to National Telepix and other distributors, several episodes were retitled. This film was released into TV syndication in 1960 as "Mischief Makers" under the title The School Play. Two-thirds of the original film was included. Deleted scenes from syndication include the dance sequence with Ernie and Farina.

== Cast ==
- Joe Cobb as Joe
- Jackie Condon as Jackie
- Mickey Daniels as Mickey
- Jack Davis as Jack
- Allen Hoskins as Farina
- Mary Kornman as Mary
- Ernie Morrison as Ernie

=== Additional cast ===
- Jannie Hoskins as Baby in audience
- Gabe Saienz as Boy at fruit stand
- Andy Samuel as Boy in audience
- Louise Tordera as Irma
- Ray Brooks as Audience Member
- Richard Daniels as Mickey's Father
- William Gillespie as Dalmar El Farov
- Helen Gilmore as Mickey's Mother
- Clara Guiol as Fawn Ochletree
- Jack Hill as Audience Member
- Sam Lufkin as Audience Member
- Charles Stevenson as Tony the Fruit Vendor
