= Election day (disambiguation) =

Election day is the day on which political elections are held.

By country:

- Election Day (United Kingdom), the day on which political elections are held in the United Kingdom
- Election Day (United States), the day set by law for the general elections of public officials in the United States
- Historical Russian election days
  - Russian Election Day, 2014
  - Russian Election Day, 2017

== Media ==
=== Film ===
- Election Day (1929 film), Our Gang short film
- Election Day (2007 film), Russian film

=== Television ===
- "Election Day Part I", episode 148 of The West Wing (TV series)
- "Election Day Part II", episode 149 of The West Wing (TV series)
- "Election Day" (Modern Family), the nineteenth episode of the third season of the American sitcom Modern Family

=== Literature ===
- "Election Day (short story)", a 2019 alternate history short story by Harry Turtledove

=== Music ===
- "Election Day" (song), a 1985 single by Arcadia
- "Election Day", a 1987 song by The Replacements, released as a B-side to the single "Alex Chilton"
- "Election Day", a 2017 song by Europe from the album Walk the Earth
