= Their Purple Moment =

1928 film

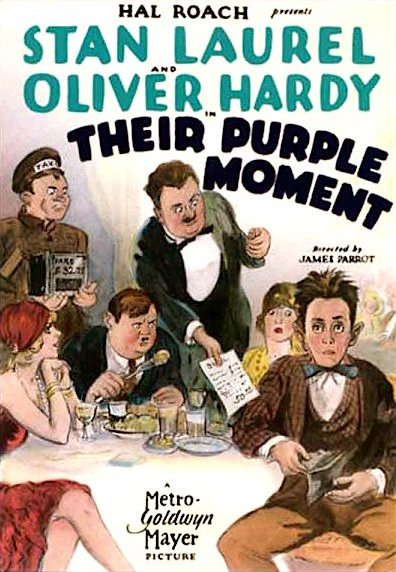
- Directed by: James Parrott; Fred Guiol (uncredited)
- Written by: H.M. Walker (titles)
- Produced by: Hal Roach
- Starring: Stan Laurel; Oliver Hardy; Anita Garvin; Kay Deslys; Fay Holderness; Tiny Sandford; Lyle Tayo; Leo Willis
- Cinematography: George Stevens
- Edited by: Richard C. Currier
- Distributed by: Metro-Goldwyn-Mayer
- Release date: May 18, 1928
- Running time: 22 minutes
- Country: United States
- Languages: Silent film English (Original intertitles)

Their Purple Moment is a silent short subject directed by James Parrott and Fred Guiol (who was uncredited) starring comedy duo Laurel and Hardy. It was released by Metro-Goldwyn-Mayer on May 18, 1928.

== Plot ==
Submissive husband Stan has clandestinely saved money from his thrifty wife. Upon discovering Stan's savings, Ollie proposes they utilize the funds for leisure. However, before they can embark on their escapade, Stan's wife intercepts the wallet, replacing the cash with cigar coupons. Oblivious to the substitution, Stan and Ollie venture to an upscale cafe where they witness two men being ejected for failing to settle their bill, prompting their dates to depart as well. Approaching Stan and Ollie, the women explain their predicament, leading the duo to offer payment for the bill and subsequent expenses, treating them to a lavish night out.

Their evening takes an unexpected turn when a meddlesome observer witnesses their interaction with the women and notifies their wives. Despite Stan's enjoyment of the entertainment, his joy is dampened upon realizing his wallet contains only cigar coupons. In a desperate attempt to stall, Stan instructs the cigarette girl to charge the purchases to his account. However, their evasion tactics fail, resulting in a confrontation with the irate headwaiter(who keeps tripping over them in the dark) and their furious wives. The evening culminates in a chaotic altercation, culminating in a pie-throwing melee in the restaurant's kitchen.

== Cast ==
Credited
- Stan Laurel as Stan Pincher
- Oliver Hardy as Ollie
- Kay Deslys as Stan's girlfriend
- Anita Garvin as Ollie's girlfriend
- Fay Holderness as Mrs. Pincher
- S.J. Sandford as Waiter
- Lyle Tayo as Mrs. Hardy
- Leo Willis as Cab driver

Uncredited

- Jack V. Lloyd as Cook
- Ed Brandenburg, Sam Lufkin, Gene Morgan as Waiters
- Dorothy Coburn as Hatcheck girl
- Harry Earles as Little Person performer
- Helen Gilmore, Retta Palmer, John B. O'Brien as Pink Pup patrons
- Jack Hill as Doorman/Pink Pup patron
- Patsy O'Byrne as Gossip
- Dorothea Wolbert as Waitress

== Production notes ==
A "purple moment" is an antiquated slang term that means "a defining moment in a person's life."

There was an alternate ending filmed where Stan and Ollie disguise themselves as "little people" and try to escape from the club on their hands and knees. A more traditional food fight was substituted.
