= Matt McHugh =

American actor (1894–1971)

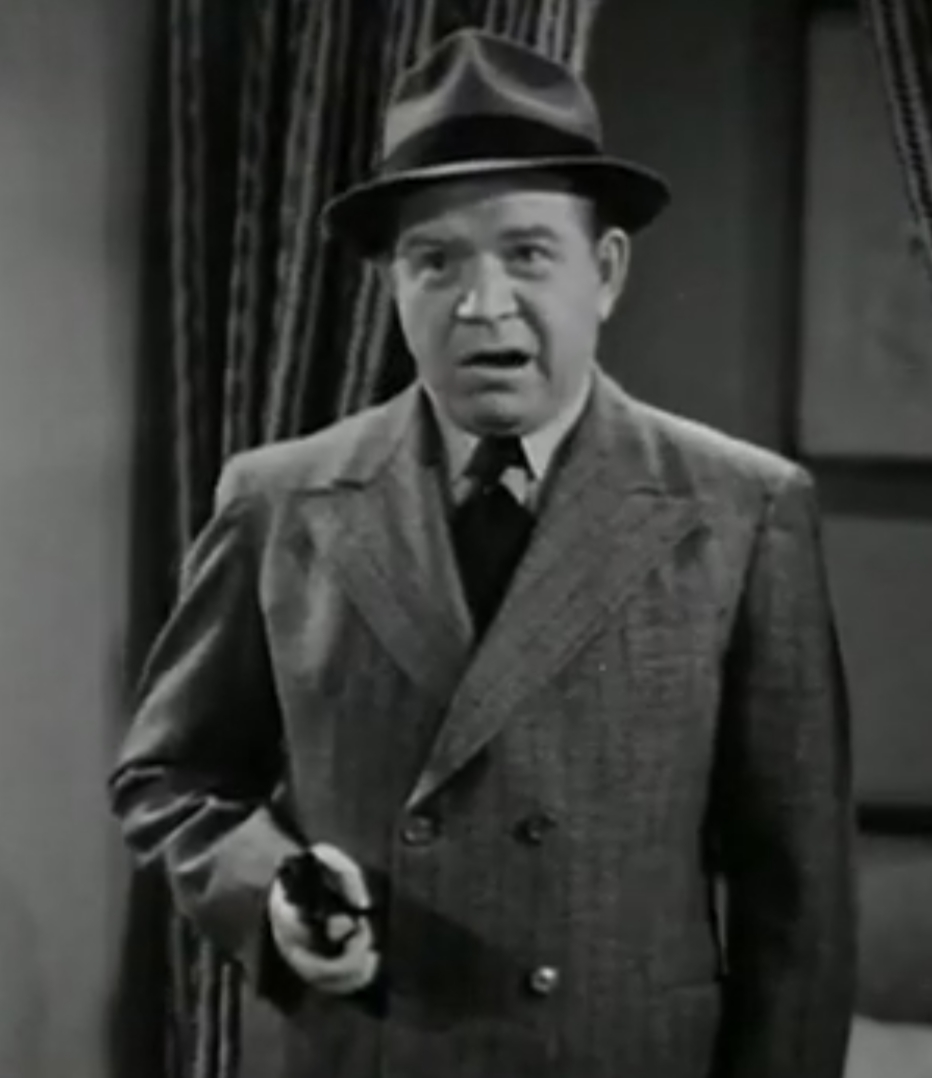
- McHugh in Too Many Women (1942)
- Born: Matthew O. McHugh; January 22, 1894
- Died: February 22, 1971 (aged 77)
- Occupation: Actor
- Years active: 1928–1954
- Relatives: Frank McHugh (brother); Kitty McHugh (sister)

Matthew O. McHugh (January 22, 1894 – February 22, 1971 ) was an American film actor who appeared in more than 200 films between 1931 and 1955, primarily in small parts.

== Career ==
McHugh came from a theatrical family. His parents ran a stock theatre company and, as a young child, he performed on stage. His brother, Frank, who went on to become part of the Warner Bros. stock company in the 1930s and 1940s, and sister Kitty performed an act with him by the time he was fourteen years old, but the family quit the stage around 1930. His brother Ed became an agent in New York.

McHugh made his Broadway debut in Elmer Rice's Street Scene in 1929, along with his brother Ed, and also appeared in Swing Your Lady in 1936.

Despite his actual origins, McHugh usually performed his roles with a Brooklyn accent, and was often cast as characters explicitly from Brooklyn. In Star Spangled Rhythm (1941), his one scene is a protracted monologue during the climactic "Old Glory" sequence, in which McHugh plays a character who literally embodies the spirit of Brooklyn.

== Partial filmography ==
- Street Scene (1931) as Vincent Jones
- The Woman from Monte Carlo (1932) as Chief Petty Officer Vincent
- Freaks (1932) as One of the Rollo Brothers
- The Loud Mouth (1932) as Loud Mouth
- Hypnotized (1932) as Drummer
- The Devil's Brother (1933) as Francesco
- Bed of Roses (1933) as "Jones"
- The Last Trail (1933) as Looney McGann
- The Mad Game (1933) as McGee
- The Prizefighter and the Lady (1933) as Bar Patron
- Lost in the Stratosphere (1934) as Matt O'Toole
- She Loves Me Not (1934) as Andy
- The Cat's-Paw (1934) as Taxi Driver
- Murder in the Private Car (1934) as Policeman Stopping John (uncredited)
- Wings in the Dark (1935)
- Ladies Crave Excitement (1935)
- Party Wire (1935) as Bert West
- If You Could Only Cook (1935) as Pete
- Mannequin (1937)
- The Big Broadcast of 1937 (1937) as a Cafe diner (uncredited)
- The Mad Miss Manton (1938) as Driscoll "from Headquarters"
- Mr. Smith Goes to Washington (1939) (uncredited)
- The Boys from Syracuse (1940)
- The Wild Man of Borneo (1941) as Buggy Driver
- Don't Talk (1942, Short) as Plant Employee
- A Gentleman at Heart (1942)
- Sappy Birthday (1942)
- San Diego, I Love You (1944)
- Secret Command (1944)
- Vacation in Reno (1945)
- Pardon My Clutch (1948)
- Bodyhold (1949)
- Wham Bam Slam (1955)
