= Fay Holderness =

American actress (1881–1963)

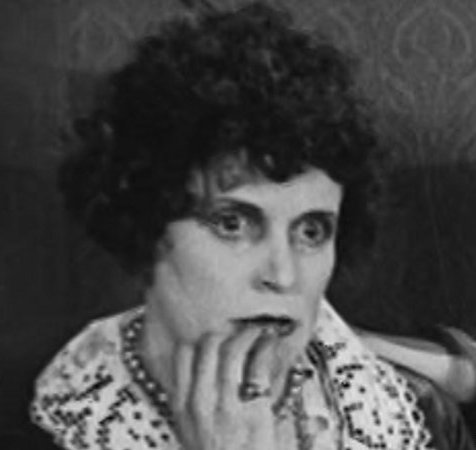
- Born: Fay MacMurray; April 16, 1881; Oconto, Wisconsin, U.S.
- Died: May 13, 1963 (aged 82); Santa Monica, California, U.S.
- Occupations: Vaudeville performer; film actress
- Spouses: Francis C. Holderness; Edmund Ayars Leeds
- Relatives: Fred MacMurray (nephew)

Fay Holderness (née MacMurray; April 16, 1881 – May 13, 1963) was an American vaudeville performer and film actress.

== Family ==
Fay Holderness was born Fay MacMurray in Oconto, Wisconsin, the daughter of Thomas James MacMurray and Mary E. MacMurray (née Barnes). Her father was a prominent organist and her brother, Frederick MacMurray, was a respected violinist and a composer, whose son was actor and businessman Fred MacMurray.

The family left Wisconsin in the late 1880s, living in Ohio, Michigan, and later Illinois.

== Career ==
Holderness performed in a vaudeville production in Olean, New York in 1920, a presentation of The Village Four. Three actors along with Holderness appeared in this comedy and harmony singing skit. She performed in silent movie productions as early as 1917. In 1919, Holderness was in the cast of Hearts of the World, directed by D.W. Griffith. The film was shot on location in France over a period of eighteen months. Other actors in the movie are Lillian Gish, Dorothy Gish, Kate Bruce, and George Fawcett.

Holderness was in the cast of Dick Turpin (1925). This tale of romance and adventure was set in old England. The film featured Tom Mix, Philo McCullough, and Alan Hale, Sr.

She appeared in many short comedies, including several with Laurel and Hardy, playing Mrs. Laurel in Their Purple Moment (1928), and Mrs. Hardy in Hog Wild (1930). She also supported W. C. Fields in The Barber Shop (1933) and The Bank Dick (1940). Her career continued into the era of sound film. Holderness' last credited screen roles are for Share The Wealth (1936) and Just Speeding (1936). Her uncredited parts take her career into the 1950s. Among these are parts in The Pride of the Yankees (1942) and The Mummy's Ghost (1944).

== Personal life ==
In 1912, she married Francis C. Holderness in Detroit.

She married Edmund Ayars Leeds on August 25, 1923. Fay Holderness died in 1963 at the Pacific Convalarium in Santa Monica, California, age 82.

== Partial filmography ==
- Hearts of the World (1918) - The Innkeeper
- Bright and Early (1918, Short) - A Maid
- Playmates (1918, Short)
- Hello Trouble (1918, Short) - A foxy spinster
- The Secret Garden (1919) - Mrs. Medlock
- Maggie Pepper (1919) - Mrs. Thatcher
- Men, Women, and Money (1919) - Mrs. Parkton
- The Right to Happiness (1919) - Leah - the Nurse
- Blind Husbands (1919) - The 'Vamp' Waitress
- Distilled Love (1920, Short)
- The Flaming Disc (1920) - Stella Dean
- The Last Man on Earth (1924) - Elmer's Mother
- Ladies to Board (1924)
- Dick Turpin (1925) - Barmaid (uncredited)
- Should Sailors Marry? (1925, Short) - Verbena Singlefoot
- One Wild Ride (1925, Short)
- Baby Clothes (1926)
- Up in Mabel's Room (1926) - Tiny (Mabel's maid) (uncredited)
- Salvation Jane (1927) - Captain Carrie Brown
- Ten Years Old (1927)
- Should Men Walk Home? (1927) (uncredited)
- Call of the Cuckoo (1927, Short) - Party Guest (uncredited)
- Their Purple Moment (1928, Short) - Mrs. Pincher
- Lonesome (1928) - Overdressed Woman
- Bear Shooters (1930, Short) - Spud's Mother (uncredited)
- Hog Wild (1930, Short) - Mrs. Hardy (uncredited)
- The Barber Shop (1933, Short) - Little Girl's Mother (uncredited)
- Ann Vickers (1933) - Prison Matron (uncredited)
- Whom the Gods Destroy (1934) - Balkan Passenger (uncredited)
- Among the Missing (1934) - Police Matron (uncredited)
- Flirtation (1934) - Woman on a Window (uncredited)
- Ginger (1935) - Gossip (uncredited)
- Music Is Magic (1935) - Bus Passenger (uncredited)
- Mr. Deeds Goes to Town (1936) - Nurse (uncredited)
- Dangerous Holiday (1937) - Old Maid (uncredited)
- Youth on Parole (1937) - Interviewer (uncredited)
- Let Us Live (1939) - Theatre Scrubwoman (uncredited)
- Zenobia (1939) - Townswoman (uncredited)
- Torchy Blane.. Playing with Dynamite (1939) - Prison matron (uncredited)
- Spring Parade (1940) - Townswoman (uncredited)
- The Bank Dick (1940) - Lady Passerby (uncredited)
- Honky Tonk (1941) - Bricklayer (uncredited)
- The Pride of the Yankees (1942) - Spectator (uncredited)
- Hers to Hold (1943) - Mrs. Kitnacker (uncredited)
- The Mummy's Ghost (1944) - Policewoman (uncredited)
- The Greatest Show on Earth (1952) - Spectator (uncredited)
- Here Come the Girls (1953) - Washwoman (uncredited) (final film role)

== Sources ==
- Appleton, Wisconsin Post-Crescent, Dick Turpin, Wednesday Evening, February 3, 1926, Page 7.
- Clearfield, Pennsylvania Progress, Hearts of the World, February 6, 1919, Page 3.
- Olean Evening Herald, Dorothy Phillips At Palace The Right To Happiness, January 5, 1920, Page 4.
