= Very Confidential =

1927 film

- Directed by: James Tinling
- Screenplay by: Randall Faye
- Story by: Randall Faye; James Kevin McGuinness
- Starring: Madge Bellamy; Patrick Cunning; Mary Duncan; Joseph Cawthorn; Marjorie Beebe; Isabelle Keith
- Cinematography: Joseph August
- Production company: Fox Film Corporation
- Distributed by: Fox Film Corporation
- Release date: November 6, 1927
- Running time: 60 minutes
- Country: United States
- Language: English

Very Confidential is a 1927 American comedy film directed by James Tinling, written by Randall Faye, and starring Madge Bellamy, Patrick Cunning, Mary Duncan, Joseph Cawthorn, Marjorie Beebe and Isabelle Keith. It was released on November 6, 1927, by Fox Film Corporation.

== Cast ==
- Madge Bellamy as Madge Murphy
- Patrick Cunning as Roger Allen
- Mary Duncan as Priscilla Travers
- Joseph Cawthorn as Donald Allen
- Marjorie Beebe as Stella
- Isabelle Keith as Adelaide Melbourne
- Carl von Haartman as Chauffeur
