= Below the Sea =

1933 film directed by Albert S. Rogell

- Film poster
- Directed by: Albert S. Rogell
- Screenplay by: Jo Swerling
- Story by: Jo Swerling
- Starring: Fay Wray; Ralph Bellamy
- Cinematography: Joseph Walker
- Edited by: Jack Dennis
- Music by: C. Bakaleinikoff
- Distributed by: Columbia Pictures
- Release date: March 29, 1933
- Running time: 78 minutes
- Country: United States
- Language: English

Below the Sea is a 1933 American Pre-Code action film directed by Albert S. Rogell and starring Fay Wray, Ralph Bellamy and Esther Howard.

== Plot summary ==
After a German U-boat is sunk near the end of World War I, its captain, the only living member of the crew 15 years later, plots to retrieve the gold bullion that went down with the boat. He enlists the financial help of a woman who owns a waterfront dive and a world-renowned undersea diver, but when the ship the woman bankrolls sinks the two men sign on to an expedition bankrolled by another woman—this time with scientific knowledge being her motive. They plan to use the expedition's equipment to dive to the wreck and bring up the gold.

== Cast ==
- Ralph Bellamy as Steve McCreary
- Fay Wray as Diana Templeton
- Frederick Vogeding as Von Boulton - Karl Schlemmer
- Esther Howard as Lily
- Paul Page as Jackson
- A. Trevor Addinsell as Waldridge
- William J. Kelly as Dr. Chapman
