= Should Sailors Marry? =

1925 film

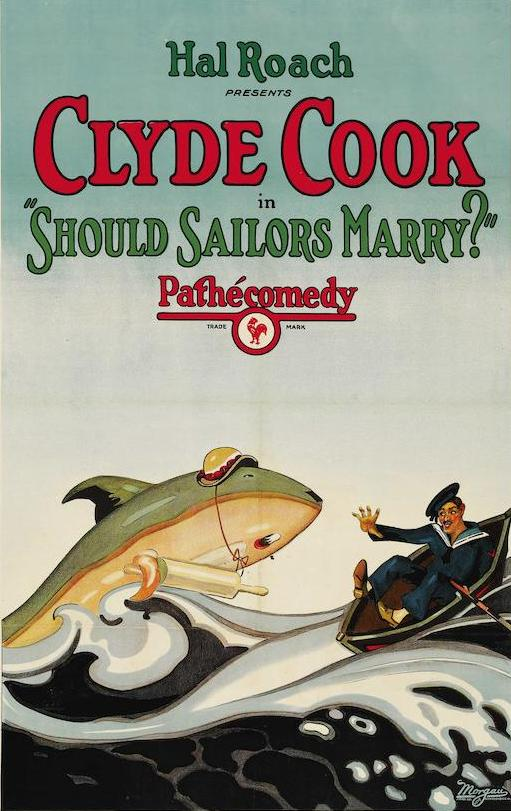
- Film poster
- Directed by: Jess Robbins
- Written by: Jess Robbins; H. M. Walker
- Produced by: Hal Roach
- Starring: Oliver Hardy
- Cinematography: R. H. Weller
- Edited by: Richard C. Currier; Jess Robbins
- Distributed by: Pathé Exchange
- Release date: November 8, 1925
- Running time: 22 minutes
- Country: United States
- Language: Silent (English intertitles)

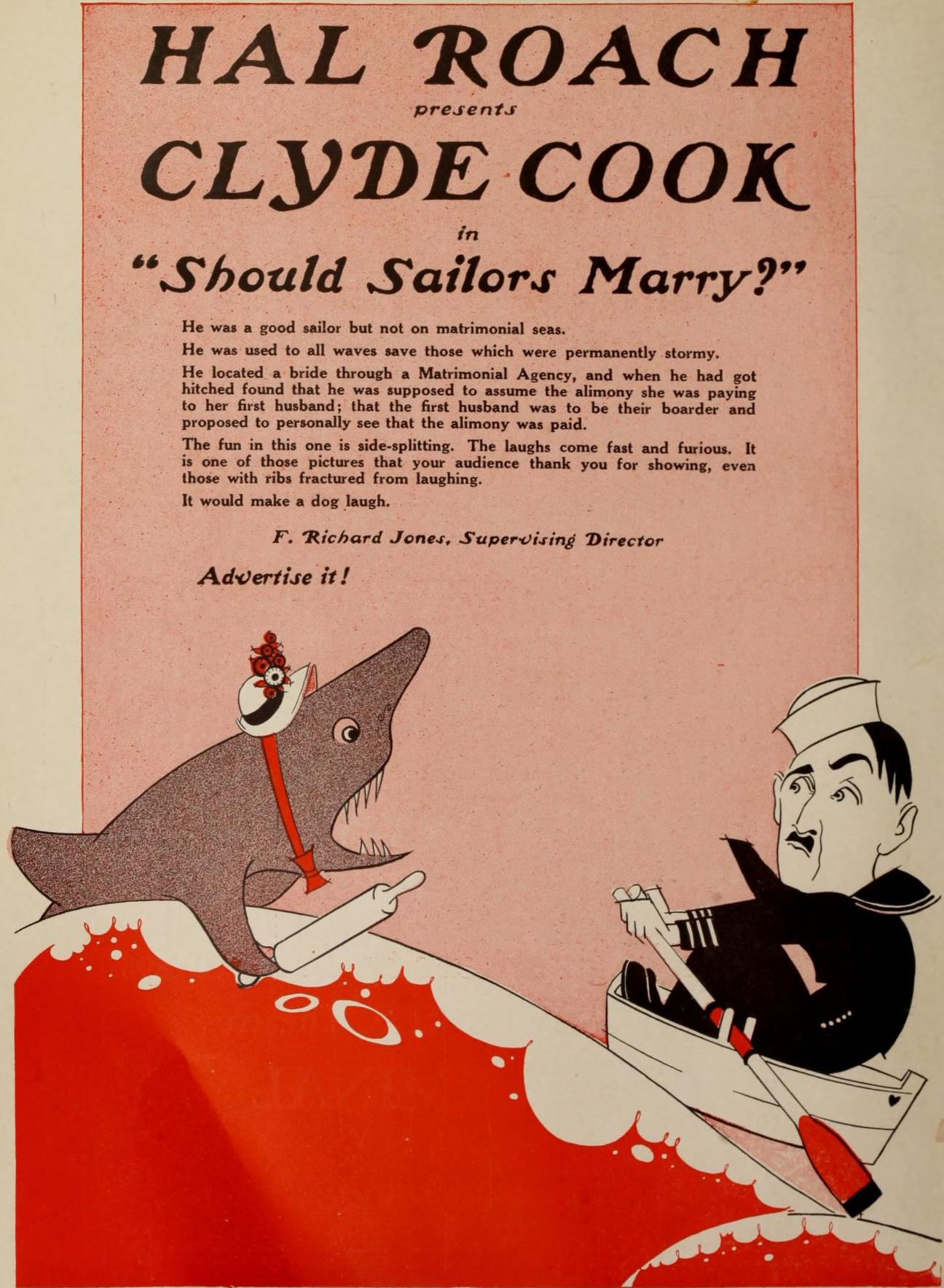
Should Sailors Marry? advertisement in 14 November 1925 issue of Moving Picture World

Should Sailors Marry? is a 1925 American silent comedy film featuring Clyde Cook and Oliver Hardy.

== Plot ==
A wife waits for her brawling sailor ex-husband. His friends sneer at him for ever being married. She has come to claim back alimony.

Cyril is returning home after four years on a submarine. He is on a train going to visit Verbena Singlefoot, a sturdy widow with whom he has been corresponding. She owns her building and takes in boarders. She won a beauty prize 22 years previously in the 1893 Chicago World Fair.

He puts on his overcoat to leave the train but two men are trying to put on the same coat. He opens the carriage window and sees Verbena outside, he leans out to hug her then passes his bags out of the window and exits there instead of the door. They marry and go home. The ex-husband loiters at the entrance.

He is introduced to her son, a bratty young teenager dressed as a cowboy, who demands that Cyril dances the "bagpipe" (meaning hornpipe). He fires his guns at Cyril's feet to make him dance. When the boy seems to lose interest and wanders off he goes to check and has his cap shot off.

He is then introduced to his new daughter, Smyrna, a precocious girl of around 16. Smyrna gives him a sexy wink. Sitting on hot curling tongs sets Cyril into another hornpipe. The ex-husband appears and is kicked on the chin in Cyril's enthusiastic dance. Smyrna asks, "Did he hurt you Daddy?" and Cyril asks Verbena for an explanation.

On their wedding night, he puts on his nightgown and nightcap. He hides in the bed and does not realise that it is the ex-husband getting in, not Verbena. They fight over the covers before Cyril spots his mistake. Verbena comes in and checks his pockets for money. She cries when he says he has none. The ex-husband tells him he will have to work to pay him his alimony. He dreams of wrestling him then they actually wrestle.. The ex-husband is twice his size but he nimbly escapes his grabs and blows.

The doctor arrives with an assistant to check him for life insurance, interrupting his first day's work sharpening tools. They check his heart and blood pressure. The doctor does not pay attention and over-inflates the blood pressure band, bursting it. He is pronounced "perfect" but the doctor wants to operate "just for the experience". They try to strip him and he resists. The doctor agrees a $25,000 policy payable to Verbena. Calamities instantly begin on a steel construction of a skyscraper many floors up. He escapes into a passing hot air balloon advertising Reno Soap. He cuts the tether to escape. He throws out a sand bag and hits the ex-husband, dropping him off the steelwork.

Cyril indicates he is going to Reno.

== Cast ==
- Clyde Cook as Cyril D'Armond
- Noah Young as The ex-husband
- Fay Holderness as Verbena Singlefoot (the new wife)
- Martha Sleeper as Smyrna
- Oliver Hardy as Doctor
- Sammy Brooks as Doctor's short assistant
- William Gillespie as Train passenger
- Helen Gilmore as Train passenger

== See also ==
- List of American films of 1925
