= Hog Wild (1930 film) =

1930 film

- Title card
- Directed by: James Parrott
- Written by: H. M. Walker; Stan Laurel
- Produced by: Hal Roach
- Starring: Stan Laurel; Oliver Hardy; Fay Holderness; Dorothy Granger
- Cinematography: George Stevens
- Edited by: Richard Currier
- Music by: William Axt; Hal Roach
- Production company: Hal Roach Studios
- Distributed by: Metro-Goldwyn-Mayer
- Release date: May 31, 1930
- Running time: 19:22
- Country: United States
- Language: English

Hog Wild is a 1930 American pre-Code Laurel and Hardy film, directed by James Parrott.

== Plot ==
Ollie is embroiled in a futile search for his missing hat, initially accusing his wife of misplacing it until the absurdity dawns on him as he gazes into the mirror, revealing the hat perched atop his own head.

As Ollie endeavors to join Stan for a leisurely afternoon, his domestic tranquility is abruptly disrupted by his wife's insistence on his long-neglected task of installing a radio antenna atop their roof. Stan arrives on the scene, offering his assistance to Ollie's chagrin. However, their attempts at home improvement quickly devolve into a series of calamitous mishaps, with Hardy inadvertently demolishing his chimney and enduring multiple falls from the roof.

Undeterred by adversity, the duo resorts to unconventional means, positioning a ladder within the confines of Stan's vehicle. Yet, their plans unravel disastrously as the car careens uncontrollably through city streets, with Ollie precariously perched atop the ladder. Matters escalate further when Mrs. Hardy intervenes, joining the chaotic fray as they endeavor to navigate their way home amidst Laurel's frantic attempts to restart the malfunctioning vehicle, including inadvertently sounding the horn, drawing the attention of bystanders.

The climax of the chaos unfolds with the ominous approach of a speeding trolley car, culminating in an offscreen collision that leaves the car irreparably mangled, resembling an accordion. Undeterred by their misfortune, the trio concludes their journey homeward in the wreckage of their ill-fated vehicle.

== Cast ==
- Stan Laurel as Stan
- Oliver Hardy as Ollie
- Fay Holderness as Mrs. Naomi Hardy
- Dorothy Granger as Tillie, the Hardys' maid

== Production notes ==
Like other Laurel and Hardy films of this period, Hog Wild was refilmed in both Spanish and French versions in which Laurel and Hardy spoke phonetically the respective languages; the part of Mrs. Hardy was recast with, respectively, Linda Loredo and Yola d'Avril. The French version was titled Pele Mele; the Spanish version Radio Mania. In the UK, the film was retitled Aerial Antics, as Hog Wild was an American idiomatic expression. The film is the first to feature a music score throughout. The scoring is experimental and one of the first to use pieces written by Leroy Shield. The Our Gang series was also beginning to use background music but opted to use orchestral scorings initially and began mixing several Shield tunes on the last episode of the 1929-30 season, A Tough Winter.

The short was computer-colorized in 1986.

Mr. Hardy's "house" was actually a set built on the then vacant lot of 4175 Madison Avenue in Culver City, California.

The last scenes were filmed on the campus of the University of Southern California. Stan makes a left turn from Exposition Boulevard onto University Avenue, where the streetcar tracks and USC's Mudd Hall of Philosophy, with its distinctive curved façade, are seen. (At the time of filming in 1930, University Avenue was open to public traffic and the University Line streetcar ran along its entire length from Hoover Street to Exposition Boulevard.) The final crash happens in front of the University Branch of the Los Angeles Public Library (on actual trolley tracks), at the intersection of Hoover Street and 34th Street in Los Angeles, California, at the North edge of the campus.
