= Musty Musketeers =

1954 American short film by Jules White

- Directed by: Jules White
- Screenplay by: Jack White
- Story by: Felix Adler
- Produced by: Jules White
- Starring: Moe Howard; Larry Fine; Shemp Howard; Vernon Dent; Virginia Hunter; Philip Van Zandt; Heinie Conklin; Diana Darrin; Sherry O'Neil; Joe Palma; Wanda Perry; Norma Randall; Ruth White
- Cinematography: Gert Andersen
- Edited by: Edwin H. Bryant
- Distributed by: Columbia Pictures
- Release date: May 13, 1954 (U.S.)
- Running time: 15:55
- Country: United States
- Language: English

Musty Musketeers is a 1954 short subject directed by Jules White starring American slapstick comedy team The Three Stooges (Moe Howard, Larry Fine and Shemp Howard). It is the 154th entry in the series released by Columbia Pictures starring the comedians, who released 190 shorts for the studio between 1934 and 1959.

The film depicts a trio of fiddlers as court musicians in the court of the Old King Cole, traditionally identified with the 4th-century Romano-British leader Coel Hen. They are asked to perform in the springtime nuptials of Princess Alicia, but Alicia is kidnapped by an evil magician. The musicians confront the kidnapper in a swordfight, partially to ensure their own freedom.

== Plot ==
The Stooges serve as fiddlers at the court of the Old King Cole who are subject to a decree from the monarch that prohibits their marital unions until the forthcoming nuptials between Princess Alicia and Prince Gallant III of Rhododendron, scheduled to coincide with the springtime bloom of flowers. The malicious designs of the malevolent magician Murgatroyd disrupt this arrangement as he orchestrates the abduction of Princess Alicia for his own matrimonial aspirations.

Amidst their endeavors to attend to their equine companions by fitting them with new horseshoes, the Stooges inadvertently stumble upon the captive Princess Alicia, ensnared and silenced within the confines of the castle floor. In a parallel stratagem, Murgatroyd secures the consent of King Cole to his matrimonial intentions under the condition that he successfully retrieves the abducted princess. Employing subterfuge, Moe and Larry manipulate the castle guards, causing a diversion that facilitates Shemp's liberation of the princess.

Their triumph is ephemeral, however, as the Stooges, along with Princess Alicia, are soon ensnared by the machinations of Murgatroyd and his accomplices. In a bid for freedom, the Stooges ascend a rope ladder concealed within a magic box, inadvertently enduring the maleficent implements wielded by Murgatroyd in his attempt to thwart their escape. The box ultimately succumbs to the strain, precipitating the Stooges' descent just as Princess Alicia arrives to reveal her abductor's identity.

A conflict ensues, marked by a display of swordsmanship, as the Stooges confront Murgatroyd. Ultimately, the Stooges prevail, securing victory and clearing the path for their marriages to their respective sweethearts.

== Cast ==
=== Credited ===
- Moe Howard as Moe
- Larry Fine as Larry
- Shemp Howard as Shemp
- Vernon Dent as King Cole
- Philip Van Zandt as Mergatroyd the Magician

=== Uncredited ===
- Virginia Hunter as Princess Alicia (stock footage)
- Wanda Perry as Princess Alicia
- Heinie Conklin as Guard
- Johnny Kascier as Guard
- Joe Palma as Lancier the Captain of the Guard
- Frank Sully as King's aide
  - Al Thompson as King's aide (stock footage)
- Norma Randall as Millieth
- Ruth White as Lillieth
- Diana Darrin as Tillieth
- Sherry O'Neil as Showgirl
- Cy Schindell as Fat Guard (stock footage)

== Production notes ==
Musty Musketeers is a remake of 1948's Fiddlers Three, using ample recycled footage. The short's new scenes include a marriage proposal at the beginning with their sweethearts, as well as those at the end with a comic sword fight with actor Philip Van Zandt. Hunter was unavailable for the new footage, so she was replaced by Wanda Perry, who holds a fan over her face. New footage was shot on April 27, 1953.

== Quote ==
- Moe (to Shemp): "Thou art the matzohead!"
