= Baby Clothes =

1926 film

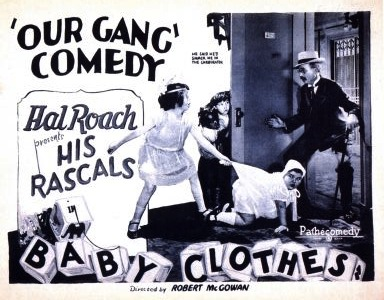
- Lobby card
- Directed by: Robert F. McGowan
- Produced by: Hal Roach; F. Richard Jones
- Edited by: Richard C. Currier
- Distributed by: Pathé Exchange
- Release date: April 25, 1926
- Running time: 20 minutes
- Country: United States
- Language: Silent with English intertitles

Baby Clothes is a 1926 American short silent comedy film, the 49th in the Our Gang series, directed by Robert F. McGowan.

== Cast ==
- Joe Cobb as Joe
- Jackie Condon as Jackie
- Mickey Daniels as Mickey
- Johnny Downs as Johnny
- Allen Hoskins as Farina
- Mary Kornman as Mary
- Pal the Dog as himself

=== Additional cast ===
- Gabe Saienz as Tough kid
- Bobby Young as Kid fighting Joe
- Ed Brandenburg as Bellboy
- Harry Earles as The midget
- William Gillespie as William Weedle
- Helen Gilmore as Joe's mother
- Charlie Hall as Bellboy
- Fay Holderness as Midget's guardian
- Charlotte Mineau as Mrs. Weedle
- William Orlamond as Rich uncle
- Lee Phelps as man listening to Irish joke
- Tiny Sandford as House detective
- Rolfe Sedan as man telling Irish joke
- Martha Sleeper as Leggy lady
