= Wham Bam Slam =

1955 American short film by Jules White

Wham-Bam-Slam!
- Directed by: Jules White; Edward Bernds (stock footage)
- Written by: Felix Adler
- Produced by: Jules White
- Starring: Moe Howard; Larry Fine; Shemp Howard; Matt McHugh; Wanda Perry; Alyn Lockwood; Doria Revier
- Cinematography: Fred Jackman Jr.
- Edited by: Paul Borofsky
- Distributed by: Columbia Pictures
- Release date: September 1, 1955 (U.S.)
- Running time: 15:54
- Country: United States
- Language: English

Wham-Bam-Slam! is a 1955 short subject directed by Jules White starring American slapstick comedy team The Three Stooges (Moe Howard, Larry Fine and Shemp Howard). It is the 164th entry in the series released by Columbia Pictures starring the comedians, who released 190 shorts for the studio between 1934 and 1959.

== Plot ==
Shemp's prolonged ailment, stemming from a persistent toothache, prompts the Stooges' acquaintance Claude to impart a set of precise instructions for alleviating the discomfort. However, Moe and Larry's misinterpretation of Claude's guidance leads to a series of missteps in their attempts to resolve Shemp's dental predicament. Eventually, after a tumultuous endeavor, they successfully extract the troublesome tooth.

Subsequently, Claude proposes a camping trip as a means of recuperation for Shemp. In a display of camaraderie, Claude offers to sell the Stooges a car to facilitate their excursion, yet the vehicle proves fraught with mechanical deficiencies.

The trio encounters a sequence of tribulations in their endeavor to mobilize the faulty automobile, culminating in Moe sustaining an injury when a flat tire ensnares his foot beneath the vehicle. Despite the challenges encountered during their journey, Shemp experiences a notable improvement in his condition, signaling the efficacy of the excursion as a therapeutic intervention.

== Production notes ==
Wham-Bam-Slam! is a reworking of 1948's Pardon My Clutch, using ample recycled footage from the original. The new scenes (including Shemp's toe squashed by a lobster, leading to a cossack dance) were filmed on January 18, 1955. Both films borrow plot elements from the Laurel and Hardy shorts Perfect Day (1929) and Them Thar Hills (1934).

== Quotes ==
- Larry: "You know, fish is great brain food."
- Moe: "You know, you should fish for a whale!" *SLAP!*

== See also ==
- List of American films of 1955
