= Perfect Day (1929 film) =

1929 film

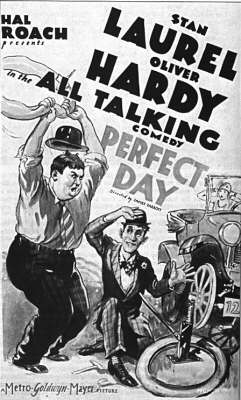
- Directed by: James Parrott
- Written by: Leo McCarey (story); Hal Roach (story); H.M. Walker
- Produced by: Hal Roach
- Starring: Stan Laurel; Oliver Hardy; Edgar Kennedy; Kay Deslys; Isabelle Keith
- Cinematography: Art Lloyd; George Stevens
- Edited by: Richard C. Currier
- Music by: William Axt; S. Williams; Leroy Shield (1937 reissue)
- Distributed by: Metro-Goldwyn-Mayer
- Release date: August 10, 1929
- Running time: 19:40
- Country: United States
- Language: English

Perfect Day is a 1929 short comedy film starring Laurel and Hardy.

== Plot ==
Perfect Day (1929)

Two familial units embark on a Sunday outing, utilizing a Ford Model T as their mode of transportation. However, their journey is fraught with challenges stemming from the unreliable nature of the vehicle. Laurel, Hardy, their respective spouses, and the cantankerous Uncle Edgar encounter a series of mishaps necessitating repeated exits and reentries into the automobile, punctuated by the refrain "goodbye."

Tensions escalate when a dispute with a neighbor escalates into a potential conflict involving thrown projectiles, prompting the intervention of the local clergyman to defuse the situation. Despite these setbacks, the families persist in their excursion, only to encounter further adversity in the form of an unexpectedly deep pothole, derailing their plans yet again.

== Cast ==
- Stan Laurel as Stanley
- Oliver Hardy as Ollie
- Edgar Kennedy as Uncle Edgar
- Kay Deslys as Mrs. Hardy
- Isabelle Keith as Mrs. Laurel
- Baldwin Cooke as irate neighbor
- Lyle Tayo as irate neighbor's wife
- Harry Bernard as neighbor across the street
- Clara Guiol as wife of neighbor across the street
- Charley Rogers as Minister

== Production notes ==
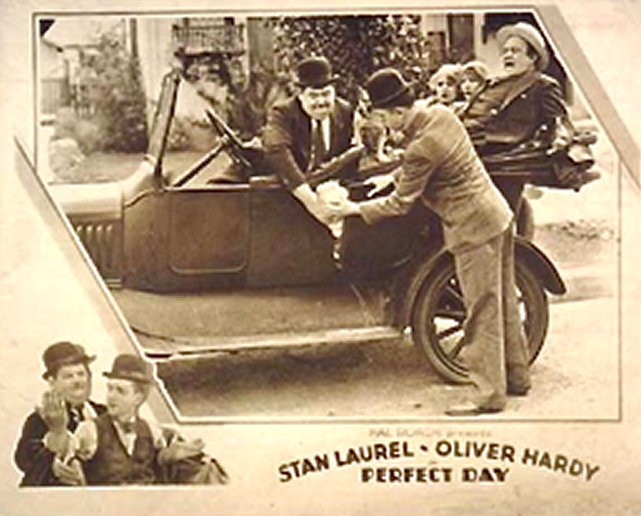
Theatrical lobby card for Perfect Day

Perfect Day was written in May 1929 and filmed between June 1–8, 1929. The original 1929 release of Perfect Day contained no music other than that used over the opening credits. The Roach Studios would reissue the film in 1937 with an added music score being utilized at the time in other Roach comedies. The 1929 version was considered lost until the 2011 DVD release Laurel and Hardy: The Essential Collection, when the original Vitaphone disc track sans the incidental music became available.

Adding the soundtrack in 1937 to the existing film resulted in a slight reduction of the correct frame ratio: several scenes feature a slightly cropped picture at the top and left hand sides to allow for inclusion of the soundtrack strip.

The UCLA Film and Television Archive screened a newly restored version of the film at the 2019 UCLA Festival of Preservation. The archive "continues its mission to save the Hal Roach films of Laurel and Hardy," Head of Preservation Scott MacQueen wrote. "No body of classic comedy has been as badly abused as the Laurel and Hardy negatives, mercilessly pushed through laboratory meat grinders for decades to extract every showprint to garner every last nickel from a relentless audience. Restoring these films includes not only finding the pictorially and physically best surviving copies, but authentic content such as day-and-date title sequences lost when reissue distributors appended their own credit cards." For Perfect Day, "the original soundtrack (replaced in the mid-1930s with new music mixes) had to be recovered. Digital technology now permits us to achieve repairs once thought impossible" so that this film "looks and sounds as it did nearly 90 years ago."

The script for Perfect Day originally concluded with the family partaking in their picnic, but this was discarded when the extended gags centering on the troublesome Model T provided enough comic material to sustain the entire film.

Perfect Day was also filmed outdoors, which freed it from the stagebound claustrophobia common to many early talkies. The opening scene is the only one set indoors (the sound of whirring cameras can be heard in some shots), while the exterior sound recording was technically impressive during an era of filmmaking when most actors had to stand close to the overhead microphone. The live outdoor recording also revealed the improvisatory nature of most early Laurel and Hardy. A seated Edgar Kennedy manages to ad lib "Oh, shit!", which escaped the scrutiny of movie and television censors.

Despite the fact that the film industry was still adjusting to the making talking pictures, Laurel and Hardy mastered the new technology early on; the overall excellence and high reputation of Perfect Day bears testimony to the team's fruitful use of the new medium. Using sound effects to punctuate a visual gag — a technique The Three Stooges would build their entire film career around — was still in its infancy in 1929. The loud, ringing CLANG heard when Stan is beaned on the head with the Model T's clutch would be termed by a 1929 film reviewer as "the funniest effect so far heard in a comedy." The second half of the Stooges' 1948 film Pardon My Clutch and its remake, Wham Bam Slam, is a remake of Perfect Day.

== 1937 reissue soundtrack ==
- "Ku-Ku" (Marvin Hatley)
- "We're Just a Happy Family" (Leroy Shield)
- "Let's Face It" (Shield)
- "We're Out for Fun" (Shield)
- "Carefree" (Shield)
- "Up in Room 14" (Shield)
- "The Laurel and Hardy Waltz" (Nathaniel Shilkret)
- "Up in Room 14" (reprise) (Shield)
- "Colonial Gayeties" (Shield)
- "On a Sunny Afternoon" (Shield)
- "We're Out for Fun" (Shield)
- "Here Comes the Stagecoach" (Hatley)
- "Our Relations/Finale" (Shield)

== The Sons of the Desert ==
Chapters — called Tents — of The Sons of the Desert, the international Laurel and Hardy Appreciation Society, all take their names from L&H films. The Perfect Day Tent is in Amsterdam, The Netherlands.
