= The Red Mill (film) =

1927 film

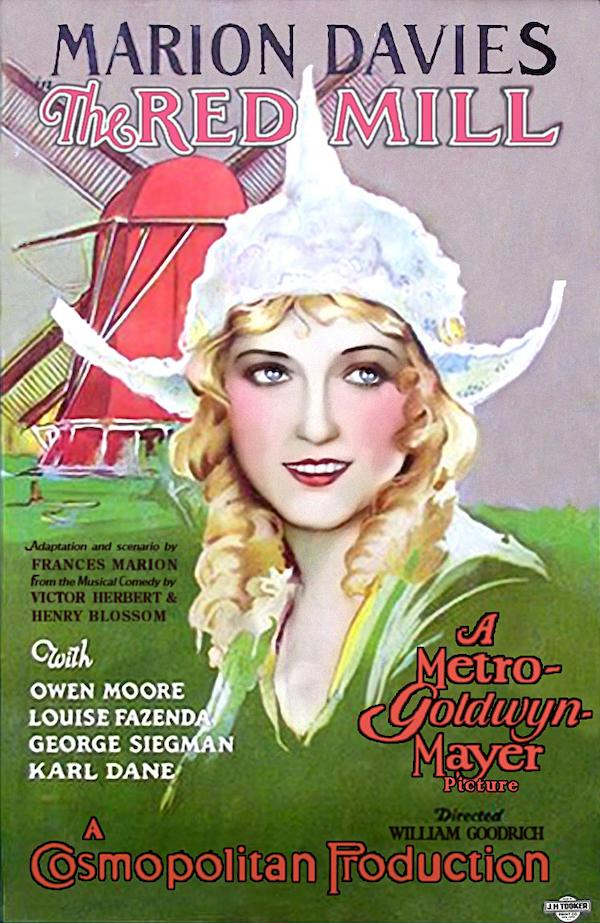
- Theatrical poster
- Directed by: William Goodrich (Roscoe Arbuckle)
- Written by: Frances Marion; Titles: Joseph Farnham
- Based on: The Red Mill; 1906 musical by Victor Herbert; Lyrics by Henry Blossom
- Produced by: King Vidor (uncredited)
- Starring: Marion Davies; Owen Moore; Louise Fazenda; George Siegmann
- Cinematography: Hendrik Sartov
- Edited by: Daniel J. Gray
- Production company: Cosmopolitan Productions
- Distributed by: Metro-Goldwyn-Mayer
- Release date: January 29, 1927
- Running time: 70 minutes
- Country: United States
- Language: Silent (English intertitles)
- Budget: $539,000

The Red Mill (1927) by Roscoe Arbuckle

The Red Mill is a 1927 American silent comedy film directed by Roscoe Arbuckle (as William Goodrich) that starred Marion Davies and was produced by King Vidor. Although Arbuckle was acquitted in the third trial for the death of Virginia Rappe, he could not obtain work in Hollywood under his own name, so he adopted the pseudonym William Goodrich for directing the comedy shorts he made under his contract with Educational Film Exchanges.

== Plot ==
Tina, the drudge of the Red Mill Tavern in Holland, works hard and long hours, with her only company being a mouse, named Ignatz. Willem is the mean Tavern proprietor who catches her feeding the mouse. He is outraged and scares away the mouse and takes it out on Tina.

Dennis Wheat, a foreigner who came to the Netherlands for the damsels, is accompanied by his valet Caesar Rinkle. One day, Tina notices Wheat and immediately falls in love with him. She sneaks out of the tavern to be closer to him and hears him saying he will judge an ice skating race. The winner of the race will be kissed by him.

Tina decides to enter the race and wins. When Dennis is about to kiss her, Willem storms out and takes Tina with him. She later finds out Dennis is leaving town and becomes sad. Tina goes back to her hard working days and fantasizes about Dennis returning. Dennis returns in the spring and takes an interest in the Burgomaster's daughter Gretchen, who is about to marry the Governor but actually is in love with Captain Jacop Van Goop.

Jacop sends Gretchen a letter, begging her to elope with him at night. Gretchen has to cross her overprotecting father if she wants to leave the house, and does not think there is any chance she will be able to leave the house. Tina, however, helps her escape successfully by dressing up like her and Gretchen dressing up like Tina. After Gretchen has left, Dennis sneaks into the house to meet the woman he noticed. He kisses Tina, thinking it is Gretchen.

Gretchen goes back home when she is scared after Tina's mouse runs into her shoe. Meanwhile, Caesar overhears someone saying Gretchen will inherit her grandfather's estate the day she marries and immediately informs Dennis. Jacop climbs on a ladder leading to Gretchen's room to reunite with her. Dennis sees this and thinks Jacop is kissing the same girl he kissed. He is mad and throws a stone to him, making him fall off his ladder through the window of the tavern.

Tina comes up, still dressed up as Gretchen, and tells Dennis Jacop was a relative and it was only a formal kiss. She promises to elope with him in the morning. The next day, Gretchen is forced to marry the governor. She begs Tina to save her, before she leaves with her father. Tina eventually scares everyone away with her mouse, and sneaks off with Gretchen. Gretchen is soon reunited with Jacop, but Tina is left being chased by both the wedding guests and the burgomaster.

Willem finds her hiding in the tavern and locks her up in a mill as punishment, which is rumored to be haunted by ghosts. Tina is scared, but Dennis comes after her and protects himself with a gun. An accident causes him to shoot Tina in the back. They kiss and are happy, but find out Willem is after them with a shotgun. Dennis and Tina escape through a window and can now finally love each other carefree.

== Cast ==
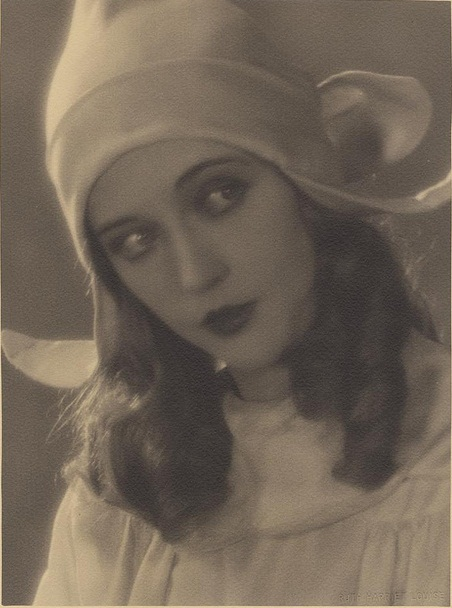
Davies photographed by Ruth Harriet Louise for the film

- Marion Davies as Tina
- Owen Moore as Dennis
- Louise Fazenda as Gretchen
- George Siegmann as Willem
- Karl Dane as Capt. Jacop Van Goop
- Russ Powell as Burgomaster (as J. Russell Powell)
- Snitz Edwards as Caesar Rinkle
- William Orlamond as Governor
- Fred Gamble as Innkeeper (as Fred Gambold)
- Ignatz as Himself
- Kay Deslys as Skater (uncredited)
- Sally Eilers as Skater (uncredited)
- Scotty Mattraw as Cook (uncredited)
- Carl 'Major' Roup as Extra (uncredited)
- Turner Savage as Boy (uncredited)

== Production ==
The film, produced by Cosmopolitan Productions, is based on the 1906 musical The Red Mill that had starred comedian Fred Stone and was based on the book and music of the same name. The show was produced by famed theatrical impresario Charles Dillingham. Henry Blossom wrote the lyrics to Victor Herbert's music. The musical was revived again in the mid-1940s.

In her 23rd film, Marion Davies played a Dutch kitchen drudge who gets involved in a case of mistaken identity. An entire Dutch village was constructed on the MGM lot, complete with windmills and canals. While Davies fondly remembered working with Louise Fazenda and Owen Moore, she had quite different memories of being repeatedly dunked in a hole in the ice. This film started the behind-the-scenes comeback of Roscoe Arbuckle. Although his on-screen credit for direction was a "William Goodrich," it was widely reported in the trade papers that he was directing the Davies film. This was the second film in which Davies ice skated. She had previously learned to skate for The Young Diana.

== Home media ==
The film aired on the cable channel Turner Classic Movies on January 3, 2008, which was the birthday of leading role actress Marion Davies. It was released on DVD directly from The Warner Archive on March 22, 2009.
