= The Secret Garden (1918 film) =

1918 silent film by Gustav von Seyffertitz

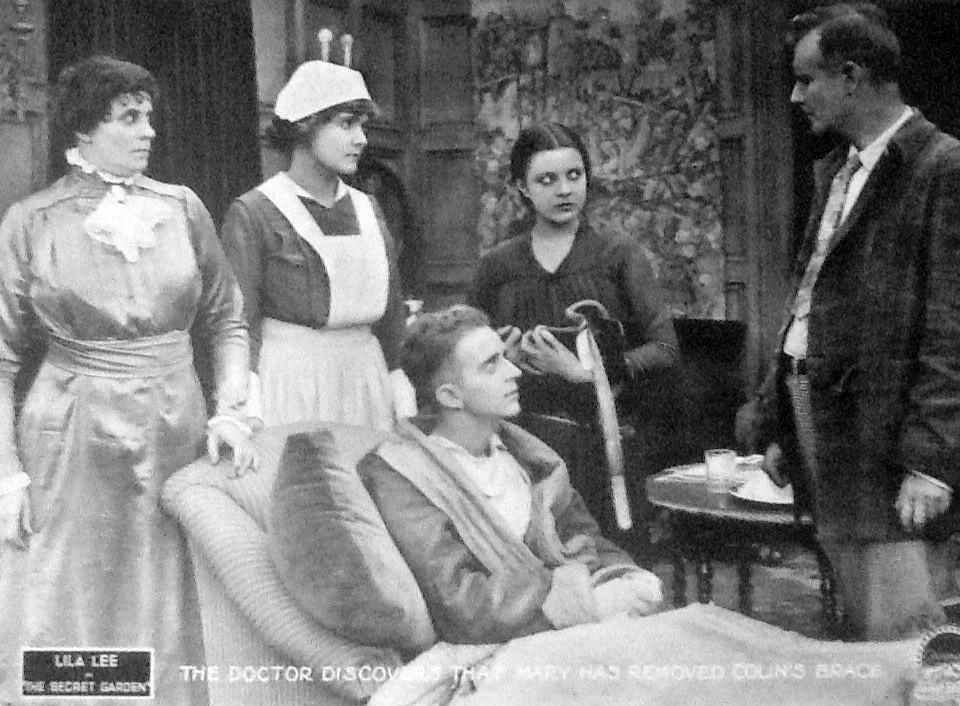
- Lobby card
- Directed by: Gustav von Seyffertitz (as G. Butler Clonebough)
- Screenplay by: Marion Fairfax
- Based on: The Secret Garden; 1911 novel by Frances Hodgson Burnett
- Produced by: Jesse L. Lasky
- Starring: Lila Lee; Spottiswoode Aitken; Clarence Geldart; Richard Rosson; Fay Holderness; Ann Malone
- Cinematography: Henry Kotani
- Production company: Famous Players–Lasky Corporation
- Distributed by: Paramount Pictures
- Release date: December 1918
- Running time: 50 minutes
- Country: United States
- Language: Silent…English titles

The Secret Garden is a lost 1918 American drama silent film directed by Gustav von Seyffertitz and written by Frances Hodgson Burnett and Marion Fairfax. The film stars Lila Lee, Spottiswoode Aitken, Clarence Geldart, Richard Rosson, Fay Holderness and Ann Malone. The film was released by Paramount Pictures on January 12, 1919, after December 1918 premieres in Oklahoma City and New York City.

== Plot ==
The story is based on Frances Hodgson Burnett's 1911 book, The Secret Garden, about an orphan who is sent to England to her uncle's house, where she finds a beautiful garden with many secrets.

== Cast ==
- Lila Lee as Mary Lennox
- Spottiswoode Aitken as Archibald Craven
- Clarence Geldart as Dr. Warren Craven
- Richard Rosson as Colin Craven
- Fay Holderness as Mrs. Medlock
- Ann Malone as Martha Sowerby
- Paul Willis as Dickon Sowerby
- Lucille Ward as Mrs. Sowerby
- Mae Wilson as Colin Craven's Nurse
- James Neill as Ben Weatherstaff
- Seymour Hastings as Surgeon Harding
- Rose Dione as Mrs. Lennox
- Larry Steers as Captain Lennox
- Forrest Seabury as Indian Servant
- Miss Gunha as Ayah
