= The Barber Shop =

1933 film

- Directed by: Arthur Ripley
- Written by: W. C. Fields
- Produced by: Mack Sennett
- Starring: W. C. Fields
- Cinematography: John W. Boyle
- Production company: Mack Sennett Productions
- Distributed by: Paramount Pictures
- Release date: July 28, 1933
- Running time: 21 minutes
- Country: United States
- Language: English

The Barber Shop is a 1933 short American pre-Code comedy film starring W.C. Fields, directed by Arthur Ripley, and produced by Mack Sennett. It was written by Fields.

== Plot ==
Cornelius O’Hare, a laid-back barber, enjoys chatting on his shop’s porch while his joke-loving son, Ronald, entertains passersby – much to Mrs. O’Hare’s annoyance. An Italian vendor tries to sell Cornelius a bass fiddle, but he already owns one, affectionately named "Lena." The vendor leaves his fiddle in the shop, unknowingly setting up a comical twist.

Inside, O’Hare attempts to impress manicurist Hortense with his unorthodox bass playing. Meanwhile, he shaves a customer and locks a heavyset man in the steam room for weight loss, warning him not to stay in too long. Distracted by Hortense, O’Hare leaves his shaving customer unattended and forgets about the man in the steam room, who emerges dramatically thinner.

Mrs. O’Hare, irritated by her husband’s antics, demands shopping money and declares she’ll get a manicure – just not from Hortense. Chaos escalates when an armed bank robber bursts in, forcing a mother and child out and demanding O’Hare alter his appearance. Nervous, O’Hare accidentally clips the robber’s ear, panics, and flees on a stolen bicycle – only to loop back to his shop as the robber steps outside.

In an unexpected turn, Ronald, playing baseball in the street, accidentally knocks out the robber with a well-placed hit, sending both the criminal and Cornelius tumbling inside. Seizing the moment, O’Hare takes credit for the capture to impress Hortense, but a policeman reveals Ronald is the real hero. Just then, Cornelius picks up Lena and hears an odd sound – his beloved bass has “given birth” to tiny violins. Disgusted, he throws out the Italian’s fiddle, ending the day on a surreal note.

== Cast ==
- W. C. Fields as Cornelius O'Hare
- Elise Cavanna as Mrs. O'Hare
- Harry Watson as Ronald O'Hare
- Dagmar Oakland as Hortense – manicurist
- Frank Alexander as steam room victim – before(uncredited)
- Billy Bletcher as steam room victim – after (uncredited)
- Joe Bordeaux as passerby (uncredited)
- Harry Bowen as cop (uncredited)
- Fay Holderness as little girl's mother (uncredited)
- William McCall as man with horse (uncredited)
- Cyril Ring as escaped bank robber (uncredited)
- Dick Rush as cop (uncredited)
- John Sinclair as Mr. Flugg – shave customer (billed as John St. Clair)

== Reception ==
The Hollywood Reporter wrote: "Here is a two-reeler which placed on a bill with a good feature, will make the customers forget there ever was a double feature program and will send them out of the theatre laughing at the well-timed gags that were written and served by W. C. Fields. The veteran comic proves to be one of the funniest and cut-throatingest barbers that ever played a bass violin. The direction was fine and the gags were good, with the exception of the last fadeout, which should have come about a half minute before it did. This slapstick comedy is a laugh-getter and will furnish a pleasing dish on any program."
