= Salvation Jane (film) =

1927 film

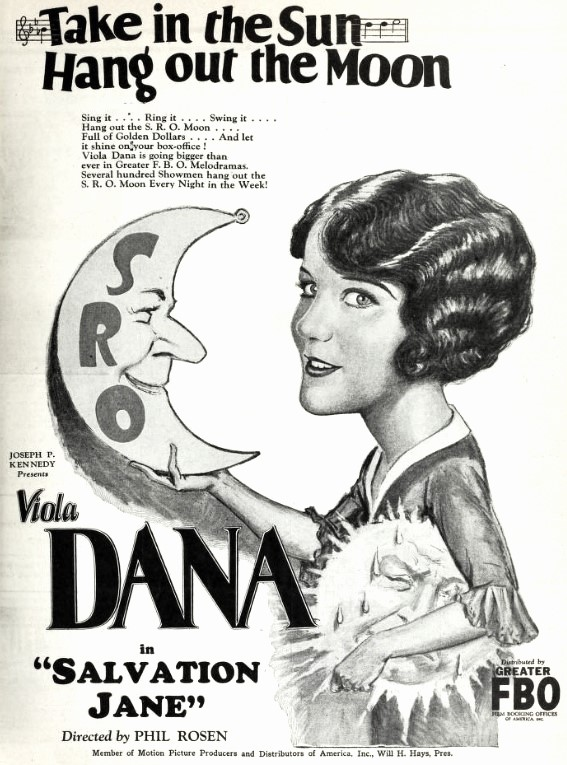
- Advertisement
- Directed by: Phil Rosen
- Screenplay by: Doris Schroeder
- Story by: Maude Fulton
- Starring: Viola Dana; J. Parks Jones; Fay Holderness; Erville Alderson
- Cinematography: H. Lyman Broening
- Production company: Robertson-Cole Pictures Corporation
- Distributed by: Film Booking Offices of America
- Release date: March 1, 1927
- Running time: 60 minutes
- Country: United States
- Language: Silent (English intertitles)

Salvation Jane is a 1927 American silent crime film directed by Phil Rosen and written by Doris Schroeder. The film stars Viola Dana, J. Parks Jones, Fay Holderness and Erville Alderson. The film was released on March 1, 1927, by Film Booking Offices of America.

== Cast ==
- Viola Dana as Salvation Jane
- J. Parks Jones as Jerry O'Day
- Fay Holderness as Captain Carrie Brown
- Erville Alderson as Gramp

== Preservation ==
With no prints of Salvation Jane located in any film archives, it is a lost film.
