= Sappy Birthday =

- Directed by: Harry Edwards
- Written by: John Grey (story and screenplay); Lloyd French (story and screenplay)
- Produced by: Del Lord; Hugh McCollum
- Cinematography: George Meehan
- Edited by: Burton Kramer
- Release date: 5 February 1942
- Running time: 17 minutes
- Country: United States
- Language: English

Sappy Birthday is a 1942 American film directed by Harry Edwards.

== Cast ==
- Andy Clyde as Andy "Hole-in-One" Clyde
- Matt McHugh as Hector – Andy's Brother-In-Law
- Olin Howland as Mr. Plantem, Cemetery Plot Salesman
- Esther Howard as Mrs. Andy "Martha" Clyde
- Vernon Dent as Neighbor Policeman
