= Isabelle Keith =

American actress (1898–1979)

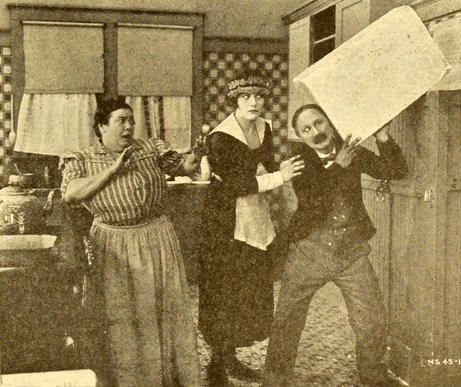
- Keith (center) with Fanny Kelly and Ben Turpin in No Mother to Guide Him (1919)
- Born: Isobel Keep; May 27, 1898; Nebraska, U.S.
- Died: July 20, 1979 (aged 81); Mill Valley, California, U.S.
- Other names: Claudelle Kaye; Isabel K. Fowler
- Occupation: Actress
- Years active: 1919–1937
- Spouse: Richard Weil

Isabelle Keith (born Isobel Keep; May 27, 1898 – July 20, 1979) was an American actress.

Keith was born Isobel Keep on May 27, 1898, in Nebraska. She initially was billed under her birth name, but she changed her professional name to Isabelle Keith after she had a bit part in The Four Horsemen of the Apocalypse (1921).

She appeared in 42 films between 1919 and 1936, most of them from the MGM studio, and on two occasions with Laurel and Hardy. She played the wife of both Laurel and Hardy, in Perfect Day and Be Big!, respectively.

Keith changed her professional name to Claudelle Kaye for some films, including Manhattan Melodrama (1934).

Keith married Richard Weil, a writer. When she died on July 20, 1979, she was living in Mill Valley, California, and was known as Isabel K. Fowler.

== Partial filmography ==
- No Mother to Guide Him (1919, Short) as The Maid - a Household Necessity (as Isabelle Keep)
- Hearts and Flowers (1919, Short) as Bathing Beauty (uncredited)
- Trying to Get Along (1919, Short) as Cabaret Girl (uncredited)
- Uncle Tom Without a Cabin (1919) as Audience Spectator (uncredited) (as Isabelle Keep)
- Up in Alf's Place (1919) as Bathing Girl (uncredited)
- A Lady's Tailor (1919, Short) as Dancer (uncredited) (as Isobel Keep)
- The Gingham Girl (1920, Short) as The City Aunt's Daughter (as Isabelle Keep)
- By Golly! (1920, Short) as Society Girl (uncredited) (as Isabelle Keep)
- Striking Models (1920, Short) (as Isabelle Keep)
- The Four Horsemen of the Apocalypse (1921) as German Woman (uncredited)
- She Sighed by the Seaside (1921, Short) as Bathing Girl (uncredited) (as Isabelle Keep)
- The Desert Flower (1925) as Inga Hulverson
- The Greater Glory (1926) as Anna Birbach, Pauli's Wife
- The Clinging Vine (1926) as House Guest (uncredited)
- You'd Be Surprised (1926) as Party Guest (uncredited)
- The Night of Love (1927) as Wedding Banquet Guest (uncredited)
- The King of Kings (1927) (uncredited)
- Very Confidential (1927) as Adelaide Melbourne
- Her Wild Oat (1927) as Hotel Guest (uncredited)
- Riley the Cop (1928) as French Woman on Pier (uncredited)
- Anne Against the World (1929) as Teddy
- Leaping Love (1929, Short) as Betty Haley / Mother
- Perfect Day (1929, Short) as Mrs. Laurel
- Barnum Was Right (1929) as Phoebe O'Dare
- Their Own Desire (1929) as Isabelle, Polo Player / Snooty Dinner Guest (uncredited)
- Spring Is Here (1930) as Blonde Party Guest with Bess (uncredited)
- Viennese Nights (1930) as Franz's Rejected Girlfriend (uncredited)
- Be Big! (1931, Short) as Mrs. Hardy
- Mata Hari (1931) as Party Guest (uncredited)
- But the Flesh Is Weak (1932) as Party Guest (uncredited)
- Rasputin and the Empress (1932) as Party Girl (uncredited)
- The Barbarian (1933) as Train Passenger (uncredited)
- Broadway to Hollywood (1933) as Jenny Carter, Girl in Movie Clip (uncredited)
- Dancing Lady (1933) as Miss Allen, secretary (uncredited)
- The Women in His Life (1933) as Nurse (uncredited)
- Air Fright (1933, Short) as Passenger (uncredited)
- You Can't Buy Everything (1934) as Nurse at clinic (uncredited)
- Men in White (1934) as Nurse (uncredited)
- Manhattan Melodrama (1934) as Miss Adams, Jim's secretary (as Claudelle Kaye)
- Stamboul Quest (1934) as 2nd Nun (uncredited)
- Evelyn Prentice (1934) as Prentice's secretary, Miss Meade (uncredited)
- The Gay Bride (1934) as MacPherson's Secretary (uncredited)
- Society Doctor (1935) as Nurse (uncredited)
- The Unwelcome Stranger (1935) as Mrs. Forbes (uncredited)
- Reckless (1935) as Woman in Audience Who Throws Purse (uncredited)
- The Flame Within (1935) as Nurse Carter (as Claudelle Kaye)
- Calm Yourself (1935) as Mrs. Gloria Lansell (as Claudelle Kaye)
- Woman Wanted (1935) as Telephone Operator (uncredited)
- Anna Karenina (1935) as Wife - First Couple (uncredited)
- It's in the Air (1935) as Guest at money auction (uncredited)
- Doughnuts and Society (1936) as Miss Bradley (as Claudelle Kaye)
- How to Behave (1936, Short) as Alfred's Wife, Party Hostess (uncredited)
- Speed (1936) as Nurse (uncredited)
- Between Two Women (1937) as Nurse (uncredited) (final film role)

== Trivia ==
Keith, as Claudelle Kaye, played William Powell's secretary in Manhattan Melodrama, the picture John Dillinger watched in Chicago's Biograph Theater just before walking out into the FBI's fatal ambuscade in July 1934.
