= Shootin' Injuns =

1925 film

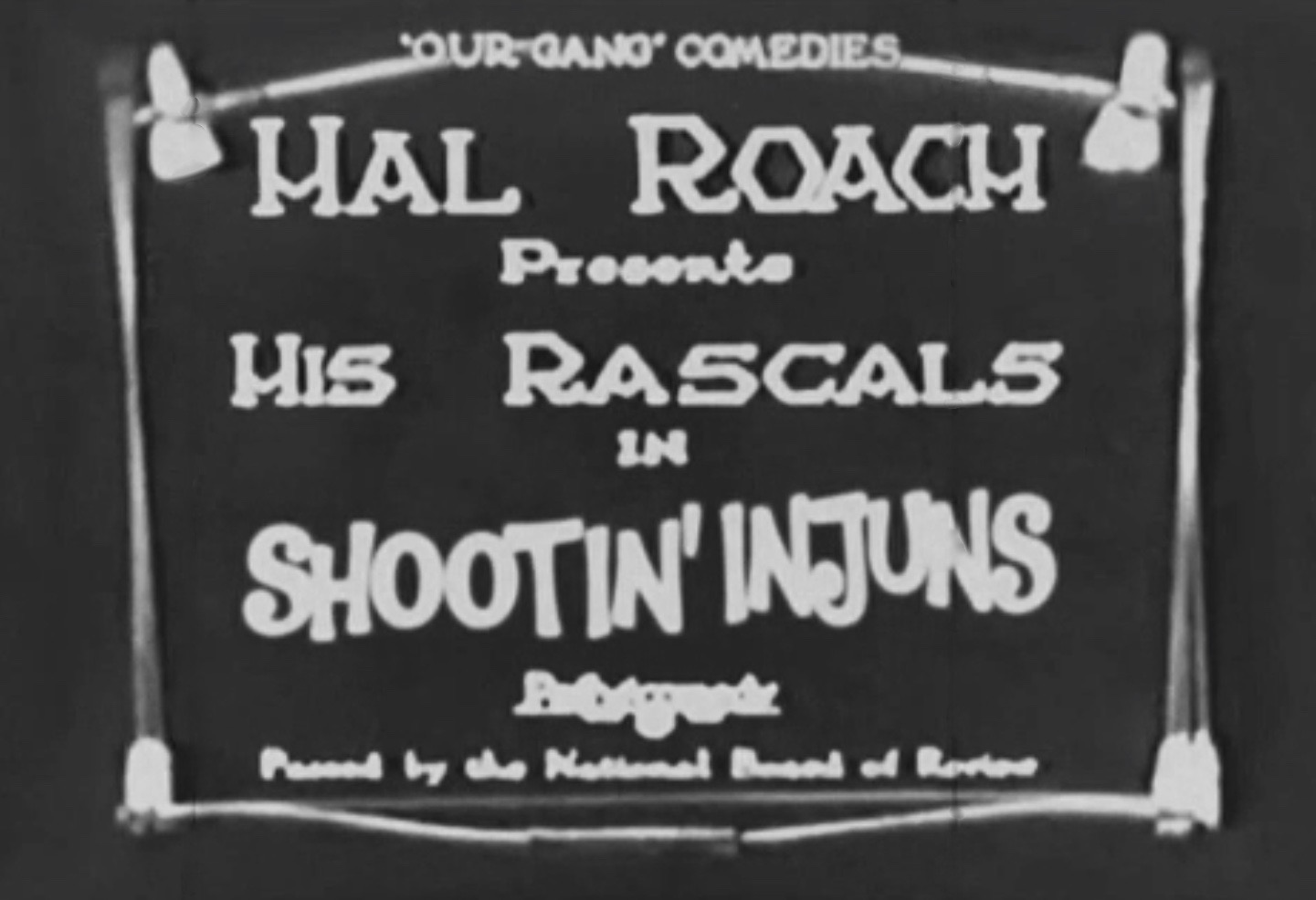
- Directed by: Robert F. McGowan
- Written by: Hal Roach; H. M. Walker
- Produced by: Hal Roach
- Starring: Joe Cobb; Jackie Condon; Mickey Daniels; Johnny Downs; Allen Hoskins; Eugene Jackson; Mary Kornman; Pal the Dog; Richard Daniels; Jack Gavin; William Gillespie "Tonnage" Martin Wolfkeil
- Cinematography: Alvin Knechtel
- Edited by: Richard Currier
- Distributed by: Pathé Exchange
- Release date: May 3, 1925
- Running time: 19:10
- Country: United States
- Language: Silent with English intertitles

Shootin' Injuns is a 1925 American short silent comedy film, the 38th in the Our Gang series, directed by Robert F. McGowan.

== Plot ==
The gang ventures away to shoot Indians, despite their parents' warnings. At night, they seek refuge in a nearby house, unaware that the home is actually an inventor's model for a gimmick-laden magnetic house that will be sold to an amusement park. The terrifying contrivances frighten the gang and they attempt to flee. Their parents arrive to remedy the situation and are involved with the gimmickry as well.

== Cast ==
=== The Gang ===
- Mickey Daniels – Mickey, alias General Custer
- Jackie Condon – Jackie, alias Daniel Boone
- Joe Cobb – Joe, alias Sheriff "Buckshot" Joe
- Johnny Downs – Johnny, alias Davy Crockett
- Allen Hoskins – Farina, alias Pancho Farino
- Mary Kornman – Mary
- Eugene Jackson – Pineapple
- Pal the Dog – Himself

=== Additional cast ===
- Richard Daniels – W. R. Jones, inventor
- Jack Gavin – father
- William Gillespie – father
- "Tonnage" Martin Wolfkeil – Joe's father
