= Erville Alderson =

American actor (1882–1957)

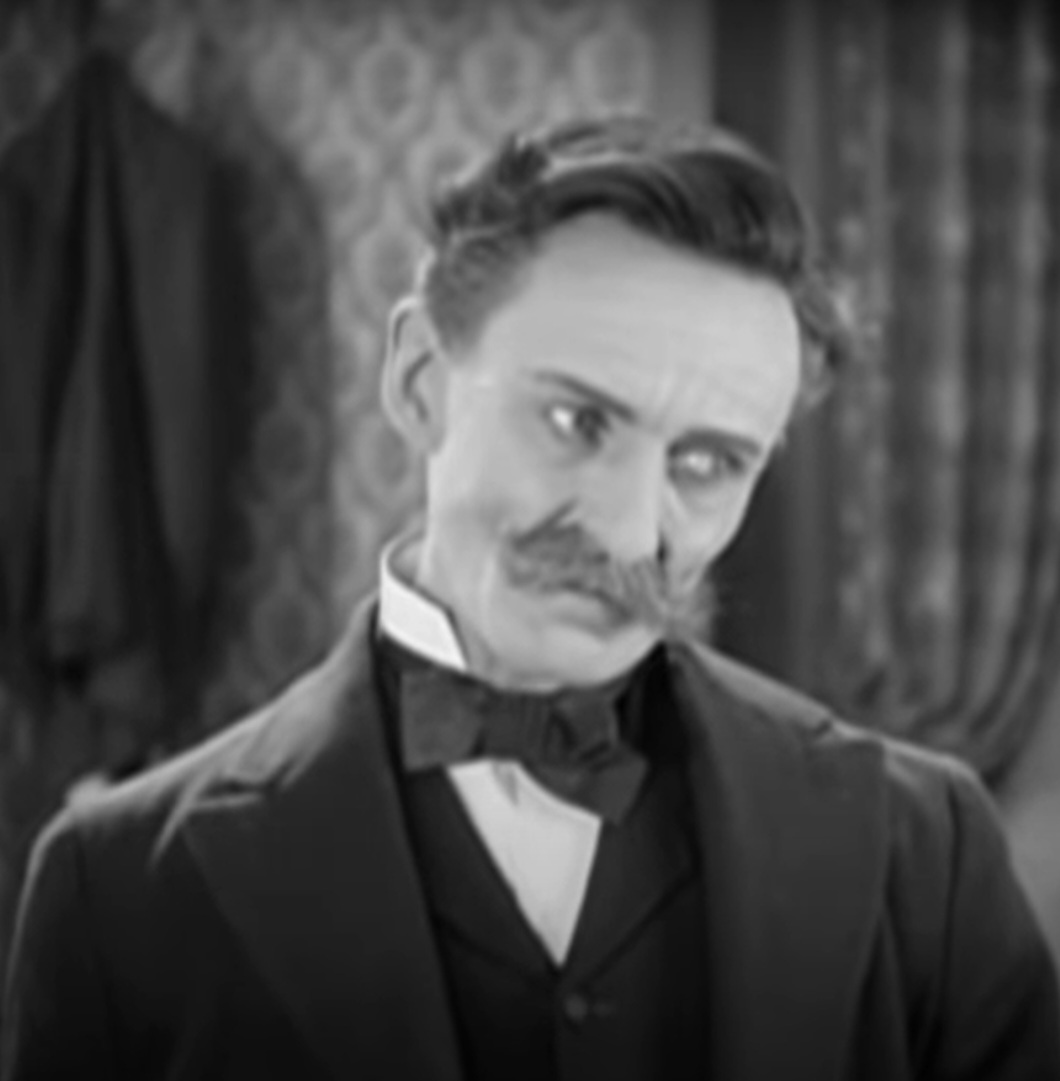
- Alderson in Sally of the Sawdust (1925)
- Born: September 11, 1882; Kansas City, Missouri, U.S.
- Died: August 4, 1957 (aged 74); Glendale, California, U.S.
- Resting place: Hollywood Forever Cemetery
- Occupation: Actor
- Years active: 1918–1957
- Spouse: Lillian Worth (m. 1918; div. 1925)

Erville Alderson (September 11, 1882 – August 4, 1957) was an American character actor, usually portraying strong-willed or wise men, appearing in nearly 200 films between 1918 and 1957.

== Life ==
Alderson was born in Kansas City, Missouri. He married Lillian Worth, an American actress, on January 14, 1918 in Sydney, Cape Breton Island, Nova Scotia. By 1925, the couple were divorced. Alderson's work in films included portraying Secretary of War Jefferson Davis in Santa Fe Trail (1940). Alderson died in Glendale, California. He is buried in lot 299, section 12 of the Hollywood Forever Cemetery near Los Angeles.

== Selected filmography ==
- Her Man (1918) as 'Old Milt' McBrian
- The Good-Bad Wife (1920) as Col. Denbigh
- The White Rose (1923) as Man of the World
- The Exciters (1923) as Chloroform Charlie
- America (1924) as Justice Montague
- Isn't Life Wonderful (1924) as The Professor
- Sally of the Sawdust (1925) as Judge Henry L. Foster
- Lightnin' (1925) as Courtroom Attendant (uncredited)
- The White Black Sheep (1926) as Yasuf
- The Fortune Hunter (1927) as Blinky Lockwood
- Salvation Jane (1927) as Gramp
- The Price of Honor (1927) as Ogden Bennett
- The Heart of Maryland (1927) as Maj. Gen. Kendrick
- The Girl from Chicago (1927) as Colonel Carlton
- The Valley of the Giants (1927) as Councilman
- A Thief in the Dark (1928) as Armstrong
- Fazil (1928) as Iman Idris
- Fleetwing (1928) as Trad Ben Sabam
- Speakeasy (1929) as City Editor
- Acquitted (1929) as Prison Warden (uncredited)
- Guilty? (1930)
- The Lash (1930)
- The Dawn Trail (1930)
- Shanghaied Love (1931)
- They Call It Sin (1932)
- Haunted Gold (1932)
- The Thirteenth Guest (1932)
- The Fighting Code (1933)
- Lazy River (1934)
- Square Shooter (1935)
- Hearts in Bondage (1936)
- Lincoln in the White House (1939)
- The Mighty Treve (1937)
- Jesse James (1939)
- Santa Fe Trail (1940) as Jefferson Davis
- The Grapes of Wrath (1940) as Arkansas Storekeeper (uncredited)
- Abe Lincoln in Illinois (1940) as Stonewall Jackson (uncredited)
- Parachute Battalion (1941)
- Sergeant York (1941) as Nate Tomkins
- Man from Frisco (1944)
- An American Romance (1944) as Olson
- Objective, Burma! (1945)
- The Bishop's Wife (1947) as Stevens (Mrs. Hamilton's butler)
- Again Pioneers (1950)
