= Esther Howard =

American actress (1892–1965)

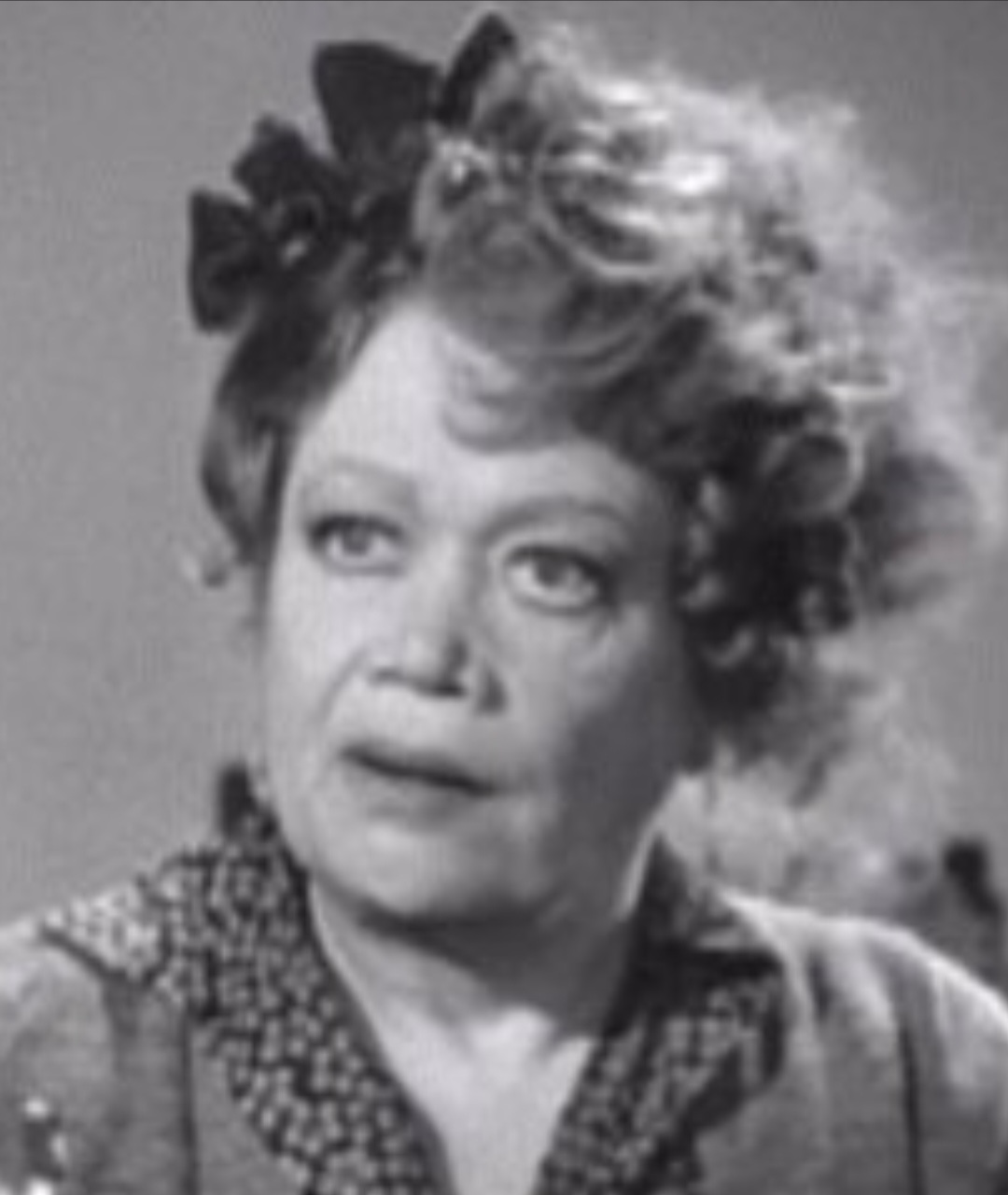
- Howard in Dick Tracy vs. Cueball (1946)
- Born: April 4, 1892; Butte, Montana, U.S.
- Died: March 8, 1965 (aged 72); Los Angeles, California, U.S.
- Resting place: Forest Lawn Memorial Park, Glendale, California
- Occupation: Actress
- Years active: 1917–1952
- Spouse: Arthur Albertson

Esther Howard (April 4, 1892 – March 8, 1965) was an American stage and film character actress who played a wide range of supporting roles, from man-hungry spinsters to amoral criminals, appearing in 108 films in her 23-year screen career.

== Early life ==
Howard was born in Butte, Montana on April 4, 1892 to Martha Esther Howard (née Boggs) and James Howard Jr., a music teacher who was employed as the conductor of the Butte Opera House. Her paternal grandfather, James Howard Sr., was a prominent physician from California who had established a medical practice in Butte and Dillon, Montana, and at one time served as the coroner of Silver Bow County. When Howard was five years old, her family relocated to Boston, Massachusetts, where her father had lived prior to relocating to Montana. In Boston, Howard attended the Girls' Latin School.

== Career ==
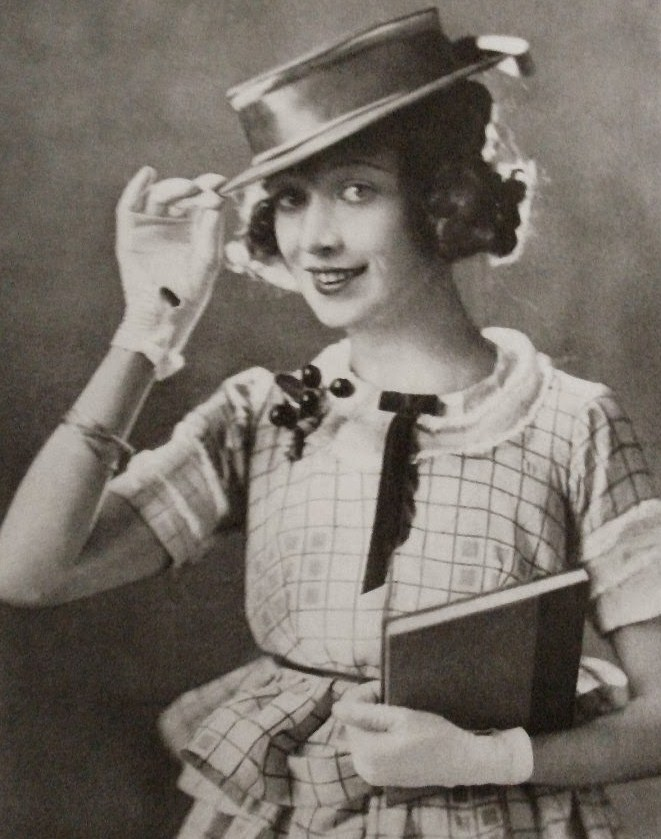
Howard in the Broadway musical The Sweetheart Shop (1920)

Howard began her stage career performing in stock theater in Lynn, Massachusetts, before making her Broadway debut in 1917 in a play called Eve's Daughter, which was not a success. Over the next twelve years she performed on Broadway in eleven more comedies and musicals, including the hit shows Wildflower (1923) and The New Moon (1929), which was her final Broadway production.

In 1930, Miss Howard was still slender and beautiful when she changed her focus to making movies, appearing in a Vitaphone comedy short, The Victim (1930). From that point until her retirement in 1952, she worked regularly – at least one film she appeared in was released every year. She was often cast as an oversexed dowager, a decrepit old hag, and occasionally, a glamorous society dame. Known for her versatility and expressive face, notable among her many roles were the gorgeous Miss Prescott in Meet the Mayor (1932), frowsy Jessie Florian in Raymond Chandler's Murder My Sweet (1944), an aunt who has a crush on Oliver Hardy in Laurel and Hardy's The Big Noise (1944), diner waitress Holly in Detour (1945), bawdy Filthy Flora in Dick Tracy vs. Cueball (1946), the determined Mrs. Kraft out to solve a murder in Born to Kill (1947), and as Kirk Douglas' mother in Champion (1949). Miss Howard's lovely singing voice was used to ghost sing (dub in) for bigger-name stars who had no singing talent, but she never sang onscreen for herself.

From 1940 to 1949, Howard was part of Preston Sturges' unofficial "stock company" of character actors, appearing in seven films written and directed by Sturges. From 1937, Howard was a regular player in short-subjects produced at Columbia Pictures, where she was frequently cast opposite comedian Andy Clyde. Her last film was a Columbia comedy short, Caught on the Bounce (1952), in which she played Joe Besser's aunt.

== Death ==
Howard died of a heart attack in Los Angeles, California, on March 8, 1965, aged 72. She is buried in Forest Lawn Memorial Park in Glendale, California.

== Selected filmography ==
- The Vice Squad (1931) – Josie
- Wicked (1931) – Minor Role (uncredited)
- The Yellow Ticket (1931) – Prisoner (uncredited)
- Ladies of the Big House (1931) – Clara Newman
- A Fool's Advice (1932) – Mrs. Prescott
- The Cohens and Kellys in Hollywood (1932) – Mrs. Maggie Kelly
- Merrily We Go to Hell (1932) – Vi
- Winner Take All (1932) – Ann – Joan's Friend
- Life Begins (1932) – Mrs. Tubby's Friend (uncredited)
- Rackety Rax (1932) – 'Sister' Carrie
- Second Hand Wife (1933) – Mrs. Trumbull (uncredited)
- The Iron Master (1933) – Mrs. Stillman
- Grand Slam (1933) – Mary (uncredited)
- Sweepings (1933) – Violet's Madame (uncredited)
- Below the Sea (1933) – Lily
- Cockeyed Cavaliers (1934) – Robert's Serving Girl (uncredited)
- Transatlantic Merry-Go-Round (1934) – Passenger Needing 'Hooking' (uncredited)
- Ready for Love (1934) – Aunt Ida
- The Best Man Wins (1935) – Mamie (uncredited)
- Death Flies East (1935) – Mitzi (uncredited)
- Straight from the Heart (1935) – Tired Mother (uncredited)
- The Farmer Takes a Wife (1935) – Klore's New Cook (uncredited)
- Stars over Broadway (1935) – Mary Sporesgate (uncredited)
- Klondike Annie (1936) – Fanny Radler
- Florida Special (1936) – Flirtatious Dowager (uncredited)
- M'Liss (1936) – Rose
- Swing High, Swing Low (1937) – Beauty Salon Customer (uncredited)
- Rhythm in the Clouds (1937) – Mrs. Madigan
- Dead End (1937) – Neighbor with Coarse Voice (uncredited)
- Partners in Crime (1937) – Mrs. Wagon
- Stand-In (1937) – Mrs. Mack (uncredited)
- Scandal Street (1938) – Birdie Brown
- Rebecca of Sunnybrook Farm (1938) – Mother (uncredited)
- Marie Antoinette (1938) – Streetwalker (uncredited)
- The Texans (1938) – Madame (uncredited)
- Five of a Kind (1938) – Thelma – Mother in Hoax (uncredited)
- Swing, Sister, Swing (1938) – Miss Fredericks
- Broadway Serenade (1939) – Mrs. Fellows
- Missing Daughters (1939) – Mother Hawks (uncredited)
- The Gracie Allen Murder Case (1939) – Florist (uncredited)
- The Great McGinty (1940) – Madame Juliette La Jolla
- The San Francisco Docks (1940) – Jean (uncredited)
- The Lady from Cheyenne (1941) – Landlady (uncredited)
- Sullivan's Travels (1941) – Miz Zeffie
- Sappy Birthday (1942, Short) – Mrs. Andy 'Martha' Clyde
- My Favorite Blonde (1942) – Mrs. Topley
- Jackass Mail (1942) – Dancehall Girl (uncredited)
- Tales of Manhattan (1942) – Woman Bumming Cigarette from Joe (Robinson sequence) (uncredited)
- The Palm Beach Story (1942) – Wife of Wienie King
- I Married a Witch (1942) – Extra (uncredited)
- The Miracle of Morgan's Creek (1943) – Sally (uncredited)
- True to Life (1943) – Bit Role (uncredited)
- Once Upon a Time (1944) – Clerk (uncredited)
- The Great Moment (1944) – Dr. Wells' Patient (uncredited)
- Hail the Conquering Hero (1944) – Mrs. Everett J. Noble (uncredited)
- The Big Noise (1944) – Aunt Sophie (uncredited)
- San Diego, I Love You (1944) – Mother (uncredited)
- Murder, My Sweet (1944) – Jessie Florian
- The Great Flamarion (1945) – Cleo
- Detour (1945) – Diner Waitress
- Adventure (1945) – Blister (uncredited)
- A Letter for Evie (1946) – Mrs. Edgewaters
- The Hoodlum Saint (1946) – Elderly Spectator (uncredited)
- The Falcon's Alibi (1946) – Gloria Peabody
- The Virginian (1946) – Mother of Student (uncredited)
- Without Reservations (1946) – Sarah (uncredited)
- Dick Tracy vs. Cueball (1946) – Filthy Flora
- Mr. District Attorney (1947) – Bit Role (uncredited)
- Born to Kill (1947) – Mrs. Kraft
- The Trouble with Women (1947) – Mrs. Fogarty (uncredited)
- Song of the Thin Man (1947) – Sadie – Counterwoman (uncredited)
- The Velvet Touch (1948) – Pansy Dupont
- June Bride (1948) – Mrs. Mitchell (uncredited)
- Homicide (1949) – Mrs. Brucker -Landlady
- Champion (1949) – Mrs. Kelly
- The Crooked Way (1949) – Hotel Proprietess (uncredited)
- The Lady Gambles (1949) – Gross Lady
- The Beautiful Blonde from Bashful Bend (1949) – Mrs. Smidlap
- Hellfire (1949) – Birdie
- Look for the Silver Lining (1949) – Mrs. Moffitt (uncredited)
- No Man of Her Own (1950) – Boarding House Owner (uncredited)
- Caged (1950) – Grace (uncredited)
- All That I Have (1951) – Mrs. Dalton
- Rose of Cimarron (1952) – Ma Bruce (uncredited)
- Lady in the Iron Mask (1952) – Madame Duprez (uncredited)
