= Saturday Morning (1922 film) =

1922 film

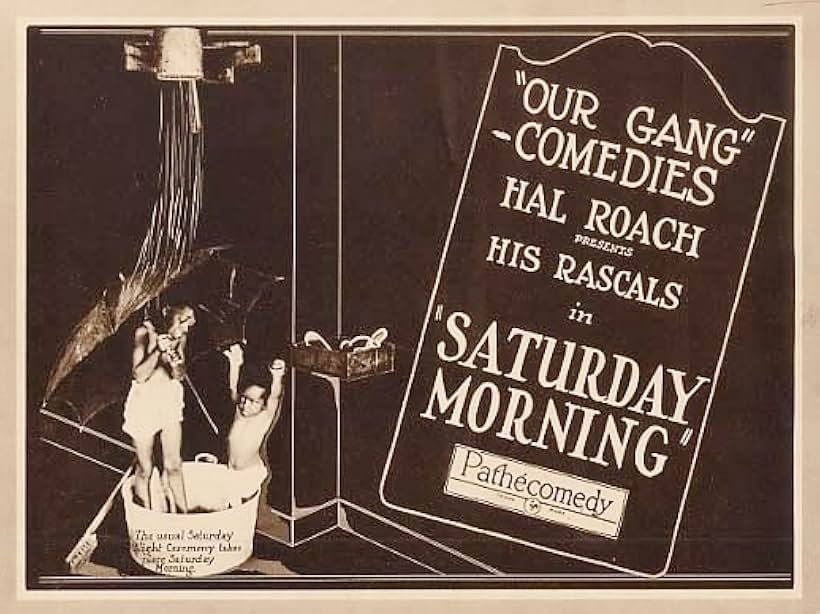
- Directed by: Tom McNamara; Robert F. McGowan
- Written by: Hal Roach; H. M. Walker
- Produced by: Charley Chase; Hal Roach
- Starring: Jackie Condon; Allen Hoskins; Mickey Daniels; Jack Davis; Mary Kornman; Ernie Morrison; Richard Daniels; Katherine Grant; William Gillespie; Ernie Morrison Sr.
- Release date: December 3, 1922
- Running time: 20 minutes
- Country: United States
- Languages: Silent film English intertitles

Saturday Morning is the fifth Our Gang short subject comedy to be released. The Our Gang series (later known as "The Little Rascals") was created by Hal Roach in 1922, and continued production until 1944.

== Synopsis ==
The various boys of the gang each manage to escape their responsibilities for the day, meeting up to build a raft for their pirate game.

== Notes ==
When the television rights for the original silent Pathé Our Gang comedies were sold to National Telepix and other distributors, several episodes were retitled. This film was released into television syndication as "Mischief Makers" in 1960 under the title Music Lesson. About two-thirds of the original film was included. Most of scenes from the first half of the film that showed the various gang members at home were cut; all of the original inter-titles were also cut. The film was also released for home viewing as "Hooray for Holidays".

== Cast ==
=== The Gang ===
- Jackie Condon as Jackie
- Mickey Daniels as Mickey
- Jack Davis as Waldemar
- Allen Hoskins as Maple
- Ernest Morrison as Sorghum
- Dinah the Mule as herself

=== Additional cast ===
- William Gillespie as Waldemar's father
- Joseph Morrison as Aunty Jackson
- Katherine Grant as The maid
- Richard Daniels as The cello teacher
