= Good Cheer =

1926 American film by Robert F. McGowan

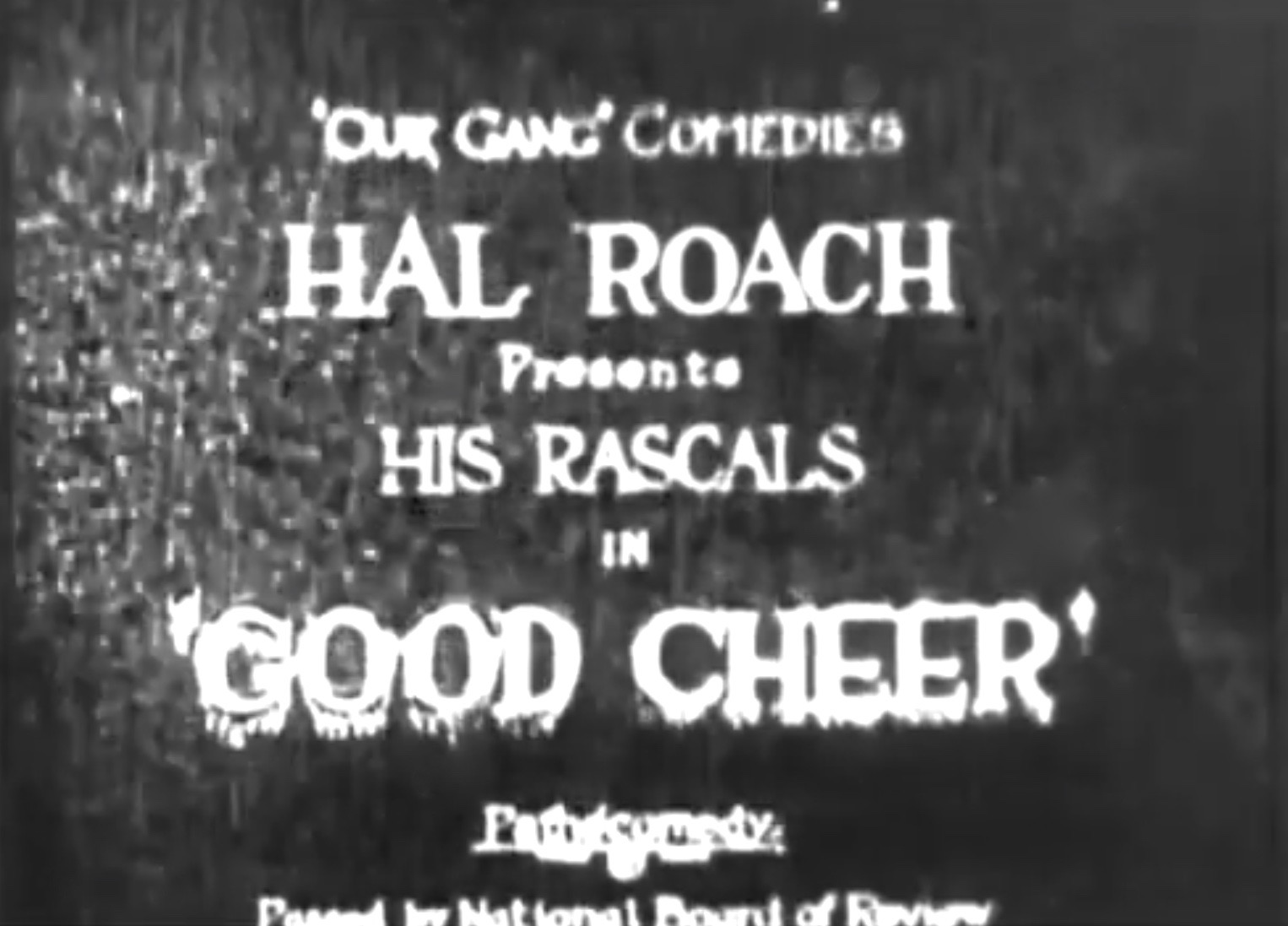
- Title card
- Directed by: Robert F. McGowan
- Written by: Hal Roach; H. M. Walker
- Produced by: Hal Roach; F. Richard Jones
- Edited by: Richard C. Currier
- Production company: Hal Roach Studios
- Distributed by: Pathé Exchange
- Release date: January 10, 1926
- Running time: 20 minutes
- Country: United States
- Language: Silent (English intertitles)

Good Cheer is a 1926 American short silent comedy film, the 46th in the Our Gang series, directed by Robert F. McGowan.

== Plot ==
The kids assemble before a large store window featuring a live Santa Claus. The curtain accidentally flies up to reveal that the Santa Claus is a fake, and the children disperse, muttering "There ain't no Santa Claus." Mickey and his pal want to restore the faith of their friends but are hampered by a lack of funds. They sell hot bricks during a snowstorm and obtain a pocketful of money. They begin a midnight trip to visit various chimneys with gifts. At the same time, criminals disguised as Santa Claus are executing a bootlegging plot. The gang assist in the capture of the crooks.

== Cast ==
=== The Gang ===
- Joe Cobb as Joe
- Jackie Condon as Jackie
- Mickey Daniels as Mickey
- Johnny Downs as Johnny
- Allen Hoskins as Farina
- Mary Kornman as Mary
- Jay R. Smith as J.R.
- Jannie Hoskins as Arnica
- David Durand as Mary's little brother
- Pal the Dog as Himself
- Dinah the Mule as Herself

=== Additional cast ===
- Jack Ackroyd as Crooked Santa
- Chet Brandenburg as Pedestrian / Crooked Santa
- Ed Brandenburg as Store window assistant
- Richard Daniels as Old man
- Jack Gavin as Crooked Santa
- Charlie Hall as Motorist / Crooked Santa
- Al Hallett as Crooked Santa
- Jack Hill - Pedestrian
- Wallace Howe as Crooked Santa
- Sam Lufkin as Inebriated Santa Claus
- Jules Mendel as Crooked Santa
- Gene Morgan as First officer
- William Orlamond as Crooked Santa
- 'Tonnage' Martin Wolfkeil as Store window Santa
- Noah Young as Second officer

== See also ==
- Our Gang filmography
