= You'd Be Surprised (film) =

1926 film by Arthur Rosson

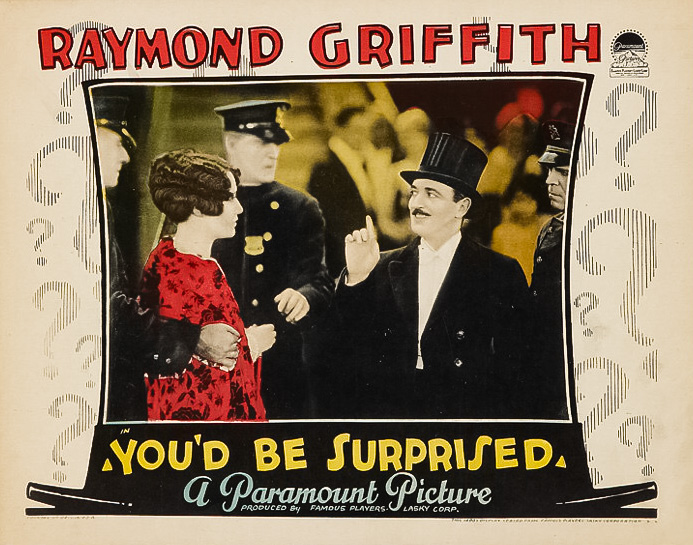
- Film poster
- Directed by: Arthur Rosson
- Written by: Jules Furthman; Robert Benchley
- Produced by: Adolph Zukor; Jesse L. Lasky; B. P. Schulberg
- Starring: Raymond Griffith; Dorothy Sebastian
- Cinematography: William Marshall
- Edited by: E. Lloyd Sheldon
- Distributed by: Paramount Pictures
- Release date: September 25, 1926
- Running time: 60 minutes
- Country: United States
- Language: Silent (English intertitles)

You'd Be Surprised is a 1926 American silent comedy mystery film directed by Arthur Rosson and starring Raymond Griffith. The production includes intertitles written by humorist Robert Benchley.

A full copy of the film is preserved in the Library of Congress.

== Cast ==
- Raymond Griffith as Mr. Green, The Coroner
- Edward Martindel as Mr. White, The District Attorney
- Earle Williams as Mr. Black, The Deputy District Attorney
- Thomas McGuire as Inspector Brown
- Dorothy Sebastian as Dorothy
- Granville Redmond as Grey, A Valet
- Roscoe Karns as A Party Guest
- Carl M. LeViness as A Party Guest
- Isabelle Keith as A Party Guest
- Dick La Reno as The "Jury" Foreman
- Monte Collins as The Milkman Juror
- Jerry Mandy as The Hot Dog Salesman "Juror"
