= Charles Deslys =

French writer

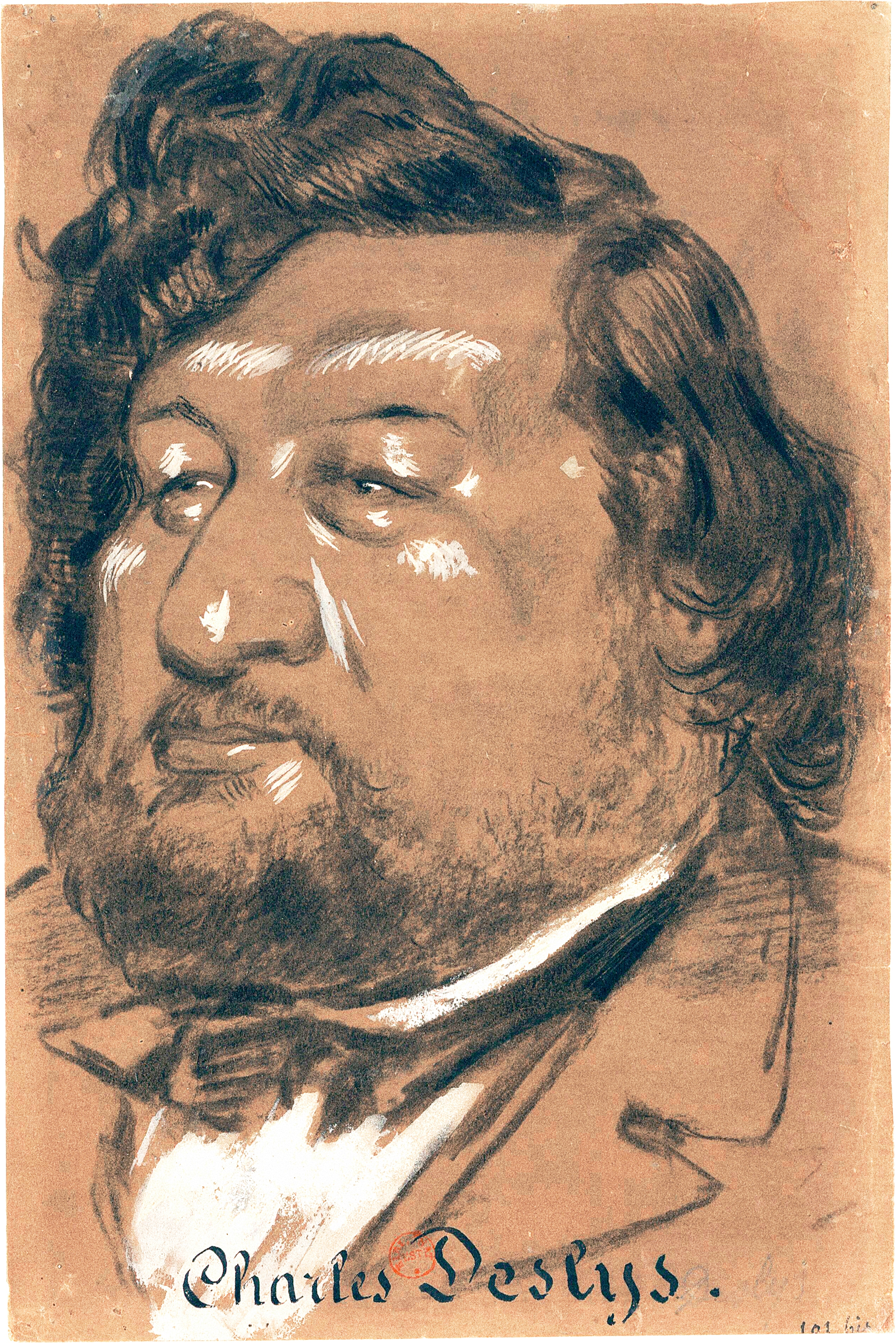
- Born: 1 March 1821; Paris, France
- Died: 13 March 1885 (aged 64); Paris, France
- Occupation: Writer

Charles Deslys (1 March 1821 – 13 March 1885) was a 19th-century French writer.

He was educated at the Lycée Charlemagne then performed a study tour in Italy. Upon his return, he became an actor in the South of France and made his debut as a writer.

He began his artistic career in the theater. He traveled the south of France as a singer or an actor. Following the publication of a trifle in 1816 (Les Bottes vernies de Cendrillon), he discovered his literary talents.

He is buried at Père Lachaise Cemetery (71st division).

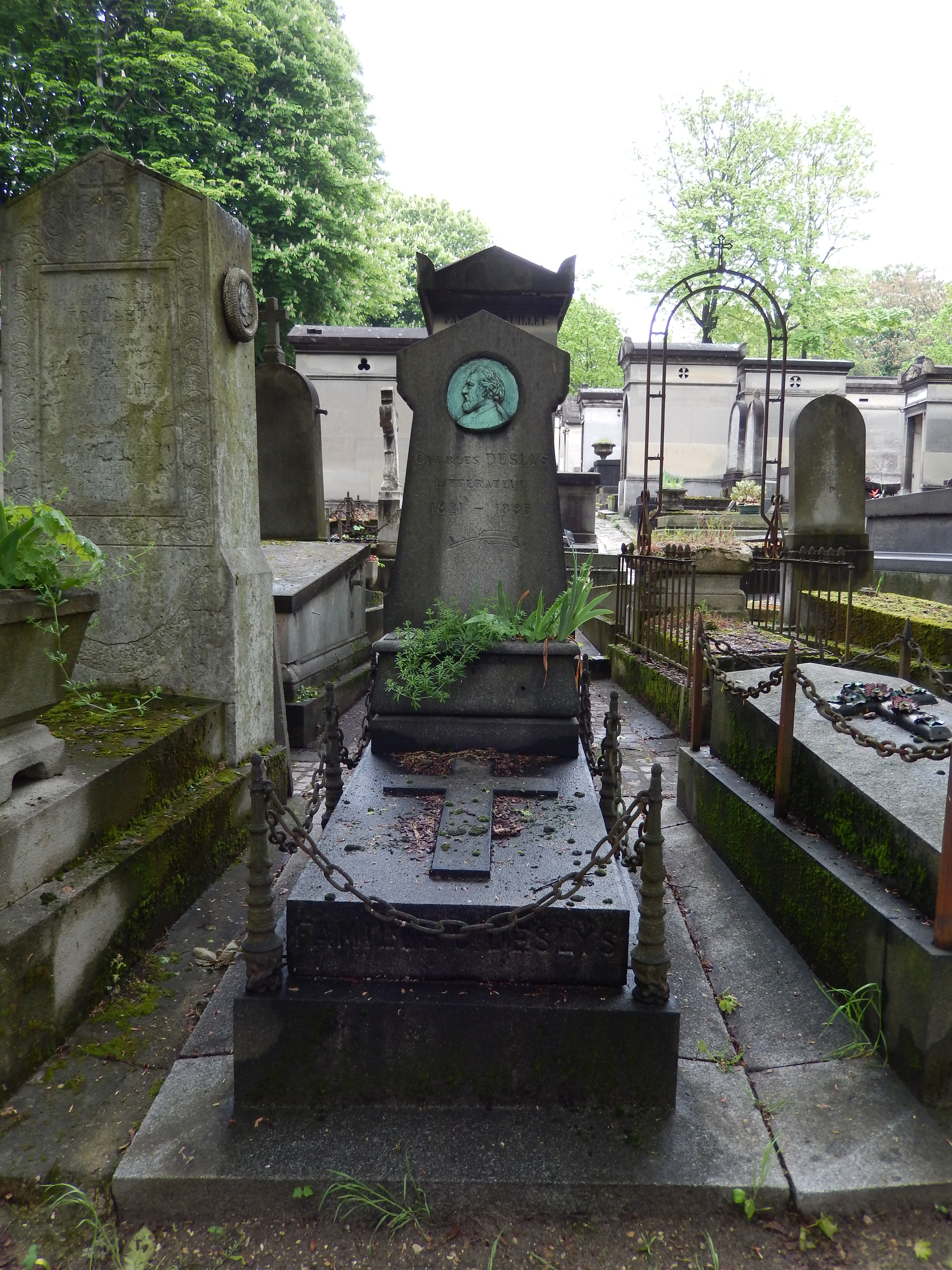
Charles Deslys's grave at the Père Lachaise Cemetery, 71st division

== Works ==
- 1847: La Mère Rainette, at Gallica
- 1849: Les Bottes vernies de Cendrillon, at Gallica
- 1850: La Marchande de plaisirs
- 1852: La Dernière Grisette
- 1852: Le Diable architecte
- 1852: Les Fiançailles des roses, opéra comique
- 1852: Flore et Zéphire, opéra comique
- 1852: Le Livre des devoirs
- 1852: Le Livre des dévotions de l'année ou l'Annuaire catholique
- 1852: Le Livre des femmes illustres
- 1852: Le Livre des fleurs
- 1852: Le Livre des saintes
- 1852: Le Livre du jardinage
- 1852: La Millionnaire ou Mademoiselle Carlier, P. Germain
- 1853: Mademoiselle Bouillabaisse, L. de Potter
- 1854: Le Jardin des plantes
- 1854: Rigobert le rapin, L. de Potter
- 1856: Heures de récréation at Gallica
- 1856: Pervenche
- 1857: Les Compagnons de minuit, Degorce-Cadot
- 1858: Le Pont rouge, drama, at Gallica
- 1862: Un appartement à louer, vaudeville
- 1864: L'Héritage de Charlemagne, Hachette
- 1866: Le Roi d'Yvetot, Dameret
- 1866: Les Récits de la grève, Didier
- 1867: Les Compères du roi, Dentu
- 1875: La Maison du bon Dieu, Sartorius
- 1875: Le Serment de Madeleine, Dentu
- 1867: Le Casseur de pierres, drama, Michel Levy
