= Pardon My Clutch =

1948 American short film by Edward Bernds

- Directed by: Edward Bernds
- Written by: Clyde Bruckman
- Produced by: Hugh McCollum
- Starring: Moe Howard; Larry Fine; Shemp Howard; Matt McHugh; Wanda Perry; George Lloyd; Stanley Blystone; Alyn Lockwood; Doria Revier; Emil Sitka
- Cinematography: Allen G. Siegler
- Edited by: Henry DeMond
- Distributed by: Columbia Pictures
- Release date: February 26, 1948 (U.S.)
- Running time: 15:30
- Country: United States
- Language: English

Pardon My Clutch is a 1948 short subject directed by Edward Bernds starring American slapstick comedy team The Three Stooges (Moe Howard, Larry Fine and Shemp Howard). It is the 105th entry in the series released by Columbia Pictures starring the comedians, who released 190 shorts for the studio between 1934 and 1959.

== Plot ==
Shemp's toothache prompts the Stooges' acquaintance, Claude, to offer medical advice, which they misinterpret. Following the extraction of Shemp's tooth, Claude proposes a camping trip for relaxation.

Lacking transportation, Claude sells them a faulty car. The trio encounters various challenges, including a flat tire and an altercation with a gas station attendant. Eventually, they attract the attention of a car collector willing to pay a premium for the vehicle. Upon learning of this, Claude hastily refunds the Stooges' money and sells the car to the collector. However, Claude's actions lead to his mistaken apprehension by men from the local asylum.

== Cast ==
=== Credited ===
- Moe Howard as Moe
- Larry Fine as Larry
- Shemp Howard as Shemp
- Matt McHugh as Claude A. Quacker

=== Uncredited ===
- Alyn Lockwood as Petunia
- Wanda Perry as Narcissus
- Doria Revier as Marigold
- George Lloyd as Service station attendant
- Emil Sitka as The Professor
- Stanley Blystone as 1st sanitarium attendant
- Alfred H. Wilson as 2nd sanitarium attendant

== Production notes ==
Pardon My Clutch was filmed on May 19–21, 1947; it would be remade in 1955 as Wham-Bam-Slam!, using ample stock footage. Both films borrow plot elements from the Laurel and Hardy shorts Perfect Day (1929) and Them Thar Hills (1934).

This is the second of three Stooge shorts with the words "pardon my" in the title. The first was Pardon My Scotch (1935).

Shemp is unable to convince the gas station attendant that the tire he is removing from the tire display actually came off his car and rolled into the gas station by accident. This was a stock routine that had been used in prior comedies. It had been performed by Joe Murphy and Bud Jamison in I'm the Sheriff (1927) and Edgar Kennedy and Charlie Hall in Slightly at Sea (1940).

A different variation of "Three Blind Mice" introductory theme is used in this entry. This version would be used again for Crime on Their Hands and The Ghost Talks.

== Quotes ==
- Larry: "You know, fish is great brain food."
- Moe: "You know, you should fish for a whale!" *SLAP!*

(As the Three Stooges head out to pack their car:)

- Shemp: "Well, fellas, let's get loaded."
- Larry: "Hey, you know I don't drink!"
