= Kay Deslys =

English comedy actress (1899–1974)

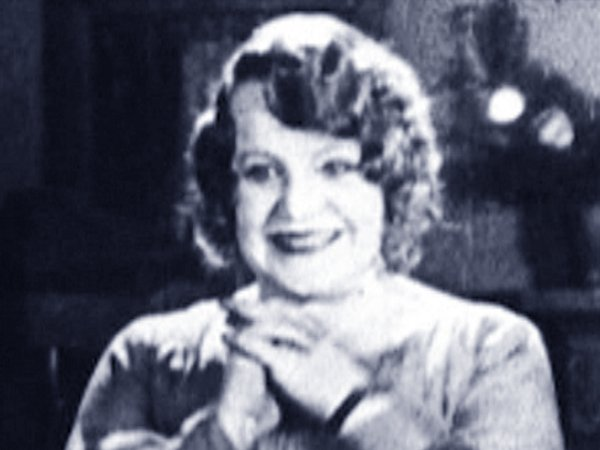

Kay Deslys (28 September 1899, in London – 15 August 1974 in West Covina, California) was an English comedy actress, based in the United States from the 1920s on.

Born as Kathleen Herbert in London, one of her earliest roles was in Charlie Chaplin's celebrated feature The Gold Rush; she later appeared in several comedies at the Hal Roach Studios, including several early Laurel and Hardy comedies.

During the 1930s and 1940s, she played mainly bit and extra roles in feature films before retiring in the early 1950s. She died of congestive heart failure and a stroke in West Covina, Los Angeles County, California, aged 74.

== Selected filmography ==
=== Laurel and Hardy Films ===
- Their Purple Moment (1928)
- Should Married Men Go Home? (1928)
- We Faw Down (1928)
- Perfect Day (1929)
- Below Zero (1930)
- Fra Diavolo (1933)

=== Other appearances ===
- Tarnish (1924)
- The Gold Rush (with Chaplin) (1925)
- Her Man o' War (1926)
- The Johnstown Flood (1926)
- The Red Mill (1927)
- Fluttering Hearts (1927)
- The Leopard Lady (1928)
- Take the Heir (1930)
- The Big Store (with The Marx Brothers) (1941)
- Never Give a Sucker an Even Break (with W.C. Fields) (1941)
- Reunion in France (1942)
