= Ed Brandenburg =

American actor and stuntman (1896–1968)

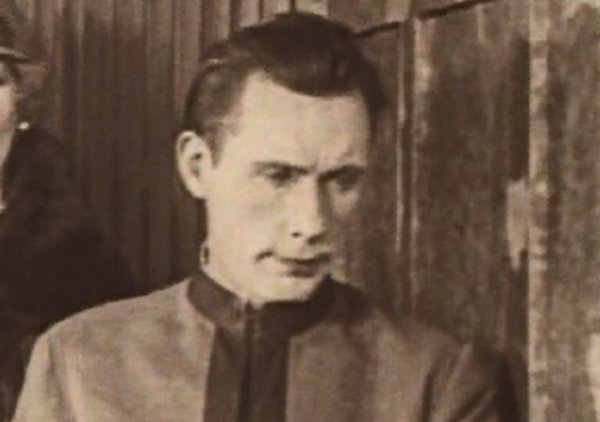
Ed Brandenburg in 1926

Marion Edgar "Ed" Brandenburg (May 5, 1896 – November 17, 1968) was an American actor and stuntman. He appeared in 37 films between 1922 and 1938 and was the brother of actor Chet Brandenburg. He was born in Lexington, Kentucky and died in San Gabriel, California.

== Selected filmography ==
- Block-Heads (1938; uncredited)
- Swiss Miss (1938; uncredited)
- Way Out West (1937; uncredited)
- Our Relations (1936; uncredited)
- Thicker than Water (1935)
- Railroadin' (1929)
- Little Mother (1929)
- Election Day (1929)
- Crazy House (1928)
- Playin' Hookey (1928)
- The Battle of the Century (1927)
- Baby Clothes (1926)
- Monkey Business (1926)
- Good Cheer (1926)
- One Wild Ride (1925)
- Young Sherlocks (1922)
- One Terrible Day (1922)
