= Election Day (1929 film) =

1929 film

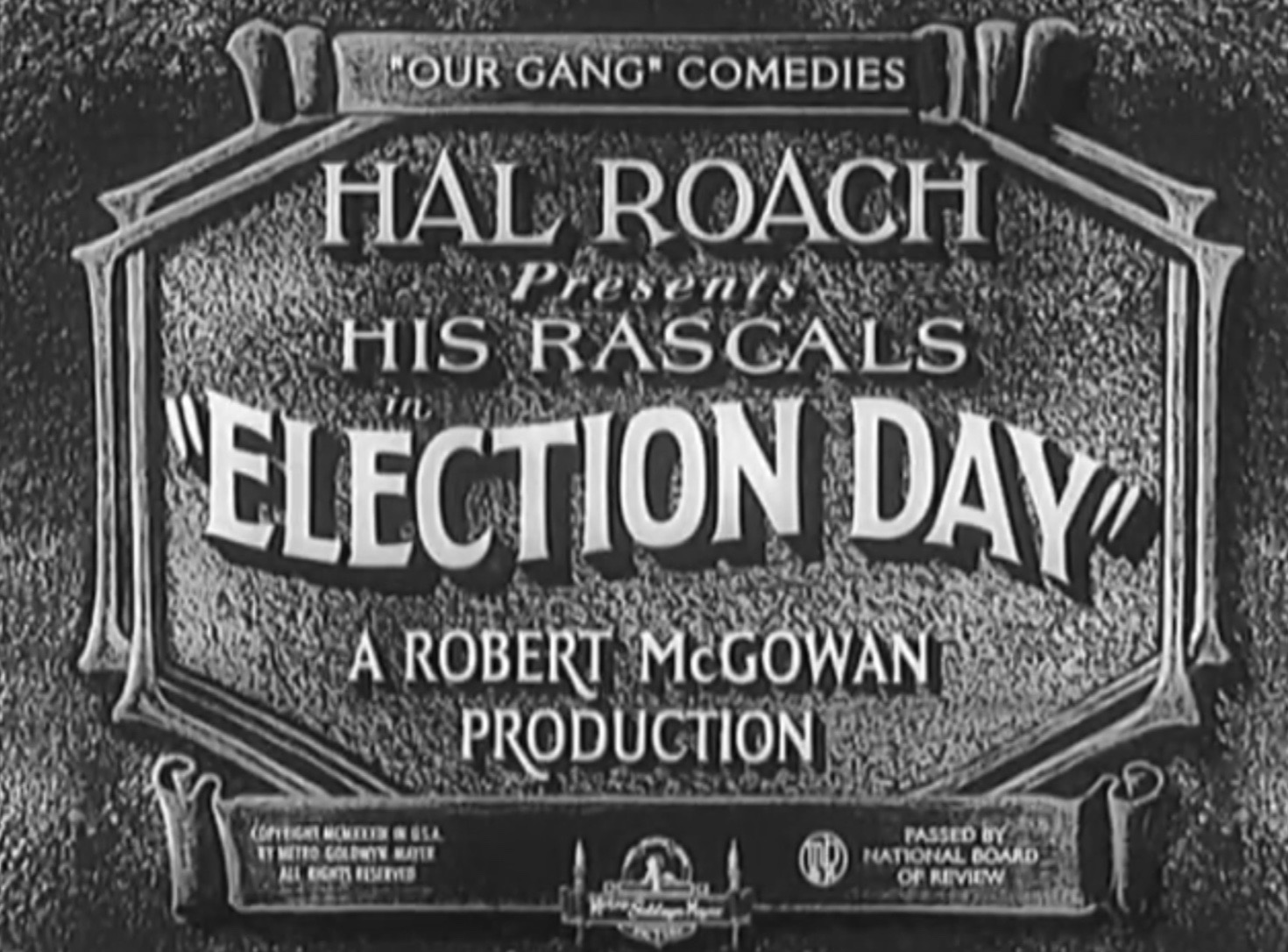
- Title card
- Directed by: Anthony Mack
- Written by: Anthony Mack; H. M. Walker
- Produced by: Robert F. McGowan; Hal Roach
- Starring: Joe Cobb; Jackie Condon; Allen Hoskins; Mary Ann Jackson; Bobby Hutchins; Jay R. Smith; Harry Spear; Pete the Pup
- Cinematography: Art Lloyd
- Edited by: Richard C. Currier
- Distributed by: Metro-Goldwyn-Mayer
- Release date: January 12, 1929
- Running time: 20:02
- Country: United States
- Languages: Silent; English intertitles

Election Day is a 1929 Our Gang short silent comedy film, the 81st in the series, directed by Anthony Mack.

== Cast ==
The film

=== The Gang ===
- Joe Cobb as Joe Cobb
- Jackie Condon as Jackie
- Allen Hoskins as Farina
- Bobby Hutchins as Wheezer
- Mary Ann Jackson as Mary Ann
- Jay R. Smith as Jay R.
- Harry Spear as Harry
- Paralee Coleman as Pleurisy
- Pete the Pup as himself

=== Additional cast ===
- Louise Beavers as Farina's mother
- Ed Brandenburg as man who slips on banana/Gangster
- Baldwin Cooke as Gangster
- Dick Gilbert as Gangster
- Jack Hill as Gangster
- Ham Kinsey as man about town
- Gene Morgan as Officer
- Clarence Muse as Farina's father
- Retta Palmer as Lady in town

== See also ==
- Our Gang filmography
