= Richard Daniels =

American actor

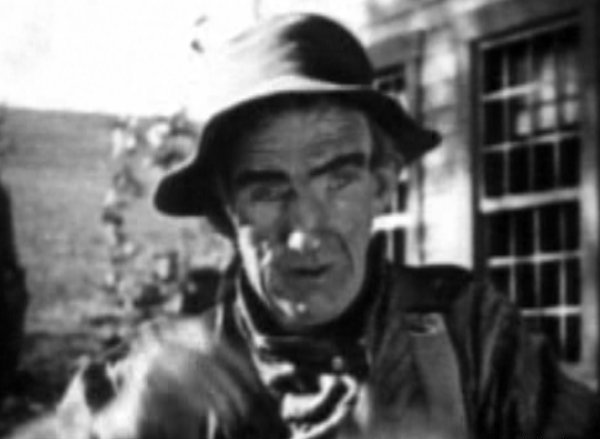
- Daniels in a still from the film The White Sheep
- Born: 23 January 1864; Gwubach, Wales
- Died: 27 January 1939 (aged 75); Los Angeles, California, U.S.
- Occupation: Actor
- Children: Mickey Daniels

Richard Daniels Sr. (23 January 1864 – 27 January 1939), was a Welsh-born American film actor. He appeared in 27 films between 1922 and 1926.

He was born in Gwubach, Wales and died in Los Angeles, California four days after his 75th birthday. He was the father of the Our Gang child actor Mickey Daniels.

== Selected filmography ==
- Saturday Morning (1922)
- Her Night of Nights (1922)
- Back Stage (1923)
- Boys to Board (1923)
- The Cobbler (1923)
- A Pleasant Journey (1923)
- The White Sheep (1924)
- Girl Shy (1924)
- Shootin' Injuns (1925)
- Good Cheer (1926)
