= Stingaree (disambiguation) =

The Stingaree was a disreputable neighborhood of San Diego at the turn of the 20th century. The word may also refer to:

Entertainment:

- Stingaree (1934 film), starring Irene Dunne and Richard Dix
- Stingaree (serial), a 1915 film serial
- "The Stingaree", a song from the musical The Girl Who Came to Supper
- Stingaree (novel) (1905), a novel by E. W. Hornung on which the films were based

Places:

- Stingaree or Stingray Bay, original name given to Botany Bay by Captain James Cook
- Stingaree Island and Stingaree Bight, in Swan Bay, Australia
- Stingaree Island (see List of islands of Maryland)

Other:

- Members of the ray family Urolophidae, or stingrays in general
- Stingaree, one of five Queensland Maritime Defence Force Auxiliary Gunboats
- XF1 SC-1 Stingaree, an aircraft made by Curtiss-Wright

== See also ==
- Captain Stingaree, a DC Comics villain
