= Going Bye-Bye! =

1934 American short film by Charley Rogers

Going Bye Bye!
- Directed by: Charley Rogers
- Produced by: Hal Roach
- Starring: Stan Laurel; Oliver Hardy; Mae Busch; Walter Long
- Cinematography: Francis Corby
- Edited by: Bert Jordan
- Music by: Marvin Hatley
- Distributed by: Metro-Goldwyn-Mayer
- Release date: June 23, 1934
- Running time: 20' 53"
- Country: United States
- Language: English

Going Bye Bye is a 1934 American pre-Code comedy short film starring Laurel and Hardy.

== Plot ==
Amidst a bustling courtroom scene, Judge Harry Dunkinson extends gratitude to spectators Stan and Ollie for their pivotal testimony, instrumental in securing the conviction of notorious criminal Butch Long. Subsequently, Butch receives a life sentence, prompting Stan's innocently impertinent inquiry regarding the absence of capital punishment.("Aren't you gonna hang him?") Incensed and restrained in a straitjacket, Butch directs menacing threats towards the duo, vowing retribution upon their persons.

Outside the courtroom, Stan and Ollie, perturbed by Butch's wrath, contemplate relocation and solicit a travel companion through a newspaper advertisement. Unexpectedly, Butch's girlfriend Mary responds to their appeal. Meanwhile, Butch, having eluded police custody, seeks refuge at Mary's abode. Stan and Ollie, oblivious to Butch's presence, visit Mary's apartment to meet their prospective fellow traveler. Mistaking the arrival of Stan and Ollie for law enforcement, Butch conceals himself in a trunk, inadvertently locking himself inside.

Unaware of Butch's identity, Stan and Ollie futilely attempt to liberate the trapped individual, resorting to misguided methods such as drilling holes into the trunk. Recognizing Ollie through one of the bored apertures, Butch instructs the duo to employ a blowtorch, resulting in a calamitous conflagration. Subsequently, Stan and Ollie resort to using a firehose to extinguish the flames, inadvertently flooding the trunk and facilitating Butch's emergence. Butch exacts vengeance upon Stan and Ollie before law enforcement intervenes, apprehending the felon. Butch then gets his revenge by breaking Stan and Ollie's legs and tying their broken legs to their neck as the Police drags Butch back to jail. The film ends with the Stan and Ollie sitting in a couch with legs wrapped around their neck. Oliver says to Stan, "Well, Here's another nice mess you've gotten. me into!" And Stan whines in response.

== Cast ==
- Stan Laurel as Mr. Laurel
- Oliver Hardy as Mr. Hardy
- Walter Long as Butch
- Mae Busch as Mary, Butch's Girlfriend
- Harry Dunkinson as Judge
- Sam Lufkin as Man with Warning

== Production notes ==
- The film is a reworking of a very early Laurel and Hardy silent comedy, Do Detectives Think? and would itself be somewhat reworked eleven years later in their final American film, The Bullfighters.
- The characters of Butch and his girlfriend are similar to their original film Any Old Port.
