= Paradise for Two =

Paradise for Two may refer to:

- Paradise for Two (1937 film), a British musical comedy film
- Paradise for Two (1927 film), an American silent romantic comedy film
