= Marin Sais =

American actress (1890–1971)

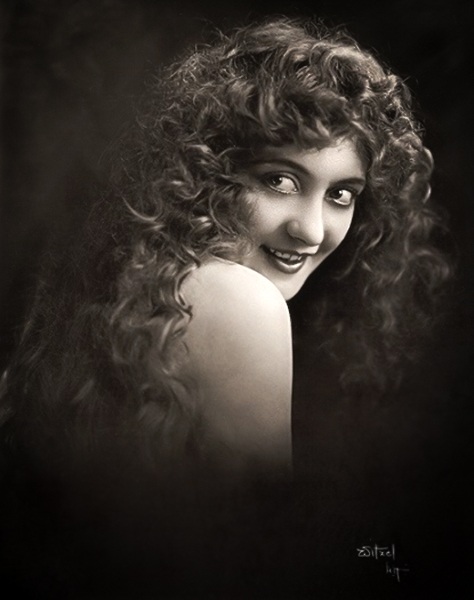
- Publicity photo, c. 1917
- Born: Mae Smith; August 2, 1890; San Rafael, California, U.S.
- Died: December 31, 1971 (aged 81); Woodland Hills, California, U.S.
- Occupation: Actress
- Years active: 1910–1953
- Spouse: Jack Hoxie (m. 1920; div. 1925)

Marin Sais (born Mae Smith; August 2, 1890 – December 31, 1971) was an American actress whose career was most prolific during the silent film era of the 1910s and 1920s. Sais' acting career spanned over four decades and she is possibly best recalled for appearing in Western themed films.

== Early life and career ==
Born in San Rafael, California into a family that was allegedly descended from one of the earliest Spanish families to settle in California, Marin Sais began her acting career as a teenager after travelling to New York City where she appeared in vaudeville.

In 1910, at the age of twenty, Sais made her screen debut for New York City's Vitagraph Studios in the short film adaptation of William Shakespeare's Twelfth Night opposite the notable actors Florence Turner and Julia Swayne Gordon. Sais would go on to star in a number of well-received comedy shorts for Kalem Company opposite actors Ruth Roland, Marshall Neilan and Edward Coxen. In 1911, Sais made her first appearance in a Western titled The Ranger's Stratagem – it would become a frequent career choice for the actress and in her later career she would rarely appear in other motion picture genres.

Throughout the 1910s, Sais' career as an actress continued to build momentum and the actress showed her versatility by appearing in such varied genres as comedy shorts, Westerns, dramas, and beginning in 1915 she began appearing in a James W. Horne directed Kalem Company Nancy Drew-style mystery serial The Girl Detective, with such titles as: The Riddle of the Rings, The Secret Code, The Disappearing Necklace and The Vanishing Vases. Sais also continued to work under the direction of Horne in dozens of Western shorts.

== Rise to stardom ==
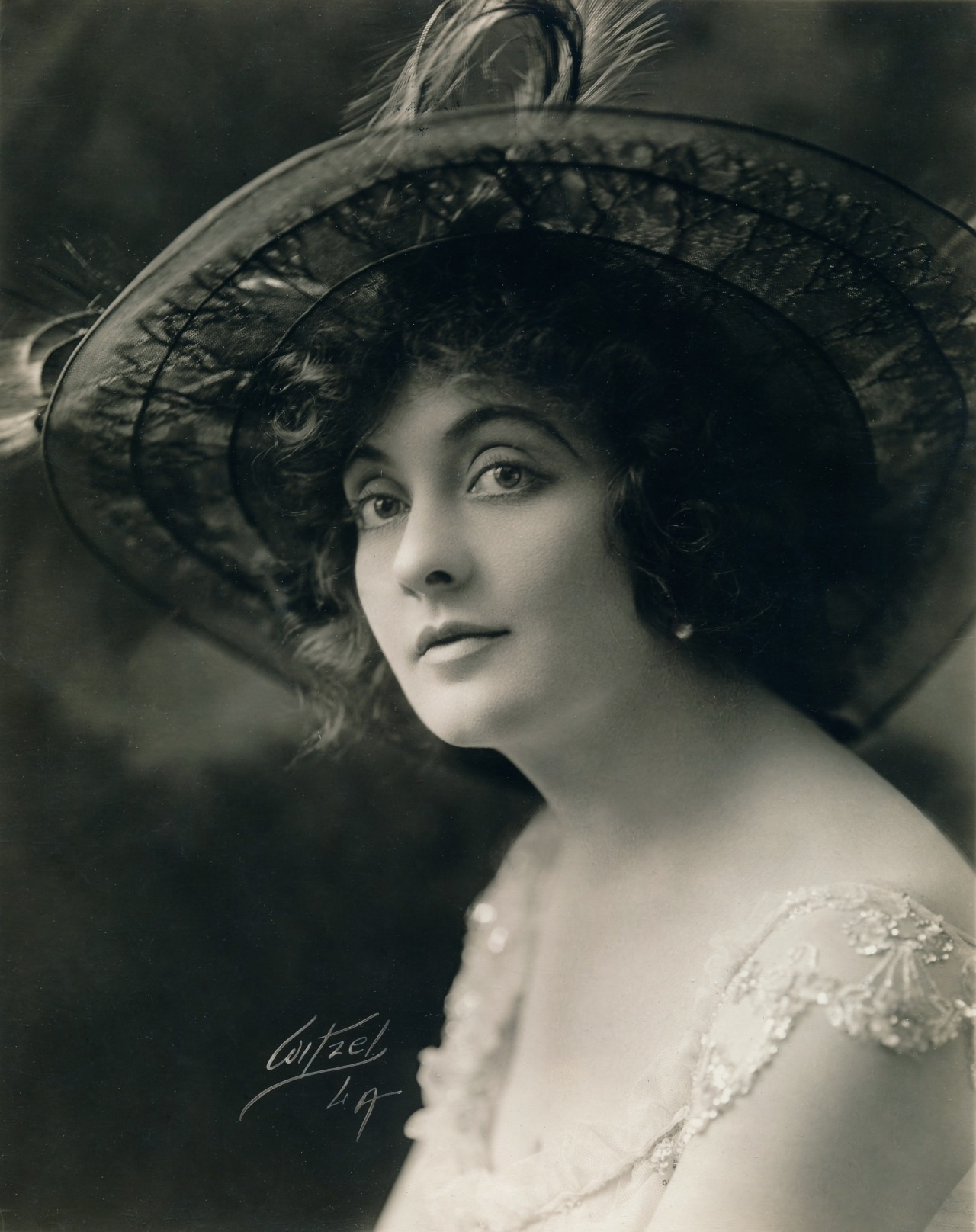
Sais, c. 1914

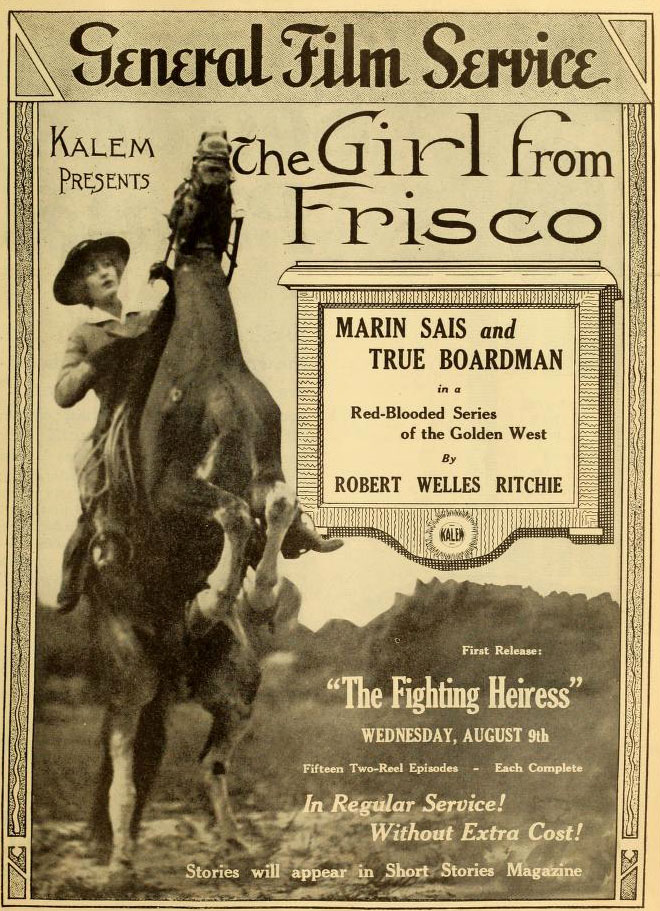
The Girl from Frisco (1916)

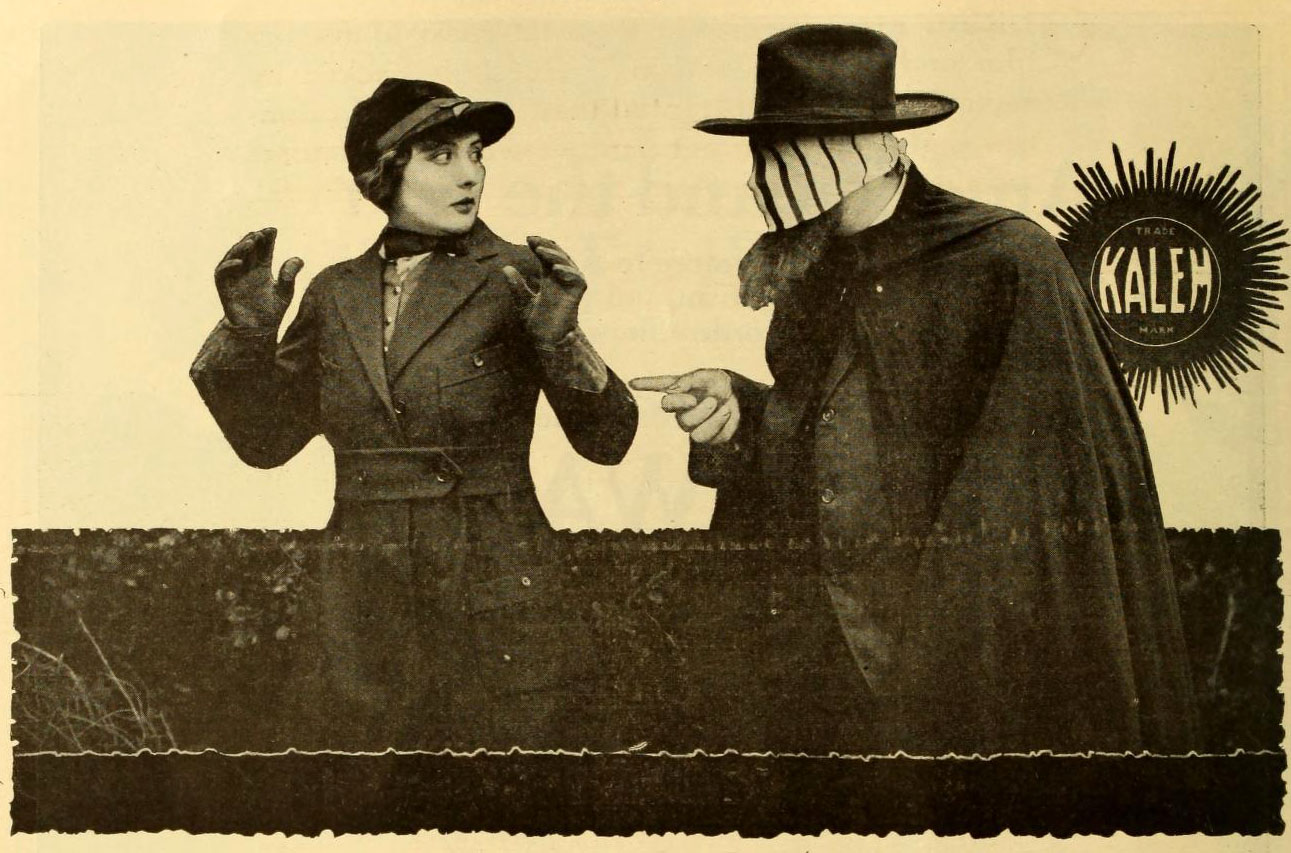
The Black Rider of Tasajara (1917)

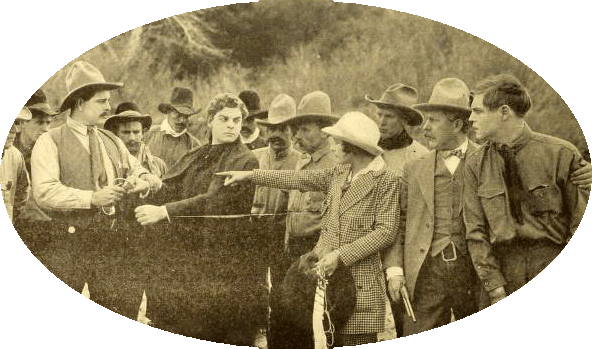
The American Girl (1917)

In December 1915, Sais was filming a lead role on location in the Mojave Desert when a sudden sandstorm blew in. She and the film crew were stranded for a day, unable to get to the nearest settlement. She suffered seriously from exposure but recuperated after a few days of rest in Los Angeles, California. In 1916 she began appearing as the character Barbara Brent in a Horne directed Western series of shorts.

By 1918 Sais was a highly popular and publicly recognizable film personality and was chosen by Japanese silent film matinee idol Sessue Hayakawa to appear opposite him in a series of film collaborations, the first being the 1918 racial drama The City of Dim Faces followed by His Birthright, released the same year and also starring Hayakawa's actress wife Tsuru Aoki. Sais' collaboration with Hayakawa ended with the 1919 film Bonds of Honor and the same year Sais appeared with Swedish actress Anna Q. Nilsson in the moderately successful drama The Vanity Pool.

In 1920, Sais married silent Western actor Jack Hoxie whom she met on the set of the 1916 film Tigers Unchained. It was her second marriage. The two began appearing in a number of well-received Western action and adventure films. Although the couple would divorce seven years later, Sais would rarely appear in films outside of the Western genre from 1920 onward. One notable film of the period was the Bruce M. Mitchell directed 1924 film The Hellion, which featured British actor Boris Karloff in one of his first prominent roles.

== Later career and death ==
By the mid-1920s Marin Sais' career was declining and she began appearing in a number of lower-budget Westerns. It was a trend that would follow Sais throughout her career into the talkie era of the 1930s and give her the dubious title of "Queen of the B-movie oaters". During the 1930s, Sais appeared in approximately twenty films - nearly all Westerns. One notable exception is an uncredited role as Mrs. Harper in 1936 cult classic Reefer Madness.

Sais' acting career continued throughout the 1940s and into the 1950s, often in bit parts or in uncredited roles in poorly received, low-budget Westerns. Two exceptions were the popular 1945 Sam Newfield-directed Western Lightning Raiders, starring Buster Crabbe and her role as The Duchess in the long-running 1949 Red Ryder serials starring Jim Bannon. By the early 1950s, she made a tentative foray into the new medium of television with a guest appearance on The Lone Ranger. Sais' last role before retirement was a small part in the made-for-TV movie The Great Jesse James Raid in 1953.

As a star in her 20s, prior to the end of World War I, Sais' home was in Glendale, California. In her later years, Marin Sais retired to the Motion Picture & Television Country House and Hospital in Woodland Hills, California, where she was a resident for many years. She died on December 31, 1971, of cerebral arteriosclerosis at the age of 81.

== Selected filmography ==
- Twelfth Night (1910)
- Walk, -- You, Walk! (1912)
- The Girl Bandits' Hoodoo (1912)
- The Boer War (1914) as Jane Lambert, their daughter
- Shannon of the Sixth (1914) as Dora Kimber
- The Potter and the Clay (1914, Short) as Rose Masters
- The Girl Detective (1915) as Bertha - The Girl Detective
- The Strangler's Cord (1915) as Frances Ballon - House Detective
- Mysteries of the Grand Hotel (1915, Serial) as Frances Ballon - House Detective [Ch. 1-7, 10] / Various Roles [Ch. 8-9, 11-12]
- The Barnstormers (1915) as Clara Worth
- The Pitfall (1915) as Margaret Laird
- Stingaree (1915, Serial) as Ethel Porter - Stingaree's Sweetheart
- The Social Pirates (1916) as Mona Hartley
- The Girl from Frisco (1916) as Barbara Brent
- The Further Adventures of Stingaree (1917) as Ethel Porter
- The Man from Tia Juana (1917) as Madge King
- The Golden Eagle Trail (1917) as Madge King
- The Ghost of the Desert (1917) as Madge King
- A Whirlwind of Whiskers (1917) as Manicurist
- The City of Dim Faces (1918) as Elizabeth Mendall
- His Birthright (1918) as Edna Kingston
- The Vanity Pool (1918) as Diana Casper
- Bonds of Honor (1919) as Olga Orczy
- The Gray Wolf's Ghost (1919)
- Thunderbolt Jack (1920) as Bess Morgan
- Dead or Alive (1921) as Sheriff Lamar's Wife
- The Broken Spur (1921) as Ida Hunt
- Hills of Hate (1921) as Carmen
- The Sheriff of Hope Eternal (1921) as Hela Marcale
- Riders of the Law (1922) as Barbara Layne
- The Forbidden Trail (1923) as Woman washing (uncredited)
- Wolf Tracks (1923) as Rose Romaine
- Good Men and Bad (1923) as Felicia
- Behind Two Guns (1924) as Mrs. Baxter
- The Hellion (1924) as The Hellion
- The Measure of a Man (1924) as Clare, his wife
- A Roaring Adventure (1925) as Katherine Dodd
- The Red Rider (1925) as Silver Waters
- The Wild Horse Stampede (1926) as Grace Connor
- Rough and Ready (1927) as Martha Bowman
- Men of Daring (1927) as Mother Owen
- The Fighting Three (1927) as Clara Jones
- The Harvester (1927)
- A Son of the Desert (1928) as Helen Dobson
- Come and Get It (1929) as Breezy's mother
- The Fighting Cowboy (1933) as Squaw Mary
- Wheels of Destiny (1934) as Settler's Wife (uncredited)
- Rawhide Romance (1934) as Mrs. Whitney
- The Man from Hell (1934) as Townswoman (uncredited)
- When Lightning Strikes (1934) as Mrs. Stevens
- Outlaw Rule (1935) as Mrs. Turk (uncredited)
- The Circle of Death (1935) as Mrs. Mary Gordon (uncredited)
- The Pace That Kills (1935) as Mrs. Bradford (uncredited)
- Reefer Madness (1936) as Mrs. Harper (uncredited)
- Drums of Destiny (1937) as Ma Green (uncredited)
- Windjammer (1937) as Bishop's Secretary (uncredited)
- Trailin' Trouble (1937) as Mrs. Johns
- Renfrew of the Royal Mounted (1937) as Mrs. MacDonald (uncredited)
- Pioneer Trail (1938) as Belle
- Phantom Gold (1938) as Mag Smith
- I Stand Accused (1938) as Minor Role (uncredited)
- Santa Fe Stampede (1938) as Townswoman (uncredited)
- Lone Star Pioneers (1939) as Kate (uncredited)
- Riders of the Frontier (1939) as Sarah Burton
- Oklahoma Terror (1939) as Mathilda - Fleeing Rancher's Wife (uncredited)
- The Mad Empress (1939) (uncredited)
- Convicted Woman (1940) as Matron (uncredited)
- Wild Horse Range (1940) as Harriet Morgan
- One Man's Law (1940) as Kathy Winters (uncredited)
- Deadwood Dick (1940, Serial) as Calamity Jane
- The Durango Kid (1940) as Mrs. Evans (uncredited)
- Two Gun Sheriff (1941) as Mrs. McKinnon
- Saddlemates (1941) as Mrs. Langley
- Billy the Kid in Santa Fe (1941) as Pat Walker
- Cracked Nuts (1941) as Woman (uncredited)
- The Iron Claw (1941, Serial) as Hannah - Silk's Housekeeper [Ch. 7] (uncredited)
- Sierra Sue (1941) as Tess (uncredited)
- Forbidden Trails (1941) as Sue - Sandy's Bride (uncredited)
- A Tragedy at Midnight (1942) as Second Mrs. Charles Miller (uncredited)
- South of Santa Fe (1942) as Townswoman (uncredited)
- Murder in Times Square (1943) (uncredited)
- Harvest Melody (1943) as Ma Nelson
- Frontier Outlaws (1944) as Ma Clark
- Enemy of Women (1944) as Frau Bendler
- Oath of Vengeance (1944) as Ma - Postmistress
- Bells of Rosarita (1945) as Duena in Wedding (uncredited)
- Along the Navajo Trail (1945) as Gypsy Woman (uncredited)
- Love, Honor and Goodbye (1945) as Wardrobe Mistress (uncredited)
- Border Badmen (1945) as Mrs. Bentley
- Girls of the Big House (1945) as Foyer Matron (uncredited)
- Lightning Raiders'' (1946) as Mrs. Loren
- King of the Forest Rangers (1946, Serial) as Mrs. Barton - Landowner [Ch. 3] (uncredited)
- Terrors on Horseback (1946) as Mrs. Jed Bartlett
- Rendezvous 24 (1946) as Rina - Heligmann's Housekeeper (uncredited)
- Stagecoach to Denver (1946) as Aunt May Barnes (uncredited)
- Yankee Fakir (1947) as Mrs. Randall (uncredited)
- Big Town After Dark (1947) as Mrs. O'Hara-Game Operator (uncredited)
- Ride, Ryder, Ride! (1949) as The Duchess (Red's Aunt)
- Roll, Thunder, Roll! (1949) as Duchess
- The Fighting Redhead (1949) as Duchess
- Cowboy and the Prizefighter (1949) as The Duchess
- The Great Jesse James Raid (1953) as Mrs. Lovett (uncredited) (final film role)
