= The Man from Tia Juana =

1917 film

- Directed by: James W. Horne
- Produced by: Kalem Company
- Starring: Marin Sais
- Distributed by: General Film Company
- Release date: July 1917
- Running time: 22 minutes
- Country: United States
- Languages: Silent; English intertitles

The Man from Tia Juana is a 1917 silent short Western film directed by James W. Horne and starring Marin Sais. It was produced by the Kalem Company and distributed through the General Film Company.

== Cast ==
- Marin Sais - Madge King
- Robert N. Bradbury - Williams from Tia Juana (* uncredited)
- Edward Clisbee - Herman Durkee (* uncredited)
- Edward Hearn - Larry Kerwin (* uncredited)
- Jack Hoxie - Sheriff (* uncredited)
- Frank Jonasson - Banker Roger King (* uncredited)

== Preservation status ==
A copy is preserved in the Library of Congress collection.
