= Edward Clisbee =

Edward Clisbee was an American actor in silent films. His roles included recurring parts in several serials. He was a police chief in one series of two-reel films. He also portrayed Hunchback Charlie. He appeared in a film series based on Bronson Howard stories.

== Filmography ==
- The Cave Man's War (1913)
- The Big Horn Massacre (1913)
- Chinese Death-Thorn
- The Boer War (1914), as General Lambert
- The Pitfall (1915)
- The Diamond Broker (1915)
- An Enemy of Mankind (1915)
- Stingaree (1915), a 12-episode serial
  - The Villain Worshipper
  - The Purification of Mulfera
  - The Moth and the Star
  - The Black Hole of Glenrenald
- The Ore Plunderers (1916)
- The Social Pirates (1916), a serial
  - The Little Mone Carlo
- The Duel in the Desert (1916)
- On the Brink of War
- The False Prophet
- The Girl from Frisco
- Witch of the Dark House (1916)
- A Whirlwind of Whiskers (1917)
- The Man from Tia Juana (1917)
- The Tyrant of Chiracahua (1917)
- The Fate of Juan Garcia (1917), as Juan Garcia
- The Lost Legion of the Border (1917)
- The Black Rider of Tasajara (1917)
- The Ghost of the Desert (1917)
- The Door in the Mountain (1917)
- The Line Rider (1917)
- The Onion Magnate's Revenge (1917)
- The Further Adventures of Stingaree (1917), a serial
  - The Tracking of Stingaree
- The Vulture of Skull Mountain
- The Skeleton Canyon Raid
- The Wolf of Los Alamos
- The Homesteaders' Feud
