= Snitz Edwards =

Hungarian actor

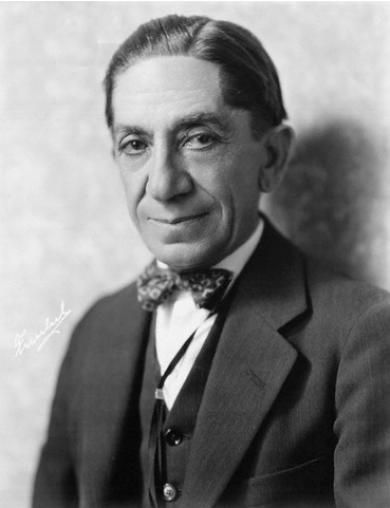
- Edwards in 1920s
- Born: Edward Neumann; January 1, 1868; Budapest, Austria-Hungary
- Died: May 1, 1937 (aged 69); Los Angeles, California, U.S.
- Occupation: Actor
- Spouse(s): Unknown (1889-??; divorced); Eleanor Taylor (1906-1937; his death)
- Children: 3

Snitz Edwards (born Edward Neumann, 1 January 1868 – 1 May 1937) was an Austro-Hungarian-born American stage and character actor of the early years of the silent film era into the 1930s. He acted alongside popular screen actors including Rudolph Valentino, Clara Kimball Young, Douglas Fairbanks, and many others.

== Early life ==
He was born Edward Neumann into a Jewish household on New Year's Day 1868 in Budapest, Hungary (then part of the Austro-Hungarian empire).

== Career ==
Edwards immigrated to the United States and became a successful Broadway stage actor during the early twentieth century. His first show was the musical comedy Little Red Riding Hood, which opened on January 8, 1900.

He often appeared in the first decade of the 20th century on Broadway in productions for such prominent stage directors as Arthur Hammerstein and Charles Frohman. He traveled with touring companies across the United States and South America. On one trip, the company manager absconded with the box office receipts, leaving Snitz and the rest of the marooned troupers to find their way across Panama to catch a steamship back to New York City. In later years, Snitz told of touring cow towns in the American West where boardinghouses had signs saying that Jews, Indians and Irish were acceptable, but not actors.

=== Move into films ===
Edwards transitioned to films rather easily and was quickly lauded as a talented character actor. With his expressive and "homely" face, he was considered by many directors to be well suited to light, comedic roles and often played characters written as a comic foil opposite starring actors. His "homely", pliable features eventually made Edwards a household name during the 1920s.

At his peak in the late 1910s and early 1920s, Edwards appeared with some of the most famous actors of the era, including Mary Pickford, Clara Kimball Young, Barbara La Marr, Douglas Fairbanks, Sr., Wallace Reid, Lila Lee, Colleen Moore, Lionel Barrymore, Conrad Nagel, Mildred Harris, Rod La Rocque, Ramón Novarro, Marion Davies, and countless others. In 1925 he was cast in one of his most memorable roles, that of Florine Papillon in the Rupert Julian directed box-office hit The Phantom of the Opera, opposite Lon Chaney, Sr. and Mary Philbin; and he co-starred with Douglas Fairbanks in Thief of Bagdad.

Edwards was also personally chosen by actor and director Buster Keaton to act in three of Keaton's films: 1925's Seven Chances, 1926's Battling Butler, and the extremely popular 1927 film College.

By the early 1930s and the advent of talkies, Edwards was already in his 60s, suffering from crippling arthritis but remaining active until his last role, a part in the 1931 William A. Wellman-directed crime drama The Public Enemy opposite actors Jean Harlow, James Cagney, and Joan Blondell. Originally, the part was a significant one, but the first scenes shot were in driving rain, causing Edwards to become severely ill. In the surviving film, he appears in only a few scenes (breezily saying "Hi ya, boys" to the juvenile Cagney and pal in the beer parlor, dropping a dime into a pay phone to rat out Cagney, refusing to open the door to Cagney after his first big job at the fur warehouse goes bad).

== Personal life and death ==
Edwards was married to actress Eleanor Taylor, and the couple had three daughters: Cricket, Evelyn and Marian. Edwards was a popular Hollywood personality, and he and Eleanor hosted lively parties and were guests of Marion Davies at San Simeon Castle.

Edwards died of natural causes on May 1, 1937, in Los Angeles, California, at the age of 69. His wife, Eleanor, continued to act as a dress extra until World War II, when she volunteered at the Hollywood Canteen. Snitz's and Eleanor's three daughters continued careers in the movie industry: Cricket was an executive for Carl Foreman and Columbia Pictures; Evelyn was a writer, story analyst, and story editor for MGM and CBS; and Marian (married to writer Irwin Shaw) produced numerous plays in Europe. Eleanor died at the Motion Picture Country Hospital in Calabasas, California, in 1968.

== Partial filmography ==
- Keep Moving (1915)
- The Price She Paid (1917)
- Going Some (1920)
- Cheated Love (1921)
- The Charm School (1921)
- No Woman Knows (1921)
- Ladies Must Live (1921)
- The Primitive Lover (1922)
- June Madness (1922)
- Love Is an Awful Thing (1922)
- Human Hearts (1922)
- The Gray Dawn (1922)
- Rags to Riches (1922)
- Rosita (1923)
- Souls for Sale (1923)
- Modern Matrimony (1923)
- Tarnish (1924)
- The Tornado (1924)
- In Fast Company (1924)
- Passion's Pathway (1924)
- The Thief of Bagdad (1924)
- Seven Chances (1925)
- Heir-Loons (1925)
- Old Shoes (1925)
- The White Desert (1925)
- The Wanderer (1925)
- A Lover's Oath (1925)
- The Phantom of the Opera (1925)
- Made for Love (1926)
- Volcano! (1926)
- Battling Butler (1926)
- The Sea Wolf (1926)
- The Cruise of the Jasper B (1926)
- Night Life (1927)
- College (1927)
- The Red Mill (1927)
- The Mysterious Island (1929)
- A Dangerous Woman (1929)
- The Right of Way (1931)
- The Public Enemy (1931)
- Sit Tight (1931)
