= Stingaree (novel) =

Book by Ernest William Hornung

- First US edition
- Author: E. W. Hornung
- Language: English
- Publisher: Chatto and Windus (UK); Charles Scribner's Sons (US)
- Publication date: 1905
- Publication place: United Kingdom

Stingaree is a 1905 novel by E. W. Hornung about an Australian bushranger. It was allegedly based on the Kelly Gang.

== Publication history ==
The book consists of ten short stories. One of these, "The Taking of Stingaree", was published in July 1901 in The Graphic. Eight of the others were published in The Strand Magazine between September 1904 and April 1905, illustrated by Australian artist George W. Lambert. These nine stories, together with a previously unpublished story titled "The Purification of Mulfera", were collected in Stingaree, which was published in September 1905. The character Stingaree first appeared in Hornung's Irralie's Bushranger, which was serialised in Cassell's Family Magazine in 1895, though this earlier version of the character was significantly different from the later version.

Hornung later wrote four other stories featuring Stingaree: "A Model Marauder", "A Fallen Angel", "The Flying Dustman", and "In Peacock Blue". "A Model Marauder" was published in Hearst's Magazine in March 1919 and Nash's Pall Mall Magazine in July 1919. "A Fallen Angel" was published in Hearst's Magazine in October 1918 and Nash's Pall Mall Magazine in April 1919. "The Flying Dustman" was published in Hearst's Magazine in December 1918 and Nash's Pall Mall Magazine in May 1919. "In Peacock Blue" was published in Nash's Pall Mall Magazine in September 1921. All four were illustrated by Gerald Leake. These stories were not published in book form until 2016 in Stingaree Rides Again.

== Adaptations ==
=== Play ===
The story was turned into a 1908 play by Hornung. This was not a success.

=== Films ===
A number of films were based on the book:

- Stingaree (1915) – serial
- The Further Adventures of Stingaree (1917) – serial
- Stingaree (1934) – film

In 1948 it was announced that Argosy Films would make a film based on the character based on a script by Cyril Hume - John Ford to direct Ben Johnson in the lead - but no film resulted. Andre de Toth visited Australia with a view to making the film but this did not happen either.
