= Joan the Woman =

1916 film

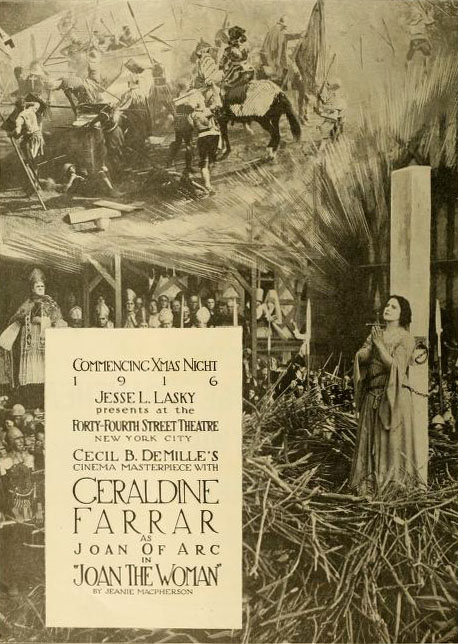
- Theatrical release poster
- Directed by: Cecil B. DeMille
- Written by: Jeanie MacPherson
- Produced by: Jesse L. Lasky; Cecil B. DeMille
- Starring: Geraldine Farrar
- Cinematography: Alvin Wyckoff
- Edited by: Cecil B. DeMille
- Music by: William Furst
- Production companies: Cardinal Film Corporation; Famous Players–Lasky Corporation
- Distributed by: Paramount Pictures
- Release date: December 25, 1916 (New York City premiere)
- Running time: 138 minutes
- Country: United States
- Language: Silent (English intertitles)
- Budget: $302,976
- Box office: $605,731

Joan the Woman is a 1916 American epic silent drama film directed by Cecil B. DeMille and starring Geraldine Farrar as Joan of Arc. The film premiered on Christmas Day in 1916. This was DeMille's first historical drama. The screenplay is based on Friedrich Schiller's 1801 play Die Jungfrau von Orleans (The Maid of Orleans). This film was considered to be the "first cinematic spectacle about Joan of Arc."

Miss Farrar ranked her performance in Joan the Woman among the great achievements of her entire career.

== Plot ==
Joan the Woman (1916)

A British officer in World War I has a dream of the life of Joan of Arc. The officer pulls a sword out of the wall of the trench he is in, the sword used to belong to Joan of Arc. Removing the sword conjures up the ghost of Joan, leading to her telling her story. The setting then changes to France where the story of Joan of Arc is told, of her leading the French troops to victory and her subsequent burning at the stake. The story ends back in the trench with the officer deciding to go on a suicide mission, using Joan's story and sword as inspiration.

== Cast ==
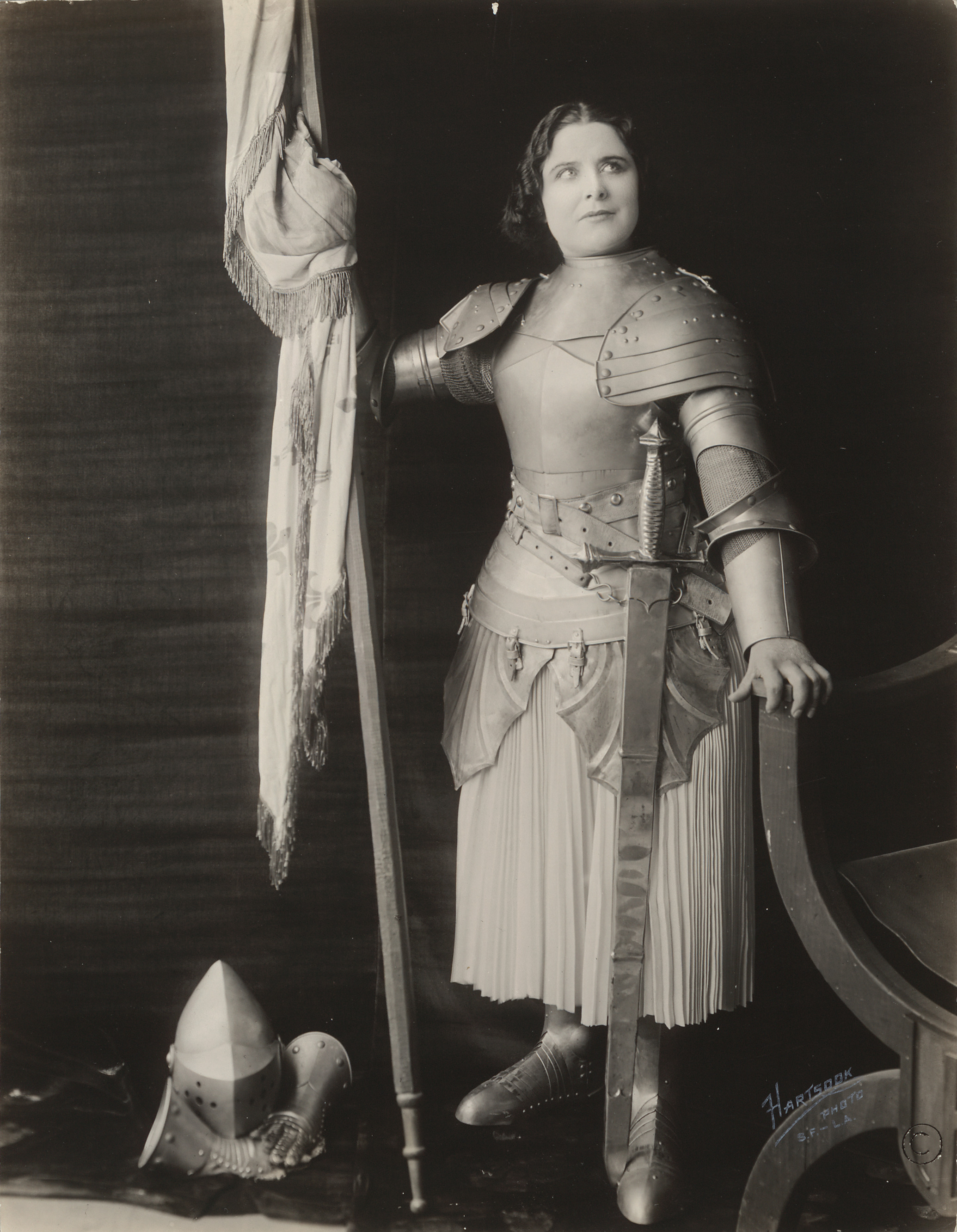
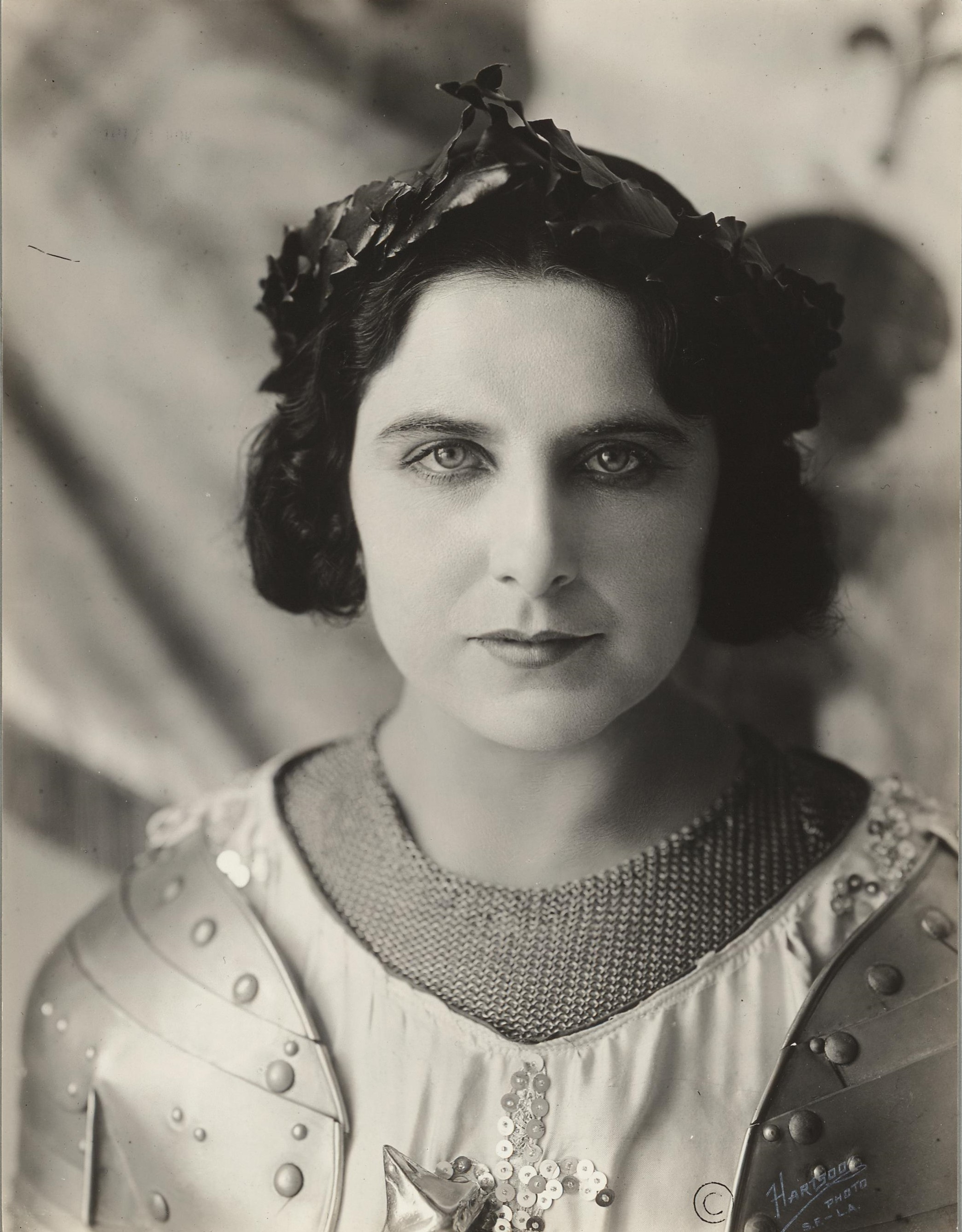
Geraldine Farrar as Joan of Arc
- Geraldine Farrar as Jeanne d'Arc (Joan of Arc)
- Raymond Hatton as Charles VII
- Hobart Bosworth as Gen. La Hire
- Theodore Roberts as Cauchon
- Wallace Reid as Eric Trent 1431 / Eric Trent 1917
- Charles Clary as La Tremouille
- James Neill as Laxart
- Tully Marshall as L'Oiseleur
- Lawrence Peyton as Gaspard
- Horace B. Carpenter as Jacques d'Arc
- Cleo Ridgely as The king's favorite
- Lillian Leighton as Isambeau
- Marjorie Daw as Katherine
- Stephen Gray as Pierre
- Ernest Joy as Robert de Beaudricourt
- John Oaker as Jean de Metz
- Hugo B. Koch as Duke of Burgundy
- William Conklin as John of Luxembourg
- Walter Long as The executioner
- William Elmer as Guy Townes
- Emilius Jorgensen as Michael
- Donald Crisp
- Jack Hoxie
- Lucien Littlefield
- Nigel De Brulier as Man at trial (uncredited)
- Jack Holt (uncredited)
- Fred Kohler as L'Oiseleur's henchman (uncredited)
- Ramón Novarro as Starving Peasant (uncredited)

== Production ==
The original plan for Joan the Woman was for it to be the first of two shorter, unrelated films starring Farrar and directed by DeMille. However, in the early stages of filming in May 1916, producer Jesse L. Lansky convinced DeMille to combine the two efforts into a single, longer film about Joan of Arc.

This was the first film to use the Handschiegl Color Process (billed as the "Wyckoff-DeMille Process") for certain scenes. This process is especially noticeable in the scene of Joan burning at the stake, the use of red and yellow gave this a heightened dramatic effect. DeMille has said that in the weeks before shooting he became obsessed with historical research, costume and set design, and casting decisions.

== Box Office ==
The film was released on December 25, 1916, and grossed $605,731 at the box office.

The success of Joan the Woman encouraged producer Jesse Lasky and DeMille to feature Farrar in another spectacle, The Woman God Forgot (1917), an epic set during the Aztec Empire.

== Retrospective appraisal ==
The film has been criticized by some as propaganda for World War I. The film begins and ends with the story of a British officer in the trenches fighting in World War I. He is prompted with the decision to participate in a suicide mission. He discovers a sword that belonged to Joan, and after hearing her story, decides to go on the mission. Film historian Robin Blaetz in her book Studies in Medievalism points out the sexism that exists in the film. While Joan was the inspiration for the British soldier's heroic acts, he is ultimately the hero at the end of the film. Blaetz points out that this sends the message that "women and war do not mix", alluding to the idea that in World War I women should stay behind the front lines, but still be supportive of those at war.

In his review of the film, Leonard Maltin said this was "DeMille's first historical epic is nicely mounted, spotlighting the heroism and sacrifice of Joan of Arc (a miscast Farrar) as she evolves from peasant girl to saint-like figure and becomes involved with Englishman Reid. Fashioned as an accolade to France, with the story bookended by sequences set during WW1 involving a soldier who is inspired by Joan's bravery. Some of the effects are in color."

== Attempted film piracy ==
In 1917 three men were arrested for the theft of a print of the film from a New York film exchange, which they took to New Jersey for the making of a new master negative. Both the missing print and the master were recovered. At that time there was an active criminal practice in making master negatives of American films for shipment to other countries for the production of new prints, an early example of motion picture piracy.

== Preservation ==
Complete prints of Joan the Woman are held by:

- Archives du Film du CNC on 35 mm film
- George Eastman Museum on 35 mm film
- Academy Film Archive
- British Film Institute

== See also ==
- Cultural depictions of Joan of Arc
- List of early color feature films
