= Walter Long (actor) =

American actor (1879–1952)

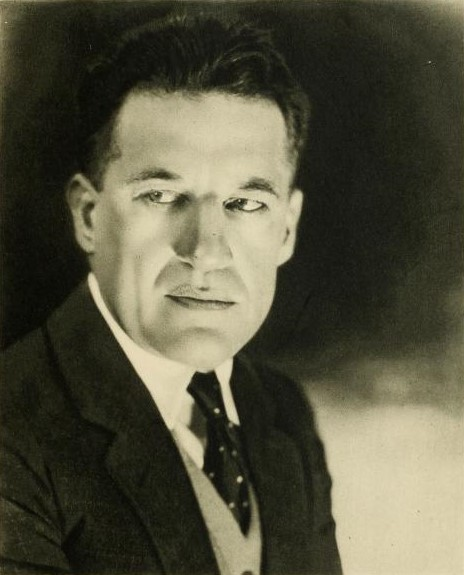
- Long in 1924
- Born: Walter Huntley Long; March 5, 1879; Nashua, New Hampshire, U.S.
- Died: July 4, 1952 (aged 73); Los Angeles, California, U.S.
- Burial place: Hollywood Forever Cemetery
- Occupation: Actor
- Years active: 1900–1950
- Spouses: Luray Grace Roblee (m. 1908; died 1919) Leta Amanda Held (m. 1923)
- Children: 1

Walter Huntley Long (March 5, 1879 – July 4, 1952) was an American stage and film character actor who between 1909 and the late 1940s performed in nearly 200 screen productions. He appeared in blackface in The Birth of a Nation, a film depicting black characters, such as the one portrayed by Long, as savage sexual predators and the Ku Klux Klan as society’s righteous protector.

Among his many other roles in both the silent and sound eras, he portrayed mostly crooks, tough guys, and comic villains, including in four short comedies with Laurel and Hardy. He played Miles Archer, Sam Spade's partner, in the first film of The Maltese Falcon (1931).

== Early life and career ==
Born in Nashua, New Hampshire, in 1879, Long was the youngest of six children of Catherine Lucia Jane (née Phillips) and Francis Long, who was a farmer.

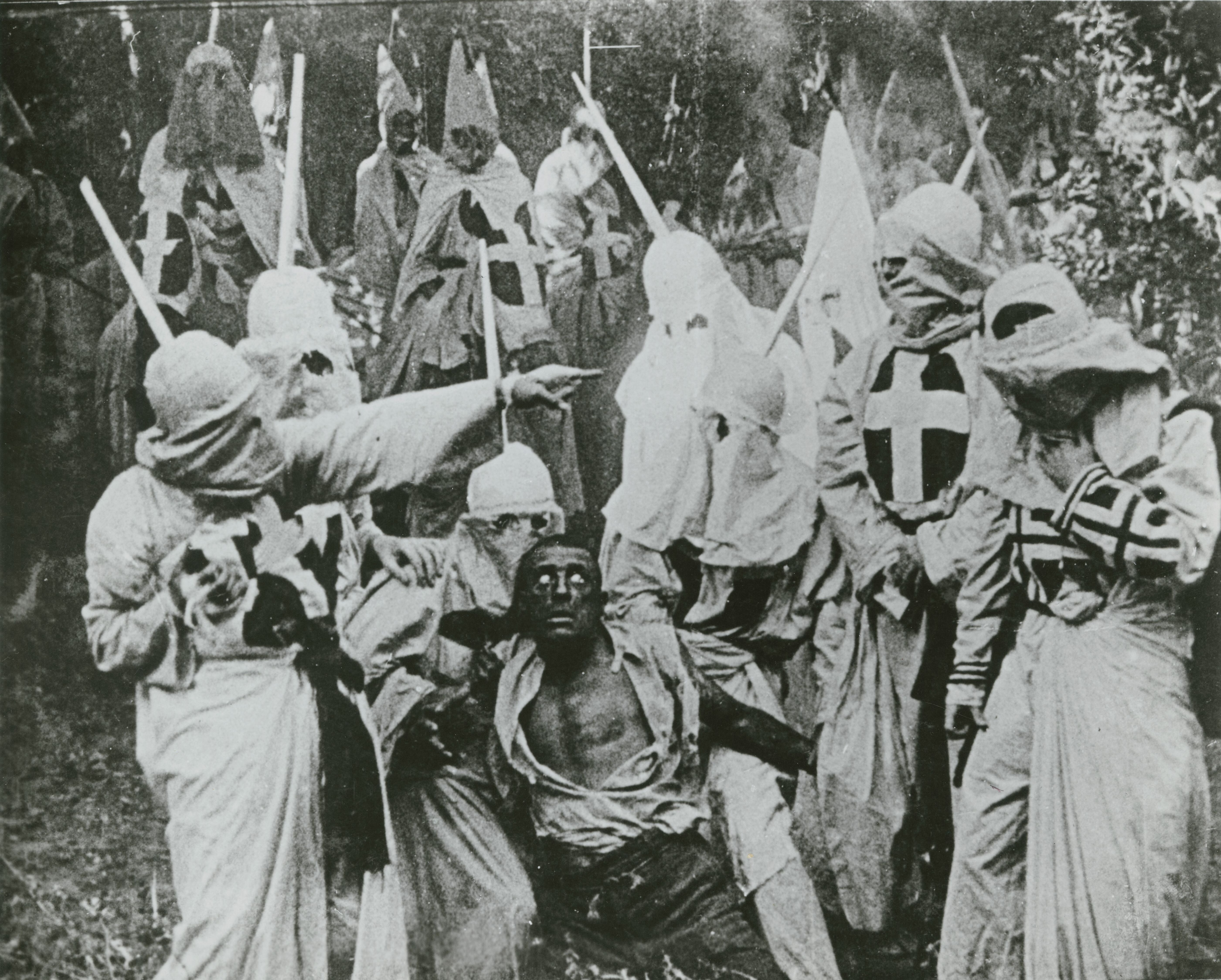
Hooded Klansmen catch "Gus", portrayed in blackface by Long, in The Birth of a Nation (1915)

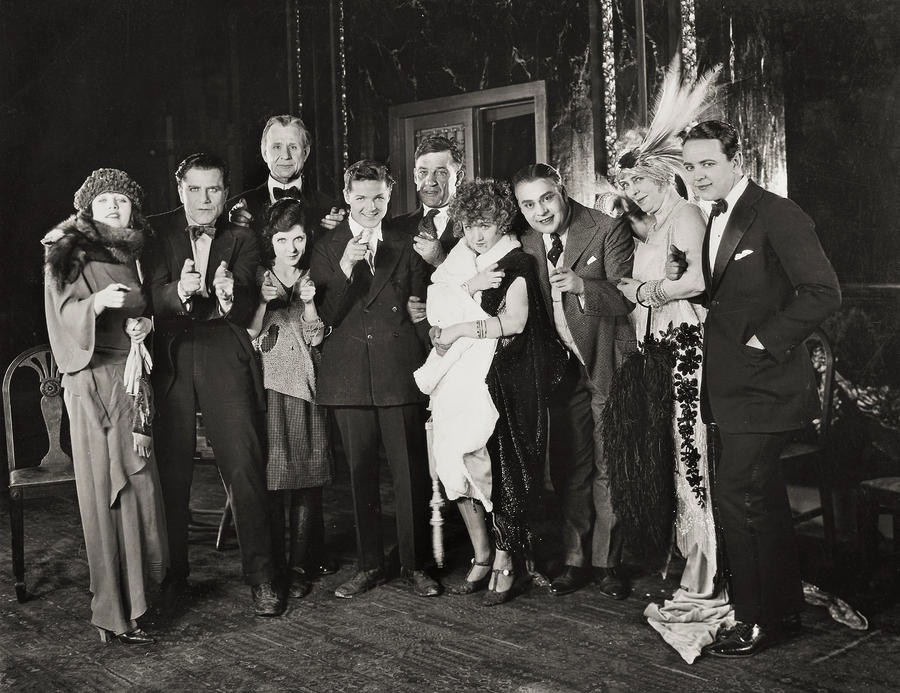
Long (sixth from left) with other cast members of the crime drama film Kick In (1922)

After acting on stage for years, Long debuted in motion pictures in 1909 with Broncho Billy Anderson. He disliked the working conditions in film production, so after that screen project he returned to the stage.

Long soon began to act again in motion pictures, over the years gaining recognition among theater audiences for being a popular "hissed-at villain". He can be seen in some of D. W. Griffith's early films, as well as Griffith's later, far more elaborate productions, most notably The Birth of a Nation (1915) and Intolerance (1916). In The Birth of a Nation, Long appears in blackface make-up as the African American character "Gus", and in Intolerance he portrays the "Musketeer", who operates within the crime-ridden slums of a modern American city. He was also cast as a supporting character for Rudolph Valentino in the films The Sheik (1921), Moran of the Lady Letty (1922), and Blood and Sand (1922). He also appears as a comic villain in four Laurel and Hardy shorts released in the early 1930s: as an abusive prisoner in Pardon Us (1931), a dissolute hotel owner and boxer in Any Old Port! (1932), an escaped convict in Going Bye-Bye! (1933), and as a gruff sea captain in The Live Ghost (1934).

On Broadway, Long performed in Adonis (1899), Leave It to Me! (1938), Very Warm for May (1939), Boys and Girls Together (1940), Follow the Girls (1944), and Toplitzky of Notre Dame (1946).

Although he was often called upon to play antagonists and villains because of his rugged appearance and gravelly voice, many people reported that off-camera he was actually a warm, kindhearted man.

== Military service ==
Long served in the United States Army during both world wars. During World War I, he was a first lieutenant of Coast Artillery and then promoted in rank to captain by the time the conflict ended in November 1918. He remained in the army reserves until World War II, when he was recalled to active duty, attaining the rank of lieutenant colonel before officially retiring from service with an honorable discharge in October 1944.

== Personal life and death ==
On May 6, 1908, in Escanaba, Michigan, Long married Luray Grace Roblee, a native of Wisconsin and a stenographer, who later became an actress at Triangle/Fine Arts. She died at the Pacific Hospital in downtown Los Angeles in 1919, at age 29, due to bronchial pneumonia contracted during the global "Spanish flu" epidemic. Over four years later in Los Angeles, on October 16, 1923, Long married California native Leta Amanda Held. The couple adopted a son whom they named John Huntley Long.

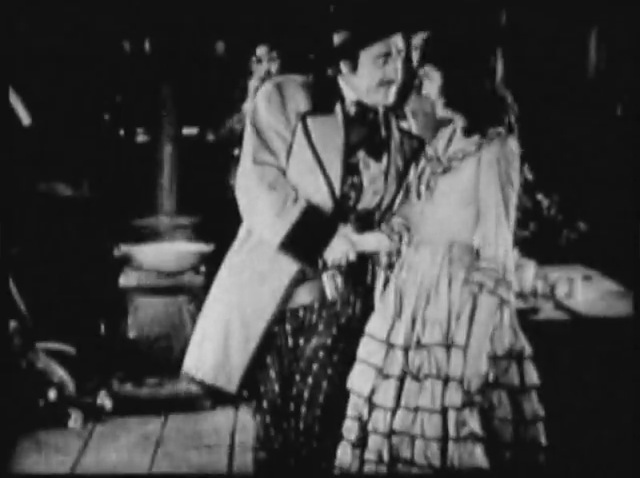
Long and Carol Dempster in the Western drama Scarlet Days (1919)

Long died of a heart attack in California on July 4, 1952, after watching the Independence Day fireworks display at the Los Angeles Memorial Coliseum. In its obituary for the actor published two days after his death, the Los Angeles Times notes, "Long and his wife, Leta, both of 632 North Cahuenga Blvd., had just left the Coliseum when he was stricken." Long's grave is located in the "Garden of Memory" at Hollywood Forever Cemetery in Los Angeles.

== Filmography ==
Year	Title	Genre	Role	Notes
1910	The Fugitive	Drama	Unknown role	Short
1911	The Primal Call	Drama	Unknown role	Short
1911	Bobby, the Coward	Drama	Unknown role	Short
1912	The Girl and Her Trust	Drama	Grace's Bashful Suitor (uncredited)	Short
1912	The Painted Lady	Drama	Unknown role	Short
1912	The Musketeers of Pig Alley	Drama	Unknown role	Credited as the first gangster film in history.
1913	The Deerslayer	Drama	Indian (uncredited)	Short
1913	Traffic in Souls	Drama	Policeman	
1914	The Broken Bottle	Drama	Unknown role	
1914	The Life of General Villa	Action-drama	Federal Officer	Pancho Villa plays himself.
1914	Home, Sweet Home	Drama	himself	Biographical film
1914	The Escape	Drama	Unknown role	Now considered a lost film.
1914	Dan Morgan's Way	Drama	Dick Ramsey	Short
1914	Blue Pete's Escape	Western	Chicago Red	Short
1914	The Avenging Conscience	Drama	Detective (uncredited)	Based on "The Tell-Tale Heart".
1914	Where the Mountains Meet	Unknown role	Himself	Short
1914	The Revenue Officer's Deputy	Drama	Bruner	Short
1914	Ethel Has a Steady	Comedy	Unknown role	Short
1914	Bobby's Medal	Drama	Unknown role	Short
1915	The Birth of a Nation	Drama	Gus – a renegade Negro	
1915	A Man and His Mate		Taylor	
1915	The Outlaw's Revenge		Federal officer	
1915	The Highbinders	Crime	Pat Gallagher	Short
1915	Little Marie			Short
1915	Jordan Is a Hard Road		Agent	
1915	Martyrs of the Alamo		Santa Anna	
1916	Let Katie Do It	Drama	Pedro Garcia	
1916	Daphne and the Pirate	Drama	Jamie d'Arcy	Starring Lillian Gish
1916	Sold for Marriage	Drama	Col. Gregioff	
1916	The Children in the House		Al Fellower	
1916	The Marriage of Molly-O		Joseph McGuire	
1916	Intolerance	Drama	Musketeer of the Slums	
1916	Unprotected	Drama	Joshua Craig	
1916	The Years of the Locust	Drama	Aaron Roth	
1916	Joan the Woman	Epic drama	Executioner	Joan of Arc
1917	The Evil Eye	Drama	Mexican Joe	
1917	The Golden Fetter	Romance	McGill	
1917	Each to His Kind	Drama	Mulai Singh	Lost film
1917	The Winning of Sally Temple	Drama	Duke of Chatto	
1917	The Cost of Hatred	Drama	Jefe Politico	
1917	A Romance of the Redwoods	Drama	Sheriff	Starring Mary Pickford
1917	The Little American	Romantic war drama	German Captain	
1917	Hashimura Togo	Comedy	Carlos Anthony	
1917	The Woman God Forgot	Romance	Taloc (High Priest)	
1919	The Poppy Girl's Husband	Drama	Boston Blackie	
1919	Chasing Rainbows	Western	Lacy	
1919	The Mother and the Law		The Musketeer of the Town	
1919	Scarlet Days	Western	King Bagley, aka Knight of the Black Stain	
1919	Desert Gold	Horseracing melodrama	Rojas	
1919	An Adventure in Hearts	Adventure	Guilamo Sevier	Lost film
1920	The Fighting Shepherdess		Pete Mullendore	
1920	Excuse My Dust	Comedy drama	Ritz	
1920	The Third Woman		Scar Norton	
1920	The Sea Wolf	Drama	Black Harris, the Mate	
1920	Go and Get It	Mystery Comedy drama	Jim Hogan	
1920	Held In Trust	Romance	Hasbrouck Rutherford	Lost film
1920	What Women Love	Comedy drama	Captain Buck Nelson	Lost film
1921	Tiger True		Old Whitey / the Baboon	
1921	The Fire Cat		Gringo Burke	
1921	White and Unmarried	Comedy	Chicoq	
1921	A Giant of His Race			
1921	The Sheik	Drama	Omair – the bandit	Starring Rudolph Valentino
1922	Moran of the Lady Letty		This film is available on DVD through Flicker Alley	
1922	Across the Continent		Dutton Tyler	Lost film
1922	The Dictator	Comedy drama	Mike "Bigg" Dooley	
1922	South of Suva	Drama	Sydney Latimer	Lost film
1922	Blood and Sand	Drama	Plumitas	Starring Rudolph Valentino
1922	To Have and to Hold	Drama	Red Gill	
1922	Shadows		Daniel Gibbs	
1922	The Beautiful and Damned	Drama	Hull	
1922	Kick In	Drama	Whip Fogarty	
1922	Omar the Tentmaker	Drama	Executioner	
1922	My American Wife	Drama	Gomez	
1923	The Last Hour		Red Brown	
1923	Quicksands		Ring member	
1923	The Isle of Lost Ships		Peter Forbes	
1923	The Little Church Around the Corner		Big Hex Poulon	
1923	The Shock		The captain	
1923	The Huntress		Joe Hagland	
1923	The Call of the Wild		Hagin	
1923	Desire		Bud Reisner	
1923	The Broken Wing		Captain Innocencio Dos Santos	
1923	A Shot in the Night			
1924	Yankee Madness		Pablo del Gardo	
1924	Missing Daughters		Guy Benson	
1924	Daring Love		Red Bishop	
1924	Wine	Comedy drama	Benedict, Count Montebello	
1924	White Man		The River Thief	
1924	The Ridin' Kid from Powder River	Western	Steve Lanning	
1925	The Lady	drama	Blackie	
1925	The Reckless Sex			
1925	The Shock Punch	boxing drama	Bull Malarkey	
1925	The Verdict	mystery	Convict Fred Windemere	
1925	Soul-Fire		Herbert Jones Sailor	
1925	Raffles, the Amateur Cracksman		Crawshay	
1925	Bobbed Hair		Doc	
1925	The Road to Yesterday		Rowdy in Burning-at-the-Stake Scene (uncredited)	
1925	Steel Preferred		Redface	
1926	Red Dice	Crime drama	Nick Webb	
1926	The Highbinders		Bill Dorgan	
1926	Things Wives Tell		Ben Felton	
1926	Eve's Leaves		Chanz Fang	
1926	West of Broadway	Comedy-western	Bad Willie	
1926	Jim, the Conqueror	Western	Hank Milford	
1927	Jewels of Desire		Pedro, aka Jose Hernandez	
1927	The Yankee Clipper		Portuguese Joe	
1927	White Pants Willie		Mock Epply	
1927	Back to God's Country		Captain Blake	
1927	Chicago		Flynn's Thug (uncredited)	
1928	Thundergod		Bruce Drossler	
1928	Gang War		Mike Luego	
1928	Forbidden Grass			
1928	Me, Gangster		Gangster (uncredited)	
1928	Black Cargoes of the South Seas	Action drama	Fursey	
1929	The Black Watch		Harrim Bey	
1930	Beau Bandit		Bobcat	
1930	Conspiracy	Mystery melodrama	Weinberg	
1930	Moby Dick		Stubbs	
1931	Sea Devils		Johnson the first mate	
1931	Other Men's Women	drama	Bixby	
1931	Los presidiarios		El Tigre (uncredited)	
1931	The Maltese Falcon		Miles Archer	
1931	Pardon Us	comedy	The Tiger	Laurel & Hardy film
1931	Sous les verrous		Le Tigre	
1931	Soul of the Slums	Melodrama	Pete Thompson	
1931	Dragnet Patrol	Melodrama	Jim Grainger	
1932	Ship a Hooey	Comedy	CPO Long	
1932	Any Old Port!	Comedy	Mugsie Long	Laurel & Hardy short
1932	Escapade	Crime	Gympy McLane	
1932	Cornered	Western	Henchman Slade	
1932	I Am a Fugitive from a Chain Gang	Crime drama	Blacksmith (uncredited)	
1932	Women Won't Tell	Drama	Joe Kummer	
1932	Call Her Savage		Man Who Tries to Pick Up Nasa (uncredited)	
1932	Silver Dollar		Sick Miner Selling Mine to Yates (uncredited)	
1933	Laughter in Hell		Chain Gang Member (uncredited)	
1933	Blondie Johnson		Artie (uncredited)	
1933	Easy Millions			
1933	Aggie Appleby, Maker of Men		Red's Prison Cellmate (uncredited)	
1934	Fugitive Lovers		Prison Guard (uncredited)	
1934	Six of a Kind		Hold-Up Man (uncredited)	
1934	The House of Rothschild		Prussian Soldier (uncredited)	
1934	Lazy River		Buck – Prisoner (uncredited)	
1934	The Thin Man		Stutsy Burke (uncredited)	
1934	Operation 13		Operator 55	
1934	Going Bye-Bye!	Comedy	Butch Long	Laurel & Hardy short
1934	Lightning Strikes Twice		Policeman (uncredited)	
1934	Three Little Pigskins	comedy	Joe Stacks (uncredited)	Three Stooges film
1934	The Live Ghost	Comedy	Sea Captain	Laurel & Hardy short
1935	The Whole Town's Talking		Convict (uncredited)	
1935	Naughty Marietta		Pirate Leader (uncredited)	
1935	Here Comes Cookie		Tramp (uncredited)	
1935	Annie Oakley		Dan – First Indian Hater (uncredited)	
1935	Frisco Kid		Gambling Miner (uncredited)	
1936	Drift Fence	western	Bev Wilson, neighbor	
1936	Sutter's Gold		Sailor (uncredited)	
1936	The Glory Trail		Riley – Renegade Leader	
1936	Wedding Present		Gangster (uncredited)	
1936	The Accusing Finger		Convict (uncredited)	
1936	The Bold Caballero	adventure	Guard	
1937	Dick Tracy		Whitey (uncredited)	Serial
1937	Pick a Star	musical comedy	Bandit	
1937	North of the Rio Grande	Western	Patrick "Buck" O'Hara	
1937	Hoosier Schoolboy		Riley	
1937	Federal Bullets		Henchman	
1938	The Painted Trail		Gang Leader Driscoll	
1938	Six Shootin' Sheriff	Western	Gang leader Chuck	
1938	Bar 20 Justice	Western	Duke Pierce	
1938	Man's Country		Lex Crane / Buck Crane	
1938	Prison Break		Convict (uncredited)	
1938	Wild Horse Canyon	Western	Roscoe	
1939	Union Pacific		Irishman (uncredited)	
1939	Daughter of the Tong		Henchman (uncredited)	
1939	Flaming Lead	Western	Big Jim Greely	
1939	Fighting Mad		Frenchy	
1940	Dark Command		Townsman (uncredited)	
1940	Men Without Souls		Fireman (uncredited)	
1940	Hidden Gold		Henchman Sanford (uncredited)	
1940	When the Daltons Rode		Deputy on Train (uncredited)	
1941	Ridin' on a Rainbow		Three Feathers Bartender (uncredited)	
1941	A Man Betrayed		Henchman Asking About Pete and Louie (uncredited)	
1941	City of Missing Girls	drama	Officer Larkin	
1941	Lady from Louisiana		Lottery Thug (uncredited)	
1941	Silver Stallion	Action adventure	Benson	
1941	I Was a Prisoner on Devil's Island		Captain Quinez (uncredited)	
1945	Dillinger		Mug in Police Lineup (uncredited)	
1948	No More Relatives	Comedy	Joe	Edgar Kennedy short
