= Any Old Port! =

1932 film

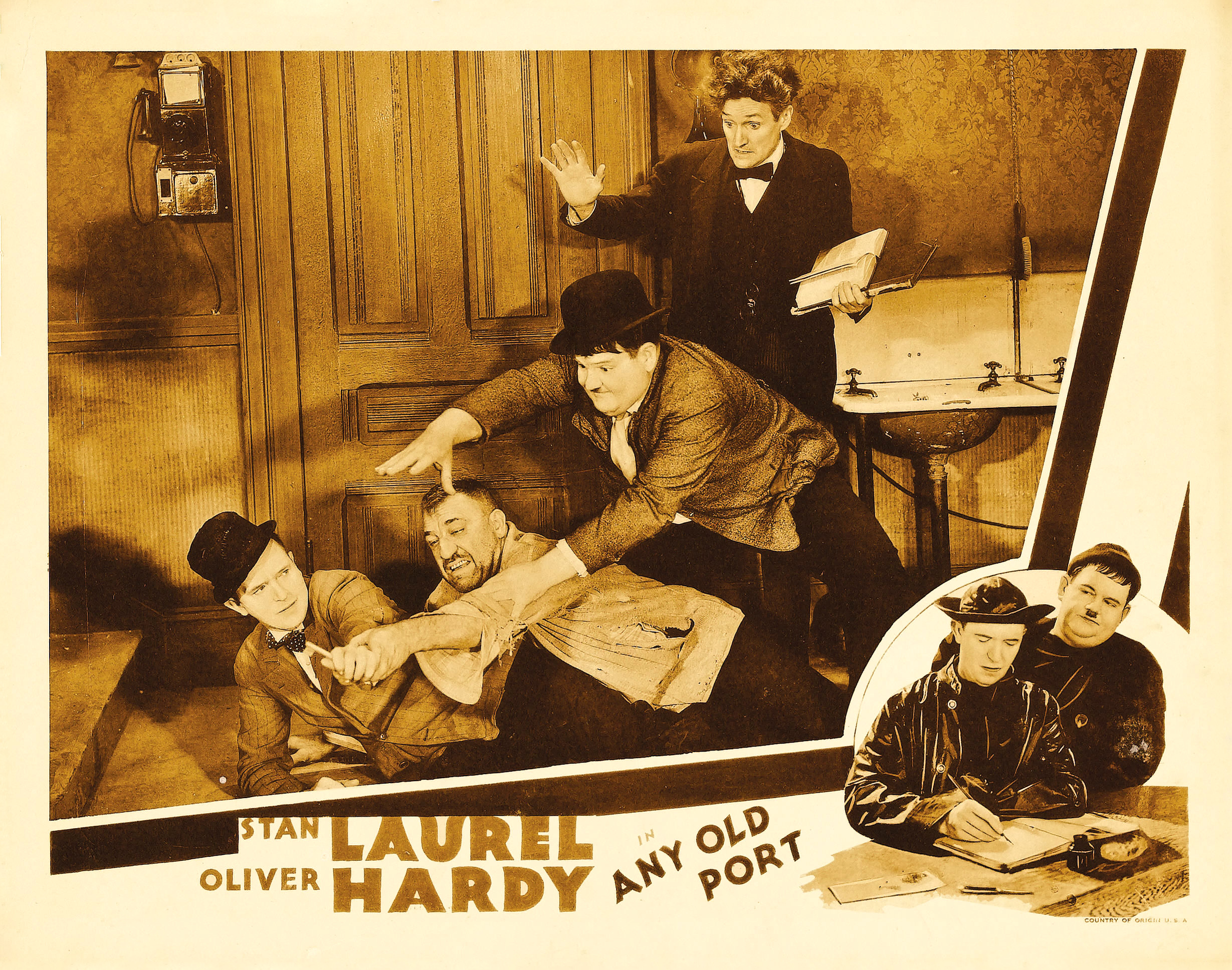
- Directed by: James W. Horne
- Written by: H. M. Walker
- Produced by: Hal Roach
- Starring: Stan Laurel; Oliver Hardy
- Cinematography: Art Lloyd
- Edited by: Richard C. Currier
- Music by: Marvin Hatley; Leroy Shield
- Distributed by: Metro-Goldwyn-Mayer
- Release date: March 5, 1932
- Running time: 21:07
- Country: United States
- Language: English

Any Old Port! is an American 1932 pre-Code comedy short film directed by James W. Horne and starring Laurel and Hardy. It was produced by Hal Roach.

== Plot ==
Sailors Laurel and Hardy arrive in a coastal town and secure accommodation at a budget hotel under the proprietorship of Mugsy Long, characterized by his rough demeanor. Long harbors intentions of coercing the hotel's maid into marriage, against her wishes, resorting to locking her in a closet. Observing this, Laurel and Hardy initially resolve to intervene but reconsider when faced with Long's formidable presence, as evidenced by the ineffectiveness of projectiles hurled at him. However, during the arrival of a judge for the impending wedding ceremony, Stan seizes the opportunity to liberate the trapped maid by obtaining the closet key, inciting a pursuit during which he facilitates her escape.

Employing deception, Laurel convinces Long to leap from a nearby dock by misleading him with a decoy key tossed into the water. In the aftermath, Long, nursing a grudge, vows retribution. Subsequently, Laurel and Hardy realize they left their funds in their hotel room but are offered $50 by an acquaintance of Ollie's to engage in a boxing match later that evening. Ollie, in a predictable turn, designates Stan as the pugilist while assuming the role of manager.

Upon entering the ring, Stan confronts Mugsy Long, a formidable adversary. Sensing Long's formidable prowess, Ollie strikes a bet with an inebriated spectator, wagering on Long's victory. Incensed at encountering Stan, Long clandestinely fortifies his glove with metal. However, a comedic mishap leads to a glove switch between Stan and Long during the bout, prompting Long's panicked retreat upon realizing Stan's advantage. Stan capitalizes on this twist of fate, chasing Long around the ring and ultimately triumphing when Long inadvertently incapacitates himself while attempting to remove the loaded glove from Stan's hand.

Subsequently, Long's associate alerts a nearby policeman to Stan's alleged use of a loaded glove. Despite their victory, Ollie relinquishes the prize money to the bettor, revealing his bet against Stan. Stan, feeling betrayed, inadvertently incapacitates the investigating officer while attempting to confront Ollie, prompting a hasty retreat.

== Cast ==
=== Credited ===
- Stan Laurel as Stan Laurel
- Oliver Hardy as Oliver Hardy
- Walter Long as Mugsie Long, Proprietor of Ye Mariner's Rest
- Julie Bishop as Bride (as Jacqueline Wells)

=== Uncredited ===
- Harry Bernard as Boxing Promoter
- Bobby Burns as Justice of the Peace
- Sam Lufkin as Referee
- Dick Gilbert as Mugsy's Second
- Charlie Hall as Stan's Second
- Eddie Baker as Police Chief
- Ed Brandenburg as Spectator
- Sammy Brooks as Spectator
- Baldwin Cooke as Spectator
- Helen Gilmore as Spectator
- Pete Gordon as Mugsy's Second
- Jack Hill as Spectator
- Charles Lloyd as Spectator
- Will Stanton as Drunk
- Frank Terry as Lunch Wagon Owner
- Harry Wilde as Boxing spectator
