= In Fast Company (1924 film) =

1924 film

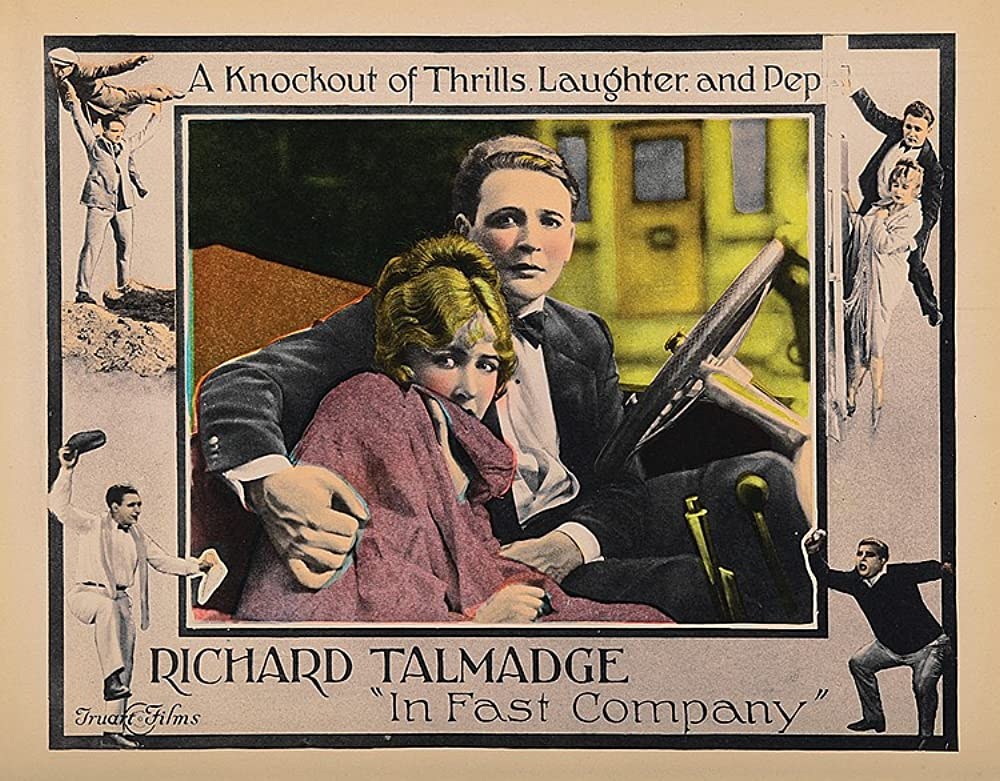
- Directed by: James W. Horne
- Written by: Alfred A. Cohn; Garrett Fort; Ralph Spence
- Produced by: M. H. Hoffman
- Starring: Richard Talmadge; Mildred Harris; Sheldon Lewis
- Cinematography: William Marshall
- Production company: Carlos Productions
- Distributed by: Truart Film Corporation
- Release date: June 6, 1924
- Running time: 60 minutes
- Country: United States
- Languages: Silent; English intertitles

In Fast Company is a 1924 American silent action film directed by James W. Horne and starring Richard Talmadge, Mildred Harris and Sheldon Lewis.

== Cast ==
- Richard Talmadge as Perry Whitman Jr.
- Mildred Harris as Barbara Belden
- Sheldon Lewis as Drexel Draig
- Douglas Gerrard as Reginald Chichester
- Jack Herrick as The 'Bolivian Bull'
- Charles Clary as Perry Whitman Sr.
- Snitz Edwards as Mike Ricketts
- Lydia Yeamans Titus as Maid

== Preservation ==
This title is preserved at EYE Film Institute Netherlands.

== Bibliography ==
- Munden, Kenneth White. The American Film Institute Catalog of Motion Pictures Produced in the United States, Part 1. University of California Press, 1997.
