= The Wild Horse Stampede =

1926 film directed by Clifford Smith

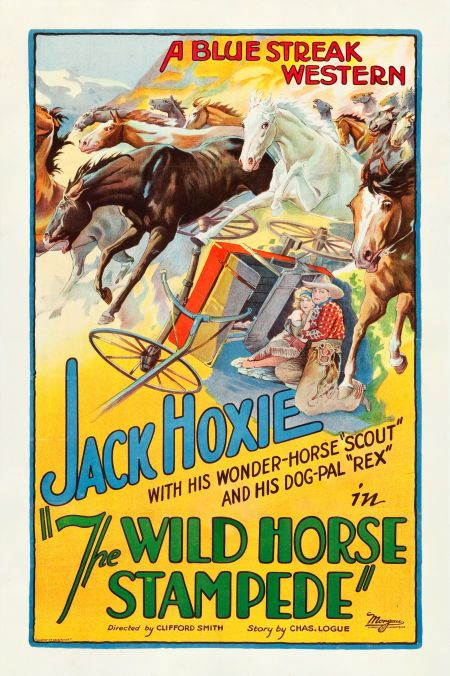
- Film poster
- Directed by: Clifford Smith
- Written by: Doris Malloy
- Based on: "Blind Trails" by W. C. Tuttle
- Produced by: Carl Laemmle
- Starring: Jack Hoxie; Fay Wray; Marin Sais
- Cinematography: William Nobles
- Production company: Universal Pictures
- Distributed by: Universal Pictures
- Release date: September 5, 1926
- Running time: 5 reels
- Country: United States
- Language: Silent (English intertitles)

The Wild Horse Stampede is a 1926 American silent Western film directed by Clifford Smith and starring Jack Hoxie, Fay Wray, and Marin Sais.

== Plot ==
As described in a film magazine review, Jack Tanner is in love with rancher Cross Hayden's daughter Jessie, but cannot marry her due to a lack of funds. His opportunity comes when he proposes to the rancher that he will corral a large herd of wild horses that have been eating up the range and spoiling it for the cattle. The rancher accepts the sporting offer, and Jack has ten days to accomplish the task. Then Jack encounters a mysterious woman on the range. He allows her to use his shack as a shelter while he endeavors to round up the herd of horses. Of course, the rancher's daughter Jessie discovers that a strange woman is living in Jack's shack, and outs the worst interpretation on this affair. She throws Jack over and accepts the proposal of Jack's rival, Charlie Champion. He has his henchmen stampede the cattle while he takes Jessie to town to be married. The mysterious woman discloses to Jack that she is Grace Connor, and is the wife of his rival, who has deserted her. A wild chase then ensues with Jack after the couple. The herd of stampeding horses bears down on the wagon carrying the couple. Jack succeeds in saving the young woman, but her companion is trampled under the hoofs of the fleeing animals, leaving Jessie with Jack.

== Cast ==
- Jack Hoxie as Jack Tanner
- Fay Wray as Jessie Hayden
- William Steele as Charlie Champion
- Marin Sais as Grace Connor
- Clark Comstock as Cross Hayden
- Jack Pratt as Henchman
- Art Mix as Henchman
- Bert De Marc as Henchman
- Monte Montague as Henchman

== Preservation ==
A print of The Wild Horse Stampede is held in the Gosfilmofond in Moscow.

== Bibliography ==
- Munden, Kenneth White. The American Film Institute Catalog of Motion Pictures Produced in the United States, Part 1. University of California Press, 1997.
