= Lawrence Peyton =

American actor

Lawrence Peyton (died October 10, 1918) was a silent film actor in the United States. He starred in the 1914 film based on Jack London's Martin Eden.

== Personal life ==
Peyton served as a private in the 813th Pioneer Infantry Regiment of the United States Army during World War I. He was killed in action in France on October 10, 1918, and was buried at the Oise-Aisne American Cemetery.

== Filmography ==
- When the Blood Calls (1913) with Mona Darkfeather
- Martin Eden (1914)
- The Boer War (1914)
- The Unafraid (1915)
- A Gentleman of Leisure (1915)
- The Goose Girl (1915)
- Buck's Lady Friend (1915)
- A Man's Friend (1916)
- Joan the Woman (1916)
- Joan of the Angels (1916)
- The Red Ace (1917)
- The Golden Fetter (1917)
- How Could You, Jean? (1918)
