= Riders of the Law =

1922 film

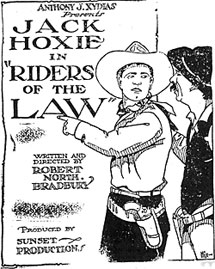
- Directed by: Robert N. Bradbury
- Written by: Robert N. Bradbury
- Produced by: Anthony J. Xydias
- Starring: Jack Hoxie; Marin Sais; Frank Rice
- Cinematography: Bert Longenecker
- Production company: Sunset Productions
- Distributed by: Aywon Film Corporation
- Release date: December 15, 1922
- Running time: 52 minutes
- Country: United States
- Languages: Silent; English intertitles

Riders of the Law is a 1922 American silent Western film directed by Robert N. Bradbury and starring Jack Hoxie, Marin Sais and Frank Rice.

== Synopsis ==
A man battles whiskey smugglers near the Canada–United States border.

== Cast ==
- Jack Hoxie as Jack Meadows
- Marin Sais as Barbara Layne
- Frank Rice as Toby Jones
- Pat Harmon as Deputy Dan Silo
- Thomas G. Lingham as Sheriff Layne
- Jack P. Pierce as Pete Gushard
- Frank Jonasson as Ace Brokaw
- Sonny Hicks as Young Boy

== Bibliography ==
- Munden, Kenneth White. The American Film Institute Catalog of Motion Pictures Produced in the United States, Part 1. University of California Press, 1997.
