= Stingaree (1934 film) =

1934 film by William A. Wellman

- Theatrical release poster
- Directed by: William A. Wellman
- Written by: Lynn Riggs; Leonard Spigelgass
- Screenplay by: Becky Gardiner; Garrett Fort; Agnes Christine Johnston; Wells Root; Dwight Taylor
- Based on: Stingaree; 1905 novel by E.W. Hornung
- Produced by: Pandro S. Berman; David Lewis
- Starring: Irene Dunne; Richard Dix
- Cinematography: James Van Trees
- Edited by: James B. Morley
- Music by: Max Steiner
- Production company: RKO Radio Pictures
- Distributed by: RKO Radio Pictures
- Release date: May 25, 1934
- Running time: 77 minutes
- Country: United States
- Language: English
- Budget: $408,000
- Box office: $563,000

Stingaree is an American pre-Code romantic drama film directed by William A. Wellman released by RKO Radio Pictures in 1934. The film was based on a 1905 novel by Ernest William Hornung. Set in Australia, it stars Irene Dunne as Hilda Bouverie and Richard Dix as Stingaree. Hollywood had previously filmed the Hornung story as serials in 1915 and 1917, starring True Boardman.

Producer David Lewis wrote, "Bill Wellman has been quoted as saying that Stingaree was the worst movie he was ever associated with, and I’m sure it was. I can’t say it was the worst movie I ever made, but it was among the worst."

== Plot ==
In 1874 Australia, newly installed Police Inspector Radford boasts to wealthy Hugh Clarkson that he will capture the famous outlaw Stingaree, who has returned to the area. Hilda Bouverie is an impoverished servant working for the Clarksons. Mr. Clarkson is kind, but his wife treats Hilda and Annie, another servant, as menials. Mrs. Clarkson is excited by the news that Sir Julian Kent, a renowned British composer, is going to be her guest. She dreams of performing before him and becoming an opera star, but her singing is not good. Hilda begs to be allowed to sing as well, but Mrs. Clarkson turns her down. Meanwhile, Sir Julian stops over at a tavern, where Radford and his colleagues are drinking. When Stingaree enters, the policemen are suspicious of the stranger; he is searched, but no weapon is found. His sidekick Howie follows, only he is armed. They abduct Sir Julian. Unaware of this, Mrs. Clarkson goes off to meet Sir Julian.

While she is away, Hilda, who dreams of being an opera singer herself, plays Sir Julian's new song. When Stingaree enters the Clarkson residence to reconnoitre for a future robbery, she mistakes him for Sir Julian and sings for him. He is entranced, and praises her talent. When the Clarksons return, they are accompanied by Radford, who eventually recalls Stingaree. Unmasked, he flees, taking Hilda with him. When they reach his hideout, Stingaree is annoyed to find that Howie has let Sir Julian escape, foiling his attempt to get her an audition. Hilda tells him that her parents had the dream of singing, and that when they died she inherited the dream. Then Stingaree kisses her.

Sir Julian attends a recital at the Clarksons house, with Mrs. Clarkson singing his song disastrously. Howie holds the guests at gunpoint while Stingaree accompanies Hilda on the piano. Sir Julian is greatly impressed by her singing. As the guests congratulate her, Stingaree and Howie slip away. However, Radford manages to shoot and arrest Stingaree. When a furious Mrs. Clarkson fires Hilda, Sir Julian invites her to Europe. Hilda refuses, unwilling to abandon Stingaree, but then she receives a letter from him telling her to pursue her dream, and that he gave up his freedom for her. She leaves, taking Annie with her. Under Sir Julian's tutelage, she becomes a famous opera singer.

Though she cannot forget Stingaree, she agrees to marry Sir Julian. The night before the wedding, however, she tells him that she cannot go through with it. She is going to give up her career and return to Australia. He persuades her to perform at a concert in Melbourne, hoping that the contrast with the fabulous opera houses of Europe will change her mind. Meanwhile, Stingaree escapes, and holds up the new Governor-General's stagecoach. He borrows the man's uniform and attends the concert disguised as him. When he is recognized, the police pursue him. He sneaks into Hilda's dressing room. Hilda offers to give up her singing career for him. As the police try to break down the door, he picks her up in his arms and escapes through the window. They ride off together on his horse.

== Cast ==
- Irene Dunne as Hilda Bouverie
- Richard Dix as Stingaree
- Mary Boland as Mrs. Clarkson
- Conway Tearle as Sir Julian Kent
- Andy Devine as Howie
- Henry Stephenson as Mr. Hugh Clarkson
- George Barraud as Inspector Radford
- Una O'Connor as Annie
- "Snub" Pollard as Victor
- Reginald Owen as The Governor-General
- Billy Bevan as Mac
- Robert Greig as The Innkeeper
- Arthur Clayton as Constable

== Production ==
In June 1933, RKO, then under production chief Merian C. Cooper, purchased rights to the stories as a vehicle for Irene Dunne. The story was described as being about an "Australian Robin Hood."

Producer David Lewis said he was asked to make it by Cooper as he was too busy. "After reading it, I found it something less than easy to warm up to," wrote Lewis. "Coop knew that but still wanted me to try it."

Lewis got in Lynn Riggs and Leonard Spiegelglass to write the script which the producer called "a bugger... it was just murder. Everything they brought in was loose and undramatic. Riggs was a very good dramatist and Spigelgass had an impressive gift for dialogue, but somehow it just didn’t jell. Basically it wasn’t much of a story; it had no structure. It was about an Australian opera singer who returns to her native land for a tour and is kidnapped by the bandit." Lewis brought in a new writer, Becky Gardner, but said "she kept promising to deliver script, but she always had an excuse for not delivering script." However the producer said "he finally did a script with some material that would play. Her script was very pedestrian, but it was a complete script: it had a beginning, a middle, and an end, which God knows Spigelgass and Riggs had been unable to come up with."

In October 1933 Dunne signed a new two-year contract with RKO the first film of which was to be Stingaree with Richard Dix, with whom she had made the highly successful Cimarron. Later that month RKO announced the male lead would be Leslie Banks with Ernest B. Schoesdak to direct. Then Banks left to sign a contract with Fox.

RKO decided to replace him with John Boles, but he was not available, pushing back shooting so Dunne could make Age of Innocence. Then Boles dropped out and RKO decided to use Dix.

According to Lewis, at one stage Irene Dunne was equivocating about appearing in the film and he considered replacing her with Grace Moore, who wanted to make it. However Cooper then resigned as head of production at RKO and was replaced by Padro S Berman who insisted Lewis use Dunne.

Filming started January 1934. Sheep were imported from Camarialla.

Lewis later wrote " I never knew why Wellman even did the film. He had won an Academy Award seven years before and was considered a top director. He was also a wild man who proudly hated all producers."

== Reception ==
=== Box Office ===
According to RKO records, the film lost the studio $49,000.

=== Critical ===
In 1934, Mordaunt Hall's review in The New York Times called the film "nicely done" and said that its "impossible happenings are highly entertaining." He went on to say that "Miss Dunne gives a charming performance and she sings several songs very agreeably."

The Los Angeles Times called it "impossible but interesting."

The film received mixed reviews in Australia. Released during preparations for the centennial celebration in Melbourne, it was described by one local paper as a "pleasant trifle" while another found it "hard to swallow" with its plot being "a little too improbable for anyone, let alone an Australian audience."

It screened in Australia in every state except New South Wales where there was a ban on bushranger films.

Lewis wrote "I was later quite surprised when the film received good notices and even played the Radio City Music Hall."

== Preservation status and home media ==
In 1946, Stingaree, in addition to several other films, were sold out of the RKO library to producer Merian C. Cooper. On April 4 and April 11, 2007, Turner Classic Movies premiered films produced by Cooper at RKO but out of distribution for more than 50 years. According to TCM host Robert Osborne, Cooper agreed to a legal settlement with RKO in 1946, after accusing RKO of not giving him all the money due him from his RKO producer's contract in the 1930s.

The settlement gave Cooper complete ownership of several RKO titles, including Rafter Romance (1933) with Ginger Rogers, Double Harness (1933), The Right to Romance (1933), One Man's Journey (1933) with Lionel Barrymore, Living on Love (1937), and A Man to Remember (1938). According to an interview with a retired RKO executive, used as a promo on TCM for the premiere, Cooper allowed these films to be shown in 1955–1956 in a limited re-release and only in New York City.

Turner Entertainment purchased the rights to Stingaree, Turner Classic Movies remastered and released the films on DVD as part of their Lost RKO Collection. Until the rights were purchased by Turner and released on DVD, Stingaree had not been seen since a single television viewing in the late 1950s.

== Notes ==
- Lewis, David (1993). Curtis, James (ed.). The Creative Producer. Metuchen: Scarecrow Press. ISBN 0-8108-2720-4.
