= A Whirlwind of Whiskers =

- Directed by: Alfred Santell
- Written by: Frank Howard Clark; Phil Lang
- Produced by: Kalem Company
- Starring: Lloyd Hamilton; Bud Duncan
- Distributed by: General Film Company
- Release date: October 19, 1917
- Running time: 2 reels
- Country: USA
- Language: silent..English titles

A Whirlwind of Whiskers is a 1917 silent film short comedy directed by Alfred Santell and starring Lloyd Hamilton, Bud Duncan and Marin Sais. It was produced by the Kalem Company and released by the General Film Company.

== Cast ==
- Lloyd Hamilton - Ham
- Bud Duncan - Bud
- Marin Sais - Manicurist
- Robert N. Bradbury - (*as R.E. Bradbury)
- Edward Clisbee -
- Jack Hoxie - (*as Hart Hoxie)

== Preservation status ==
- A copy is preserved in the Library of Congress collection.
