= Big Business (1929 film) =

1929 American short film by James W. Horne

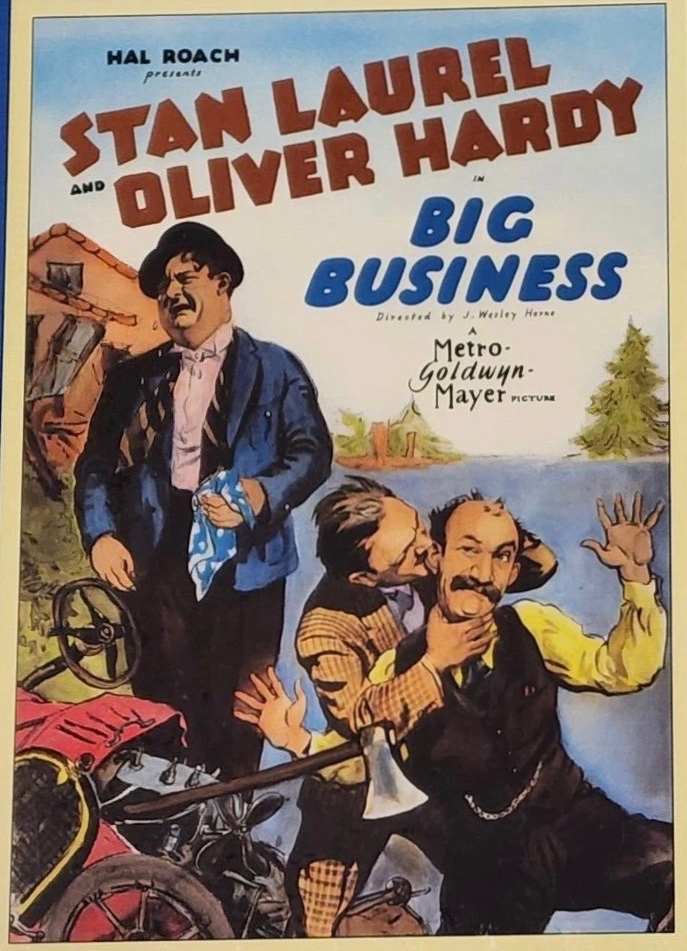
- Theatrical release poster
- Directed by: James W. Horne; Leo McCarey
- Written by: H.M. Walker (titles)
- Produced by: Hal Roach
- Starring: Stan Laurel; Oliver Hardy; James Finlayson; Tiny Sandford; Charlie Hall; Lyle Tayo
- Edited by: Richard Currier
- Production company: Hal Roach Studios
- Distributed by: Metro-Goldwyn-Mayer
- Release date: April 20, 1929
- Running time: 18:47
- Country: United States
- Languages: Silent film English (Original intertitles)

Big Business is a 1929 silent Laurel and Hardy comedy short subject directed by James W. Horne and supervised by Leo McCarey from a McCarey (uncredited) and H. M. Walker script. The film, largely about tit-for-tat vandalism between Laurel and Hardy as Christmas tree salesmen and the man who rejects them, was deemed culturally significant and selected for preservation in the National Film Registry by the Library of Congress in 1992.

== Plot ==
Big Business (1929)

Laurel and Hardy play door-to-door Christmas tree salesmen in California. They end up getting into an escalating feud with a grumpy would-be customer (James Finlayson). Goaded by their repeated attempts to sell him a Christmas tree, he destroys it with hedge-clippers. Laurel and Hardy retaliate by damaging the man's doorframe with a knife.

The man then goes to work on their clothes, and this escalates, with his home and their car being destroyed in the melee (after the homeowner has run out of Christmas trees to mangle). A police officer steps in to stop the fight (after vases are thrown out and smashed, and one hits him on the foot) and negotiates a peaceful resolution. Stan and Ollie give the homeowner a cigar as a peace offering. However, as the pair make their escape and the homeowner happily lights the gratis smoking-device, it is revealed to be a "trick" cigar rigged with a hidden powder-charge, which promptly explodes in his face.

== Cast ==
- Stan Laurel as Stan
- Oliver Hardy as Ollie
- James Finlayson as the furious Home owner
- Tiny Sandford as the Policeman
- Lyle Tayo as the first Customer
- Charlie Hall as Neighbor

== Production ==
Producer Hal Roach bought a vacant house at 10281 Dunleer Drive, Cheviot Hills, Los Angeles from a studio worker so he could destroy it in the film. According to Roach, a mistake was made regarding the address, and the cast and crew demolished the wrong house. The owners of that home happened to be away on vacation and returned just as filming was being completed. Stan Laurel later said that Roach's story was a fabrication. However, Roach, at age 100, repeated the story as factual in a 1992 televised interview conducted by guest host Jay Leno on The Tonight Show Starring Johnny Carson.

== See also ==
- List of Christmas films
