= The Social Pirates =

1916 silent film

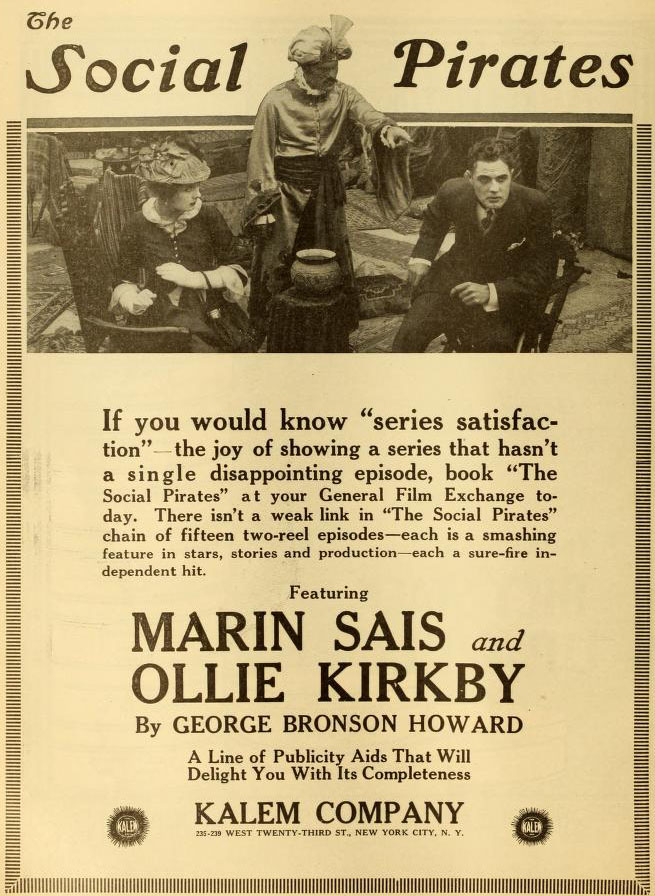
- Trade advertisement
- Directed by: James W. Horne
- Written by: George Bronson Howard
- Produced by: Kalem Company
- Starring: Marin Sais; Ollie Kirkby
- Distributed by: General Film Company
- Release date: March 27, 1916
- Running time: 15 2-reel episodes
- Country: United States
- Language: Silent (English intertitles)

The Social Pirates is a 1916 American silent film serial directed by James W. Horne. It starred Marin Sais, Ollie Kirkby and True Boardman. It was written by George Bronson Howard and produced by the Kalem Company.

== Cast ==
- Marin Sais as Mona Hartley
- Ollie Kirkby as Mary Davenport
- True Boardman as
- Frank Jonasson as King of the Nile
- Paul Hurst as Mona's Accomplice
- Jessie Arnold
- Thomas G. Lingham as James Harrasford
- Edward Clisbee
- Priscilla Dean
- Robert N. Bradbury
- Forrest Taylor
- Rupert Dell
- Barney Furey
- Ruth Snyder

== Chapter titles ==
1. The Little Monte Carlo
2. The Corsican Sisters
3. The Parasite
4. A War of Wits
5. The Millionaire Plunger
6. The Master Swindlers
7. The Rogue's Nemesis
8. Sauce for the Gander
9. The Missing Millionaire
10. Unmasking a Rascal
11. The Fangs of the Tattler
12. The Disappearance of Helen Mintern
13. In the Service of the State
14. The Music Swindlers
15. Black Magic
