= Cruise of the Jasper B =

1926 film by James W. Horne

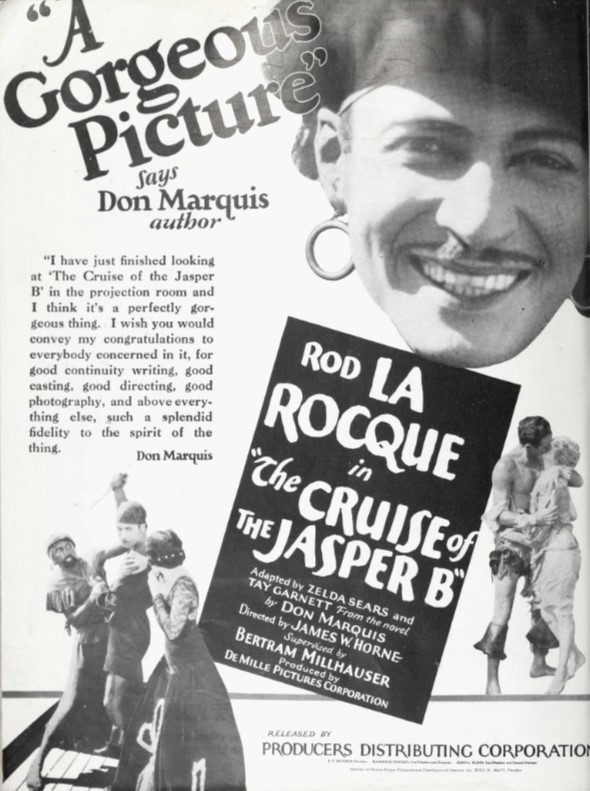
- Advertisement
- Directed by: James W. Horne
- Written by: Tay Garnett; John W. Krafft; Zelda Sears (screenplay)
- Based on: Cruise of the Jasper B by Don Marquis
- Produced by: Cecil B. DeMille
- Starring: Rod La Rocque; Mildred Harris; Snitz Edwards; Jack Ackroyd
- Distributed by: Producers Distributing Corporation
- Release date: December 13, 1926
- Running time: 60 minutes; 6 reels (5,780 feet)
- Country: United States
- Language: Silent (English intertitles)

Cruise of the Jasper B is a 1926 American silent action comedy film produced by Cecil B. DeMille and directed by James W. Horne. The film is loosely based on the 1916 novel of the same name by American poet Don Marquis, although the film adaptation and novel share little in common.

== Plot ==
The film stars actor Rod La Rocque as 'Jerry Cleggert', a good-natured descendant of an 18th-century pirate who resides aboard the rickety ship Jasper B. Cleggert is informed that in order to inherit a large inheritance, he must marry on his twenty-fifth birthday – otherwise he would relinquish all claims to his impending fortune.

Jerry soon meets his ideal would-be bride, Agatha Fairhaven (Mildred Harris), and the two immediately fall in love. Complications arise when the dastardly Reginald Maltravers (Snitz Edwards) attempts to cheat Agatha out of her inheritance.

The courting couple suffer a series of mishaps on the way to altar; they are waylaid en route by a trio of bandits, escape from a runaway taxi cab, and outrun a mob of unscrupulous state authorities.

The weary couple finally manage to wed just before the deadline on board the Jasper B and Cleggert inherits his family fortune.

== Cast ==
- Rod La Rocque as Jerry Cleggett
- Mildred Harris as Agatha Fairhaven
- Snitz Edwards as Reginald Maltravers
- Jack Ackroyd as Wiggins
- Otto Lederer as Auctioneer
- James T. Mack as Assistant Auctioneer
- Billy Engle as Little Mover
- Charlie Hall as Mover
- Fred Kelsey as Bailiff
- Tiny Sandford as Big Mover

== Preservation ==
Prints of Cruise of the Jasper B are in the collections of the Library of Congress, Archives Du Film Du CNC, UCLA Film & Television Archive, and George Eastman Museum Motion Picture Collection.

== See also ==
- Paradise for Two, a 1927 film about inheritance
- Five and Ten Cent Annie (1928); a similar themed lost movie
