= The Hellion (1924 film) =

1924 film

- Directed by: Bruce M. Mitchell
- Written by: Bruce M. Mitchell
- Produced by: Anthony J. Xydias
- Starring: J.B. Warner; Marin Sais; Aline Goodwin; Boris Karloff
- Production company: Sunset Productions
- Distributed by: Aywon Film Corporation; Sunset Pictures
- Release date: July 15, 1924
- Running time: 5 reels (50 minutes)
- Country: United States
- Languages: Silent; English intertitles

The Hellion is a 1924 American silent Western film written and directed for Sunset Productions by Bruce M. Mitchell, and featuring a young Boris Karloff. The film was also released under the title A Woman Scorned. The film's status today is unknown.

== Plot ==
Ranch hand Tex Gardy comes to the aid of the father of the girl he loves. The old man's ranch is being threatened by an outlaw gang led by a woman known only as The Hellion.

== Cast ==
- J.B. Warner as Tex Gardy
- Marin Sais as The Hellion
- William A. Berke as The Father (credited as William Lester)
- Aline Goodwin as The Daughter
- Boris Karloff as an Outlaw
