= Unprotected =

1916 American drama silent film directed by James Young

- Directed by: James Young
- Screenplay by: James Hatton
- Produced by: Jesse L. Lasky
- Starring: Blanche Sweet; Theodore Roberts; Ernest Joy; Tom Forman; Walter Long; Mrs. Lewis McCord
- Distributed by: Paramount Pictures
- Release date: November 6, 1916

Unprotected is a 1916 American drama silent film directed by James Young, written by James Hatton, and starring Blanche Sweet, Theodore Roberts, Ernest Joy, Tom Forman, Walter Long and Mrs. Lewis McCord. It was released on November 6, 1916 (US), by Paramount Pictures.

== Cast ==
- Blanche Sweet as Barbara King
- Theodore Roberts as Rufus Jamison
- Lydia Jasmin Unsworth Lola Faith Richardson
- Ernest Joy as Gov. John Carroll
- Tom Forman as Gordon Carroll
- Walter Long as Joshua Craig
- Mrs. Lewis McCord as Convict Mattie Rowe
- Robert Gray as Tony Salvarro
- Jane Wolfe as The Mulatto
