= The Golden Fetter =

- Directed by: Edward LeSaint
- Screenplay by: Charles Tenney Jackson; Charles Maigne
- Produced by: Jesse L. Lasky
- Starring: Wallace Reid; Anita King; Tully Marshall; Guy Oliver; Walter Long; Mrs. Lewis McCord
- Cinematography: Allen M. Davey
- Production company: Jesse L. Lasky Feature Play Company
- Distributed by: Paramount Pictures
- Release date: January 25, 1917
- Running time: 50 minutes
- Country: United States
- Language: English

The Golden Fetter is a 1917 American romance silent film directed by Edward LeSaint and written by Charles Tenney Jackson and Charles Maigne. The film stars Wallace Reid, Anita King, Tully Marshall, Guy Oliver, Walter Long, and Mrs. Lewis McCord. The film was released on January 25, 1917, by Paramount Pictures.A print of this film exists.

== Cast ==
- Wallace Reid as James Roger Ralston
- Anita King as Faith Miller
- Tully Marshall as Henry Slade
- Guy Oliver as Edson
- Walter Long as McGill
- Mrs. Lewis McCord as Big Annie
- Clarence Geldart as Flynn
- Lawrence Peyton as Buck Hanson
- Lucien Littlefield as Pete
