= The Big Fight (1930 film) =

1930 film

- Directed by: Walter Lang
- Written by: Max Marcin (play); Milton Herbert Gropper (play); Walter Woods (screenplay)
- Starring: Lola Lane
- Distributed by: Sono Art-World Wide Pictures
- Release date: May 11, 1930
- Running time: 65 minutes
- Country: United States
- Language: English

The Big Fight is a 1930 American pre-Code drama film starring Lola Lane, Ralph Ince, Guinn Williams and Stepin Fetchit, based upon the play by Max Marcin and Herbert Gropper, directed by Walter Lang, and released by Sono Art-World Wide Pictures.

== Cast ==
- Lola Lane as Shirley
- Ralph Ince as Chuck
- Guinn "Big Boy" Williams as Tiger (billed as Guinn Williams)
- Stepin Fetchit as Spot
- Wheeler Oakman as Steve
- James Eagles as Lester (billed as James Eagle)
- Robert Emmett O'Connor as Detective (billed as Robert E. O'Connor)
- Frank Jonasson as Berrili
