= Frank Jonasson =

American actor

- Born: December 14, 1878; Salt Lake City, Utah, US
- Died: October 17, 1942 (aged 63); Rancho Los Amigos, California, US
- Occupation: Actor
- Years active: 1914–1930

Frank Jonasson (December 14, 1878 – October 17, 1942) was an American film actor of the silent era. He appeared in 75 films between 1914 and 1930. He was born in Salt Lake City, Utah, and died in Rancho Los Amigos, California.

== Selected filmography ==
- Stingaree (1915)
- When Thieves Fall Out (1915)
- The Social Pirates (1916)
- Border Wolves (1916)
- The Man from Tia Juana (1917)
- The Trapping of Two-Bit Tuttle (1917)
- The Midnight Man (1919)
- Riders of the Law (1922)
- The Fighting Coward (1924)
- The Top of the World (1925)
- The Movies (1925)
- Old Ironsides (1926)
- Cock o' the Walk (1930)
- The Big Fight (1930)
