= The Boer War (film) =

- Directed by: George Melford
- Starring: Jane Wolfe
- Production company: Kalem Company
- Distributed by: General Film Company
- Release date: 1914
- Running time: 5 reels
- Country: United States

The Boer War is a 1914 film, directed by George Melford about the Second Boer War.

== Cast ==
- Edward Clisbee as General Lambert, retired
- Jane Wolfe as Mrs. Lambert
- Marin Sais as Jane Lambert, their daughter
- William Brunton as Lt. Jack Lambert, their son
- Lawrence Peyton as Captain Doane
- William H. West as Jaubert, a Boer general
