= The Moth and the Star =

Fable by James Thurber

"The Moth and the Star" is a fable by James Thurber, printed in the story collection Fables for Our Time in 1940. In the fable, a young moth aspires to fly up to a star, and keeps trying to reach that impossible goal. The other moths laugh at him. They tell him he should have a realistic goal, such as flying to a candle. Indeed, they all fly to candles and are burnt to ashes. The dreamy, unrealistic young moth keeps focused on flying to a star. He lives a long and happy life.
