= Paradise for Two (1927 film) =

1927 film

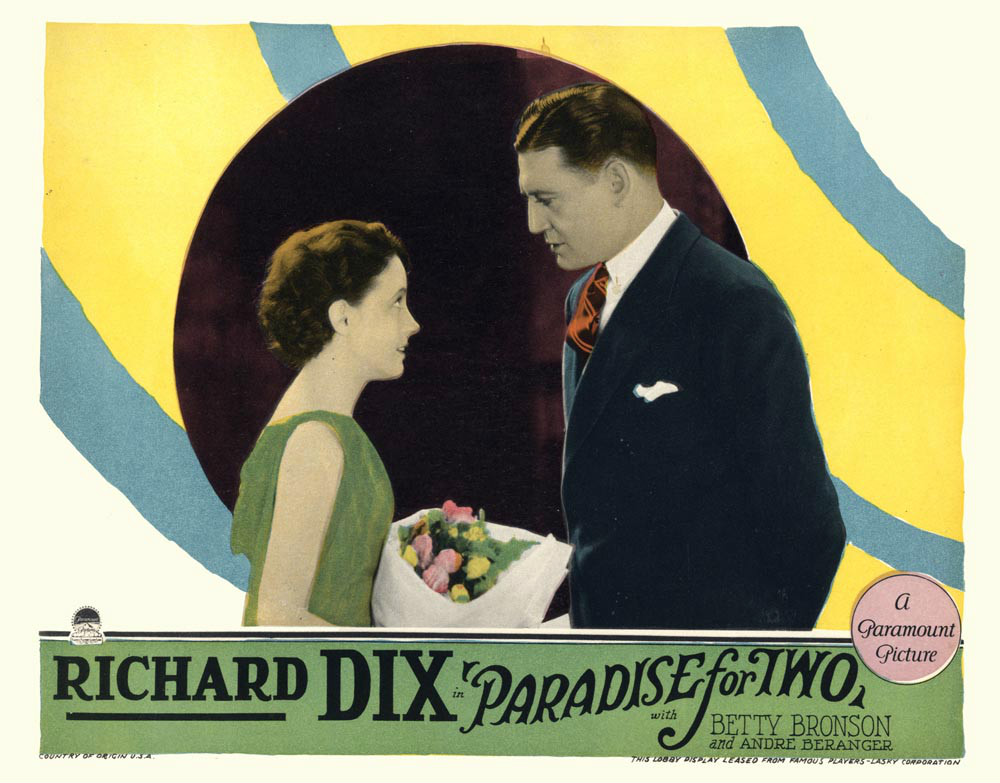
- Lobby card
- Directed by: Gregory La Cava
- Written by: Howard Emmett Rogers (screen story); Ray Harris (adaptation); Thomas J. Crizer (adaptation); J. Clarkson Miller (scenario)
- Produced by: Adolph Zukor; Jesse Lasky; William LeBaron
- Starring: Richard Dix; Betty Bronson; Edmund Breese
- Cinematography: Edward Cronjager
- Distributed by: Paramount Pictures
- Release date: January 23, 1927
- Running time: 70 minutes; 7 reels (6,187 feet)
- Country: United States
- Language: Silent (English intertitles)

Paradise for Two is a 1927 American silent romantic comedy film produced by Famous Players–Lasky and distributed by Paramount Pictures. It was directed by Gregory La Cava and starred Richard Dix and Betty Bronson. Bronson had starred in a similarly titled film over at First National Pictures the previous year called Paradise.

== Cast ==
- Richard Dix as Steve Porter
- Betty Bronson as Sally Lane
- Edmund Breese as Uncle Howard
- George Beranger as Maurice
- Dorothy Appleby as young girl (uncredited)

== Preservation ==
With no prints of Paradise for Two located in any film archives, it is a lost film.

== See also ==
- Cruise of the Jasper B, an existing similar themed film about inheritance
