= Stingaree (serial) =

1915 film

- Directed by: James W. Horne
- Written by: James W. Horne; E. W. Hornung
- Produced by: James W. Horne
- Starring: True Boardman
- Release date: November 24, 1915
- Running time: 240 minutes
- Country: United States
- Language: Silent with English intertitles

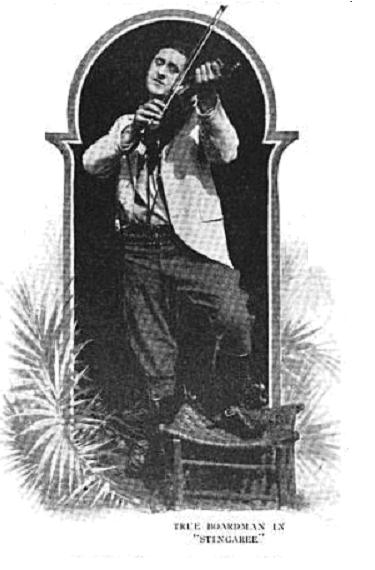
True Boardman as Stingaree

Stingaree is a 1915 American drama film serial, set in Australia, directed by James W. Horne. It was followed by a sequel The Further Adventures of Stingaree.

== Episodes ==
1. An Enemy of Mankind (1915)
2. A Voice in the Wilderness (1915)
3. The Black Hole of Glenrenald (1915)
4. To the Vile Dust (1915)
5. A Bushranger at Bay (1915)
6. The Taking of Stingaree (1915)
7. The Honor of the Road (1916)
8. The Purification of Mulfers (1916)
9. The Duel in the Desert (1916)
10. The Villain Worshipper (1916)
11. The Moth and the Star (1916)
12. The Darkest Hour (1916)

== Cast ==
- True Boardman as Irving Randolph / Stingaree
- Marin Sais as Ethel Porter
- Paul Hurst as Howie (as Paul C. Hurst)
- Thomas G. Lingham as Guy Kentish
- Frank Jonasson as Inspector Kilbride / Vanheimert / Governor / Bishop Methuen
- William Brunton as Robert randolph
- James W. Horne as Oswald
- Ollie Kirby as Mrs. Green (as Ollie Kirkby)
- Edward Clisbee as Sergeant Cameron / Chaplain / John Trent / Trooper Bowen
- Joseph Barber as Inspector
- Jack Lott
- Hoot Gibson
- Janet Rambeau
