= James W. Horne =

American actor, screenwriter, and film director (1881–1942)

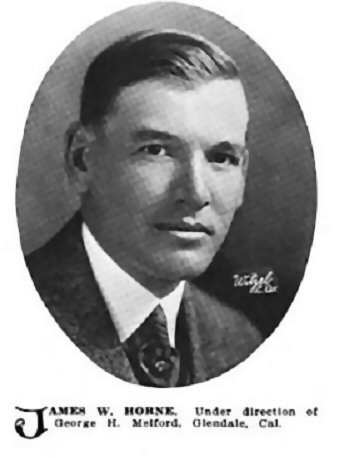
- Horne in Who's Who in the Film World, 1914
- Born: James Wesley Horne; December 14, 1881; San Francisco, California, U.S.
- Died: June 29, 1942 (aged 60); Los Angeles, California, U.S.
- Resting place: Forest Lawn Memorial Park (Glendale)
- Occupations: Film director; actor; screenwriter
- Years active: 1915-1942
- Spouse: Cleo Ridgely (m. 1916)

James Wesley Horne (December 14, 1881 – June 29, 1942) was an American actor, screenwriter, and film director.

Horne was among the most talented American directors of serials during years encompassing World War I, a period in which these cinematic "chapter plays" were both critically acclaimed and lucrative.

== Silent era ==
James Horne began his career as an actor under director Sidney Olcott at Kalem Studios in 1913 and directed his first film for the company two years later. He then specialized in multi-chapter serials.

Biographer Richard Koszarski ranks James Horne among “the most important American serial directors” during the heyday of serial production of the early to late teens. Horne’s The Mysteries of the Grand Hotel (1915) is among his most outstanding works in this genre. His other notable serials include Girl Detective (1915), Stingaree (1915), and The Social Pirates (1916).

Regarding speed and efficiency as a virtue in delivering quality films, Horne wrote “everyone works better under a bit of speed pressure than when taking one’s time.”

Kalem discontinued operations in 1917 when it was sold to the Vitagraph company. Horne remained in the serial field, signing with Universal Pictures late that year. Horne specialized in staging thrill scenes for features and serials. On the strength of Horne's work in Cruise of the Jasper B, Buster Keaton hired him to direct Keaton's 1927 comedy College. Unfortunately, Keaton ended up very dissatisfied with Horne. As the film's co-star Harold Goodwin later said: "Jimmy Horne--he was probably one of the worst directors in the business, but Buster had him standing by to direct scenes that didn't mean much. Buster directed most of the show."

On his debt to the director D. W. Griffith Horne wrote: “Mr. Griffith’s great success has been in the simplicity, the reality, of his stories. Real human existence is in every one of his pictures. He is my master, and I am not ashamed to say I that I would imitate him as much as possible.”

== Comedy career ==
“I feel the cameraman must be given equal credit with the director in any production. He can make or break the feature. While the director is watching the action, the cameraman has a hundred technical details to observe.” —Director James Horne in Photoplay magazine, February 1916.

Horne's collaboration with Keaton now established him as a comedy director. He signed with the all-comedy Hal Roach studio, where he worked with Roach's leading stars, Laurel and Hardy, Charley Chase, and Our Gang. Horne's Laurel and Hardy comedies Big Business (credited to "J. Wesley Horne") and Way Out West are acclaimed as classics. Horne did appear as an actor in a Roach comedy, playing a bandit chief in Beau Hunks; the scheduled actor failed to appear, and Horne stepped into the costume to continue the filming.

When talking pictures arrived, Horne displayed an aptitude for directing Roach's foreign-language versions; the American version might be staged by James Parrott, for example, but the international version would be entrusted to Horne.

Horne left Roach in 1932 during an economic downturn that eliminated many jobs. He returned to Universal and directed the studio's now-obscure two-reel comedies for the next two years. When Universal closed its comedy unit, Horne worked briefly at Columbia Pictures and went back to Roach in 1935.

== Return to serials ==
In 1937 Columbia, noting the popularity of serials, decided to enter the field. At first the studio found it easier to release the independent productions of the Weiss Bros. "Adventure Serials", but by 1938 Columbia wanted to produce serials with its own actors, technicians, and facilities. Former serial specialist James Horne co-directed The Spider's Web, starring Warren Hull as a masked crimefighter. Today it is regarded as Columbia's best serial; when first released, it was the most popular serial of 1938. It surpassed such well-received serials as Buck Rogers and Dick Tracy Returns by a wide margin, according to a tally published in The Motion Picture Herald and The Film Daily.

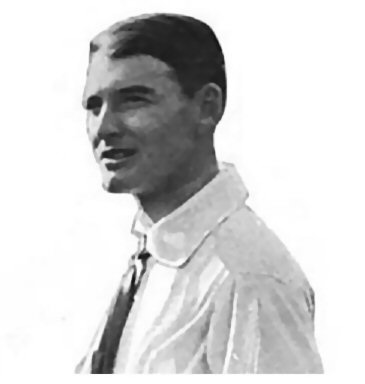
James W. Horne Photoplay (Dec. 1915)

This solidified Horne's position in Columbia's serial squad, and he directed Columbia cliffhangers exclusively for the rest of his life. His first two Columbia serials, directed in partnership with action specialist Ray Taylor, were straightforward adventure stories. When Taylor rejoined Universal, Horne was assigned to producer Larry Darmour, who left Horne in complete charge of Columbia serials.

Horne, now able to experiment with the usual serial format, freely indulged his sense of humor. He had his actors play their roles straight for the first three chapters; these would be the sample episodes used to sell the serial to exhibitors. Then, starting with Chapter 4, Horne would stray farther and farther from the straight melodramatic path, encouraging his actors to exaggerate with overly dramatic readings, and staging larger-than-life fight scenes.

James Horne's reputation as a serial director was sealed with the 1970 rediscovery of Holt of the Secret Service. This 1941 serial had just entered the public domain and thus was among the first Columbia serials in decades to be available for reappraisal. Latter-day serial fans and authors marveled at Horne's devil-may-care style, with tongue-in-cheek dialogue, quietly comic incongruities in the background, and six-against-one brawls photographed slightly faster than normal. As author Alan G. Barbour observed, "[Horne's serials] set serial fans' funny bones in motion with their ludicrous sight gags and ridiculous situations (i.e., gangsters playing jacks, hanging out their laundry, wearing silly party hats, etc.)." Film historian William K. Everson defended Horne's approach: "Serial purists understandably resented this and have never liked Horne's serials. Yet he was too good a director, too much a past master of silent and sound comedy not to know precisely what he was doing... Playing them for comedy didn't make them better, but it did keep them lively, distinctive, and different." Horne did keep the thrill scenes serious enough to satisfy action fans, and many of his cliffhanging perils are staged very effectively. But the overall tone of Horne's serials is mock-serious, with Knox Manning's urgent narration recapping the action (the 1960s Batman TV series copied Horne's style). The Green Archer, which Horne co-wrote as well as directed, is probably the most satirically enjoyable of Horne's serials.

The death of Horne's producer Larry Darmour in March 1942 presaged the end of Columbia's irreverent serials. Horne himself died three months later on June 29, 1942, of a cerebral hemorrhage following a stroke. He was interred in the Forest Lawn Memorial Park Cemetery in Glendale, California.

Horne was featured briefly in the 2018 Laurel and Hardy biopic Stan & Ollie, depicted directing Way Out West, portrayed by Joseph Balderrama.

== Selected filmography ==
=== Director ===
- The Vivisectionist (1915)
- Dangerous Pastime (1922)
- Blow Your Own Horn (1923)
- Can a Woman Love Twice? (1923)
- Itching Palms (1923)
- In Fast Company (1924)
- Laughing at Danger (1924)
- Stepping Lively (1924)
- Alimony (1924)
- Youth and Adventure (1925)
- The Cruise of the Jasper B (1926)
- Scared Stiff (1926, short)
- College (1927) (with Buster Keaton)
- The Big Hop (1928)
- Black Butterflies (1928)
- Big Business (1929) (with Laurel and Hardy)
- High C's (1930) (with Charley Chase)
- When the Wind Blows (1930) (with Our Gang)
- Beau Hunks (1931) (with Laurel and Hardy)
- I'm a Father (1935) (with Andy Clyde)
- Bonnie Scotland (1935) (with Laurel and Hardy)
- Way Out West (1937) (with Laurel and Hardy)
- All Over Town (1937) (with Olsen and Johnson)
- The Spider's Web (1938) (serial, with Warren Hull; co-directed with Ray Taylor)
- The Shadow (1940) (serial, with Victor Jory)
- White Eagle (1941) (serial, with Buck Jones)
- Holt of the Secret Service (1941) (serial, with Jack Holt)
- Perils of the Royal Mounted (1942) (serial, with Robert Kellard; Horne's last film)

=== Actor ===
- The Invisible Power (1914) - Piano Player
- The Pitfall (1915) - Jack Green - Westcott's Secretary
- Stingaree (1915, Serial) - Oswald
- Beau Hunks (1931) - Chief of the Riff-Raff
