= Stan Laurel filmography =

This is a list of films of Stan Laurel, as an actor without Oliver Hardy. For the filmography of Laurel and Hardy as a team, see Laurel and Hardy filmography.

Stan Laurel (/ˈlɒrəl/ LORR-əl; born Arthur Stanley Jefferson; 16 June 1890 – 23 February 1965) was an English comic actor, writer, and film director who was one half of the comedy duo Laurel and Hardy. He appeared with his comedy partner Oliver Hardy in 107 short films, feature films, and cameo roles.

== List ==
Year	Film	Role	Director	Notes
1917	Nuts in May	Mental Patient (as Stan Jefferson)	Robin Williamson	Short; as Stan Jefferson
1918	Hickory Hiram	Hiram	Edwin Frazee	Short
1918	Whose Zoo?	Stanley (as Stanley Laurel)	Craig Hutchinson	Short; as Stanley Laurel
1918	Phoney Photos	Swift	Edwin Frazee	Short
1918	Huns and Hyphens	Gang member	Larry Semon	Short
1918	No Place Like Jail	Convict	Frank Terry	Short
1918	Bears and Bad Men	Pete	Larry Semon	Short
1918	Just Rambling Along	Nervy Young Man	Hal Roach	Short
1918	Frauds and Frenzies	Simp, Second Prisoner	Larry Semon	Short
1918	O, It's Great to Be Crazy	Sam Squirrel (as Stanley Laurel)	Leslie T. Peacocke	Short; as Stanley Laurel
1919	Do You Love Your Wife?	Toby - the janitor	Hal Roach	Short
1919	Hustling for Health	The Man	Frank Terry	Short
1919	Hoot Mon!		Hal Roach	Short
1922	The Egg	Humpty Dumpty	Gilbert Pratt	Short
1922	The Weak-End Party	The Gardener	Broncho Billy Anderson	Short
1922	Mud and Sand	Rhubarb Vaselino	Gilbert Pratt	Short
1922	The Pest	Jimmy Smith	Broncho Billy Anderson	Short
1922	Mixed Nuts	Book salesman	James Parrott / Robin Williamson (uncredited)	Short
1923	When Knights Were Cold	Lord Helpus, a Slippery Knight	Frank Fouce	Short
1923	The Handy Man	The handy man	Robert P. Kerr	Short
1923	The Noon Whistle	Tanglefoot	George Jeske	Short
1923	White Wings	Street cleaner	George Jeske	Short
1923	Under Two Jags	The Stranger	George Jeske	Short
1923	Pick and Shovel	Miner	George Jeske	Short
1923	Collars and Cuffs	Laundry worker	George Jeske	Short
1923	Kill or Cure	Door to door salesman	Scott Pembroke	Short
1923	Gas and Air	Phillup McCann	Scott Pembroke	Short
1923	Oranges and Lemons	Sunkist	George Jeske	Short
1923	Short Orders	Waiter	Hal Roach	Short
1923	A Man About Town	A Man About Town	George Jeske	Short
1923	Roughest Africa	Prof. Stanislaus Laurello (Big Boss)	Ralph Ceder	Short; Big Boss
1923	Frozen Hearts	Olaf - A Peasant	J. A. Howe	Short
1923	The Whole Truth	The husband	Ralph Ceder	Short
1923	Save the Ship	Husband	Hal Roach	Short
1923	The Soilers	Bob Canister	Ralph Ceder	Short
1923	Scorching Sands	Stan	Hal Roach / Robin Williamson	Short
1923	Mother's Joy	Magnus Dippytack / Basil Dippytack, his son	Ralph Ceder	Short
1924	Smithy	Smithy	Hal Roach	Short
1924	Postage Due	Stan	George Jeske	Short
1924	Zeb vs. Paprika	Dippy Donawho	Ralph Ceder	Short
1924	Brothers Under the Chin		Ralph Ceder	Short
1924	Near Dublin	Con	Ralph Ceder	Short
1924	Rupert of Hee Haw	The King / Rudolph Razz	Scott Pembroke	Short
1924	Wide Open Spaces	Gabriel Goober	George Jeske	Short
1924	Short Kilts	McPherson's Son	George Jeske	Short
1924	Mandarin Mix-Up	Sum Sap	Scott Pembroke	Short
1924	Detained	A Convict	Joe Rock	Short
1924	Monsieur Don't Care	Rhubarb Vaselino	Joe Rock	Short
1924	West of Hot Dog	Stan, a tenderfoot	Joe Rock	Short
1925	Somewhere in Wrong	A tramp	Joe Rock	Short
1925	Twins	Stan / his twin	Joe Rock	Short
1925	Pie-Eyed	Drunk	Joe Rock	Short
1925	The Snow Hawk	Mountie	Joe Rock	Short
1925	Navy Blue Days	Stan	Joe Rock	Short
1925	The Sleuth	Webster Dingle	Harry Sweet	Short
1925	Dr. Pyckle and Mr. Pryde	Dr. Pyckle / Mr. Pryde	Joe Rock	Short
1925	Half a Man	Winchell McSweeney	Harry Sweet	Short
1926	What's the World Coming To?	The Man in the Window (uncredited)		Short; uncredited
1926	Get 'Em Young	Summers, the butler	Stan Laurel	Short
1926	On the Front Page	Dangerfield	James Parrott	Short
1926	Wife Tamers		James W. Horne	Short
1927	Seeing the World	English pedestrian	Robert F. McGowan	Short
1927	Eve's Love Letters	Anatole, the butler	Leo McCarey	Short
1928	Should Tall Men Marry?	Texas Tommy	Louis J. Gasnier	Short, Final Solo Film Role
