= George Rowe (actor) =

American actor (1894–1975)

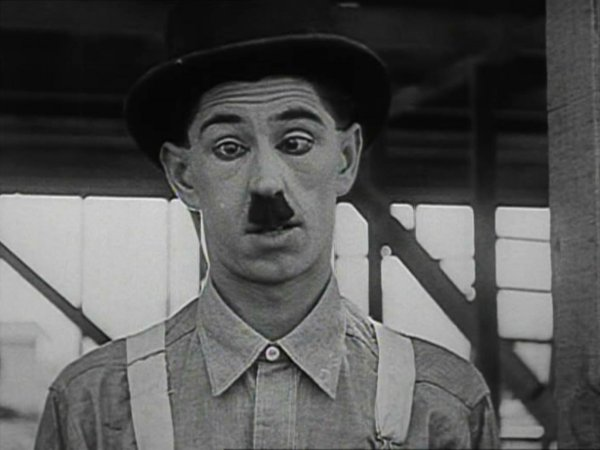
- Rowe in Smithy (1924)
- Born: George Dewey Thompson Rowe; September 15, 1894; Maine, U.S.
- Died: February 5, 1975 (aged 80); Santa Barbara, California, U.S.
- Occupation: Actor
- Years active: 1919–1928
- Spouse: Wanda Lorraine Rowe (m. 1919)

George Dewey Thompson Rowe (September 15, 1894 – February 5, 1975) was an American character actor of the silent film era, known for his cross-eyed look. Born in Maine on September 15, 1894, Rowe broke into the film industry in the 1919 short film, Tough Luck, starring Snub Pollard. Over his ten-year career, he appeared in over 125 shorts, many of which for Hal Roach, including several with Stan Laurel and in the iconic Our Gang series. His Roach Studio contract was terminated in 1925, after which he toured the West Coast in vaudeville for a time. Rowe's film career ended with the advent of sound film.

In February 1919, Rowe was married to Wanda Lorraine Rowe. Rowe died on February 5, 1975, in Santa Barbara, California, at the age of 80, and was interred at the Santa Barbara Cemetery. His widow died on April 26, 1983, at the age of 90 and was interred at the same cemetery alongside him.

== Select filmography ==
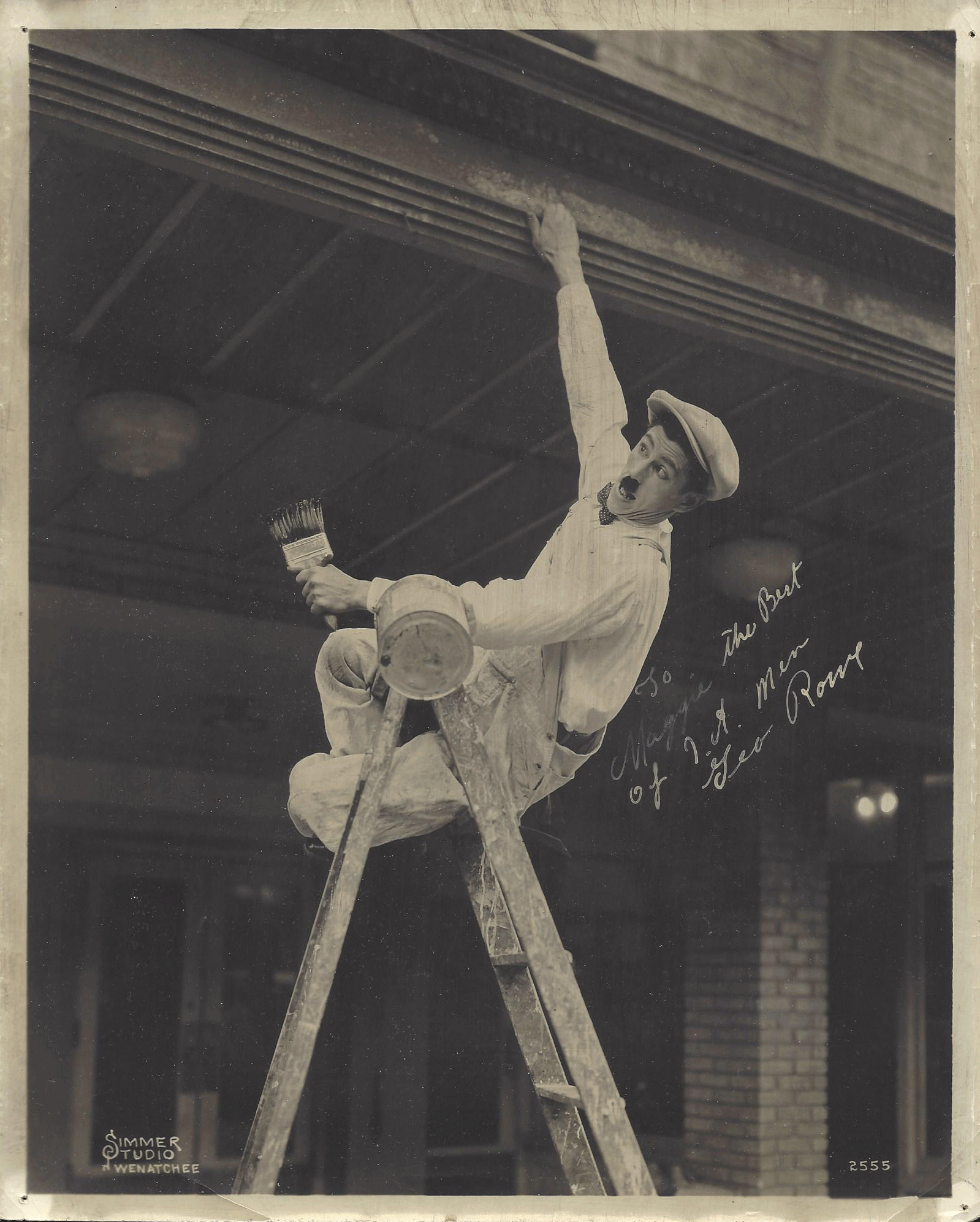
Vaudeville Publicity Photo

Stan Laurel Starring Films:

- Wide Open Spaces (1924)
- Near Dublin (1924)
- Postage Due (1924)
- Rupert of Hee Haw (1924)
- Brothers Under the Chin (1924)
- Smithy (1924)
- Zeb vs. Paprika (1924)
- Short Kilts (1924)
- Oranges and Lemons (1923)
- A Man About Town (1923)
- White Wings (1923)
- Under Two Jags (1923)
- Kill or Cure (1923)
- Scorching Sands (1923)
- Pick and Shovel (1923)
- Collars and Cuffs (1923)
- The Soilers (1923)
- Frozen Hearts (1923)
- Mother's Joy (1923)
- Short Orders (1923)

Other Films:

- Two Tars (1928)
- You're Darn Tootin' (1928)
- Official Officers (1925)
- Fire Fighters (1922)
- Young Sherlocks (1922)
- Day Dreams (1922)
- Grandma's Boy (1922)
- Never Weaken (1921)
