= White Wings =

White Wings may refer to:

- White Wings (1923 film), an American silent short comedy film
- White Wings (1943 film), a French drama film
- White Wings Tebeau, American baseball player
- White Wings Hanau, a basketball club based in Hanau, Germany
- Rio Grande Valley WhiteWings, a baseball team based in Harlingen, Texas

== See also ==
- White Wing (disambiguation)
- Whitewing (disambiguation)
