= What's the World Coming To? =

1926 film

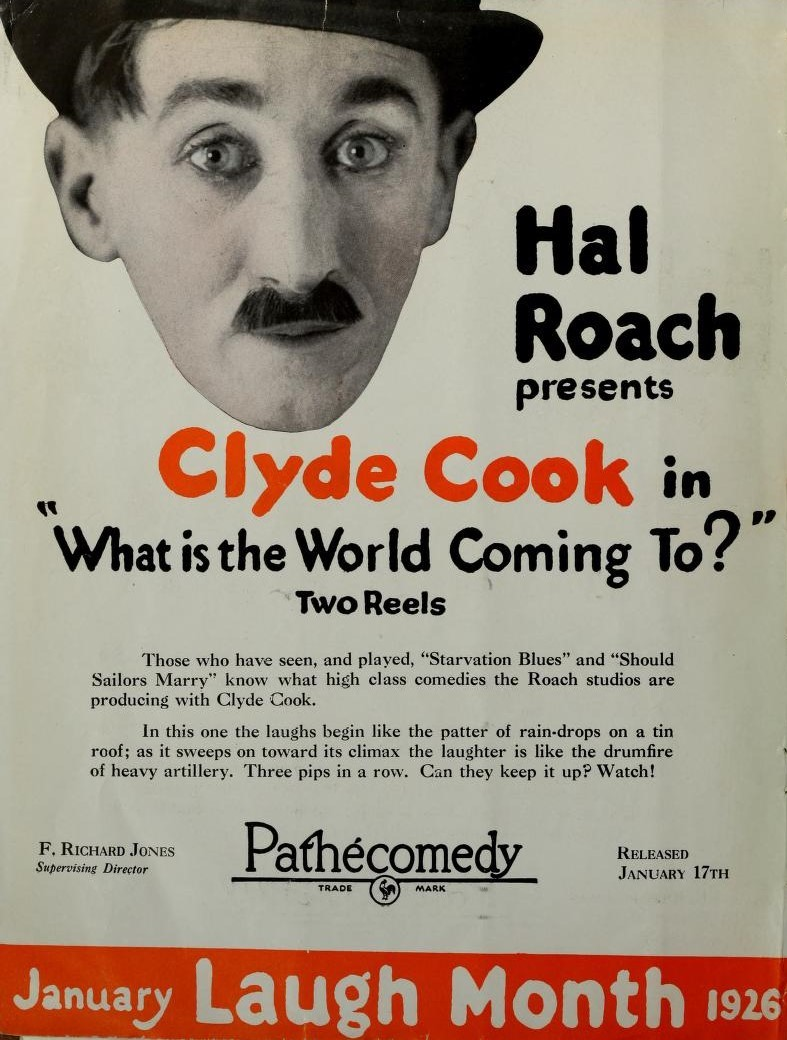
- Advertisement
- Directed by: Richard Wallace
- Written by: Stan Laurel; Frank Terry; Hal Yates
- Produced by: Hal Roach
- Starring: Clyde Cook
- Cinematography: Glen Carrier
- Production company: Hal Roach Studios
- Distributed by: Pathé Exchange
- Release date: January 17, 1926
- Running time: 2 reels
- Country: United States
- Language: Silent (English intertitles)

What's the World Coming To? is a 1926 American silent comedy film directed by Richard Wallace and starring Clyde Cook. The film's working title was Furious Future. A restoration of the film was completed in September 2015 as a collaboration between Carleton University, New York University, and the San Francisco Silent Film Festival.

== Plot ==
What's the World Coming To? (1926)

Set 100 years in the future, women dominate society and men are the "weaker" sex, assuming the stereotypical roles of pampered women. A stay-at-home husband of a well-off successful businesswoman, Billie, is cheating on her. Another dominant woman tries to seduce Cook, but a ruckus breaks out when Billie returns home and finds the two flirting.

== Cast ==
- Clyde Cook as Claudia Catwalloper, the Blushing Groom / The Baby
- Katherine Grant as Billie, the Bride
- James Finlayson as The Groom’s Father
- Laura De Cardi as Lieutenant Penelope, the Villain
- Martha Sleeper as The Butler
- Helen Gilmore as A neighbor (uncredited)
- Frank Terry as Man in window (uncredited)

== See also ==
- List of American films of 1926
- Stan Laurel filmography
