= Katherine Grant (actress) =

American actress

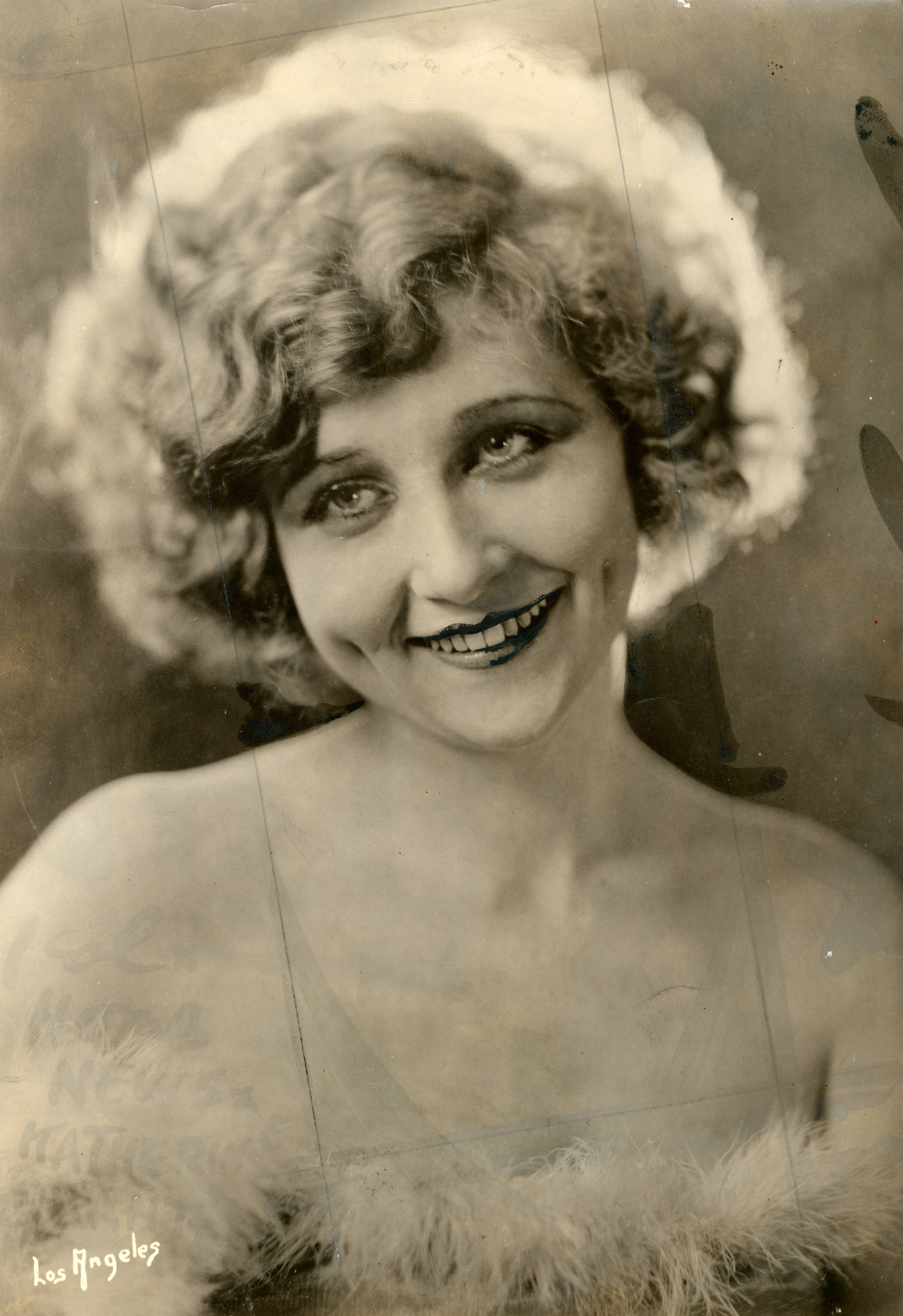
- Born: Katherine May Grant; 1 May 1904; Los Angeles, California, U.S.
- Died: 2 April 1937 (aged 32); San Bernardino County, California, U.S.
- Resting place: Evergreen Cemetery, Los Angeles, California, U.S.
- Years active: 1922–1926

Katherine Grant (May 1, 1904 – April 2, 1937) was an American actress.

== Early life and career ==
Born in Los Angeles, California on May 1, 1904, Grant was the second child of John Edward Grant and Anita May Whiteman. Her father was born in Hulme, Lancashire, England, in 1877, and his family emigrated to the U.S. in the early 1880s. He met Pennsylvania-born Anita Whiteman, born in 1878, in Los Angeles, and they married on April 20, 1900. They had their first child, a son named Chester Lonzelle Grant on August 23, 1901.

John Grant was a carpenter, and tried his hand at some other trades. His ever-changing employment caused instability in his family's life. He and Anita divorced in 1919, and he moved to San Francisco with 18-year-old son Chester. Grant continued living in Los Angeles with her mother (who remarried in 1920 to Frederick W. Kerr, a construction worker). John died September 14, 1921, age 43. His occupation at the time of his death was automobile salesman.

Soon after turning 18 in 1922, encouraged by her mother, Grant entered and won the "Miss Los Angeles Beauty Contest". She was offered a contract by Hal Roach, and began her movie career, appearing in small roles in several Our Gang comedies.

As "Miss Los Angeles", Grant entered the Miss America contest in Atlantic City, New Jersey.

A few months earlier she was hired by a woman, an agent for a photography studio, to pose for a series of photos, described as an "art study", to be used by a sculptor who was creating a fountain. The photos, which featured Grant in artfully nude poses, were taken before she entered the "Miss Los Angeles" contest.

When Grant was in Atlantic City for the "Miss America" contest, she saw copies of the photos she believed were made solely for use by the sculptor. She was determined to cease their distribution. However, before she saw the photos, she was offered a twelve-week contract to appear as a dancer at a New York resort. She fulfilled her contractual obligation, then returned home in December.

Upon her return to Los Angeles, she went to the photography studio and appealed to the two photographers to stop the sale of the photos, but they showed her a release form she had signed, "consenting to the publication and sale of photos taken July 9, 1922." At the time she signed it, she assumed the paper was a receipt for the payment she was paid for posing.

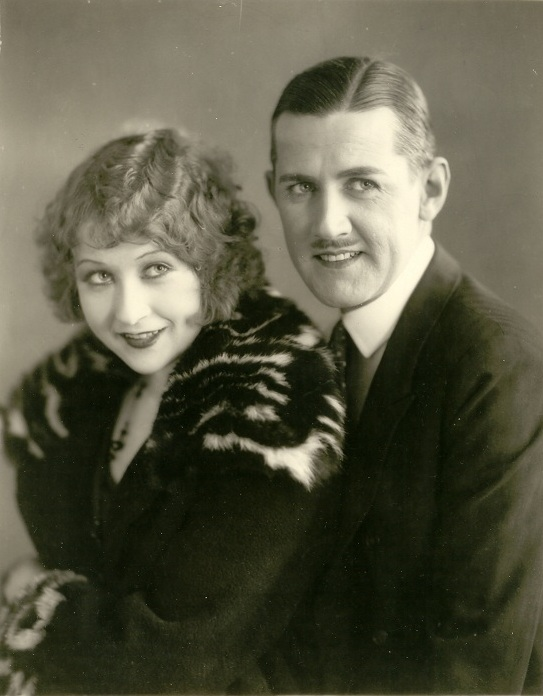
Katherine Grant and Charley Chase in publicity photo.

Soon after, Grant was called on the phone by a third man who demanded "an extortionate fee for the return of the plates" to her; otherwise, he threatened "to cause motion-picture producer Hal Roach to break the cinema contract" with her.

The distributor of the photographs, S.H. Wershon, who had a store on Sunset Boulevard, claimed the third man was acting without any authority from him or permission from the two photographers who supplied him with the prints. Wershon described the man as a former movie extra who saw Grant's pictures in his store, and recognized her as a girl he had seen on a local movie lot. He said the man approached him and suggested the photos could be used in a blackmail plot, but he wanted no part of it, and chased the man away.

Grant's attorney, Thomas Lipps, sought a warrant charging fraud against the photographers and attempted extortion against the former movie extra man. She admitted she made a mistake not reading the paper she signed, thinking it was a receipt, but that she trusted the woman who hired her, as well as the photographers, and never thought they would turn against her. She further said since she was a little girl she had "been taught the precept of 'Art for Art's sake,' and thought nothing of posing for the sculptor," but greatly objected to having her pictures obtained through fraud and circulated against her wishes. She was confident the authorities would help her in her case.

There were no follow-up articles pertaining to the outcome of the case. It can be assumed that it was favorable for Grant, because she continued with her movie career, appearing in many movies for Hal Roach over the next couple of years.

== Illness and death ==
In December 1925, Grant was the victim of a hit-and-run accident. Because "she was found to be suffering much more severely than her slight bruises would seem to warrant" she was treated in Hollywood Hospital for a while before going to a friend's home for an extended rest. During the interval of rest, the studio released her from her contract.

In May 1926, it was discovered Grant was in a sanatorium, under the assumed name of Ruth Woods to avoid publicity, in the care of a doctor who attributed her condition directly to the accident. Dr. Victor Parkin, a psychiatrist, said she suffered shock from the accident, and after several months, the shock launched her into a nervous and physical breakdown. He decreed that a prolonged period of "absolute quiet and rest were imperative or the girl's life was in danger." It was Hal Roach's suggestion she be taken to a sanatorium "where she could have complete rest...and not be accessible to even close friends, who, well meaning enough, might hurt her chances for recovery." The Roach Studios paid for all the expenses.

Hal Roach had only praise for Grant as an actress, saying she was "one of the most avid students of film technique" from the time he signed her to a five-year contract two years prior. He continued: "She screened perfectly, and in my opinion developed into the most proficient actress in the profession. We had grown to expect great things of her and for her until this happened."

Grant's mother, Mrs. Anita Grant Kerr, had her own comments to interject about her daughter's condition. "Some of the things that have been said about her are breaking my heart. She's just a sick child, there's no mystery at all about her illness." She went on to say, "Katherine worked hard in pictures, and then she was hurt in the accident. She finished two pictures after that, but it was too much. She had been dieting and not eating right, to keep her weight down, and all of those things were just too much." Mrs. Kerr soon after would take Grant home, and Dr. Parkin would continue to care for her.

Eventually, Grant's condition worsened, and she required complete care, something her mother could no longer provide. She was admitted to the Patton State Hospital in San Bernardino County, where she lived for the rest of her life. She died, as Katherine Kerr, April 2, 1937, age 32. Referencing her death certificate, the principal cause of death was pulmonary tuberculosis, with a contributing cause given as dementia praecox psychosis.

On April 5, following a funeral service at the W.A. Brown Mortuary in Los Angeles, she was buried in the Evergreen Cemetery. Her grave is located in Section E, Lot Resub 120. In August 2016 a headstone was placed on her grave by Jessica Wahl who runs a blog dedicated to silent film stars.

Grant was mentioned in the January 1929 issue of Photoplay magazine. The article, "Diet - The Menace of Hollywood" by Katherine Albert, stated "The Miss Los Angeles of a few years ago was Kathryn [sic] Grant. A film career was assured when she was given a long term contract with the Hal Roach Studio. Pretty, talented---but overweight. She must lose. The pounds HAD to come off. She went on a diet so strenuous she collapsed and was rushed to a sanitarium. Today you do not see her on the screen. Hollywood has forgotten her. She has dropped out completely from the film world."

== Partial filmography ==
- Saturday Morning (1922)
- The Cobbler (1923)
- The Noon Whistle (1923)
- White Wings (1923)
- Under Two Jags (1923)
- Pick and Shovel (1923)
- Collar and Cuffs (1923)
- Kill or Cure (1923)
- Gas and Air (1923)
- Oranges And Lemons (1923)
- A Man About Town (1923)
- Roughest Africa (1923)
- The Soilers (1923)
- Scorching Sands (1923)
- Frozen Hearts (1923)
- Seeing Nellie Home (1924)
- Why Men Work (1924)
- Sheiks in Bagdad (1925)
- Isn't Life Terrible? (1925)
- Ridin' Thunder (1925)
- His Wooden Wedding (1925)
- What's the World Coming To? (1926)
