= Mixed nuts (disambiguation) =

Mixed nuts are a snack food.

Mixed Nuts may also refer to

- Mixed Nuts (1994), American comedy film
- Mixed Nuts (1922 film), a Laurel and Hardy comedy short
- "Mixed Nuts" (song)
