= On the Front Page =

1926 film

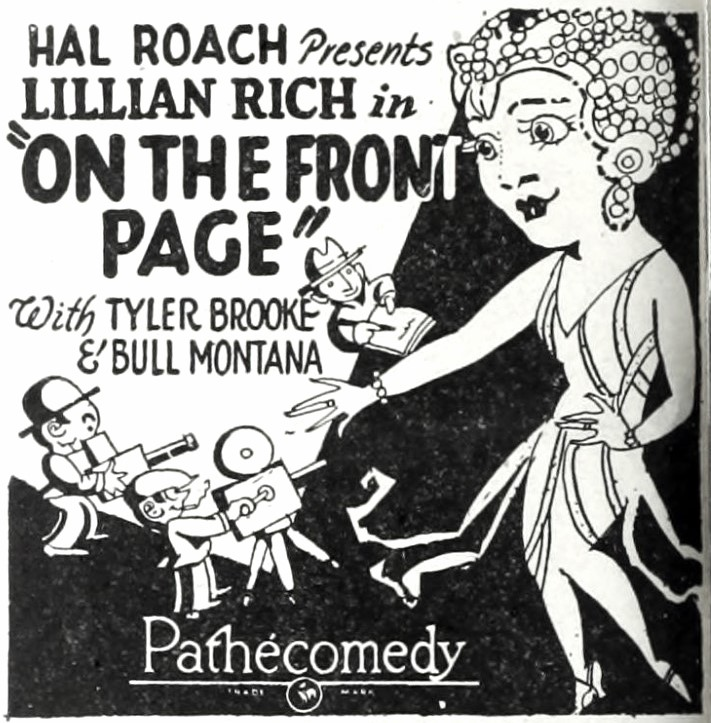
- Cornerblock advertisement for use in newspaper columns
- Directed by: James Parrott
- Written by: Stan Laurel; James Parrott
- Produced by: Hal Roach
- Starring: Lillian Rich; Stan Laurel
- Cinematography: Frank Young
- Production company: Hal Roach Studios
- Distributed by: Pathecomedy
- Release date: November 28, 1926
- Running time: 22 minutes
- Country: United States
- Language: Silent (English intertitles)

On the Front Page is a 1926 American comedy film directed by James Parrott and starring Lillian Rich and Stan Laurel.

== Plot ==
After being beaten to a scandalous story involving Countess Polasky (Rich), newspaper editor James W. Hornby (Davis) assigns his son (Brooke) 24 hours to find an even more scandalous story about the countess. The countess lounges with her two male beauty experts, both fawning over her. Her secretary (Montana) pulls them off. Hornby Jr drives fast through the outskirts of Los Angeles and is pursued by a motorcycle cop. Hornby Jr throws various items of female clothing from the car, each hitting the cop in the face as he tries to catch up.

The butler (Laurel) is sleeping when a small rock is thrown through the window by Hornby Jr. He asks if his father is up. Hornby Sr is in the bathroom. He throws a stool out of the window almost hitting his son. Jr gets the butler to throw down some fresh clothes. He starts to change next to his car but bumps it making it roll off. It gets faster and faster. Just after Jr manages to get in it rear ends the motorcycle cop launching him upwards. The cop lands in the back seat.

Hornby Sr asks if assistant if there is any progress on the story. Jr has returned to his father's mansion. The butler asks if he would like his "evening weed". Jr jumps up with an idea: the butler should put the countess in a compromising situation, and then they will be photographed and the photo published.

The butler says that women scare him. Jr forces him to wear his father's dinner suit. Father returns. They avoid being seen and Jr puts the butler in the back seat of his father's car and chauffeurs him off. They arrive at the hotel where the countess is staying. Jr has a camera and tripod. They plot to get the countess to open her door to receive a box of flowers but she hears them. She tells her secretary that she is tired of reporters and wants to teach them a lesson.

The maid opens the door and the butler falls in. She takes the flowers and tells the countess he is there. He sits on a chaise longue, The countess reveals herself from behind a spiders web curtain and his hat pops off in surprise. She sits with him and starts to caress him, much to his distress. Meanwhile, Jr is trying to set up the camera outside on the balcony. The butler says "you're wasting your time - my mother has told me everything". He tries to leave and she tackles him and they end on the floor. Jr signals that he is ready to take the photo. The butler complains that she is not his type: he likes them "wide and plumpy". But he puts his arms around her. He squeezes slightly too much. She tells him to leave. Jr phones the police and says the countess is having a wild party. The butler chases the countess around the room but her secretary intervenes just as the police arrive. He gets thrown out of the window and slides down the fire escape. Jr and the butler run off and get chased by the motorcycle cop.

The police break down the countess's door pursued by several press men. They find the dinner jacket with Hornby Sr's name in it. The next morning a newspaper boy is shouting the headlines: a scandal about the countess. Hornby Sr gets a headline but he is in it! He gets a golf club ready to hit his son. Jr and the butler arrive with the cop so Hornby Sr has to delay. As soon as the cop leaves he chases both up the road.

== Cast ==
- Lillian Rich as Countess Polasky
- Tyler Brooke as Young Hornby
- Stan Laurel as Dangerfield the butler
- Bull Montana as the Countess's Private secretary
- Edwards Davis as James W. Hornby
- Leo White as Beauty expert
- Bill Brokaw as Party Guest
- William Courtright as Hornby Senior's assistant (uncredited)
- Edgar Dearing as Motorcycle cop (uncredited)
- Rolfe Sedan as Beauty expert (uncredited)

== See also ==
- List of American films of 1926
- Stan Laurel filmography
