= Short order =

Short order may refer to:

- Short Order, a 2005 Irish drama film
- Short order cooking
- Short Orders, a 1923 film
- Short Order / Eggsplode!, a 1989 Famicom/NES video game by Tose
