= Eve's Love Letters =

1927 film by Leo McCarey

- Eve's Love Letters
- Directed by: Leo McCarey
- Written by: Stan Laurel
- Produced by: Hal Roach
- Starring: Stan Laurel
- Production company: Hal Roach Studios
- Distributed by: Pathé Exchange
- Release date: May 29, 1927
- Running time: 22 minutes
- Country: United States
- Languages: Silent film English intertitles

Eve's Love Letters is a 1927 American silent comedy film featuring Stan Laurel.

== Cast ==
- Agnes Ayres as The wife
- Forrest Stanley as Adam, her husband
- Stan Laurel as Anatole, the butler
- Jerry Mandy as Mr. X aka Sir Oliver Hardy
- Fred Malatesta as Mr. X's Accomplice (uncredited)

== See also ==
- List of American films of 1927
- Stan Laurel filmography
