= Should Tall Men Marry? =

1928 film

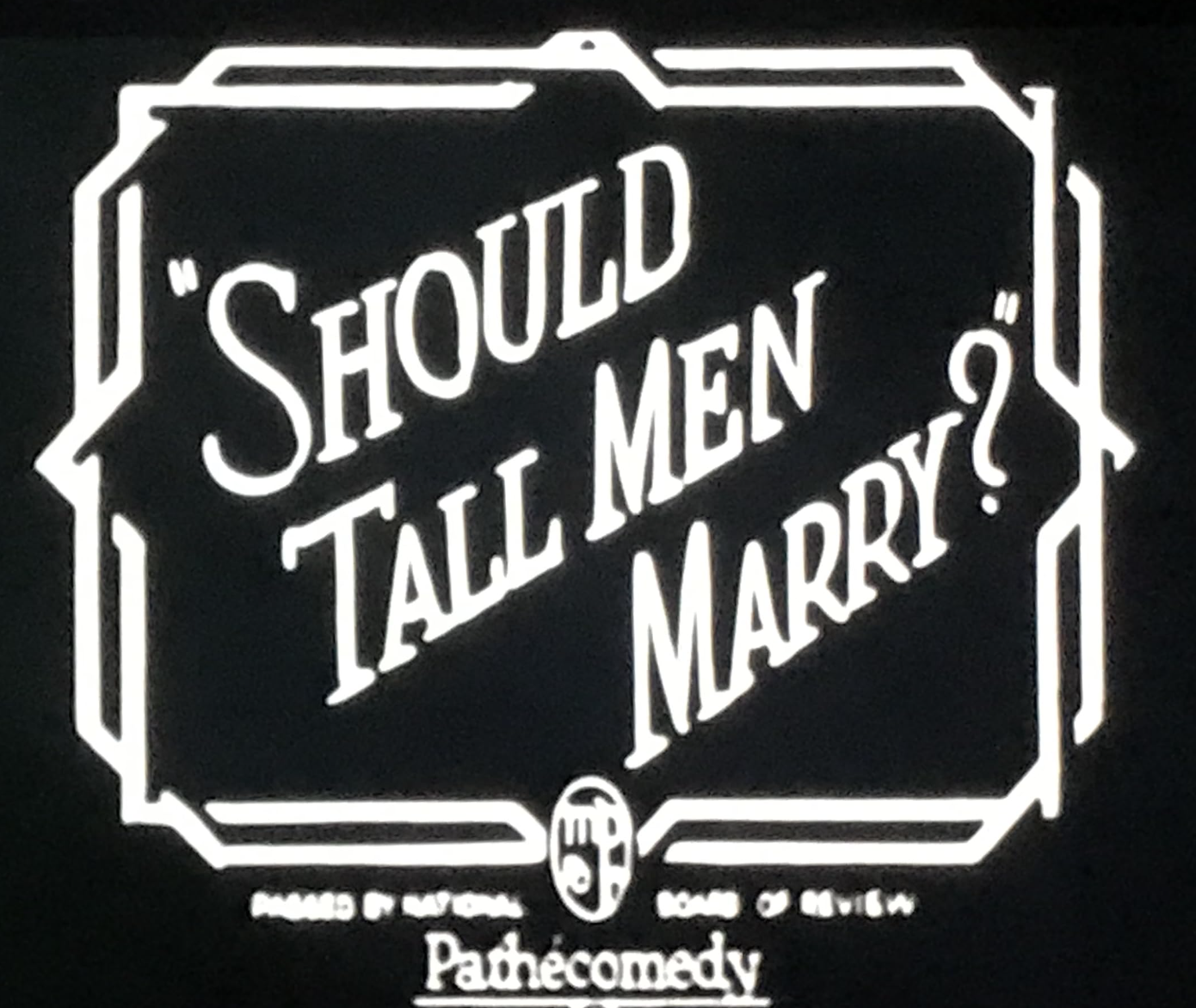
- Title card
- Directed by: Clyde Bruckman; Louis J. Gasnier
- Produced by: Hal Roach
- Starring: Stan Laurel
- Distributed by: Pathé Exchange
- Release date: January 15, 1928
- Running time: 20 minutes (2-reels)
- Country: United States
- Language: Silent with English intertitles

Should Tall Men Marry? is a 1928 American short silent comedy film featuring Stan Laurel. It was his final solo film before he took up his celebrated partnership with Oliver Hardy permanently. The 2-reel film is viewable free of charge on YouTube.

The film

== Plot ==
Joe Skittle is a successful rancher out West, although one who is unanimously disliked by his own livestock. An ornery mule especially dislikes him and attacks him at every opportunity.

Skittle's daughter has two suitors, a shy cowpoke and villain Snake-tail Sharkey, who is described as "so two faced he needs two barbers to shave him".

Meek ranch hand Texas Tommy is assigned the unenviable task of holding off Sharkey and his gang single-handed, to buy time for the daughter to get married. Texas Tommy somehow accomplishes this feat, only to have Skittle claim credit for the capture. The mule responds to this lie by chasing Skittle into the sunset.

== Cast ==
- Stan Laurel as Texas Tommy
- Stuart Holmes as Snake-tail Sharkey
- James Finlayson as Joe Skittle
- Martha Sleeper as Martha Skittle
- Theodore von Eltz as Teddy (as Teddy von Eltz)
- Edgar Dearing as Henchman (uncredited)
- Lew Meehan as Henchman (uncredited)

== See also ==
- List of American films of 1928
- Stan Laurel filmography
