= Sheiks in Bagdad =

1925 film

Sheiks in Bagdad is a 1925 American short silent comedy film directed by D. Ross Lederman, written and produced by Hal Roach. It stars Earl Mohan, Billy Engle, and Katherine Grant. It was Lederman's first directorial credit.
