= Near Dublin =

1924 film

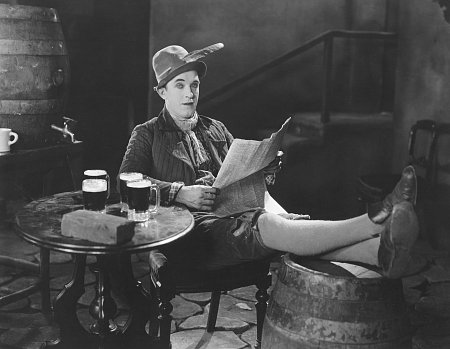
- Stan Laurel in Near Dublin.
- Directed by: Ralph Ceder
- Written by: H. M. Walker
- Produced by: Hal Roach
- Starring: Stan Laurel
- Cinematography: Frank Young
- Edited by: Thomas J. Crizer
- Production company: Hal Roach Studios
- Distributed by: Pathé Exchange
- Release date: May 11, 1924
- Running time: 20 minutes
- Country: United States
- Language: Silent (English intertitles)

Near Dublin is a 1924 American silent short comedy film directed by Ralph Ceder and starring Stan Laurel. A print of this film exists.

== Plot ==
As described in a film magazine review, Stan is a postman in the Irish village and is in love with the belle of the town. His rival is a brick manufacturer who makes bricks for both building and social purposes such as being used by all the Irish men, women, and children in fighting. Stan is thrown into jail on a trumped up charge but escapes and, in a battle with his rival, he is knocked out by a rap on the head. The villain is jailed and Stan wins the affections of the lady.

== Cast ==
- Stan Laurel as Con
- Ena Gregory as The girl
- James Finlayson as Brick merchant
- George Rowe as Cop
- James T. Kelley as (as Jim Kelly)
- Dick Gilbert as Girl's father
- Charlie Hall as Villager
- Fred Karno Jr. as Villager
- Helen Gilmore as Villager
- Jack Gavin as Villager
- Mae Laurel as Villager
- Jack Ackroyd
- Eddie Baker
- Sammy Brooks as Barn dance musician
- Billy Engle
- William Gillespie as Barn dance musician
- Patrick Kelly
- Charles Lloyd
- Earl Mohan
- Glenn Tryon
- Leo Willis

== See also ==
- List of American films of 1924
