= Mother's Joy =

1923 film

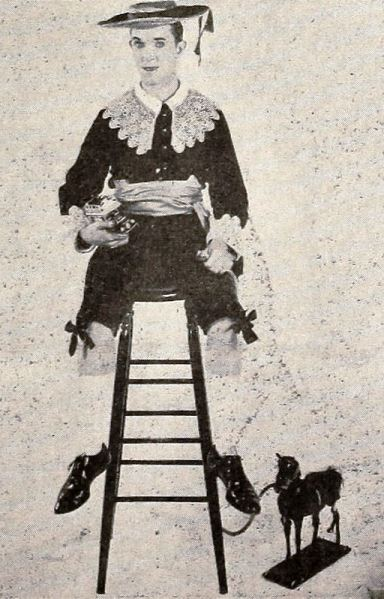
- Film still
- Directed by: Ralph Ceder
- Written by: H. M. Walker
- Produced by: Hal Roach
- Starring: Stan Laurel
- Cinematography: Frank Young
- Edited by: Thomas J. Crizer
- Production company: Hal Roach Studios
- Distributed by: Pathé Exchange
- Release date: December 23, 1923
- Running time: 20 minutes
- Country: United States
- Language: Silent (English intertitles)

Mother's Joy is a 1923 American silent comedy film starring Stan Laurel. A print of Mother's Joy exists.

== Cast ==
- Stan Laurel as Magnus Dippytack/Basil Dippytack, his son
- Ena Gregory as Maid
- Mae Laurel as Miss Flavia de Lorgnette
- James Finlayson as Baron Buttontop
- Jack Ackroyd as Attorney McFumble
- William Gillespie as Houseguest
- Helen Gilmore as Dippy
- George Rowe - Waiter
- Charlie Hall as Houseguest
- Charles Lloyd
- Earl Mohan
- Laura Roessing
- Glenn Tryon
- 'Tonnage' Martin Wolfkeil

== See also ==
- List of American films of 1923
- Stan Laurel filmography
