= Eddie Baker =

American actor (1897–1968)

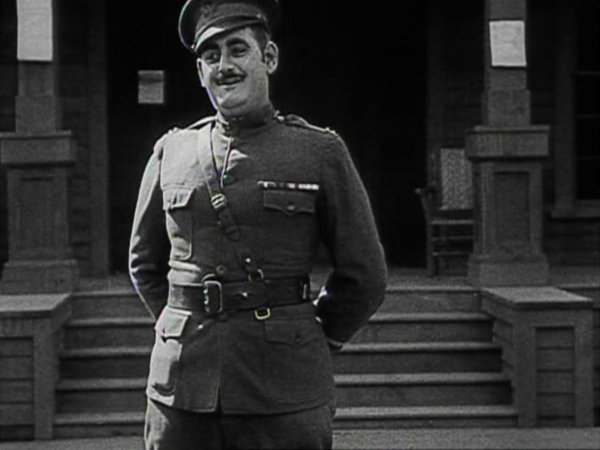
- Born: Edward King; November 17, 1897; Davis, West Virginia, US
- Died: February 4, 1968 (aged 70); Hollywood, California, US
- Occupation: Actor
- Years active: 1917–1965

Eddie Baker (born Edward King; November 17, 1897 – February 4, 1968) was an American film actor. He supported Laurel and Hardy in several of their films, but is best remembered for his (uncredited) role as a boxing referee in Charlie Chaplin's City Lights (1931).

He appeared in more than 170 films between 1917 and 1965. He was born in Davis, West Virginia and died in Hollywood, California from emphysema.

== Partial filmography ==
- Under Two Jags (1923, Short) – Minor Role (uncredited)
- Collars and Cuffs (1923, Short) – Laundry Worker
- Kill or Cure (1923, Short) – Sheriff
- Gas and Air (1923, Short) – Customer
- Oranges and Lemons (1923, Short) – Orange Blossom – the boss
- Her Dangerous Path (1923) – Jack Reynolds
- Short Orders (1923, Short) – Cafe owner
- A Man About Town (1923, Short) – Cop
- The Soilers (1923, Short) – Prospector
- Smithy (1924, Short) – Minor Role (uncredited)
- Postage Due (1924, Short) – Villain
- Zeb vs. Paprika (1924, Short) – Stable Hand
- Brothers Under the Chin (1924, Short)
- Near Dublin (1924, Short)
- Hold Your Breath (1924) – Detective
- Battling Orioles (1924) – Cop (uncredited)
- Bacon Grabbers (1929, Short) – Sheriff
- All at Sea (1929) – The Marine
- City Lights (1931) – Boxing Fight Referee (uncredited)
- Come Clean (1931) - Detective (uncredited)
- Pardon Us (1931) – Plantation Boss (uncredited)
- Monkey Business (1931) – Ship's Officer (uncredited)
- Free Eats (1932, Short) – Detective's assistant
- The Beast of the City (1932) – Detective (uncredited)
- Choo-Choo! (1932, Short) – Officer
- Make Me a Star (1932) – Studio Workman (uncredited)
- Million Dollar Legs (1932) – Train Official (uncredited)
- If I Had a Million (1932) – Second Desk Clerk (uncredited)
- From Hell to Heaven (1933) – Racetrack Tout (uncredited)
- A Lady's Profession (1933) – Third Officer (uncredited)
- Tillie and Gus (1933) – Riverboat Race Judge (uncredited)
- Sons of the Desert (1933) – Son of the Desert (uncredited)
- Miss Fane's Baby Is Stolen (1934) – Motorcycle Cop No. 3 (uncredited)
- No More Women (1934) – Chuck (uncredited)
- Come On Marines! (1934) – Marine (uncredited)
- You're Telling Me! (1934) – First Motorcycle Cop (uncredited)
- Finishing School (1934) – Minor Role (uncredited)
- Monte Carlo Nights (1934) – Motor Patrolman (uncredited)
- Beyond the Law (1934) – Detective
- Our Daily Bread (1934) – Deputy Sheriff (uncredited)
- Elmer and Elsie (1934) – Evans
- The Party's Over (1934) – Parking Station Attendant (uncredited)
- Among the Missing (1934) – Cop (uncredited)
- The Lemon Drop Kid (1934) – Road Cop #2 (uncredited)
- The Captain Hates the Sea (1934) – Purser (uncredited)
- Babes in Toyland (1934) – Dunker (uncredited)
- It's a Gift (1934) – Yard Attendant (uncredited)
- Mills of the Gods (1934) – Motorcycle Sergeant
- Bachelor of Arts (1934) – Police Officer (uncredited)
- Symphony of Living (1935) – Detective (uncredited)
- Wings in the Dark (1935) – Radio Man, Last Flight (uncredited)
- The Whole Town's Talking (1935) – Policeman (uncredited)
- I'll Love You Always (1935) – Doorman (uncredited)
- Princess O'Hara (1935) – Policeman (uncredited)
- The Bride Walks Out (1936) – Minor Role (uncredited)
- 36 Hours to Kill (1936) – Motor Officer (uncredited)
- Wedding Present (1936) – Motorcycle Cop (uncredited)
- The Devil Is Driving (1937) – Motorcycle Cop (uncredited)
- Identity Unknown (1945) – Motorcycle Cop
- Let's Dance (1950) – Policeman (uncredited)
- Trial (1955) – Electrician (uncredited)
- The Steel Jungle (1956) – Schiller
- Dakota Incident (1956) – Townsman (uncredited)
- Giant (1956) – Governor North (uncredited)
- Runaway Daughters (1956) – (uncredited)
- Hell's Crossroads (1957) – Mr. Feniweather (uncredited)
- Public Pigeon No. 1 (1957) – Mr. Glover (uncredited)
- Loving You (1957) – Fair Attendee (uncredited)
- Witness for the Prosecution (1957) – Courtroom Spectator (uncredited)
- I Mobster (1959) – Labor Union Boss (uncredited)
- Heller in Pink Tights (1960) – Bonanza Audience Member (uncredited)
- Please Don't Eat the Daisies (1960) – Sardi's Patron (uncredited)
- Inherit the Wind (1960) – Courtroom Reporter (uncredited)
- G.I. Blues (1960) – Diner Patron (uncredited)
- The Facts of Life (1960) – Man at Airport (uncredited)
- Madison Avenue (1961) – Audience Member (uncredited)
- Cape Fear (1962) – Defendant (uncredited)
- Advise & Consent (1962) – Senator (uncredited)
- To Kill a Mockingbird (1962) – Courtroom Spectator (uncredited)
- Ship of Fools (1965) – Prizak (uncredited)
- The Bounty Killer (1965) – Townsman (uncredited)
- A Rage to Live (1965) – Restaurant Patron (uncredited)
