= Scorching Sands =

1923 film

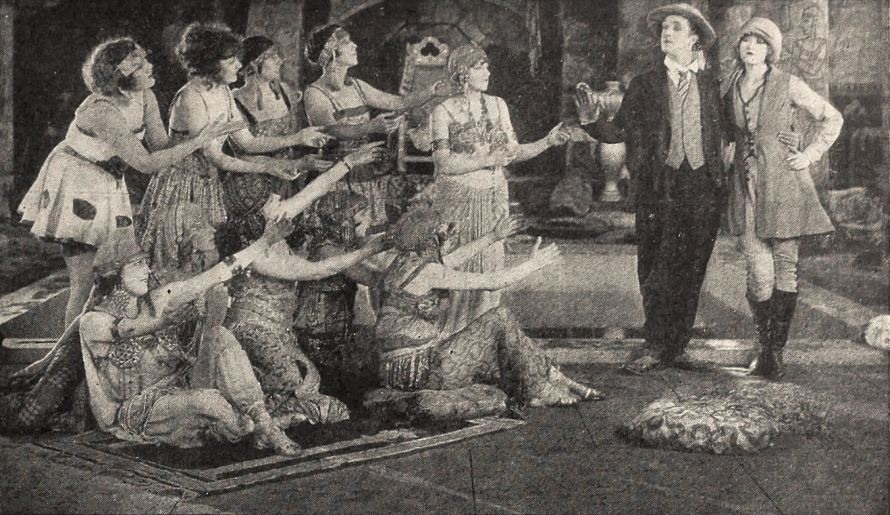
- Film still
- Directed by: Hal Roach; Robin Williamson
- Produced by: Hal Roach
- Starring: Stan Laurel
- Cinematography: Frank Young
- Production company: Hal Roach Studios
- Distributed by: Pathé Exchange
- Release date: December 9, 1923
- Running time: 10 minutes
- Country: United States
- Language: Silent (English intertitles)

Scorching Sands is a 1923 American silent comedy film starring Stan Laurel. The title is a play on that of the 1922 Paramount Pictures film Burning Sands.

== Cast ==
- Stan Laurel as Stan
- James Finlayson as James
- Katherine Grant as Tourist
- George Rowe as Arab
- Sammy Brooks
- Billy Engle
- William Gillespie as French officer
- Mark Jones as Arab leader
- Merta Sterling
- Charles Stevenson as Arab

== See also ==
- List of American films of 1923
