= The Whole Truth (1923 film) =

1923 film

- Directed by: Ralph Ceder
- Written by: H. M. Walker (titles)
- Produced by: Hal Roach
- Starring: Stan Laurel
- Production company: Hal Roach Studios
- Distributed by: Pathé Exchange
- Release date: November 4, 1923
- Running time: 10 minutes
- Country: United States
- Languages: Silent film English intertitles

The Whole Truth is a 1923 American film starring Stan Laurel.

== Cast ==
- Stan Laurel as The husband
- James Finlayson as Defense lawyer
- Earl Mohan as Florist
- Helen Gilmore as The wife
- Jack Ackroyd as Clerk
- Wallace Howe as Chemist
- Charles Stevenson as Jewish tailor

== See also ==
- List of American films of 1923
