= Marvin Loback =

American actor (1896–1938)

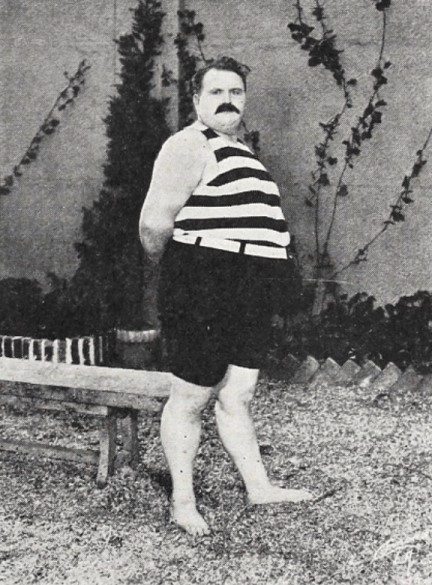
- From a 1925 magazine
- Born: November 21, 1896; Tacoma, Washington, US
- Died: August 18, 1938 (aged 41); Los Angeles, California, US
- Years active: 1916–1935

Marvin Oscar Loback, sometimes billed as Marvin Lobach (November 21, 1896 – August 18, 1938), was an American film actor. He appeared in more than 110 films between 1916 and 1935.

Loback was born in Tacoma, Washington. He joined the Los Angeles film community in 1918 with Universal's Jewel comedies. Later that year he joined Henry Lehrman's L-KO company, promoting himself in trade ads as "Marvin Loback, L-KO 330-Pound Comedian." He played character roles in comedies and westerns into the 1920s, signing with Hal Roach in 1923 and then Mack Sennett in 1924. Sennett usually billed the actor as "Marvin Lobach."

In 1927 Loback was hired by Weiss Bros. to co-star with Snub Pollard as a fat-and-skinny comedy team, patterned after the new Laurel and Hardy partnership. These low-budget films were obvious imitations, with Pollard and Loback using Laurel and Hardy's derby hats and some of their situations. Even so, the Pollard-Loback comedies were successful as lower-priced alternatives, and lasted through 1929. These were Marvin Loback's only starring roles, and it is for these films that he is best known.

Loback then returned to the Sennett studio, working in two-reel comedies until the studio discontinued production in 1933. He joined Columbia Pictures in 1934, where he worked in feature films and short subjects. By late 1935 there were no further film assignments for the actor, and he turned to the Los Angeles stage. He appeared in the federally funded WPA plays "If It Pleases the Court" (1936) and "Roaring Girl" (1937).

Marvin Loback died on August 18, 1938, at the age of 41.

== Selected filmography ==
- Follow the Crowd (1918)
- Kicked Out (1918)
- A Small Town Idol (1921)
- Hands Off! (1921)
- White Wings (1923)
- The Soilers (1923)
- Off His Trolley (1924) (credited as Marvin Lobach)
- Smithy (1924)
- Sock and Run (1927)
- Mitt the Prince (1927)
- The Big Shot (1927)
- Sing, Bing, Sing (1933)
- Uncivil Warriors (1935)
- Three Little Beers (1935)
