= Short Kilts =

1924 film

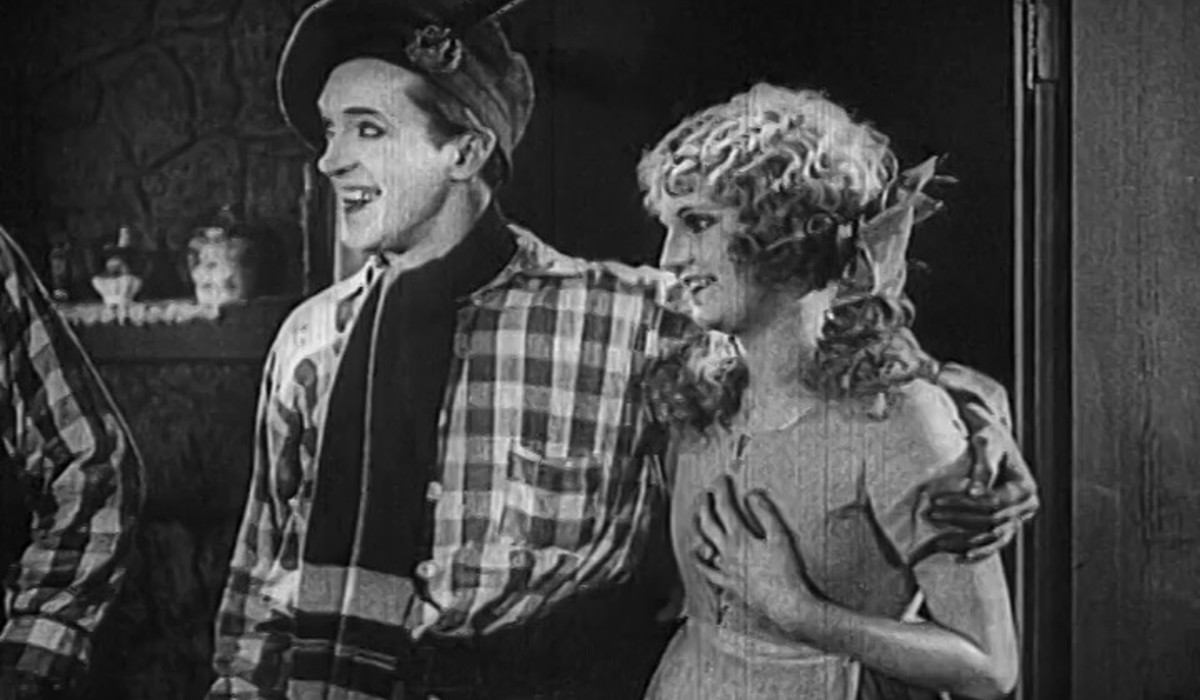
- Stan Laurel and Ena Gregory in Short Kilts
- Directed by: George Jeske
- Written by: H. M. Walker
- Produced by: Hal Roach
- Starring: Stan Laurel
- Cinematography: Frank Young
- Edited by: Thomas J. Crizer
- Production company: Hal Roach Studios
- Distributed by: Pathé Exchange
- Release date: August 3, 1924
- Running time: 21 minutes
- Country: United States
- Languages: Silent film English intertitles

Short Kilts is a 1924 American silent short comedy film starring Stan Laurel.

== Plot ==
According to the copyright description, "Laurel is the son of a canny Scotchman and he is in love with the daughter of a neighboring family whose parents object to the match. Laurel's family is invited to dinner and during the festivities which follow, much horse-play is indulged in and during this the couple take themselves away to the nearest minister and get married. Unknown to them, Laurel's sister is also in love with Laurel's wife's brother and they too get wed, and to celebrate the double wedding a big feast is prepared and pleasant relationships are once more established amongst the families."

== Cast ==
- Stan Laurel - McPherson's son
- James Finlayson - McGregor's son
- Mickey Daniels - McPherson kid
- Ena Gregory - McGregor's daughter
- George Rowe - Blacksmith
- Mary Kornman - McGregor kid
- Leo Willis - McGregor
- Jack Gavin - McPherson
- 'Tonnage' Martin Wolfkeil - McHungry's son
- Sammy Brooks - McHungry
- Helen Gilmore - Mrs. McHungry

== See also ==
- List of American films of 1924
