= The Pest (1922 film) =

1922 film

- Directed by: Broncho Billy Anderson
- Produced by: Broncho Billy Anderson
- Starring: Stan Laurel
- Cinematography: Irving G. Ries
- Distributed by: Metro Pictures
- Release date: December 4, 1922
- Country: United States
- Languages: Silent film English intertitles

The Pest is a 1922 American silent comedy film starring Stan Laurel as Jimmy Smith, who is going door to door hoping to sell copies of a book about Napoleon Bonaparte. He encounters a young woman who will be evicted from her house unless she agrees to marry the landlord. He vows to get the money she needs.

== Cast ==
- Stan Laurel as Jimmy Smith
- Glen Cavender as The landlord
- Vera Reynolds as The poor tenant
- Joy Winthrop as The pest
- Mae Laurel as A woman in court

== See also ==
- List of American films of 1922
- Mixed Nuts (1922) film using footage from The Pest and Nuts in May (1917)
