= Pete and Repeat =

1931 film

- Directed by: Fatty Arbuckle (as William Goodrich)
- Written by: George Jeske; Joey Mack; Ernest Pagano
- Starring: Bud Harrison
- Release date: March 1, 1931
- Running time: 21 minutes
- Country: United States
- Language: English

Pete and Repeat is a 1931 American comedy film directed by Fatty Arbuckle.

== Cast ==
- Bud Harrison
- Peenie Elmo

== See also ==
- Fatty Arbuckle filmography
