= Roughest Africa =

1923 film

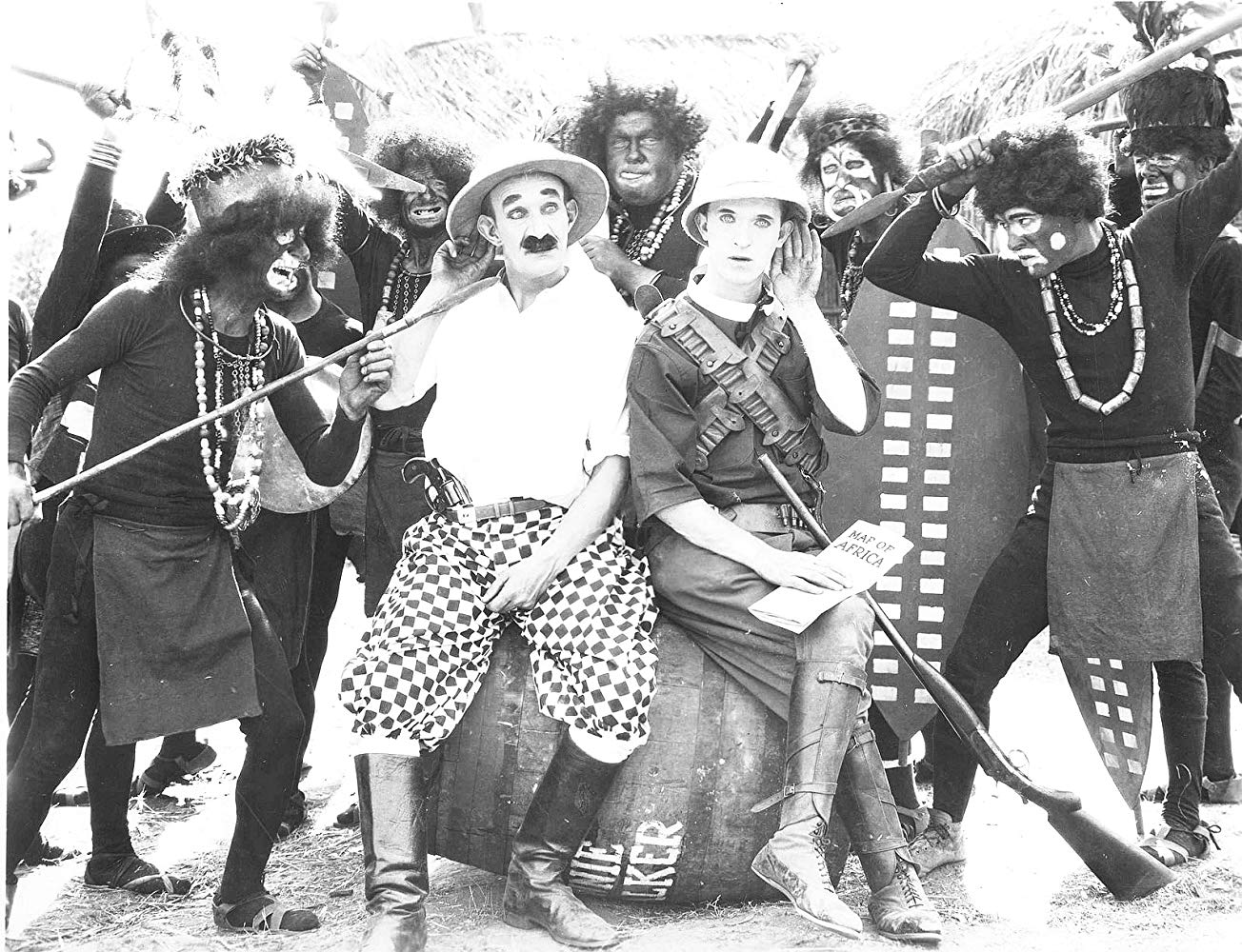
- Directed by: Ralph Ceder
- Produced by: Hal Roach
- Starring: Stan Laurel
- Cinematography: George Stevens; Frank Young
- Edited by: Carl Himm
- Release date: September 30, 1923
- Running time: 29 minutes
- Country: United States
- Languages: Silent film English intertitles

Roughest Africa is a 1923 American silent comedy film starring Stan Laurel.

== Cast ==
- Stan Laurel as Prof. Stanislaus Laurello (Big Boss)
- Katherine Grant as Mrs. Laurello
- James Finlayson as Lt. Hans Downe (Little Boss)

== See also ==
- List of American films of 1923
- Stan Laurel filmography
