= Pick and Shovel =

1923 film

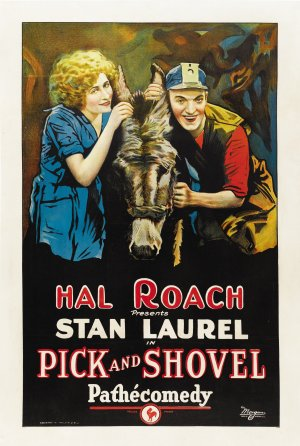
- Film poster
- Directed by: George Jeske
- Produced by: Hal Roach
- Starring: Stan Laurel
- Cinematography: Frank Young
- Production company: Hal Roach Studios
- Distributed by: Pathé Exchange
- Release date: June 17, 1923
- Running time: 13 minutes
- Country: United States
- Languages: Silent film English intertitles

Pick and Shovel (1923)

Pick and Shovel, also known as The Miner, is a 1923 silent comedy short film starring Stan Laurel.

== Cast ==
- Stan Laurel - Miner
- James Finlayson - The foreman
- Katherine Grant - His daughter
- George Rowe - Miner
- Sammy Brooks - Miner
- William Gillespie - The boss

== See also ==
- List of American films of 1923
