= Mae Dahlberg =

Australian-born vaudeville performer and actress (1888–1969)

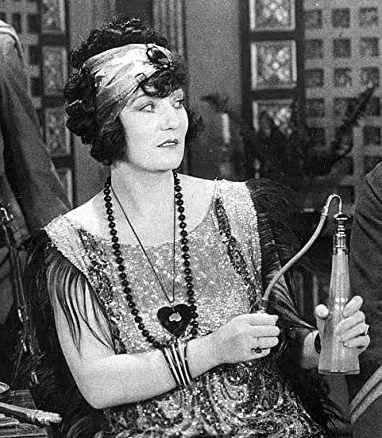
- Dahlberg in Rupert of Hee Haw (1924)
- Born: Mae Charlotte Dahlberg; 24 May 1888; Brunswick, Melbourne, Australia
- Died: 1969 (aged 80–81); New York City, U.S.
- Other names: Mae Laurel
- Occupations: Vaudeville performer; actress
- Spouse: Rupert Cuthbert (m. 1906, divorced)
- Partner: Stan Laurel (1917–1925)
- Children: 1

Mae Charlotte Dahlberg (24 May 1888 – 1969), also known as Mae Laurel, was an Australian-born vaudeville performer and actress. She was Stan Laurel's partner from 1917 to 1925.

== Childhood and career in Australia ==
She was born May Dahlberg on 24 May 1888 in the inner Melbourne suburb of Brunswick, Victoria, Australia, to Mary Jane (née Gundry) and labourer Louis Dahlberg. By 1905, she had begun to earn a reputation performing as a singer and dancer on the Australian stage, with positive reviews. In 1906, she married baritone and fellow performer Rupert Cuthbert while in Hobart, Tasmania. A child, Rupert Clifton Saxe Cuthbert, was born of the union in 1908, in Melbourne.

In about 1913, Dahlberg and Cuthbert sailed for the United States.

== Career in the U.S. ==
Dahlberg and Cuthbert's personal and professional relationship apparently did not last. While performing in a "sister act" in California, Dahlberg met and formed a variety act with Stan Laurel. In 1917 she played in a comedy short, Nuts in May, notable as the screen debut of Stan Laurel (credited as Stan Jefferson). Mae Dahlberg is credited as "Mae Laurel" in several of her films.

Though Stan and Mae never married, as professional partners they lived together from 1917 to 1925. Mae maintained that it was she who suggested Stan change his name to Laurel.

By 1924, Laurel had given up the stage for full-time film work under contract with Joe Rock for 12 two-reel comedies. The contract had one stipulation: Dahlberg was not to appear in any of the films. Rock thought her temperament was hindering Laurel's career. In 1925, when she started interfering with Laurel's work, Rock offered her a cash settlement and a one-way ticket back to her native Australia, which she accepted. Her last film had been Wide Open Spaces, made for Hal Roach in 1924 with Laurel and fellow Australian Ena Gregory in the leading roles.

Dahlberg returned to the U.S. a few years later, and in November 1937, she sued the now successful Stan Laurel for financial support. The matter was settled out of court. She was described as a "relief project worker" by the court.

Although Dahlberg appears to have lived in Melbourne again for some time during the 1940s, she returned to the United States again. She died in New York in 1969.

== Filmography ==
=== Film ===
Year	Title	Role	Notes
1917	Nuts in May		short film
1918	Huns and Hyphens	Woman	short film
1918	Bears and Bad Men	Scared Woman	short film
1922	Mud and Sand	La Paloma aka Pavaloosky	short film
1922	The Pest	Court Woman	short film
1923	When Knights were Cold	Countless Out, a Classy Eve	short film
1923	Under Two Jags	The Princess	short film
1923	Frozen Hearts	Madame XXX	short film
1923	The Soilers	Woman in Saloon	short film
1923	Mother's Joy	Miss Flavia de Lorgnette	short film
1924	Near Dublin	Villager	short film
1924	Rupert of Hee Haw	The Princess	short film
1924	Wide Open Spaces	Calamity Jane	short film
2011	Laurel & Hardy: Their Lives and Magic	Self	archive footage, uncredited, posthumously release

=== Television ===
Year	Title	Role	Notes
2003	Living Famously	Pavaloosky	archive footage, uncredited, posthumously release, episode: Laurel & Hardy
