= Save the Ship =

1923 film

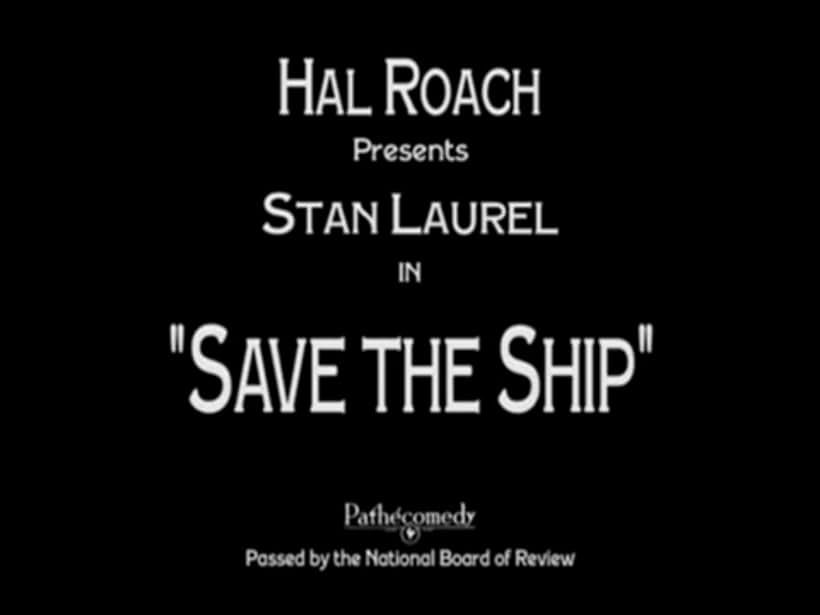
- Directed by: George Jeske; Hal Roach
- Produced by: Hal Roach
- Starring: Stan Laurel
- Cinematography: Robert Doran
- Distributed by: Pathé Exchange
- Release date: November 18, 1923
- Running time: 10 minutes
- Country: United States
- Languages: Silent film English intertitles

Save the Ship is a 1923 American silent comedy film starring Stan Laurel. A print of Save the Ship exists.

== Cast ==
- Stan Laurel - Husband
- Marie Mosquini - Wife
- Mark Jones - Father-in-law

== See also ==
- List of American films of 1923
