= Short Orders =

1923 film

- Directed by: Scott Pembroke; Hal Roach
- Written by: Hal Roach
- Produced by: Hal Roach
- Starring: Stan Laurel
- Cinematography: Robert Doran
- Distributed by: Hal Roach Studios
- Release date: September 2, 1923
- Running time: 12 minutes
- Country: United States
- Languages: Silent film English intertitles

Short Orders is a 1923 film starring Stan Laurel.

== Cast ==
- Stan Laurel - Waiter
- Marie Mosquini - Cashier
- Eddie Baker - Cafe owner
- Jack Ackroyd - Customer
- Mark Jones - Customer
- George Rowe - Chef

== See also ==
- List of American films of 1923
- Stan Laurel filmography
