= White Wing =

White Wing may refer to:

- AEA White Wing, an experimental aircraft
- Operation White Wing, a battle of the Vietnam War

== See also ==
- White Wings (disambiguation)
- Whitewing (disambiguation)
