= A Man About Town =

1923 film

- Directed by: George Jeske
- Produced by: Hal Roach
- Starring: Stan Laurel
- Cinematography: Frank Young
- Distributed by: Pathé Exchange
- Release date: September 16, 1923
- Running time: 12 minutes
- Country: United States
- Languages: Silent film English intertitles

A Man About Town is a 1923 American silent film starring Stan Laurel.

== Cast ==
- Stan Laurel as A man about town
- Katherine Grant as the girl
- James Finlayson as Humko, store detective
- Charles Stevenson as Shop assistant
- George Rowe as Cross-eyed barber
- Mark Jones as Cross-eyed barber
- Eddie Baker as Cop
- Sammy Brooks as Bit Role (uncredited)
- Sunshine Hart as Bit Role (uncredited)
- Sam Lufkin as Bit Role (uncredited)

== See also ==
- List of American films of 1923
- Stan Laurel filmography
