= Whitewing =

Whitewing may refer to:

- Common chaffinch, a small bird of the finch family
- Velvet scoter, a bird of the duck family
- Whitewing, a character in the Warriors novel series written by Erin Hunter

== See also ==
- White Wing (disambiguation)
- All pages beginning in White-wing
