= Under Two Jags =

1923 film

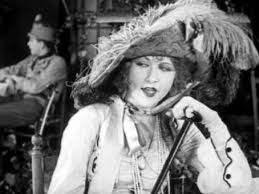
- Still with Katherine Grant
- Directed by: George Jeske
- Produced by: Hal Roach
- Starring: Stan Laurel
- Cinematography: Frank Young
- Production company: Hal Roach Studios
- Distributed by: Pathé Exchange
- Release date: June 3, 1923
- Running time: 11 minutes
- Country: United States
- Language: Silent (English intertitles)

Under Two Jags is a 1923 American silent comedy film featuring Stan Laurel. The title spoofs the film Under Two Flags (1922).

== Plot ==
The film is set in the city of Scorching Sands in the Desert of Dhumbell.

Stan is the only westerner on the street until he enters a saloon which has soldiers watching a girl in uniform (and wearing a fez) dancing on a table. Stan blows the foam off his beer and it hits the officer in the face. He beckons Stan over. He is about to leave when the girl says Stop. He flips a coin and decides to join the soldiers.

Stan is then in uniform chatting with the girl. A posh lady stops to speak to him. Stan drops a bottle of beer and the spray soaks everyone.

On parade Stan is ten seconds behind the rest and struggles to find a place in the row. The men form a ladder of rifles and he climbs a wall. The officer kisses each man on the cheek as he gives out medals. Stan pushes the officer away when he goes to kiss him.

Stan is locked in the stockade but the door falls off. He is stood against a pole to be shot. Alongside a man digs a grave. They blindfold him and prepare to shoot, but the girl rides up and saves him.

== Cast ==
- Stan Laurel
- Katherine Grant as The Princess
- Mae Laurel as Cheroot
- Sammy Brooks as Gunner (credited as Sam Brooks)
- Charles Stevenson as Arab Officer (credited as Charles E. Stevenson)
- William Gillespie as Officer
- Eddie Baker as Bit Role (uncredited)
- Roy Brooks as Bit Role (uncredited)
- George Rowe as Bit Role (uncredited)
