= George Jeske =

American screenwriter

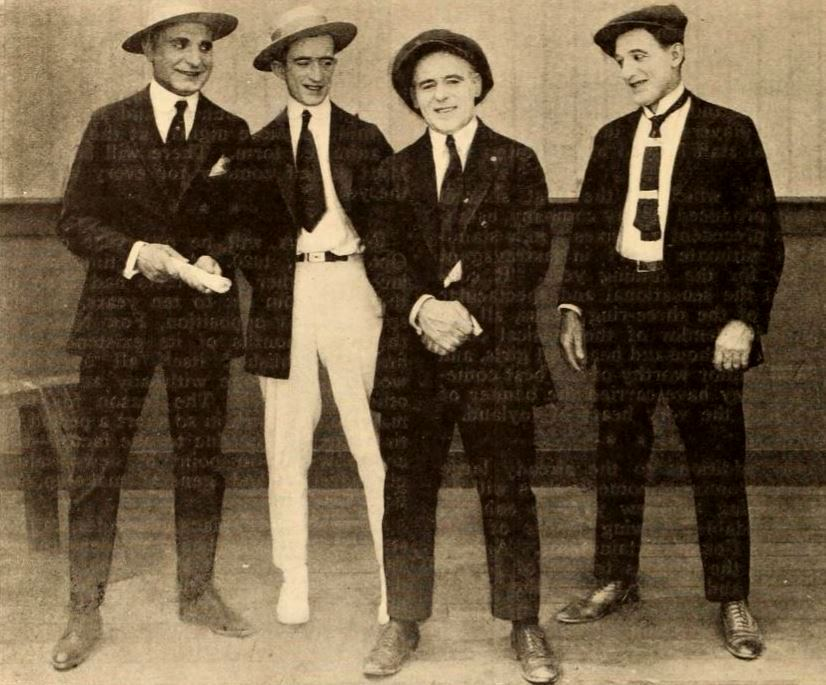
- George Jeske, Charles Haefeli, Billy Franey, and Charles Post in 1920
- Born: George Washington Jeske; February 22, 1891; Salt Lake City, Utah, U.S.
- Died: October 28, 1951 (aged 60); Los Angeles, California, U.S.
- Occupations: Screenwriter; Film director Actor
- Years active: 1922–1946

George Washington Jeske (February 22, 1891 – October 28, 1951) was an American screenwriter, director, and actor.

== Career ==
Jeske was born in Salt Lake City, Utah in 1891. He was one of the original Keystone Cops for Mack Sennett. George was disfigured in a water heater accident. He later ran a movie theater in Indio, CA

He wrote for more than 50 films between 1926 and 1946, including the Torchy film series with Ray Cooke in the title role. He also directed 37 films between 1922 and 1933. He died in Los Angeles, California.

== Selected filmography ==
List of George Jeske films
Year	Title	Credit	Notes
1912	Hoffmeyer's Legacy	Actor	
1914	In the Clutches of the Gang	Director	
1919	Salome vs. Shenandoah	Actor	
1923	The Noon Whistle	Director	
1923	White Wings	Director	
1923	Under Two Jags	Director	
1923	Pick and Shovel	Director	
1923	Collars and Cuffs	Director	
1923	Oranges and Lemons	Director	
1923	A Man About Town	Director	
1923	Save the Ship	Director	
1924	Smithy	Director	
1924	Postage Due	Director	
1924	Wide Open Spaces	Director	
1924	Short Kilts	Director	
1931	Pete and Repeat	Writer	
1932	Midnight Patrol	Screenplay	
1933	The Flaming Signal	Director	
1935	Skybound	Screenplay	
1937	Should Wives Work?	Writer	Nominated for Academy Award for Best Short Subject (Two-Reel).
