= Frozen Hearts =

1923 film

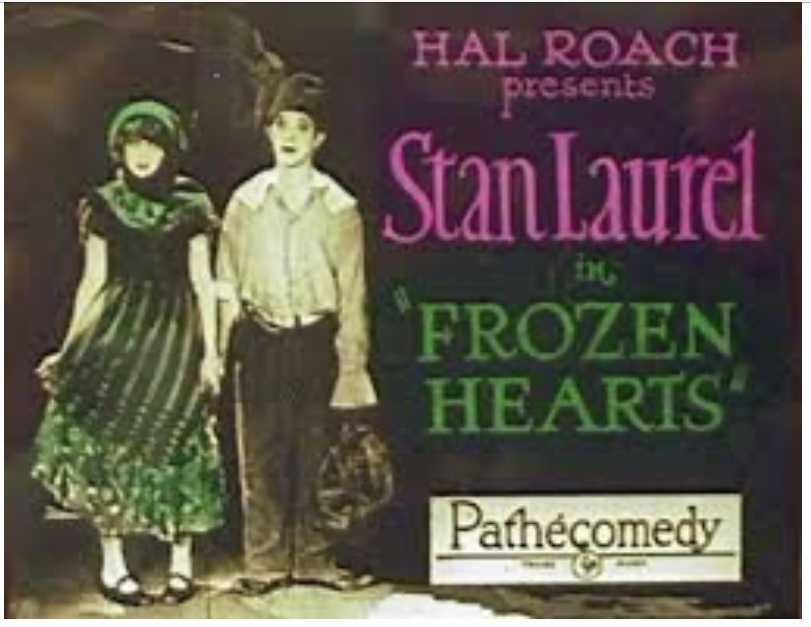
- Directed by: J. A. Howe
- Produced by: Hal Roach
- Starring: Stan Laurel
- Cinematography: Frank Young
- Distributed by: Pathé Exchange
- Release date: October 28, 1923
- Running time: 25 minutes
- Country: United States
- Language: Silent (English intertitles)

Frozen Hearts is a 1923 American silent comedy film starring Stan Laurel. One of a number of films he made before teaming up with Oliver Hardy, here peasant Stan duels with the ruling elite in Tsarist Russia for the love of his girl. The film also featured Laurel's common law wife Mae Laurel. This film exists.

== Cast ==
- Stan Laurel as Peasant Ivan Kektumoff
- James Finlayson as General Sappovitch
- Katherine Grant as Sonia, the peasant girl
- Mae Laurel as Princess
- Pierre Couderc as Count Alexis Pifflevitch
- George Rowe as Soldier
- Sammy Brooks as The general's second
- Tyler Brooke as Bit Role (uncredited)
- Jack Gavin as Bit Role (uncredited)
- William Gillespie as Spectator at duel (uncredited)
- Ena Gregory as Bit Role (uncredited) (unconfirmed)
- Earl Mohan as Bit Role (uncredited)

== See also ==
- List of American films of 1923
- Stan Laurel filmography
