= Oranges and Lemons (film) =

1923 film

- Directed by: George Jeske
- Produced by: Hal Roach
- Starring: Stan Laurel
- Cinematography: Frank Young
- Production company: Hal Roach Studios
- Distributed by: Pathé Exchange
- Release date: August 12, 1923
- Running time: 12 minutes
- Country: United States
- Languages: Silent film English intertitles

Oranges and Lemons is a 1923 American one-reel silent comedy film starring Stan Laurel. He plays an incompetent employee of a fruit orchard who only manages to keep his job because his fellow workers are even more inept, including the lovely packer (Grant) who flirts with him. As is typical of his films in this era, his character is far more aggressive and physical than the more familiar meek personality he adopted when he later teamed with Oliver Hardy.

The name "Sunkist" was taken from the long-established citrus fruit company Sunkist Growers, Incorporated.

== Plot ==
Sunkist (Stan) wearing an under-sized sombrero is operating a pointless machine, where his boss drops fruit into a hopper at one end, and the fruit is scooped up and dropped into a tin bath held by another employee. None of the fruit is going in so they swap roles and Stan gets the fruit dropping on his head.

Stan goes off to collect on his own then a fat worker asks for help. A step ladder with a rubber central sections adds to the hilarity.

The boss chases Sunkist around and action moves inside the packing plant.

== Cast ==
- Stan Laurel as Sunkist
- Katherine Grant as Little Valencia
- Eddie Baker as Orange Blossom, the boss
- George Rowe as Worker
- Sammy Brooks as Worker
- Mark Jones as Worker
- 'Tonnage' Martin Wolfkeil as Worker
- James Finlayson as Worker

== See also ==
- List of American films of 1923
