= Gas and Air (film) =

1923 film

- Directed by: Scott Pembroke
- Produced by: Hal Roach
- Starring: Stan Laurel
- Cinematography: Frank Young
- Production company: Hal Roach Studios
- Distributed by: Pathé Exchange
- Release date: July 29, 1923
- Running time: 10 minutes
- Country: United States
- Languages: Silent film English intertitles

Gas and Air is a 1923 American silent short comedy film directed by Scott Pembroke featuring Stan Laurel.

== Plot ==
According to the copyright description, "Stan Laurel works as an assistant to a public garage owner, who also runs a luncheon stand which is presided over by his pretty daughter. Stan’s efforts when not taken up by his garage duties, are directed toward the captivation of his employer's daughter's heart. He is doing very nicely until the irate parent interferes, and sends him with a wrecking-car to bring in a damaged auto. The wrecking car however, is well named, and just about lasts long enough to reach the scene of the automobile accident. When Stan's long absence causes the garage owner to wonder what has happened, the garage owner sets out to find out why, and many comedy situations ensue both on his arrival, and during their attempts to bring about the wrecking car and the wreck itself."

== Cast ==
- Stan Laurel as Phillup McCann
- Katherine Grant as Garage owner's daughter
- Eddie Baker as Customer
- Charles Stevenson as Garage owner
- Noah Young
- Roy Brooks

== See also ==
- List of American films of 1923
