= Billy Engle =

American actor (1889–1966)

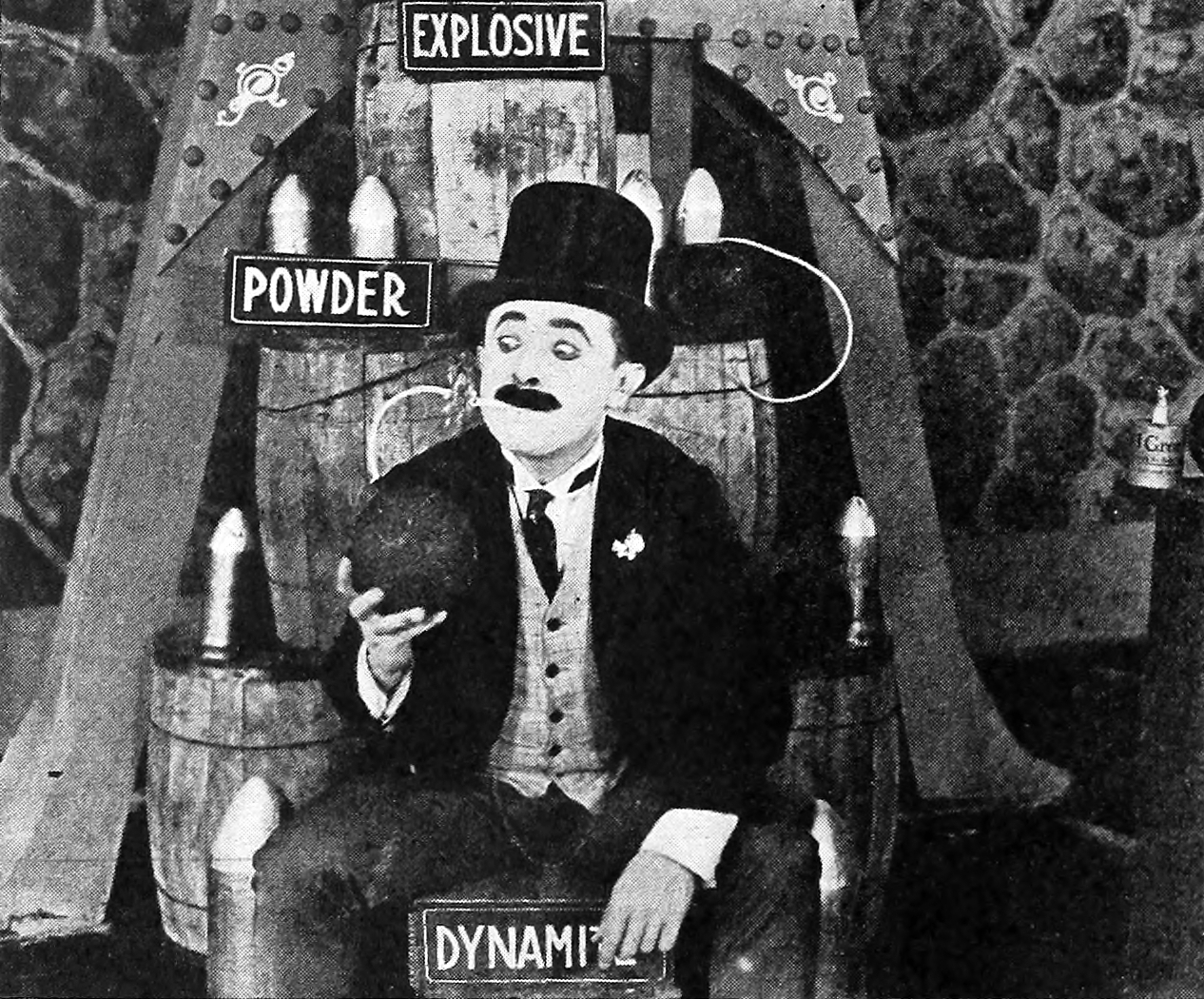
- Engle lights a cigarette with the fuse of a bomb
- Born: May 28, 1889; Austria
- Died: November 28, 1966 (aged 77); Hollywood, California, United States
- Occupation: Actor
- Years active: 1917–1957

Billy Engle (May 28, 1889 – November 28, 1966) was an Austro-Hungarian Empire-born American film actor. He appeared in more than 250 films between 1917 and 1957. He was born in the Austro-Hungarian Empire and died in Hollywood, California, from a heart attack.

Engle's stage debut occurred when he portrayed a cartoonist in Now and Then at Miner's Theater in New York City. He was a featured player with the Christie comedies.

== Partial filmography ==
- Special Delivery (1922) as Undetermined Secondary Role
- The Soilers (1923) as Prospector
- Scorching Sands (1923) as Undetermined Secondary Role
- Postage Due (1924) as Undetermined Secondary Role (Uncredited)
- Zeb vs. Paprika (1924) as Undetermined Secondary Role (Uncredited)
- Near Dublin (1924) as Villager (Uncredited)
- Rupert of Hee Haw (1924) as Short Officer
- Wide Open Spaces (1924) as Phil Sheridan
- What Happened to Jones (1926) as Milkman (Uncredited)
- Cruise of the Jasper B (1926) as Little Mover (Uncredited)
- Red Hot Leather (1926) as 'Dinkey' Hook
- The Western Whirlwind (1927) as 'Beans' Baker
- Ridin' for Justice (1932) as Sam the Stutterer
- Exposed (1932) as Undetermined Secondary Role
- It Happened One Night (1934) as Bus Passenger (Uncredited)
- The Gold Ghost (1934) as Short Miner (Uncredited)
- It's a Gift (1934) as Campground Patron (uncredited)
- Pop Goes the Easel (1935) as Storekeeper (Uncredited)
- Uncivil Warriors (1935) as Captain (Uncredited)
- Mrs. Miniver (1942) as Townsman (Uncredited)
- The Best Years of Our Lives (1946) as Customer (Uncredited)
- Flying Saucer Daffy (1958) as Auntie's boyfriend (Uncredited)
