= Ralph Ceder =

American film director (1897–1951)

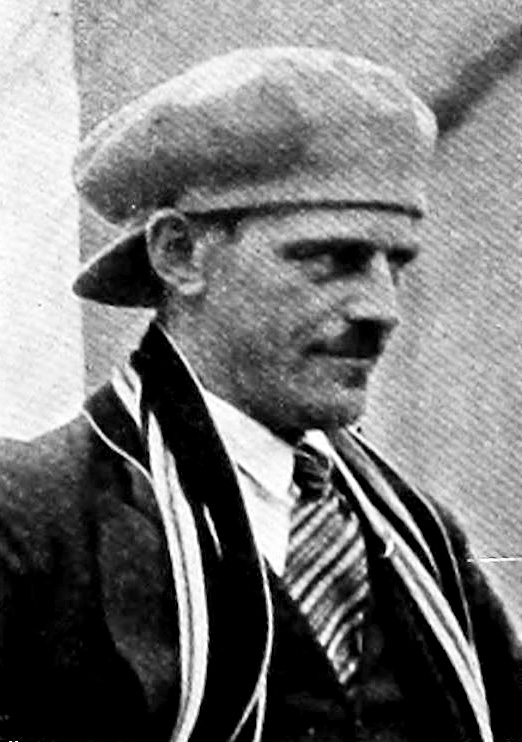
- From a 1926 magazine
- Born: February 2, 1897; Marinette, Wisconsin, US
- Died: November 29, 1951 (aged 53); Hollywood, California, US
- Occupations: Film director Screenwriter
- Years active: 1922–1940

Ralph Carl Ceder (February 2, 1897 – November 29, 1951) was an American film director and writer. He directed 88 films in the 1920s, 1930s, and 1940s.

== Life ==
Ceder was born on February 2, 1897, in Marinette, Wisconsin, to Eugene Martin Ceder (1865–1924) and Petrea Christina (Jensen) Ceder (1869–1946), immigrants from Sweden and Denmark. He married several times: to Molly Moore or Horowitz in 1918, to Elizabeth Mceacharn in 1926, and to Jacquetta Calvin in 1931. He died on November 29, 1951, at Rose Hospital in Los Angeles, California.

Ceder started making films in 1917, and he worked with Universal Studios and Paramount Pictures. He also directed for Mack Sennett. His film They All Fall was preserved by the Academy Film Archive in 2007.

== Selected filmography ==
- Roughest Africa (1923)
- The Whole Truth (1923)
- The Soilers (1923)
- Mother's Joy (1923)
- Zeb vs. Paprika (1924)
- Brothers Under the Chin (1924)
- Near Dublin (1924)
- The Joke's on You (1925)
- They All Fall (1925)
- Dumb Dicks (1931); short
- A Fool's Advice (1932)
- Guests Wanted (1932); short
- Strictly Illegal (1935)
- Captain Bill (1936)
