= The Soilers =

1923 film

- The Soilers
- Directed by: Ralph Ceder
- Written by: Hal Conklin; H. M. Walker
- Produced by: Broncho Billy Anderson; Hal Roach
- Starring: Stan Laurel; James Finlayson
- Cinematography: Frank Young
- Edited by: Thomas J. Crizer
- Production company: Hal Roach Studios
- Distributed by: Pathé Exchange
- Release date: November 25, 1923
- Running time: 20 minutes 9 minutes (remained cut)
- Country: United States
- Languages: Silent; English intertitles

The Soilers is a 1923 American silent comedy film starring Stan Laurel, and was released in the same year as the Western silent movie drama The Spoilers. The name of one character from the original, "McNamara", is parodied in the James Finlayson character.

== Cast ==
- Stan Laurel - Bob Canister
- Ena Gregory - The girl
- Mae Laurel - Woman in saloon
- James Finlayson - Smacknamara
- Billy Engle - Prospector
- Eddie Baker - Prospector
- George Rowe - Man in saloon
- Jack Ackroyd - Henchman
- Jack Gavin - Prospector
- Marvin Loback - Henchman
- Sammy Brooks
- Al Forbes
- Katherine Grant
- John B. O'Brien
- "Tonnage" Martin Wolfkeil

== See also ==
- List of American films of 1923
