= The Noon Whistle =

1923 film

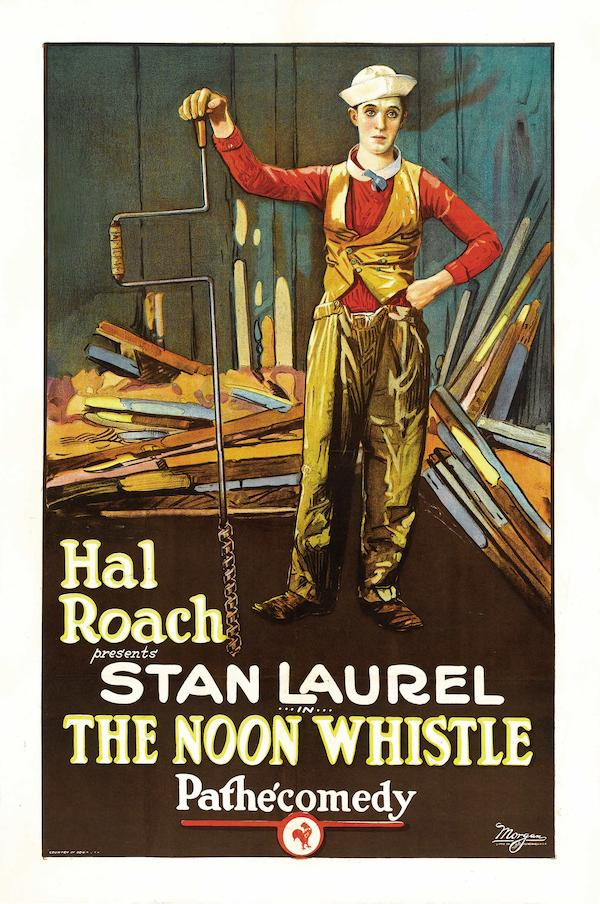
- Directed by: George Jeske
- Written by: Stan Laurel
- Produced by: Hal Roach
- Starring: Stan Laurel
- Cinematography: Frank Young
- Distributed by: Pathé Exchange
- Release date: April 29, 1923
- Running time: 11 minutes
- Country: United States
- Languages: Silent; English intertitles

The Noon Whistle is a 1923 American silent short comedy film starring Stan Laurel.

== Cast ==
- Stan Laurel as Tanglefoot
- James Finlayson as O'Hallahan, the foreman
- Katherine Grant as Secretary
- Sammy Brooks as A millworker (as Sam Brooks)
- William Gillespie as President of the lumber company
- Noah Young as A millworker
- John B. O'Brien as A millworker (as Jack O'Brien)

== See also ==
- List of American films of 1923
