= Smithy (1924 film) =

1924 film

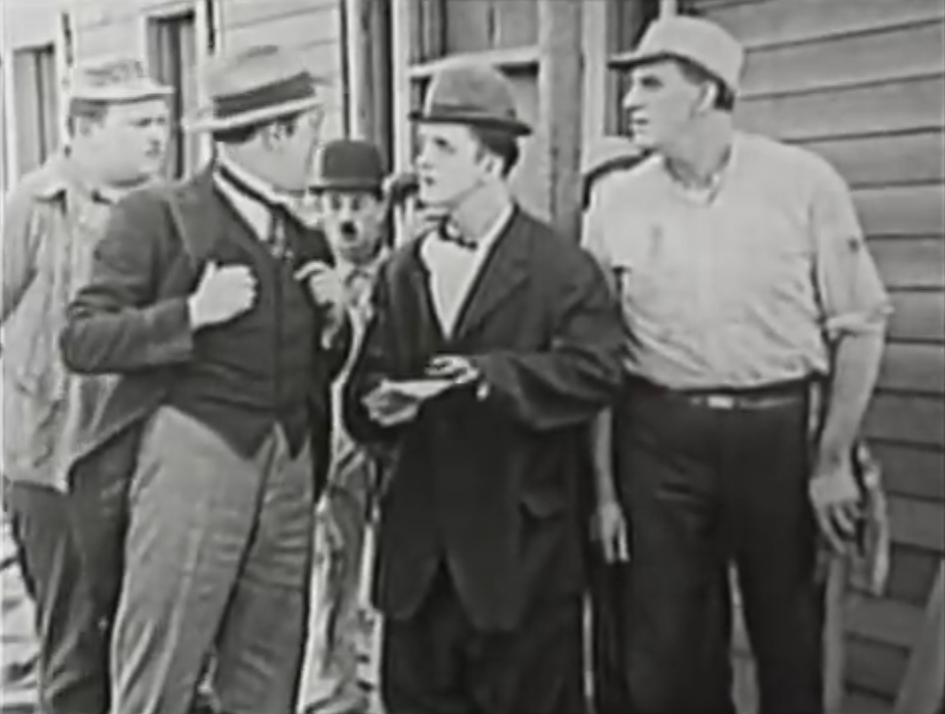
- (R to L) Jack Gavin, Stan Laurel, George Rowe, and William Gillespie in Smithy
- Directed by: George Jeske; Hal Roach
- Written by: H. M. Walker
- Produced by: Hal Roach
- Starring: Stan Laurel
- Cinematography: Frank Young
- Edited by: Thomas J. Crizer
- Release date: January 20, 1924
- Running time: 24 minutes
- Country: United States
- Languages: Silent film English intertitles

Smithy is a 1924 American silent film starring Stan Laurel. Prints of this film exist.

== Cast ==
- Stan Laurel - Smithy
- James Finlayson - Sergeant
- William Gillespie - The Boss
- Glenn Tryon - Mr. Smith
- Jack Ackroyd - (uncredited)
- Eddie Baker - (uncredited)
- Sammy Brooks - Man in Employment Line (uncredited)
- Jack Gavin - Foreman (uncredited)
- Ena Gregory - Secretary (uncredited)
- Charlie Hall - (uncredited)
- Fred Karno Jr. - Worker (uncredited)
- Marvin Loback - Worker (uncredited)
- George Rowe - Worker (uncredited)

== See also ==
- List of American films of 1924
