= Zeb vs. Paprika =

1924 film

- Directed by: Ralph Ceder
- Written by: Al Giebler
- Produced by: Hal Roach
- Starring: Stan Laurel
- Cinematography: Frank Young
- Edited by: Thomas J. Crizer
- Distributed by: Pathé Exchange
- Release date: March 16, 1924
- Running time: 20 minutes
- Country: United States
- Languages: Silent film English intertitles

Zeb vs. Paprika is a 1924 silent comedy film starring Stan Laurel. The film is a parody of the classic horse racing event on October 20, 1923, between American Kentucky Derby winner Zev and British Derby winner Papyrus, which attracted a crowd estimated at close to 50,000 people. It appears Dippy Donawho, Stan Laurel's character, wins a race against his American rival – until the two men learn they were riding each other's horses.

== Cast ==
- Stan Laurel as Dippy Donawho
- James Finlayson as His trainer
- Ena Gregory
- George Rowe as Rival jockey
- Eddie Baker as Stable hand
- Jack Ackroyd
- Mildred Booth
- Sammy Brooks
- Billy Engle
- Al Forbes
- Dick Gilbert
- William Gillespie
- Helen Gilmore
- Charlie Hall
- Fred Karno Jr.
- Charles Lloyd
- Earl Mohan
- John B. O'Brien
- Al Ochs
- Harry L. Rattenberry
- Noah Young
