= James Finlayson (actor) =

British actor (1887–1953)

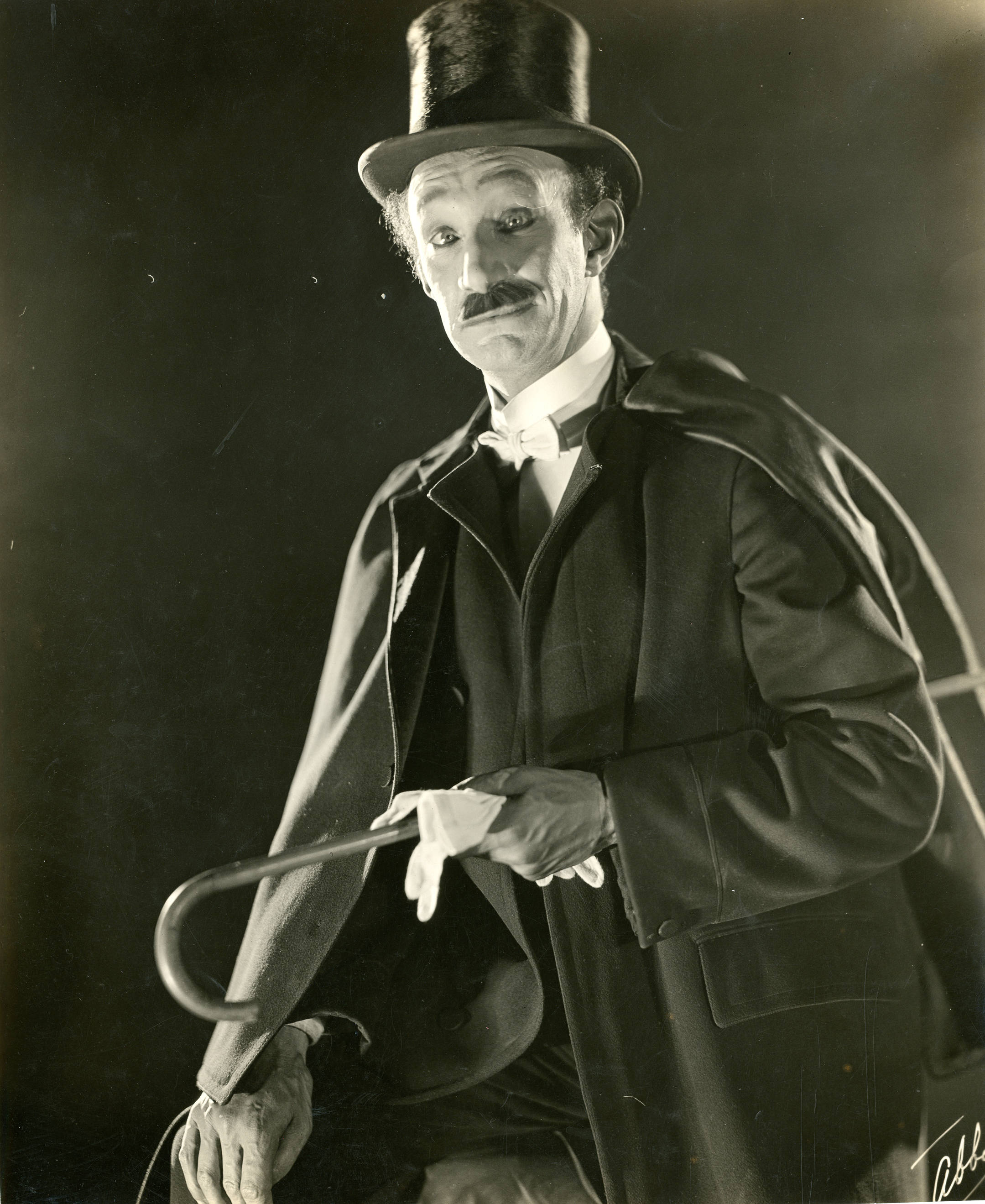
- Finlayson in 1923
- Born: James Henderson Finlayson; 27 August 1887; Larbert, Stirlingshire, Scotland
- Died: 9 October 1953 (aged 66); Los Angeles, California, US
- Occupations: Actor; comedian
- Years active: 1910–1951
- Spouse: Emily Cora Gilbert (m. 1919)

James Henderson Finlayson (27 August 1887 – 9 October 1953) was a Scottish actor who worked in both silent and sound comedies. Balding, with a fake moustache, he had many trademark comic mannerisms—including his squinting, outraged double-take reactions, and his characteristic exclamation: "D'ooooooh!" He is the best remembered comic foil of Laurel and Hardy.

Finlayson was known by a variety of nicknames. According to Laurel and Hardy scholar Randy Skretvedt, he "called himself Jimmy, was known around the lot as Jim and is usually referred to today as 'Fin'"—a truncated version of his surname, as author John McCabe also noted in his 1961 biography Mr. Laurel & Mr. Hardy.

== Early life and stage career ==
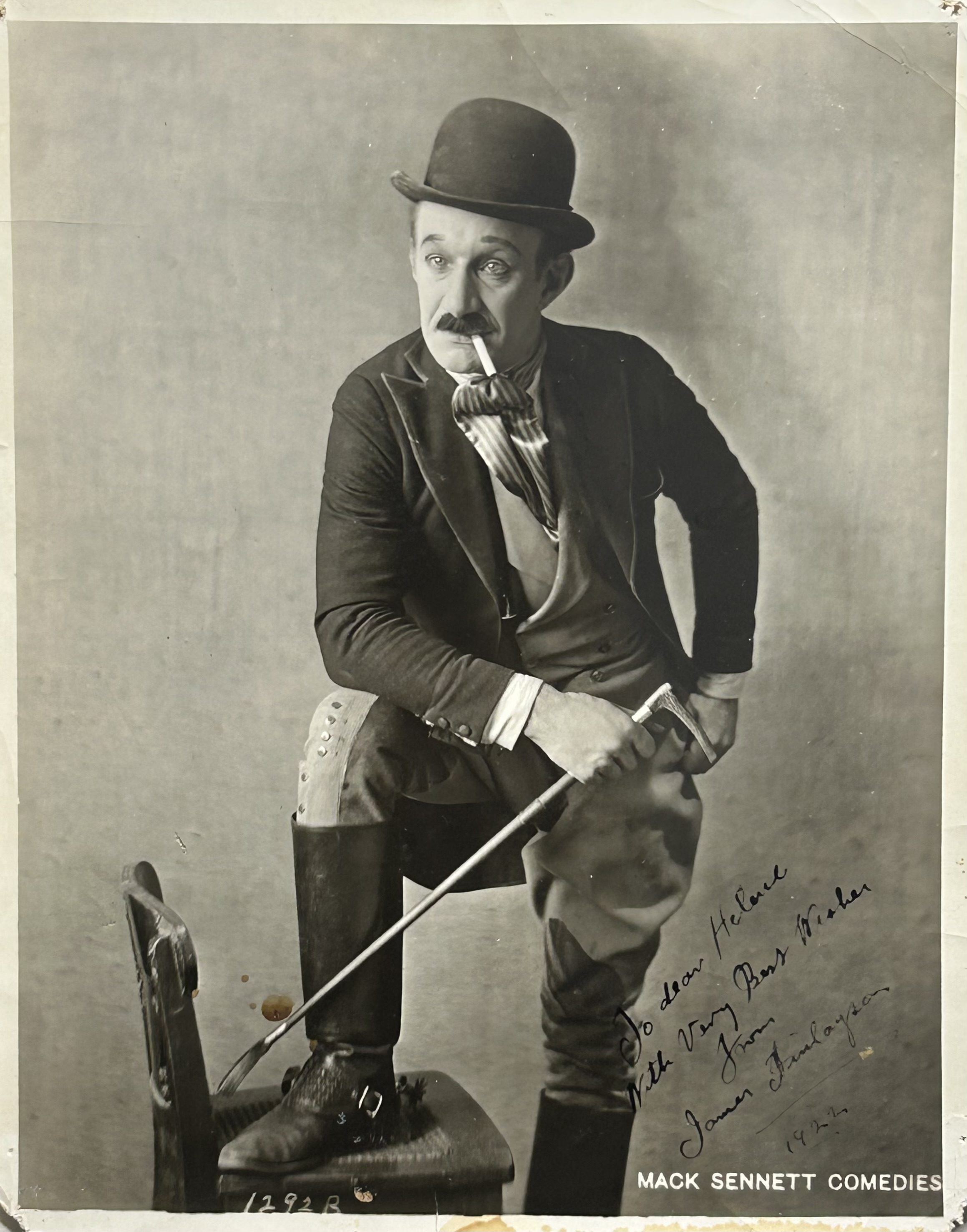
Photo Inscribed to Helene Chadwick

Born in Larbert, Stirlingshire, Scotland to Alexander and Isabella (née Henderson) Finlayson, James worked as a tinsmith before pursuing an acting career. As part of John Clyde's company, he played Jamie Ratcliffe in Jeanie Deans at the Theatre Royal in Edinburgh in 1910.

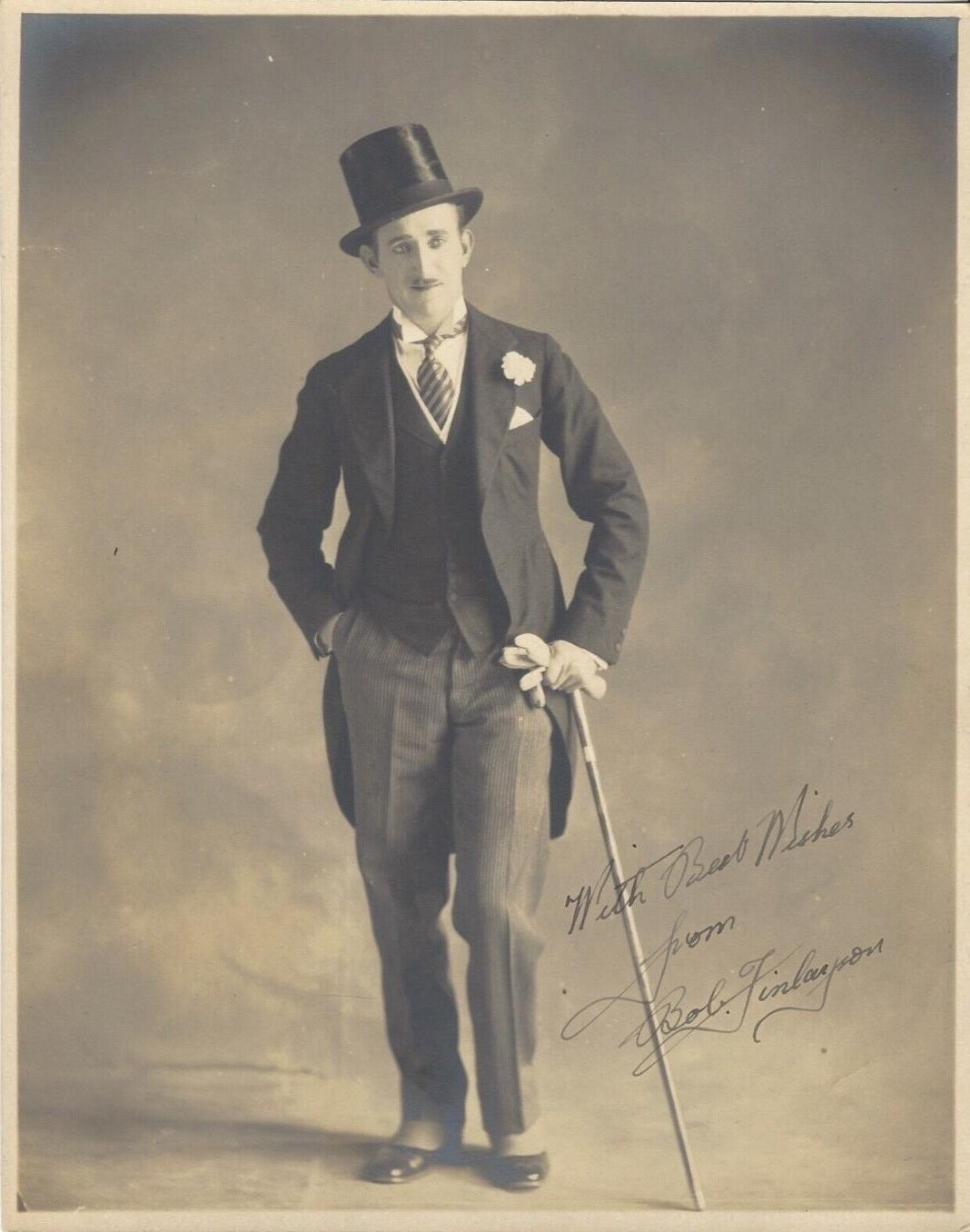
Robert Finlayson

The following year (1911), with both parents deceased, he emigrated at age 24 to the United States, along with his brother, Robert. In May 1912 in New York City, he played a detective disguised as a teuchter (person originating from the Scottish West Highlands or Western Isles) in the stage production The Great Game at Daly's Theatre: A reviewer in the Daily Mirror wrote: "Finlayson had an excellent opportunity, which he did not miss, for developing two characters in his one role—the simple, naive Scotsman and the artful, determined detective. The remarkable thing is that he managed to do them both at the same time."

Finlayson later won the role of Rab Biggar in the Broadway production of Bunty Pulls the Strings by Graham Moffat, then dropped out of a national tour in 1916 to pursue a career in Hollywood.

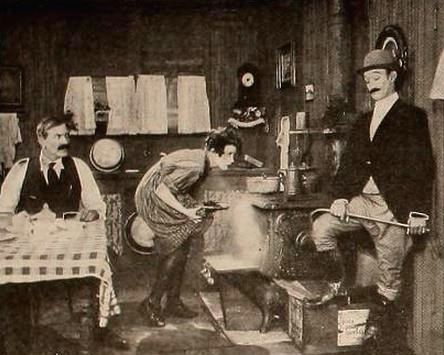
Film still from Down on the Farm (1920)

== Film ==
Arriving in Los Angeles in 1916, Finlayson found film work at L-KO and Thomas H. Ince's studio. In October 1919, he signed a contract with the Mack Sennett Comedies Corporation and appeared in numerous Sennett comedies, including with the Keystone Cops.

The promotional newspaper article for the 1920 premiere of Sennett's Down on the Farm refers to Finlayson as "legitimate and screen player of international celebrity", and of his performance says: "The villain in the case—a sort of cross between a Turkish Don Juan and a 'loan shark'—is played with rare power and comic results of seriousness by James Finlayson".

Finlayson sent to Scotland for his close friend Andy Clyde, urging him to join him at the Sennett studio. Clyde arrived in 1922 and became a Sennett fixture as a versatile character actor. Finlayson, however, did not establish himself as star material, and left Sennett's employ later that year.

=== Hal Roach Studios ===
Finlayson was hired almost immediately by Sennett's rival, Hal Roach, who gave him supporting roles in his studio's Snub Pollard and Stan Laurel comedies. With Roach's biggest short-subject star Harold Lloyd moving on to features, Roach tried to start new series with Charley Chase (successfully) and Finlayson (unsuccessfully). The next step came in 1927 when Roach's All-Star Comedy series gave Finlayson equal billing with up-and-coming co-stars Stan Laurel and Oliver Hardy, comedian Edna Marion, and others; some studio publicity even referred to Finlayson, Hardy, and Laurel as a "famous comedy trio." But Roach staff producer and future Academy Award director Leo McCarey recognized the great potential of a Laurel-and-Hardy pairing and began developing their characters and expanding their roles. By the autumn of 1928, Laurel and Hardy had their own starring series while the All-Star Comedy series soldiered on with other comedians. Nonetheless, Finlayson was still "considered by many to be an indispensable part of the Laurel & Hardy team."

Altogether, Finlayson had roles in 33 Laurel and Hardy films, usually as a villain or an antagonist, in such films as Big Business (1929) and Way Out West (1937). He also starred alongside Laurel in 19 films, and Hardy in five, before Laurel and Hardy were teamed. He appeared in dozens of Roach films with Charley Chase, Glenn Tryon, Snub Pollard and Ben Turpin, and in several Our Gang shorts, including Mush and Milk, in which he and Spanky McFarland match wits in a comically adversarial phone conversation.

Finlayson later played uncredited bit parts in films such as Foreign Correspondent (1940), To Be or Not to Be (1942), and Royal Wedding (1951). He was often called on for silent-comedy reunions like Hollywood Cavalcade (1939) and The Perils of Pauline (1947).

== Personal life and death ==
Finlayson married Emily Cora Gilbert, an American citizen from Iowa, in 1919 and became a US citizen in 1942.

English actress Stephanie Insall and Finlayson regularly took breakfast together. However, on the morning of 9 October 1953, Finlayson did not turn up at the usual time. Knowing he had recently been ill from flu, she went to his home where she discovered his body; he had died of a heart attack the night before. He was 66 years old.

== Legacy ==
One of Finlayson's trademarks was a comic drawn-out "Dohhhhhhh!" response to frustration or insult. He had used the term as a minced oath to stand in for the word "damn", unacceptable at the time. A half-century later, it inspired Dan Castellaneta, the voice actor of Homer Simpson. During the voice recording session for a Tracey Ullman Show short, Castellaneta was required to utter what was written in the script as an "annoyed grunt". He rendered it as a drawn out "Dohhhhhhh!" Matt Groening felt it would better suit the timing of animation if it were spoken faster, so Castellaneta shortened it to a quickly uttered "D'oh!"

=== Accolades ===
In 1996, as part its celebrations of a century of cinema in Scotland, the Scottish Film Council presented a plaque commemorating James to Falkirk Council. It reads: "James (Jimmie) Finlayson. Outstanding comic screen actor. The foil to Laurel and Hardy in many films. Born in Larbert in 1887". The plaque was initially erected in Falkirk Town Hall, but was subsequently displayed in Bo'ness Library as part of the HippFest 2019 silent film festival.

In 2011 "Jimmy Finlayson" was incorporated into the Catchphrases section of the Comedy Carpet mosaic beside Blackpool Tower along with a "D'OH!" embossed star.

In 2019, Finlayson was ranked number 39 in a list of Scotland's funniest 60 people compiled by The Herald in a feature trailing the Glasgow International Comedy Festival.

In 2025, James was honoured in his home town of Larbert when a portrait of him by local artist Connor Draycott was unveiled at the Dobbie Hall. The Scottish Film Council plaque from 1996 was also relocated there.

=== Portrayals ===
Finlayson is one of the many entertainers portrayed by English actor Timothy Spall in the 2018 film Stanley: a Man of Variety.

In the 2018 Laurel and Hardy biopic Stan & Ollie, Finlayson is portrayed on the set of Way Out West by Scottish actor Keith MacPherson.

=== Sons of the Desert Tent ===
An international "tent" (chapter) of the Sons of the Desert fraternity was formed in Glasgow in 2019 by and for relatives of Finlayson, and named Our Relations after the Laurel and Hardy film in which Finlayson co-starred.

== Filmography ==
Year	Title	Role	Notes
1920	Down on the Farm	The Sportive Banker with Mortgage	produced by Mack Sennett
1920	Married Life	Man Who Made Good	
1920	Love, Honor and Behave	Artist	
1921	A Small Town Idol	J. Wellington Jones	Mack Sennett Comedies; with Ben Turpin
1921	Home Talent	Stranded Actor	
1922	The Crossroads of New York	Lawyer	
1923	The Noon Whistle	O'Hallahan, the foreman	Short, Hal Roach Studios; with Stan Laurel
1923	White Wings	Dental patient	Short, Hal Roach Studios; with Stan Laurel
1923	Pick and Shovel	The foreman	Short, Hal Roach Studios; with Stan Laurel
1923	Oranges and Lemons	Worker	Short, Uncredited, Hal Roach Studios; with Stan Laurel
1923	Hollywood	Himself	Paramount Pictures
1923	A Man About Town	Humko, store detective	Short, Hal Roach Studios; with Stan Laurel
1923	Roughest Africa	Lt. Hans Downe (Little Boss)	Short, Hal Roach Studios; with Stan Laurel
1923	Frozen Hearts	General Sappovitch	Short, Hal Roach Studios; with Stan Laurel
1923	The Whole Truth	Defense lawyer	Short, Hal Roach Studios; with Stan Laurel
1923	The Soilers	Smacknamara	Short, Hal Roach Studios; with Stan Laurel
1923	Scorching Sands	James	Short, Hal Roach Studios; with Stan Laurel
1923	Mother's Joy	Baron Buttontop	Short, Hal Roach Studios; with Stan Laurel
1924	Smithy	Sergeant	Short, Hal Roach Studios; with Stan Laurel
1924	Postage Due	Postal inspector	Short, Hal Roach Studios; with Stan Laurel
1924	Zeb vs. Paprika	Trainer	Short, Hal Roach Studios; with Stan Laurel
1924	Brothers Under the Chin		Short, Hal Roach Studios; with Stan Laurel
1924	Wide Open Spaces	Jack McQueen	Short, Hal Roach Studios; with Stan Laurel
1924	Rupert of Hee Haw	Rupert of Hee Haw	Short, Hal Roach Studios; with Stan Laurel
1924	Our Congressman	Dinner Party Guest	Short, Uncredited, Hal Roach Studios
1924	Short Kilts	McGregor's son	Short, Hal Roach Studios; with Stan Laurel
1924	Near Dublin	Brick merchant	Short, Hal Roach Studios; with Stan Laurel
1925	The Haunted Honeymoon		Short, Hal Roach Studios
1925	Innocent Husbands	The Desk Clerk	Short, Hal Roach Studios; with Charley Chase
1925	Welcome Home	Minor Role	
1925	Yes, Yes, Nanette	Hillory, the new husband	Short, Hal Roach Studios; with Oliver Hardy
1926	Madame Mystery	Struggling author	Short, Hal Roach Studios; with Theda Bara
1926	Dizzy Daddies	Jonathan Haig	Short, Hal Roach Studios
1926	Wife Tamers	Waiter	Short, Hal Roach Studios. with Lionel Barrymore and Gertrude Astor
1926	Ukulele Sheiks		Short, Hal Roach Studios; with Glenn Tryon and Vivien Oakland
1926	Thundering Fleas	Justice of the Peace	Short, Hal Roach Studios; with Oliver Hardy and Charley Chase
1926	Raggedy Rose	Simpson Sniffle	Hal Roach Studios; with Mabel Normand
1927	Seeing the World	James Finlayson, teacher	Short, Hal Roach Studios; Our Gang series
1927	One Hour Married		Short, Hal Roach Studios; with Mabel Normand
1927	The Honorable Mr. Buggs		Short, Hal Roach Studios; with Oliver Hardy
1927	The Second Hundred Years	Gov. Browne Van Dyke	Short, Hal Roach Studios; with Laurel and Hardy
1927	No Man's Law	Jack Belcher	Hal Roach Studios; with Oliver Hardy
1927	Love 'em and Weep	Titus Tilbury	Short, Hal Roach Studios; with Laurel and Hardy
1927	With Love and Hisses	Captain Bustle	Short, Hal Roach Studios; with Laurel and Hardy
1927	Do Detectives Think?	Judge Foozle	Short, Hal Roach Studios; with Laurel and Hardy
1928	Bachelor's Paradise	Pat Malone	Tiffany Pictures
1928	Ladies' Night in a Turkish Bath	Pa Slocum	First National Pictures
1928	Lady Be Good	Trelawney West	First National Pictures
1928	Show Girl	Mr. Dugan	First National Pictures
1929	Liberty	Store Keeper	Short, Hal Roach Studios; with Laurel and Hardy
1929	Big Business	Homeowner	Short, Hal Roach Studios; with Laurel and Hardy
1929	Two Weeks Off	Pa Weaver	
1929	Hard to Get	Pa Martin	First National Pictures
1929	Wall Street	Andy	
1930	Night Owls	Meadows, the butler	Short, Hal Roach Studios; with Laurel and Hardy
1930	Young Eagles	Scotty	
1930	The Dawn Patrol	Field Sergeant	
1930	For the Defense	Parrott	
1930	El príncipe del dólar		
1930	Chercheuses d'or		
1930	Feet First	Painter	Uncredited
1930	Another Fine Mess	Colonel Buckshot	Short, Uncredited, Hal Roach Studios; with Laurel and Hardy
1931	Chickens Come Home	Butler	Short, Uncredited, Hal Roach Studios; with Laurel and Hardy
1931	Politiquerías	Criado	
1931	Our Wife	Father of Dulce	Short, Uncredited, Hal Roach Studios; with Laurel and Hardy
1931	Pardon Us	Teacher	Hal Roach Studios; with Laurel and Hardy
1931	One Good Turn	A Community Player	Short, Hal Roach Studios; with Laurel and Hardy
1931	Hasty Marriage	Kitty's Father	Short, Hal Roach Studios; with Charley Chase
1932	The Chimp	Ringmaster	Short, Hal Roach Studios; with Laurel and Hardy
1932	Thunder Below	Scotty	
1932	Pack Up Your Troubles	The General	Hal Roach Studios; with Laurel and Hardy
Zwei Ritter ohne Furcht und Tadel	1 Short		
1933	Me and My Pal	Peter Cucumber	Short, Hal Roach Studios; with Laurel and Hardy
1933	His Silent Racket	Himself	Short, Hal Roach Studios; with Charley Chase
1933	Fra Diavolo	Lord Rocberg	Hal Roach Studios; with Laurel and Hardy
1933	Mush and Milk	Mr. Brown, the banker	Short, Hal Roach Studios; with Our Gang
1934	Trouble in Store	The Watchman (leading role)	(U.K Comedy Short), Warner Brothers
1934	The Girl in Possession	Minor Role	Uncredited
1934	Oh No Doctor!	Axminster	
1934	Dick Turpin	Jeremy	
1934	Nine Forty-Five	Police Constable Doyle	
1934	What Happened to Harkness?	Police Constable Gallun	
1934	Father and Son	Bildad	
1934	Big Business	Police Constable	
1935	Thicker Than Water	Mr. Finlayson	Short, Hal Roach Studios; with Laurel and Hardy
1935	Handle with Care	Jimmy	
1935	Who's Your Father		Uncredited
1935	Bonnie Scotland	Sergeant Major Finlayson	Hal Roach Studios; with Laurel and Hardy
1935	Manhattan Monkey Business	Joyce's Father	Short, Hal Roach Studios; with Charley Chase
1935	Life Hesitates at 40	Dr. Finlayson	Short, Hal Roach Studios; with Charley Chase
1936	The Bohemian Girl	Finn, Captain of the Guard	Hal Roach Studios; with Laurel and Hardy
1936	Our Relations	Finn, Chief Engineer	Hal Roach Studios; with Laurel and Hardy
1937	Way Out West	Mickey Finn	Hal Roach Studios; with Laurel and Hardy
1937	Pick a Star	Director	Metro-Goldwyn-Mayer
1937	The Toast of New York	Trick-Hat Inventor	Uncredited
1937	All Over Town	MacDougal	
1937	This Way Please	Policeman	Uncredited
1937	Angel	Barker's Second Butler	Uncredited
1937	Wise Girl	Jailer	Uncredited, RKO Radio
1938	Block-Heads	Finn - Man on Stairs	Hal Roach Studios; with Laurel and Hardy
1938	Carefree	Man on golf course	Uncredited, RKO Pictures; with Fred Astaire and Ginger Rogers
1939	Hollywood Cavalcade	Himself	20th Century Fox
1939	The Flying Deuces	Jailer	RKO Pictures; with Laurel and Hardy
1939	Raffles	Hansom Cab Driver	Uncredited, United Artists
1939	The Great Victor Herbert	Lamplighter	
1939	A Chump at Oxford	Baldy Vandevere	Hal Roach Studios; with Laurel and Hardy
1940	Saps at Sea	Dr J.H. Finlayson	Hal Roach Studios; with Laurel and Hardy
1940	Foreign Correspondent	Dutch Peasant	Uncredited, United Artists
1941	Nice Girl?	Loafer at Train Station	Uncredited
1941	One Night in Lisbon	Air Raid Warden	Uncredited
1941	New Wine	Minor Role	Uncredited
1942	To Be or Not to Be	Scottish Farmer	Uncredited, United Artists
1942	Yanks Ahoy	Cook Flynn	Uncredited
1946	Two Sisters from Boston	Street Cleaner	Uncredited
1946	She-Wolf of London	Constable With Hobbs and Latham	Uncredited
1946	Till the Clouds Roll By	Candy Vendor	Uncredited
1947	Thunder in the Valley	Court Judge	Uncredited
1947	The Perils of Pauline	Comic Chef	Paramount Pictures
1948	Julia Misbehaves	Bill Collector	Uncredited, Metro-Goldwyn-Mayer
1948	Grand Canyon Trail	Sheriff	
1948	Hills of Home	Minor Role	Uncredited
1949	Challenge to Lassie	Newspaper Reporter	Uncredited, Metro-Goldwyn-Mayer
1951	Here Comes the Groom	Drunken Sailor / Wedding Guest	Uncredited, Paramount Pictures
1951	Royal Wedding	Cabby	Uncredited, Metro-Goldwyn-Mayer
