= Kill or Cure (1923 film) =

1923 film

- Directed by: Scott Pembroke
- Produced by: Hal Roach
- Starring: Stan Laurel
- Cinematography: Frank Young
- Release date: July 15, 1923
- Running time: 14 minutes
- Country: United States
- Languages: Silent film English intertitles

Kill or Cure is a 1923 American silent film featuring Stan Laurel. Prints of the film survive. It was directed by Scott Pembroke.

== Plot ==
An unfortunate salesman tries to sell his Professor I.O. Dine's Knox-All medicine, which 'can be used for coughs, colds, toothache, furniture polish, after shaving, flea exterminator, baldness, grease spots, machine oiler, hair bleacher, etc.'.

== Cast ==
- Stan Laurel as Door to door salesman
- Katherine Grant as Maid with bird cage
- Noah Young as Car owner
- Eddie Baker as Sheriff
- Mark Jones as Speedy Sam
- Helen Gilmore as Aggressive non-customer
- George Rowe as Deaf man
- Sammy Brooks as Short non-customer
