= Postage Due =

1924 film

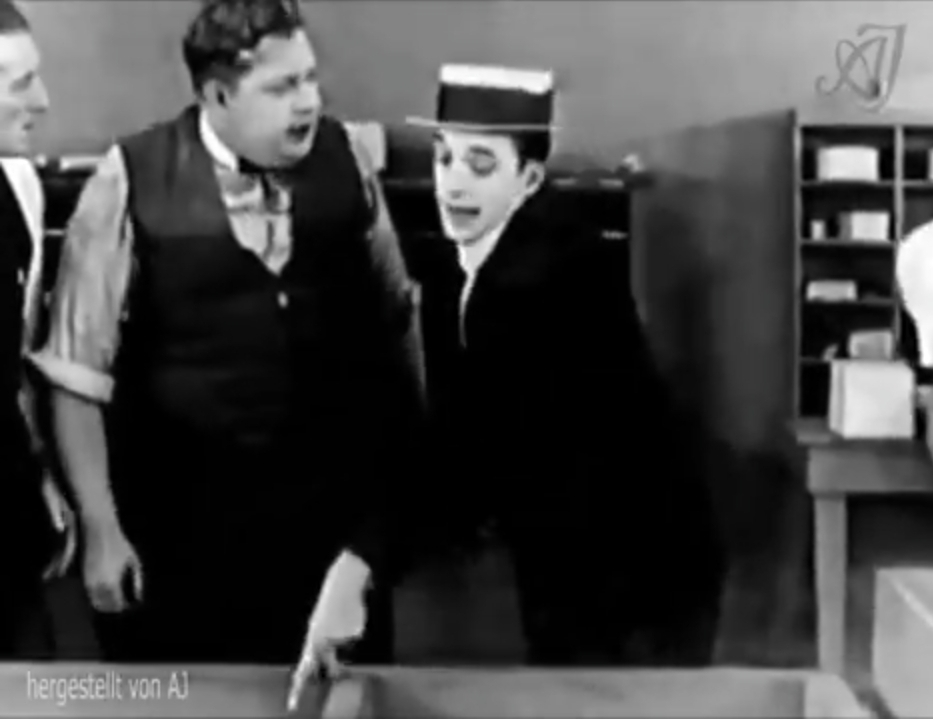
- Stan Laurel (right) with Martin Wolfkeil
- Directed by: George Jeske
- Written by: Hal Conklin
- Produced by: Hal Roach
- Starring: Stan Laurel
- Cinematography: Frank Young
- Edited by: Thomas J. Crizer
- Distributed by: Pathé Exchange
- Release date: February 17, 1924
- Running time: 20 minutes
- Country: United States
- Languages: Silent film English intertitles

Postage Due is a 1924 American silent comedy film starring Stan Laurel. A print of this film exists.

== Cast ==
- Stan Laurel – Stan
- James Finlayson – Postal inspector
- George Rowe – Photographer
- Ena Gregory – Model
- Eddie Baker – Villain
- Dick Gilbert – Villain
- 'Tonnage' Martin Wolfkeil – Postal worker
- Jack Ackroyd – Sleeping customer
- William Gillespie – C.W. Lyons, chief postal inspector
- Charlie Hall – Customer
- Mildred Booth
- Sammy Brooks
- Billy Engle
- Al Forbes
- Helen Gilmore
- Fred Karno Jr.
- John B. O'Brien
- Al Ochs

== See also ==
- List of American films of 1924
