= Nuts in May (film) =

- Directed by: Robin Williamson
- Produced by: Isadore Bernstein
- Starring: Stan Laurel
- Cinematography: Harry M. Fowler
- Release date: 1917
- Running time: 30 minutes
- Country: United States
- Languages: Silent film English intertitles

Nuts in May (1917) is a silent comedy short, directed by Robin Williamson (director), produced by Isadore Bernstein, and featuring Stan Laurel, billed as Stan Jefferson, in his onscreen debut.

The short was filmed at Bernstein Studios, in Hollywood, California. "A fragment" of the film survives (a little over 60 seconds).

== Plot ==
Stan plays a resident of "Home for the Weak-Minded", apparently a lunatic asylum. Stan's particular delusion is that he thinks he's Napoleon. Stan walks the grounds of the cuckoo-hatch sticking his right hand into his shirt and wearing a Napoleon hat. He thinks he's Napoleon, but he gives the salute of the British army.

Stan has his own personal keeper in the asylum: a taller moustached man who wears a kepi so that Stan will think he's a French officer.

Stan gets out and finds some local boys, who eagerly join him in playing soldier. Stan's kepi-wearing keeper pursues him through the film. Stan hijacks a steamroller, and Stan nearly runs down some workers in a road crew.

The surviving footage consists of Stan in various scrapes with a steamroller, ending with him in a straw boater being dragged off to the asylum.

== Cast ==
- Stan Laurel as Mental Patient (as Stan Jefferson)
- Mae Dahlberg
- Lucille Arnold
- Owen Evans
- Charles Arling

== See also ==
- List of incomplete or partially lost films
- Mixed Nuts (1922), a film using footage from Nuts in May
