= Brothers Under the Chin =

1924 film

- Directed by: Ralph Ceder
- Written by: Hal Conklin; Al Giebler; H. M. Walker
- Produced by: Hal Roach
- Starring: Stan Laurel
- Cinematography: Frank Young
- Edited by: Thomas J. Crizer
- Distributed by: Pathé Exchange
- Release date: April 13, 1924
- Running time: 20 minutes
- Country: United States
- Languages: Silent film English intertitles

Brothers Under the Chin is a 1924 American silent comedy film starring Stan Laurel and featuring James Finlayson.

== Cast ==
- Stan Laurel
- Ena Gregory
- James Finlayson
- Noah Young
- William Gillespie
- Sammy Brooks
- Jack Ackroyd
- Eddie Baker
- Fred Karno Jr.
- John B. O'Brien

== See also ==
- List of American films of 1924
