= Mixed Nuts (1922 film) =

1922 film

- Directed by: James Parrott; Robin Williamson (uncredited)
- Written by: Jean DuBois
- Produced by: Samuel Bischoff
- Starring: Stan Laurel
- Edited by: Jean DuBois
- Distributed by: Samuel Bischoff Productions
- Release date: 1922
- Running time: 2 reels (600 m)
- Country: United States
- Language: Silent with English intertitles

Mixed Nuts is a 1922 American black-and-white silent film starring Stan Laurel. The film is a two-reeler (600m.) comedy short. The film was created by re-cutting an earlier film, Nuts in May (1917), adding footage and outtakes from another movie, The Pest (1922), and filming new (primarily bridging) sequences, in order to combine the diverse contributing elements into a complete, coherent narrative.

== Cast ==
- Stan Laurel as Book salesman
- Max Asher as Doctor
- Dave Morris as Drunk

== See also ==
- List of American films of 1922
