= Collars and Cuffs =

1923 film

- Directed by: George Jeske
- Produced by: Hal Roach
- Starring: Stan Laurel
- Cinematography: Frank Young
- Production company: Hal Roach Studios
- Distributed by: Pathé Exchange
- Release date: July 1, 1923
- Running time: 10 minutes
- Country: United States
- Languages: Silent film English intertitles

Collars and Cuffs is a 1923 American silent comedy film starring Stan Laurel.

== Cast ==
- Stan Laurel as Laundry worker
- Mark Jones as Foreman
- Eddie Baker as Laundry worker
- Katherine Grant as Laundry worker
- Jack Ackroyd as Laundry worker
- George Rowe as Pedestrian
- Sammy Brooks as Laundry worker

== See also ==
- List of American films of 1923
