= White Wings (1923 film) =

1923 film

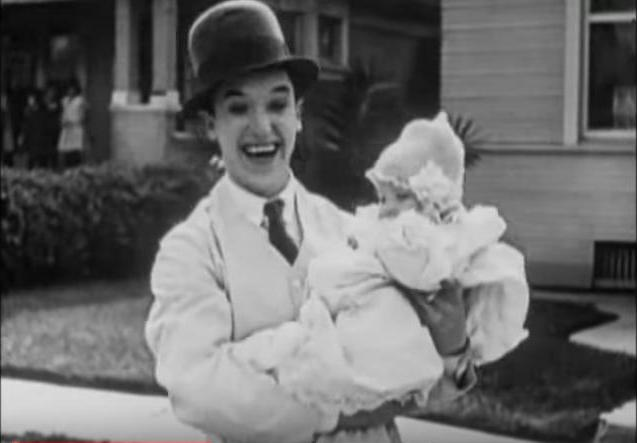
- Directed by: George Jeske
- Produced by: Hal Roach
- Starring: Stan Laurel
- Cinematography: Frank Young
- Distributed by: Pathé Exchange
- Release date: May 13, 1923
- Running time: 11 minutes
- Country: United States
- Languages: Silent; English intertitles

White Wings is a 1923 American silent short comedy film starring Stan Laurel.

== Cast ==
- Stan Laurel – Street cleaner
- James Finlayson – Dental patient
- Marvin Loback – A cop
- Katherine Grant – Nurse
- Mark Jones – Dental patient
- George Rowe – Cross-eyed man with dime
- William Gillespie

== See also ==
- List of American films of 1923
