= Hal Roach Studios =

American film production studio

Hal Roach Studios, Inc.
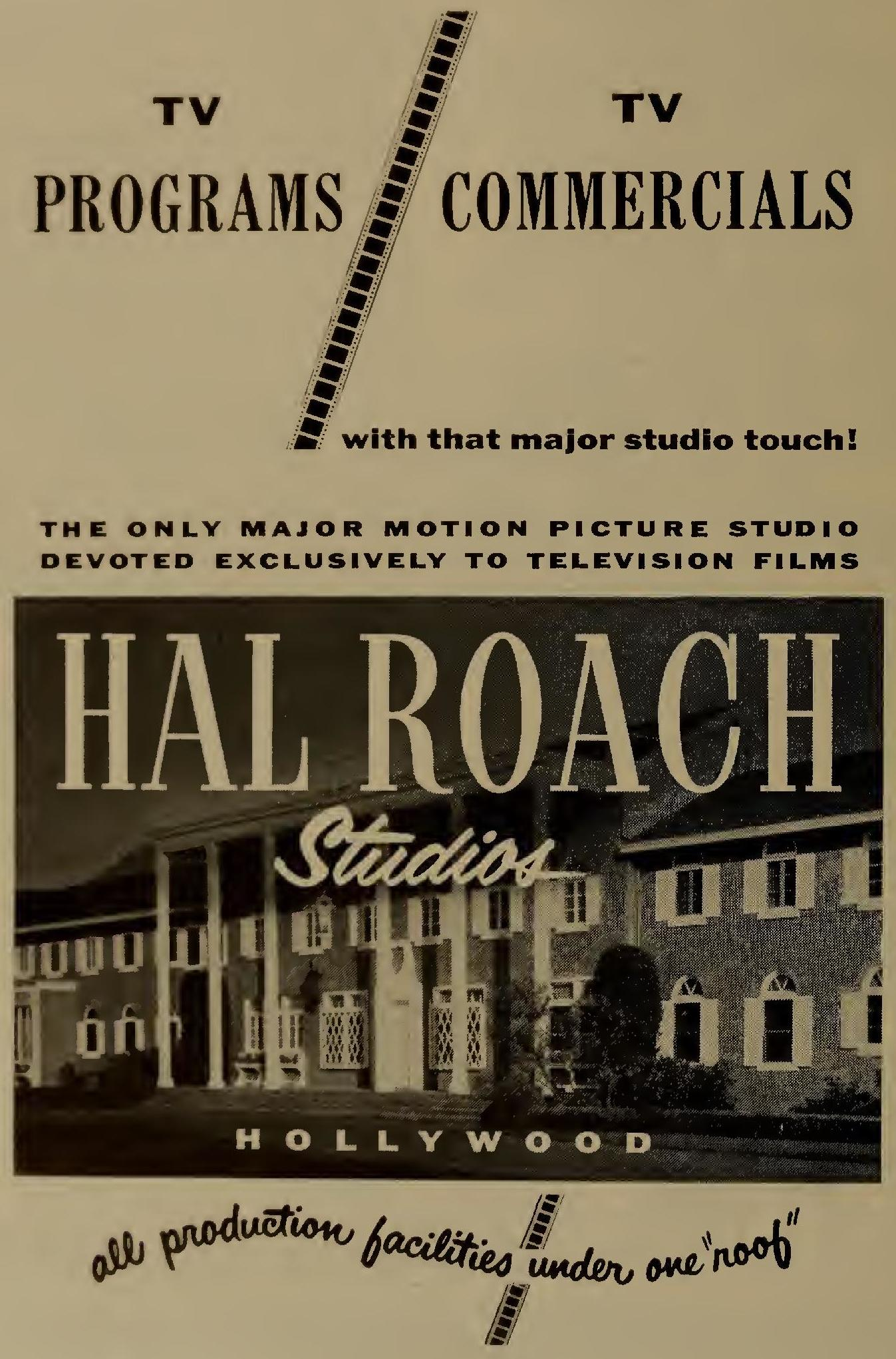
- Company type: Subsidiary
- Industry: Cinema; Television
- Founded: July 23, 1914; 111 years ago
- Founders: Hal Roach, Sr.; Dan Linthicum; I.H. Nance
- Defunct: 1961; 65 years ago
- Fate: Absorbed into Halcyon Studios
- Headquarters: Culver City, California, United States
- Products: TV shows Theatrical feature films TV movies Theatrical short films
- Parent: Scranton Lace Company (1958-1960); RHI Entertainment (1985-1988)
- Subsidiaries: Hal Roach Television Corporation

Hal Roach Studios was an American motion picture and, through its TV production subsidiary, Hal Roach Television Corporation, television production studio. Known as The Laugh Factory to the World, it was founded by producer Hal Roach and business partners Dan Linthicum and I.H. Nance as the Rolin Film Company on July 23, 1914. The studio lot, at 8822 Washington Boulevard in Culver City, California, United States, was built in 1920, at which time Rolin was renamed to Hal E. Roach Studios. The first series in Hal Roach Studios were the Willie Work comedies, with the first short being Willie Runs the Park.

== History ==
Roach saw significant success in the 1920s with series of short comedy films featuring stars such as Harold Lloyd, Snub Pollard, and the Our Gang kids. The studio produced both short films and features for distribution through Pathé Exchange until 1927, when it signed a new distribution deal with Metro-Goldwyn-Mayer. By the early 1930s, the studio had entered a golden age, with a line-up of many of film's most popular comedians, including Laurel and Hardy, Charley Chase, Our Gang, Thelma Todd, and Zasu Pitts.

As movie theaters began to favor double features over single-feature programs with added short films—Roach's specialty—the studio's focus shifted from shorts to features, such as Topper and Laurel and Hardy's Way Out West (both 1937).

In 1938, the studios began distributing its titles through United Artists, selling the Our Gang short film unit to MGM.

In the early 1940s, Roach began producing "streamliner" features—shorter films running 40–50 minutes, intended for exhibition as B movies.

From 1942 to 1945, the studio was leased to the First Motion Picture Unit for the production of training and propaganda films, primarily for the Army Air Forces. The studio was nicknamed "Fort Hal Roach".

From 1943, Roach licensed revivals of his sound-era productions for theatrical and home-movie distribution.

Following the War, Roach became the first Hollywood producer to go to an all-color production schedule, making four streamliners in Cinecolor.

With the television boom of the late 1940s, Roach shifted to TV production with Hal Roach Television Corporation and produced Fireside Theatre, Amos 'n' Andy, The Public Defender, The Life of Riley and The Stu Erwin Show.

In April 1959, the studio was closed due to bankruptcy under the management of Roach's son Hal Roach Jr. Hal Sr. returned to try to resurrect it; but by December 1962, the lot was permanently closed. In August 1963, the lot was demolished after several auctions and sales of the company's assets.

Hal Roach Jr. died of pneumonia in 1972. Hal Sr. sold his interest in Hal Roach Studios to a Canadian investment group in 1971; he died in 1992. As a corporate entity, Hal Roach Studios survived into the 1980s, managing the rights to its catalog, primarily the Laurel and Hardy films, and sporadic new productions such as Kids Incorporated.

It also became a pioneer in digital film colorization, purchasing a 50% interest in pioneering company Colorization, Inc.

Through Colorization, Inc., Hal Roach Studios produced colorized versions of classic black-and-white Roach films, beginning with Topper and Way Out West, and became the first studio to distribute colorized films in 1985. Roach's Colorization, Inc. colorized films from other studios as well. On July 17, 1986, Hal Roach Studios inked an agreement with film production company Otto Preminger Films to colorize four black-and-white Otto Preminger movies for television syndication.

On August 8, 1986, Hal Roach Studios and Robert Halmi, Inc. partnered with book publisher Grolier to set up a home video arm, Grolier Home Video, to produce adaptations of Grolier's book properties. In 1986, the company made an offer to buy Rastar Productions, but it was turned down in 1987.

The company was gradually acquired from 1985 to 1988 by RHI Entertainment. The company had completed the merger by 1987. Australian financial company Qintex joined the board, a prelude to their full takeover of the company by 1988.
