= One Stolen Night =

One Stolen Night may refer to:

- One Stolen Night (1923 film), an American silent drama film
- One Stolen Night (1929 film), an American part-talkie adventure crime film
