= Craig Hutchison =

Craig Hutchison may refer to:

- Craig Hutchison (broadcaster) (born 1974), Australian sports broadcaster
- Craig Hutchison (swimmer) (born 1975), Canadian freestyle swimmer

== See also ==
- Craig Hutchinson (1891–1976), American director and screenwriter
