= Hello Trouble =

Hello Trouble may refer to:

- "Hello Trouble" (song), a song by Orville Couch, and by the Desert Rose Band
- Hello Trouble (1918 film), an American silent comedy film
- Hello Trouble (1932 film), an American Western film
