= Brownie, the Peacemaker =

- Selections from the film
- Directed by: W. Taylor
- Starring: Brownie The Wonder Dog; Phil Dunham; Merta Sterling; Jessie Fox; Chai Hong
- Production company: Century Film Company
- Distributed by: Universal Film Manufacturing Company
- Release date: September 1920
- Running time: 2 reels
- Country: United States
- Language: English

Brownie The Peacemaker is a 1920 American silent short film directed by W. Taylor for the Century Film Company. The film starred Brownie The Wonder Dog, Phil Dunham, Merta Sterling, Jessie Fox, and Chai Hong. The film made its theatrical debut in September 1920.

== Plot ==
A woman comes to believe that her pet dog is actually the reincarnation of her recently deceased husband.

== Production and distribution ==
The film was produced by the Century Film Company, which was founded in 1917 by Julius and Abe Stern. The Century Film Company was best known for producing short films centered around child and animal stars, such as Baby Peggy, and Joe Martin the orangutan. The company ceased making films around 1929. The Film was distributed by the Universal Film Manufacturing Company.

== Preservation ==
For many decades, Brownie The Peacemaker was considered a lost film. In June 2023, a badly damaged, but still viewable fragment of the film was discovered. It was subsequently digitized and uploaded to YouTube. No complete prints of the film are known to exist.
