= Otto Fries =

American actor (1887–1938)

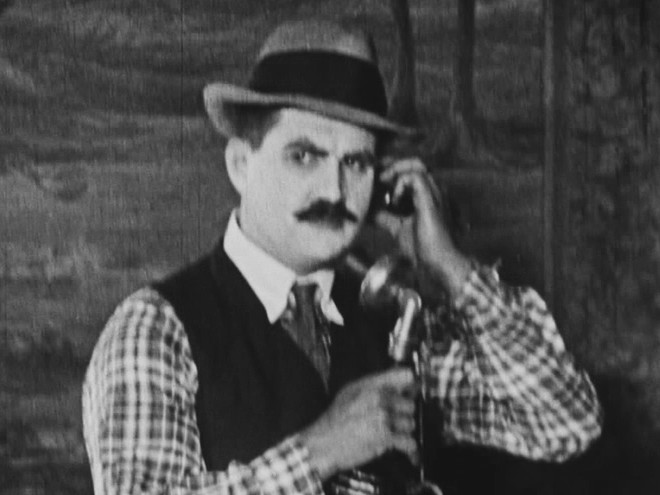
- Fries in The Weak-End Party (1922)
- Born: Otto Hugo Fries; October 28, 1887; St. Louis, Missouri, United States
- Died: September 15, 1938 (aged 50); Los Angeles, California, United States
- Occupation: Actor
- Years active: 1920–1938
- Spouse: Vivian Marshall (1914–1938, his death)
- Children: 2, including Sherwood M. Fries

Otto Hugo Fries (October 28, 1887 – September 15, 1938) was an American film actor. He appeared in more than 120 films between 1920 and 1938.

== Biography ==
Fries was born in St. Louis, Missouri and died in 1938 in Los Angeles, California at age 50. He was the father of National Football League player Sherwood Fries.

Fries became a dapper-looking supporting comic with a varied background in medicine shows and vaudeville. He easily transitioned to film in the early 1910s. By 1915, he was with the Keystone Cops and entered a lifelong friendship with Stan Laurel, which led to appearances in that star comedian's early films for Bronco Billy Anderson. Not surprisingly, Fries later landed at Hal Roach Studios, where he supported not only Laurel & Hardy and Charley Chase but also such lesser stars as Max Davidson and James Finlayson.

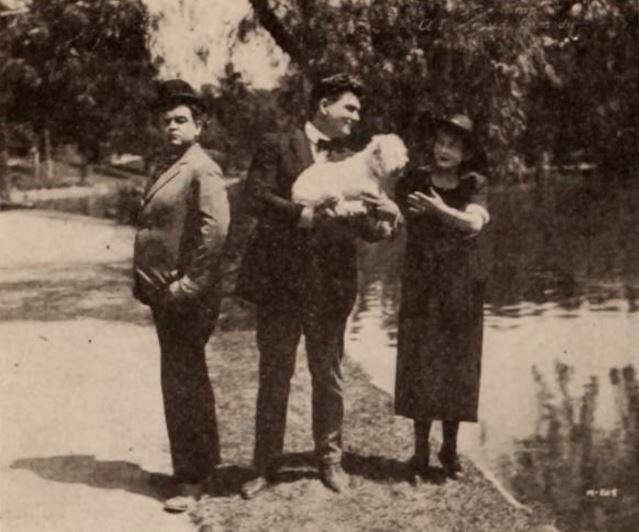
Lloyd Hamilton, Otto Fries, and Marvel Rea in The Simp (1920)

Sound proved no hindrance and Fries would appear in many of Roach's German-language talkies, as well as characters in many of the Our Gang shorts. Often cast as inebriates, detectives, and bartenders (with a memorable turn as a Blacksmith matching wits with a delinquent 9-year-old in Roach's Readin' and Writin'), Fries played scores of bit parts and walk-ons in grade-A films. One of his more notable appearances was as a shiphand in the Marx Brothers' Monkey Business.

== Partial filmography ==
- The Weak-End Party (1922, Short) - The Overseer
- The Handy Man (1923, Short) - The overseer
- Wet Paint (1926) - Policeman (uncredited)
- Hotel Imperial (1927) - Anton Klinak
- The Broncho Twister (1927) - Sheriff
- The Second Hundred Years (1927, Short) - Lecoque (uncredited)
- The Missing Link (1927) - (uncredited)
- Call of the Cuckoo (1927, Short) - Party Guest (uncredited)
- Surrender (1927) - Tarras
- Leave 'Em Laughing (1928, Short) - Burly Dentist (uncredited)
- From Soup to Nuts (1928, Short) - Chef (uncredited)
- Riley the Cop (1928) - Munich Cabman (uncredited)
- The Younger Generation (1929) - Tradesman (uncredited)
- Railroadin' (1929, Short) - Joe's Father (uncredited)
- The First Seven Years (1930, Short) - Speck's Father (uncredited)
- Little Daddy (1931, Short) - Orphan asylum agent
- Bargain Day (1931, Short) - Policeman not in uniform
- Pardon Us (1931) - Dentist (uncredited)
- Monkey Business (1931) - Ship's 2nd Officer (uncredited)
- On the Loose (1931, Short) - Belligerent Bully (uncredited)
- Readin' and Writin' (1932, Short) - The Blacksmith
- Free Eats (1932, Short) - Detective
- Choo-Choo! (1932, Short) - Inebriated novelties salesman
- The Night of June 13 (1932) - Baliff (uncredited)
- The Kid from Borneo (1933, Short) - The Kids' Dad
- Corruption (1933) - Policeman (uncredited)
- Footlight Parade (1933) - Bartender in 'Shanghai Lil' (uncredited)
- Saturday's Millions (1933) - Old Grad (uncredited)
- Hips, Hips, Hooray! (1934) - Mountaineer (uncredited)
- The Cat and the Fiddle (1934) - Piano Mover (uncredited)
- Riptide (1934) - Doorman (uncredited)
- Stamboul Quest (1934) - Train Conductor (uncredited)
- She Was a Lady (1934) - Bartender (uncredited)
- The Merry Widow (1934) - Policeman (uncredited)
- Broadway Bill (1934) - Waiter (uncredited)
- Music in the Air (1934) - Butcher (uncredited)
- The Best Man Wins (1935) - Policeman (uncredited)
- The Mystery Man (1935) - Nate, Pawnbroker
- George White's 1935 Scandals (1935) - Soloist (uncredited)
- The Arizonian (1935) - Wells Fargo Agent (uncredited)
- Here Comes the Band (1935) - The Riveter / Cymbalist (uncredited)
- Anna Karenina (1935) - Officer at Banquet (uncredited)
- A Night at the Opera (1935) - Otto - Elevator Operator (uncredited)
- Mary Burns, Fugitive (1935) - Clerk at Employment Agency (uncredited)
- Ah, Wilderness! (1935) - German Truck Driver (uncredited)
- Next Time We Love (1936) - Conductor (uncredited)
- Timothy's Quest (1936) - Timid Tenor (uncredited)
- The Trail of the Lonesome Pine (1936) - Corsey
- The Story of Louis Pasteur (1936) - Servant (uncredited)
- Small Town Girl (1936) - Townsman (uncredited)
- The King Steps Out (1936) - Minor Role (uncredited)
- Sons o' Guns (1936) - German Spy
- Human Cargo (1936) - German Cook (uncredited)
- Pepper (1936) - Delicatessen Proprietor (uncredited)
- Star for a Night (1936) - Chauffeur (uncredited)
- Love on the Run (1936) - Mechanic (uncredited)
- Born to Dance (1936) - Quartet Member (uncredited)
- Charlie Chan at the Opera (1936) - Innkeeper (uncredited)
- Banjo on My Knee (1936) - Deputy (uncredited)
- When You're in Love (1937) - Otto- Musician (uncredited)
- Espionage (1937) - Driver (uncredited)
- The Hit Parade (1937) - Majordomo (uncredited)
- Pick a Star (1937) - Contest Judge (uncredited)
- Parnell (1937) - Singing Irish Member (uncredited)
- Slave Ship (1937) - Singer (uncredited)
- Love in a Bungalow (1937) - Policeman
- The Prisoner of Zenda (1937) - Luggage Officer (uncredited)
- Bulldog Drummond Comes Back (1937) - Sanghil Wun - Pub Proprietor (uncredited)
- Life Begins with Love (1937) - Policeman (uncredited)
- A Girl with Ideas (1937) - Policeman (uncredited)
- Under Suspicion (1937)
- High Flyers (1937) - Fat Man on Kiddie Ride (uncredited)
- Expensive Husbands (1937) - Franz, Buggy Driver
- Prescription for Romance (1937) - Police Sergeant (uncredited)
- Every Day's a Holiday (1937) - Quartet member
- Arsène Lupin Returns (1938) - Truck Driver (uncredited)
- Romance in the Dark (1938) - Policeman (uncredited)
- Test Pilot (1938) - Bartender (uncredited)
- Go Chase Yourself (1938) - Rube Wardell - Ventriloquist (uncredited)
- The Devil's Party (1938) - Detective (uncredited)
- Alexander's Ragtime Band (1938) - Trio Member
- The Lone Wolf in Paris (1938) - Peter - Rifleman (uncredited)
- Boy Meets Girl (1938) - Olaf - Masseur (uncredited)
- The Mad Miss Manton (1938) - Homicide Detective (uncredited)
