= Business Before Honesty =

1918 film

- Directed by: Charley Chase
- Produced by: Abe Stern; Julius Stern
- Starring: Oliver Hardy
- Production company: L-KO Kompany
- Distributed by: Universal Film Manufacturing Company
- Release date: August 1918
- Country: United States
- Language: Silent (English intertitles)

Business Before Honesty is a 1918 American silent comedy film featuring Oliver Hardy.

== Cast ==
- Harry Gribbon as Willie Steal
- Oliver Hardy as The Blind Man (credited as Babe Hardy)
- Eddie Barry as Nellie
- May Emory as The Woman (as Mae Emory)
- Helen Lynch as Her Daughter

== Reception ==
Like many American films of the time, Business Before Honesty was subject to restrictions and cuts by city and state film censorship boards. For example, the Chicago Board of Censors required cuts, in Reel 1, of two closeups of a fifty cent piece, and, Reel 2, scene of man looking suggestively at seat after first scene of pouring gasoline into safe.

== See also ==
- List of American films of 1918
- Oliver Hardy filmography
