= Lonesome Luke, Lawyer =

1917 film

- Directed by: Hal Roach
- Produced by: Hal Roach
- Starring: Harold Lloyd
- Release date: February 18, 1917
- Country: United States
- Languages: Silent; English intertitles

Lonesome Luke, Lawyer is a 1917 American short comedy film featuring Harold Lloyd.

== Cast ==
- Harold Lloyd as Lonesome Luke
- Bebe Daniels
- Snub Pollard
- Bud Jamison
- Charles Stevenson (as Charles E. Stevenson)
- W.L. Adams
- Estelle Harrison
- Sidney De Gray
- Gus Leonard
- Lottie Case
- Sammy Brooks
- Merta Sterling (as Myrtle Sterling)
- Dorothea Wolbert (as Dorothy Wolbert)
- Harry L. Rattenberry
- C.G. King
- Norman Napier

== See also ==
- Harold Lloyd filmography
