= The King of the Kitchen =

Comedy film was made in 1918 called The King Of Kitchen starring role Oliver Hardy

- Directed by: Frank Griffin
- Produced by: Abe Stern; Julius Stern
- Starring: Oliver Hardy
- Release date: October 30, 1918
- Running time: 20 minutes
- Country: United States
- Languages: Silent film English intertitles

The King of the Kitchen is a 1918 American silent comedy film featuring Oliver Hardy.

== Plot ==
The following short synopsis appeared in The Moving Picture Weekly for December 14, 1918.

Harry Gribbon says when he gets through with his new L-Ko comedy, "The King of the Kitchen," he is going to apply for a position as cook in the army. Harry plays the part of a cook and combination housemaid in this new comedy, and supposedly is gifted with rare culinary powers. May Emory, who is his leading lady and unfortunately had to partake of some pancakes which Harry cooked for the picture, says she hopes no soldier will ever have to eat what Harry Gribbon cooks — that is, no soldier of Uncle Sam or his allies. But she thinks his pancakes would make fine food for the Huns.

This plot synopsis appeared in The Moving Picture World for November 2, 1918:

A two-reel comic with Harry Gribbon, Mae Emery, Billy Armstrong and Eva Novak in the cast. This begins in a restaurant, where Harry Gribbon acts as chef. A city couple drop In and make an effort to steal the cash box. This has a number of laughs in it, the action being of the nonsensical, knockabout sort.

== Cast ==
- Harry Gribbon as the chef
- Rosa Gore as the owner of the house (as Rose Gore)
- Eva Novak as Gore's niece
- May Emory as a crooked lady (as Mae Emory)
- Billy Armstrong as a crooked gentleman
- Oliver Hardy as a German customer (as Babe Hardy)
- Merta Sterling

== See also ==
- List of American films of 1918
- Oliver Hardy filmography
