= Marion Aye =

American actress

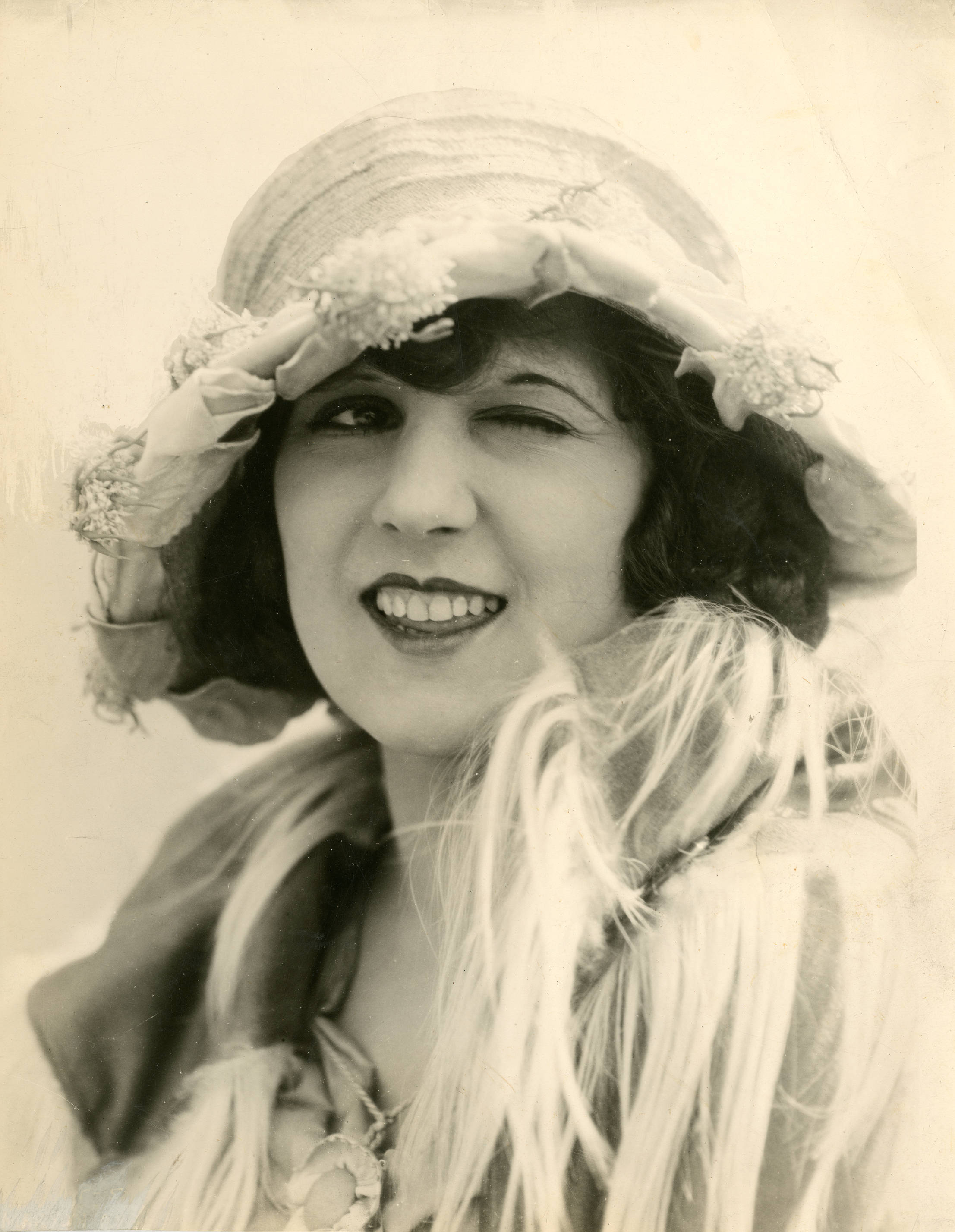
- Aye in 1924
- Born: April 5, 1903; Chicago, Illinois, U.S.
- Died: July 21, 1951 (aged 48); Hollywood, California, U.S.
- Other name: Maryon Aye
- Occupations: Actress, model, vaudeville performer
- Years active: 1919–1926
- Spouse: Harry Wilson (m. 1920; div. 1924)

Marion Aye (April 5, 1903 – July 21, 1951) was an American actress of screen and stage who starred in several films during the 1920s, mostly comedies. She was sometimes credited as Maryon Aye.

== Early life ==
Born in Chicago, Illinois, Aye was the daughter of attorney James H. Aye.

== Career ==
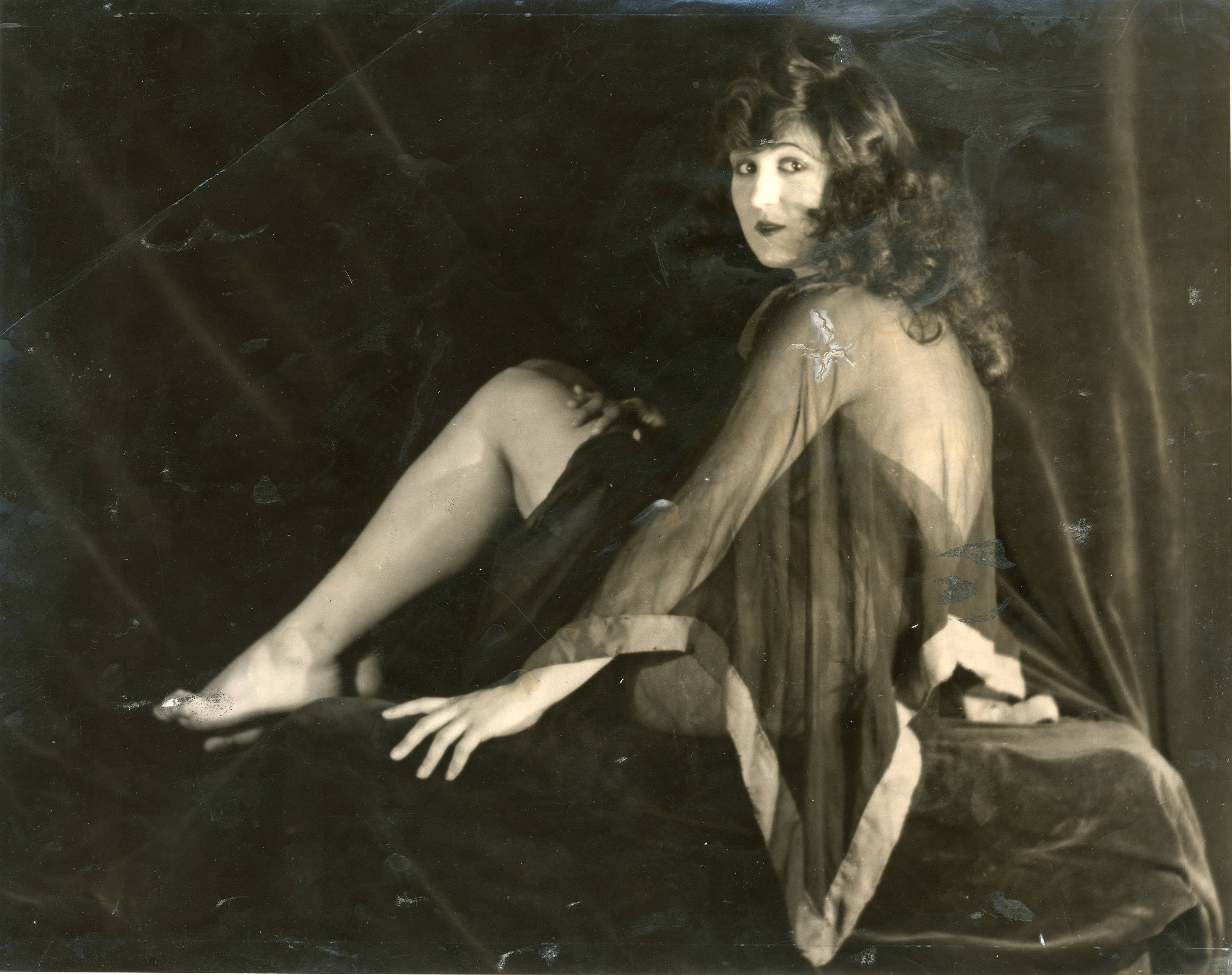
Aye in 1922

Aye was selected as one of the WAMPAS Baby Stars in 1922. She was a capable dancer, a talent she exhibited in several films. Aye was Larry Semon's leading lady in The Hick and worked with Stan Laurel in The Weak-End Party. She appeared in eighteen western shorts opposite Bob Reeves. When she signed a long-term film contract she became the first Hollywood star to agree to a morality clause. Her last film role was in the 1926 comedy Irene, starring Colleen Moore, although she continued to work in vaudeville.

In November 1927, Aye was one of six people arrested for their participation in presenting the play The Married Virgin at The Green Street Theatre in San Francisco; the charge was that the play was immoral. The other five had been arrested on the charge once before, but it was Aye's first time.

== Personal life ==
Aye's second husband was publicist Harry Wilson; they were married from 1920 until 1924.

== Later years and death ==
Following retirement, she suffered from depression over her isolation from the film industry. In 1935, she attempted suicide by swallowing poison. She continued to have depression and on July 10, 1951, Aye was found in a "semi-conscious condition" after swallowing a handful of bi-chloride of mercury tablets in a motel room in Culver City, California. Her last words to her husband were: "I dropped one of the tablets on the floor and I'm afraid the dog will get it." She died eleven days later in a Los Angeles County hospital. Her father reported that she was despondent after failing to get a part in a television play.

== Filmography ==
Year	Title	Role	Notes
1919	A Yankee Doodle in Berlin	Bathing Beauty	Uncredited
1921	The Hick	The Farmer's Daughter	
1921	Montana Bill		
1921	The Vengeance Trail	Grace Winwood	Credited as Maryon Aye
1922	Streak of Yellow		
1922	Double Reward		
1922	No Man's Gold		
1922	Phantom of the Hills		
1922	West Meets East		
1922	His Brother's Blood		
1922	The Claim Jumpers		
1922	The Weak-End Party	Lily, the birthday girl	
1922	The Punctured Prince		
1923	The Eternal Three	Maid	Credited as Maryon Aye
1923	The Meanest Man in the World	Nellie Clarke	Credited as Maryon Aye
1924	The Last Man on Earth	Red Sal	
1924	The Roughneck	Marrat's Girl	Credited as Maryon Aye
1926	Irene	Helen Cheston	Credited as Maryon Aye
