= Russ Powell =

American actor

- Born: September 16, 1875; Indianapolis, Indiana, U.S.
- Died: November 28, 1950 (aged 75); Los Angeles, California, U.S.
- Occupation: Actor
- Years active: 1915–1943

Russ Powell (September 16, 1875 – November 28, 1950) was an American film actor. He appeared in 186 films between 1915 and 1943. He was born in Indianapolis, Indiana, and died in Los Angeles, California.

== Selected filmography ==
- The Fashion Shop (1915, Short) - Fat Customer
- The Tale of the Night Before (1915) - Henry's friend
- Fat and Furious (1917) - Merta's Father
- Clean Sweep (1918) - The Butcher
- Smoldering Embers (1920) - Tramp
- Dangerous Days (1920) - Bartender (uncredited)
- The Slim Princess (1920) - The Governor General
- The Soul of Youth (1920) - Patrolman Jones
- One Stolen Night (1923)
- Kindled Courage (1923) - Marshal
- The Hunchback of Notre Dame (uncredited) (1923)
- A Boy of Flanders - Baas Kronstadt (1924)
- Open All Night (1924) (uncredited)
- Dynamite Smith (1924)
- The Wheel (1925)
- The Show (1927)
- The Red Mill (1927)
- Tillie the Toiler (1927) (uncredited)
- Soft Cushions (1927)
- Surrender! (1927) (uncredited)
- Why Sailors Go Wrong (1928) (uncredited)
- Vamping Venus (1928)
- The Cossacks (1928) (uncredited)
- Napoleon's Barber (1928 short)
- Riley the Cop (1928) (uncredited)
- Sailor's Holiday (1929) (uncredited)
- Safety in Numbers (1930) (uncredited)
- The Big Trail (1930) (uncredited)
- Check and Double Check (1930)
- The Grand Parade (1930)
- The Sin Ship (1931)
- The Public Enemy (1931) (uncredited)
- An American Tragedy (1931)
- The Sin of Madelon Claudet (1931)
- Lady and Gent (1932)
- King Kong (1933) - Watchman (uncredited)
- Central Airport (1933) (uncredited)
- Roman Scandals (1933) (uncredited)
- The House on 56th Street (1933) (uncredited)
- The Count of Monte Cristo (1934) (uncredited)
- Call of the Wild (1935)
- The Three Musketeers (1935) (uncredited)
- Barbary Coast (1935) (uncredited)
- A Night at the Opera (1935) (uncredited)
- Divot Diggers (1936, Short) (voice)
- A Day at the Races (1937) (uncredited)
- The Emperor's Candlesticks (1937) (uncredited)
- Stella Dallas (1937) (uncredited)
- The Prisoner of Zenda (1937) (uncredited)
- The Wrong Road (1937)
- The Cowboy and the Lady (1938) (uncredited)
- Santa Fe Stampede (1938) (uncredited)
- Son of Frankenstein (1939) (uncredited)
- I Stole a Million (1939) (uncredited)
- The Hunchback of Notre Dame (1939) (uncredited)
- When the Daltons Rode (1940) (uncredited)
- The Return of Frank James (1940) (uncredited)
- Citizen Kane (1941) (uncredited)
- Action in the North Atlantic (1943) (uncredited)
