= Julius Stern (producer) =

Film producer

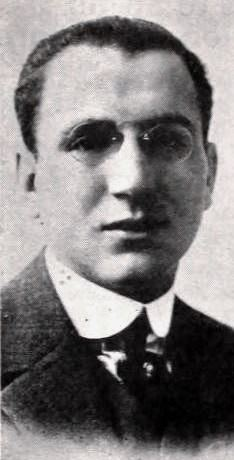
- From a 1921 magazine
- Born: March 22, 1886; Hintersteinau, Germany
- Died: April 26, 1977; New York City, New York, United States
- Years active: 1906-1935;

Julius Stern (March 22, 1886 – April 26, 1977) was an American film producer. He produced 541 films between 1917 and 1929. He was a co-founder of Universal Studios. He was born in Hintersteinau, Germany, and died in New York City, New York. He was the brother of producer Abe Stern and the brother-in-law of Universal Studios co-founder Carl Laemmle.

== Biography ==
Stern arrived in the United States in 1903 and soon thereafter worked with Carl Laemmle at Continental Clothing (which was owned by Julius' uncle Salomon "Sam" Stern). After Laemmle left Continental in 1905, Julius went to work for Laemmle as an Assistant Manager (1906), then as a Manager (1908) of Laemmle's White Front Theater (1908) and was named Carl Laemmle's personal assistant. He was instrumental in the founding and operation of the Laemmle Film Exchange and the Independent Moving Picture Company (IMP), where he was General Manager, until the founding of Universal. Stern was integral to Laemmle's acquisition of control at Universal. Julius was briefly a Director (1912). and an officer (1912-1929) of Universal Studios and President of L-KO Studios (1916-1919). and Century Comedies (1917-1926), which released under Universal.

Many silent film stars were “discovered” by Julius and his brother Abe, who served as General Manager, under L-KO, Century and Rainbow, including Baby Peggy. Under Julius’ leadership, Century Comedies and later Stern Brothers often featured animals in comedic roles including “Brownie”, a dog, several lions and “Joe Martin” an orangutan. In 1926, Century Comedies was dissolved and Stern Brothers Comedy was founded. Stern Brothers continued to release under Universal until 1929 and introduced the world to film series featuring Tarzan, Buster Brown, Mike and Ike and Baby Snookums. In 1929, the Sterns’ relationship with Universal was abruptly discontinued with a telegram from Carl Laemmle and by April 1929 Stern Brothers was laying plans to produce sound feature films as well as continuing their comedy shorts and series at their newly formed National Sound Recording Studio. In 1933, Max and Arthur Alexander, nephews of Julius and Abe Stern, who had been operating National Studios, renamed the operation Alexander Brothers Studio and commenced production. By 1935 Julius Stern retired from active participation in the motion picture business to manage the real estate he had acquired over the years. The successor firms managed by the Alexander brothers and other relatives of Julius and Abe Stern continued producing movies and even films for television into the 1970s. Julius Stern died at his home in New York on April 26, 1977 at the age of 91.

== Selected filmography ==
- Whose Zoo? (1918)
- Business Before Honesty (1918)
- Hello Trouble (1918)
- Painless Love (1918)
- The King of the Kitchen ([1918)
- Hop, the Bellhop (1919)
- The Freckled Fish (1919)
- Lions and Ladies (1919)
- Hearts in Hock (1919)
- Laughing Gas (1920)
