= Our Wife (1931 film) =

1931 film by James W. Horne

- Directed by: James W. Horne
- Written by: H. M. Walker
- Produced by: Hal Roach
- Starring: Laurel and Hardy
- Cinematography: Jack Stevens
- Edited by: Richard C. Currier
- Music by: Marvin Hatley; Leroy Shield
- Distributed by: Metro-Goldwyn-Mayer
- Release date: May 16, 1931
- Running time: 20:45
- Country: United States
- Language: English

Our Wife is a 1931 American pre-Code Hal Roach comedy film starring Laurel and Hardy. It was directed by James W. Horne and released by Metro-Goldwyn-Mayer.

== Plot ==
Oliver's plans to marry his sweetheart, Dulcy, with Stan as his best man, face a series of obstacles.

Dulcy's father opposes the union upon seeing a photograph of Ollie, leading to the cancellation of the wedding arrangements. Additionally, Stan accidentally ruins the wedding cake by spraying it with fly spray.

Later, Ollie mistakenly ingests the insecticide, believing it to be throat medicine, resulting in him seeking relief by applying ice cubes, only to comically slip and fall on the ice.

Despite these mishaps, the couple decides to elope and arranges to meet a Justice of the Peace clandestinely. However, their elopement is marked by further comedic misadventures. They struggle to fit into a very small car (an American Austin coupe) mistakenly rented by Stan for the occasion; Ollie had asked Stan to get "a closed car - something we can drive ourselves" and expected a normal-sized sedan.

Eventually, they manage to squeeze into the car along with a suitcase, causing the vehicle to tilt under their weight, resulting in Stan's head protruding through the roof.

The situation culminates with a cross-eyed justice officiates a marriage ceremony, uniting Ollie and Stan in matrimony.

== Cast ==
- Stan Laurel as Stan
- Oliver Hardy as Ollie
- Babe London as Dulcy
- James Finlayson as Dulcy's Father
- Ben Turpin as Justice of the Peace
- Blanche Payson as Daughter of the Justice of the Peace
- Charley Rogers as Butler
