= Don't Write Letters =

1922 film directed by George D. Baker

- Directed by: George D. Baker
- Written by: George D. Baker
- Starring: Gareth Hughes; Bartine Burkett; Herbert Heyes
- Cinematography: Rudolph J. Bergquist
- Production company: Sawyer-Lubin Pictures Corporation
- Distributed by: Metro Pictures
- Release date: May 15, 1922
- Running time: 50 minutes
- Country: United States
- Language: Silent (English intertitles)

Don't Write Letters is a 1922 American silent comedy-drama film directed by George D. Baker and starring Gareth Hughes, Bartine Burkett, and Herbert Heyes.

== Plot ==
As described in a film magazine, the film begins with a well-drawn cartoon of an early man carving his love letters on stone and the effect of getting slapped on the head with one, and of a medieval scene where Romeo brings the wrath of Juliet's father when he writes love letters to her and slips them over the balcony. Robert "Babby" Jenks (Hughes) is a department store clerk who pictures himself a hero in love with a beautiful girl. When he enlists to fight in World War I he is handicapped by his small size and consigned to the mess tent. He orders a blouse from the supply room and, as a joke by his friends, is given one a size 44 instead of his size 34. While kicking about in disgust, he finds a letter in its pocket written by a young woman in the shirt factory who asks the "big guy" who gets it to write back. Bobby enters into a correspondence with her, Anna May Jackson (Burkett) of Flatbush, Brooklyn, New York. After becoming a hero of the Battle of Argonne and with the war over, Bobby returns to New York City but dreads telling Anna the truth. Therefore, he introduces another, larger soldier (Heyes) to Anna May. She refuses the substitute and forgives the real Bobby Jenks for his deception because, anyway, "he must have been a good mess cook."

== Cast ==
- Gareth Hughes as Robert W. Jenks
- Bartine Burkett as Anna May Jackson
- Herbert Heyes as Richard W. Jenks
- Harry Lorraine as The Father
- Margaret Mann as Aunt Jane
- Lois Lee as The Sweetheart
- Victor Potel as The Lover

== Bibliography ==
- Ronald Berman. The Great Gatsby and Modern Times. University of Illinois Press, 1996.
