= Babe London =

American actress (1901–80)

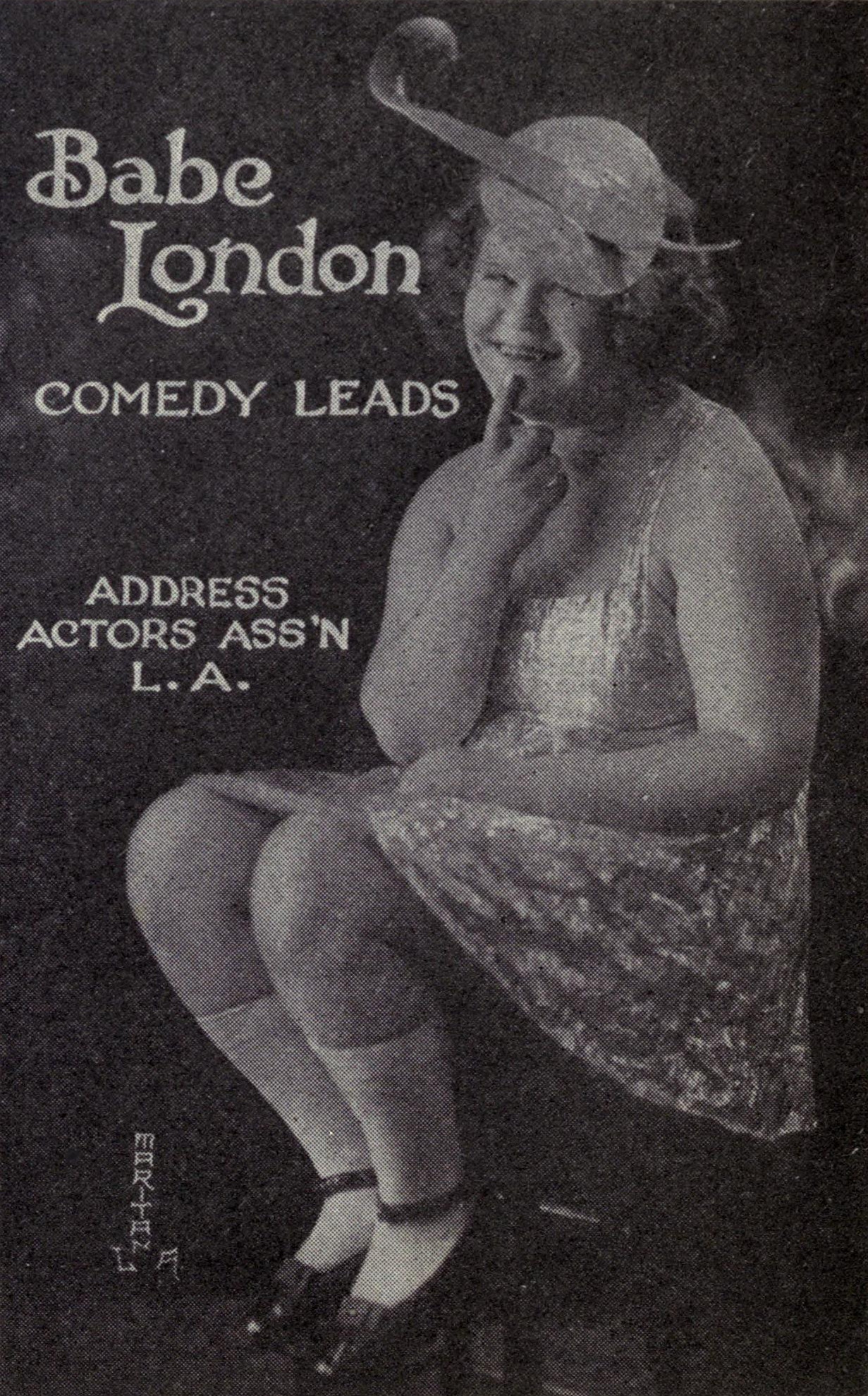
- London in 1921
- Born: Jean Glover; August 28, 1901; Des Moines, Iowa, U.S.
- Died: November 29, 1980 (aged 79); Woodland Hills, Los Angeles, California, U.S.
- Other name: Ruth Glover
- Years active: 1919 – 1960
- Spouse: Phil Boutelje (m. 1975–1979)

Babe London (born Jean Glover, August 28, 1901 – November 29, 1980) was an American actress and comedian, most remembered for her one-time partnership with Oliver Hardy in the 1931 Laurel and Hardy two-reeler Our Wife.

== Career ==
London was born in 1901 in Des Moines, Iowa. Her parents were Dr. David James Glover and Ruth Glover. After the family moved to California, London attended San Diego High School.

London began her screen career as a teenager making her film debut in The Expert Eloper in 1919. She then appeared in A Day's Pleasure, performing opposite Charlie Chaplin. The two played seasick tourists on an excursion boat. She had the role of Rosy Leadbetter in Merely Mary Ann (1920).

London appeared in more than 50 silent films, including The Perfect Flapper, The Boob and the 1928 version of Tillie's Punctured Romance starring W. C. Fields. She worked with many of the funny men of the day, including Harry Langdon and Chester Conklin.

At the height of her career, London weighed 255 pounds. Later, a heart condition necessitated a loss of 100 pounds, and her movie offers declined along with her weight. She never regained her earlier success. Her last most notable role was that of the toothless nurse Nora that Shemp Howard has eyes for in the Three Stooges film Scrambled Brains. Her last film appearance was in 1960's Sex Kittens Go to College.

== Later years ==
In the late 1950s, London began a second career as a painter and devoted the last 20 years of her life to depicting on canvas the early years of Hollywood. She titled the series The Vanishing Era.

== Personal life and death ==
In 1975, London married Hollywood musical director Phil Boutelje. Both were retired and living at the Motion Picture & Television Country House and Hospital in Woodland Hills, California, when they met. They continued to live there until Boutelje died on July 29, 1979. London willed 75 of her paintings to the University of Wyoming's American Heritage Center, along with her personal belongings.

== Selected filmography ==
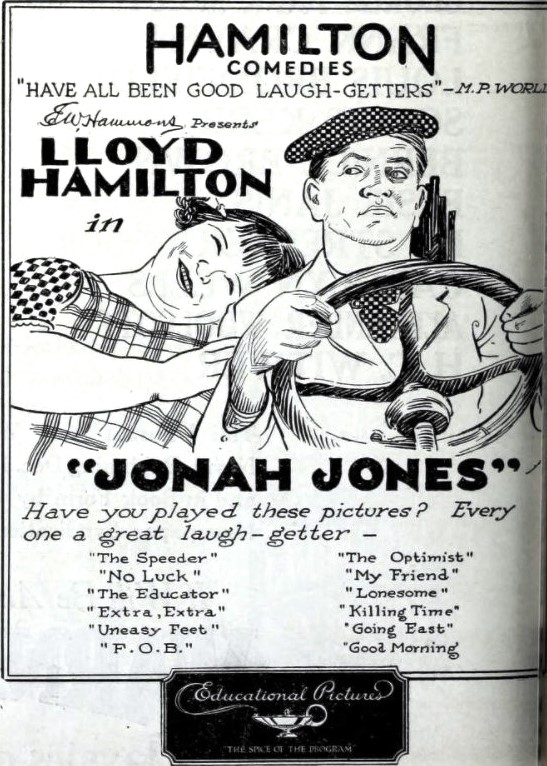
Poster for the American comedy short film Jonah Jones (1924) with Lloyd Hamilton and Babe London.

Year	Title	Role	Notes
1919	When the Clouds Roll by	Switchboard Operator	Uncredited
1919	A Day's Pleasure	Man's Seasick Wife	Uncredited
1920	Merely Mary Ann	Rosie Leadbatter	
1921	Why Worry?		
1922	The Weak-End Party	Party guest	
1923	The Balloonatic	Fat Girl at The House of Trouble	Uncredited
1923	The Handy Man	A house guest	
1924	Jonah Jones	Girlfriend	
1925	Go West	Woman in department store	Uncredited
1926	Is That Nice?	Winnie Nash	
1927	The Princess from Hoboken	Princess Sonia Alexandernova Karpoff	
1927	Long Pants	Wedding Guest	Uncredited
1927	The Fortune Hunter	Waitress	
1928	The Awakening		Uncredited
1930	New Moon	Buxom peasant girl on ship	Uncredited
1931	Our Wife	Dulcy, the bride	
1933	Hell Below	Fat girl on passing boat	Uncredited
1941	Six Lessons from Madame La Zonga	Dance student	Uncredited
1942	Jackass Mail	Dancehall Girl	Uncredited
1943	The Crystal Ball	Tandem Rider	Uncredited
1944	Here Come the Waves	Window washer	Uncredited
1945	The Clock	Laboratory Nurse	Uncredited
1946	No Leave, No Love	Melissa, a WAC	Uncredited
1947	Road to Rio	Woman	Uncredited
1948	Hollow Triumph	Hotel Lady with Orchid	Uncredited
1948	The Snake Pit	Attendant	Uncredited
1948	Joan of Arc	Camp follower	Uncredited
1948	The Paleface	Woman on wagon train	Uncredited
1949	Anna Lucasta	Woman in bar	Uncredited
1950	Mother Didn't Tell Me	Mrs. Hadley	Uncredited
1951	Pleasure Treasure		
1951	Scrambled Brains	Nora	Three Stooges short
1956	Bundle of Joy	Fat Woman	Uncredited
1957	The Unholy Wife	Customer	Uncredited
1955	Sergeant Preston of the Yukon	Mrs. Martin	Episode: "Trouble at Hogback"
1959	The Bob Cummings Show		Episode: "Bob Clashes with Ken"
1960	Sex Kittens Go to College	Miss Cadwallader	Alternative titles: The Beauty and the Robot; Teacher Versus Sexpot
1960	The Best of Post	Shopper	Episode: "The Little Terror"
