= The Freckled Fish =

1919 film

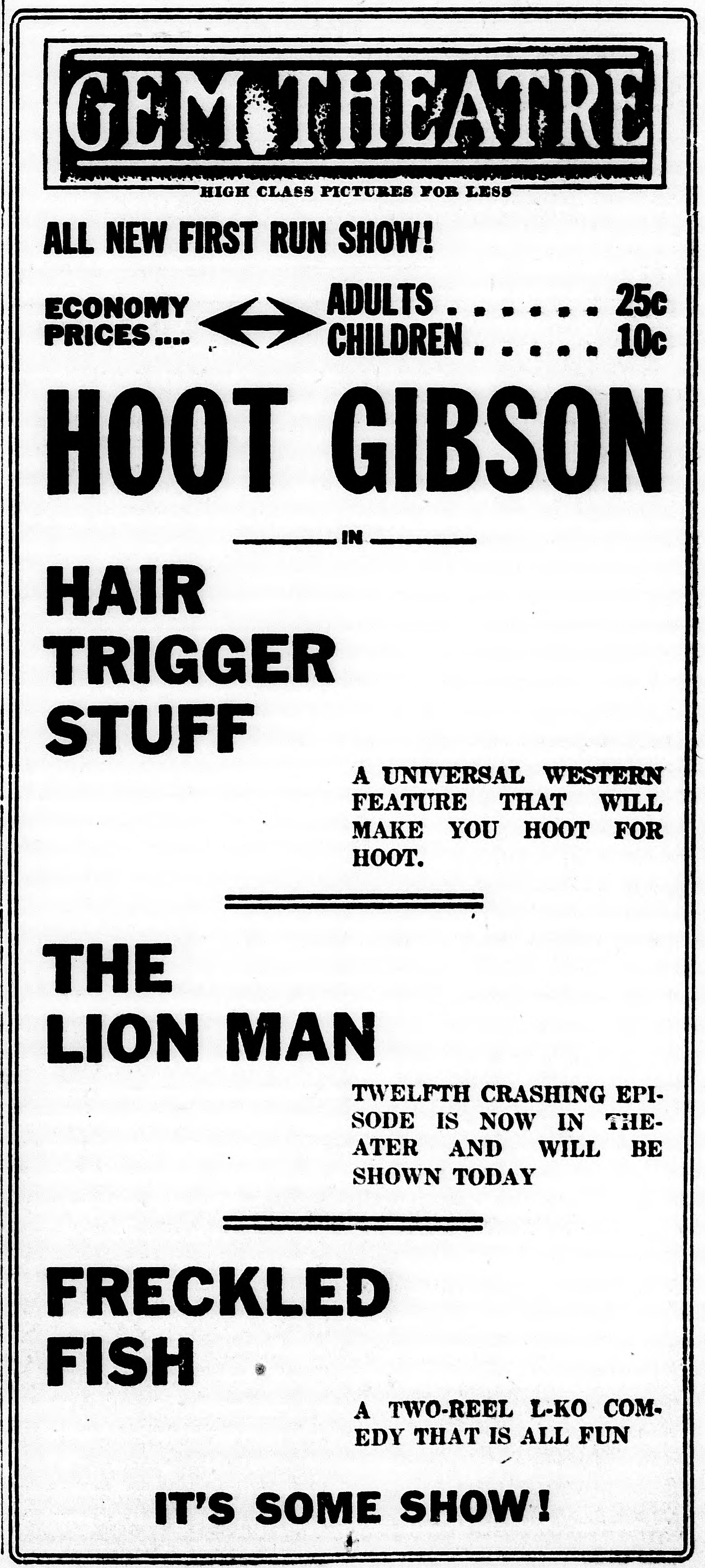
- Advertisement for the film and others
- Directed by: Joseph Le Brandt
- Produced by: Abe Stern; Julius Stern
- Starring: Oliver Hardy
- Release date: January 22, 1919
- Country: United States
- Languages: Silent film English intertitles

The Freckled Fish is a 1919 American silent comedy film featuring Oliver Hardy. Simon Louvish describes this as part of the "Charlie from the Orient" series starring Chai Hong as a kind of "Chinese Charlie Chaplin." Reviews were tepid, with The Moving Picture World declaring that "the action is too indefinite to hold the attention closely, and the number as a whole is only fair." This was Hardy's last film with L-KO studios before he joined Vitagraph.

== Plot ==
This plot synopsis comes from the original Library of Congress copyright filing for the film:

If you are thinking of trout, don't bank on it, for it's just as likely to be clam chowder with no clams in it, for the "Freckled Fish" is just the name of the restaurant where our old friend Chai Chow masquerades as the head waiter. Solomon Soopmeat commands the kitchen regiment and old Aunt Chloe adds color to his sector. And, of course, there is the cashier, who makes the customers forget how much of the meal was missing, and also their change.

— Joseph Le Brandt

== Cast ==
- Chai Hong as Chai Chow
- Oliver Hardy as Solomon Soopmeat (listed as Babe Hardy)
- Eva Novak as Aunt Chloe

== See also ==
- List of American films of 1919
- Oliver Hardy filmography
