= Whose Zoo? =

1918 film

- Directed by: Craig Hutchinson
- Written by: Craig Hutchinson
- Produced by: Julius Stern
- Starring: Stan Laurel
- Release date: May 22, 1918
- Running time: 2 reels (approximately 20 minutes)
- Country: United States
- Languages: Silent film English intertitles

Whose Zoo? is a 1918 American 2-reel comedy film featuring Stan Laurel.

== Plot ==
This plot synopsis comes from the original Library of Congress copyright filing for the film:

Stanley is the head waiter in a swell hotel and is very much stuck on the job. Rube, on a sight-seeing expedition to the city, comes to the hotel as a guest and is sighted by Stanley, who proceeds to have sport with him. Katherine and her husband come to the hotel as guests. Rube and Stanley both lamp her and try to flirt with the pretty wife. The husband gets jealous. Rube gets a job in a zoo. He incurs the displeasure of one of the keepers and is locked in a cage with the animals, the keeper thinking to frighten Rube. Rube, aroused, cleans up the cage. The elephant gets loose and runs amuck. He enters the lobby of the hotel, followed by the bear. Rube has returned to the hotel and Katherine is sleeping in a bedroom after a bath. The elephant ascends to the second story, and is prowling around. He reaches through the door and playfully places the bear in the bed with Katherine. She sees the bear and flees, shouting at the top of her voice. The husband hears her and she partially explains. He thinks Rube has gotten into Katherine's bed and rushes in armed with a bed-slat and begins to pummel the bear, who comes out of bed and chases the husband. The husband runs into Rube and Stanley, who are also chased by the bear. Rube and Stanley leap out of windows, run over roofs, and have hairbreadth escapes in fleeing from the animals and once safe, vow never again to tempt fate by flirting with another man's wife.

— Craig Hutchinson

== Cast ==
- Kathleen O'Connor as Katherine
- Rube Miller as Rube
- Stan Laurel as Stanley
- Charlie the Elephant as Eddie the Elfa-Nut

== See also ==
- List of American films of 1918
