= The Snowshoe Trail =

1922 film

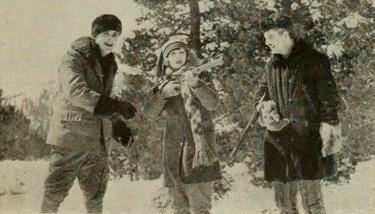
- Directed by: Chester Bennett
- Written by: Edison Marshall (novel); Marion Fairfax
- Produced by: Chester Bennett
- Starring: Jane Novak; Roy Stewart; Lloyd Whitlock
- Cinematography: Jack MacKenzie
- Production company: Chester Bennett Productions
- Distributed by: Film Booking Offices of America
- Release date: September 17, 1922
- Running time: 53 minutes
- Country: United States
- Languages: Silent; English intertitles

The Snowshoe Trail is a 1922 American silent Western film directed by Chester Bennett and starring Jane Novak, Roy Stewart and Lloyd Whitlock.

== Cast ==
- Jane Novak as Virginia Tremont
- Roy Stewart as Bill Bronson
- Lloyd Whitlock as Harold Lounsbury
- Herbert Prior as George Edmunson
- Kate Toncray as Mrs. Bronson
- Spottiswoode Aitken as John Lounsbury
- Chai Hong as Hop Sing
- William McCall as Fur Trapper

== Bibliography ==
- Munden, Kenneth White. The American Film Institute Catalog of Motion Pictures Produced in the United States, Part 1. University of California Press, 1997.
