= The Meanest Man in the World (1923 film) =

1923 film directed by Edward F. Cline

- Directed by: Edward F. Cline
- Screenplay by: Austin McHugh (scenario); Lenore Coffee (adaptation); John Goodrich (adaptation)
- Based on: the play, The Meanest Man in the World by: George M. Cohan; Everett S. Ruskay
- Starring: Bert Lytell; Blanche Sweet; Bryant Washburn; Maryon Aye
- Cinematography: Arthur Martinelli
- Production company: Principal Pictures
- Distributed by: Associated First National Pictures
- Release date: October 22, 1923 (US)
- Running time: 6 reels
- Country: United States
- Language: English

The Meanest Man in the World is a 1923 American silent comedy film. Directed by Edward F. Cline, the film stars Bert Lytell, Blanche Sweet, and Bryant Washburn. It was released on October 22, 1923. As of 2025, this film is considered lost.

== Cast ==
- Bert Lytell as Richard Clark
- Blanche Sweet as Jane Hudson
- Bryant Washburn as Ned Stevens
- Maryon Aye as Nellie Clarke
- Lincoln Stedman as Bart Nash, the office boy
- Helen Lynch as Kitty Crockett, the stenographer
- Ward Crane as Carleton Childs
- Frances Raymond as Mrs. Clarke
- Carl Stockdale as Hiram Leeds
- Tom Murray as Andy Oatman
