= Painless Love =

1918 film

- Directed by: Charley Chase
- Produced by: Abe Stern; Julius Stern
- Starring: Oliver Hardy
- Production company: L-KO Kompany
- Distributed by: Universal Film Manufacturing Company
- Release date: October 23, 1918
- Running time: 2 reels
- Country: United States
- Language: Silent (English intertitles)

Painless Love is a 1918 American silent comedy film featuring Oliver Hardy.

== Cast ==
- Oliver Hardy as Dr. Hurts (credited as Babe Hardy)
- Billy Armstrong as His assistant
- Charles Inslee as The building owner
- Peggy Prevost as Swimming pool manager

== Reception ==
Like many American films of the time, Painless Love was subject to restrictions and cuts by city and state film censorship boards. For example, the Chicago Board of Censors required a cut, in Reel 1, of two scenes of a young woman in a one piece bathing suit playing hide-and-seek with the man, near view of young women at pool, two near views of young woman in bathing suit with apron, Reel 2, first two and last two scenes of young women in one piece bathing suits, two closeups of young woman with low cut gown at table, scene of man throwing coin in trouser front and following vulgar actions, two near views of couple in suggestive dance, and three scenes of "Madam Bevo" in suggestive dance where he wriggles tail of hula costume.

== See also ==
- List of American films of 1918
- Oliver Hardy filmography
