= Bartine Burkett =

American actress

Bartine Burkett Zane
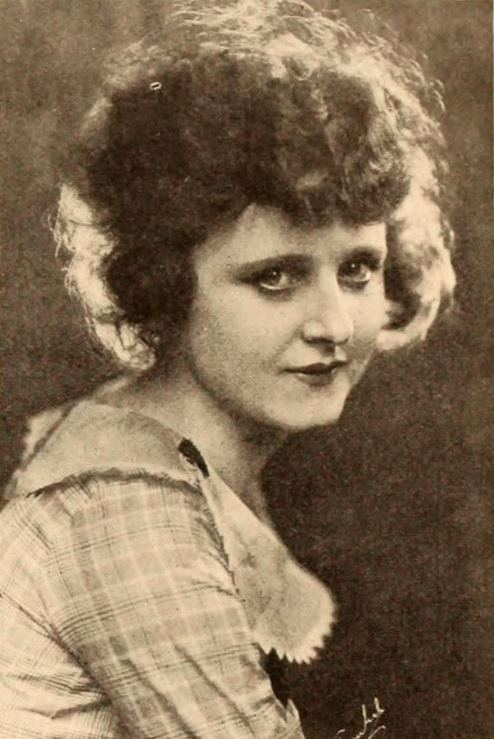
- Burkett, Aug. 21, 1920 Exhibitors Herald
- Born: February 9, 1898
- Died: May 20, 1994 (aged 96); Burbank, California, U.S.
- Occupation: Actress
- Years active: 1917–1983
- Spouse: Ralph Zane (1928-1968; his death)

Bartine Burkett Zane (February 9, 1898 – May 20, 1994) was an American film actress.

Burkett had a brother, Arthur. She gained acting experience in productions of the Shreveport Dramatic Club.

Burkett was engaged to be married, but her fiance, an American Expeditionary Forces officer, was killed in France in 1918.

As early as 1914, Burkett worked as an extra in Famous Players–Lasky films. She progressed to feature roles by the end of that decade. She is best recalled for her silent comedies and her late-in-life appearances in sitcoms and TV commercials. She appeared in nearly sixty silent films before retiring upon her 1928 marriage to Ralph Leland Zane. Among her earliest co-stars and friends were Buster Keaton, Roscoe "Fatty" Arbuckle, Al St. John and Stan Laurel.

In 1973, five years after her husband's death, she returned to acting, appearing in three films and a number of television programs and advertisements.

She died in Burbank, California at age 96. She is buried in Forest Lawn Memorial Park in North Hollywood, California.

== Selected filmography ==
- The Forest Nymph (1917)
- The Girl and the Ring (1917)
- The Magic Jazz-Bo (1917)
- Mum's the Word (1918)
- Clean Sweep (1918)
- Hello Trouble (1918)
- Hickory Hiram (1918)
- Home, James (1918)
- Hearts in Hock (1919)
- The Aero-Nut (1920)
- The Turning Point (1920)
- The High Sign (1921)
- Don't Write Letters (1922)
- Cornered (1924)
- He Who Gets Slapped (1924)
- The Golden Bed (1925)
- Seven Chances (1925)
- Curses! (1925)
- Bunco Boys and How to Beat Them (1973)
- Galaxina (1980)
- The Devil and Max Devlin (1981)
