= Vamping Venus =

1928 film

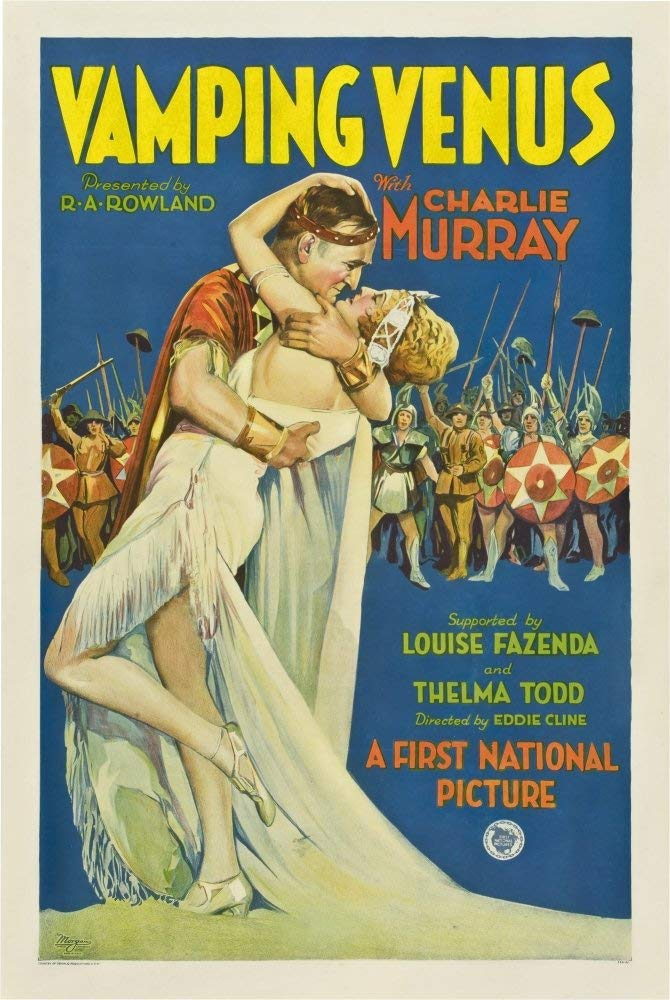
- Theatrical release poster
- Directed by: Edward F. Cline
- Screenplay by: Howard J. Green; Ralph Spence
- Story by: Bernard McConville
- Starring: Charles Murray; Louise Fazenda; Thelma Todd; Russ Powell; Joe Bonomo; Guinn "Big Boy" Williams
- Cinematography: Devereaux Jennings
- Edited by: Paul Weatherwax
- Production company: First National Pictures
- Distributed by: First National Pictures
- Release date: May 13, 1928
- Running time: 7 reels
- Country: United States
- Language: Sound (Synchronized) (English intertitles)

Vamping Venus is a 1928 American synchronized sound comedy film directed by Edward F. Cline, written by Howard J. Green and Ralph Spence, and starring Charles Murray, Louise Fazenda, Thelma Todd, Russ Powell, Joe Bonomo and Guinn "Big Boy" Williams. While the film has no audible dialog, it was released with a synchronized musical score with sound effects using the sound-on-disc Vitaphone process. It was released on May 13, 1928, by First National Pictures.

== Plot ==
As described in a copyright application, Michael Cassidy may be the political boss of the Tenth Ward, popular with everyone, but at home Maggie Cassidy is his boss. When his henchmen prepare the Silver Spoon Nightclub for his annual dinner, Maggie tells him that he is going to stay at home and help entertain her brother's family. While she is blindfolded for a game of blind man's bluff, he flees. A troupe of Grecian dancers is performing at the night club. Their star, the beautiful Madame Vanezlos, begins a flirtation with Cassidy. Simonides, strongman of the troupe, is jealous and knocks out Cassidy with a bottle. Cassidy finds himself on a street in ancient Greece amid flying arrows. A battle is in progress where Hercules knocks everyone out. Cassidy recognizes him as Simonides and fells him with a brick. Mars, the god of war, sees this and makes Cassidy his warrior. Meeting Venus, Cassidy recognizes her as Vanezlos the dancer, and they resume their flirtation. Maggie in the form of the enchantress Circe and uses her magic wand to try and win him away from Venus. Cassidy follows Venus into the palace of Jupiter and when guards try to stop him, he distracts them by making grotesque shadows on the wall. Having been ordered to get a new master of ceremonies who can entertain Jupiter, the guards lead him before the god. Jupiter does not laugh and Cassidy is thrown to the lions. Mars assumes the form of a lion and performs amusing antics at Cassidy's command, making Jupiter laugh and sparing Cassidy's life. Cassidy introduces modern machinery and becomes ruler of Greece. Soon a rebellion breaks out against the buzzers, telephones, tanks, and machine guns. In the midst of the battle, Cassidy sees Hercules abducting Venus and with the aid of his troops rescues her. Back in the castle, Cassidy begins making his love moves on Venus when Circe appears and turns him into a mule. He kicks her and she returns him into a man, so he breaks her wand. Hercules pushes out two pillars of the castle, causing a wall to fall and a brick hits Cassidy in the head. Venus takes him into her arms. Cassidy suddenly recovers, finding himself in the arms of Madame Vanezlos in her dressing room. So his Grecian adventure was just a dream.

== Cast ==
- Charles Murray as Michael Cassidy/King Cassidy of Ireland
- Louise Fazenda as Maggie Cassidy/Circe
- Thelma Todd as Madame Vanezlos the Dancer/Venus
- Russ Powell as Pete Papaglos/Bacchus
- Joe Bonomo as Simonides the Strongman/Hercules
- Guinn "Big Boy" Williams as Mars
- Spec O'Donnell as Western Union Boy/Mercury
- Fred O'Beck as Vulcan
- Gusztáv Pártos as Shopkeeper
- Gustav von Seyffertitz as Jupiter
- Janet MacLeod as Juno
- Yola d'Avril as Stenographer

== Production ==
The film apparently reused sets and props from the First National film The Private Life of Helen of Troy (1927).

== Preservation ==
No film prints of Vamping Venus are known to exist in any film archives, making this a lost film. The soundtrack survives on Vitaphone discs.
