= Clean Sweep (film) =

- Produced by: Henry Lehrman
- Starring: Merta Sterling
- Distributed by: Universal Film Manufacturing Company
- Release date: July 24, 1918
- Running time: 2 reels
- Country: USA
- Language: Silent..English intertitles

Clean Sweep is a 1918 silent film comedy short. It was produced by the L-KO Kompany and starred actress Merta Sterling. It was distributed through Universal Film Manufacturing Company.

== Cast ==
- Eddie Barry
- Chai Hong - Charlie, the Chinese Laundry Man
- Merta Sterling - The Lady Barber
- Bartine Burkett - The Lady Barber's daughter
- Russ Powell - The Butcher (*as Rusell Powell)
- Billy Armstrong - Billy
