= Hop, the Bellhop =

1919 film

- Directed by: Charles Parrott
- Produced by: Abe Stern; Julius Stern
- Starring: Billy Armstrong; Babe Hardy
- Production company: L-KO Kompany
- Distributed by: Universal Film Manufacturing Company
- Release date: January 5, 1919
- Running time: 2 reels; 1,969 feet
- Country: United States
- Languages: Silent; English intertitles

Hop, the Bellhop is a 1919 American silent comedy film featuring Oliver Hardy (credited as Babe Hardy).

== Plot ==
This plot summary came from The Moving Picture Weekly for February 1, 1919:

Here we go "back to the dear old farm" on the Hickory Hills Limited, to where Tiny Toodles, the daughter of the Hotel proprietor, is the "main squeeze," though a rather tight one, because she is "built for comfort and not for speed." Jumping Jupiter is the bell hop of this best Hickory Hills hotel and he is full of monkey shines and shoe shines. Polly Tix, the cashier, has a pair of eyes that travel faster than the fastest traveling salesman. And into this little oasis of contentment comes none other than our fleshless friend — Solomon Soop. He comes because Tiny Toodles has been wigwagging with a matrimonial agency and has succumbed to the winsome charm of Soop's passport picture.

Now the last thing in the world that you would suspect, happens. A slippery fellow called Jerry Jippem, won over by Toodles' offer to give Soop a half interest in her father's hotel and a bonus of $500 for becoming her life partner, impersonates Soop. And then — you just can't get away from the picture till it is over.

== Cast ==
- Billy Armstrong as Jumping Jupiter
- Babe Hardy as Solomon Soop

== See also ==
- List of American films of 1919
- Oliver Hardy filmography
