= Lions and Ladies =

1919 film

- Directed by: Frank Griffin
- Produced by: Abe Stern; Julius Stern
- Starring: Oliver Hardy
- Release date: January 26, 1919
- Country: United States
- Languages: Silent film English intertitles

Lions and Ladies is a 1919 American comedy film featuring Oliver Hardy.

== Plot ==
This plot synopsis appeared in The Moving Picture World for March 1, 1919:

A fractious automobile plays an amusing part in the opening scenes of this knockabout number. There is scarcely a trace of plot, but some of the incidents are laughable. Animals and birds appear frequently, and the principal human characters all dive into the ocean at the close. The offering strikes a good average.

== Cast ==
- Oliver Hardy (as Babe Hardy)
- Harry Mann
- Rosa Gore
- Bobby Dunn

== See also ==
- List of American films of 1919
- Oliver Hardy filmography
