= Cornered (1924 film) =

1924 film

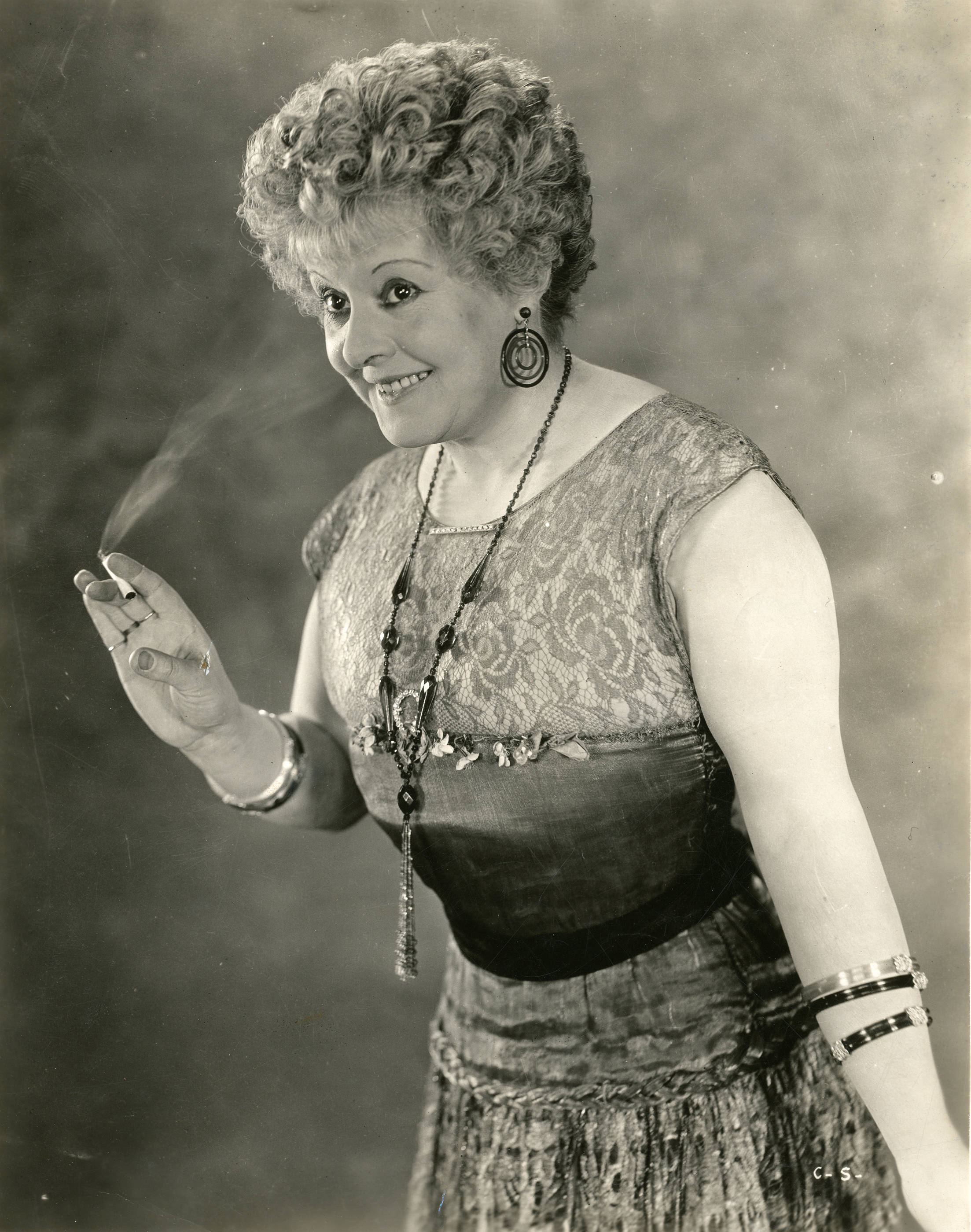
- Still with Cissy Fitzgerald
- Directed by: William Beaudine
- Written by: Louis D. Lighton; Hope Loring
- Based on: Cornered; 1920 play by Dodson Mitchell; Zelda Sears
- Starring: Marie Prevost
- Cinematography: Ray June
- Production company: Warner Bros.
- Distributed by: Warner Bros.
- Release date: August 1, 1924
- Running time: 70 minutes
- Country: United States
- Language: Silent (English intertitles)
- Budget: $94,000
- Box office: $257,000

Cornered is a 1924 American silent drama film directed by William Beaudine. The story was filmed again in 1930 as a talkie called Road to Paradise. It was also directed by Beaudine. According to Warner Bros records the film earned $235,000 domestically and $22,000 foreign.

== Cast ==
- Marie Prevost as Mary Brennan / Margaret Waring
  - Virginia Marshall as Mary Brennan / Margaret Waring as a Child
- Rockliffe Fellowes as Jerry, the Gent
- Raymond Hatton as Nick, the Dope
- John Roche as George Wells
- Cissy Fitzgerald as Lola Mulvaney
- Vera Lewis as Mrs. Wells
- George C. Pearce as Brewster (as George Pearce)
- Bartine Burkett as The Bride
- Billy Bletcher as The Groom (as Billy Fletcher)
- Ruth Dwyer as Mrs. Webster
- Bertram Johns as Webster
- Wilfred Lucas as Updike

== Status ==
With no copies of Cornered located in any film archives, it is considered to be a lost film.
