= A Day's Pleasure =

1919 short film by Charlie Chaplin

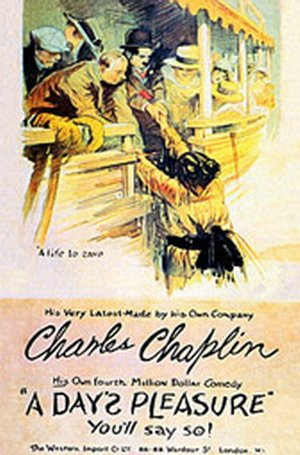
- Theatrical poster to A Day's Pleasure
- Directed by: Charlie Chaplin
- Written by: Charlie Chaplin
- Produced by: Charlie Chaplin
- Starring: Charlie Chaplin; Edna Purviance; Marion Feducha; Bob Kelly; Jackie Coogan; Tom Wilson; Babe London; Henry Bergman; Loyal Underwood
- Cinematography: Roland Totheroh
- Edited by: Charlie Chaplin (uncredited)
- Music by: Charlie Chaplin (in 1973 re-release)
- Production company: Charles Chaplin Productions
- Distributed by: First National Pictures Inc.
- Release date: December 15, 1919
- Running time: 25 min.
- Country: United States
- Languages: Silent film English (Original intertitles)

A Day's Pleasure (1919)

A Day's Pleasure (1919) is Charlie Chaplin's fourth film for First National Films. It was created at the Chaplin Studio. It was a quickly made two-reeler to help fill a gap while working on his first feature The Kid. It is about a day outing with his wife and the kids and things do not go smoothly. Edna Purviance plays Chaplin's wife and Jackie Coogan one of the kids. The first scene shows the Chaplin Studio corner office in the background while Chaplin tries to get his car started.

== Plot ==
After an initial scene featuring a Ford which is extremely reluctant to start, most of the action takes place on an excursion ferry. Gags revolve around seasickness, which Charlie, a fat couple, and even the boat's all-black ragtime band succumb to, deckchairs, and Charlie's comic pugnacity. This is followed by a scene of the family returning home, and encountering trouble at an intersection, which involves a traffic cop, and hot tar.

== Cast ==
- Charlie Chaplin as Father
- Edna Purviance as Mother

Uncredited Cast:

- C. Allen as Jazz Musician
- Naomi Bailey as Boat Passenger
- Sallie Barr as Boat Passenger
- Henry Bergman as Captain / Man in Car / Heavy Policeman
- True Boardman as Boy on Boat
- James Bryson as Boat Passenger
- Bliss Chevalier as Woman on Street
- Jackie Coogan as Smallest Boy
- Dixie Doll as Girl on Boat
- Charles S. Drew as Boat Passenger
- Elmer Ellsworth as Boat Passenger / Chauffeur
- Marion Feducha as Small Boy
- Leroy Finnegan as Boat Passenger
- Mrs. Fowler as Boat Passenger
- Warren Gilbert as Boat Passenger / Chauffeur
- J.A. Irvin as Jazz Musician
- Bob Kelly as Small Boy
- Toraichi Kono as Chauffeur
- Raymond Lee as Boy on Boat
- Babe London as Large Husband's Seasick Wife
- Nancy Mix as Boat Passenger
- Louise Muma as Boat Passenger
- Dorothy Oliver as Boat Passenger
- Alfred Reeves as Man on Street
- Charles Reisner as Man on Street
- Jean Riley as Boat Passenger
- Mrs. Roos as Boat Passenger
- Sylvia Sarto as Boat Passenger
- Elsie Sindora as Boat Passenger
- E. Sorral as Jazz Musician
- Arthur Thalasso as Boat Passenger
- California Truman as Old Woman on Street Corner
- Loyal Underwood as Sandwich Vendor on Boat / Angry Little Man in Street
- Joe Van Meter as Chauffeur
- Jessalyn Van Trump as Woman on Street Corner
- Virginia Ware as Woman on Street Corner
- John Williams as Jazz Musician
- Tom Wilson as Large Husband
- Tom Wood as Gangplank-Human with Baby Carriage
- Elsie Young as Boat Passenger
- K. Zimmerman as Boat Passenger

== Reception ==
A Day's Pleasure is almost universally regarded as Chaplin's least impressive First National film. Even contemporary critics were muted in their enthusiasm, as evidenced by this mixed review from The New York Times of December 8, 1919 :

"Charlie Chaplin is screamingly funny in his latest picture, A Day's Pleasure, at the Strand, when he tries in vain to solve the mysteries of a collapsible deck chair. He is also funny in many little bits of pantomime and burlesque, in which he is inimitable. But most of the time he depends for comedy upon seasickness, a Ford car, and biff-bang slap-stick, with which he is little, if any, funnier than many other screen comedians."
