= Hearts in Hock =

1919 film

- Directed by: Charley Chase
- Written by: Charles Parrott
- Produced by: Abe Stern; Julius Stern
- Starring: Oliver Hardy
- Release date: March 19, 1919
- Country: United States
- Languages: Silent film English intertitles

Hearts in Hock is a 1919 American silent comedy film featuring Oliver Hardy.

== Plot ==
This plot was filed with the original copyright application at the Library of Congress:

It all happened because a jewelry store was right next door to the court where Judge Barl E. Korn decided the momentous problems of Where, When and Who. Flippant Flossie was the sparkling jewel in the jewelry shop and was used to gentle treatment. Somebody lost a purse, and somebody, including Flossie, the judge's wife and Gumshoe Gus all had the purse. A trial took place and the purse was returned to the rightful owner after it was brought out in the evidence that Judge Barl E. Korn had given the purse to the thief.

This review and synopsis appeared in the April 5, 1919 The Moving Picture World:

A two-reel comic of the strictly knockabout, semi-burlesque type. The chief figure is a judge whose court is connected with a pawnbroker's establishment. A bomb is thrown into the court room from the latter establishment during a trial. This is a number of average quality, with some humorous moments of fair strength.

== Cast ==
- Oliver Hardy (as Babe Hardy)
- Peggy Prevost
- Jack Henderson
- Bartine Burkett
- Billy Armstrong

== See also ==
- List of American films of 1919
- Oliver Hardy filmography
