= The Weak-End Party =

1922 film

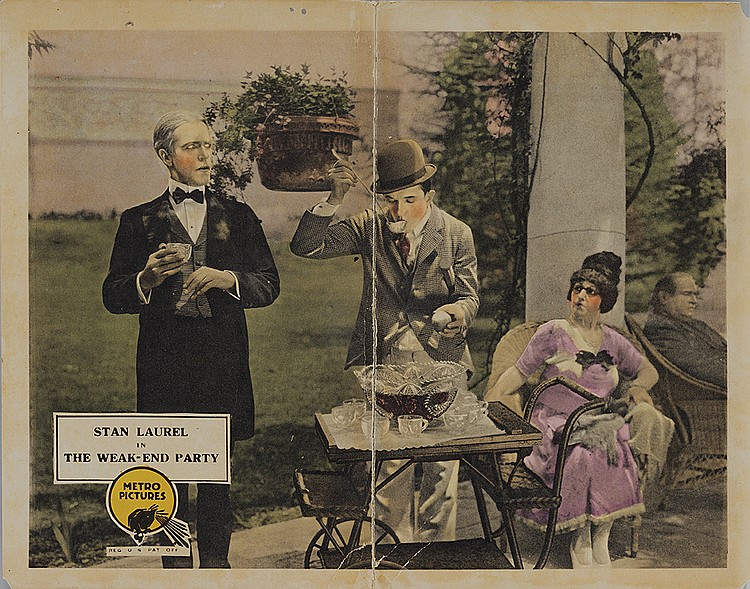
- Lobby card
- Directed by: Broncho Billy Anderson
- Produced by: Broncho Billy Anderson
- Starring: Stan Laurel
- Production company: Metro Pictures
- Release date: October 2, 1922
- Running time: 20 minutes
- Country: United States
- Languages: Silent; English intertitles

The Weak-End Party (1922)

The Weak-End Party is a 1922 American silent film featuring Stan Laurel. It had a working title of "The Gardener," and was titled on the surviving film as A Weak-End Party.

== Plot ==
Okuda and Niebaur write, "The plot deals with a society party where the number of dinner guests totals an odd and unlucky 13. Gardener Stanley is hastily tossed into the mix to make an even 14. Stan responds happily to this brief societal promotion and does his best to fit in. Meanwhile, Stanley's caretaker supervisor and one of the party guests are in cahoots to steal some rare jewels from the proprietors. Unwittingly, this is thwarted by Stan."

== Cast ==
- Stan Laurel as the gardener
- Marion Aye as Lily, the birthday girl
- Harry L. Rattenberry as Mr. Smith, her father
- Otto Fries as the overseer
- Colin Kenny as the Good Samaritan
- William Gillespie as Monocole Charlie
- Scotty MacGregor as Pinkerton Burns (as Scott MacGregor)
- Babe London as party guest

== See also ==
- List of American films of 1922
