= Surrender! =

1927 film

Surrender
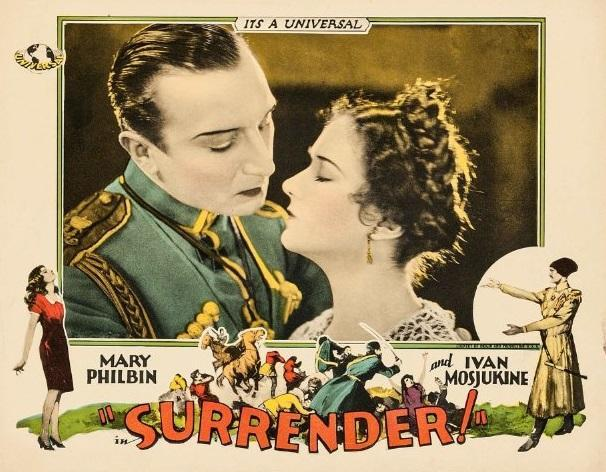
- Lobby card
- Directed by: Edward Sloman
- Screenplay by: Edward J. Montagne & Edward Sloman
- Based on: Lea Lyon by Alexander Brody
- Produced by: Paul Kohner (production supervision)
- Starring: Mary Philbin; Ivan Mosjukine
- Cinematography: Gilbert Warrenton
- Edited by: Edward Cahn
- Production company: Universal Pictures
- Distributed by: Universal Pictures
- Release date: November 3, 1927
- Running time: 80 minutes
- Country: United States
- Language: Silent (English intertitles)

Surrender is a 1927 American silent romantic drama film directed by Edward Sloman and written by Charles Kenyon, Edward J. Montagne and Albert DeMond. It is based on the 1915 play Lea Lyon by Alexander Brody. The film stars Mary Philbin, Ivan Mosjukine, Otto Matieson, Nigel De Brulier, Otto Fries, and Daniel Makarenko. The film was released on November 3, 1927, by Universal Pictures.

== Cast ==
- Mary Philbin as Lea Lyon
- Ivan Mosjukine as Constantine
- Nigel De Brulier as Rabbi Mendel Lyon
- Otto Matiesen as Joshua
- Otto Fries as Tarras
- Daniel Makarenko as General Davidoff
- Lassie Lou Ahern as Little Jewish Girl (uncredited)
- John Bleifer as Peasant Farmer (uncredited)
- Russ Powell as Tavern Keeper (uncredited)

== Preservation ==
Prints of Surrender! are in film collections of the Library of Congress, Cineteca Del Friuli (Gemona), Steven Spielberg Jewish Film Archive, and Library and Archives Canada.
