= Vivian Marshall =

American diver, vaudeville performer and film actress

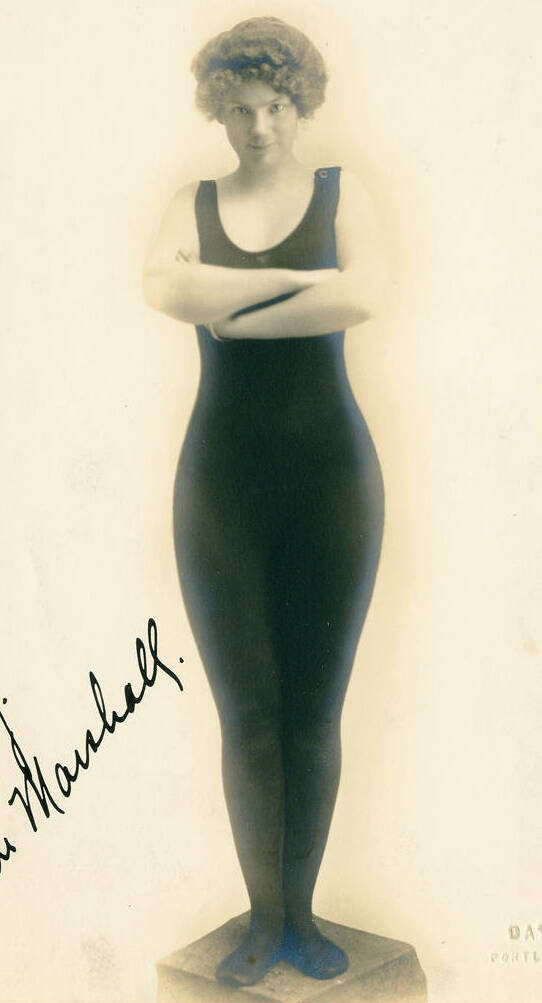
- Marshall, circa 1913
- Born: March 18, 1888; Burbank, California, US
- Died: May 18, 1969 (aged 81); Santa Cruz County, California
- Other names: Vivian Fries (1914–1938); Vivian Millett (1958–69)
- Occupations: Vaudeville performer, film actress
- Years active: 1913–1918
- Spouse(s): Otto Fries (1914–1938, his death); Ray Millet (1958–1965, his death)
- Children: Ottilie Vivian Ewer (1918–2008); Sherwood Fries (1920–1986)

Vivian Augustus Marshall (later Fries and Millett, March 18, 1888 – May 18, 1969) was an American diver, vaudeville performer and film actress. Born in California, Marshall's family moved to Oregon during her youth and she gained notoriety for her aquatic skills while a member of the Multnomah Athletic Club in Portland and later performed public stunt dives from heights of 70 feet and above. She also performed a signature stunt called the "fire dive", in which she would douse her baiting suit in wood alcohol, light it with a match and perform a high dive into the water to extinguish the flames. Marshall worked for vaudeville producer Alexander Pantages and acted in motion pictures in Los Angeles, California. She was married to actor Otto Fries and they had two children, Sherwood Marshall and Ottilie Vivian.

== Biography ==
Vivian Marshall was born on March 18, 1888, in Burbank, California to Rudolph Augustus and Emma Seckle Marshall (née Fleming). Rudolph Marshall was a building contractor, law clerk and founder of the San Leandro Reporter in San Leandro, California. Emma Marshall was a writer and devoted much of her time to organizing social club gatherings. The family lived in Oakland, California for a time before moving to Oregon during Vivian Marshall's childhood. She attended St. Helens Hall in Portland, Oregon.

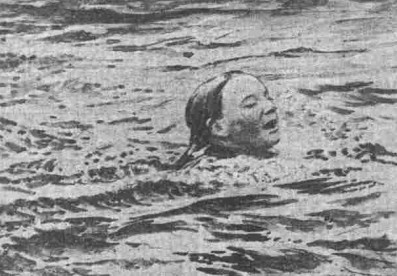
Marshall swimming in the Willamette River in 1906.

In 1906, Vivian Marshall first gained local attention for swimming from the docks at Captain Bundy's Bath House in Oregon City to the west side of the Willamette River and back without resting. The trip took 30 minutes, which The Oregonian noted was the quickest recorded time by a female swimmer. Marshall was accompanied by W. L. Murray and her father R. A. Marshall in a lifesaving boat during the swim. In 1908, Marshall embarked on a six-month trip around the United States. She was sent to music school in New York in 1910 for a six-month period which was capped by her singing at the Waldorf Astoria Hotel. Marshall spent over a year in Europe—from 1910 to 1911—where she studied music at stops in Berlin, London and Paris. In 1912, while in Gearhart, Oregon, Marshall first performed the "fire dive"; in which she would soak her baiting suit in wood alcohol, light it and high dive into the water to extinguish the flames. She took first place during the 25 yard swim and the springboard during the Oregon State Swimming and Diving Championships in April 1912. That year, Marshall was hired by the Multnomah Athletic Club to instruct the female diving and swimming pupils and performed her fire dive for the Pacific Northwest Indoor Diving Championships in November.

In January 1913, Marshall was invited to perform her signature fire dive at the Seattle Athletic Club in Seattle, Washington for vaudeville producer Alexander Pantages. According to The Oregonian, after witnessing the performance Pantages immediately offered Marshall a deal to join his vaudeville circuit. Her first contract with Pantages was for nine weeks beginning in Seattle, Washington. In February 1913, Marshall performed a publicity stunt in which she dove 75 feet from the 11th Street Bridge in Tacoma, Washington into the icy City Waterway below and swam 100 yards to a boat launch. Following the dive, she told The Oregonian, "I never would have undertaken my high dive in Tacoma last week head I realized the chances I was taking of doing myself bodily harm and from now I doubt if I will ever attempt such a feat again." She performed in Portland, Oregon for the first time on February 10, 1913 along with Nellie Schmidt in a swimming and diving performance at Pantages Theater. Promotional billboards in Tacoma for Pantages' vaudeville show that featured Marshall and other divers was criticized by Tacoma Mayor William Wolcott Seymour as obscene and he ordered the city's public safety commissioner to remove them in August 1913.

Marshall's first international vaudeville performance came in April 1913 aboard the steamer SS Mount McKinley, which was docked off the Coronado Islands in Mexico. In October 1913, Marshall traveled to Australia with Nellie Schmidt to perform their diving act. Due to popular demand, Marshall's appearance at Portland's Pantages Theater was extended by a week in May 1914. That year, she married fellow entertainer Otto Fries in Spokane, Washington. Marshall appeared in her first motion picture in 1915. The film, entitled He Got Himself a Wife, was produced by Vitagraph Studios and due to an error in post-production her credit was omitted despite being prominently featured. The studio sent out corrections to certain publications like The Moving Picture World and the Los Angeles Herald and asked them to credit Marshall when they wrote about the film. In 1917, Marshall entered into contract with Fox Film in Edendale, California for character work in motion pictures. Marshall's daughter, Ottilie Vivian, appeared in the film Training for Husbands in 1920 at seven months old. Marshall's son, Sherwood Marshall Fries, was born in 1920 and went on to play in the National Football League in 1943.

On August 24, 1958, Marshall married retired mail carrier Ray Millet of Palm Springs, California. The two lived in Capitola, California until his death on September 30, 1965. Marshall died on May 18, 1969, in Santa Cruz County, California and was interred at the Hollywood Forever Cemetery in Hollywood.

== Filmography ==
- He Got Himself a Wife (1915)
- Masks and Mishaps (1917)
- By the Sad Sea Waves (1917)
