= By the Sad Sea Waves =

1917 film

- Full film
- Directed by: Alfred J. Goulding
- Written by: H. M. Walker
- Produced by: Hal Roach
- Starring: Harold Lloyd
- Cinematography: Walter Lundin
- Release date: September 30, 1917
- Country: United States
- Languages: Silent; English intertitles

By the Sad Sea Waves is a 1917 American short comedy film featuring Harold Lloyd.

== Plot ==
Trying to woo Bebe on a beach, Harold impersonates a life guard. Among his misadventures, Harold is wrongly credited with saving two male swimmers from drowning but he eventually does rescue Bebe.

== Cast ==
- Harold Lloyd
- Snub Pollard
- Bebe Daniels
- Frank Alexander as Bather
- William Blaisdell
- Sammy Brooks
- Rudolph Bylek
- Billy Fay (as William Fay)
- Florence Gibson
- Clyde E. Hopkins
- Oscar Larson
- Gus Leonard
- Vivian Marshall
- Belle Mitchell
- Fred C. Newmeyer
- Dorothea Wolbert (as Dorothy Wolbert)

== See also ==
- List of American films of 1917
- Harold Lloyd filmography
