= Scrambled Brains =

1951 film by Jules White

- Directed by: Jules White
- Written by: Felix Adler
- Produced by: Jules White
- Starring: Moe Howard; Larry Fine; Shemp Howard; Babe London; Vernon Dent; Emil Sitka
- Cinematography: Henry Freulich
- Edited by: Edwin H. Bryant
- Distributed by: Columbia Pictures
- Release date: July 7, 1951 (U.S.)
- Running time: 15:43
- Country: United States
- Language: English

Scrambled Brains is a 1951 short subject directed by Jules White starring American slapstick comedy team The Three Stooges (Moe Howard, Larry Fine and Shemp Howard). It is the 132nd entry in the series released by Columbia Pictures starring the comedians, who released 190 shorts for the studio between 1934 and 1959.

== Plot ==
Moe and Larry find themselves at a sanatorium where their friend Shemp is undergoing treatment for hallucinations. Despite Shemp's insistence on bidding farewell to his new fiancée, Nurse Nora, before his premature discharge, Moe and Larry are taken aback when they meet her, as she does not match Shemp's glowing description. It becomes apparent that Shemp's condition is far from resolved, necessitating further therapy.

Upon returning home, the trio receives a visit from Dr. Gesundheit, whose visual impairment complicates his efforts to treat Shemp. Despite the doctor's attempts to administer medication, Shemp adamantly refuses. Subsequently, Shemp experiences hallucinations during a piano lesson, exacerbating his mental state and intensifying his desire to marry Nora.

During their journey to visit the doctor, the Stooges become entangled in a physical altercation in a phone booth with a stranger, resulting in a chaotic scene and the accidental destruction of groceries. The altercation concludes with the phone booth overturning, allowing the Stooges to escape.

Upon returning home, the Stooges encounter Nora waiting for her father, who coincidentally happens to be the man involved in the earlier altercation. In their attempt to flee, the Stooges inadvertently knock themselves unconscious, mistaking a window silhouette for an exit. Nora then claims Shemp as her own, leading to his departure with her.

== Cast ==
- Moe Howard as Moe
- Larry Fine as Larry
- Shemp Howard as Shemp
- Babe London as Nora
  - Pamela Britton as pretty Nora
- Vernon Dent as Nora's father
- Emil Sitka as Dr. Gesundheit
- Royce Milne as Little Mary Belle
- Johnny Kascier as orderly

== Production notes ==
Scrambled Brains was filmed on March 21–23, 1950, 16 months before it was released. Larry Fine often cited this film as his all-time favorite, with You Nazty Spy! and Cuckoo on a Choo Choo his runners-up. He would often screen this film during his last days residing at the Motion Picture & Television Country House and Hospital.

The gag of making a doll whine by leaning a rocking chair on it was borrowed from Laurel and Hardy's 1940 film Saps at Sea.
