= Sherwood Fries =

American football player (1920–1986)

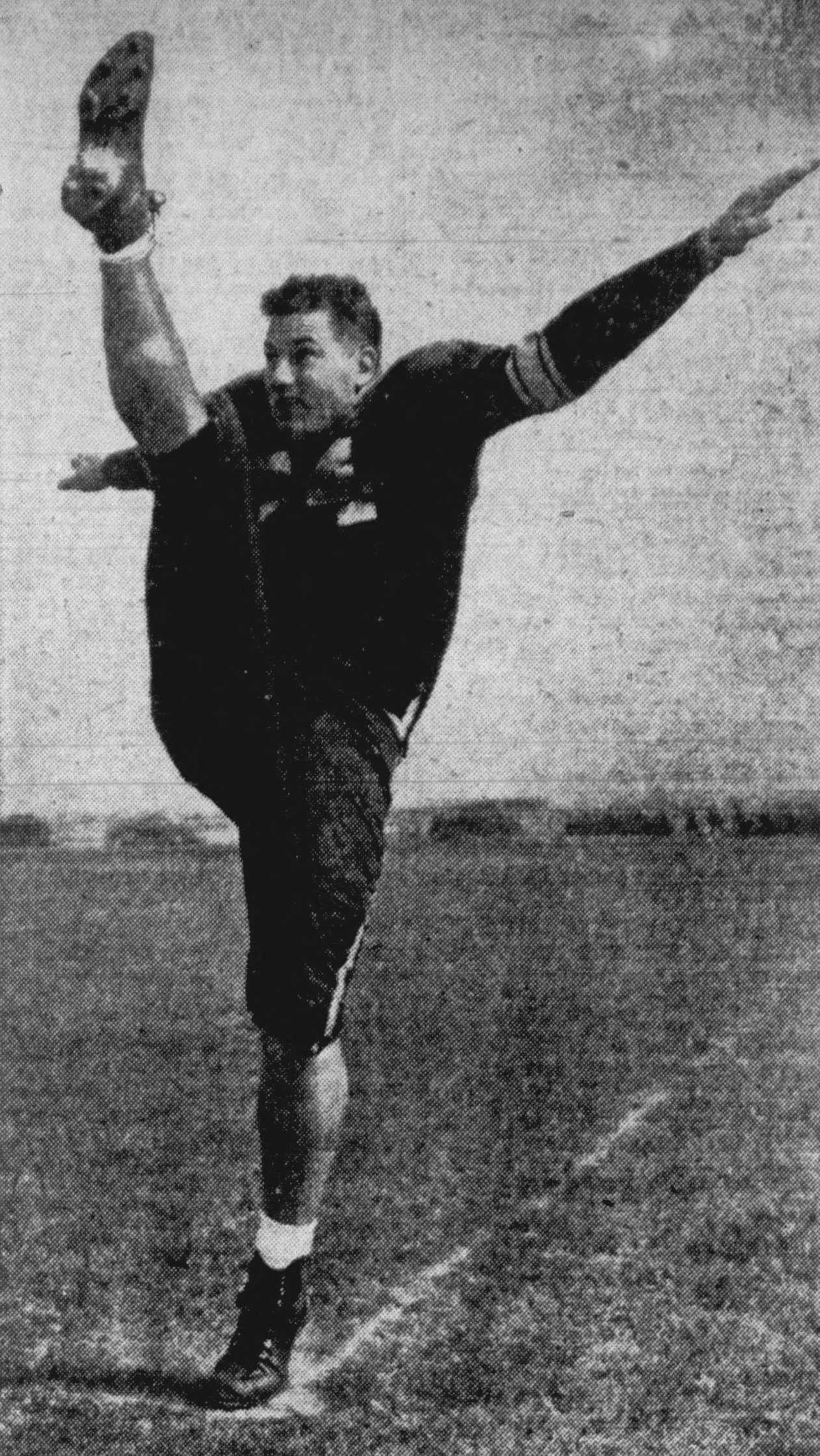
- Fries, circa 1944

No. 46
- Position: Guard

Personal information
- Born: November 14, 1920; Los Angeles, California, U.S.
- Died: December 9, 1986 (aged 66); San Juan Capistrano, California, U.S.
- Listed height: 6 ft 1 in (1.85 m)
- Listed weight: 235 lb (107 kg)

Career information
- High school: Fairfax (California)
- College: Colorado State

Career history
- Green Bay Packers (1943)

Career statistics
- Games played: 5
- Interceptions: 2
- Stats at Pro Football Reference

Sherwood Marshall Fries (November 24, 1920 – December 9, 1986) was a guard for the Green Bay Packers of the National Football League (NFL) during the 1943 season.

== Biography ==
Fries was born on November 24, 1920, in Los Angeles, California. Fries was the son of actors Otto Fries and Vivian Marshall. Sherwood Fries attended Fairfax High School, where he played football and competed in shotput. He set a Western League (now named CIF Los Angeles City Section) record in 1939 with a 59 foot shotput throw.

Fries played at the collegiate level at the Colorado State University, where he primarily played punter and placekicker, but he was occasionally utilized as a guard. During a game against the New Mexico Lobos on October 27, 1940, Fries had two 85 yard punts. Colorado State won the game 7–6. Fries also played baseball for Colorado State. He was selected to the Associated Press Mountain States Athletic Conference All-Second-team as a pitcher in 1941. He played with the Green Bay Packers as a guard during the 1943 NFL season. In 1944, Fries played football for the San Diego Sailors of Naval Station, San Diego. He was the Sailors' starting left tackle and punter.

Fries placed second in shotput during a United States Navy track and field competition in Hawaii in May 1945. In 1947, Fries played semi-professional baseball for the Fort Collins Elks of Fort Collins, Colorado. Fries returned to Colorado State University in 1948 where he coached swimming and played for the school's baseball team as a pitcher and right fielder.

In 1952, Fries moved to Mitchell, Nebraska, where he managed the municipal pool and coached football at Mitchell High School.
