= The Turning Point (1920 film) =

1920 film

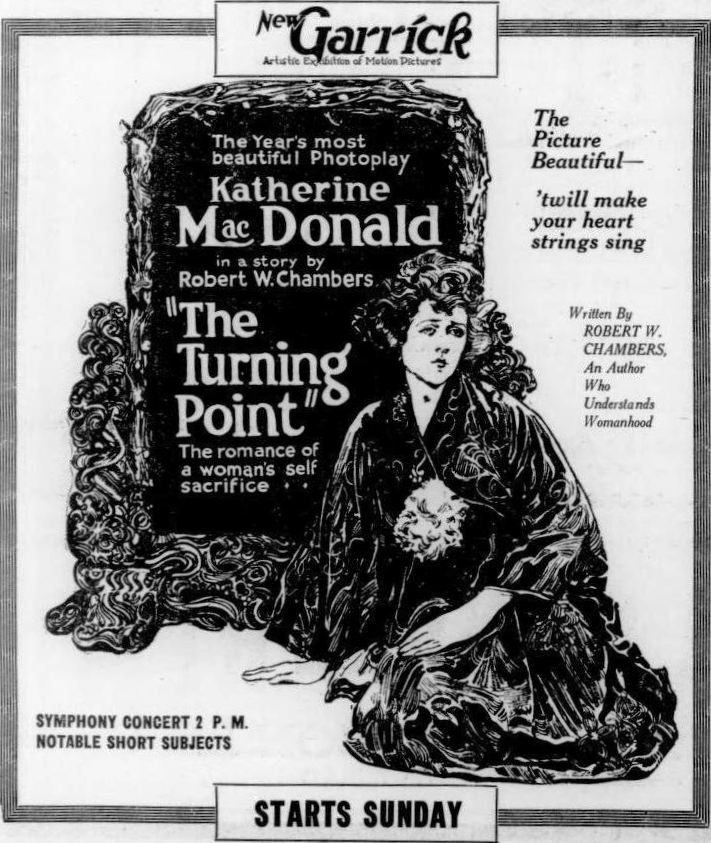
- Advertisement
- Directed by: J.A. Barry
- Based on: The Turning Point by Robert W. Chambers
- Produced by: Katherine MacDonald
- Starring: Katherine MacDonald; Leota Lorraine; Nigel Barrie; William V. Mong; Bartine Burkett; William Clifford
- Cinematography: Joseph Brotherton
- Production company: Katherine MacDonald Pictures Corporation
- Distributed by: First National Exhibitors' Circuit
- Release date: February 2, 1920
- Running time: 50 minutes
- Country: United States
- Language: Silent (English intertitles)

The Turning Point is a 1920 American silent drama film directed by J.A. Barry, written by Robert W. Chambers, and starring Katherine MacDonald, Leota Lorraine, Nigel Barrie, William V. Mong, Bartine Burkett, and William Clifford. It was released on February 2, 1920, by First National Exhibitors' Circuit.

== Cast ==
- Katherine MacDonald as Diana Tennant
- Leota Lorraine as Silvette Tennant
- Nigel Barrie as James Edgerton
- William V. Mong as Mr. Rivett
- Bartine Burkett as Christine Rivett
- William Clifford as Col. Follis Curmew
- William Colvin as Jerry
- Kenneth Harlan as Jack Rivett
- Walter Hiers as Billy Inwood
- Marion McDonald as Maid
- Hedda Nova as Mrs. Wemyss
- Edith Yorke as Mrs. Rivett

== Preservation status ==
- This film is now lost.
