= The Handy Man (1923 film) =

1923 film

- Directed by: Robert P. Kerr
- Written by: Bob Munson
- Produced by: Broncho Billy Anderson
- Starring: Stan Laurel
- Cinematography: Irving G. Ries
- Release date: March 12, 1923
- Running time: 20 minutes
- Country: United States
- Languages: Silent; English intertitles

The Handy Man is a 1923 American silent comedy film featuring Stan Laurel.

== Plot ==
This plot summary comes from Motion Picture World for March 24, 1923:

The handy man pays ardent attention to the plump cook, who is really the lost wife of a mysterious stranger. He finds out in time to divorce her. The fat heroine supplies much of the comedy, which will amuse those who like obvious effects. It should be booked with careful regard for your patrons' tastes in comedy, as it will be most appreciated by devoted admirers of Stan Laurel and of rather broad humor.

This description comes from the original 1923 Library of Congress copyright filing for the film:

The 250 pound cook at the Stilwell country estate is quite a belle and the 125 pound handy man is something of a dumb-bell. The cook is an extremely flirtatious creature and the handy man is a miserable victim of her many charms. As the two are busy with their love making on the back porch, the overseer notices a picture of the cook in the paper with the legend that a $100,000.- inheritance awaits her. Immediately he becomes interested and sends the handy man about his work while he makes overtures to the cook. The fickle young thing welcomes his attentions. In the meanwhile the handy man proceeds to water the flowers, as well as the overseer and the cook.

The Man of Mystery sees it all!

In the afternoon, the Stilwells give a musicale, and as the sweet strains float into the kitchen, the handy man appears. Overcome by the music, the erstwhile lovers make up. And soon they are dancing merrily into the drawing room, and back into the kitchen again. There the overseer finds them in passionate embrace. But the handy man pretends he is investigating a mouse trap. And in his embarrassment he takes the mouse trap into the drawing room where all the mice escape.

In the meanwhile, the overseer resumes his position as chief shiek to the cook, and soon the winsome baby elephant is swinging happily in the orchard under the motive power of the overseer — that is until the handy man cuts the rope in the course of his duty of pruning the trees.

Again the cook's heart turns and the handy man persuades her to elope in his motorcycle and trailer. On the way the bottom of the trailer drops out and the cook has considerable difficulty in keep apace with the vehicle on foot. And the overseer is hot on the trail.

The Man of Mystery sees it all.

After many mishaps the elopers arrive at the office of the combination Justice of the Peace, Divorce attorney and undertaker. Of course, the handy man has no ring, and as he goes out to buy it the Justice of the Peace sees that the cook is the original of the picture in the paper. And $100,000.- awaits her. When the handy man returns he finds his fickle sweetheart in the arms of the judge. The overseer comes in; then the Man of Mystery. The cook rushes into his arms, calling him husband. The others are astounded. Then follows a mallet free-for-all in which each is beaned on the head by the other. Finally the handy man has laid them all out, and as he exits in disgust, a great clock falls on his head. He goes gently to sleep dreaming of the little daisies in the fields.

— Bob Munson

== Cast ==
- Stan Laurel as The handy man
- Merta Sterling as The cook
- Otto Fries as The overseer
- Harry Mann as A mysterious stranger
- Babe London as A house guest

== See also ==
- List of American films of 1923
