= Chai Hong (actor) =

Korea-born actor and comedian

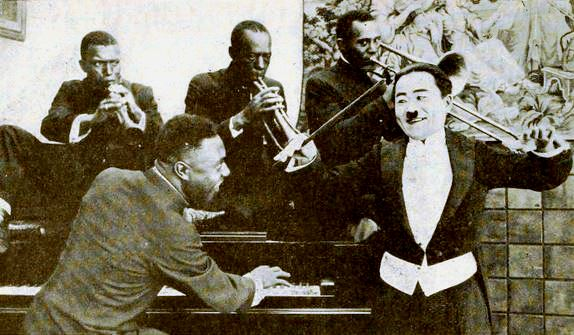
- Chai Hong and the Darktown Strutters (1919)
- Born: Chai Young Hong; 26 November 1882 or 1885; Korea
- Died: 4 January 1946; New York, USA
- Occupations: Actor, comedian
- Years active: 1918-1922

Chai Hong (often billed as Charlie from the Orient) was a Korean-born actor and comedian who appeared in a string of Hollywood comedies during the silent era. He was often referred to as "the Chinese Charlie Chaplin".

== Biography ==
Chai Hong was born in 1885 and subsequently raised by his grandmother, according to information he gave "Screenland" columnist Ogden Lawrence. He eventually immigrated to Hawaii and later to Los Angeles. After working as a bellboy at the Hotel Alexandria, he broke into Hollywood after being scouted by L-KO. He appeared in more than 20 films between 1918 and 1922; According to author Thomas Reeder, Hong was working as Lew Cody's valet and houseman mid-1925. Researcher Jesse Brisson feels pretty positive he later went by the name "Chester Hong," moved to New York City, and worked as a cook. A WWII draft reg. card for Chester Hong states he was born 26 Nov 1885 in "Yang Sang" [Yangsan?], Korea (WWI DRC gives "nearest relative" as [U or J]. S. Lea of Yangsan, "Corea" [sic]"). Unemployed. Stats: 5'0", 130, brown eyes, black hair, dark complexion, "Limps - uses cane." Chester served as a cook aboard the SS Thomas Lynch during WWII. While in this capacity, 135-pound Hong was "seriously assaulted" by a 200-pound seaman serving aboard who had continually been in fights with other crewmen and even the "Bo's'n." The master and chief mate of the vessel reportedly did not follow proper protocol in disciplining the known troublemaker. Hong sued and was awarded $3,000. Chester Hong died on 4 January 1946 in Manhattan, New York City, New York, USA

== Selected filmography ==
- The Snowshoe Trail (1922)
- Fighting Bill (1921)
- Hearts of the West (1920)
- Mamma's Boy (1920)
- Brownie, the Peacemaker (1920)
- Over the Ocean Waves (1920)
- Charlie Gets a Job (1919)
- A Barnyard Romance (1919)
- A Tight Fix (1919)
- A Popular Villain (1919)
- An Oriental Romeo (1919)
- Charlie, the Hero (1919)
- A Pair of Deuces (1919)
- Elmo, the Mighty (1919)
- The Star Boarder (1919)
- Good Night, Turk (1919)
- Charlie in Turkey (1919)
- The Freckled Fish (1919)
- Charlie, the Little Daredevil (1919)
- A Clean Sweep (1918)
- Romance and Dynamite (1918)
- The Blind Pig (1918)
