= Elmo the Mighty =

1919 film by Henry MacRae and J. P. McGowan

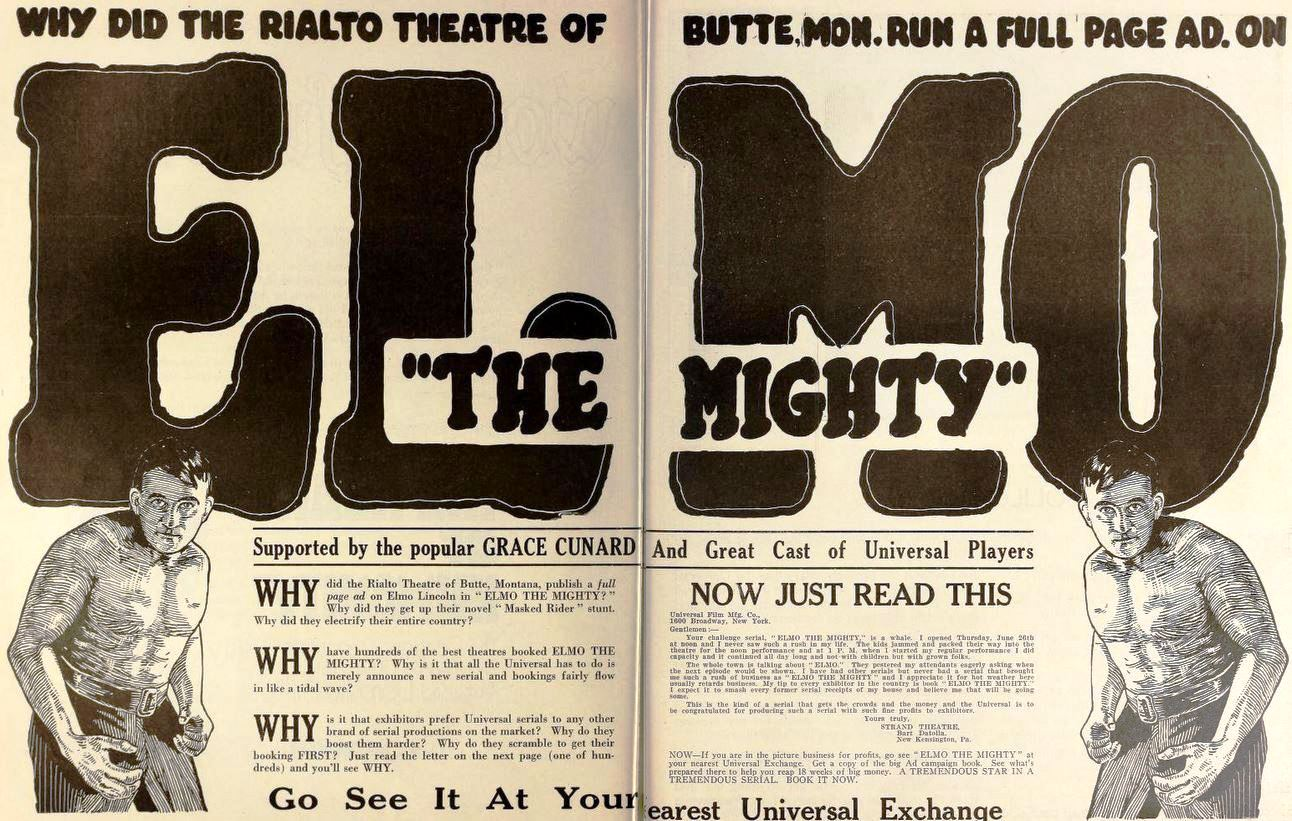
- Promotion in Motion Picture News, 1919
- Directed by: Henry MacRae; J. P. McGowan
- Produced by: Great Western Producing Company
- Starring: Elmo Lincoln; Grace Cunard
- Cinematography: A. McClain
- Distributed by: Universal Film Manufacturing Company; Société des Etablissements L. Gaumont (France; 1920)
- Release date: June 16, 1919
- Running time: 18 episodes
- Country: United States
- Languages: Silent; English intertitles

Elmo the Mighty is a 1919 American silent film serial directed by Henry MacRae and J. P. McGowan. The film is now considered to be lost.

== Cast ==
- Elmo Lincoln as Captain Elmo Armstrong
- Grace Cunard as Lucille Gray
- Fred Starr
- Virginia Kraft
- Ivor McFadden
- James Cole
- Rex De Rosselli
- William Orlamond
- Bob Reeves
- Madge Hunt
- Grace McLean
- William N. Chapman (credited as W.H. Chapman)
- Chai Hong

== See also ==
- List of American films of 1919
- List of film serials
- List of film serials by studio
- List of lost films
