= Curses! (film) =

1925 film

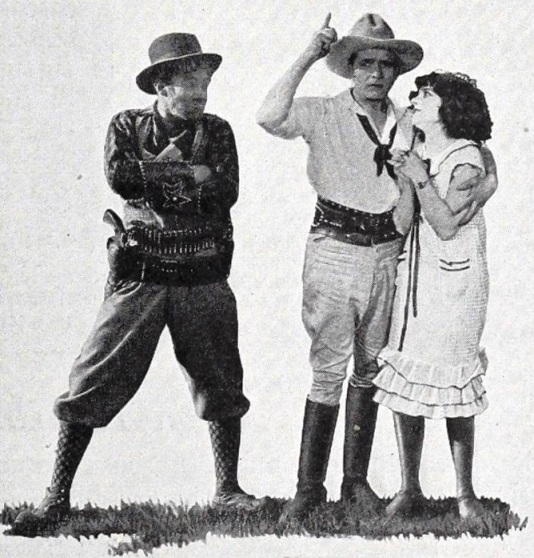
- Still from a 1925 magazine
- Directed by: William Goodrich (Roscoe Arbuckle); Grover Jones
- Written by: William Goodrich (Roscoe Arbuckle)
- Produced by: Buster Keaton (uncredited)
- Starring: Al St. John
- Production company: Reel Comedies Inc.
- Distributed by: Educational Pictures
- Release date: May 17, 1925
- Running time: 18 minutes
- Country: United States
- Language: Silent (English intertitles)

Curses! is a 1925 American silent comedy film directed by Roscoe Arbuckle as William Goodrich and Grover Jones. Although Arbuckle was acquitted in the third trial for the death of Virginia Rappe, he could not obtain work in Hollywood under his own name, so he adopted the pseudonym William Goodrich for directing the comedy shorts he made under his contract with Educational Film Exchanges.

== Cast ==
- Al St. John as Buttonshoe Bill
- Bartine Burkett as Little Nell

== See also ==
- List of American films of 1925
