= Abe Stern =

American film producer

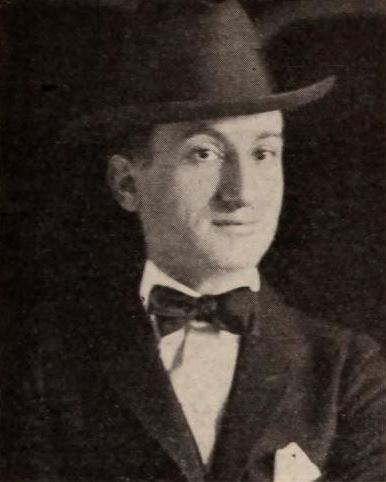
- From a 1920 magazine
- Born: March 8, 1888; Fulda, Germany
- Died: July 12, 1951 (aged 63); Los Angeles County, California, United States
- Years active: 1917-1929

Abe Stern (March 8, 1888 – July 12, 1951) was an American film producer. He produced 542 films between 1917 and 1929. He was a co-founder of Universal Studios.

He was born in Fulda, Germany, and died in Los Angeles County, California. He was the brother of producer Julius Stern and the brother-in-law of Universal Studios co-founder Carl Laemmle. He was entombed at Home of Peace Cemetery.

== Selected filmography ==
- Business Before Honesty (1918)
- Hello Trouble (1918)
- Painless Love (1918)
- The King of the Kitchen (1918)
- Hop, the Bellhop (1919)
- The Freckled Fish (1919)
- Lions and Ladies (1919)
- Hearts in Hock (1919)
- Laughing Gas (1920)
