= Merta Sterling =

American actress

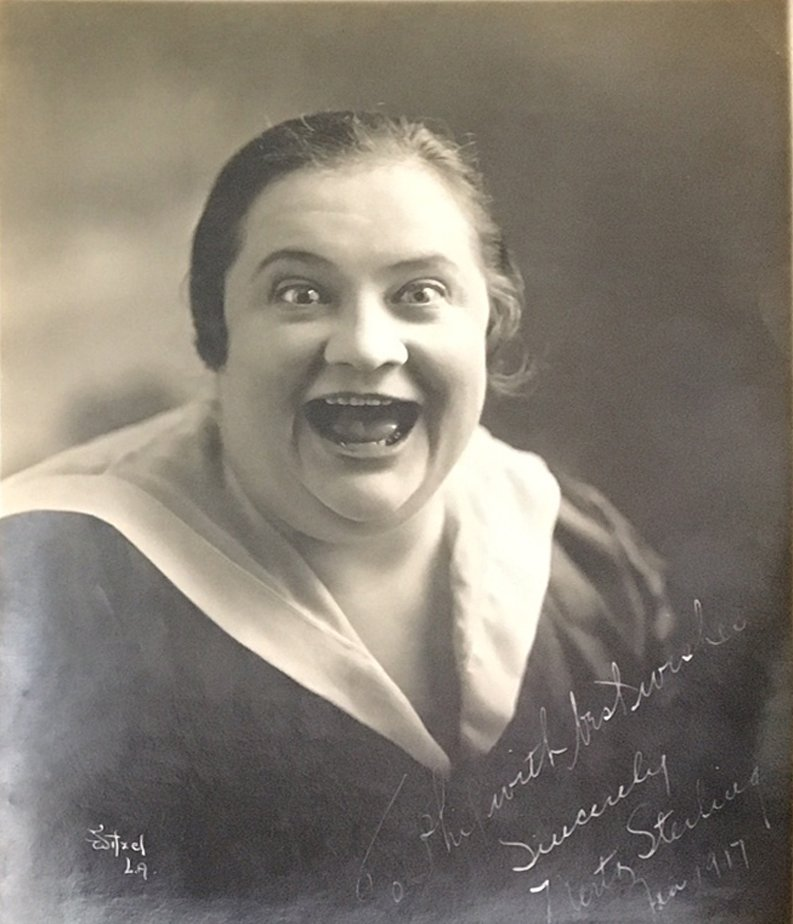
- Sterling in 1917
- Born: June 13, 1883; Manitowoc, Wisconsin, US
- Died: March 14, 1944 (aged 60); Hollywood, California, US
- Other names: Myrta Sterling; Myrtle Sterling
- Occupation: Actress
- Years active: 1914–1927

Merta Sterling (June 13, 1883 – March 14, 1944) was an American film actress of the silent era who predominantly appeared in comedic roles. She appeared in more than 60 films between 1914 and 1927. She was born Manitowoc, Wisconsin and died in Hollywood, California.

== Selected filmography ==
Year	Title	Role	Notes
1917	Lonesome Luke, Lawyer		Short
1917	Fat and Furious	Merta	
1918	Clean Sweep	The Lady Barber	Short
1918	The King of the Kitchen		Short
1919	The Janitor	Hefty Hilda	
1919	The Sage-Brush League		
1920	Up in Mary's Attic	Lena Gerst	
1923	The Handy Man	The cook	Short
1923	Scorching Sands		Short
1924	Darwin Was Right	Liza	
1924	Women First	Mandy Lee	
1924	The Star Dust Trail	The Maid	
1927	Paid to Love	Maid	
