= Craig Hutchinson =

American film director

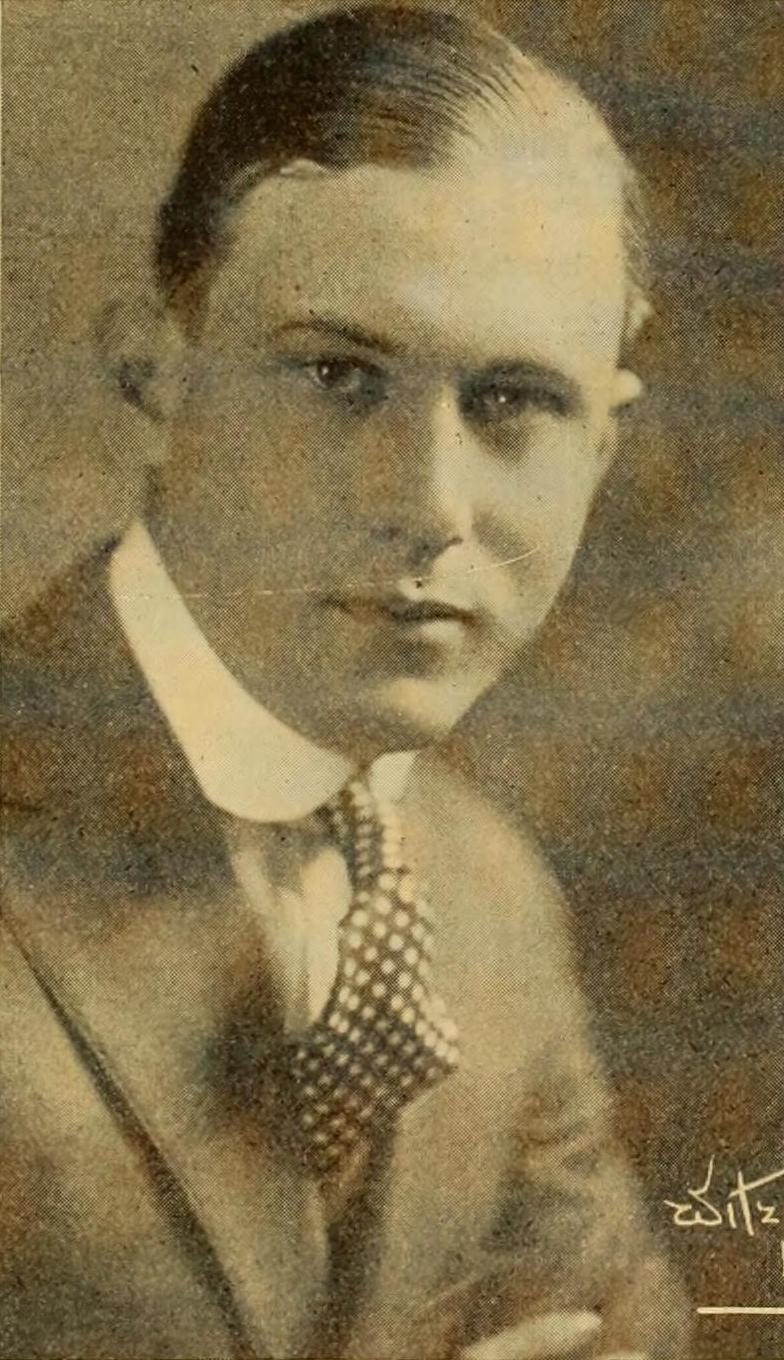
- Hutchinson c. 1916
- Born: June 23, 1891; Austin, Minnesota, USA
- Died: February 1976
- Years active: 1914-1928

Craig Hutchinson (June 23, 1891 – February 1976) was an American director and screenwriter. He directed more than 80 films between 1915 and 1928. He also wrote for 33 films between 1914 and 1927. He was born in Austin, Minnesota.

== Selected filmography ==
- A Film Johnnie (1914)
- His Favorite Pastime (1914)
- Cruel, Cruel Love (1914)
- The Star Boarder (1914)
- Fatty and the Heiress (1914)
- Whose Zoo? (1918)
- Dark and Cloudy (1919), wrote and directed
