= Hello Trouble (1918 film) =

1918 film

- Surviving footage from Hello Trouble
- Directed by: Charley Chase
- Produced by: Abe Stern; Julius Stern
- Starring: Oliver Hardy
- Production company: L-KO Kompany
- Distributed by: Universal Film Manufacturing Company
- Release date: September 25, 1918
- Running time: 2 reels
- Country: United States
- Language: Silent (English intertitles)

Hello Trouble is a 1918 American silent comedy film featuring Oliver Hardy. Like many American films of the time, Hello Trouble was subject to cuts by city and state film censorship boards. For example, the Chicago Board of Censors required a cut, in Reel 2, of eight scenes with a couple in a sliding bed.

== Cast ==
- Oliver Hardy as A devoted husband (credited as Babe Hardy)
- Peggy Prevost as His devoted wife
- Billy Armstrong as A romantic husband
- Bartine Burkett as His devoted wife
- Charles Inslee as A dishonest undertaker
- Fay Holderness as A foxy spinster
- Charley Chase

== See also ==
- List of American films of 1918
