= One Stolen Night (1923 film) =

1923 film

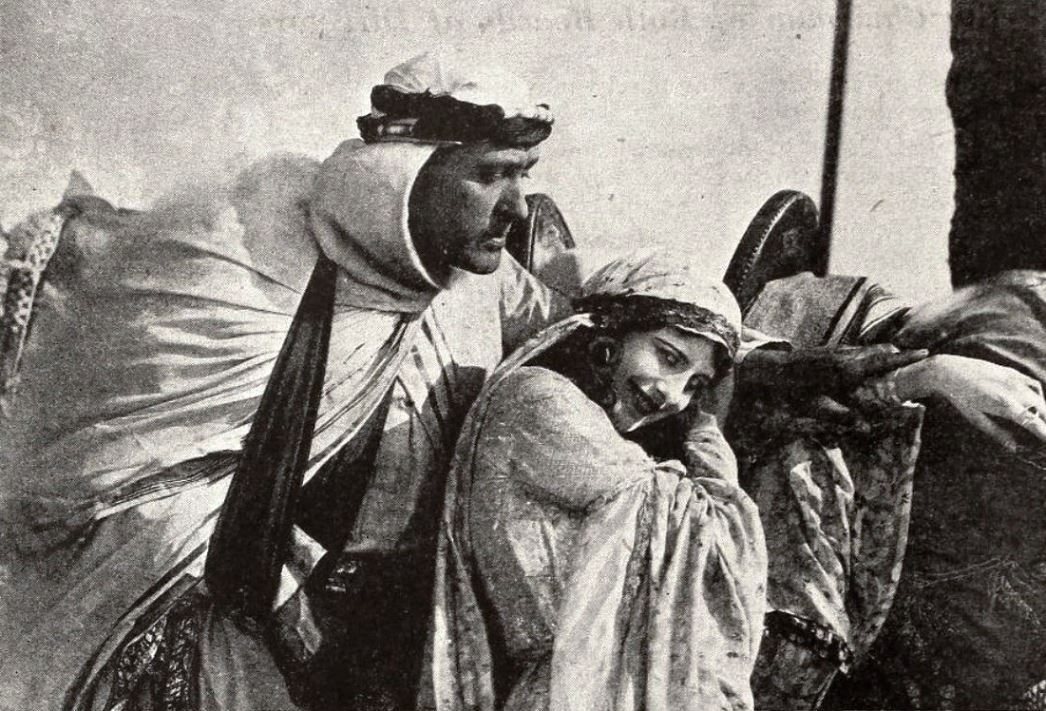
- Film still
- Directed by: Robert Ensminger
- Written by: Bradley J. Smollen
- Based on: "The Arab" by D.D. Calhoun
- Starring: Alice Calhoun; Herbert Heyes; Otto Hoffman
- Cinematography: W. Steve Smith Jr.
- Production company: Vitagraph Company of America
- Distributed by: Vitagraph Company of America
- Release date: January 29, 1923
- Running time: 50 minutes
- Country: United States
- Language: Silent (English intertitles)

One Stolen Night is a 1923 American silent drama film directed by Robert Ensminger and starring Alice Calhoun, Herbert Heyes, and Otto Hoffman. Based on the short story The Arab by D.D. Calhoun, it was remade in 1929 as a sound film of the same title.

== Plot ==
As described in a film magazine, Diantha Ebberly and her parents go to Touggourt, a city on the edge of the Sahara Desert, where she is to meet and wed Herbert Medford. All the parties concerned are from Boston. Betrothed to Herbert when a child, Diantha has not seen him in several years. The marriage is purely an arranged family affair and she has no particular liking for her fiancée. At Beni Mora, at the edge of the desert, their train is delayed by a breakdown. Diantha visits the bazaars and is separated from her parents. Beset by beggars, a tall Arab man rescues her and escorts her to the hotel, but disappears before she can introduce him to her people.

The love of adventure leads Diantha to dress as a young Arabian woman and she visits a dance hall and joins the festivities. The tall Arab man appears and makes love to her. Outlaw Bedouins seize Diantha, overpower the tall man, and take her to an ancient temple, where Sheik Amud declares that he will add her to his list of wives. Abdullah, the tall Arabian man, follows the trail which leads to Amud's harem. He overpowers the guard, chokes Amud, and returns with Diantha to the town.

Abdullah rides off after leaving Diantha in safety. On the following day her fiancée arrives. To her amazement, Diantha discovers that he is the man she knew as Abdullah, as his secret work required him to adopt local clothing and manners. She now sees that her marriage will be far happier than she imagined.

== Cast ==
- Alice Calhoun as Diantha Ebberly
- Herbert Heyes as Herbert Medford
- Otto Hoffman as Horace Ebberly
- Adele Farrington as Mrs. Ebberly
- Russ Powell as Sheik Amud

== Preservation ==
An incomplete copy of One Stolen Night is reportedly held by a private collector.

== Bibliography ==
- Goble, Alan. The Complete Index to Literary Sources in Film. Walter de Gruyter, 1999.
