= One Stolen Night (1929 film) =

1929 film

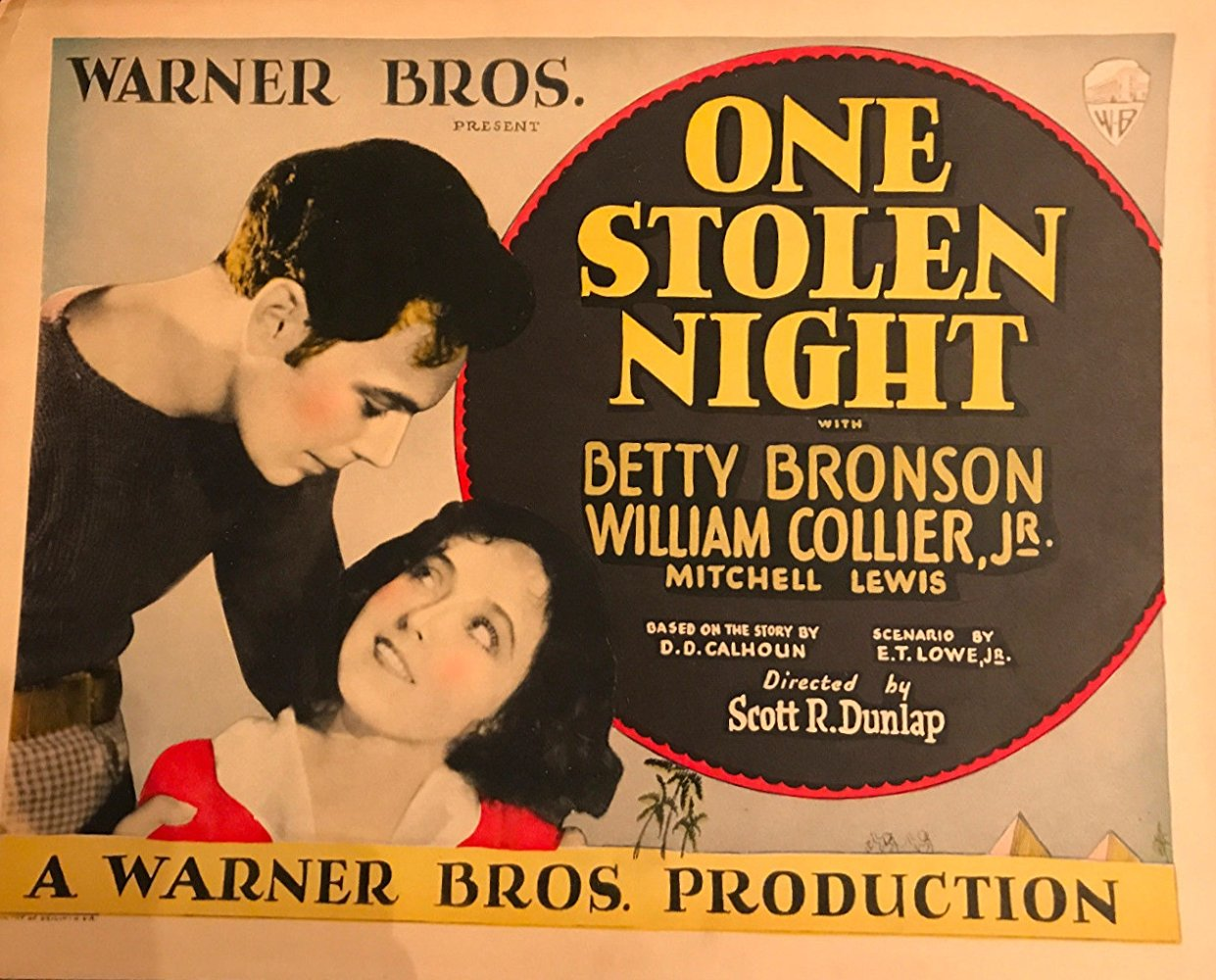
- Lobby card
- Directed by: Scott R. Dunlap
- Written by: Edward T. Lowe Jr. (dialogue, scenario and titles)
- Based on: The Arab by D. D. Calhoun
- Starring: Betty Bronson; William Collier Jr. Mitchell Lewis; Harry Todd; Charles Hill Mailes
- Cinematography: Frank Kesson
- Production company: Warner Bros. Pictures
- Distributed by: Warner Bros. Pictures
- Release date: March 16, 1929
- Running time: 58 minutes
- Country: United States
- Languages: Sound (Part-Talkie); English Intertitles
- Budget: $87,000
- Box office: $242,000

One Stolen Night is a 1929 American sound part-talkie adventure crime film directed by Scott R. Dunlap, and starring Betty Bronson, William Collier Jr., Mitchell Lewis, Harry Todd, and Charles Hill Mailes. In addition to sequences with audible dialogue or talking sequences, the film features a synchronized musical score and sound effects along with English intertitles. According to the film review in Variety, 50 percent of the total running time featured dialogue. The soundtrack was recorded using the Vitaphone sound-on-disc system. The film is based on the short story The Arab by D. D. Calhoun. It is a remake of the 1923 film with the same name. The film was released by Warner Bros. Pictures on March 16, 1929.

== Plot ==
Bob and his brother Stanton are soldiers in a regiment of cavalry stationed at an English fort in the Sudan. When Stanton steals the commissary funds, Bob—believing his parents already view him as the family's black sheep—deserts and takes the blame.

Bob finds work as a handyman with a cheap vaudeville troupe at the Algerian café of Abou ibn Adam. The troupe includes Monsieur Blossom, a licentious old reprobate; Madame Blossom; Chyra; Balzer the juggler and his dwarf assistant; and Jeanne, with whom Bob falls in love.

Madame Blossom, jealous of her husband's lustful attention toward Chyra, lashes out during their whip act on stage, striking Chyra's neck instead of a cigarette, and driving her into the street. Jeanne, formerly a singer in the act, is chosen as Chyra's replacement. Afraid she will suffer the same fate, Jeanne seeks comfort from Bob. Though penniless, the two agree to leave the show together the following night.

Jeanne survives her debut performance, which is attended by Sheik Abdullah Pasha el Achmid and his vizir Daoud. The Sheik, hoping to make Jeanne one of his wives, arranges through Madame Blossom to have her brought to his castle under false pretenses, offering gold in exchange. Jeanne, told she will only be dancing for the Sheik, agrees to go.

Meanwhile, Brandon, a former soldier who recognizes Bob as a deserter, threatens to report him unless paid off. Lacking funds, Bob becomes a target for Monsieur Blossom, who hopes to claim the reward himself. Blossom, already casting covetous eyes at Jeanne, views Bob as an obstacle.

At the Sheik's castle, Jeanne is pampered and prepared for induction into the harem. However, while being bathed, the servants discover her dusky skin is only stained and that she is in reality “a Christian dog.” Furious at the deception, the Sheik banishes her.

Bob, having learned of Jeanne's predicament, rushes across the desert to the Sheik's castle. Though refused admittance, he scales the walls and bursts into the Sheik's presence—only to discover that Jeanne has already been sent back to the show.

Meanwhile, Monsieur Blossom has informed the soldiers of the whereabouts of Bob. When Bob returns and embraces Jeanne, Madame Blossom catches them and hastens back to camp on a horse to inform her husband and the soldiers. But when the soldiers and Monsieur Blossom arrive to capture them, they find that Bob, Jeanne, Balzer, and the dwarf assistant have already escaped.

Madame Blossom, finally reconciled to her husband, cradles his head and exclaims tenderly, “My man!”

== Cast ==
- Betty Bronson as Jeanne
- William Collier Jr. as Bob
- Mitchell Lewis as Blossom
- Harry Todd as Blazer
- Charles Hill Mailes as Doad
- Nina Quartero as Chyra
- Rose Dione as Madame Blossom
- Otto Lederer as Abou-Ibu-Adam
- Angelo Rossitto as The Dwarf
- Jack Santoro as Brandon
- Harry Schultz as The Sheik

== Music ==
The film features a theme song entitled "My Cairo Love" with music by J.S. Zamecnik and lyrics by Harry D. Kerr.

== Reception ==
According to Warner Bros records, the film earned $227,000 domestically and $15,000 foreign.

== Preservation ==
The film survives in a 9.5mm copy at the BFI film archive.

== See also ==
- List of early sound feature films (1926–1929)
