= Gerry Blattner =

British film producer

- Born: Gerard L. Blattner; 1913; Liverpool, England
- Died: 1992 (approx.); Spain
- Occupation: Film producer
- Years active: 1933–1976
- Spouses: Pamela Daniels (m. 1943; divorced); Pearl

Gerry Blattner (real first name Gerard) was a British film producer who worked on many films produced by Warner Bros. in the United Kingdom.

== Career ==
Gerry Blattner was a British film producer and executive producer, best known for producing the Oscar- and BAFTA-nominated and Golden Globe winning feature film The Sundowners (1960).

Son of Ludwig Blattner (also a film producer, as well as an inventor), he followed his father into the film business. He was a production supervisor on My Lucky Star (1933), which was filmed at the Blattner Studios in Elstree. He was a production manager on The Edge of the World (1937) at the age of 24, a film produced by Joe Rock, who leased a studio amongst the Elstree Studios complex from Gerry's father in 1934 and appointed Gerry the studio manager. By the 1950s he was producing or overseeing the production of many of the Warner Bros. films made at Elstree and elsewhere in Europe such as Captain Horatio Hornblower R.N. (1951), Where's Charley? (1952) as producer, Land of the Pharaohs (1955) as production manager, and Fanny (1961). Although Raoul Walsh, with whom he worked on Captain Horatio Hornblower, described Gerry Blattner as the "studio head" in his autobiography (and mistakenly called him "Jerry"), he was actually the head of Warner Bros. European Film Productions.

In the contemporary Australian publicity handouts for The Sundowners, the section describing the choice of locations quotes (and describes) Gerry Blattner thus:

'The whole effect is a visual one,' explains Gerry Blattner, the tubby English producer with a satisfied finality in his voice. 'We want one half of the picture to have a background of deep green, hence Nimmitabel. The other half has to look burnt down - Port Augusta.'

In 1976 the television adaptation of I, Claudius was produced by arrangement with Gerry Blattner Productions.

== Personal life ==
Although born in Liverpool in 1913, the later years of his childhood were spent in Hertfordshire after his father bought the Ideal Film Company studio in Elstree in 1928. When his father committed suicide in 1935, Gerry was only 22 years old. He married in 1943 during the production of the film Theatre Royal, which starred Flanagan and Allen: Barbara K. Emary recalled that they gave a china tea set as a wedding present, but dropped it as a joke as it was being handed over. He had one daughter, Sandra, whose marriage to David Benson was attended by many film star friends of her father. Gerry and his first wife Pamela also lived in Elstree while he was working for Warner Bros. Simon Cowell's parents lived next door, and Gerry is credited with helping Simon to obtain his first job in showbusiness as a runner on the production of The Shining, which was shot at Elstree Studios by Warner Bros. Gerry died in the early 1990s.

Gerry and his father were honoured by the naming of Blattner Close in Elstree in the mid-1990s.
