= West of Hot Dog =

1924 film

- DVD cover
- Directed by: Scott Pembroke; Joe Rock
- Written by: Tay Garnett
- Produced by: Joe Rock
- Starring: Stan Laurel
- Cinematography: Edgar Lyons
- Production company: Joe Rock Comedies
- Distributed by: Film Booking Offices of America
- Release date: December 30, 1924
- Running time: 30 minutes
- Country: United States
- Language: Silent with English intertitles

The full film

West of Hot Dog is a 1924 American comedy film starring Stan Laurel.

== Plot ==
Stan's stagecoach is robbed on his way to Hot Dog for the reading of his uncle's will. Every time he raises his hands his pants fall down. The robbers ride off and Stan tries to drive "Little Mustard" home. The stagecoach horses run off and the stagecoach stands still.

The next day at the lawyer Jones's office, tenderfoot Stan learns that he inherits everything including a saloon. If he dies, the estate goes to the two outlaws who have thrown him out the second story window twice. Tenderfoot Stan goes to his saloon only to see a poker player shot and the place robbed.

Stan jumps on to Bad Mike's horse backward but manages to ride out of town. The horse takes Stan to Bad Mike's house. Mike and his henchmen arrive with the loot. They keep trying to shoot Stan but keep hitting one another. The Sheriff and the posse arrive by car. Stan captures Mike and the Sheriff arrests him.. Now the girl has interest in Stan but he walks off.

== Cast ==
- Stan Laurel as Stan, a tenderfoot
- Julie Leonard as Little Mustard - Sheriff's daughter (uncredited)
- Lew Meehan as Bad Mike (uncredited)

== See also ==
- List of American films of 1924
