= Navy Blue Days =

1925 film

- Directed by: Scott Pembroke; Joe Rock
- Written by: Tay Garnett
- Produced by: Joe Rock
- Starring: Stan Laurel
- Cinematography: Edgar Lyons
- Release date: May 30, 1925
- Running time: 20 minutes
- Country: United States
- Languages: Silent film English intertitles

Navy Blue Days is a 1925 American film starring Stan Laurel. The film is extant.

== Cast ==
- Stan Laurel as Stan
- Julie Leonard as Grenadine
- Glen Cavender as Pete Vermicelli

== See also ==
- List of American films of 1925
- Stan Laurel filmography
