= The Oregon Trail (1936 film) =

1936 film

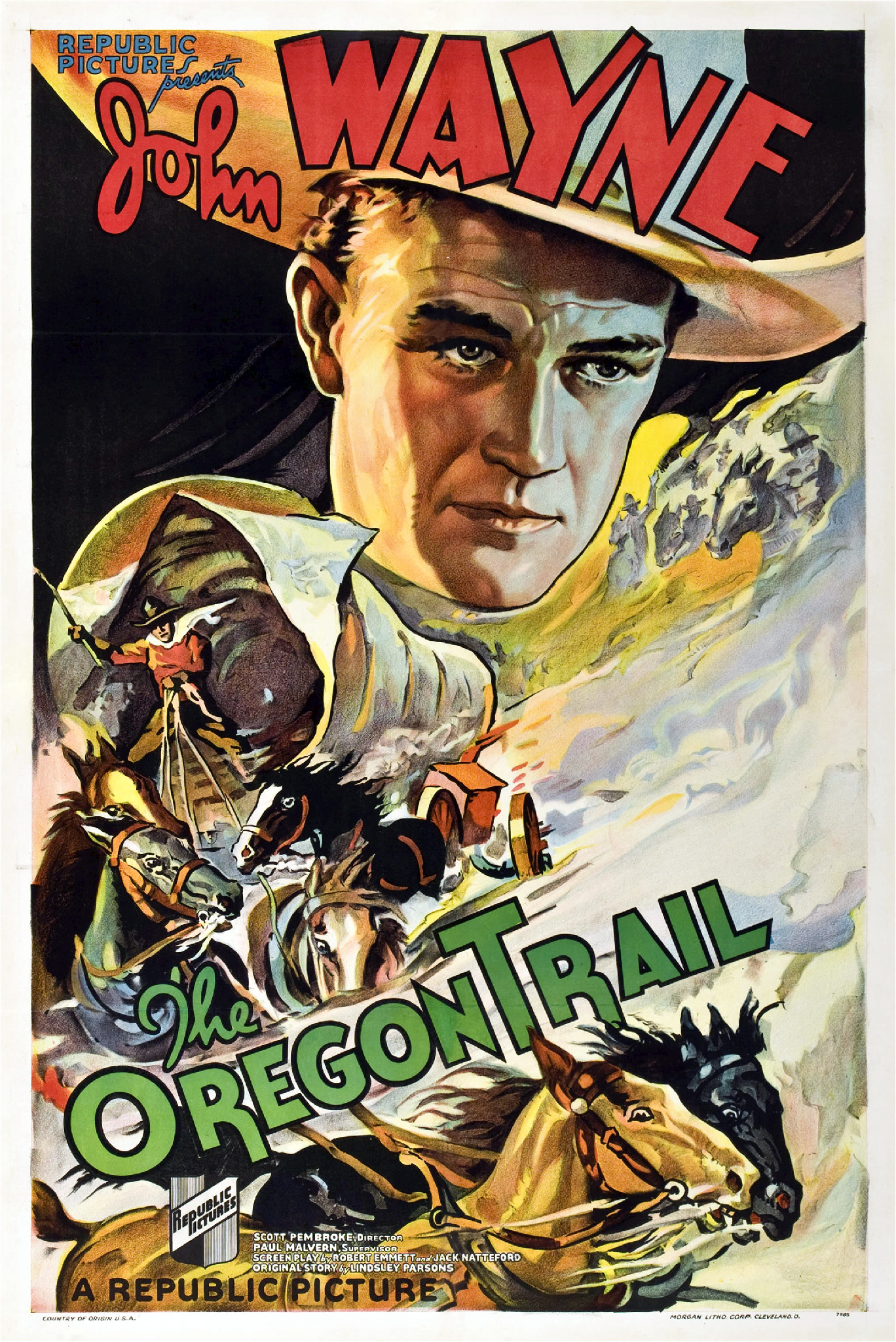
- Film poster
- Directed by: Scott Pembroke
- Written by: Jack Natteford; Lindsley Parsons; Robert Emmett Tansey
- Produced by: Trem Carr
- Starring: John Wayne
- Cinematography: Gus Peterson
- Edited by: Carl Pierson
- Music by: Harry Grey
- Production company: Republic Pictures
- Distributed by: Republic Pictures
- Release date: January 18, 1936
- Running time: 59 minutes
- Country: United States
- Language: English

The Oregon Trail is a 1936 American Western film directed by Scott Pembroke for Republic Pictures and starring John Wayne. It is a lost film with no known prints remaining. In 2013, film collector Kent Sperring discovered 40 photographs that were taken during the making of the film. The Oregon Trail started production on November 29, 1935, and was filmed at Alabama Hills.

== Plot ==
John Wayne plays retired army captain John Delmont, who discovers from his father's journal that he was left to die by a renegade, and vows to hunt down the killer.

== Cast ==
- John Wayne as Capt John Delmont
- Ann Rutherford as Anne Ridgeley
- Joseph W. Girard as Col. Delmont
- Yakima Canutt as Tom Richards
- Frank Rice as Red
- E. H. Calvert as Jim Ridgeley
- Ben Hendricks Jr. as Maj. Harris
- Harry Harvey as Tim
- Fern Emmett as Minnie
- Jack Rutherford as Benton
- Marian Ferrell as Sis
- Roland Ray as Markey
- Gino Corrado as Forrenza
- Edward LeSaint as Gen. Ferguson
- Octavio Giraud as Don Miguel

== See also ==
- List of lost films
