= Stan Laurel =

English actor and comedian (1890–1965)

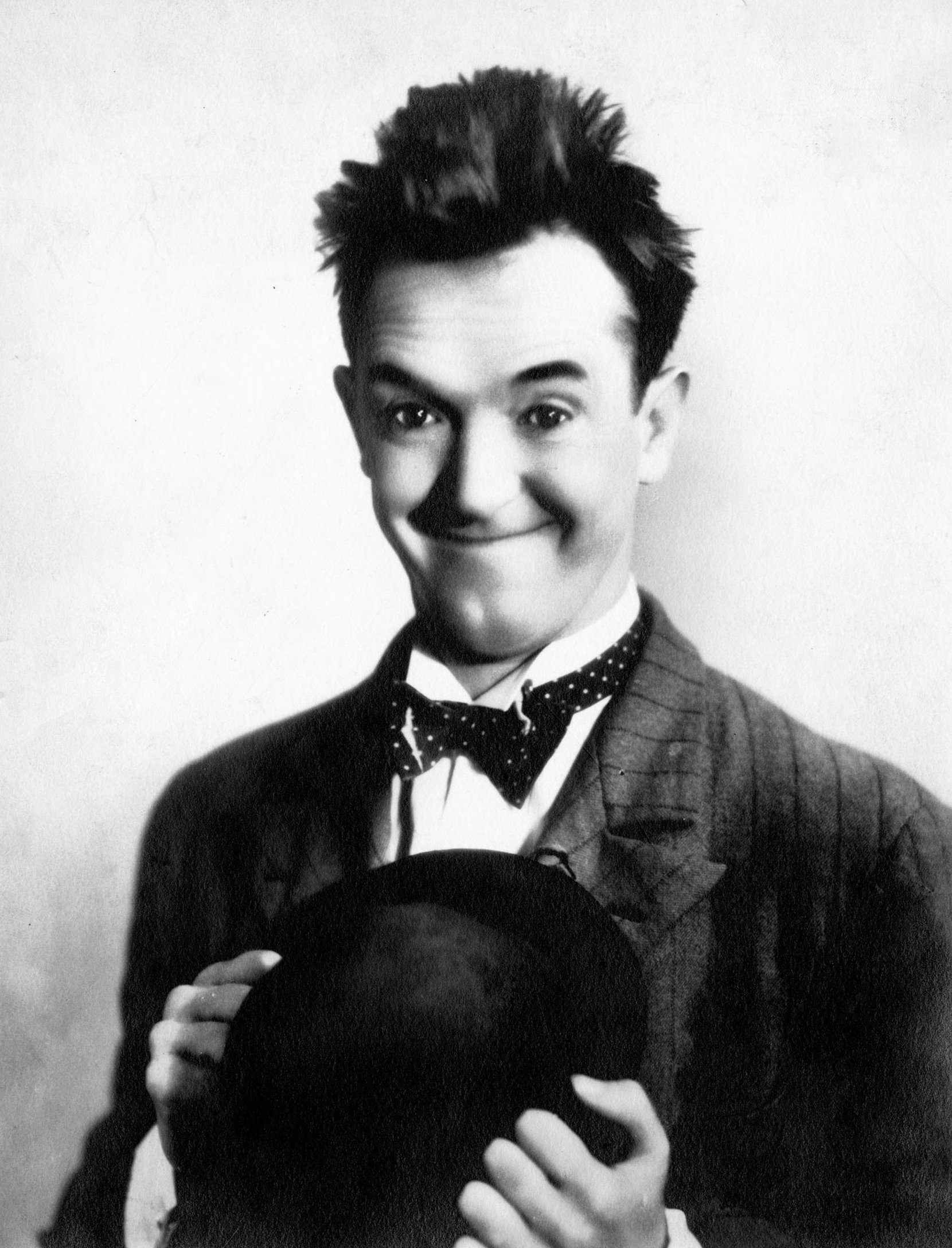
- Laurel c. 1929
- Born: Arthur Stanley Jefferson; 16 June 1890; Ulverston, Lancashire, England
- Died: 23 February 1965 (aged 74); Santa Monica, California, U.S.
- Resting place: Forest Lawn Memorial Park, Los Angeles, California, U.S.
- Occupations: Actor; comedian; writer; director
- Years active: 1906–1957
- Spouses: Lois Neilson (m. 1926; div. 1935) Virginia Ruth Rogers (m. 1935; div. 1937) (m. 1941; div. 1946) Vera Ivanova Shuvalova (m. 1938; div. 1940) Ida Kitaeva Raphael (m. 1946)
- Partner: Mae Dahlberg (1917–1925)
- Children: 2
- Website: laurel-and-hardy.com

Stan Laurel (/ˈlɒrəl/ LORR-əl; born Arthur Stanley Jefferson; 16 June 1890 – 23 February 1965) was an English actor, comedian, director and writer who was in the comedy duo Laurel and Hardy. He appeared with his comedy partner Oliver Hardy in 107 short films, feature films and cameo roles.

Laurel began his career in music hall, where he developed a number of his standard comic devices, including the bowler hat, and developed his skills in pantomime and music-hall sketches. He was a member of "Fred Karno's London Comedians", where he was Charlie Chaplin's understudy. He and Chaplin arrived in the United States on the same ship from the United Kingdom with the Karno troupe. Laurel began his film career in 1917 and made his final appearance in 1951. He appeared with his comic partner Oliver Hardy in the film short The Lucky Dog in 1921, although they did not become an official team until late 1927. He then appeared exclusively with Hardy until retiring after his comedy partner's death in 1957.

In April 1961, at the 33rd Academy Awards, Laurel was given an Academy Honorary Award for his pioneering work in comedy, and he has a star on the Hollywood Walk of Fame at 7021 Hollywood Boulevard. Laurel and Hardy were ranked top among best double acts and seventh overall in a 2005 UK poll to find the Comedians' Comedian. In 2019, Laurel topped a list of the greatest British comedians compiled by a panel on the television channel Gold. In 2009, a bronze statue of the duo was unveiled in Laurel's hometown of Ulverston.

== Early life ==
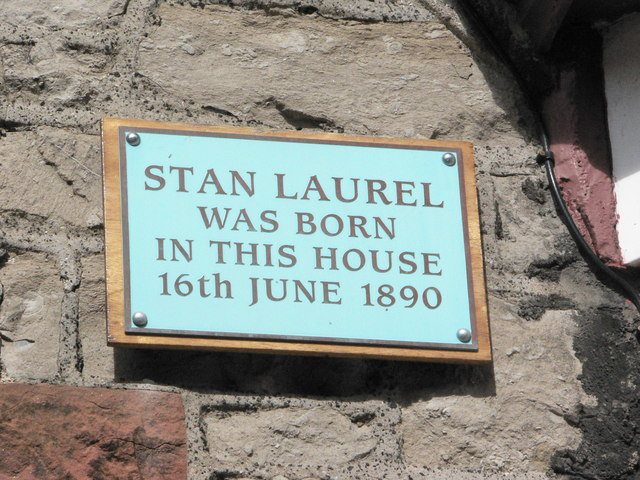
Plaque at Laurel's birthplace in Ulverston

Arthur Stanley Jefferson was born on 16 June 1890 in his grandparents' house in Ulverston, Lancashire, (Note: Although the town was in Lancashire when Laurel was born, that area today is in Cumbria.) to Arthur Joseph Jefferson, an actor and theatre manager from Bishop Auckland, and Margaret (née Metcalfe), an actress from Ulverston. He was one of five children. One of them was Edward, an actor who appeared in four of Stan's short films.

His parents were very active in the theatre, frequently travelling around the country. Consequently, Laurel, who was too young to travel, lived in Ulverston with his grandparents, George and Sarah Metcalfe, for the first seven years of his life. He became very familiar with Ulverston. He attended services with his religious grandparents at Holy Trinity Church, which is close to Argyle Street and is where his parents were married. He was fond of Beer's treacle toffee from Gillam's general store on Market Street. Laurel remembered the treat in later life, writing to family in England in January 1950:

I used to go shopping on Market Street with Grandma Metcalfe - that was a big treat for me. Beers Treacle toffee, it sure was good!

Laurel, who had a lifelong love of fishing, used to take a rod to Ulverston's canal, learning from his uncle John Shaw. His favourite place was beyond the old North Lonsdale Iron and Steel Company Ltd, close to his home in Argyle Street. Just behind him was the viaduct carrying the railway from Carnforth. Laurel in later years would recall swinging on a pair of lock gates on the canal as he waited for a bite on his line. During these fishing expeditions, Laurel would have passed Ulverston's cemetery, where he was impressed by a miniature lighthouse memorial built in memory of Dr Thomas Watkins Wilson. The lighthouse memorial, which is still there today, had a light at the top that was once lit 24 hours a day. The lighthouse memorial was designated as a Grade II listed building in 1996. In 1932, Laurel was being interviewed by a Daily Herald reporter and as they looked up at his name in lights above a theatre in London's Leicester Square, he said:

Looks great but kind of wasteful, but you should see the lighthouse in the graveyard at Ulverston in Lancashire where I was born. They put it up when I was a kid, a tombstone with a light on top. It was the Eighth Wonder of the World to me. Ever since then it's been my ambition to have a tombstone like that.

Laurel went on frequent excursions from Ulverston railway station into the Lake District with his cousins, grandparents and sometimes his parents. They visited his aunt and uncle John and Nant Shaw when they ran grocery shops, first at Flookburgh, and later Sawrey. Another favourite place to visit was the lake at Windermere.

Laurel had his first taste of the theatre in Ulverston. The Hippodrome theatre, known as Spencer's Gaff, was just across the road from his home, in Lightburn Park. The theatre was like a giant tent, made from wood with a canvas roof. Laurel's parents both trod the boards here and his father A. J. developed some of the plays he would later become known for here. The Hippodrome burnt down in 1910, the year Laurel sailed for America with the Fred Karno troupe. Laurel visited Ulverston with his comedy partner Oliver Hardy on Tuesday 27 May 1947 at the invitation of the town's urban council. The comedians were given a civic reception at the Coronation Hall and Laurel was presented with a copy of his birth certificate on the hall's balcony, watched on by hundreds of fans. Laurel and Hardy then visited 3 Argyle Street for a tour of Laurel's former home, posing for the North West Evening Mail's photographer as they emerged from the house, crowded by fans and well-wishers. The comedy duo were appearing at Morecambe's Winter Gardens at the time.

Later, Laurel spent much time living with his maternal grandmother, Sarah Metcalfe in North Shields. He attended school at King James I Grammar School in Bishop Auckland, County Durham, and the King's School in Tynemouth, Northumberland.

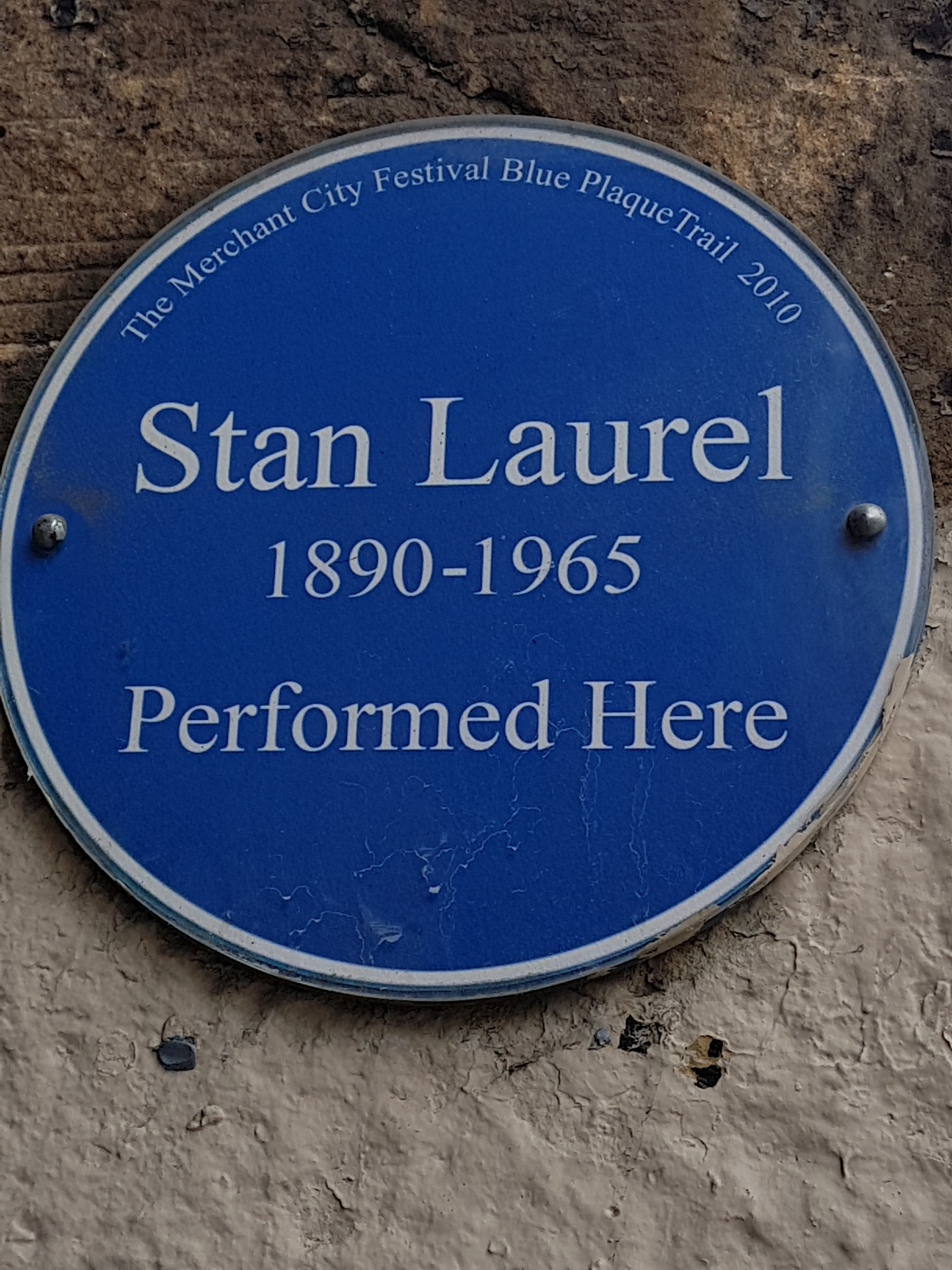
Stan Laurel plaque, Britannia Music Hall, Glasgow

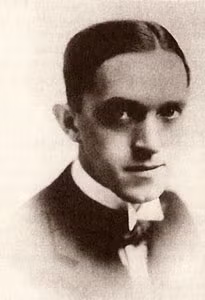
Laurel, 1910

He moved with his parents to Glasgow, where he completed his education at Queen's Park Secondary School and Rutherglen Academy, now known as Stonelaw High School. Later his father managed Glasgow's Metropole Theatre, where Laurel first worked. His boyhood hero was Dan Leno, considered one of the greatest English music hall comedians. With a natural affinity for the theatre, Laurel gave his first professional performance on stage at the Panopticon in Glasgow at the age of sixteen, where he polished his skills at pantomime and music hall sketches. It was the music hall from where he drew his standard comic devices, including his bowler hat and nonsensical understatement.

Laurel joined music hall impresario Fred Karno's troupe of actors in 1910 with the stage name of "Stan Jefferson"; the troupe, advertised as "Fred Karno's London Comedians", also included a young Charlie Chaplin. Under the tutelage of Karno, the music hall nurtured him, and in England he acted as Chaplin's understudy for some time. Karno was a pioneer of slapstick, and in his biography Laurel stated, "Fred Karno didn't teach Charlie [Chaplin] and me all we know about comedy. He just taught us most of it". Chaplin and Laurel arrived in the United States on the same ship from Britain with the Karno troupe and toured the country. During the First World War, Laurel registered for military service in America on 5 June 1917, as required under the Selective Service Act. He was not called up; his registration card states his status as resident alien and his deafness as exemptions.

Six years before becoming a team, Laurel and Hardy appeared for the first time together in this short, The Lucky Dog (1921), as seen at runtime 05:01. Stan's brother, Edward Jefferson, also appeared in the film as the butler.

In 1912 Laurel worked together with Ted Desmond on tour in Netherlands and Belgium as a comedy double act known as the Barto Bros. Their act, which involved them dressing as Romans, finished when Laurel was offered a spot in an American touring troupe.

The Karno troupe broke up in the spring of 1914. Stan joined with two other former Karno performers, Edgar Hurley and his wife Ethel (known as "Wren") to form "The Three Comiques". On the advice of booking agent Gordon Bostock, they called themselves "the Keystone Trio". Stan started to do his character as an imitation of Charlie Chaplin, and the Hurleys began to do their parts as silent comedians Chester Conklin and Mabel Normand. They played successfully from February through October 1915, until the Hurleys and Stan parted ways. Between 1916 and 1918, he teamed up with Alice Cooke and Baldwin Cooke, who became his lifelong friends, to form the Stan Jefferson Trio.

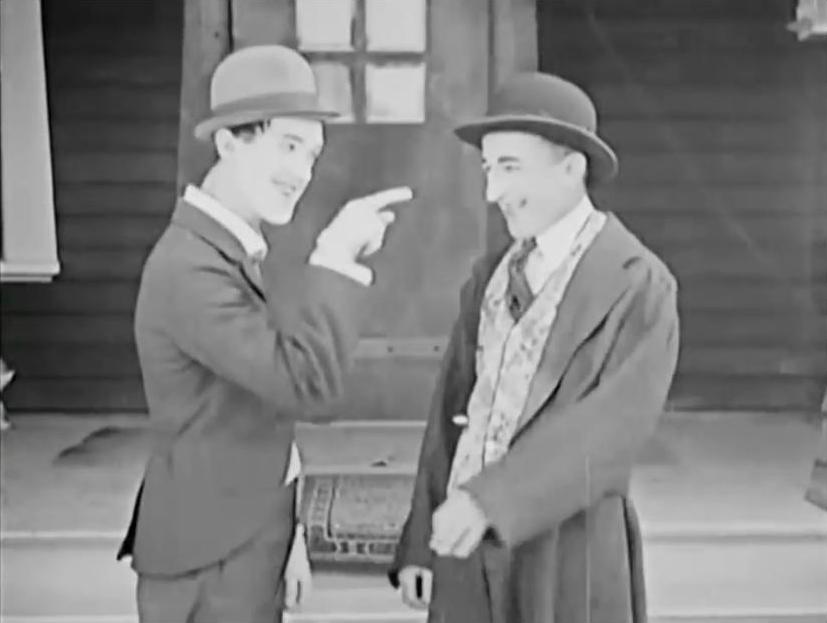
One year after launching his film career, Laurel (left) became the co-star of Frauds and Frenzies with Larry Semon (1918).

Amongst other performers, Laurel worked briefly alongside Oliver Hardy in the silent film short The Lucky Dog (1921), before the two were a team. It was around this time that Laurel met actress Mae Dahlberg. Around the same time, he adopted the stage name of Laurel at Dahlberg's suggestion that his stage name Stan Jefferson was unlucky, due to it having thirteen letters. (Note: Laurel disputed this and claimed that it just "sounded good".) The pair were performing together when Laurel was offered $75 a week to star in two-reel comedies. After making his first film Nuts in May, Universal offered him a contract. The contract was soon cancelled during a reorganisation at the studio. Among the films in which Dahlberg and Laurel appeared together was the 1922 parody Mud and Sand.

By 1924, Laurel had given up the stage for full-time film work, under contract with Joe Rock for 12 two-reel comedies. The contract had an unusual stipulation: Dahlberg was not to appear in the films. Rock thought her temperament was hindering Laurel's career. In 1925, she interfered with Laurel's work, and Rock offered her a cash settlement with a one-way ticket to her native Australia, which she accepted. The 12 two-reel comedies were Mandarin Mix-Up (1924), Detained (1924), Monsieur Don't Care (1924), West of Hot Dog (1924), Somewhere in Wrong (1925), Twins (1925), Pie-Eyed (1925), The Snow Hawk (1925), Navy Blue Days (1925), The Sleuth (1925), Dr. Pyckle and Mr. Pryde (1925) and Half a Man (1925). Laurel was credited for directing or co-directing ten silent shorts (between 1925 and 1927), but appeared in none of these. Laurel's future partner Hardy, however, did appear in three of the shorts directed by Laurel: Yes, Yes, Nanette! (1925), Wandering Papas (1926) and Madame Mystery (1926).

== Laurel and Hardy ==
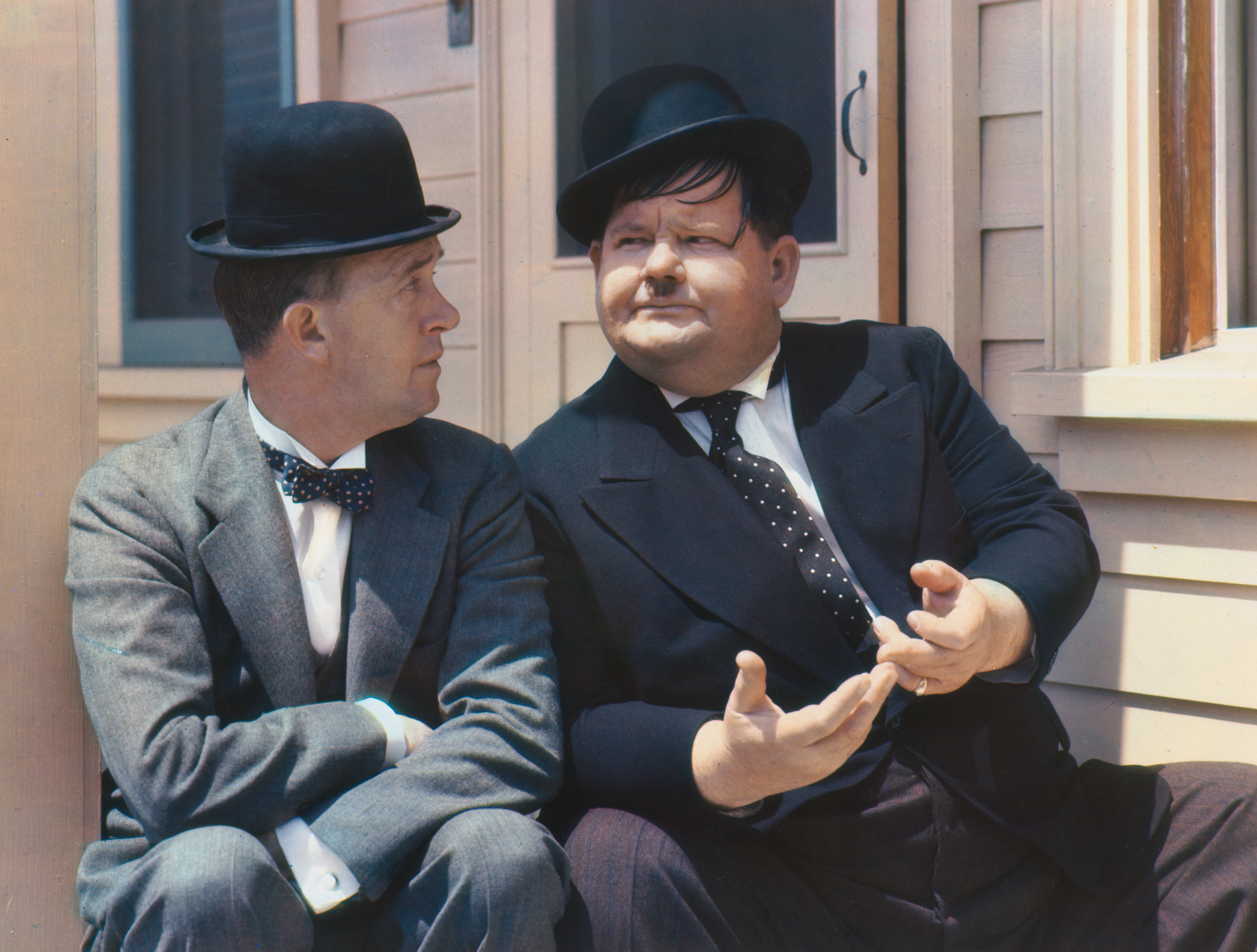
Laurel (left) and Hardy in 1938

Laurel next signed with the Hal Roach studio, where he began directing films, including a 1925 production called Yes, Yes, Nanette (in which Oliver Hardy had a part under the name "Babe" Hardy). It had been his intention to work primarily as a writer and director.

The same year, Hardy, a member of the Hal Roach Studios Comedy All Star players, was injured in a kitchen mishap and hospitalised. Because he was unable to work on the scheduled film, Get 'Em Young, Laurel was asked to return to acting to fill in. Starting early in 1927, Laurel and Hardy began sharing the screen in several short films, including Duck Soup, Slipping Wives and With Love and Hisses. The two became friends and their comic chemistry soon became obvious. Roach Studios' supervising director Leo McCarey noticed the audience reaction to them and began teaming them, leading to the creation of the Laurel and Hardy series later that year.

Together, the two men began producing a huge body of short films, including The Battle of the Century, Should Married Men Go Home?, Two Tars, Be Big!, Big Business and many others. Laurel and Hardy successfully made the transition to talking films with the short Unaccustomed As We Are in 1929. They also appeared in their first feature in one of the revue sequences of The Hollywood Revue of 1929, and the following year they appeared as the comic relief in the lavish all-colour (in Technicolor) musical feature The Rogue Song. Their first starring feature Pardon Us was released in 1931. They continued to make both features and shorts until 1935, including their 1932 three-reeler The Music Box, which won an Academy Award for Best Short Subject.

=== Trouble at Roach Studio ===
During the 1930s, Laurel was involved in a dispute with Hal Roach which resulted in the termination of his contract. Roach maintained separate contracts for Laurel and Hardy that expired at different times, so Hardy remained at the studio and was "teamed" with Harry Langdon for the 1939 film Zenobia. The studio discussed a series of films co-starring Hardy with Patsy Kelly to be called "The Hardy Family", but Laurel sued Roach over the contract dispute. Eventually, the case was dropped and Laurel returned to Roach. The first film that Laurel and Hardy made after Laurel returned was A Chump at Oxford. Subsequently, they made Saps at Sea, which was their last film for Roach.

=== Second World War ===
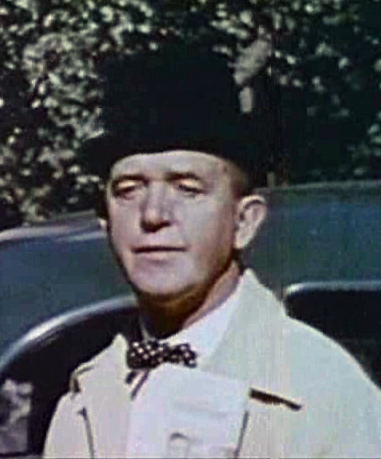
Stan Laurel in a still from The Tree in a Test Tube (1943), a colour short made for the US Department of Agriculture

In 1941, Laurel and Hardy signed a contract at 20th Century-Fox to make ten films over five years. Laurel found, to his shock, that he and Hardy were hired only as actors, and were not expected to contribute to the staging, writing, or editing of the productions. When the films proved very successful, Laurel and Hardy were granted more freedom and gradually added more of their own material. They had made six Fox features when the studio suddenly abandoned B-picture production in December 1944. The team signed another contract with Metro-Goldwyn-Mayer in 1942, resulting in two more features.

Revisiting his music hall days, Laurel returned to England in 1947 when he and Hardy went on a six-week tour of the United Kingdom performing in variety shows. They were mobbed wherever they went; Laurel's homecoming to Ulverston took place in May, and the duo were greeted by thousands of fans outside the Coronation Hall. The Evening Mail noted: "Oliver Hardy remarked to our reporter that Stan had talked about Ulverston for the past 22 years and he thought he had to see it." The tour included a Royal Variety Performance in front of King George VI and his consort Queen Elizabeth in London. The success of the tour led them to spend the next seven years touring the UK and Europe.

Around this time, Laurel found out that he had diabetes, so he encouraged Hardy to find solo projects, which he did, taking parts in John Wayne and Bing Crosby films.

In 1950, Laurel and Hardy were invited to France to make a feature film. The film was a disaster, a Franco-Italian co-production titled Atoll K. (The film was titled Utopia in the US and Robinson Crusoeland in the UK.) Both stars were noticeably ill during the filming. Upon returning to the United States, they spent most of their time recovering. In 1952, Laurel and Hardy toured Europe successfully, and they returned in 1953 for another tour of the continent. During this tour, Laurel fell ill and was unable to perform for several weeks.

In May 1954, Hardy had a heart attack and cancelled the tour. In 1955, they were planning to do a television series called Laurel and Hardy's Fabulous Fables based on children's stories. The plans were delayed after Laurel had a stroke on 25 April 1955, from which he recovered. But as the team was planning to get back to work, Hardy had a major stroke on 14 September 1956 and was unable to return to acting.

=== Hardy's death ===
When Oliver Hardy died on 7 August 1957, Laurel was devastated and never fully recovered from the loss. He was in fact too ill to attend Hardy's funeral (his wife and daughter attended on his behalf) and said, "Babe would understand". Although he continued to socialise with his fans, he refused to perform on stage or act in another film from then on, as he had no interest in working without Hardy, turning down every offer he was given for a public appearance.

== After Laurel and Hardy ==
In 1961, Stan Laurel was given an Academy Honorary Award "for his creative pioneering in the field of cinema comedy". Laurel was introduced by Bob Hope, and the award was accepted by Danny Kaye. Laurel had achieved his lifelong dream as a comedian and had been involved in nearly 190 films. He lived his final years in a small flat in the Oceana Apartments in Santa Monica, California. Laurel was gracious to fans and spent much time answering fan mail. His phone number was listed in the telephone directory and he would take calls from fans.

Jerry Lewis was among the comedians to visit Laurel, and Lewis received suggestions from him for the production of The Bellboy (1960). Lewis paid tribute to Laurel by naming his main character Stanley in the film, and having Bill Richmond play a version of Laurel as well. Dick Van Dyke told a similar story. When he was just starting his career, he looked up Laurel's phone number, called him, and then visited him at his home. Van Dyke played Laurel on "The Sam Pomerantz Scandals" episode of The Dick Van Dyke Show.

Director Stanley Kramer offered Laurel a cameo role in It's a Mad, Mad, Mad, Mad World (1963) alongside Buster Keaton and the Three Stooges, but Laurel declined. He reportedly said he did not want to be seen on screen in his old age, especially without Hardy. It appears, however, his involvement reached the stage of filming a background matching shot of his old time convertible, with a body double seated at the wheel, donning a bowler hat. The cameo appearance was then given to Jack Benny, who wore Laurel's signature bowler in the scene.

== Personal life ==
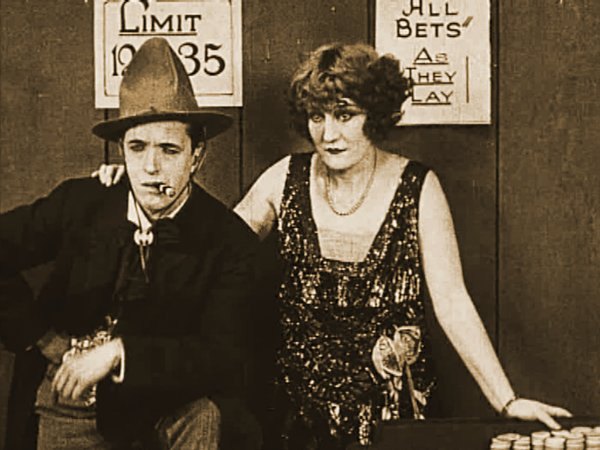
Laurel with Mae Dahlberg in Wide Open Spaces (1924)

Laurel and Mae Dahlberg never married, but lived together as common-law husband and wife from 1917 to 1925, before Dahlberg accepted a one-way ticket from Joe Rock to go back to her native Australia. In November 1937, Dahlberg was back in the US and sued Laurel for financial support. At the time, Laurel's second marriage was in the process of a divorce, with Dahlberg's legal suit adding to Laurel's woes. The matter was settled out of court. Dahlberg was described as a "relief project worker" by the court. Laurel was one of several popular British actors in Hollywood who never became a naturalised US citizen.

Laurel had four wives and married one of them a second time after their divorce. His first wife was Lois Neilson, whom he married on 13 August 1926. Together they had a daughter, Lois, who was born on 10 December 1927. Their second child, Stanley, was born two months premature in May 1930; he died nine days later. Laurel and Neilson divorced in December 1934. Their daughter Lois died on 27 July 2017 aged 89.

In 1935, Laurel married Virginia Ruth Rogers (known as Ruth). In 1937, he filed for divorce, confessing that he was not over his former wife Lois, but Lois decided against a reconciliation.

On New Year's Day 1938, Laurel married Vera Ivanova Shuvalova (known as Illeana); Ruth accused him of bigamy, but their divorce had been finalised a couple of days before his new marriage. He and Illeana separated in 1939 and divorced in 1940, with Illeana surrendering all claim to the Laurel surname on 1 February 1940 in exchange for $6,500.

In 1941, Laurel remarried Virginia Ruth Rogers; they were divorced for the second time in early 1946. On 6 May 1946, he married Ida Kitaeva Raphael to whom he remained married until his death.

== Death ==
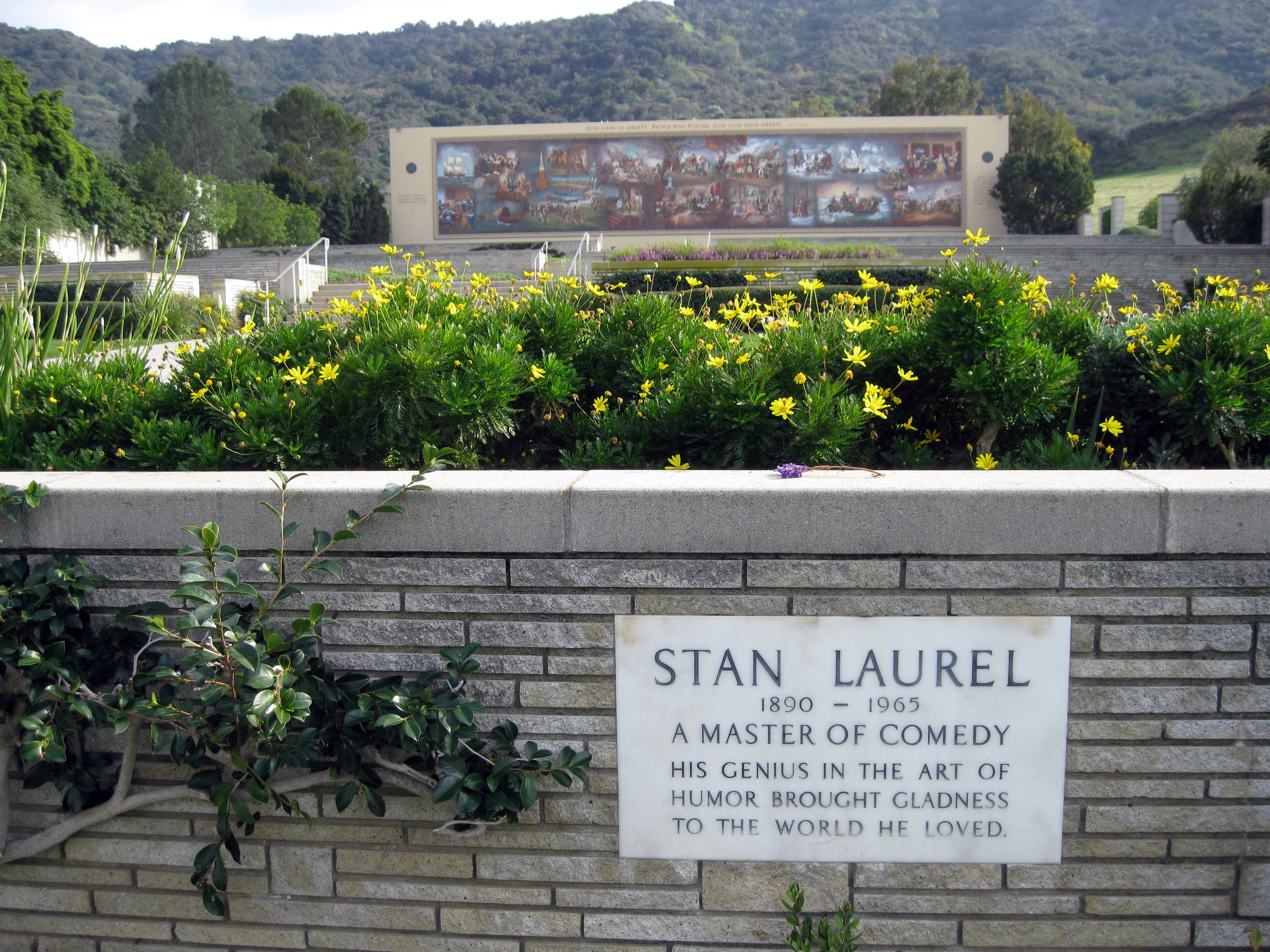
Stan Laurel's grave

Laurel died on 23 February 1965, aged 74, in his flat, four days following a heart attack. He told his nurse that he would not mind going skiing, and she replied that she was not aware that he was a skier. "I'm not," said Laurel, "I'd rather be doing that than getting all these needles stuck in me!" A few minutes later he died quietly in his armchair. Laurel's death certificate gave the cause as a massive myocardial infarcation, complicated by Diabetes mellitus and palatal cancer.

At his funeral service at Church of the Hills, Buster Keaton said, "Chaplin wasn't the funniest. I wasn't the funniest; this man was the funniest." Dick Van Dyke gave the eulogy as a friend, protégé and occasional impressionist of Laurel during his later years; he read The Clown's Prayer. Laurel had quipped, "If anyone at my funeral has a long face, I'll never speak to him again." He is interred at Forest Lawn–Hollywood Hills Cemetery.

== Legacy and honours ==
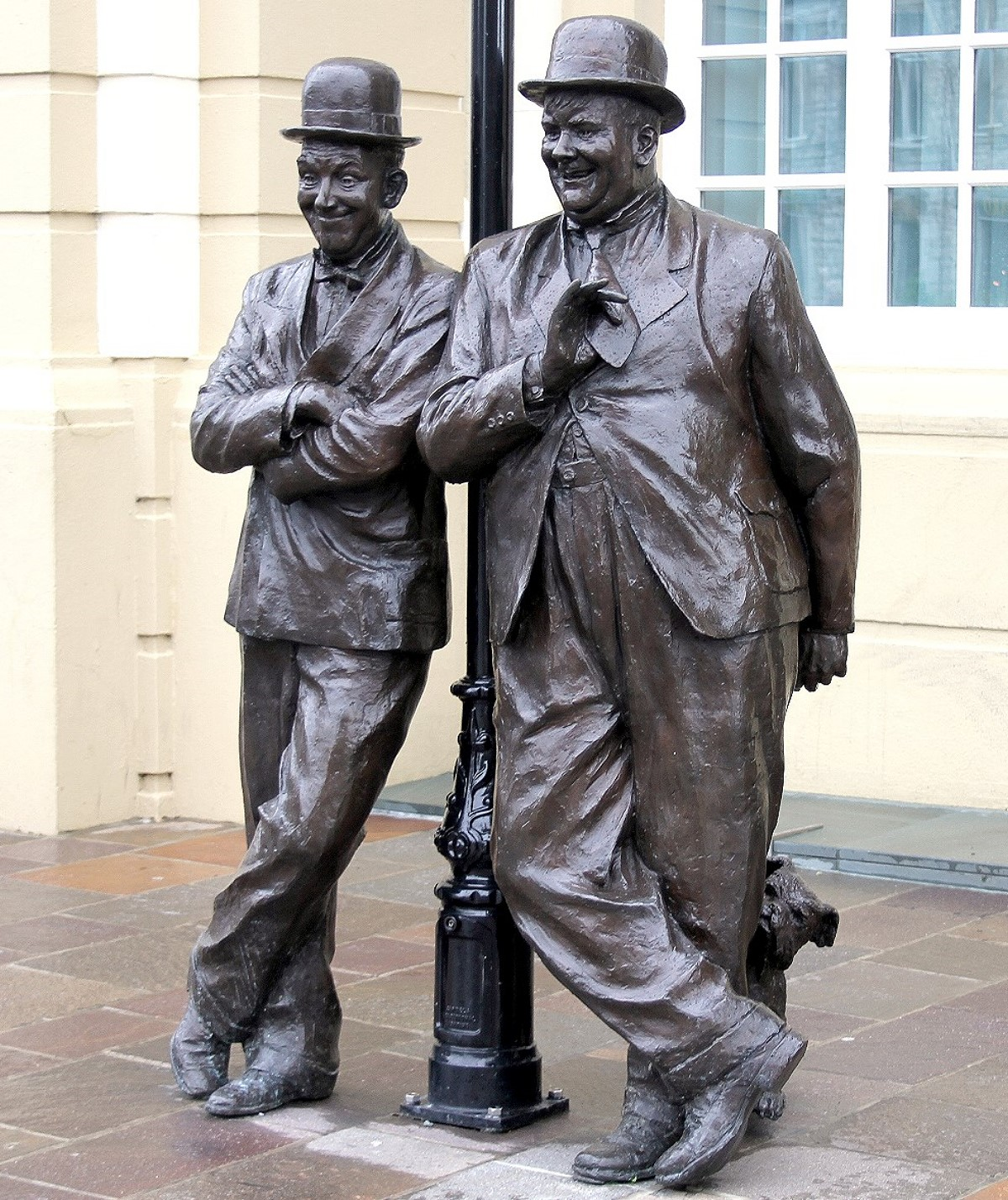
Statue of Stan Laurel and Oliver Hardy outside the Coronation Hall, Ulverston, Cumbria, England

Laurel and Hardy are featured on the cover of the Beatles' 1967 album Sgt. Pepper's Lonely Hearts Club Band. In 1989, a statue of Laurel was erected in Dockwray Square, North Shields, Tyne and Wear, England, where he lived at No. 8 from 1897 to 1902. The steps down from the Square to the North Shields Fish Quay were said to have inspired the piano-moving scene in The Music Box. In a 2005 UK poll, Comedians' Comedian, Laurel and Hardy were ranked top double act and seventh overall. Along with Hardy, Laurel was inducted into the Grand Order of Water Rats.

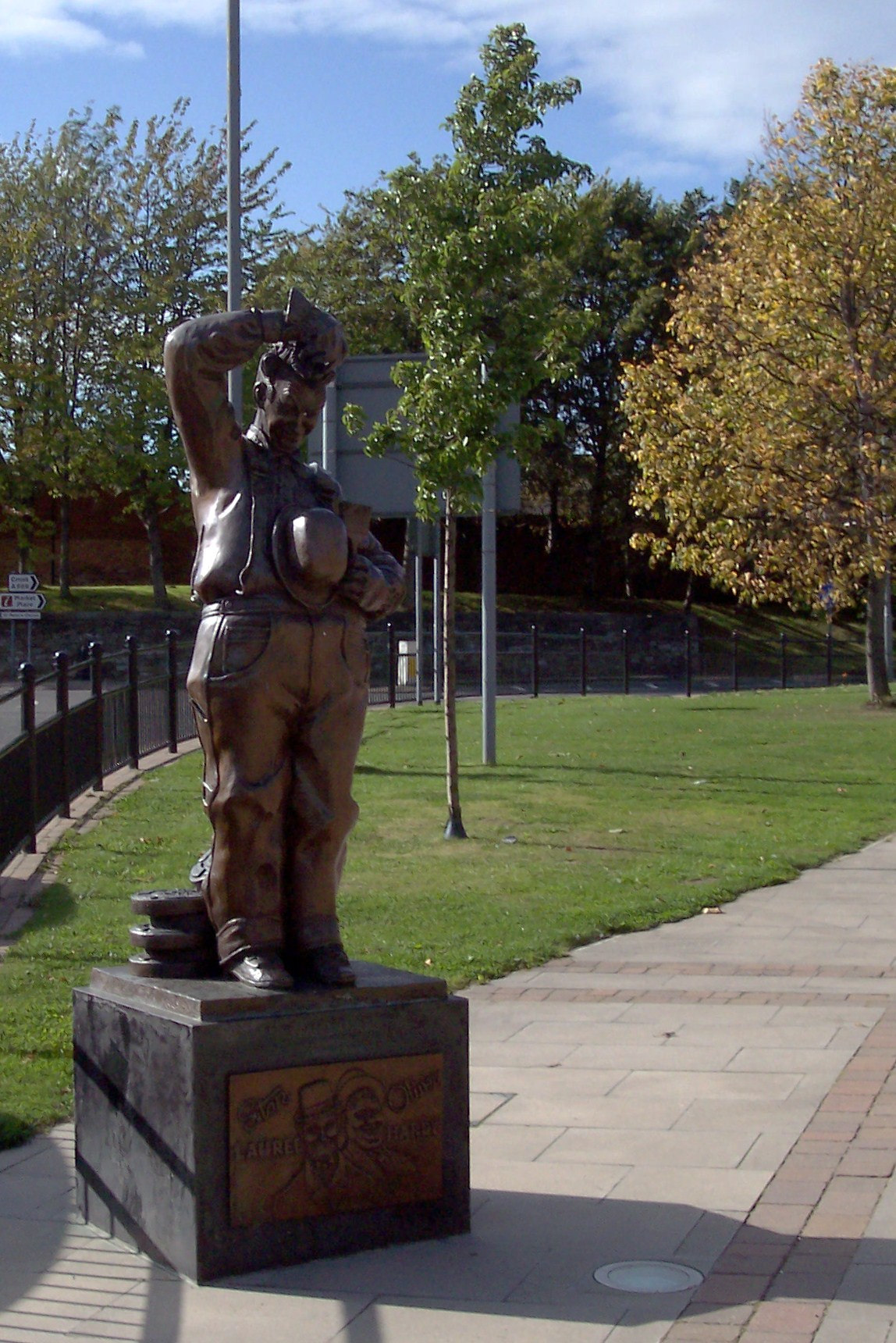
Statue of Laurel on the site once occupied by the theatre owned by his parents, in Bishop Auckland, County Durham, north east England

Neil Brand wrote a radio play titled Stan, broadcast in 2004 on BBC Radio 4 and subsequently on BBC Radio 4 Extra, starring Tom Courtenay as Stan Laurel, in which Stan visits Oliver Hardy after Hardy has had his stroke and tries to say the things to his dying friend and partner that have been left unsaid. In 2006, BBC Four showed a drama called Stan, based on Brand's radio play, in which Laurel meets Hardy on his deathbed and reminisces about their career.

A plaque on the Bull Inn, Bottesford, Leicestershire, England, marks Laurel and Hardy appearing in Nottingham over Easter 1952 and Christmas 1953, where they performed a number of shows daily. They stayed with Laurel's sister, Olga, who was the landlady of the pub, and pulled pints from behind the bar. In 2008, a statue of Stan Laurel was unveiled in Bishop Auckland, County Durham, on the site of the Eden Theatre. In April 2009, a bronze statue of Laurel and Hardy was unveiled in Ulverston.

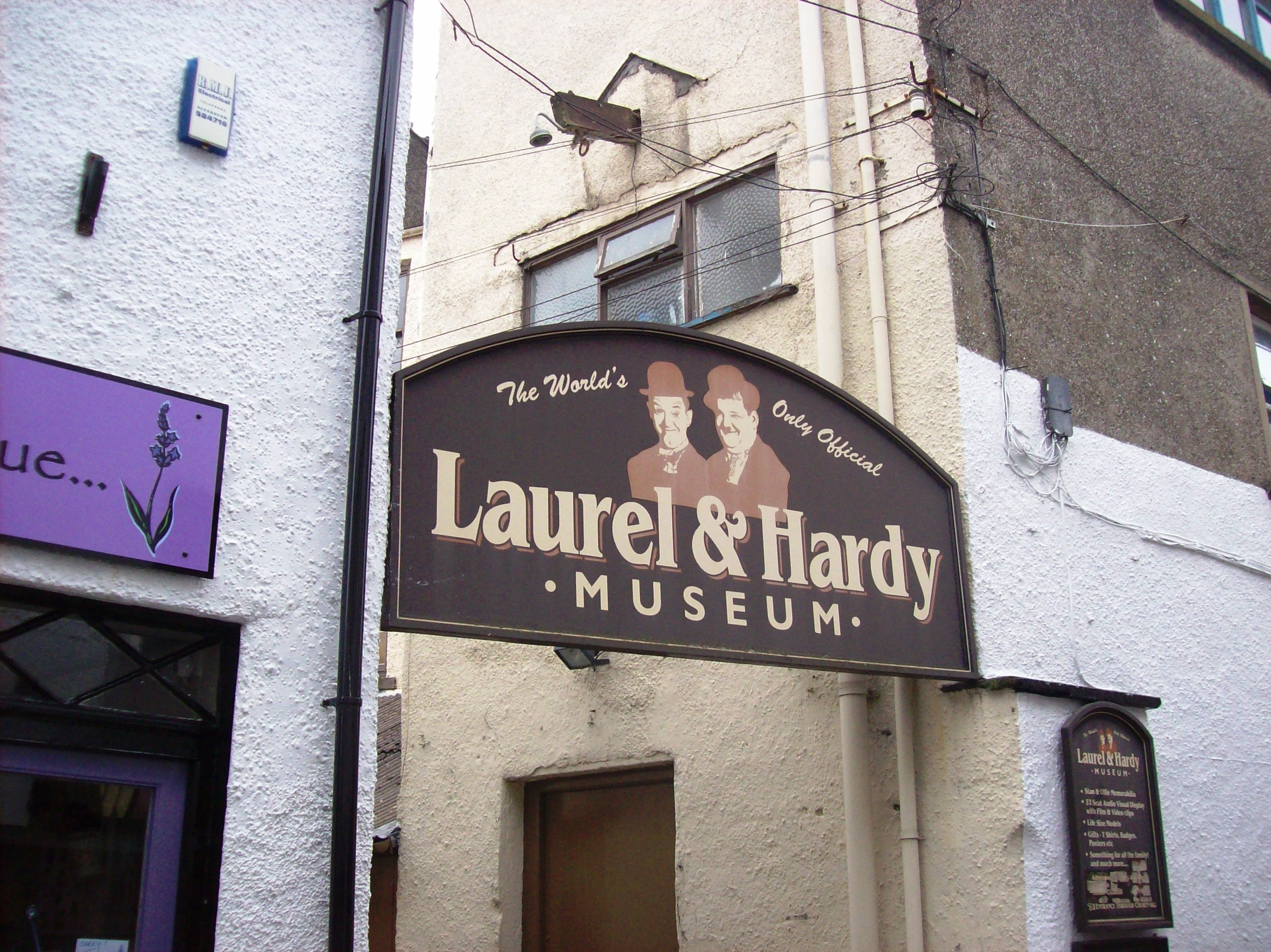
Laurel & Hardy Museum in Ulverston

There is a Laurel and Hardy Museum in Stan's hometown of Ulverston. There are two Laurel and Hardy museums in Hardy's hometown of Harlem, Georgia. One is operated by the town of Harlem, and the other is a private museum owned and operated by Gary Russeth, a Harlem resident.

In 2013, Gail Louw and Jeffrey Holland debuted a short one-man play "...And this is my friend Mr Laurel" at the Camden Fringe festival. The play, starring Holland as Laurel, was taken on tour of the UK in 2014 until June 2015.

John Connolly wrote a dramatized novel of Laurel's life titled he: A Novel and was released on August 24, 2017.

In the 2018 film Stan & Ollie, Steve Coogan portrayed Laurel (a performance which saw him nominated for the BAFTA for Best Actor in a Leading Role) and John C. Reilly played Hardy. Developed by BBC Films, the film is set in the twilight of their careers, and focuses on their farewell tour of Britain and Ireland's variety halls in 1953.

In 2019, Laurel was voted the greatest ever British comedian by a panel on the British television channel Gold.

== Filmography ==
- Stan Laurel filmography (films of Stan Laurel as an actor without Oliver Hardy)
- Laurel and Hardy filmography (filmography of Laurel and Hardy together)

== See also ==
- List of British Academy Award nominees and winners — Special Awards
