= Detained (1924 film) =

1924 film

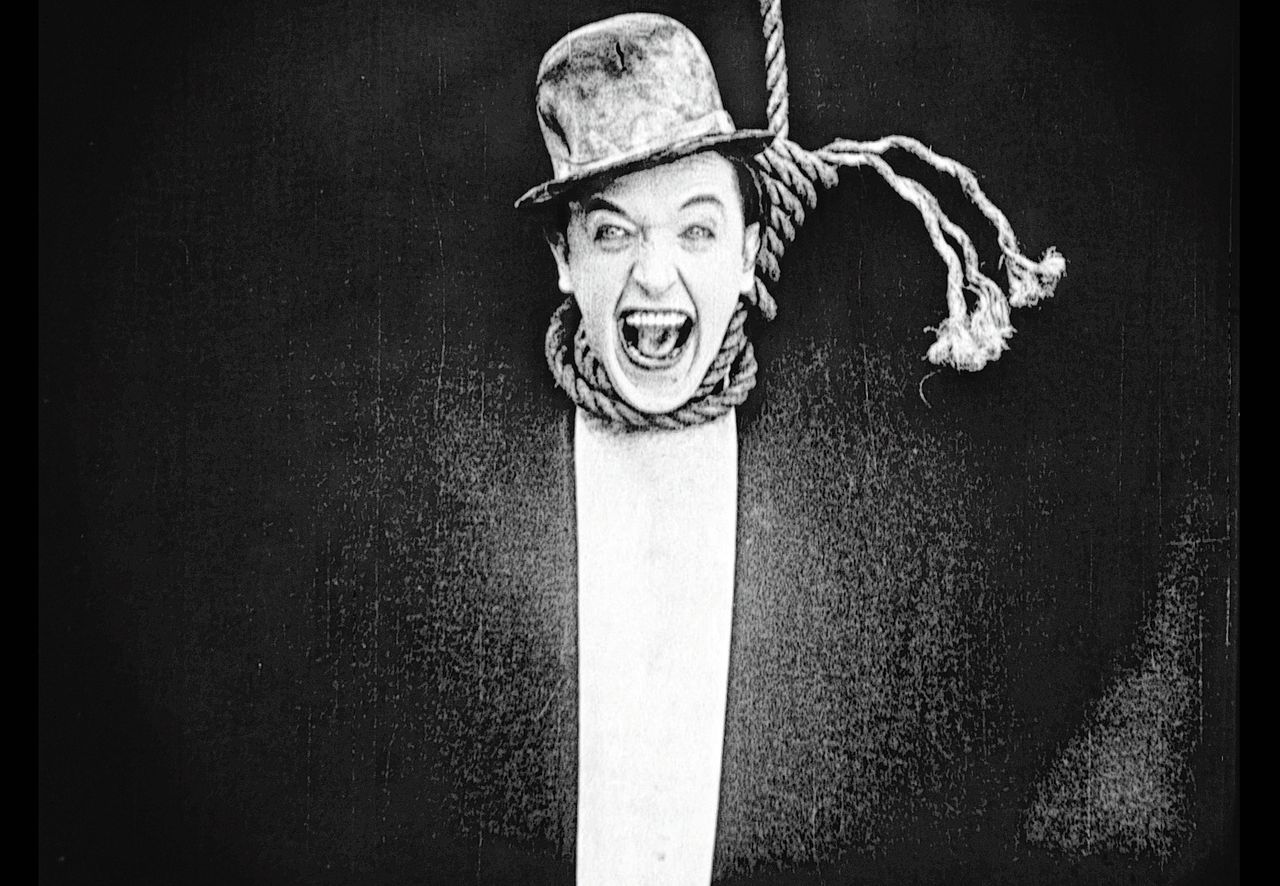
- "The Hanging Scene"
- Directed by: Scott Pembroke; Joe Rock
- Written by: Tay Garnett
- Produced by: Joe Rock
- Starring: Stan Laurel
- Distributed by: Film Booking Offices of America (FBO)
- Release date: October 1, 1924
- Running time: 20 minutes
- Country: United States
- Languages: Silent film English intertitles

Detained is a 1924 American silent comedy film starring Stan Laurel. In 2018, the Frisian Film Archive (Fries Film Archief) in Leeuwarden, Netherlands, was able to recover and restore a specific scene deemed lost. In "The Hanging Scene", Stan Laurel gets an extreme extended neck when he accidentally falls head first into the gallows, while trying to escape the prison. In 2017, a Dutch employee (Jurjen Enzing, 1987) found the footage in their archive and after restoration the entire movie including the scene was uploaded to YouTube. The scene was to be shown at the Bristol Slapstick Festival in January 2018.

== Plot ==
Detained (1924)

Stan is watering big trees with a watering can. An escaped convict beckons him over and swaps clothes before running off. An armed warden grabs him and takes him to the prison. A group of female visitors arrive but the basket is too wide to fit through the bars. Stan eventually gets the cake from the basket. A fly in the cream disturbs him. He asks the warden to borrow his gun which he gets, but killing the fly destroys the cake.

At wash time the prisoners are released and Stan tries to sneak off. In the washroom he shares a bowl of soapy water with another convict. When Stan sits down the bowl is catapulted over the warden.

Stan wanders into the execution room and sits in the electric chair. A second man falls in the chair and drifts up to heaven after exploding.

Outside Stan narrowly avoids getting hit with a pick by a convict digging a tunnel. The tunnel comes into a room full of explosives. Stan hammers a stick of dynamite into the wall and they blow a hole into the chief warden's office. The convict and the warden fight. Stan tries to knock out the warden but hits the convict instead. A girl who entered the room tells the warden that Stan saved him.

Stan is released the next day, and he cries as he says goodbye to the head warden and the girl. He walks off with the warden's wallet and watch.

== Cast ==
- Stan Laurel - A convict
- Julie Leonard - The warden's daughter
- Agnes Ayres

== See also ==
- List of American films of 1924
