= Mandarin Mix-Up =

1924 film

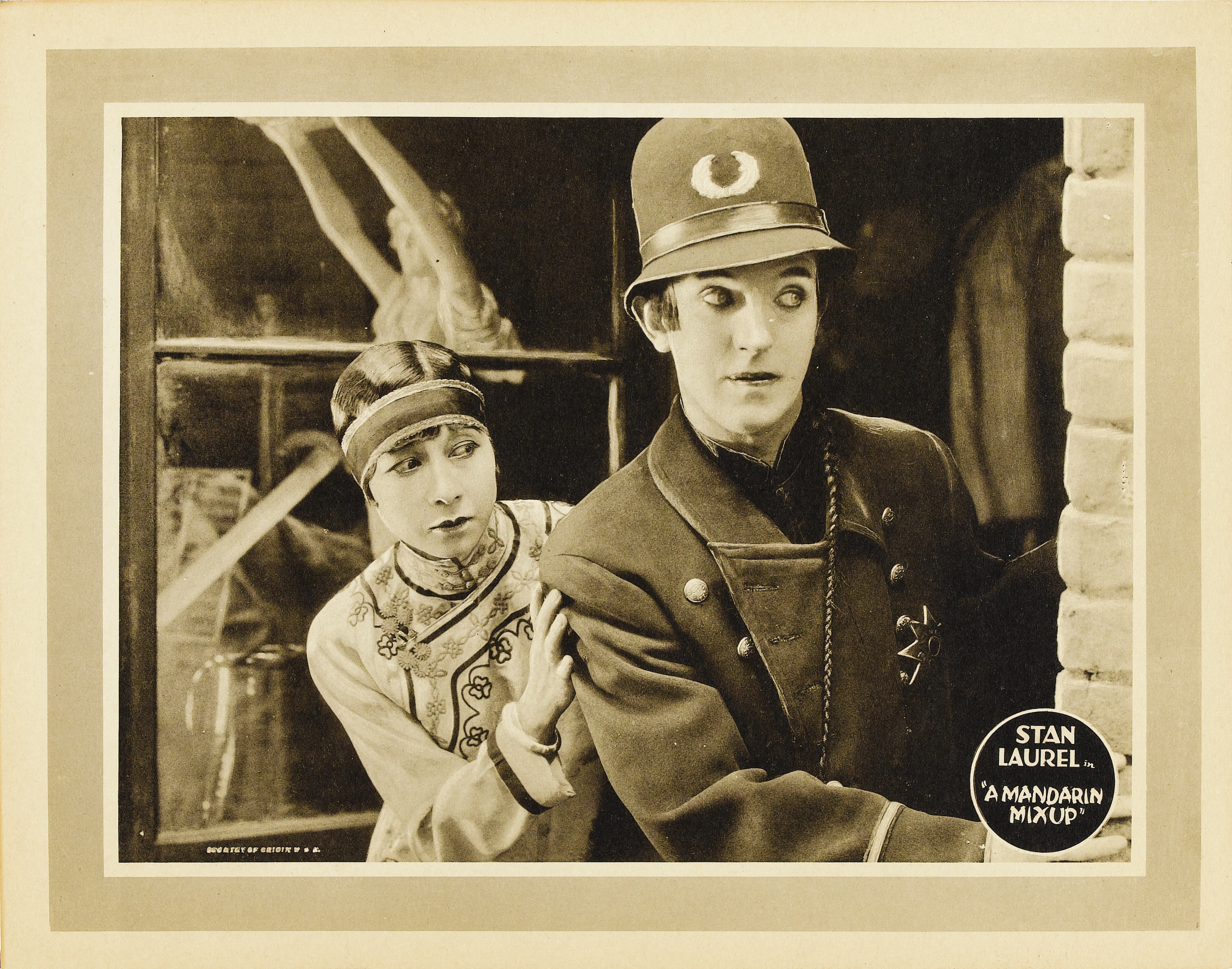
- Lobby card
- Directed by: Scott Pembroke
- Written by: Tay Garnett
- Produced by: Joe Rock
- Starring: Stan Laurel
- Release date: August 30, 1924
- Running time: 20 minutes
- Country: United States
- Language: Silent (English intertitles)

Mandarin Mix-Up is a 1924 American silent comedy film directed by Scott Pembroke and starring Stan Laurel.

== Plot ==
Stan is the new baby in the family and is shown in a high chair playing with a ball. His big brother is angry that the baby is throwing food at him and ties him into a laundry bag.

He is taken to a Chinese laundry and the story jumps twenty years. The family has raised him as their son and call him Sum Sap. He has a very long pigtail. He angers a Tong gangster and is in fear of his life. Sap falls in love with a Chinese girl and pursues her in slow motion. He falls into the Buddhist temple and angers the men. A battle begins between the tongs. Stan appears in a police uniform and the street battle stops.

With his uniform on he refuses to pay for a hot dog and is rude to the stall owner. One of the men draws a knife on him. He goes into a costume shop and disguises himself. The gang member tells him how he is going to slit Sum Sap's throat.

Whilst talking to a real policeman someone tries to kill him by dropping a vase on his head. After a few more things are dropped. Lili gives him a pistol and he fires it into the firework shop which explodes.

He marries his Chinese girlfriend Lili (Julie Leonard). Just then, her real parents and want to take her away. A bill poster is handed to him saying that Roger Cresus has left Sun Sap a million dollars because he loved him like a son.

== Cast ==
- Stan Laurel as Sum Sap
- Julie Leonard as China girl

== See also ==
- List of American films of 1924
