= Krakatoa (film) =

1933 film

- Written by: Forrest Izard
- Produced by: Joe Rock; E. W. Hammons
- Narrated by: Graham McNamee
- Edited by: Forrest Izard
- Production company: Educational Pictures
- Distributed by: Fox Film Corporation
- Release date: April 23, 1933 (United States)
- Running time: 26 minutes
- Country: United States
- Language: English

Krakatoa is a 1933 American Pre-Code short documentary film produced by Joe Rock. It won the Academy Award in 1934 for Best Short Subject (Novelty). Educational Pictures (or Educational Film Exchanges, Inc.) was the film distributor of the film.

This film was notable for overwhelming the sound systems of the cinemas of the time. In Australia, the distributors insisted on a power output of 10 watts RMS as a minimum for cinemas wishing to show the film. This was then considered a large system, and forced many cinemas to upgrade. A revised version was made in 1966 for the Library of Congress.

== Synopsis ==
The story describes how the 1883 eruption of Krakatoa on the island blew half of the large island into the air, producing a tsunami, and an air wave that was felt seven times around the globe. The eruption also emitted tons of dust that dimmed sunlight all over the world for many months.

== See also ==
- Krakatoa documentary and historical materials
