= Scott Pembroke =

American actor (1889–1951)

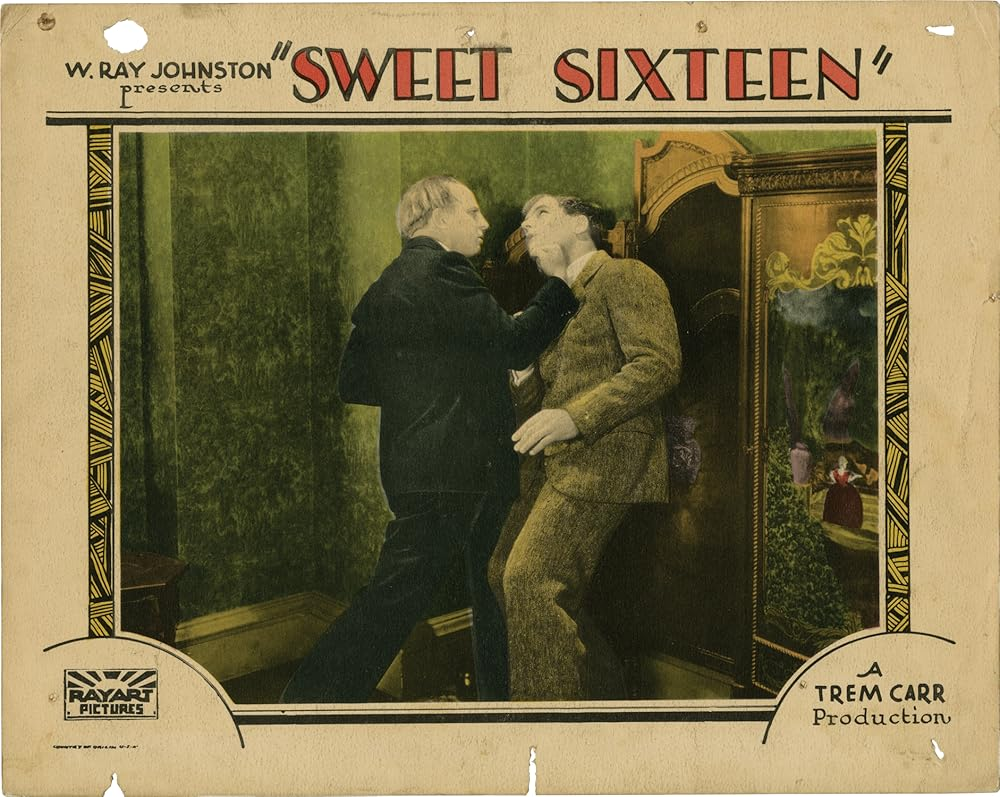
- Born: September 13, 1889; San Francisco, California, US
- Died: February 21, 1951 (aged 61); Pasadena, California, US
- Occupations: Film actor, director and screenwriter
- Years active: 1920–1937
- Spouse(s): Minnie Johanson (1916–1919; divorced); 1 child Dolores Gwendolyn Johnson (September 18, 1920 – 19??; divorced); Gertrude Short (December 5, 1925 – 19??; divorced)

Percy Scott Pembroke (September 13, 1889 – February 21, 1951) was an American director, actor and screenwriter. He directed more than 70 films between 1920 and 1937.

Born in San Francisco, California, Pembroke was the son of British-born parents, Samuel Joseph Pembroke and Marian—or Mary Ann—Scott.

Studios for which Pembroke directed films include Chadwick Pictures.

== Personal life and death ==
Pembroke was married to Gertrude Short.

On February 21, 1951, Pembroke died in Pasadena of a cerebral hemorrhage.

== Partial filmography ==
- A Country Hero (1917)
- The Girl Who Won Out (1917)
- The Law That Divides (1918)
- Winners of the West (1921)
- The Adventures of Tarzan (1921)
- The Adventures of Robinson Crusoe (1922)
- The Social Buccaneer (1923)
- Kill or Cure (1923)
- Gas and Air (1923)
- Her Dangerous Path (1923)
- Short Orders (1923)
- Rupert of Hee Haw (1924)
- Mandarin Mix-Up (1924)
- Detained (1924)
- Monsieur Don't Care (1924)
- West of Hot Dog (1924)
- Somewhere in Wrong (1925)
- Twins (1925)
- Pie-Eyed (1925)
- The Snow Hawk (1925)
- Navy Blue Days (1925)
- Dr. Pyckle and Mr. Pryde (1925)
- The Terror of Bar X (1927)
- For Ladies Only (1927)
- Ragtime (1927)
- Cactus Trails (1927)
- Polly of the Movies (1927)
- Galloping Thunder (1927)
- Gypsy of the North (1928)
- Sweet Sixteen (1928)
- The Black Pearl (1928)
- The Divine Sinner (1928)
- The Branded Man (1928)
- The Law and the Man (1928)
- Sisters of Eve (1928)
- Should a Girl Marry? (1928)
- Shanghai Rose (1929)
- Two Sisters (1929)
- The Medicine Man (1930)
- The Jazz Cinderella (1930)
- The Lawless Nineties (1936)
- The Oregon Trail (1936)
- Telephone Operator (1937)
