= The Snow Hawk =

1925 film

- Directed by: Scott Pembroke; Joe Rock
- Written by: Tay Garnett
- Produced by: Joe Rock
- Starring: Stan Laurel
- Cinematography: Edgar Lyons
- Release date: April 30, 1925
- Running time: 20 minutes
- Country: United States
- Languages: Silent film English intertitles

The Snow Hawk is a 1925 film directed by Scott Pembroke and Joe Rock and starring Stan Laurel. It is an extant film.

== Cast ==
- Stan Laurel - Mountie
- Glen Cavender - Midnight Mike
- Julie Leonard - Storekeeper's daughter

== See also ==
- List of American films of 1925
- Stan Laurel filmography
