= Monsieur Don't Care =

1924 film

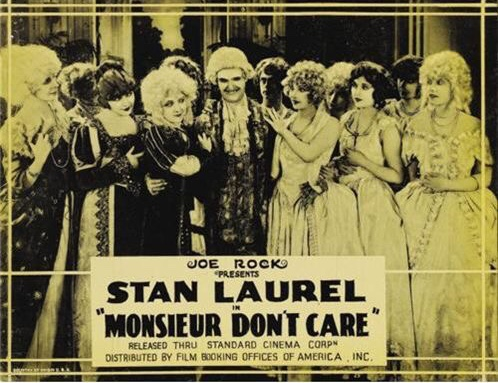
- Directed by: Scott Pembroke; Joe Rock
- Written by: Monte Brice; Lew Lipton
- Produced by: Joe Rock
- Starring: Stan Laurel
- Cinematography: Reginald Lyons
- Distributed by: Film Booking Offices of America
- Release date: December 1, 1924
- Running time: 20 min
- Country: United States
- Languages: Silent film English intertitles

Monsieur Don't Care is a 1924 American silent comedy film starring Stan Laurel as "Rhubarb Vaselino". The film is a parody of the Rudolph Valentino film Monsieur Beaucaire (1924). Laurel, during the years 1922-25, had indeed "specialized in parodies of popular hits of the day". Like Olcott's film, the short is set in France under Louis XV.

== Cast ==
- Stan Laurel as Rhubarb Vaselino
- Melba Brownrigg

== See also ==
- List of American films of 1924
