= Dr. Pyckle and Mr. Pryde =

1925 film

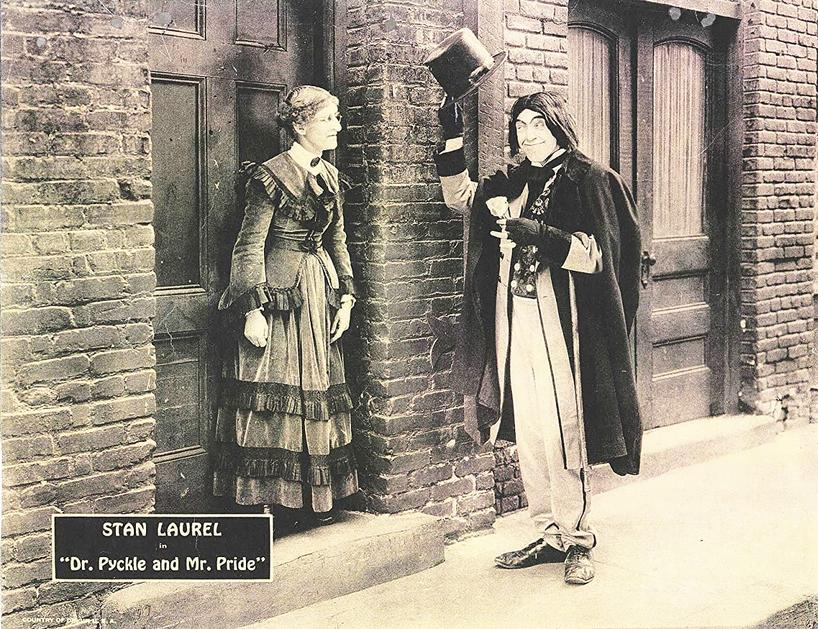
- Lobby card
- Directed by: Scott Pembroke; Joe Rock
- Written by: Tay Garnett
- Produced by: Joe Rock
- Starring: Stan Laurel
- Cinematography: Edgar Lyons
- Production company: Standard Photoplay Company
- Distributed by: Selznick Distributing Corp.
- Release date: July 30, 1925
- Running time: 21 minutes
- Country: United States
- Language: Silent (English intertitles)

Dr. Pyckle and Mr. Pryde (or Dr. Pyckle and Mr. Pride) is a 1925 American silent, black-and-white comedy horror film, directed by Scott Pembroke and Joe Rock (also the producer).

The film itself is both a spoof of the previous Dr. Jekyll and Mr. Hyde films (e.g. Dr. Jekyll and Mr. Hyde (1912) and Dr. Jekyll and Mr. Hyde (1920), both adaptations of the 1886 novella by Robert Louis Stevenson Strange Case of Dr Jekyll and Mr Hyde). The film stars Stan Laurel as the title character.

== Plot and characters ==
Dr. Pyckle and Mr. Pryde (1925)

Dr. Stanislaus Pyckle successfully separates the good and evil of man's nature with the use of a powerful drug -- "Dr. Pyckle's 58th Variety", a spoof of "Heinz's 57". Transforming into the personality of Mr. Pryde, he terrorizes the town with unspeakable acts. His crime including stealing a boy's ice cream, cheating at marbles, and popping a bag behind a lady pedestrian.

While the townspeople track down the criminal, Mr. Pride locks himself in the laboratory and transforms back to Dr. Pyckle. The doctor assures the townspeople that he hasn't seen the "fiend" they were after. While he talks, the drug used for the transformation spills in the plate of food of the doctor's dog. Dr. Pyckle confronts the fiendish dog when he locks the door and the townspeople leave.

Once again, Mr. Pride emerges and brings havoc to the town. He is again chased down by the townspeople. He enters the lab and transforms back into Pyckle, and again assures the townspeople he has not seen the fiend. His assistant begs the doctor to open and comfort him, but he transforms back into Mr. Pride. He opens the door to the assistant and locks it again. She sees Pride and screams. She unsuccessfully tries to knock him out. The townspeople hurry back. Existing versions of the film end abruptly at this point without a resolution.

=== Note ===
The appearance of the fiendish Mr. Pride is an obvious spoof on the make-up designed for John Barrymore as Mr. Hyde. Also spoofed are the sudden and strange movements Barrymore's Jekyll makes during the transformation, as well as Hyde's confrontation with Millicent, Jekyll's fiancée, when Hyde lets her inside the lab. Other scenes show obvious parodies of other Dr. Jekyll and Mr. Hyde films (e.g. Dr. Jekyll and Mr. Hyde (1912) and the Haydon film from 1920).

== Cast ==
- Stan Laurel as Dr. Stanislaus Pyckle (a play on the actor's name)/Mr. Pryde (sometimes noted as Mr. Pride)
- Julie Leonard as Dr. Pyckle's assistant
- Pete the Dog (as Pete the Pup)
- Syd Crossley (uncredited bit role)
- Dot Farley (uncredited bit role)

== Production ==
The following year (1926), Stan Laurel began his years-long collaboration with Oliver Hardy, and together they would make over 100 films. Pete the dog later starred in a series of Buster Brown films as Buster's dog Tige. The familiar circle around his eye was painted on by a makeup man.

== Reception ==
"It has been extremely well-produced, but the story is not one that lends itself particularly to comedy, although Laurel does fine work.", notes The Palgrave Encyclopedia of American Horror Film Shorts.

"Laurel's hilarious two-reeler Dr. Pyckle and Mr. Pride (1925) offers some insightful commentary on the 1920s Dr. Jekyll films — meditating on the important question of Hyde's evildoings", commented The History of British Literature on Film, 1895-2015.

The film was compared to earlier British "theatrical parodies (such as Frankenstitch, Surrey Theatre, 1824; and Dr Freckle and Mr Snide, Dockstader's Minstrel Hall, New York, 1887)".
