= The Girl Who Won Out =

- Directed by: Eugene Moore
- Written by: Charles J. Wilson
- Starring: Violet MacMillan; Barbara Conley; Scott Pembroke
- Production company: Universal Pictures
- Distributed by: Universal Pictures
- Release date: October 8, 1917
- Running time: 50 minutes
- Country: United States
- Languages: Silent; English intertitles

The Girl Who Won Out is a 1917 American silent drama film directed by Eugene Moore and starring Violet MacMillan, Barbara Conley and Scott Pembroke.

== Cast ==
- Violet MacMillan as Nancy Grimm
- Barbara Conley as Ellen
- Scott Pembroke as Chester Noble
- Mattie Witting as Mrs. Harvey
- Charles Hill Mailes as Mr. Wicks
- Gertrude Astor as Mrs. Walsh
- L.M. Wells as Mr. Noble
- Sherman Bainbridge as Jack Beal

== Bibliography ==
- Robert B. Connelly. The Silents: Silent Feature Films, 1910-36, Volume 40, Issue 2. December Press, 1998.
