= Half a Man (film) =

1925 film

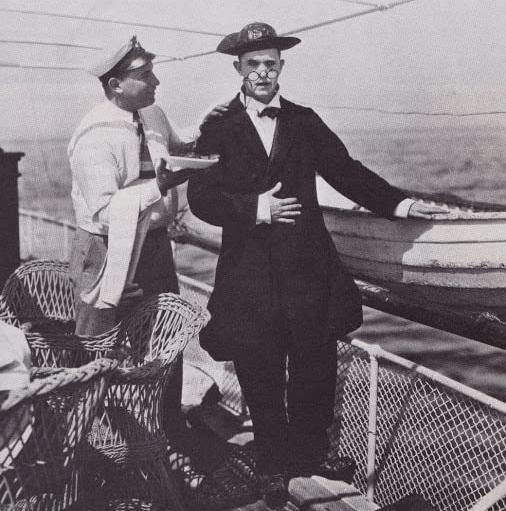
- Directed by: Joe Rock; Harry Sweet
- Written by: Tay Garnett
- Produced by: Joe Rock
- Starring: Stan Laurel
- Cinematography: Edgar Lyons
- Production company: Standard Cinema Corp.
- Distributed by: Selznick Releasing
- Release date: August 30, 1925
- Running time: 20 minutes
- Country: United States
- Languages: Silent film English intertitles

Half a Man is a 1925 American silent comedy film starring Stan Laurel. A print exists.

== Cast ==
- Stan Laurel as Winchell McSweeney
- Tui Bow as Shipwrecked woman (uncredited)
- Julie Leonard as Shipwrecked woman (uncredited)
- Blanche Payson as Shipwrecked woman (uncredited)
- Murray Rock as Boat crew (uncredited)

== See also ==
- List of American films of 1925
