= Lois Neilson =

American actress (1895–1990)

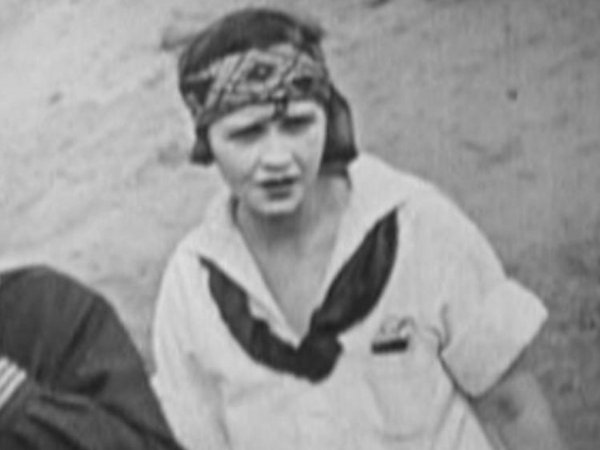
- Neilson in 1919
- Born: September 7, 1895; Tulare, California, US
- Died: July 9, 1990 (aged 94); Los Angeles, California, US
- Occupation: Actress
- Years active: 1919-1920
- Spouse: Stan Laurel (m. 1926; div. 1934)
- Children: 2

Lois Neilson Laurel (September 7, 1895 – July 9, 1990) was an American silent movie actress who became actor and comedian Stan Laurel's first wife.

== Early life and career ==
She was born in Tulare, California. Her family moved to Santa Cruz, California in 1909, where she entered high school in 1910. She acted in high school drama productions alongside ZaSu Pitts. Pitts invited Neilson to join her in Hollywood in 1918, where she began to appear in silent films. She and Laurel both appeared in Do You Love Your Wife? in 1919.

== Personal life ==
Neilson and Laurel began sharing her apartment in 1925, and married on August 13, 1926. Their daughter, also named Lois, was born on December 10, 1927. Their son, also named Stanley, was born two months premature in 1930, and lived for only nine days. Neilson and Laurel divorced in December 1934. Through her daughter, she was the mother-in-law of actor Rand Brooks, best remembered for his role of Charles Hamilton in the movie Gone with the Wind (1939).

== Death ==
Neilson died in Los Angeles at the age of 94 from natural causes. Daughter Lois died in 2017 at age 89.

== Filmography ==
Year	Title	Role	Notes
1919	Do You Love Your Wife?		Short film
1919	The Spotted Nag		Short film
1919	Brown Eyes and Bank Notes		Short film
1919	A Puppy Love Panic		Short film
1919	A Roof Garden Rough House		Short film
1919	Dainty Damsels and Bogus Counts		Short film
1919	Brownie's Doggone Tricks	The Vamp (as Louise Neilson)	Short film
1919	Oh! You East Lynn!	The Chorus girl (as Louise Neilson)	Short film
1919	Weak Hearts and Wild Lions	Queen of the Circus	Short film
1920	Loose Lions and Fast Lovers		Short film
1920	My Dog, Pal		Short film
1920	The Honor of the Range	Betty Hall	Short film, final film role
