= The Sleuth (film) =

1925 film

- Directed by: Joe Rock; Harry Sweet
- Written by: Tay Garnett
- Produced by: Joe Rock
- Starring: Stan Laurel; Glen Cavender; Alberta Vaughn; Anita Garvin
- Cinematography: Edgar Lyons
- Release date: June 30, 1925
- Running time: 20 minutes
- Country: United States
- Languages: Silent film English intertitles

The Sleuth is a 1925 American silent comedy film starring Stan Laurel. It is an extant film.

== Cast ==
- Stan Laurel - Webster Dingle
- Glen Cavender - The husband
- Alberta Vaughn - The wife
- Anita Garvin - The other woman

== See also ==
- List of American films of 1925
