= Twins (1925 film) =

1925 film

- Directed by: Scott Pembroke; Joe Rock
- Written by: Tay Garnett (intertitles)
- Produced by: Joe Rock
- Starring: Stan Laurel
- Cinematography: Edgar Lyons
- Production company: Standard Photoplay Company
- Distributed by: Film Booking Offices of America
- Release date: February 28, 1925
- Running time: 20 minutes
- Country: United States
- Languages: Silent; English intertitles

Twins is a 1925 American silent comedy film featuring Stan Laurel.

== Plot ==
This plot summary comes from the book Stan Without Ollie:

A far-fetched, somewhat predictable but very funny comedy, Twins anticipates the twin brother/mistaken identity premise that would be used for Our Relations (1936), one of Laurel and Hardy's most polished feature-length films.

Engaged to be married, Stan runs into his identical twin brother, who is heading for Seattle on business. Stan is invited to stay at his brother's home, although for reasons never made clear, the brother has never told his shrewish wife about Stan's existence. When the wife meets Stan's fiancée, she sees a picture of the girl with Stan and immediately concludes that her husband is cheating on her. The wife goes back home, where she encounters Stan, whom she mistakes for her spouse. Stan, on the other hand, has no idea who this is... (continued)

This shorter summary comes from the original copyright filing at the Library of Congress:

In "TWINS" Stan Laurel portrays the role of Twin Brothers and the complications which develop from the fact that one is mistaken for another in this two reel comedy can easily be imagined.

This vehicle affords Laurel great opportunity to portray two distinctly different roles and gives him full rein to exhibit his versatility as a Screen Comedian.

== Cast ==
- Stan Laurel as Stan/his twin
- Julie Leonard as Stan's girl
- Alberta Vaughn as The wife

== See also ==
- List of American films of 1925
