= Somewhere in Wrong =

1925 film

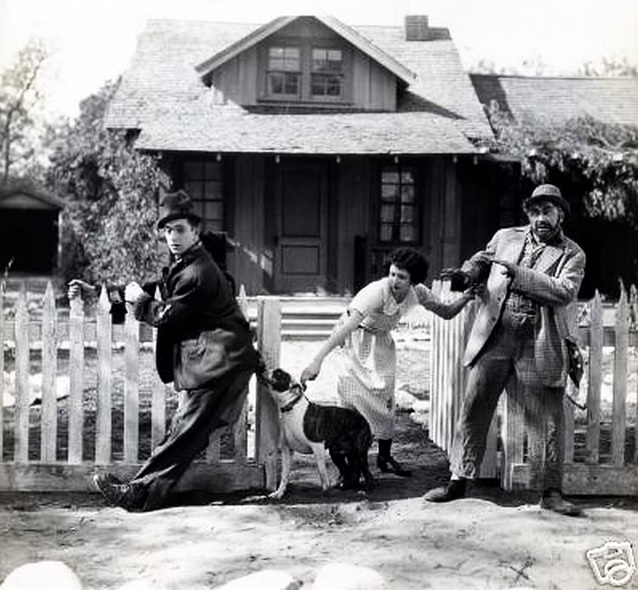
- Stan Laurel, Julie Leonard, and Max Asher in Somewhere in Wrong
- Directed by: Scott Pembroke; Joe Rock
- Written by: Tay Garnett
- Produced by: Joe Rock
- Starring: Stan Laurel
- Cinematography: Edgar Lyons
- Production company: Standard Photoplay Company
- Distributed by: Film Booking Offices of America
- Release date: January 30, 1925
- Running time: 20 minutes
- Country: United States
- Languages: Silent film English intertitles

Somewhere in Wrong is a 1925 American film starring Stan Laurel.

== Cast ==
- Stan Laurel as A Tramp
- Max Asher as A Tramp
- Julie Leonard as The Farmer's Daughter
- Charles King as A Suitor
- Pete the Dog (as Pete the Pup)

== See also ==
- List of American films of 1925
