= Joe Rock =

American actor and filmmaker (1893–1984)

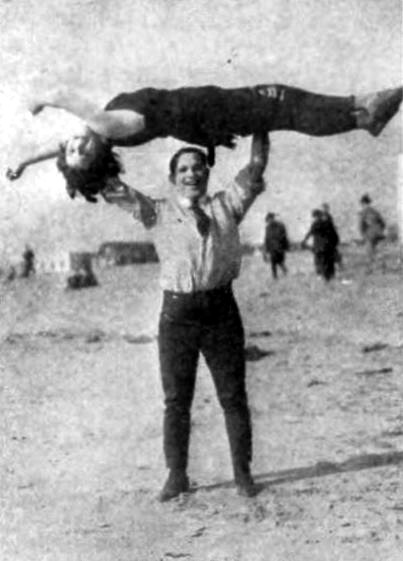
- Joe Rock and actress Patsy de Forest at the beach in 1920
- Born: Joseph Simberg; December 25, 1893; New York City, U.S.
- Died: December 5, 1984 (aged 90); Sherman Oaks, California, U.S.
- Occupations: Producer; director; screenwriter; actor
- Years active: 1915–55
- Spouse(s): Louise Granville (1922–68) (her death); 2 children Phillip Rock and Felippa Rock
- Awards: 1933 Academy Award for Best Live Action Short Film – Krakatoa

Joe Rock (born Joseph Simberg, December 25, 1893 – December 5, 1984) was an American film producer, director, actor, and screenwriter. He produced a series of 12 two reel short subject comedies starring Stan Laurel in the 1920s.

== Career ==
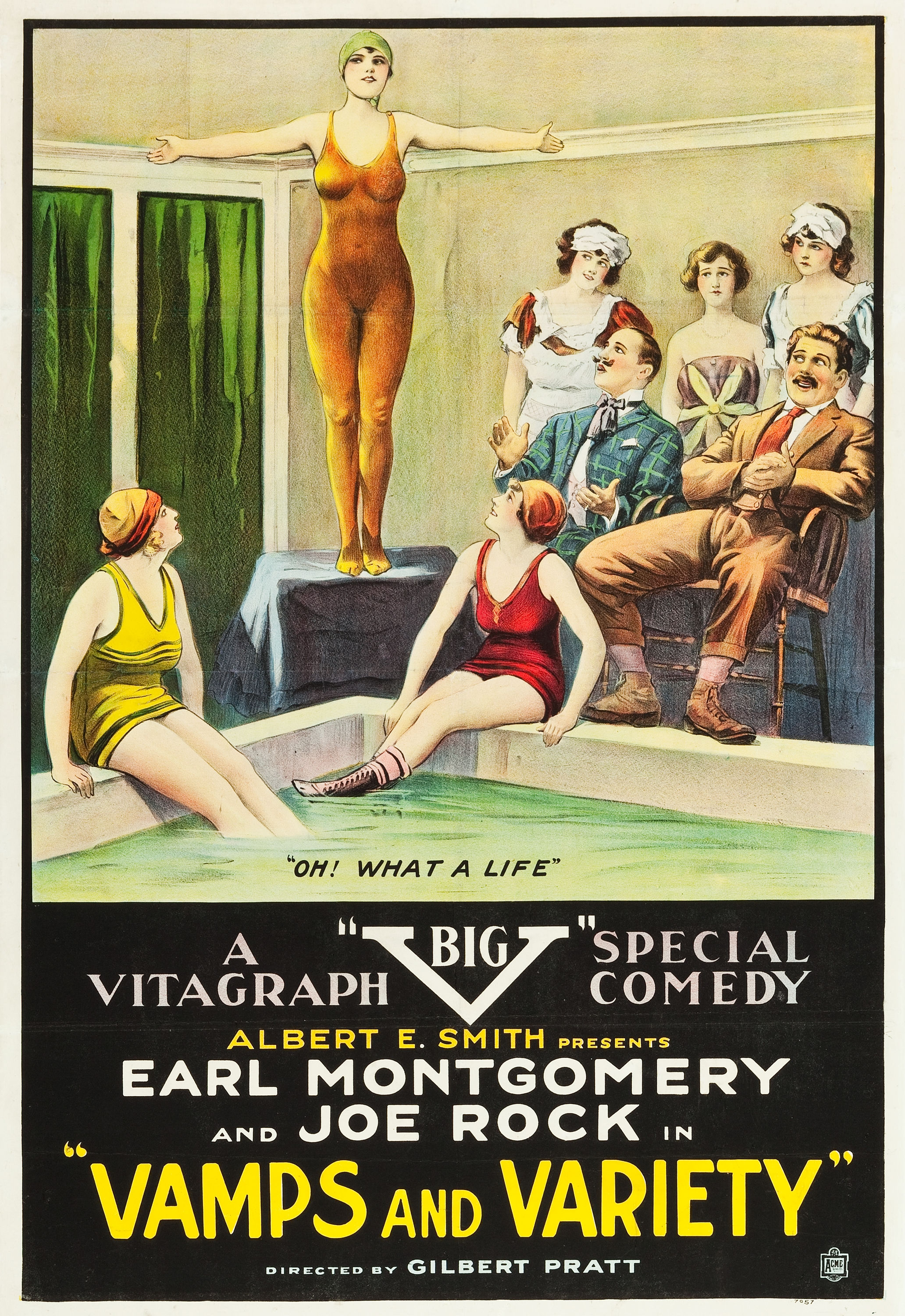
Poster for Vamps and Variety (1919)

Joe Rock began his career as a stunt double for Mary Pickford. He soon became a comedian in silent films working under his real name, Joe Simberg. He had a broad grin and protruding ears, which gave him a comical appearance – but soon found greater success as a producer.

A short-lived career with Vitagraph Studios as a comedian teamed with Earl Montgomery in countless comedy shorts such as Hash and Havoc (1916), Stowaways and Strategy (1917), Farms and Fumbles (1918), Harems and Hookum (1919), Zip and Zest (1919), Vamps and Variety (1919), Rubes and Robbers (1919), Cave and Coquettes (1919), Throbs and Thrills (1920), Loafers and Lovers (1920), and Sauce and Senoritas (1920).

In the book Comedy is a Man in Trouble: Slapstick in American Movies by Alan Dale, Joe Rock described the two-reelers he made with Earl Montgomery saying, "We always finished our comedies with a shot of us running away from a cop, a schoolteacher, or a principal, and then running smack into them again. If we'd run away from cops, we'd run back into cops."

Rock then enlisted in the U.S. Army for infantry service in World War I.

=== Stan Laurel ===
By 1924, Stan Laurel had forsaken the stage for full-time film work, and was still involved with actress Mae Dahlberg. Among the films in which they jointly appeared was the 1922 parody, Mud and Sand. Around this time, Mae started interfering with Laurel's work and was holding him back. Laurel insisted (no doubt with pressure from her) that she be in his every picture, but audiences didn't like her. When Joe Rock put Laurel under contract for twelve two-reel comedies, the contract had one unusual stipulation, that Dahlberg was not to appear in any of the films. It was felt that her temperament was hindering his career. When she balked, Rock held firm, finally offering her a most unusual and humiliating deal. He would give her several thousand dollars, along with some jewels she had pawned, if she would go back to Australia. When Stan showed no inclination to demur, she accepted the offer. The ship's purser had strict instructions: Mae would not receive her payment until the ship was a day out at sea. Stan was finally free. Without any distractions, Stan finished the twelve films ahead of schedule, although he was still technically under contract to Joe Rock. Stan next joined the Hal Roach studio as a writer and director, but due to the contract with Joe, could not act in any of the films.

The twelve two-reel comedies were Mandarin Mix-Up (1924), Detained (1924), Monsieur Don't Care (1924), West of Hot Dog (1924), Somewhere in Wrong (1925), Twins (1925), Pie-Eyed (1925), The Snow Hawk (1925), Navy Blue Days (1925), The Sleuth (1925), Dr. Pyckle and Mr. Pryde (1925), Half a Man (1925).

=== Ton of Fun ===
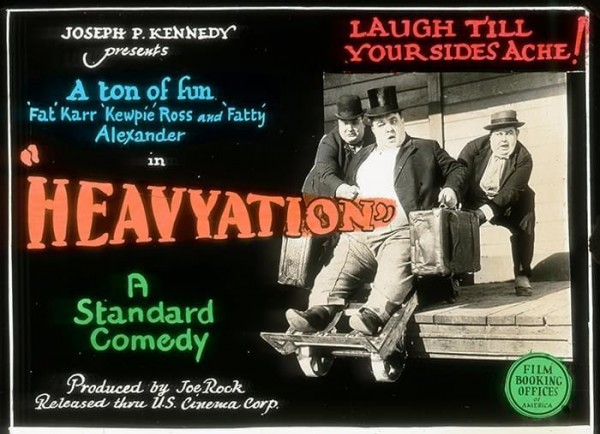
"Heavyation", one of "A Ton of Fun"'s shorts.

From the Joe Rock Studios came the "A Ton Of Fun" series of comedy shorts, promoted at the time as 'starring the three fattest men on the screen'. The series was launched in 1925 and ran two years. Alternatively known as The Three Fatties, they were played in order of girth by Hilliard "Fat" Karr, Kewpie Ross and Frank "Fatty" Alexander. The films were Tailoring (1925), All Tied Up (1925), Three Wise Goofs (1925), Heavy Love (1926), The Heavy Parade (1926), Three of a Kind (1926), Old Tin Shoes (1927), Three Missing Links (1927), and Campus Romeos (1927). Produced by Joe Rock, the shorts were made by Poverty Row studio Standard Cinema Corporation and released by Joseph P. Kennedy Sr.'s Film Booking Offices of America, (F.B.O.).

Ironically, Rock did not think The Three Fatties were fat enough. Frank Alexander and Kewpie Ross were actually padded far beyond their natural waistlines. Built on the premise that three fat men were funnier than one, Rock created a surprising number of outlandish situations for the trio during the series long run.

=== Elstree Studios ===
The Neptune Film Company opened the first studios in Borehamwood in 1914. It contained just a single small windowless stage (the first "dark stage" in England), relying entirely on electricity from a gas powered generator for lighting. Production ceased during 1917 and the studio was sold to the Ideal Film Company who used the site up until 1924. During 1928 the studio was sold to Ludwig Blattner. The Blattner Studio was leased to Joe Rock Productions during 1934 and 2 years later they purchased the site. Joe Rock appointed Ludwig Blattner's son Gerry as the studio manager. Rock Productions built 4 new large stages and began making films including the feature The Edge of the World (1937). These studios would eventually (in 1984) become BBC Elstree Centre, Clarendon Road Studios, Borehamwood.

=== Michael Powell ===
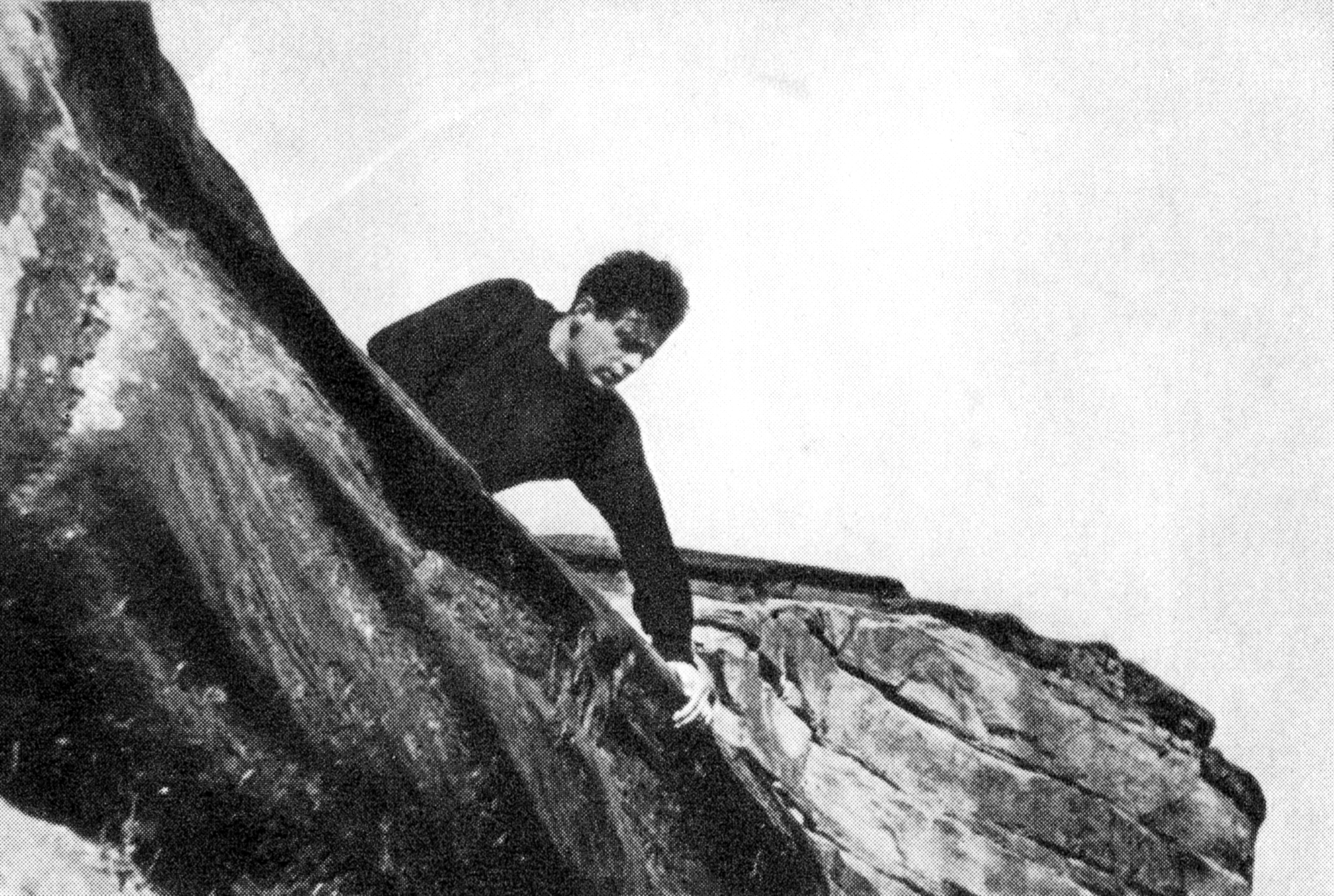
Niall MacGinnis in The Edge of the World (1937)

In 1935 Rock met director Michael Powell. In return for Powell agreeing to direct The Man Behind the Mask, Rock agreed to back the filming of what would become The Edge of the World, Powell's directorial breakthrough.

== Krakatoa ==
As a boy, Rock was an avid reader. He had been very impressed by a book that described the Krakatoa eruption of 1883. In that year, an obscure island in Indonesia exploded in one of the biggest volcanic eruptions of recorded history: the explosion was heard thousands of miles away, and many people died. In 1933, for the fiftieth anniversary of the eruption, Joe Rock produced a documentary titled Krakatoa: partly about the island's history before and after the eruption, but mostly about the eruption. Making the documentary was a challenge, because Joe had no film footage of the island and he was unable to locate any witnesses who recalled the original 1883 event. After making this movie on a very low budget and releasing it, Joe went on a trip to England. He had formed a production company to make Krakatoa, but he permitted that company to go out of business because he had no further projects envisioned for it.

== Academy Award ==
Rock experienced the longest wait between winning an Academy Award and actually receiving it. Rock produced the 1933 film Krakatoa, a documentary about the volcanic eruption of 1883, and won the Academy Award for Best Short Subject (Novelty) in 1933. He was in Europe at the time that the award was announced, and had no representative to claim the trophy. His name did not appear in the film's credits, his production company failed, and when he returned to the United States he could no longer document that he was the head of the production company named in the film's credits.

Some 50 years later, Rock located documents which established his claim, and the academy gave him his statuette.

== Later years ==
In 1955, Rock co-produced a documentary exploitation film about the Mau Mau uprising called Mau Mau.

== Personal life ==
Joe Rock was married to actress Louise Granville. They had two children actress Felippa Rock born in 1923 and writer Phillip Rock born in 1926. His grandson is actor Christopher Pate.

== Selected filmography ==
- A Ghostly Night (1924)
- A Woman's Heart (1926)
- A Desperate Moment (1926)
- The Call of the Wilderness (1926)
- Pretty Clothes (1927)
- Stranded (1927)
- Outcast Souls (1928)
- Burning Up Broadway (1928)
- Krakatoa
- Strictly Illegal (1935)
- The Man Behind the Mask (1936)
- Cotton Queen (1937)
- Boys Will Be Girls (1937)
- Rhythm Racketeer (1937)
- Sing as You Swing (1937)
- Mau Mau (1955)
