= Pie-Eyed =

1925 film by Scott Pembroke and Joe Rock

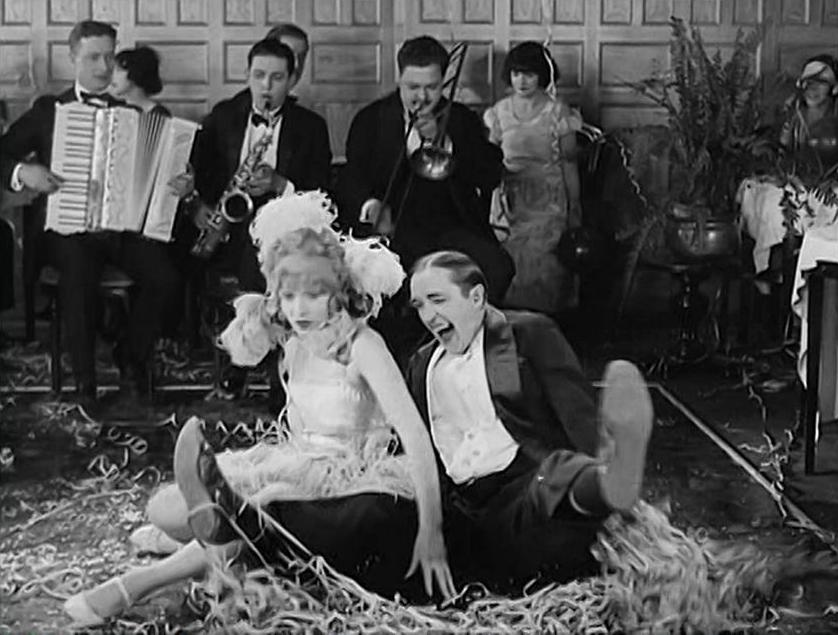
- Directed by: Scott Pembroke; Joe Rock
- Written by: Tay Garnett
- Produced by: Joe Rock
- Starring: Stan Laurel
- Cinematography: Edgar Lyons
- Release date: March 30, 1925
- Running time: 18 minutes
- Country: United States
- Language: Silent with English intertitles

Pie-Eyed is a 1925 American silent comedy film starring Stan Laurel. The film is made at the peak of the Prohibition era so is dealing with "illegal activity" even if it is in a humorous manner. The club owner appears a mix of Gene Tunney and Jack Johnson the latter being a well-known owner of speakeasies.

== Plot ==
Pie-Eyed (1925)

Stanley is a member of the New Temperance Society but wants to check out the evils of drink. He staggers around a speakeasy with a bottle of whiskey in hand.

The boss, an ex-boxer tells him to sit down and behave. Stan gets a black eye and a steak which was ordered gets put on it.

He observes a young couple at the next table playing tricks with a spoon. He tries to copy and catapults a spoon down the back of the girl's dress. He goes over and sticks his hand down to search for his spoon. He retrieves the spoon and she shoves him back, landing him in the band. He breaks the trombone. The boss comes over and gives him another warning.

Stan's soup arrives then the bosses wife arrives: a very young dancing girl. Stan joins her on the dance floor. The boss pulls him off and puffs his chest. Stan copies.

Stan sits and orders a bottle of spirits. The poured glass spills and burns the table like acid. Stan gets thrown out.

On his walk home he tumbles into a tree guard and thinks he is in jail. He drops his top hat into the road and kicks it under a car when he tries to pick it up. He gets soaked by the street-cleaning wagon.

He loops his coat around a lamp-post when he puts it on and goes around in circles until a policeman arrives and asks where he lives. He can't remember so he gives him "his card" but it is the speakeasy owner's card. He goes back to the address on the card with the policeman. It is the apartment of the club owner. The policeman has to take him home several times. He gets put in the double bed.

The owner and his wife return. She tells him to hide but he goes back to bed. The owner joins him and takes a few minutes to realise it is not his wife. A chase ensues before Stan jumps out of a window and lands in tar. The policeman reappears and also gets stuck. Stan takes off his shoes and leaves barefoot.

== Cast ==
- Stan Laurel as Stanley the Drunk
- Glen Cavender as Jack Tinney the Nightclub manager
- Thelma Hill as Mrs Tinney, Girl in club
- Budd Fine as the Policeman

== See also ==
- List of American films of 1925
