= Ludwig Blattner =

German inventor, film producer and studio owner

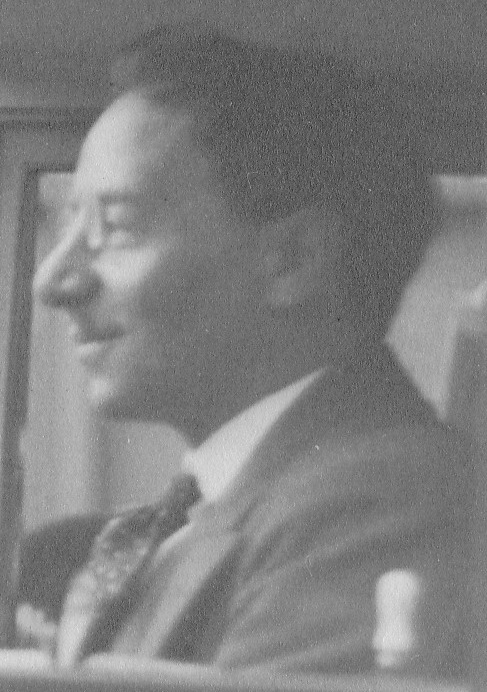
- Blattner in 1923
- Born: 1880; German Empire
- Died: 29 October 1935 (aged 54–55); Elstree, Hertfordshire, England
- Other name: Louis Blattner
- Occupations: Producer, inventor
- Years active: 1912–1934
- Spouse: Margaret Mary Gracey
- Children: 2

Ludwig Blattner (5 February 1880 – 29 October 1935) was a German-born inventor, film producer, director and studio owner in the United Kingdom, and developer of one of the earliest magnetic sound recording devices.

== Career ==
Ludwig Blattner, also known as Louis Blattner, was a pioneer of early magnetic sound recording, licensing a steel wire-based design from German inventor Dr. Kurt Stille, and enhancing it to use steel tape instead of wire, thereby creating an early form of tape recorder. This device was marketed as the Blattnerphone. Whilst on a promotional tour of his sound recording technology in 1928 he would choose ladies from the audience to dance with to music being played from a Blattnerphone.

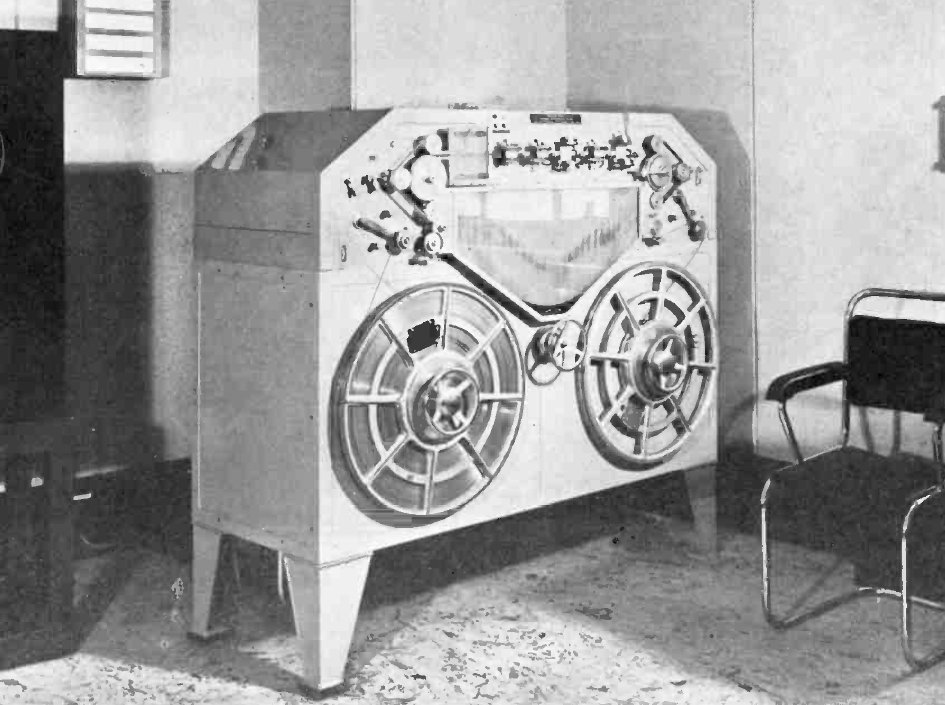
Blattnerphone steel tape recorder at BBC studios, London, 1937

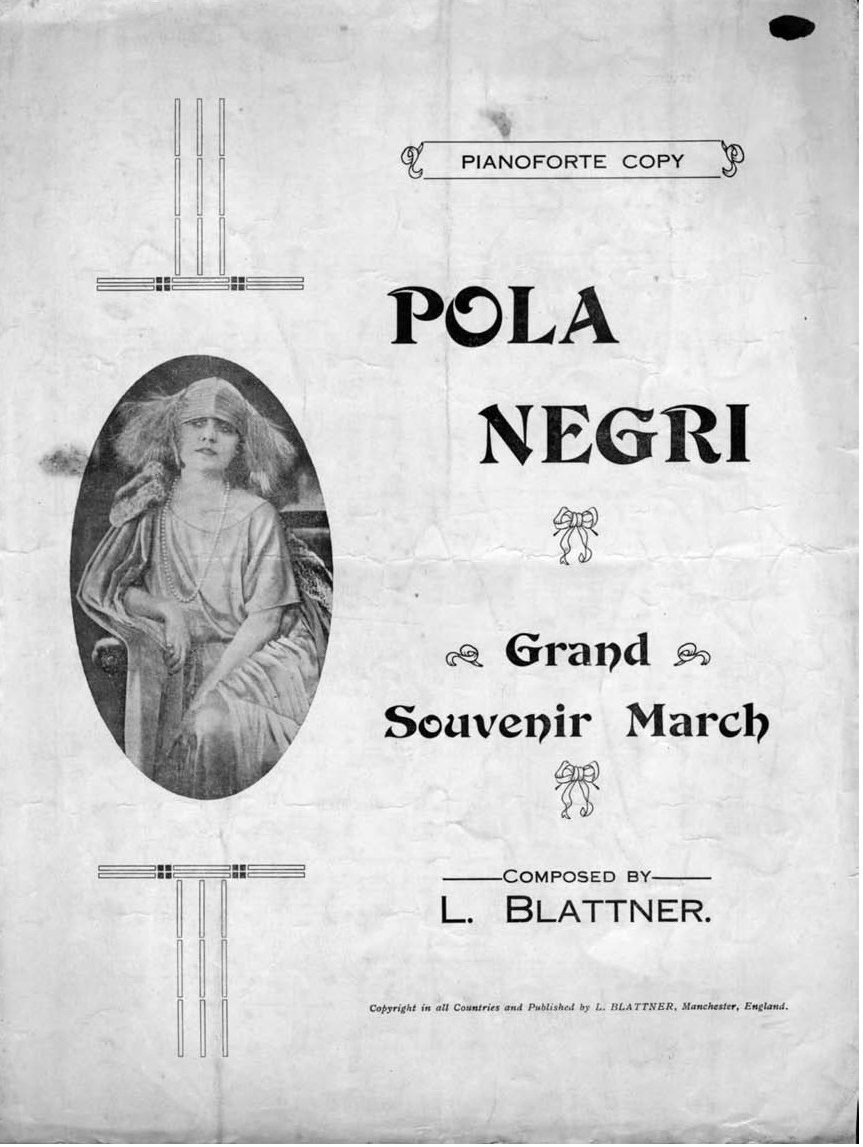
Front cover of sheet music inspired by Pola Negri, composed by Ludwig Blattner

Prior to the First World War, Blattner was involved in the entertainment industry in the Liverpool City Region: he managed the "La Scala" cinema in Wallasey from 1912 to 1914, conducted the cinema's orchestra, and composed a waltz "The Ladies of Wallasey". In about 1920 he moved to Manchester where he managed a chain of cinemas. There, in 1923 he composed and published a piece of music about the film actress Pola Negri titled "Pola Negri Grand Souvenir March". Later in the 1920s, he bought the British film rights to Lion Feuchtwanger's novel Jew Süss although the film was not made until 1934 after Blattner had sold the rights to Gaumont British. In early 1928, press reports appeared saying that Blattner was planning a 400-acre "Hollywood, England" complex with a hospital, 150 room hotel, aeroplane club and the largest collection of studios in the world, for which he was planning to spend between 2 million and 5 million pounds. Blattner later formed the Ludwig Blattner Picture Corporation in Borehamwood in the studio complex that is now known as BBC Elstree Centre, buying the Ideal Film Company studio (formerly known as Neptune Studios) in 1928, renaming it as Blattner Studios. In 1928 his company produced a series of short films of musical performances such as "Albert Sandler and His Violin [Serenade – Schubert]" and "Teddy Brown and His Xylophone". The best known films produced by his film company were A Knight in London (1929) and My Lucky Star (1933), which was co-directed by Blattner. Films produced by other companies at the Blattner Studios included Dorothy Gish and Charles Laughton's first drama talkie Wolves (1930), the 1934 adaptation of Edgar Allan Poe's short story "The Tell-Tale Heart", Rookery Nook (1930) and A Lucky Sweep (1932).

Ludwig Blattner was also involved in an early colour motion picture process: in about 1929 he bought the rights for the use outside the USA of a lenticular colour process called Keller-Dorian cinematography. This process was then known as the Blattner Keller-Dorian process, which lost out to rival colour systems.

Ludwig Blattner originally intended the Blattnerphone to be used as a system of recording and playback for talking pictures, but the BBC saw its potential to record and "timeshift" BBC radio programmes for use with the BBC Empire Service, and rented several Blattnerphones from 1930 onwards, one of which was used to record King George V's speech at the opening of the India Round Table Conference on 12 November 1930. The 1932 BBC Year Book (covering November 1930 to October 1931) said:

In some ways the most important event of the year has been the adoption by the B.B.C. of the Blattnerphone recording apparatus described in the Technical Section. For years the B.B.C 's programme officials have longed for a machine which would be useful on the one hand for recording outside events such as commentaries, speeches, etc., of which normally no record existed, and on the other for rehearsals, and in particular for enabling certain broadcasters to hear themselves as others hear them.

In 1939, the BBC used a Blattnerphone (not the later Marconi-Stille recorder) to record Prime Minister Neville Chamberlain's announcement to Britain of the outbreak of World War II.

In 1930, Blattner promoted a version of his Blattnerphone technology as one of the first telephone answering machines, and in 1931 Blatter promoted a version of the Blattnerphone as the Blattner Book Reader, an early Audiobook playback system for the blind.

Despite being a "promoter of genius with far-seeing ideas about technical developments in sound and colour" according to the film director Michael Powell, business problems with the studio, due to the advent of rival talking picture systems, led to heavy financial loss, and in 1934 Joe Rock leased Elstree Studios from Ludwig Blattner, and bought it outright in 1936, a year after Blattner's suicide.

== Personal life ==
Born into a Jewish family in Altona, Hamburg, Blattner first visited Great Britain in 1897. He appears to have returned later and worked for a while in the publicity department of Mellin's Food probably arranged through family contact with Gustav Mellin. He moved to Birkenhead by 1901 and settled in New Brighton, Merseyside where he married Margaret Mary Gracey and they had two British-born children, Gerry Blattner (born 1913 in Liverpool), and Betty Blattner (born in 1914 in Cheshire). They both followed their father into the film business, Gerry as a producer and Betty as a makeup artist. Ludwig Blattner never became a British citizen, and during the First World War he remained in an internment camp, which interrupted his management of the Gaiety cinema in Wallasey. The hearsay based suggestion in a letter by Jay Leyda in 1968 that he married Else (also known as Elisabeth), the widow of Edmund Meisel the composer of the score for Battleship Potemkin, some time after Meisel's death in 1930, is without any hard evidence. Indeed, he was resident with his wife Margaret Mary at the Country Club in Elstree when he took his own life in 1935.

Ludwig hanged himself at the Elstree Country Club in October 1935, when his son was 22 and his daughter was 21. Ludwig and Gerry were honoured by the naming of Blattner Close in Elstree in the mid-1990s.
