= The Edge of the World =

- DVD cover
- Directed by: Michael Powell
- Written by: Michael Powell
- Produced by: Joe Rock
- Starring: John Laurie; Belle Chrystall; Eric Berry; Finlay Currie; Niall MacGinnis
- Cinematography: Monty Berman; Skeets Kelly; Ernest Palmer
- Edited by: Derek N. Twist
- Music by: Lambert Williamson (uncredited)
- Production company: Joe Rock Productions
- Distributed by: British Independent Exhibitors
- Release date: 6 July 1937 (UK)
- Running time: 81 minutes
- Country: United Kingdom
- Language: English
- Budget: over £30,000 (est.)

The Edge of the World is a 1937 British film directed by Michael Powell, loosely based on the evacuation of the Scottish archipelago of St Kilda. It was Powell's first major project. The title is a reference to the expression ultima Thule, coined by Virgil (Georgics 1:30).

The film is the story of the depopulation of one of the isolated outer islands of Scotland as, one by one, the younger generation leaves for the greater opportunities offered by the mainland, making it harder to follow the old ways of life there.

== Plot ==
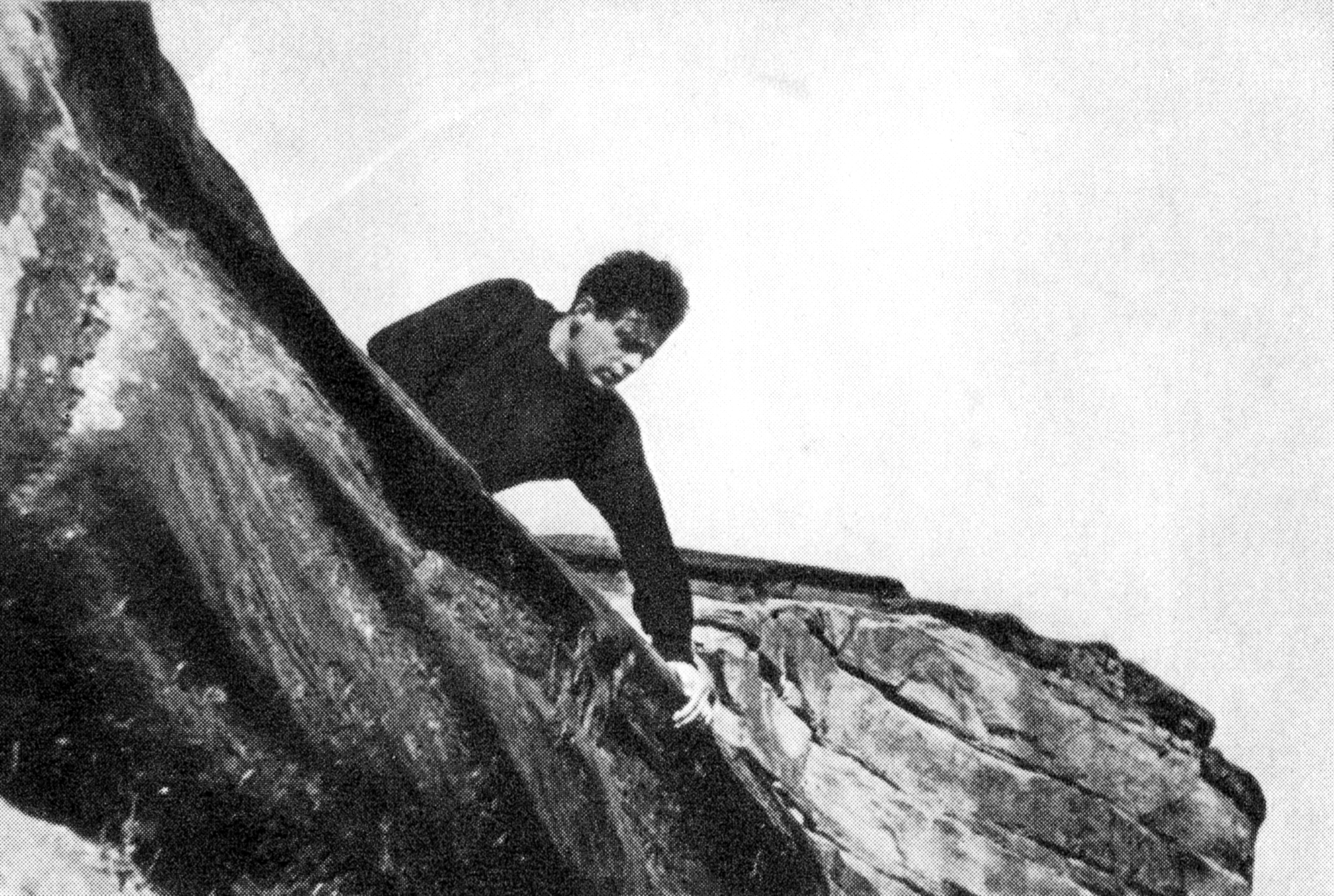
Niall MacGinnis in The Edge of the World

The film begins with a yacht passing by the remote island of Hirta (see note in "Production" below). The yachtsman (played by the director, Michael Powell) finds it strange that the island looks deserted, when a book he carries mentions that it should be inhabited. His crewman Andrew Gray (Niall MacGinnis) tells him that his book is outdated and the island is indeed uninhabited now. Andrew tries to dissuade the yachtsman from landing, but he decides to do so anyway. After landing, they find a gravestone on the edge of a cliff, and Andrew, who turns out to be a former islander on Hirta, starts to reminisce. The remainder of the film is his flashback. Andrew's friend Robbie Manson (Eric Berry) wants to leave the island and explore the wider world. Robbie's sister, Ruth Manson (Belle Chrystall), is Andrew's sweetheart, and the young couple are quite willing to stay. Robbie tells Ruth and Andrew that he is engaged to a Norwegian girl called Polly, whom he had met in a brief period working outside Hirta, and intends to announce that to the other islanders on the next day at the men's assembly, the "parliament". Robbie's father, Peter Manson (John Laurie), is determined to stay, while Andrew's father, James Gray (Finlay Currie), suspects that their way of life cannot last much longer.

But if Robbie leaves, that will make it harder for the others because there will be one less young man to help with the fishing and the crofting. Moreover, Robbie not only intends to leave but also to propose that the other islanders do the same and evacuate Hirta. Andrew opposes that and, given the divided opinions and lack of consensus in the "parliament", they decide to settle the issue with a race up a dangerous cliff without safety ropes. Andrew wins the race and Robbie falls off the cliff to his death. Ridden with guilt and shunned by Ruth's father, who will now not give permission for their marriage, Andrew decides to leave the island for Lerwick on the Shetland Mainland.

Unbeknownst to Andrew, Ruth is pregnant with his child. She gives birth to a girl months after he leaves and, since the mail boat only comes once a year, Andrew cannot be told of the news. The islanders send off drift wood caskets with letters to Andrew. Luckily, one of them is caught by the captain of a fishing trawler on which Andrew is about to be employed as a crewman. Andrew arrives on Hirta on the trawler amid a fierce gale, just in time to take Ruth and his newborn daughter to the mainland, as the baby is dying from diphtheria and needs a life-saving tracheotomy. They succeed in saving the girl's life and Andrew decides that since Ruth and the baby are now safe, they are not going back to Hirta.

The near death of Ruth's baby, plus the fact that the island's crops are failing, and peat is almost depleted and will only last to provide fuel for one more winter, are the final straws, and the islanders decide to evacuate to the mainland. Peter Manson reluctantly signs the petition for the government to assist in their evacuation and resettlement. As the island is being evacuated, Peter decides to go after a guillemot's egg, for which a collector had promised to pay five pounds. The egg can be found in a nest on a steep cliff, which Peter climbs down tied to a rope. As he is climbing back up, the rope frays and Peter falls to his death. His gravestone is placed on the edge of the cliff and it was the one found by the yachtsman in the initial scenes.

== Production ==
Powell had been making studio based 'quota quickies' for some years but wanted to make a film about the depopulation of the Scottish islands ever since seeing a newspaper article about the evacuation of St Kilda some years before.

He was not allowed to film on St Kilda, but found another suitable island in Foula in the Shetland Islands to the north of Scotland.

The island depicted in the film is referred to as "Hirta", which is the actual name of the formerly inhabited main island of the St Kilda archipelago, but a map that appears two minutes into the film actually shows Foula (even the name of the real-life settlement of Ham on Foula can be read), the introduction text mentions that the Romans "saw from the Orkneys a distant island", which is more consistent with the location of Foula, and in the "parliament" scene Robbie mentions the previous evacuation of St Kilda. Moreover, St Kildans spoke Scottish Gaelic, whereas the film's characters speak in English with western Scottish accents

Powell gathered together a cast and crew who were willing to take part in an expedition to what, before the air service that now exists, was a very isolated part of the UK. They had to stay there for quite a few months and finished up with a film which not only told the story he wanted but also captured the raw natural beauty of the location.

== Critical reception ==
Reviewing the film at the time of its release in the United States, Variety commented that it was "overlong" but their review was largely positive. They wrote, "Chief credit is due to the photography, which depicts the grim, eerie storm-bound islet in its ever varying moods. Young stars are virile and sincere, and John Laurie and Finlay Currie score as the respective fathers. Considerably reduced, it would make an excellent nature study."

== Literature ==
200,000 Feet on Foula (Edge of the World)
- Author: Michael Powell
- Language: English
- Genre: Nonfiction
- Publisher: Faber & Faber
- Publication date: 1938, 1990
- Publication place: United Kingdom
- Media type: Print
- ISBN: 0-571-15306-2

Powell wrote a book about his experience making the film: raising the initial funding, trying and failing to make the film on St Kilda, then realising that Foula could be used instead. He detailed how the cast and crew were selected and how they lived and worked on the island at a time when there were no flights there, only occasional radio communication. They even had to build their own accommodation.

The book was initially titled 200,000 Feet on Foula. This is a reference to the amount of film used, not the height of the cliffs. It was published in America as 200,000 Feet – The Edge of the World and was reprinted as Edge of the World: The making of a film in a paperback edition in 1990.

== Return to the Edge of the World ==
In 1978, director Michael Powell and some of the surviving cast and crew went back to Foula to re-visit the island where they had made the film that changed their lives. This was made for BBC TV to act as "colour bookends" to the 1937 film and is called Return to the Edge of the World. In the first part, Powell drives in to Pinewood Studios and tells how the film came to be made. Then he, John Laurie, Sydney Streeter, Grant Sutherland and others return to Foula. In the second part, they talk to some of the islanders who were there in 1937 and remember those who couldn't make the reunion. Return to the Edge of the World was available as an extra on both the VHS and DVD releases of the original film by the BFI. Following the death of Belle Chrystall in 2003, there are no surviving members of the credited cast or crew. Andy Gear, who at age three lived on Foula and was featured as a "Villager in Evacuation" lives in Gutcher, North Yell island, Shetland.

== See also ==
- St Kilda, Britain's Loneliest Isle (1928)
