= Women in comedy =

The phrase "Women in comedy" refers both to women who participate in the creation of comedic works as well as the social experience of women within the industry. While primarily dominated by men throughout history, the field of comedy has represented women since at least the mid-1700s. Some of these first figures to enter the field, however, were faced with resistance and discrimination. A sense of humor in women was previously thought to have meant the ability to laugh at a man's joke, rather than to tell the joke herself.

Early acts were often based on the standard roles of women as housewives and mothers. Comedy was tailored to what men would find to be both funny and non-threatening. As women gained slow acceptance of their presence in comedy, they were able to expand the topics that they covered. Since then, women have made significant gains in the field, having found fame through stand-up, television, movies, and writing. Women such as Phyllis Diller, Wanda Sykes, Gina Barreca and many others have contributed to the world of comedy, spanning both time and medium. Despite this discrimination, many women comedians managed to thrive in the field. One such comedian was Lucille Ball. In TIME magazine's 1952 cover story on Ball, she was highly regarded. Despite the highly gendered industry that Ball had to break into and the stereotypically acceptable roles which she portrayed, coverage of her show I Love Lucy indicates media coverage that was less preoccupied with her gender than what today's women comedians face. Another groundbreaking woman comedian who faced discrimination was Phyllis Diller, famous for disguising herself as a man named Phillip Downey and breaking into the Friars Club in October 1983. The Friars Club was a private comedy club in New York City which did not at the time admit women as members nor as audience members. In comedy of the 20th century, the women that were able to become successful comedians often were isolated.

As comedic license has grown, comedy has become a tool within the scope of feminism. By reclaiming a previously male-exclusive art form, feminist comedians are able to use the traditionally-male art of comedy to critique what they view as patriarchal structures. Today, feminist comedy draws attention to female issues such as menstruation, rape, gender inequality, beauty norms, and machismo. As a readily acceptable and understandable medium of communication, comedy lends itself to the feminist movement, allowing women's issues to be more widespread in general society.

== History ==
=== Western History ===
==== Ancient Greece ====
One of the earliest known origin points of comedy is ancient Greek theatre. Women were regularly portrayed on the Athenian stage. Lysistrata is a comedy by Aristophanes originally appearing on stage in 411 BCE. It is the story of a woman's — Lysistrata's — attempt to end the Peloponnesian war by denying sex to men on both sides.

Female characters were typically portrayed by male actors. However, women were not entirely absent from ancient Greek theater. Women were among the audience and in some cases took the stage themselves.

Early 20th Century

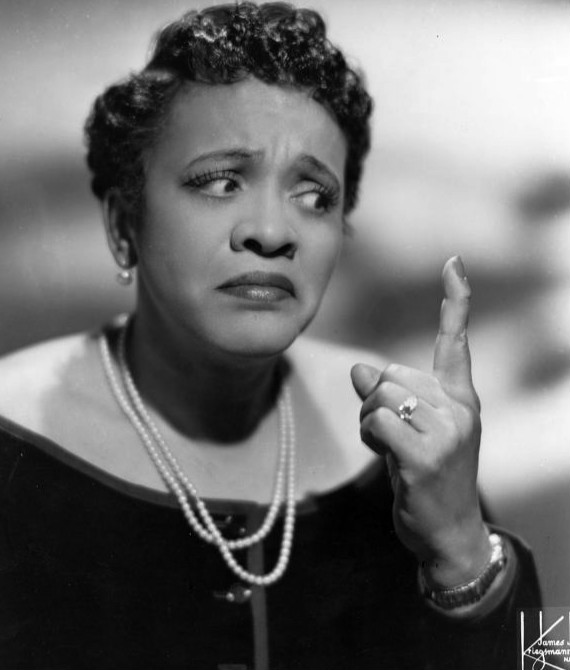
Moms Mabley, 1944

Moms Mabley was one of the first openly gay comedians. By the 1920s, she was among the most prominent black vaudeville performers, dominating the Chittlin' Circuit. In 1939, she became the first woman to perform stand-up at the Apollo Theater in Harlem.

==== Mid-20th Century ====
The 1950s saw a proliferation of American women with prominent careers in comedy:

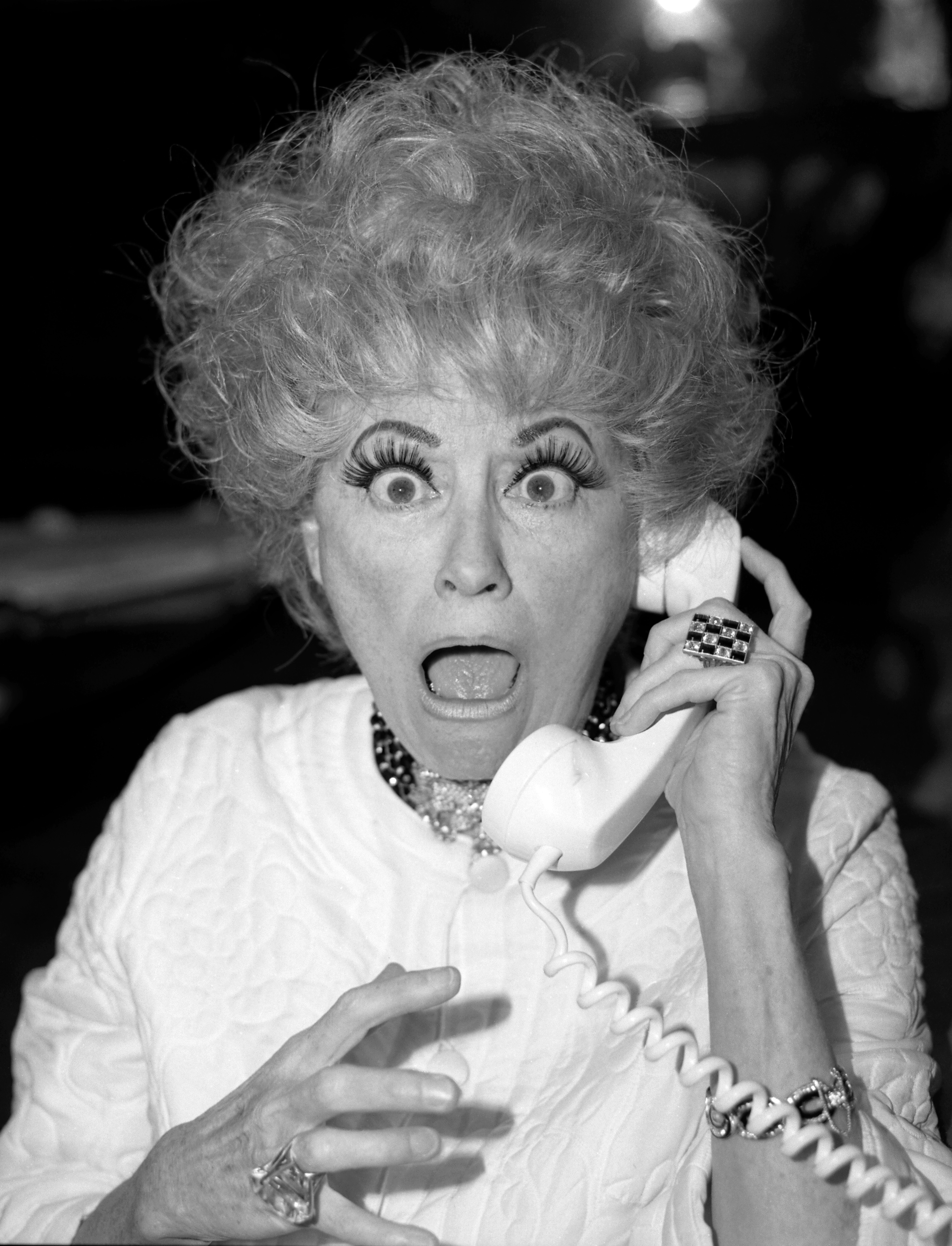
Phyllis Diller, 1973

Phyllis Diller made her comedic debut at the Purple Onion Comedy Club in the 1950s. Her stand-up routines focused on the problems of the suburban housewife, a previous unaddressed area by male comics. By incorporating self-deprecation into her routines, Diller was able to enter comedy in a time when funny and attractive women were seen as threatening. However, by confining her comedy to her inability to fulfill her traditional role, she reinforced female stereotypes rather than dismissing them.

After an early career acting on Broadway and in films, Lucille Ball became a well-known comedy actor on television, starting with the hit situation comedy "I Love Lucy", which she created in 1951, with her then-husband Desi Arnaz. She continued to act in other roles in television, film, and on stage later on. In 1962, she became the first woman to run a major television studio, Desilu Productions, which produced many popular television series, including Mission: Impossible and Star Trek.

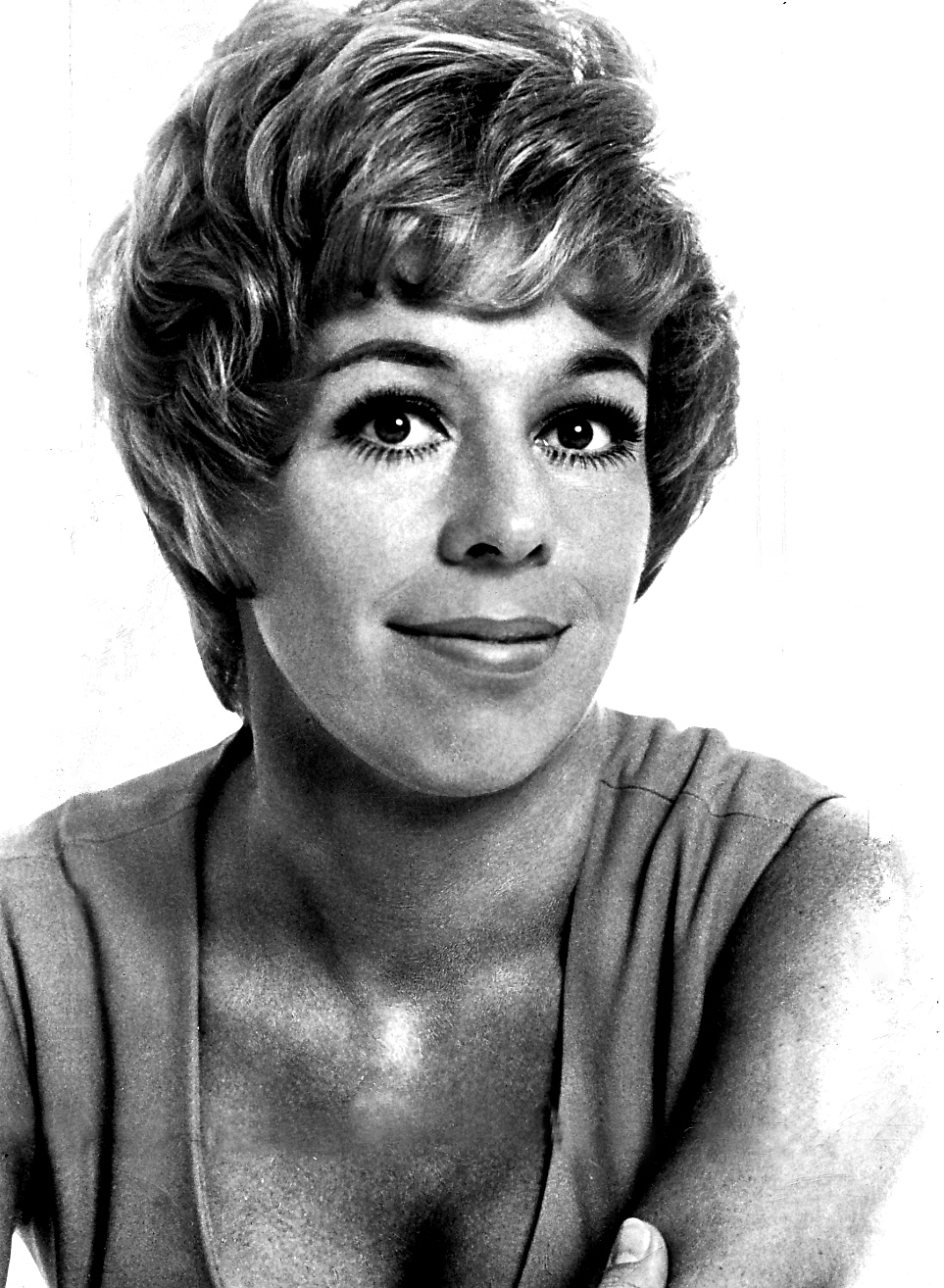
Carol Burnett, 1974

Carol Burnett started performing on stage in comedy roles in the early 1950s, while still in college. She went on to perform in numerous productions in theater, in films, and on television. By 1967, she began hosting her own television variety show, The Carol Burnett Show, one of the first of its kind to be hosted by a woman. The show continued in production for over a decade, breaking new ground in comedic material, gaining top ratings, and earning numerous awards.

Joan Rivers (active from 1959 to 2014) was one of the first female comedians to utilize the "talk/conversational" method, one that was suited to television talk shows. Unlike Phyllis Diller, who was quite unlike her comedic personality, the comedy of Joan Rivers more closely reflected her personality. She often drew on her own personal experiences as a self-proclaimed Jewish princess. Unlike her predecessors, Rivers did not downplay her attractiveness, but rather incorporated it into her riffs on life as a single woman. Still, her comedy was focused on the traditional problems of a woman (trying to find a boyfriend and husband, being a good wife etc.).

==== Late 20th Century ====
The 1970s was dominated by second-wave feminism, as reflected by the women performing comedy at the time:

Jane Curtin was a part of the inaugural class of Not Ready for Prime Time Players on Saturday Night Live in 1975. On SNL, she was the anchor for Weekend Update and started in many well known skits including Coneheads. On Weekend Update, she served as the liberal counterpart to Dan Aykroyd's conservative perspective. In 2008, when asked about the environment at Saturday Night Live, Curtin said that female writers faced an extremely difficult battle, especially when cast member like John Belushi were actively working against them. While fundamentally believing that women are not capable of humor, he also would sabotage pieces written by women. Despite this atmosphere, Jane Curtin had a very successful career at SNL and went on to work on sitcoms, Broadway, and various movies.

Elayne Boosler broke ground by adopting an observational style that included frank discussions about her life as a single woman, as well as political commentary. Her performance style set her apart from the more self-deprecating humor of female stand-up predecessors such as Joan Rivers and Phyllis Diller, whose jokes often revolved around being a wife and mother. Her 1985, self-produced comedy special Party of One was the first hour-long comedy special by a female comedian to appear on a cable television network. Boosler had originally approached Showtime for funding, but wound-up funding the project herself after TV executives told her that no one would watch a woman do an hour of comedy.

==== 21st Century ====
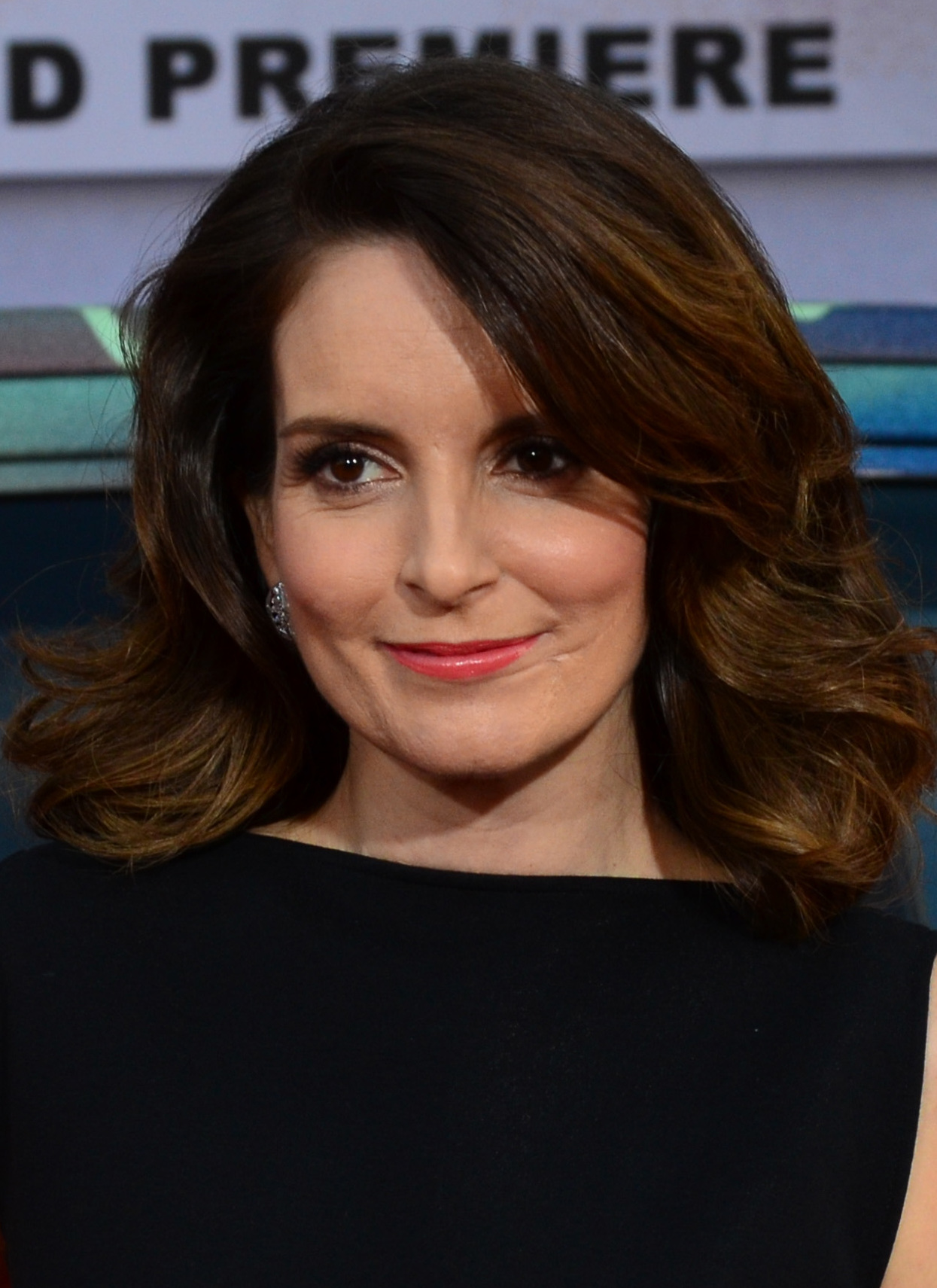
Tina Fey, 2014

Figures such as Tina Fey have paved the way in the modern era for large-scale growth in female comedy. Her public appointment as the first female head writer of Saturday Night Live placed her in a position to serve as a feminist comedy icon. Many of her sketches became iconic, particularly her satirical portrayal of vice presidential candidate Sarah Palin. Her comedic writing (Mean Girls, 30 Rock, Bossypants, Baby Mama, Date Night etc...), in addition to achieving great public notice, was well received by critics.

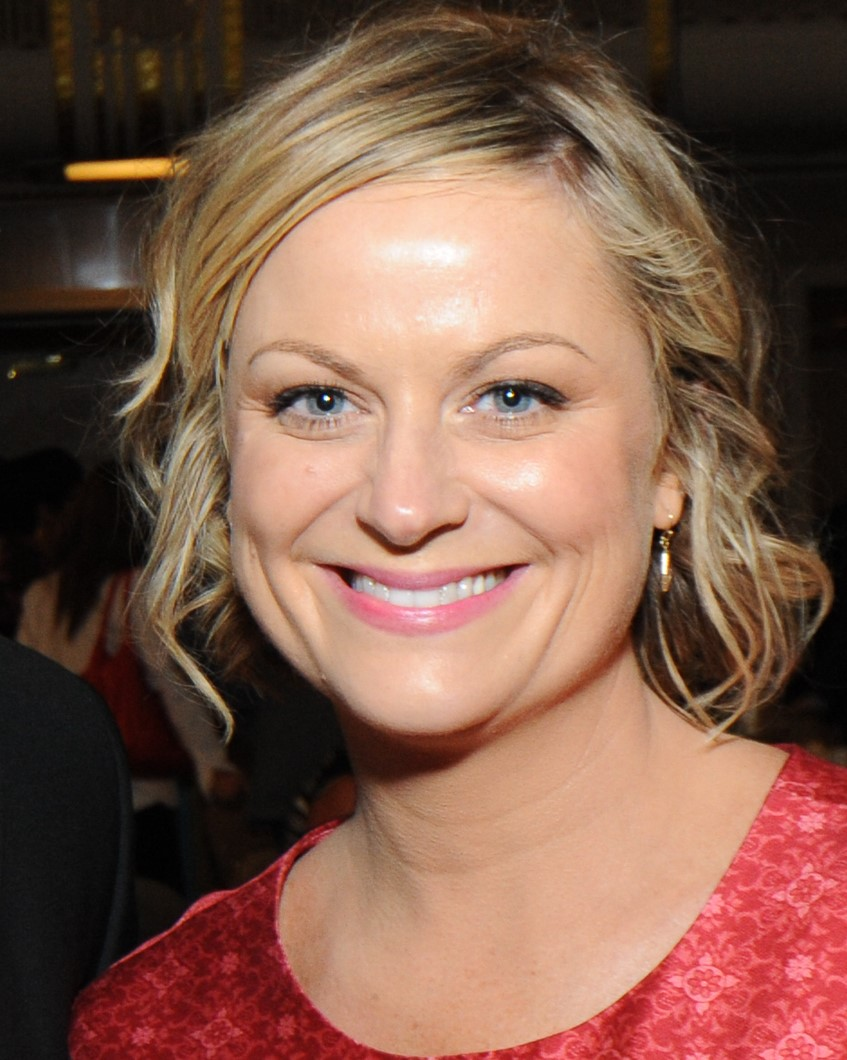
Amy Poehler, 2013

Amy Poehler is an actress, producer, writer, and comedian known for her notable TV appearances including her role starring as Leslie Knope on Parks and Recreation and her time as a regularly featured performer on Saturday Night Live. Amy first became involved with sketch comedy as a member of My Mother's Flea Bag comedy group at Boston College. She is the only female founding member of the Upright Citizens Brigade, a comedy institution and training center which has produced a number of prominent comedians, including Ed Helms, Aziz Ansari, Nick Kroll, Donald Glover, Aubrey Plaza, and Kate McKinnon. Poehler is highly decorated within the comedy world. In 2011, she received Variety Magazine's Power of Comedy Award and in 2015, Poehler was honored with a star on the Hollywood Walk of Fame. (For a full list of Poehler's awards, see List of awards and nominations received by Amy Poehler.)

Amy Schumer was the highest paid entertainer in her field in 2016. She has been one of the most successful female comedians of all time, appealing to a wide audience of both men and women. Schumer is most well known for her movie Trainwreck (2015) and her Comedy Central show, Inside Amy Schumer. In 2015, she was named one of Time Magazine's most influential people. Her comedy is often focused on gender politics, touching on the issues that women face throughout their lives.

Miranda Hart is a female comedian from the UK. She is most well known for her television series Miranda. Her awkward and clumsy character in the show is an embodiment of all the society neuroses that women face in daily life. Such a style of comedy makes her into an everywoman. Hart herself sees a divide in comedy, with some using comedy as a tool to increase their coolness (others) and some using comedy as a tool for clowning around (her). By staying within the clowning realm of comedy, she achieved a cult following.

=== Asian History ===
==== Bangladesh ====
Outside of the United States, women have been having similar experiences in their attempts to enter field of comedy, colored by their own cultural influences. One such women is Farhana Muna, a Bangladeshi Muslim comic. Her material is focused on Bangladeshi life and culture, from parties to relatives commenting on weight loss. According to Muna, she often feels constrained by what is deemed appropriate or not for a Bangladeshi Muslim women. She must watch what she says and wears. Muna reemphasized the sentiment that there is a wider range of comedy acceptable for men. She has also faced criticism for her actions, including her choice to not wear the hijab, with people calling her a bad Muslim. However, she continues her comedic work due to the community of women that she has met through it. Muna sees comedy as a collective platform of expression, a way to share her experiences in a relatable way.

==== India ====
Women have been on the rise in India's stand-up comedy scene as recently as 2016. These female comedians face a great deal of cultural animosity. Despite this discrimination, women such as Aditi Mittal and Neeti Palta have found success in an industry in which many women struggled to gain recognition.

==== South Korea ====
In South Korea, the majority of television programs feature a cast of hosts composed exclusively of men. Many of these shows only invite male guests. Only two television programs are hosted by women. On shows without hosts, celebrities are paired up for virtual marriage, or group dating. South Korean TV shows only offer gender balance when women are in gendered roles. Producers see men as more advantageous hires as the shows' audiences are majority women. Additionally, there was a worry that audiences would react badly to strong women in television. As the 4B movement grows in South Korea, so too do the opportunities for women. Rather than featuring beautiful women as prizes to be won by males contestants, new shows such as Sisters' Slam Dunk (which premiered in 2016) feature women working together to solve problems.

== Comedic forms ==
=== Stand-up ===
Stand-up comedy is a form of comedy in which performers act in front of a live audience, creating an interactive dependency. Jokes range from short one-liners to longer monologues. Despite their lower numbers, women have not been absent in stand-up comedy. Some notable women in stand-up include Sophie Tucker and Belle Barth, both Jewish singers and comics from the 20th century known for their bawdy and suggestive subject matter that is echoed in today's stand-up sets.

=== Sketch Comedy ===
Sketch Comedy is a form of comedy consisting of short scenes or vignettes performed by a group of comedians. Some popular examples include television shows like Saturday Night Live, the most Emmy winning show of all time, and internet-based comedy companies like College Humor and Smosh. Such shows typically feature a mixed gender cast of comedians. For example, three of the seven original 1975 cast members of Saturday Night Live were women. As of April 2026, the current cast of eighteen comedians only contains five women.

The Carol Burnett Show was a variety show hosted by Carol Burnett which ran from 1967 to 1978 on CBS. The program featured songs and skits by Burnett as well as her comedy troupe and their guests. Aside from The Ernie Flatt Dancers, only two cast members are credited as being in all 279 episodes; Carol Burnett and Vicki Lawrence.

=== Late night television ===
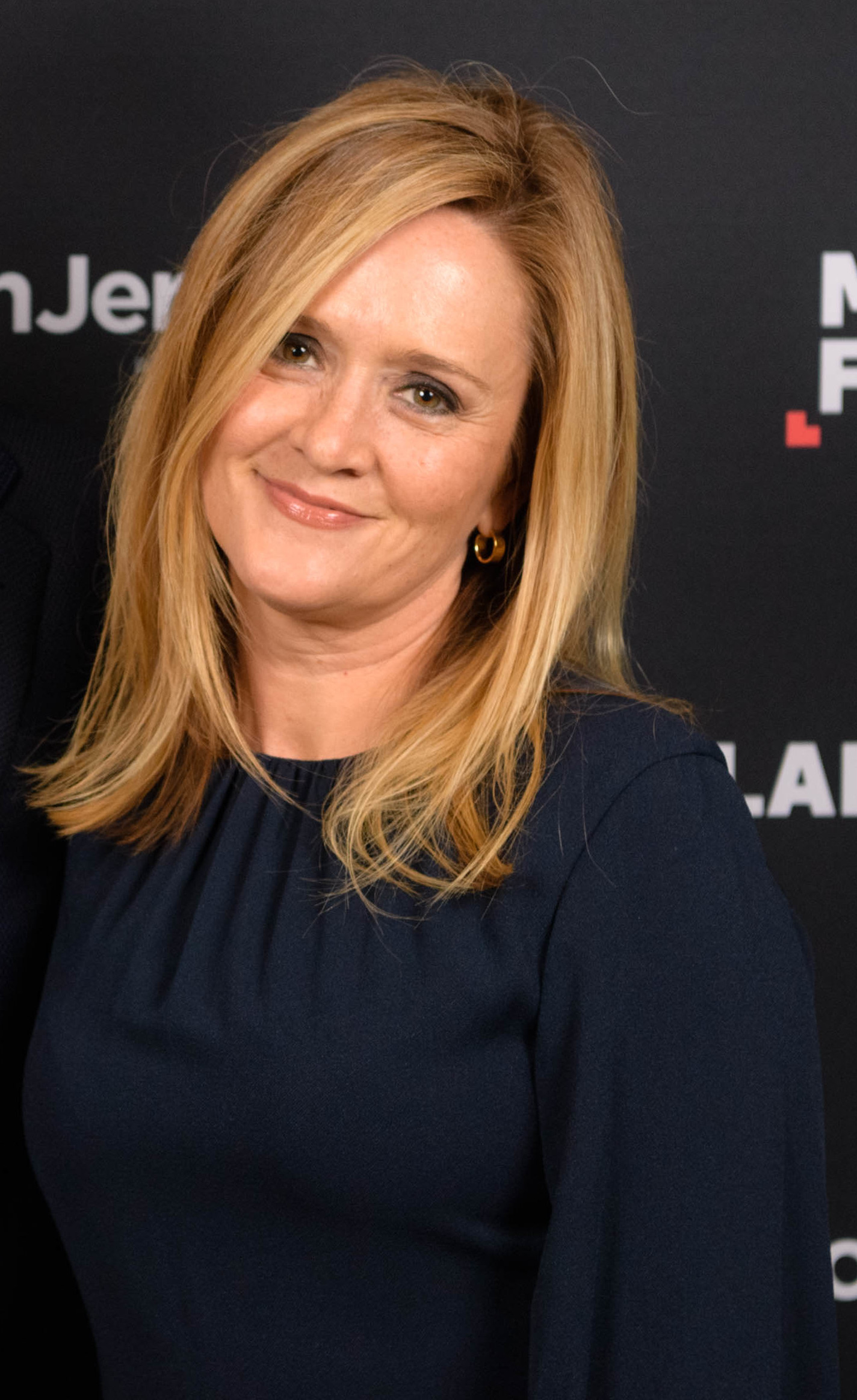
Samantha Bee, 2017

The first late-night talk show was The Faye Emerson Show, hosted by film and stage actress Faye Emerson in 1949.

Whoopi Goldberg launched The Whoopi Goldberg Show in 1992. In 2007, she became co-host of American day-time talk show The View, a program hosted exclusively by women.

In 2009, comedian Wanda Sykes became the host of a late-night talk show, The Wanda Sykes Show. The show began with a monologue before Sykes joined a panel of guests with whom she discussed topics ranging from news and politics to sports and pop culture.

Full Frontal with Samantha Bee premiered in 2016, hosted by comedian Samantha Bee, a former correspondent on The Daily Show. The show received multiple accolades, including a Television Critics Association Award, an Emmy, Academy of Television Arts & Sciences award and an GLAAD Media Award.

Amanpour & Company hosted by Christiane Amanpour is a late-night global-affairs interview television program that premiered on PBS in 2018 as an expanded version of the CNN International show Amanpour.

=== Film ===
Film in general, as well as comedic film, continues to show the gender imbalance of other forms of comedy. In 2014, a study found that there were 2.24 male characters for every female character. Of the movies surveyed, 30.9% of the speaking characters were female. Additionally, one of the major storylines in the film industry, the romantic comedy, consistently follows traditional female roles, women to searching for a male partner.

Despite this, film all the way back to the silent film era has featured prominent women comedians. Some significant examples of women in film from the Silent Film era include Gale Henry, Louise Fazenda, Colleen Moore, and Constance Talmadge. Representation of women comedians in film continued into the early sound era with female comedy teams like Anita Garvin and Marian Byron, famous for comedy short A Pair of Tights, which gave rise to a trend of female comedy duos. Another notable woman of the silent and early sound eras was actress, editor, writer, and comedian Marie Dressler. In 1914, she played Tillie in Tillie's Punctured Romance, the first full-length screen comedy.

=== Social media ===
Most American women in comedy use social media to produce comedy content, engage with fans, and influence their press coverage. Comedians include YouTubers and influencers, such as Colleen Ballinger, also known as the fictional character, Miranda Sings. Ballinger was the most followed female comedic YouTuber in 2022, with 21.5m TikTok followers compared to 23.2m subscribers on YouTube. A study in 2023 found that 92% use Instagram, 89% use Twitter, only 48% run a YouTube account, and 58% of women comedians host at least one podcast. While only 46% of women comedians make content for TikTok, the platform provided half the total digital media following for some of the most popular women comedians.

== Gender imbalance ==
The gender imbalance between men and women can be found all over, even on Wikipedia. The page: list of comedians shows a much higher number of males than females.

=== In pay ===
In the United States, there is a large gender gap between men and women in comedy with regards to both pay and number. In 2014, all ten of the top ten paid comedians were male, bringing in a total of $173 million. In 2016, one female entered the list: Amy Schumer, at number two.

=== In appearances ===
A study in 2017 found a large gender imbalance in UK comedic panel shows, with 31% of the appearances. However, the same study also found marked improvement since 1989, when the statistic was 3%. Additionally, the UK industry website Chortle lists 269 female comedian as compared to 1,279 male comedians.

Imbalance can also be seen at the level of the comedy club. For example, the prestigious New York comedy club Carolines featured 20% female performers to 80% male in 2014. Within the writers room, gender imbalance persists. Women made up 10 percent of writers working on the top 250 domestic grossing films of 2010 and 15 percent of writers and 18 percent of creators in prime-time television during the 2010–2011 season.

In South Korea, of 70 comedic variety shows, 13 had all male hosts and guests, and 23 with all male hosts, meaning that more than half of these shows lack female hosts. Only two shows had all females hosts and guests. Shows without hosts often try to model marriages by pairing up male and female celebrities. While this does achieve some sense of gender balance, it uses very traditional roles.

== Gendering of humor ==
The early female figures in stand-up, such as Phyllis Diller, were able to enter the mainstream through their willingness to self-deprecate and declare themselves ugly. Other early female comedians, such as Mae West and Helen Kane, used sex appeal to attract male audiences. In other words, they were able to enter, but not on the terms of male comedians. More modern female comedians cite a need to tailor their comedy to what men would find to be funny, with change in this mentality only coming very recently.

=== In stand-up ===
Stand-up comedy, in particular, is described as a masculine art form. The comedic form requires a takeover of the stage in order for the comedian's material to "kill." The words that are used to describe success are often violent, such as killed or annihilated. (For more examples of how stand-up jargon can reference violence, see the "Terms" section of Stand-up Comedy.) For women, direct contact with the audience puts their womanhood on display. Many female comedians choose to wear loose-fitting clothing to take their femininity out of the spotlight. Some theorists suggest that the performer must take charge of the stage, claiming it as their own via the phallic symbol of the microphone. Stand-up forms of comedy are often credited as more aggressive than other comedy forms with jokes often centered on an attack on another party. The aggression that such an art form necessitates is encouraged in males but discouraged in females. One significant female stand-up comedian Belle Barth was arrested and fined on lewdness charges in 1953 and was eventually banned from radio and television.

As well, an experimental study published through Psychology of Aesthetics, Creativity & The Arts scientifically investigated the effect of sexist stand-up comedy clips on women's mental health and cognitive performance. The study compared the scores on cognitive tasks of women who had been shown clips from sexist stand-up comedy to those that had been shown non-sexist comedy. According to the study, women who watched sexist stand-up comedy showed a significant negative overall impact on the cognitive wellbeing.

=== Discrimination against women ===
In many societies around the world, a woman's role has affected her flexibility in comedy. In countries that historically view women as inferior to men, comedy is seen as a masculine discipline. The common perception that women aren't funny pervades all aspects of comedy, including stand-up, television, and movies. The comedy establishment, influenced by patriarchal society, has relegated women to the "side of tears and loss." Systematic sexism can be found at the level of audience members, bookers, agents, and male comics. As a powerful social tool, comedy brings women outside of the traditional role that has been defined as theirs.

Women have experienced everything from heckling audience members calling them gendered terms like bitches or sluts, to being invited to fake comedic festivals (so the organizer could have sex with the female comedian), to being introduced in roasts as the girl that "slept with one of the judges."

== Feminist tool ==
Humor has been used as a tool of feminism both for its ability to point out patriarchy and the structures it creates as well as identify the common female experience. A distinction must be made between female humor and feminist humor. Female humor is self-deprecatory, turning inwards to the performer herself. Feminist humor, by contrast, looks outwards at the societal structures that demean women. It is aggressive and pointed, using comedic language formerly reserved for men only as a tool of liberation. Feminist humor is to be an agent of change for women by drawing attention to their lowered position in society.

An example of such comedy was duo act Robin Tyler and Pat Harrison who initially billed themselves as sisters but later credited their success in coming out as lovers and made feminism a strong theme in their comedy. In 1972, Tyler and Harrison released the first explicitly feminist comedy album, Try It—You'll Like It.

University Professor Emerita at Old Dominion University Janet Bing argues that for feminist humor to be most effective at its goal of change, it should be inclusive, rather than divisive. Divisive humor, or jokes that focus on male structures or male-bashing, do not advance feminism, but rather continue to marginalize females. Inclusive humor that riffs off of the shared experience of women can be subversive without the negative effects of divisive humor. Bing continues to say that when humor falls into this inclusive comedy it contributes to feminism by first, contradicting the age old stereotype that women cannot be funny, and second, by undermining the status quo. Backing the call for inclusivity in feminist comedy are Meg Tully and Michelle Colpean who argue against the "White Feminist Comedy" of popular comedians like Amy Schumer and Tina Fey whom they claim use their feminist comedy to mask and dismiss their racism.

Humor itself can be used to make strong structural changes in society. Many times humor has been used to subvert hierarchical structures. For example, the Guerrilla Girls used humor to point out the patriarchal, unchanging nature of the Tony awards, which give the majority of their prizes to men. It also functions to establish an in-group (those making and understanding the joke) and an out-group (those on the receiving end). Through this process, humor can create solidarity within a group, but can also make another feel excluded. For women, this can serve to strengthen them as a community.

== See also ==
- Comedy
- Feminism
- Women in film
- Stand-up comedy
- Theories of humor
