= Raggedy Rose =

1926 film

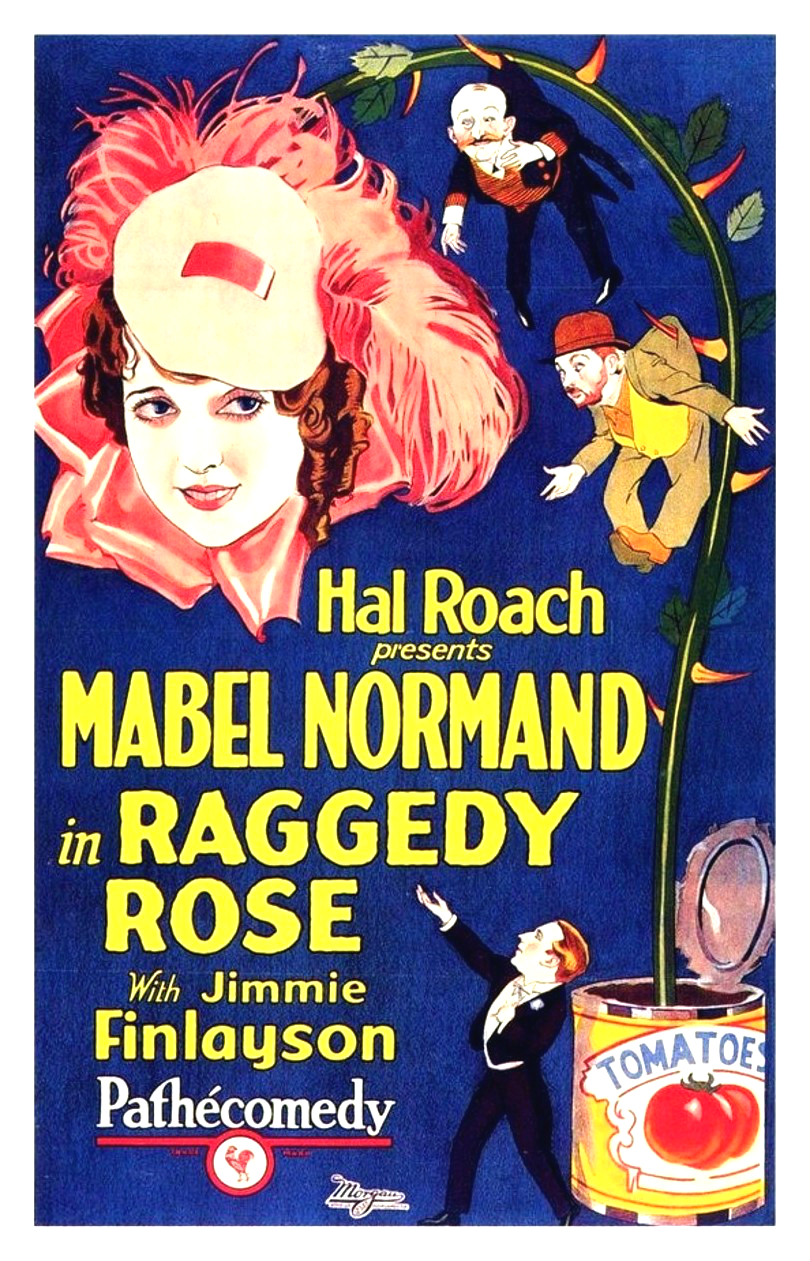
- Theatrical release poster
- Directed by: Richard Wallace; F. Richard Jones (supervising director); Stan Laurel (asst. director)
- Written by: Carl Harbaugh; Stan Laurel; Leroy Scott; Jerome Storm; Beatrice Van; Hal Yates; H. M. Walker (titles)
- Produced by: Hal Roach
- Starring: Mabel Normand
- Cinematography: Harry W. Gerstad; Floyd Jackman
- Edited by: Richard C. Currier
- Production company: Hal Roach Studios
- Distributed by: Pathé Exchange
- Release date: November 7, 1926 (United States)
- Running time: 56 minutes
- Country: United States
- Language: Silent (English intertitles)

The full film

Raggedy Rose is a 1926 American silent comedy film starring Mabel Normand. The film was co-written by Stan Laurel, and directed by Richard Wallace.

== Cast ==
- Mabel Normand as Raggedy Rose
- Carl Miller as Ted Tudor
- Max Davidson as Moe Ginsberg
- James Finlayson as Simpson Sniffle
- Anita Garvin as Janice
- Laura La Varnie as Janice's Mother
- Jerry Mandy as The Chauffeur
- Alta Allen as Rose's Former Co-Worker (uncredited)
- Tyler Brooke as Undetermined Role (uncredited)
- Sammy Brooks as Undetermined Role (uncredited)
- Theodore von Eltz as Undetermined Role (uncredited)

== Plot ==
Rose (Normand), who works for a junk dealer (Davidson), dreams of romance with bachelor Ted Tudor (Miller).

== Production notes ==
Oliver Hardy had been injured in a cooking accident at home where he burned his arm after a frying pan of scalding grease spilled onto it, and he was recovering when filming for Raggedy Rose began. This accident also forced Hardy to be replaced by Stan Laurel in the Hal Roach comedy Get 'Em Young.

== See also ==
- Stan Laurel filmography
