= Laurier Palace Theatre fire =

1927 cinema fire in Montreal, Quebec

Coordinates: 45°32′22″N 73°32′27″W

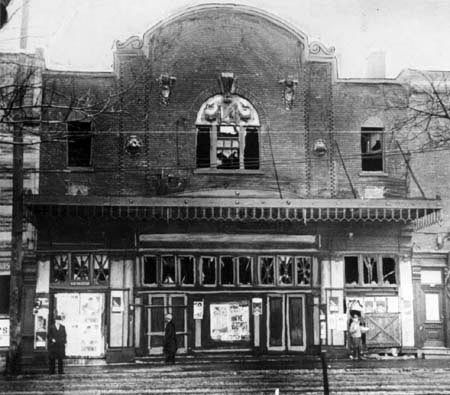
Theatre facade, after the fire, 1927

The Laurier Palace Theatre fire, sometimes known as the Saddest fire or the Laurier Palace Theatre crush, occurred in a movie theatre in Montreal, Canada, on January 9, 1927, killing 78 people. The theatre was located at 3215 Saint Catherine Street East, just east of Dézéry St.

== Fire ==
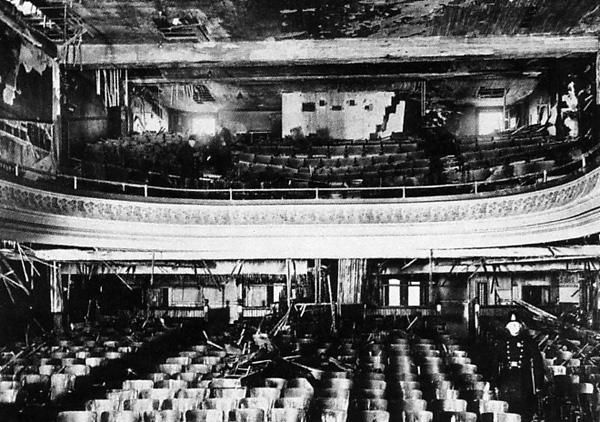
Theatre interior, January 10, 1927

The fire started in the early afternoon during a performance of the comedy Get 'Em Young. Approximately 250 children were in attendance, the majority of them not accompanied by an adult.

Survivors remembered the cry of fire and smoke quickly filling the air. Ushers, not realizing the danger, at first blocked the east balcony exit and urged the children to return to their seats. The exit doors opened inwards, meaning that the crush of those trying escape prevented them from being opened. The projectionist, Émile Massicotte, got thirty children away from the locked exit into the projection booth, then passed them out a window onto the marquee above the sidewalk, whence they descended fireman's ladders. One usher, Paul Champagne, helped direct evacuation at the other stairway that was not blocked; he and Massicotte were credited with preventing many more deaths, possibly well over 100.

A fire station was across the street and firemen arrived quickly.

== Victims ==
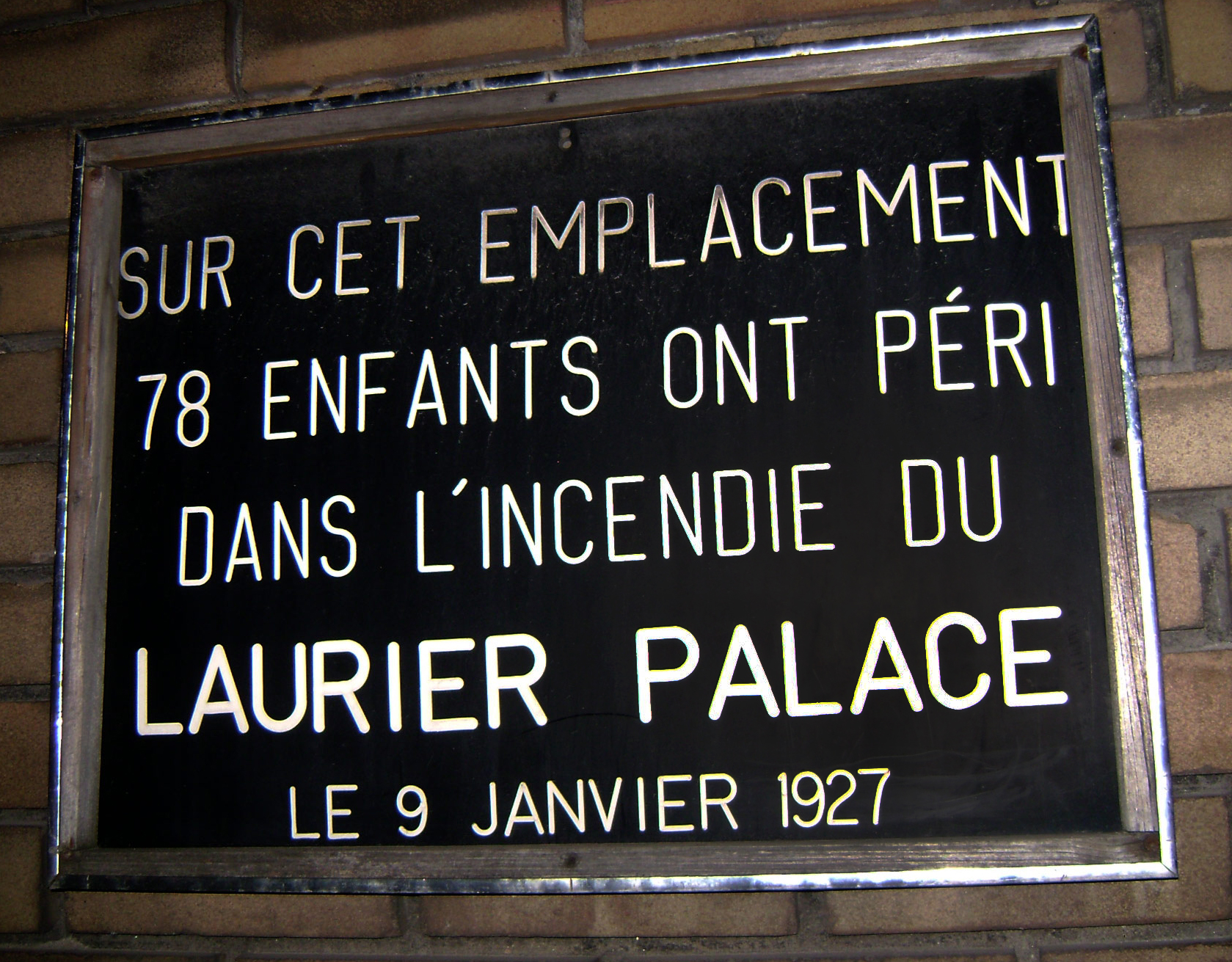
Plaque dedicated to the victims

Seventy-eight children died: 12 were crushed, 64 asphyxiated, and 2 children killed by the fire itself. Among the dead were the son of a firefighter and three children of a policeman who had been called to assist.

== Inquiry ==
There was never a released official cause for the fire, with Law and his employees claiming the children in the theater were lighting matches to see under the seats. Others believed that there was faulty wiring to blame. Highly flammable cellulose nitrate film was ruled out; according to Emile Massicotte's testimony at a subsequent inquiry, the fire never reached the projection booth.

== Aftermath ==
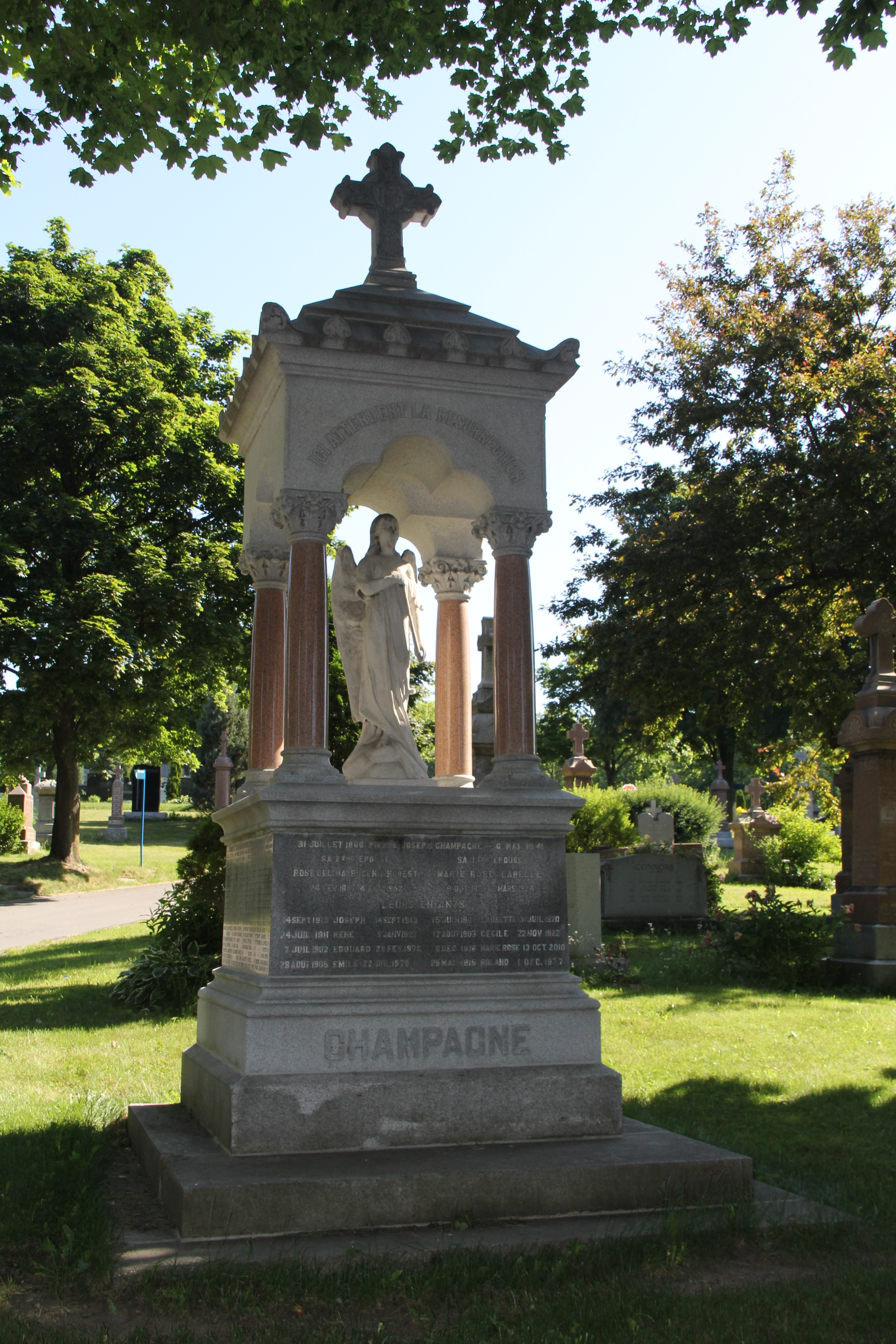
Memorial, Notre-Dame-des-Neiges Cemetery, Montreal

On January 11, funeral services were held in l'Église de la Nativité de la Sainte Vierge (the Church of the Nativity of the Blessed Virgin), near the theatre, for 39 of the victims. More than 50,000 watched the funeral procession. During the homily, Father Georges Gauthier, co-archbishop of Montréal, wondered whether entertainment should be allowed on Sundays and suggested that children be barred from cinemas.

=== Political ===
The people seized upon the tragedy of the Laurier Palace Theatre as an opportunity to block children's access to the cinema in general, claiming that the cinema "ruins the health of children, weakens their lungs, troubles their imagination, excites their nervous system, harms their education, overexcites their sinful ideas and leads to immorality".

A few months later Judge Louis Boyer recommended that everyone under 16 be forbidden access to cinema screenings. The following year, to appease extremists who wanted the cinema closed to all, such a law was passed and remained in effect for 33 years, until 1961. Building codes were also modified so that the doors of public buildings were required to open outwards.

In 1967, the cinema law was further modified, setting up a motion picture rating system that divided the movie-going population into age groups of 18 and over, 14 and over, and general (for all).

== Depiction in media ==
There are a large number of songs based around the fire with the singer Hercule Lavoie singing about the fire with the words:

«Il fallait des anges au paradis
Des chérubins aux blondes têtes
Et c’est pourquoi Dieu vous a pris
Votre bambin, votre fillette,
Consolez-vous, séchez vos pleurs
Ils sont heureux dans un monde meilleur
Il fallait des anges au paradis
C’est votre enfant que le Ciel a choisi.»

— "Il Fallait Des Anges Au Paradis", as sung by Hercule Lavoie, 1927

Which, in English, translates to:

"There was a need for angels in Heaven
Of blonde-haired cherubs
And that is why God has taken you
Your little boy, your little girl,
Take comfort, dry your eyes
They are happy in a better world
There was a need for angels in Heaven
It was your child that God chose."

== See also ==
- List of disasters in Canada
- Parents chrétiens sauvez vos enfants du cinéma meurtrier! (1927) A tract against children's attendance at cinemas written by R. P. Archambault, S. J..
