= When False Tongues Speak =

1917 film directed by Carl Harbaugh

- Directed by: Carl Harbaugh
- Written by: George Scarborough; Carl Harbaugh
- Produced by: William Fox
- Starring: Virginia Pearson; Hardee Kirkland; Claire Whitney
- Cinematography: Georges Benoit
- Production company: Fox Film
- Distributed by: Fox Film
- Release date: September 8, 1917
- Running time: 50 minutes
- Country: United States
- Languages: Silent; English intertitles

When False Tongues Speak is a 1917 American silent drama film directed by Carl Harbaugh and starring Virginia Pearson, Hardee Kirkland and Claire Whitney.

== Cast ==
- Virginia Pearson as Mary Page Walton
- Carl Harbaugh as Fred Walton
- Hardee Kirkland as Platt Sinclair
- Claire Whitney as Helen Lee
- William E. Meehan as Jimmy Hope
- Carl Eckstrom as Eric Mann

== Preservation ==
A complete print of When False Tongues Speak is extant at the Cinematheque Suisse in Lausanne.

== Bibliography ==
- Solomon, Aubrey. The Fox Film Corporation, 1915-1935: A History and Filmography. McFarland, 2011.
