= Starvation Blues =

1925 film

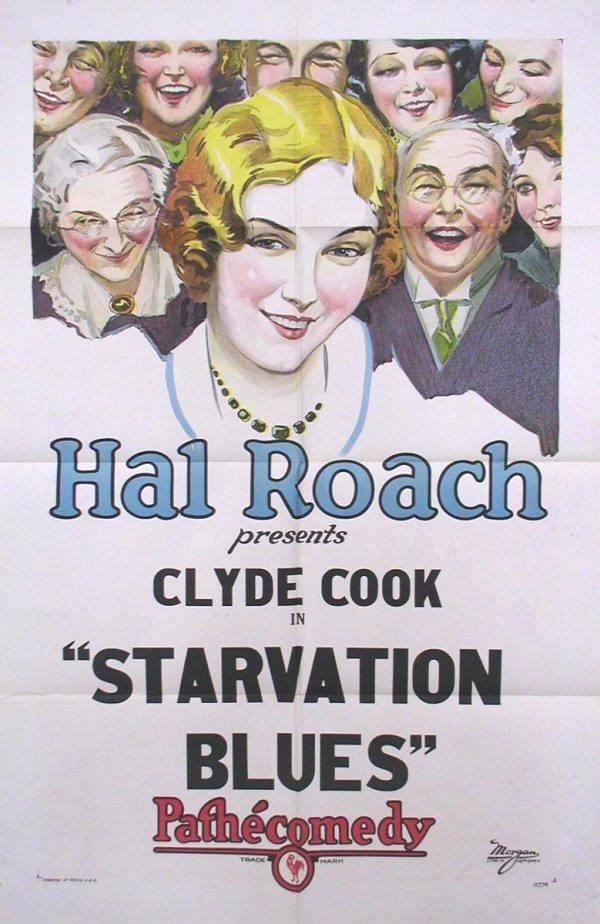
- Directed by: Richard Wallace
- Written by: Stan Laurel; Sherbourne Shields; Frank Terry; H.M. Walker; Richard Wallace
- Produced by: Hal Roach
- Cinematography: Len Powers
- Edited by: Richard C. Currier
- Distributed by: Pathé Exchange
- Release date: December 13, 1925
- Country: United States

Complete film.

Starvation Blues is a 1925 silent short subject comedy film. It stars Syd Crossley and Clyde Cook as street musicians struggling to eke out a living in the cold. Stan Laurel, one of the writers for the picture, would go on to explore a similar premise in his 1930 film Below Zero with Oliver Hardy.

== Cast ==
- Clyde Cook as 1st Street Musician
- Syd Crossley as 2nd Street Musician
- Mildred June as Cafe Owner's Daughter
- Cesare Gravina as Cafe Owner
- Frederick Kovert as Dancer (as Frederick Kovert)
- Fred Kelsey as Prohibition Officer
- Tiny Sandford as Policeman
