= Frederick Kovert =

Female impersonator

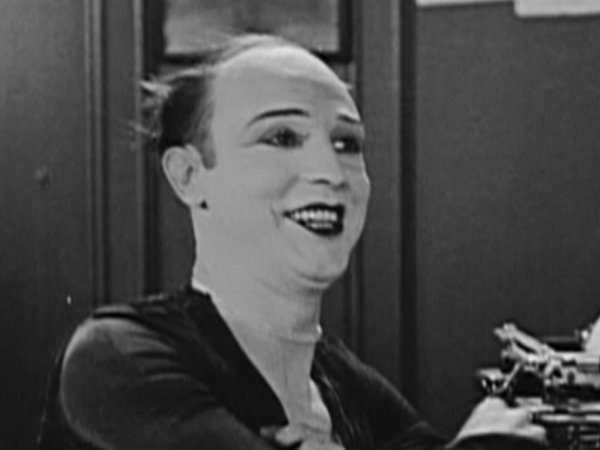
Kovert in the James Finlayson 1925 film Chasing the Chaser.

Frederick Kovert (sometimes written Ko Vert or KoVert) was an American female impersonator. Kovert appeared in drag in a number of comic roles in silent films of the 1920s. His first film role was in the 1920 film An Adventuress, alongside Julian Eltinge, then the best-known female impersonator in the entertainment world. Kovert appeared in the 1925 The Wizard of Oz, a silent film adaptation of L. Frank Baum's The Wonderful Wizard of Oz, and also designed the film's costumes.

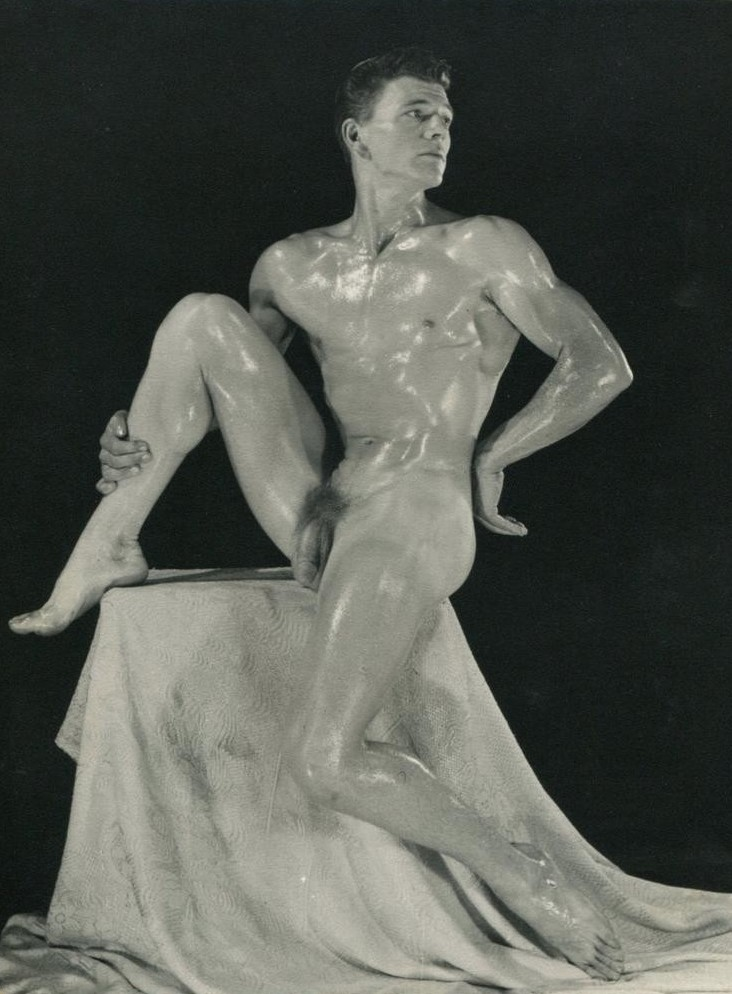
A photograph from Kovert's physique studio. Kovert's photography of male nudes made him a target for police, as such photographs were considered obscene.

Following the end of his career in film, Kovert became a physique photographer, operating under the name Kovert of Hollywood. Bob Mizer, who would go on to pioneer the physique magazine format with his Physique Pictorial, apprenticed under Kovert in the 1940s. Kovert's nude photography business made him a target for the Los Angeles Police Department vice squad, and in 1945 his studio was raided and he pled guilty to possession of obscene materials.

Kovert died in 1949 by a self-inflicted gunshot wound.

== Filmography ==
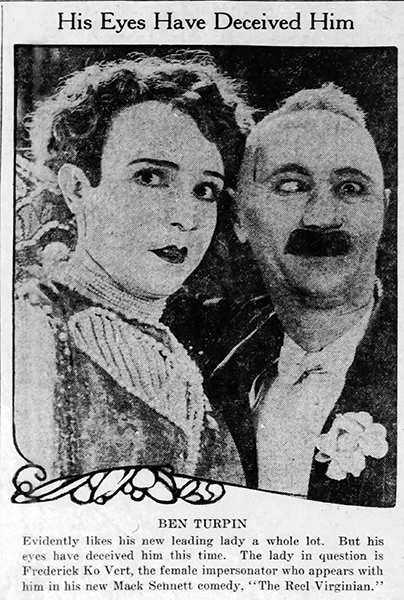
Kovert (left) with Ben Turpin in an advertisement for the 1924 comedy The Reel Virginian, directed by Mack Sennett.

Year	Title	Role	Notes
1920	An Adventuress	Lyn Brook (as Fred Covert)	
1921	The Queen of Sheba	Peacock	
1921	I Am Guilty	The Dancer (as Frederic De Kovert)	
1924	The Reel Virginian	Mlle. Sans Souci - the Detective (as Fred Kovert)	short
1925	The Wizard of Oz	Phantom of the Basket (as Frederic Ko Vert)	Kovert also served as costume designer.
1925	Chasing the Chaser	The Detective	
1925	The Unchastened Woman	The Dancer	uncredited
1925	Starvation Blues	Dancer (as Frederick Kovert)	short
1927	The First Night	Mimi/Jack White	
1931	The College Vamp	Female Impersonator	uncredited
