= Chasing the Chaser =

1925 film by Stan Laurel

- Directed by: Stan Laurel
- Written by: Stan Laurel; James Parrott; Rob Wagner
- Produced by: Hal Roach
- Starring: James Finlayson; Frederick Ko Vert; Helen Gilmore
- Cinematography: Art Lloyd
- Production company: Hal Roach Studios
- Distributed by: Pathé Exchange
- Release date: May 5, 1925
- Running time: 10 minutes
- Country: United States
- Language: Silent (English intertitles)

Chasing the Chaser is a 1925 American silent comedy film directed by Stan Laurel and starring female impersonator Frederick Ko Vert as a private detective hired to catch a roving husband (James Finlayson) in the act. It is the first film written and directed by Stan Laurel.

== Plot ==
A wife suspicious of her husband hires a cross-dressing private detective to test his fidelity. The detective has himself hired as the new maid of the household and attempts to lure the husband in, as the wife, hidden behind a curtain, looks on.

== Cast ==
- Frederick Ko Vert as The Detective
- James Finlayson as The Husband
- Marjorie Whiteis as The Wife
- William Gillespie (actor)William Gillespie as The Salesman
- Helen Gilmore as The Neighbor
- Fay Wray as The Nursemaid

== Reception ==
The July 4, 1925 edition of Motion Picture News favorably reviewed Ko Vert's performance in the film, stating that, "the acting honors go to the chap, unnamed in the cast, who does the female impersonation. It is a larger part than any of the others, and, it seems to us, the performer overshadows the other members of the company. Possibly, it is one of the most skillful female impersonations we have ever seen on the screen," though they did also state that, "the material is a much coarser fibre than that usualy employed in comedies from the Roach studios, which now and then fail to be funny but seldom fail to show better taste than is evident in the general tone and make-up of this film."
