= Along Came Auntie =

1926 film

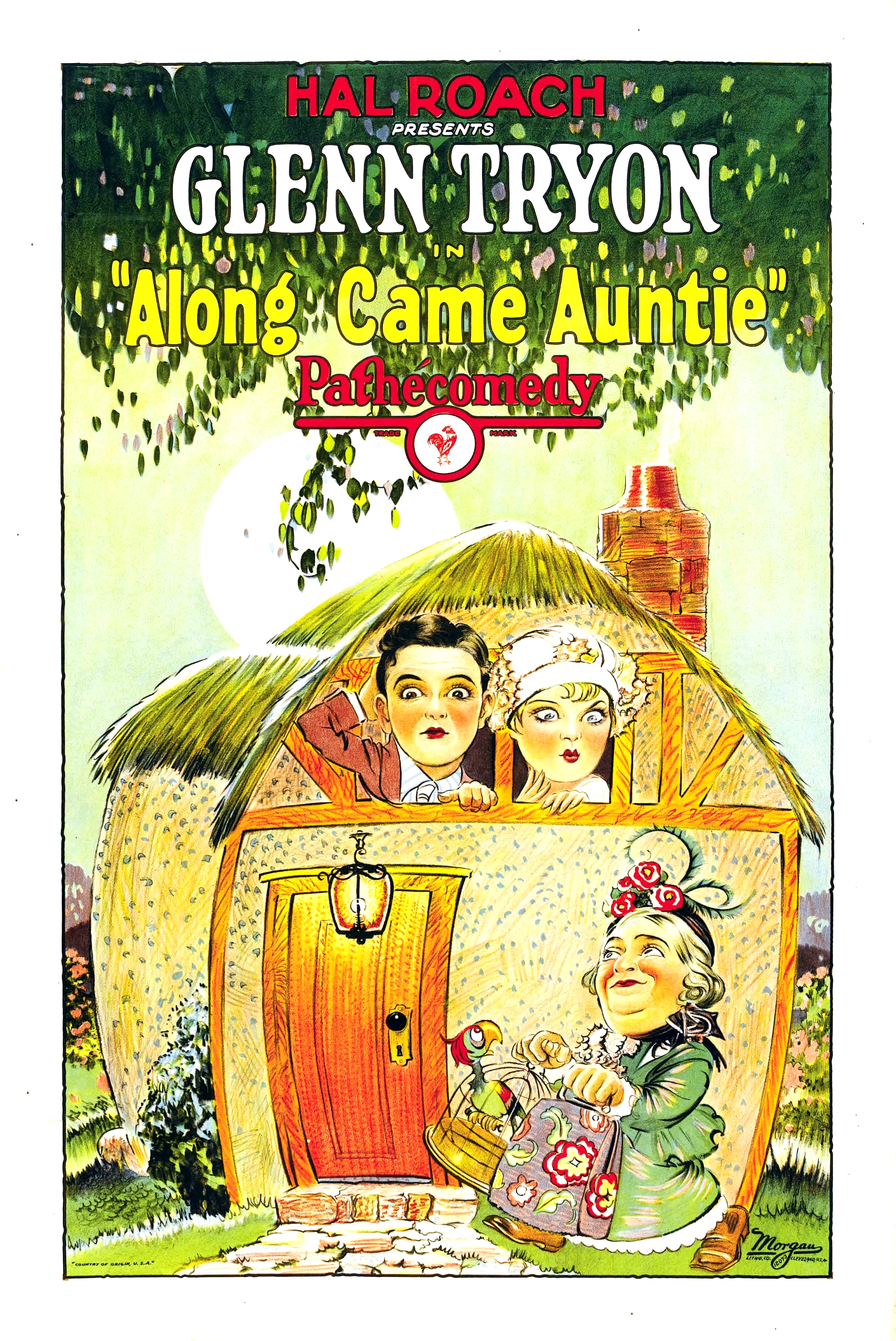
- Film poster
- Directed by: Fred Guiol; Richard Wallace
- Written by: Carl Harbaugh; Stan Laurel; James Parrott; Jerome Storm; Beatrice Van; H. M. Walker; Frank Wilson; Hal Yates
- Produced by: Hal Roach
- Starring: Oliver Hardy
- Cinematography: Floyd Jackman; Len Powers; Jack Roach
- Edited by: Richard C. Currier
- Distributed by: Pathé Exchange
- Release date: July 25, 1926
- Running time: 18:07
- Country: United States
- Language: Silent (English intertitles)

Along Came Auntie is a 1926 American silent comedy film directed by Fred Guiol and Richard Wallace featuring Glenn Tryon and Oliver Hardy.

== Plot ==
Mrs Remington Chow is concealing her second marriage from her aunt in order to receive a large inheritance. She is in financial difficulties and is thinking of taking in lodgers again much to the dismay of the maid. A man comes to the door with a bulldog and demands she pays her debt. As the maid goes out the man slips in.

Mr Chow comes back from holiday as her first husband is entertaining her with a violin. The debt collector is hiding in the piano. As he emerges, he gets tangled up in a fight between husbands. Aunt Alvira arrives. Mrs Chow says she is still married to Vincent. Mrs Chow says they are friends playing a rough game "Duck the Knob". Mrs Chow tells her husband to pretend to be the lodger.

Auntie likes Vincent and sits on his knee. She spies Mrs Chow kissing who she thinks is the lodger and gets Vincent to interject. Mr Chow gets his gun.

== Cast ==
- Glenn Tryon as Mr. Chow, the 2nd husband
- Vivien Oakland as Mrs. Remington Chow, the wife
- Oliver Hardy as Mr. Vincent Belcher, the first husband
- Tyler Brooke as The Under-Sheriff
- Martha Sleeper as Marie, the maid
- Lucy Beaumont as Aunt Alvira

== History and preservation status ==
This two-reel film was released on July 25, 1926. The film survives complete at the Library of Congress.

== See also ==
- Oliver Hardy filmography
