= Two-Time Mama =

1927 film

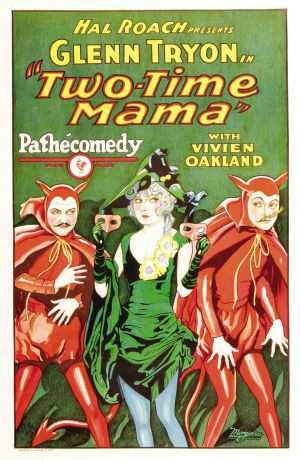
- Film poster
- Directed by: Fred Guiol
- Produced by: Hal Roach
- Starring: Oliver Hardy
- Cinematography: Floyd Jackman
- Edited by: Leroy O. Lodwig
- Distributed by: Pathé Exchange
- Release date: January 23, 1927
- Running time: 20 minutes
- Country: United States
- Languages: Silent; English intertitles

Two-Time Mama is a 1927 American silent short comedy film featuring Oliver Hardy.

== Plot ==
According to the copyright description, "Tyler and Anita are a happily married couple - ditto Glenn and Vivien. Tyler can't see his wife's Spanish costume for the costume ball which is going to be held on the roof of the apartment house, and Glenn can't see his wife's garb, either. Finally both wuves [sic], angry refuse to go. Glenn and Tyler go - Glenn in a devil's costume. Glenn is the sort of husband who wouldn't flirt with another woman than his wife because his conscious would hurt him. Tyler is the sort who wouldn't avoid flirting because his pride would hurt him if he did. Vivien decides to change her costume and go to the ball in strange costume so she can see if Glenn, her husband, will flirt, knowing he won't recognize her. Meantime, when she first appears at the ball, Glenn won't flirt and willingly goes to another room and let's Tyler have his devil's suit to carry on the flirtation as the same man. Tyler dons the suit, Vivien thinks it's her husband, and the flirtation starts. By the time Anita has found out from Glenn that the man she saw going up the elevator with a beautiful woman who is her own husband and not Glenn, and Glenn has started off to warn Tyler that his wife is looking for him, the plot has gotten so thick neither husband knows his own wife."

== Cast ==
- Tyler Brooke as Mr. Dazzle a.k.a. The Devil
- Anita Garvin as Mrs. Dazzle
- Glenn Tryon as Mr. Brown
- Vivien Oakland as Mrs. Brown
- Gale Henry as Nora a.k.a. Snoopy, the Maid
- Jackie Hanes
- Oliver Hardy as Cop (as Babe Hardy)

== See also ==
- List of American films of 1927
- Oliver Hardy filmography
