= Madame Mystery =

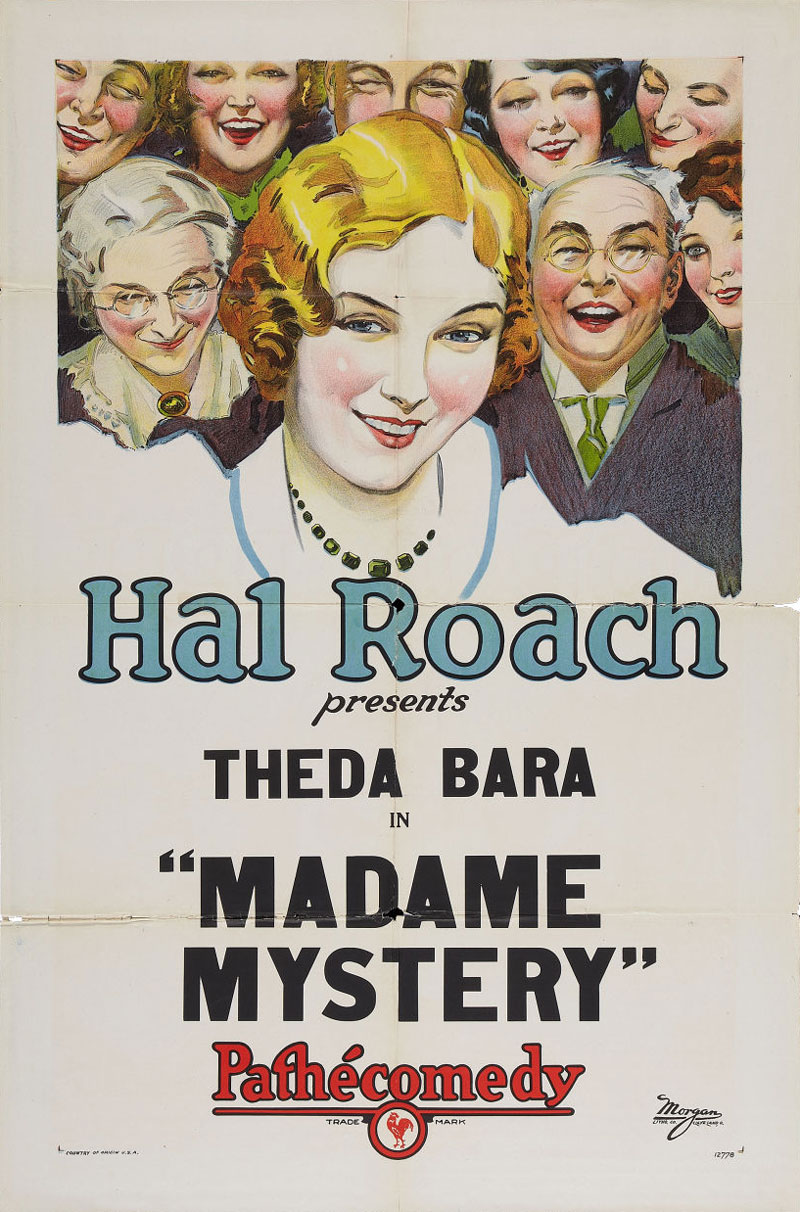
- Theatrical release poster
- Directed by: Richard Wallace; Stan Laurel
- Written by: Carl Harbaugh; Stan Laurel; H. M. Walker; Hal Yates; Krag Johnson; Grover Jones; Hal Roach
- Produced by: Hal Roach
- Starring: Oliver Hardy
- Cinematography: Harry W. Gerstad; Floyd Jackman; Len Powers
- Edited by: Richard C. Currier
- Distributed by: Pathé Exchange
- Release date: April 18, 1926
- Running time: 21 minutes
- Country: United States
- Language: Silent (English intertitles)

The full film

Madame Mystery is a 1926 American silent comedy film starring Theda Bara, Oliver Hardy, and James Finlayson, directed by Richard Wallace and Stan Laurel, co-written by Laurel, and produced by Hal Roach. Footage from this film was reused in the Hal Roach two-reeler 45 Minutes From Hollywood (released December 26, 1926).

== Plot ==
The film is a lighthearted parody of a spy adventure, in which Theda Bara spoofs her famous femme fatale image. The plot revolves around a female secret agent, Madame Mysterieux (Theda Bara), who possesses a highly potent, city-leveling explosive gas. Two down-on-their-luck artists/authors, played by Tyler Brooke and James Finlayson, accidentally get involved when they stumble upon two unconscious secret agents who were pursuing Madame Mysterieux. Mistakenly believing there is a large reward, the duo assumes the agents' identities and follows the "mystery" woman onto an ocean liner bound for America. Aboard the ship, various comedic misadventures ensue as they attempt to retrieve the substance, culminating in Finlayson accidentally swallowing the gas and floating away like a balloon.

== Cast ==
- Theda Bara as Madame Mysterieux
- Tyler Brooke as Hungry artist
- James Finlayson as Struggling author
- Oliver Hardy as Captain Schmaltz
- Fred Malatesta as Man of a thousand eyes
- Martha Sleeper
- Sammy Brooks
- Helen Gilmore
- William Gillespie
- R.E. Madeson
- Marguerite Gonzalez

== Preservation Status ==
A complete print exists of this short film, making this film one of few extant films of Theda Bara.

== See also ==
- List of American films of 1926
