= Night Life in Hollywood =

1922 film

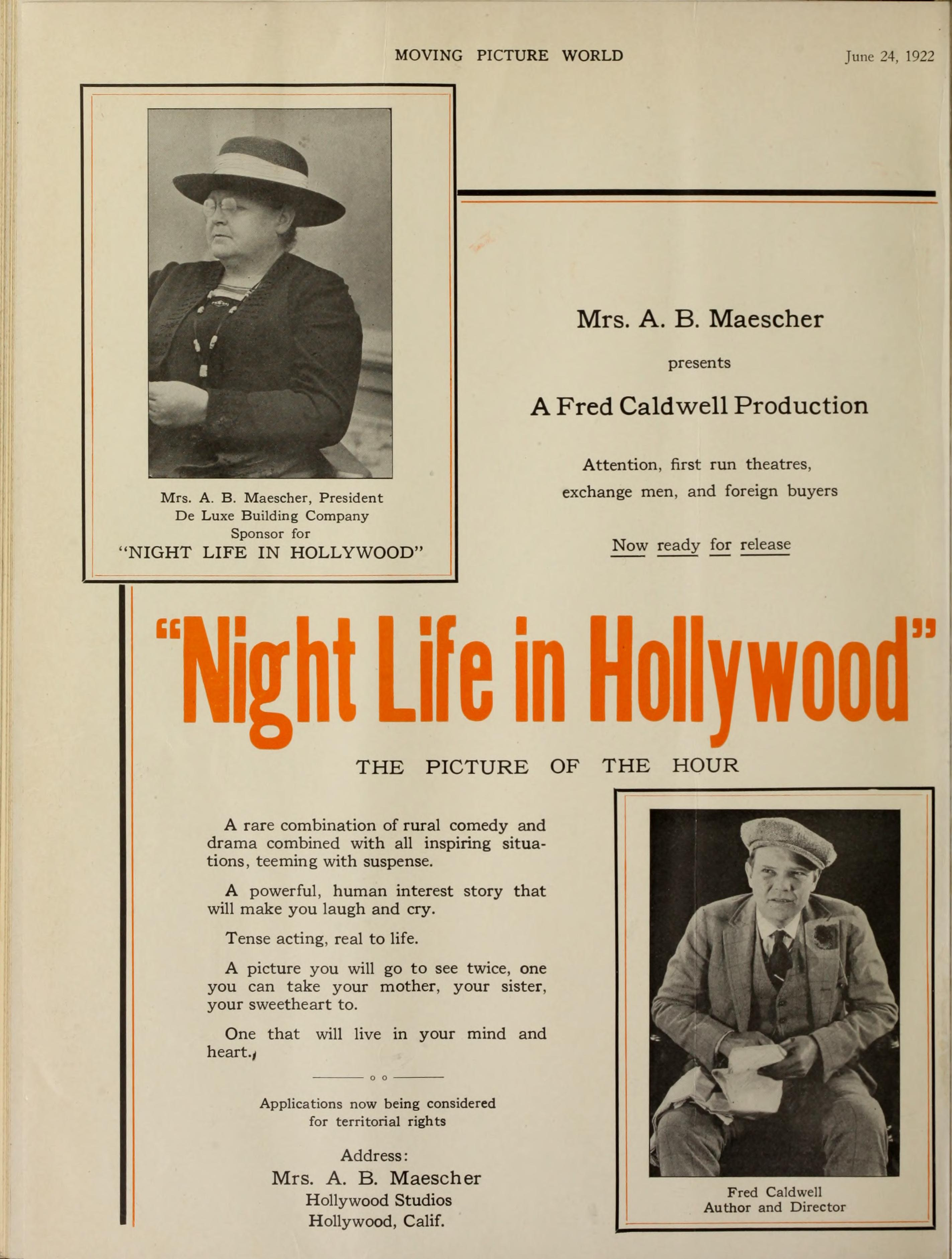
- Moving Picture World, June 1922
- Directed by: Fred Caldwell
- Written by: Fred Caldwell
- Starring: J. Frank Glendon; Josephine Hill; Gale Henry
- Production company: A.B. Maescher Productions
- Distributed by: Arrow Film Corporation
- Release date: November 15, 1922 (U.S.)
- Running time: 6 reels (approx. 60 mins)
- Country: United States
- Language: Silent (English intertitles)
- Budget: $75,000 (equivalent to $1,440,000 in 2025)

Night Life in Hollywood, called The Shriek of Hollywood in Europe, is a 1922 American silent comedy film directed by Fred Caldwell. It starred J. Frank Glendon, Josephine Hill, and Gale Henry, and featured a number of cameo appearances of celebrities with their families.

In 1922, Ada Bell Maescher organized the De Luxe Film Company to produce the propaganda picture, which would show the "real" living conditions in the film capital. Instead of depicting Hollywood as a lurid, sensual Babylon, with its reported debauches of depravity and wickedness, it was shown as a model city, beautiful and attractive, and populated with home-loving people.

== Plot ==
Joe Powell runs away from his small town in Arkansas to visit Hollywood, anticipating debauchery. After his sister Carrie Powell heads there too, their father, mother, and younger sister follow them out there. Once the family is reunited in Hollywood, they learn that it is great place to live.

== Cast ==
Main cast

- J. Frank Glendon as Joe Powell
- Josephine Hill as Leonora Baxter
- Gale Henry as Carrie Powell
- J. L. McComer as Pa Powell
- Elizabeth Rhodes as Ma Powell
- Jack Connolly as Wayne Elkins
- Delores Hall

Cameos

- Wallace Reid with his wife and their son
- Theodore Roberts
- J. Warren Kerrigan with his mother
- Sessue Hayakawa
- Tsuru Aoki
- William Desmond with his wife and two sons
- Bryant Washburn
- Bessie Love
- Johnny Jones

== Release and reception ==
Sheet music of the cues from the film were distributed to theaters, and theater owners were told to distribute them, free of charge, to their customers.

The film received mixed reviews, but was commercially successful.

== Preservation ==
An incomplete print of Night Life in Hollywood is held by the Library of Congress. The second reel of the film is considered lost.
