= Richard Wallace (director) =

Film director

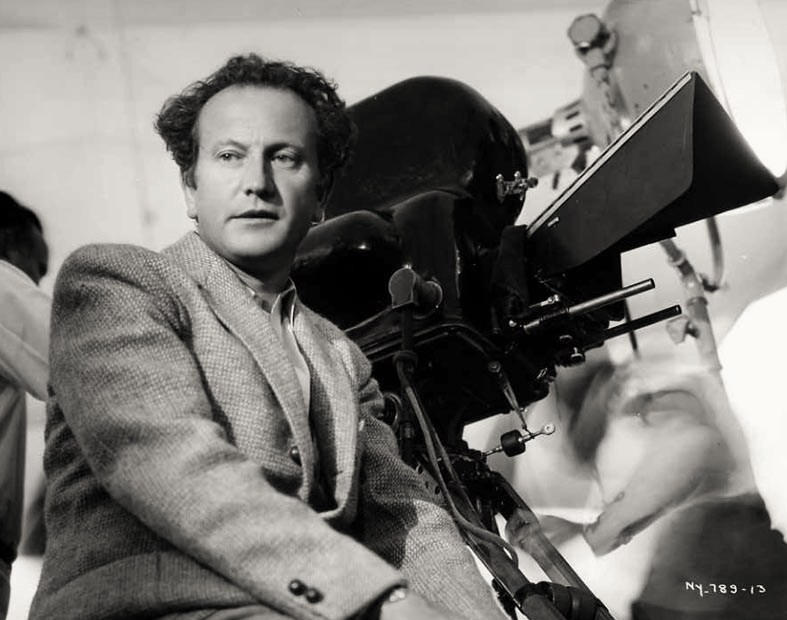
- Richard Wallace on the set of The Little Minister (1934)
- Born: Clarence Richard Wallace; August 26, 1894; Sacramento, California, U.S.
- Died: November 3, 1951 (aged 57); Los Angeles, California, U.S.
- Occupation: Film director
- Years active: 1925–1949

Richard Wallace (August 26, 1894 – November 3, 1951) was an American film director.

He began working in the editing department at Mack Sennett Studios in the early 1920s. He later moved on to rival Hal Roach Studios where he began directing two-reel films, on some of which he collaborated with Stan Laurel. In 1926, Wallace began directing feature-length films.

Several of Wallace's memorable films include three Shirley Temple films, A Night to Remember (1943) with Loretta Young, and The Little Minister (1934) with Katharine Hepburn. He was a founding member of the Directors Guild of America. He died of a heart attack.

== Filmography ==
- Starvation Blues (1925)
- Beware of Your Relatives (1925)
- Jiminy Crickets (1925)
- One Wild Night (1925)
- Ice Cold (1925)
- Raggedy Rose (1926)
- Syncopating Sue (1926)
- The Merry Widower (1926)
- Along Came Auntie (uncredited, 1926)
- Never Too Old (1926)
- Madame Mystery (1926)
- So This Is Paris? (1926) short film; not the 1926 Lubitsch feature film
- Dizzy Daddies (1926)
- Tight Cargo (1926)
- What's the World Coming To? (1926)
- The Honeymoon Hotel (1926)
- A Texas Steer (1927)
- American Beauty (1927)
- The Poor Nut (1927)
- McFadden's Flats (1927)
- The Shopworn Angel (1928)
- The Butter and Egg Man (1928)
- Lady Be Good (1928)
- Heart Trouble (1928)
- River of Romance (1929)
- Innocents of Paris (1929)
- The Right to Love (1930)
- Anybody's War (1930)
- Seven Days' Leave (1930)
- The Road to Reno (1931)
- Kick In (1931)
- Man of the World (1931)
- Thunder Below (1932)
- Tomorrow and Tomorrow (1932)
- The Masquerader (1933)
- The Little Minister (1934)
- Eight Girls in a Boat (1934)
- Wedding Present (1936)
- Blossoms on Broadway (1937)
- John Meade's Woman (1937)
- The Under-Pup (1939)
- The Young in Heart (1938)
- Captain Caution (1940)
- She Knew All the Answers (1941)
- A Girl, a Guy, and a Gob (1941)
- The Wife Takes a Flyer (1942)
- Obliging Young Lady (1942)
- A Night to Remember (1942)
- Bombardier (1943)
- The Fallen Sparrow (1943)
- My Kingdom for a Cook (1943)
- Bride by Mistake (1944)
- Kiss and Tell (1945)
- It's in the Bag! (1945)
- Because of Him (1946)
- Tycoon (1947)
- Framed (1947)
- Sinbad the Sailor (1947)
- Let's Live a Little (1948)
- A Kiss for Corliss (1949)
- Adventure in Baltimore (1949)
