= Get 'Em Young =

1926 film

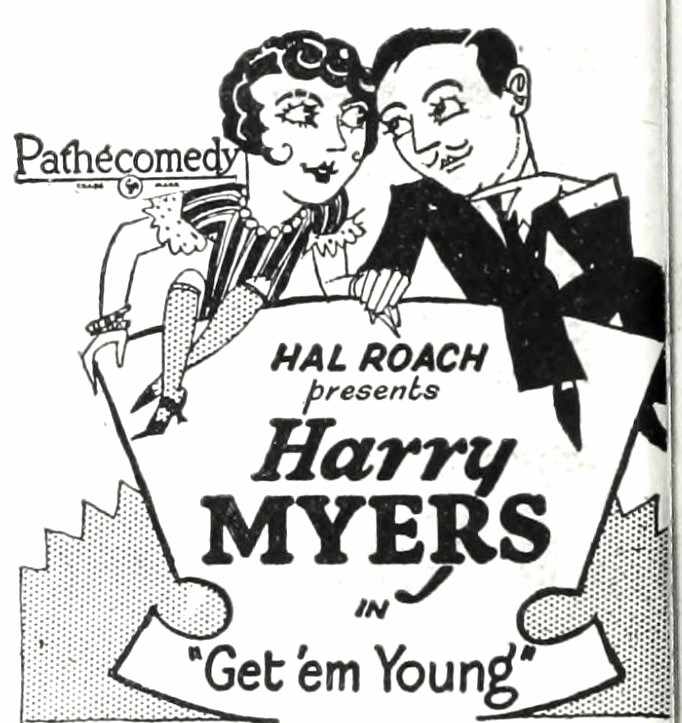
- Cornerblock advertisement
- Directed by: Fred Guiol; Stan Laurel
- Written by: Stan Laurel; James Parrott; H. M. Walker; Hal Yates
- Produced by: Hal Roach
- Starring: Stan Laurel
- Cinematography: Harry W. Gerstad; Alvin Lange; Frank Young
- Production company: Hal Roach Studios
- Distributed by: Pathé Exchange
- Release date: October 31, 1926
- Running time: 2 reels
- Country: United States
- Language: Silent (English intertitles)

Get 'Em Young is a 1926 American short comedy film starring Stan Laurel.

== Cast ==
- Harry Myers as Orvid Joy
- Eugenia Gilbert as The girl
- Stan Laurel as Summers, the butler
- Max Davidson as Isaac Goldberg, a lawyer
- Charlotte Mineau as Hired bride
- Fred Malatesta as Executor
- Ernest Wood as Lawrence Lavendar Virgin, a female impersonator (credited as Ernie Wood)

== Production notes ==
Oliver Hardy was originally cast as Summers, the butler, in this short film, but had to be replaced before filming by Stan Laurel, who had not acted in films for about a year as he had been working as a writer and director, and with whom he would soon team up with at the Hal Roach Studios. Hardy had been injured in a cooking accident at home where he burned his arm after a frying pan of scalding grease spilled onto it, and was still recovering when filming for Get 'em Young began. This accident forced Hardy to be removed from the cast of the Mabel Normand film Raggedy Rose as well.

== Theatre fire incident ==
This was the film being shown at the 1927 Laurier Palace Theatre fire in Montreal, Canada, where 78 people died, all but one under age 16.

== See also ==
- List of American films of 1926
- Stan Laurel filmography
