= Ada Bell Maescher =

American club woman and building contractor (1868–1939)

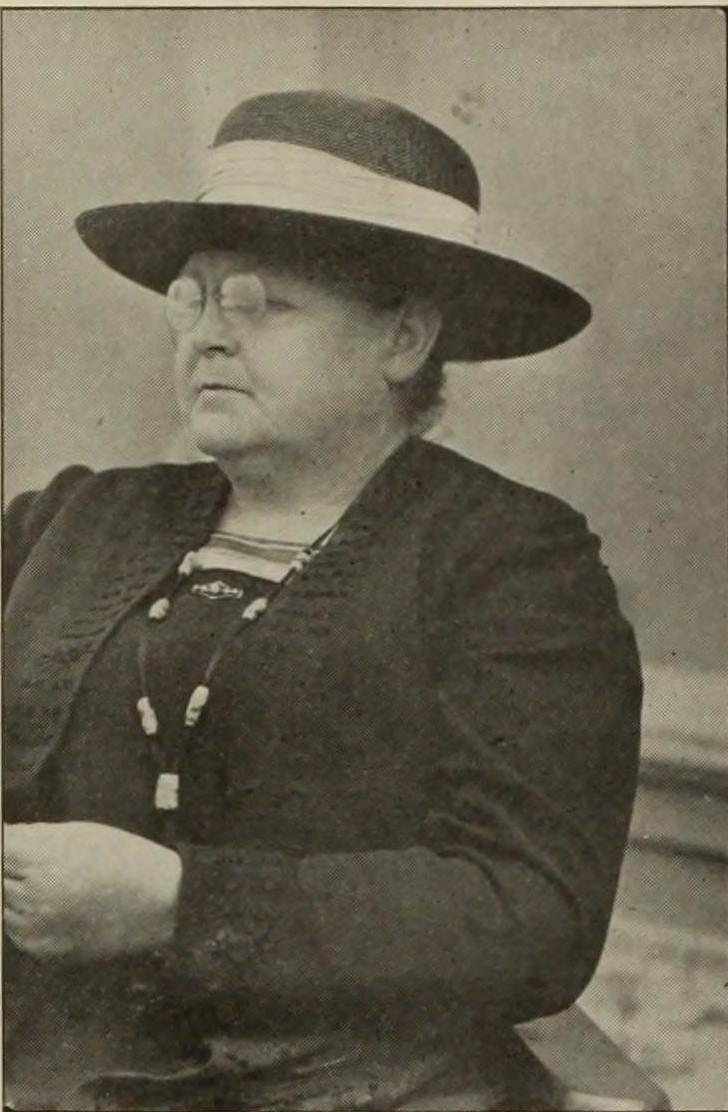
Ada Bell Maescher

Ada Bell Harper Maescher (January 24, 1868 – September 2, 1939) was an American club woman and president of the De Luxe Building Company, a home building and architecture design firm. She was one of the most successful women contractors in the United States during the early 1920s.

== Early life ==
Ada Bell Harper Maescher was born on January 24, 1868, in Ripley County, Indiana, the daughter of Dr. William R. Harper (1825–1886) and Luvicy Hughes (1827–1902).

== Career ==
Maescher published five books on building industry and was founder, and for seventeen years president, of the De Luxe Building Company, a home building and architecture design firm. She was among United States' most successful women contractors during the early 1920s. At the beginning of the 20th century, the De Luxe Building Co. used trade catalogs to propose different option to potential buyers like: "Kozy-homes", a selection of artistic little houses designed to meet the demands of those seeking plans for economical homes with the maximum convenience, and "Plan-kraft", homes for progressive people who wish to build homes that were different, Swiss chalets and Japanese architectures.

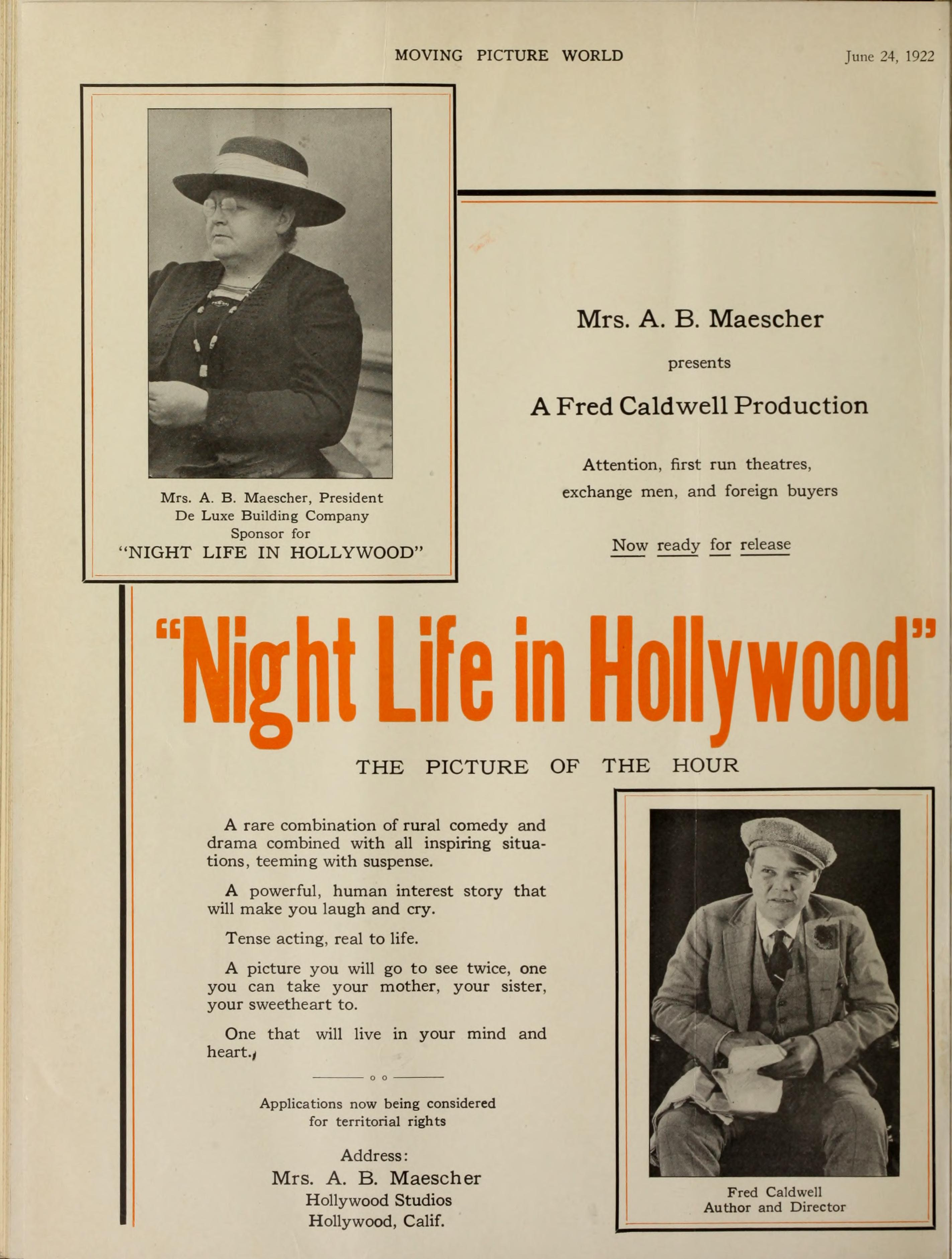
Ada Bell Maescher, Moving Picture World Jun 1922

In 1922, Maescher organized the De Luxe Film Company to produce a propaganda picture, Night Life in Hollywood, which would show the "real" living conditions in the film capital. Instead of depicting Hollywood as a lurid, sensual Babylon, with its reported debauches of depravity and wickedness, it was shown as a model city, beautiful and attractive, and populated with home-loving people. The film cost approximately $100,000 ($1.92 million in today's money). She then planned the Los Angeles permanent grand opera; as first step toward this target she financed the presentation of Giuseppe Verdi's opera Aida which was given at the Hollywood Bowl in 1923.

== Personal life ==
Maescher moved to California in 1906 and lived at 4652 Mascot St., Los Angeles, California. She married Victor Emanuel Maescher (1874–1938) and had one daughter, Roxye Mae Thompson Paddison (1887–1972). She was interested in Nature and Preservation of Bird Life, and was a member of the Southern California Nature Club, Audubon Society, and Cooper Ornithological Club.

She died on September 2, 1939, and was buried with her husband at Forest Lawn Memorial Park (Glendale).
