= Carl Harbaugh =

American actor

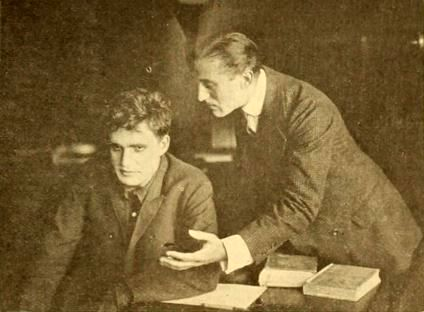
- Rockliffe Fellowes and Carl Harbaugh in Regeneration (1915)
- Born: 1885 or 1886; Washington, D.C., US
- Died: February 26, 1960 (aged 74); Hollywood, California, US
- Occupations: Actor; screenwriter; film director
- Years active: 1912–1957

Carl Harbaugh (1885 or 1886 – February 26, 1960) was an American film actor, screenwriter and director.

== Biography ==
On Broadway, Harbaugh performed in The Greyhound (1912) and The Bludgeon (1914).

He was married to Frances Lawson Bouis (? – 1922). Toward the end of his career, he continued to act in the biopic Gentleman Jim (1942), the action picture Northern Pursuit (1943) and the action flick Uncertain Glory (1944). He also appeared in The Far Country (1955) and The Tall Men (1955). Harbaugh last acted in The Revolt of Mamie Stover (1956).

Harbaugh died on February 26, 1960, at the age of 74 in the Motion Picture Hospital.

== Filmography ==
- Regeneration (1915) – District Attorney Ames
- Carmen (1915) – Escamillo
- The Serpent (1916) – Prince Valanoff
- Big Jim Garrity (1916) – Dawson
- The Test (1916) – Richard Tretman
- Arms and the Woman (1916) – Carl
- The Iron Woman (1916, director)
- When False Tongues Speak (1917) – Fred Walton
- A Rich Man's Plaything (1917, director)
- Jack Spurlock, Prodigal (1918, director)
- Other Men's Daughters (1918, director)
- The Other Man's Wife (1919, director)
- Hickville to Broadway (1921, director)
- Bucking the Line (1921, director)
- Big Town Ideas (1921, director)
- Jazzmania (1923) – Gavona
- Lost and Found on a South Sea Island (1923) – Waki
- The Silent Command (1923) – Menchen
- Yes, Yes, Nanette (1925, Short, Writer)
- Wife Tamers (1926, Short, Writer)
- Madame Mystery (1926, Short, Writer)
- Say It with Babies (1926, Short, Writer)
- Thundering Fleas (1926, Short, Writer)
- Along Came Auntie (1926, Short, Writer)
- College (1927) – Crew Coach
- Steamboat Bill, Jr. (1928, Writer)
- The Devil's Brother (1933) – Second Woodchopper (uncredited)
- Just an Echo (1934, Short)
- Klondike Annie (1936) – Port Officer (uncredited)
- The Last Train from Madrid (1937) – Militiaman (uncredited)
- Three Legionnaires (1937, writer)
- Artists and Models (1937) – King (uncredited)
- Prison Farm (1938) – Guard (uncredited)
- The Texans (1938) – Union Soldier (uncredited)
- Sons of the Legion (1938) – Customer
- St. Louis Blues (1939) – Actor (uncredited)
- I'm from Missouri (1939) – Mule Man (uncredited)
- The Roaring Twenties (1939) – Street-Cleaner (uncredited)
- British Intelligence (1940) – German Soldier (uncredited)
- Tear Gas Squad (1940) – Policeman (uncredited)
- They Drive by Night (1940) – Mechanic (uncredited)
- High Sierra (1941) – Fisherman (uncredited)
- The Strawberry Blonde (1941) – Workman (uncredited)
- The Great Mr. Nobody (1941) – Bartender (uncredited)
- Manpower (1941) – Noisy Nash (uncredited)
- They Died with Their Boots On (1941) – Sergeant (uncredited)
- Desperate Journey (1942) – German Soldier (uncredited)
- Gentleman Jim (1942) – Smith (uncredited)
- Background to Danger (1943) – Butler (uncredited)
- Northern Pursuit (1943) – Radio Operator (uncredited)
- Uncertain Glory (1944) – Innkeeper (uncredited)
- Salty O'Rourke (1945) – Waiter (uncredited)
- The Horn Blows at Midnight (1945) – Tipsy Gent (uncredited)
- San Antonio (1945) – Cowman (uncredited)
- The Man I Love (1947) – Bartender (uncredited)
- Pursued (1947) – Bartender (uncredited)
- Cheyenne (1947) – Bartender (uncredited)
- Silver River (1948) – Blake (uncredited)
- Fighter Squadron (1948) – Cockney (uncredited)
- One Sunday Afternoon (1948) – Ship's Officer (uncredited)
- Colorado Territory (1949) – Brakeman (uncredited)
- White Heat (1949) – Foreman (uncredited)
- The Daughter of Rosie O'Grady (1950) – Joe, Stage Doorman (uncredited)
- Storm Warning (1951) – Townsman (uncredited)
- Lullaby of Broadway (1951) – Doorman (uncredited)
- Along the Great Divide (1951) – Jerome (uncredited)
- Distant Drums (1951) – M. Duprez (uncredited)
- Glory Alley (1952) – Waiter (uncredited)
- The World in His Arms (1952) – Seaman (uncredited)
- Blackbeard the Pirate (1952) – Helmsman (uncredited)
- The Lawless Breed (1953) – Drunk (uncredited)
- Gun Fury (1953) – The Barber (uncredited)
- The Far Country (1954) – Sourdough (uncredited)
- Battle Cry (1955) – New Zealander in Bar (uncredited)
- The Tall Men (1955) – Salesman (uncredited)
- The Revolt of Mamie Stover (1956) – Minor Role (uncredited)
- Band of Angels (1957) – Seaman (uncredited)
