= Marion Byron =

American comedian and actress (1911–1985)

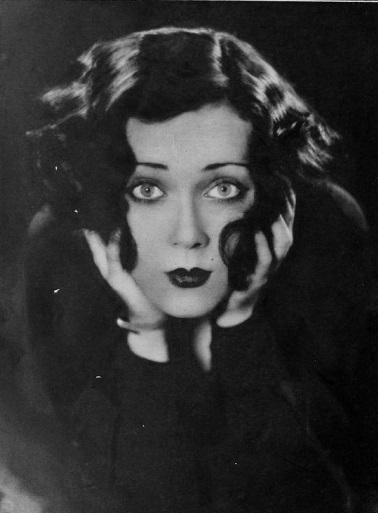
- Byron in 1929
- Born: Miriam Bilenkin; March 16, 1911; Dayton, Ohio, U.S.
- Died: July 5, 1985 (aged 74); Santa Monica, California, U.S.
- Other name: Peanuts
- Occupations: Comedian; actress
- Years active: 1928–1938
- Children: 2

Marion Byron (born Miriam Bilenkin; March 16, 1911 – July 5, 1985) was an American silent film actress and comedian.

== Early years ==
Byron was born Miriam Bilenkin in Dayton, Ohio, one of five daughters of Louis and Bertha Bilenkin. She had four sisters, one of whom (Esther) was an actress. Her education occurred in Dayton, Denver, Detroit, and Los Angeles, with most of her preparation for acting in the latter.

== Career ==
She made her first stage appearance at the age of 13 and followed it with a role in actor-producer Lupino Lane's Hollywood Music Box Revue opposite Fannie Brice. It was while appearing in this production that she was given the nickname "Peanuts" because of her short stature. While appearing in The Strawberry Blonde, she came to the attention of Buster Keaton who signed her as his leading lady in the film Steamboat Bill, Jr. in 1928 when she was just 16. (Keaton, standing 5' 5", was careful to cast ingenues who were petite, so they would photograph well opposite Keaton.)

From there she was hired by Hal Roach who teamed her with Anita Garvin in a bid to create a female version of Laurel and Hardy. The pairing was not a commercial success and they made only three short comedies: Feed 'Em and Weep (1928), A Pair of Tights (1928), and Going Ga-Ga (1929).

She left the Roach studio before it made talking comedies, then worked in musical features like the Vitaphone film Broadway Babies (1929) with Alice White, and the early Technicolor feature Golden Dawn (1930).

Her parts slowly got smaller until they were unbilled walk-ons in movies like Meet the Baron (1933), starring Jack Pearl and Hips Hips Hooray (1934) with Wheeler and Woolsey; she returned to the Hal Roach studio for a bit part in the Charley Chase short It Happened One Day (1934). Her final screen appearance was as a baby nurse to the Dionne Quintuplets in Five of a Kind (1938).

== Family ==
Byron married screenwriter Lou Breslow in 1932 and they had two sons, Lawrence and Daniel. They remained together until her death in Santa Monica on July 5, 1985, following a long illness. Her ashes were later scattered in the sea.

== Selected filmography ==
- Five of a Kind (1938)
- Gift of Gab (1934)
- It Happened One Day (1934, short subject)
- Hips, Hips, Hooray! (1934)
- Swellhead (1933, released 1935)
- Only Yesterday (1933)
- Meet the Baron (1933)
- Husbands’ Reunion (1933, Mack Sennett short subject)
- College Humor (1933)
- Melody Cruise (1933)
- Breed of the Border (1933)
- The Crime of the Century (1933)
- The Curse of a Broken Heart (1933, short subject)
- Lucky Devils (1933)
- Trouble in Paradise (1932)
- They Call It Sin (1932)
- Love Me Tonight (1933)
- The Hollywood Handicap (1932, short subject)
- Week Ends Only (1932)
- The Tenderfoot (1932)
- The Heart of New York (1932)
- Running Hollywood (1932, short subject)
- Working Girls (1931)
- Children of Dreams (1931)
- Girls Demand Excitement (1931)
- The Bad Man (1930)
- The Matrimonial Bed (1930)
- Golden Dawn (1930)
- Song of the West (1930)
- Playing Around (1930)
- Show of Shows (1929)
- The Forward Pass (1929)
- So Long Letty (1929)
- Social Sinners (1929)
- Broadway Babies (1929)
- Is Everybody Happy? (1929)
- The Unkissed Man (1929, short subject)
- His Captive Woman (1929)
- Going Ga–Ga (1929, short subject co-starring with Anita Garvin)
- A Pair of Tights (1928, short subject co-starring with Anita Garvin)
- Feed ’Em and Weep (1928, short subject co-starring with Anita Garvin)
- The Boy Friend (1928, short subject)
- Plastered in Paris (1928)
- Steamboat Bill, Jr. (1928, ingenue lead opposite Buster Keaton)
