= Tyler Brooke =

American actor (1886–1943)

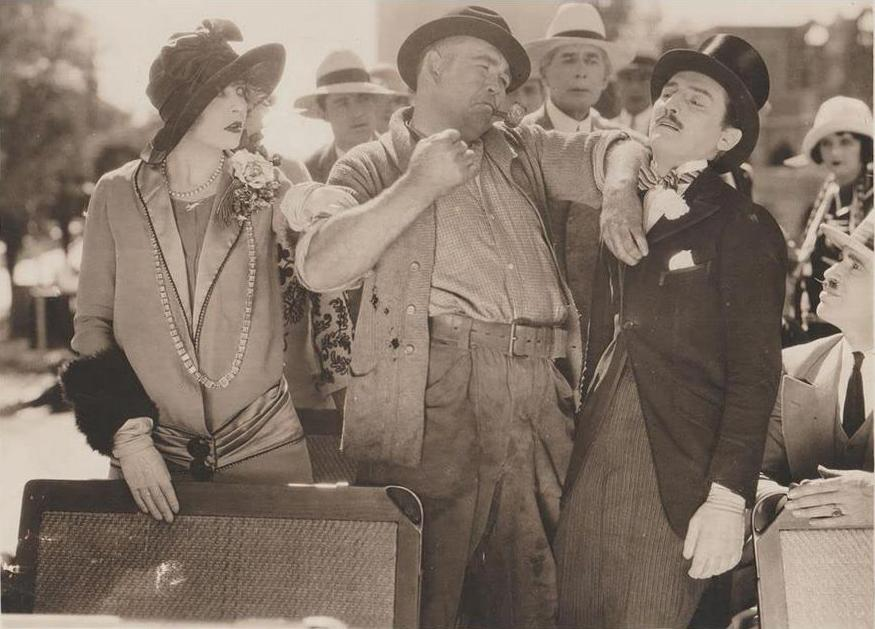
- Brooke (third from right) in Laughing Ladies (1925)
- Born: Victor Hugo de Bierre; June 6, 1886; New York City, U.S.
- Died: March 2, 1943 (aged 56); Los Angeles, California, U.S.
- Occupation: Actor
- Years active: 1915-1943

Tyler Brooke (born Victor Hugo de Bierre, June 6, 1886 – March 2, 1943) was an American film actor. He appeared in more than 90 films between 1915 and 1943. He was born in New York City and died in Los Angeles, California by committing suicide by carbon monoxide poisoning.

Before he became an entertainer, Brooke was a bank clerk and an attorney.

He began on the stage at the Globe Theatre, New York City in 1912. He went to Los Angeles in 1925 with No, No, Nanette as a comedian and was captured for screen. He worked for Hal Roach for a year and a half before going into other films.

In 1929, he sued Oliver Hardy for $109,570 damages, alleging that Hardy struck him across the arm with a billiard cue, fracturing it and preventing him working for 12 weeks.

== Partial filmography ==
- Frozen Hearts (1923, Short)
- Wandering Papas (1926, Short) - Onion, a Bridge Engineer
- Madame Mystery (1926, Short) - Hungry Artist
- Along Came Auntie (1926, Short) - The Under-Sheriff
- Crazy Like a Fox (1926, Short)
- On the Front Page (1926, Short) - Young Hornby
- Stage Madness (1927) - H.H. Bragg
- Two-Time Mama (1927, Short) - Mr. Dazzle aka The Devil
- The Honorable Mr. Buggs (1927, Short)
- Rich But Honest (1927) - Barney Zoom
- Cradle Snatchers (1927) - Osteopath
- Fazil (1928) - Jacques Dubreuze
- None but the Brave (1928) - Hotel Clerk
- The Bees' Buzz (1929, Short) - Tyler Smith - Peggy's Suitor
- Dynamite (1929) - The Life of the Party
- Lilies of the Field (1930) - Bert Miller
- The Furies (1930) - Smith
- The Divorcee (1930) - Hank
- Monte Carlo (1930) - Armand
- Madam Satan (1930) - Romeo
- Playboy of Paris (1930) - Cadeaux
- New Moon (1930) - Gossipy Passenger on Ship (uncredited)
- Sweepstakes (1931) - Master of Ceremonies (uncredited)
- The Magnificent Lie (1931) - Pierre LeCoeur
- A Dangerous Affair (1931) - Harvey
- Million Dollar Legs (1932) - Olympics Announcer (uncredited)
- Love Me Tonight (1932) - Composer (uncredited)
- Trouble in Paradise (1932) - Commercial Singer (uncredited)
- Hallelujah, I'm a Bum (1933) - Mayor's Secretary
- Child of Manhattan (1933) - Dulcey (uncredited)
- Don't Bet on Love (1933) - Minor Role (uncredited)
- Morning Glory (1933) - Charles Van Duesen
- My Lips Betray (1933) - Radio Announcer (uncredited)
- Blind Date (1934) - Emory
- Belle of the Nineties (1934) - Comedian
- The Merry Widow (1934) - Escort (uncredited)
- Imitation of Life (1934) - Tipsy Man at Party (uncredited)
- 365 Nights in Hollywood (1934) - Casting Director (uncredited)
- Mrs. Wiggs of the Cabbage Patch (1934)
- Night Life of the Gods (1935) - Store Manager (uncredited)
- Times Square Lady (1935) - Casa Nova Bandmaster (uncredited)
- Call of the Wild (1935) - Jim, Man on Stage with Show Girls (uncredited)
- Here Comes the Band (1935) - Dentist
- It's in the Air (1935) - Hotel Clerk (uncredited)
- Next Time We Love (1936) - Author (uncredited)
- Poor Little Rich Girl (1936) - Dan Ward
- Suzy (1936) - Raoul (uncredited)
- To Mary – with Love (1936) - Guest
- In His Steps (1936) - (uncredited)
- Two in a Crowd (1936) - Charles Brock (uncredited)
- All American Chump (1936) - Andrews (uncredited)
- This Is My Affair (1937) - Specialty
- You Can't Have Everything (1937) - Hotel Clerk (uncredited)
- In Old Chicago (1938) - Speciality Singer
- Bluebeard's Eighth Wife (1938) - Clerk
- Alexander's Ragtime Band (1938) - Assistant Stage Manager (uncredited)
- Tom Sawyer, Detective (1938) - Store Clerk (uncredited)
- Pacific Liner (1939) - Ship Steward (uncredited)
- The Story of Alexander Graham Bell (1939) - Mr. Calhoun (uncredited)
- The Wizard of Oz (1939) - Emerald City citizen (uncredited)
- Little Old New York (1940) - Singer
- One Night in the Tropics (1940) - First Man Polled by Jim (uncredited)
- Street of Memories (1940) - Barbershop Manager (uncredited)
- Tin Pan Alley (1940) - Bert Melville
- Kitty Foyle (1940) - Husband in Prologue (uncredited)
- Lydia (1941) - Vaudeville Singer (uncredited)
- Two Latins from Manhattan (1941) - Hotel Clerk (uncredited)
- I Married an Angel (1942) - Lucien (uncredited)
- Lucky Legs (1942) - Jenkins (uncredited)
- The McGuerins from Brooklyn (1942) - Spa Desk Clerk (uncredited)
- She Has What It Takes (1943) - Stage Manager (uncredited)
