= A Pair of Tights =

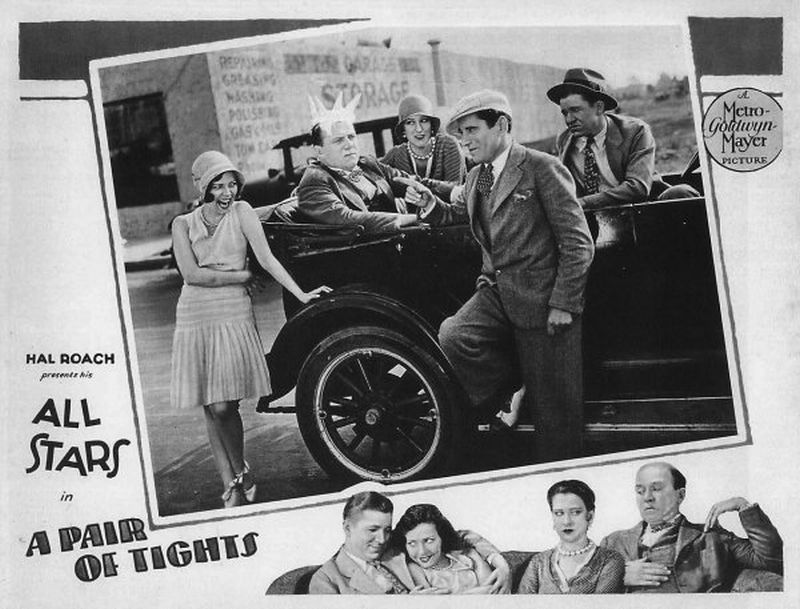
- Lobby card
- Directed by: Hal Yates
- Produced by: Hal Roach
- Starring: Anita Garvin; Marion Byron; Edgar Kennedy; Stuart Erwin
- Production company: Hal Roach Studios
- Distributed by: Metro-Goldwyn-Mayer
- Release date: December 1928 (US)
- Running time: 20 minutes
- Country: United States
- Languages: Silent film; English intertitles

A Pair of Tights is a 1928 silent comedy short film starring Anita Garvin, Marion Byron, Edgar Kennedy and Stuart Erwin.

== Plot ==
The film

The plot sees penniless Garvin and Bryon on a double date with Bryon's boyfriend (Erwin) and his boss (Kennedy). The girls are hoping for dinner but the men are a pair of tightwads. The men will only pay for ice cream. Bryon's attempts to buy ice cream result in repeated loss of the ice creams to falls, accidents and other mishaps. In the meantime, the other three are trying to avoid the attentions of a policeman as there is no parking available at the ice cream parlour. The film ends with a mass brawl in common with many other Roach shorts of the time.

== Production ==
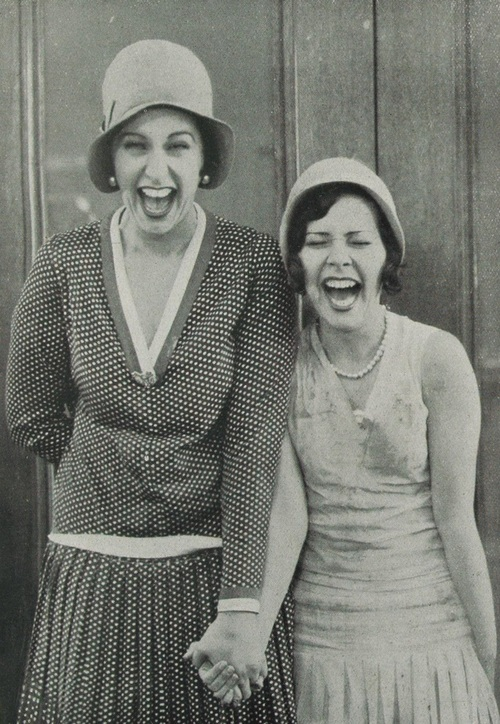
Publicity shot of Garvin (left) and Byron (right) taken during shooting of the film.

The film was produced by Hal Roach and was the third, and final pairing, of Garvin and Byron after Feed 'em and Weep and Going Ga-ga. Filmed in September 1928, the film was released towards the end of the year. The script came from the prodigious output at Roach's studios and was originally intended for Laurel and Hardy but as the pair were already busy, the film was recast.

== Sources ==
- Everson, William (1971). The Films of Hal Roach. Museum of Modern Art. ISBN 978-0870705595.
- Halliwell, Leslie (1987). Double Take and Fade Away. Grafton. ISBN 978-0246128355.
- Neibaur, James (2018). The Andy Clyde Columbia Comedies. McFarland. ISBN 978-1476668604.
- Roots, James (2017). 100 Essential Silent Film Comedies. Rowman & Littlefield. pp. 186–188. ISBN 978-1442278240.
- Walker, Brent (2002). "THE ROBERT YOUNGSON COMPILATIONS: Identification of Film Sources". The Moving Image: The Journal of the Association of Moving Image Archivists. 2 (1): 130–174. ISSN 1532-3978. JSTOR 41164577.
