= Hal Yates =

American screenwriter (1899–1969)

- Born: July 26, 1899; Chicago, Illinois, USA
- Died: August 1, 1969 (aged 70); Los Angeles, California, USA
- Occupations: Screenwriter; Film director
- Years active: 1924-1953

Hal Yates (July 26, 1899 – August 1, 1969) was an American screenwriter and film director. He wrote for 96 films between 1924 and 1953. He also directed 88 films between 1926 and 1953.

He started his career in entertainment in a vaudeville double-act called 'Yates and Lawley'. Yates first worked at the Hal Roach Studios where he directed a few early Laurel and Hardy comedies (including the lost Hats Off), and later worked at the RKO studios directing short films featuring Edgar Kennedy and Leon Errol.

He was born in Chicago, Illinois, and died in Los Angeles, California.

== Selected Filmography ==
- Get 'Em Young (1926)
- The Nickel-Hopper (1926)
- Along Came Auntie (1926)
- Thundering Fleas (1926)
- Wife Tamers (1926)
- Say It with Babies (1926)
- Madame Mystery (1926)
- Wandering Papas (1926)
- What's the World Coming To? (1926)
- Hats Off (1927)
- A Pair of Tights (1928)
- Nobody's Baby (1937) (screenwriter only)
