= Gale Henry =

American actress

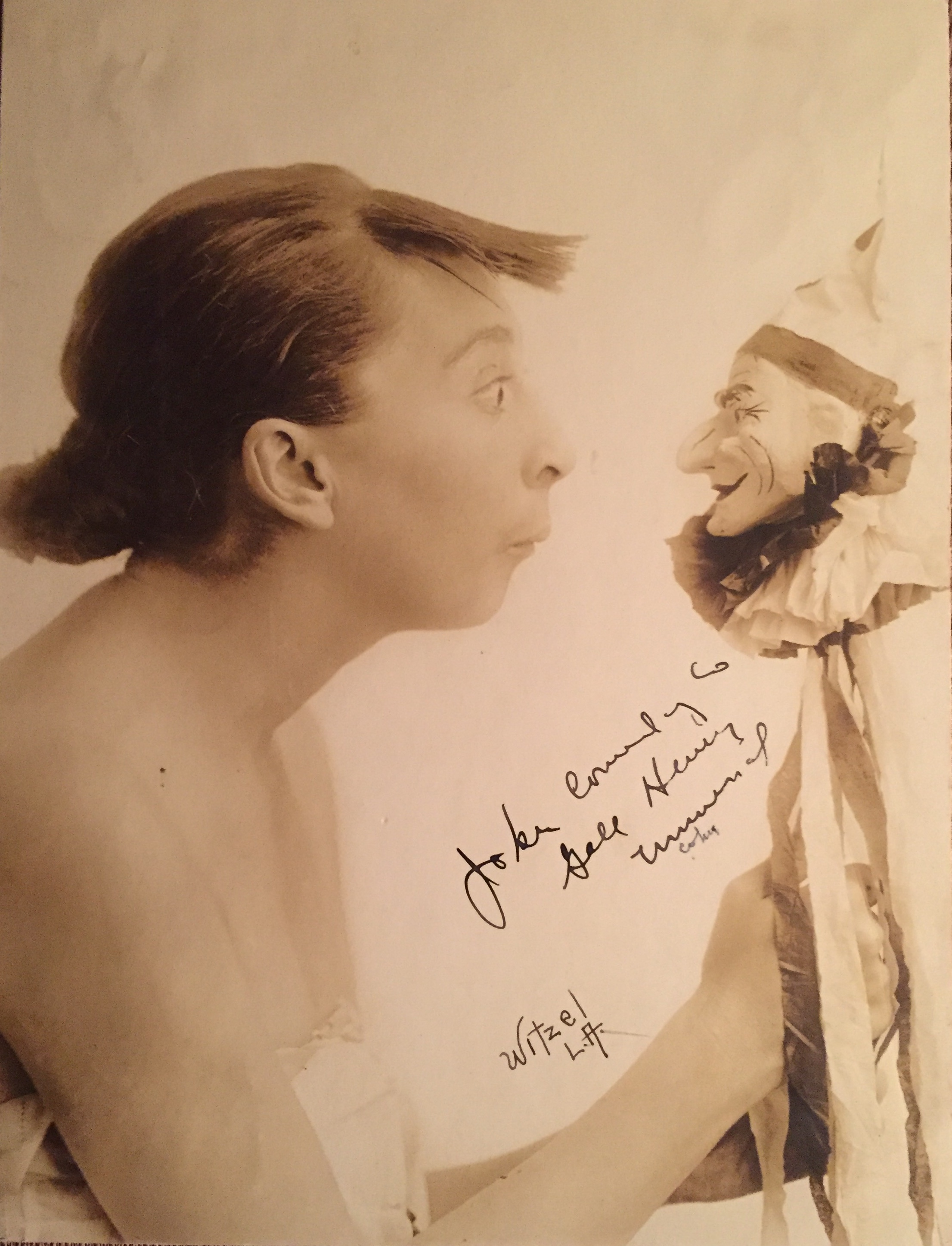
- 1915 publicity photo
- Born: Gale Preston Henry; April 15, 1893; Bear Valley, San Bernardino County, California, US
- Died: June 17, 1972 (aged 79); Palmdale, California, US
- Occupation: Actress
- Years active: 1914–1933
- Spouse(s): John Rockwell Trowbridge (m. 1913; div. 1915); Bruno J. Becker (m. 1916 – c. 1921); Henry R. East (m. 1925)

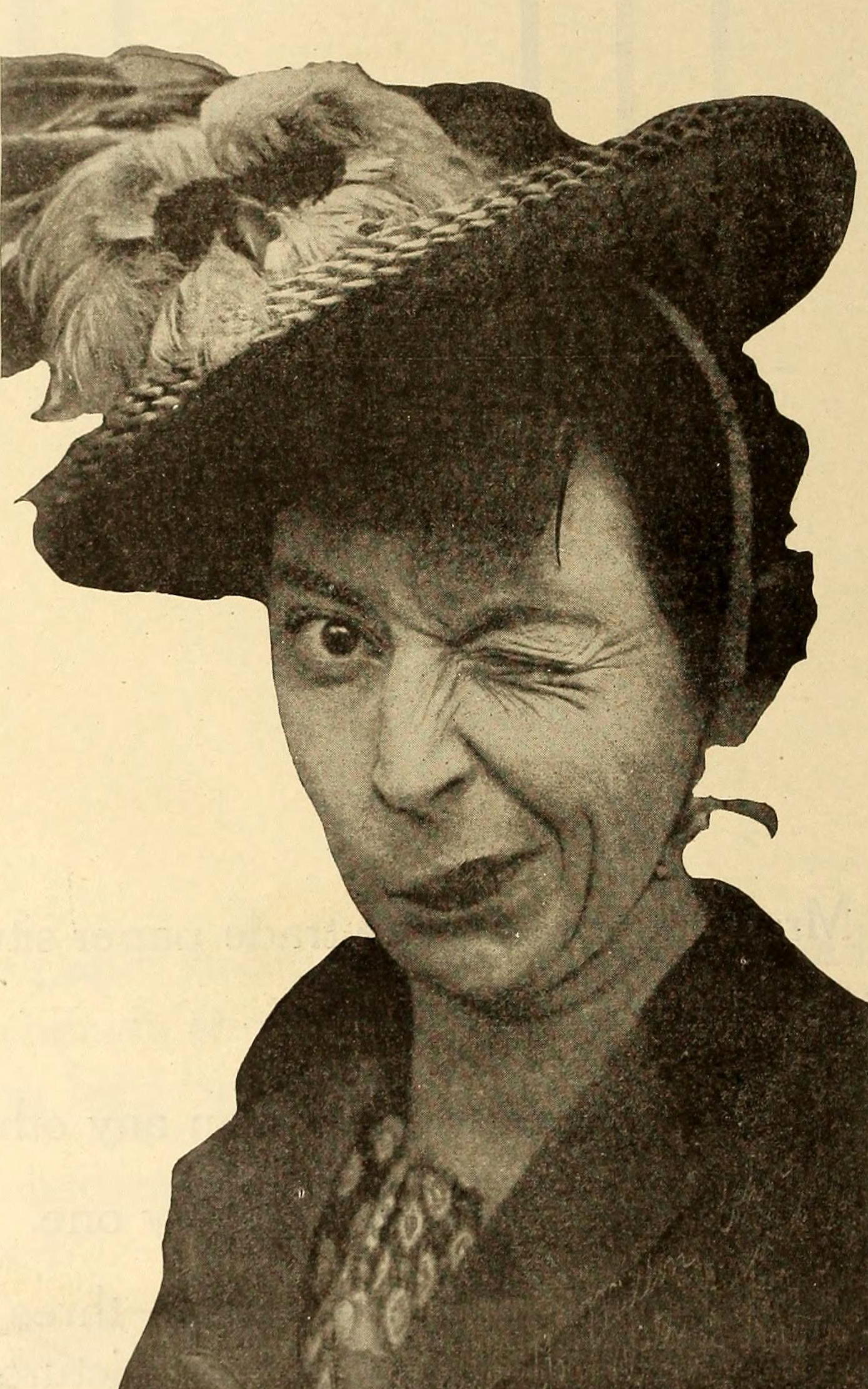
Gale Henry

Gale Preston Henry (April 15, 1893 – June 17, 1972) was an American film actress. A prominent comedian, she appeared in more than 230 films between 1914 and 1933.

== Early life and career ==
Born in Bear Valley in San Bernardino County, California, Henry was the daughter of Charles Herschel Henry and Mai Brantstetter.

In 1920, Henry owned a film production company that had a contract with Special Pictures Corporation calling for her to make 12 two-reel comedies per year.

In 1923, Gale Henry and Henry East began training dogs for motion pictures. Spread over two acres on the outer edge of Hollywood, the East kennels trained the most celebrated dog stars in the movies, including Skippy, the terrier who reached stardom as Asta in The Thin Man.

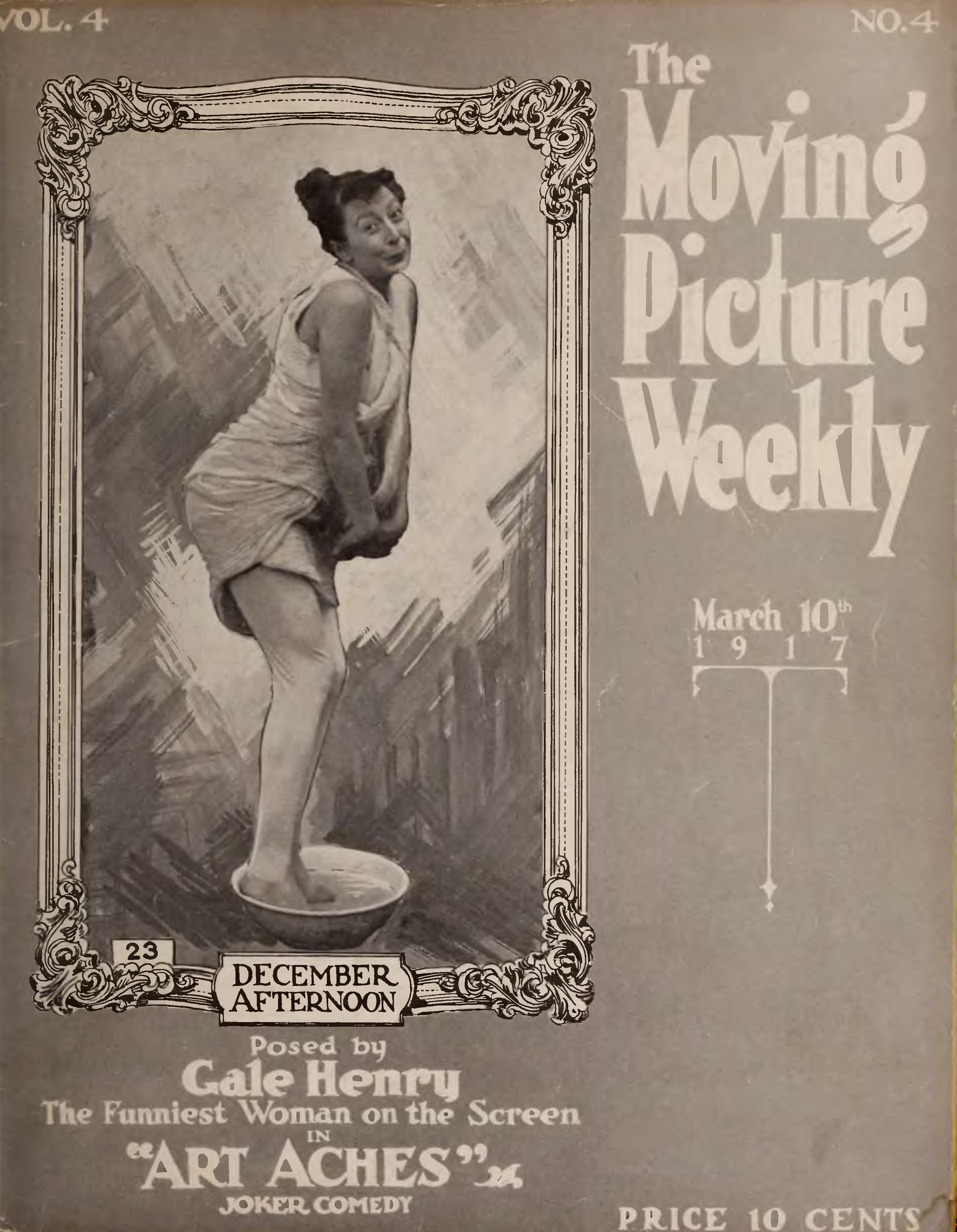
"Art Aches" movie ad "posed by Gale Henry" from, Moving Picture Weekly, 1917

== Personal life and death ==
Henry married at least four times. On February 28, 1913, she married John Rockwell Trowbridge; they divorced in November 1915. From December 1916 until at least January 1921, Henry's husband was her frequent collaborator, Bruno J. Becker, and from March 1925 until at least 1938, she was married to fellow animal trainer Henry East. She was married to Frederick Ernest Near from November 1939 until at least 1950, at which point they resided in Pearblossom, California.

In 1972, Henry died in Palmdale, California.

== Partial filmography ==
- Twelve "Lady Baffles and Detective Duck" short subjects, with Max Asher, produced by Pat Powers, 1915
- The Hunch (1921)
- Quincy Adams Sawyer (1922)
- Night Life in Hollywood (1922)
- Held to Answer (1923)
- Changing Husbands (1924)
- The Fire Patrol (1924)
- Merton of the Movies (1924)
- Open All Night (1924)
- Along Came Ruth (1924)
- All Wet (1924 short)
- New Lives for Old (1925)
- Youth's Gamble (1925)
- Declassee (1925)
- Mighty Like a Moose (1926 short)
- Two-Time Mama (1927)
- Love 'em and Weep (1927)
- Stranded (1927)
- The Love Doctor (1929)
- Darkened Rooms (1929)
