= Mischief Makers (TV series) =

American children's television series

Mischief Makers was a children's television series created by National Telepix that debuted on television syndication in 1960. The fifteen-minute series consisted of shortened Our Gang silent shorts that were originally released through Pathé, as well as various shorts from rival series including Mickey McGuire, Buster Brown, and others. Films from Hal Roach's all animal series the Dippy Doo Dads were also occasionally shown. The series ended production in 1961, but continued to be aired by certain local television stations well into the 1970s, and even during the 80's in Latin America and eastern Europe.

== Overview ==
The series mainly featured shorts from Hal Roach's Our Gang series, but shorts from other series were also sometimes shown. Each episode ran about fifteen minutes, with the featured short only being about twelve minutes in length (the shorts originally ran about twenty minutes long).

The shorts were always given a new, relatively simple title (i.e. Every Man For Himself became Shoeshine Shop). Most of what was deleted from the shorts were from the first half of the film, though some of the first half were retained in the episodes. The deleted footage sometimes wound up in other episodes, known as 'hybrid episodes'; these contained clips from more than one short. The original inter-titles were usually cut, though a few episodes did retain some of the titles. To compensate for the absence of the titles, most episodes were narrated by two kids who are identified as 'Bobby' and 'Bunny'. Bunny typically used the catchphrase "Skeedly Skeedly!". Carnival-like music (composed by Jack Saunders) and rather inappropriate sound effects were also added onto the films.

== Theme ==
The animated opening and closing theme featured a song titled "Hip, Hip, Hooray". It was written by Jack Saunders and Phyllis Brandell Saunders. An instrumental version of this song was among the several soundtrack tunes added onto the silent films.

The animation was produced by Gene Deitch. It featured four animated characters in front of a picket fence doing various activities. The animated characters were a fat kid with a beanie hat (probably meant to be Joe Cobb), a girl (probably Mary Kornman), a freckled-face boy (probably Mickey Daniels), and a dog with a ring around his eye (obviously meant to be Pete the Pup).

== Narration ==
Most episodes were narrated by two kids identified as 'Bobby' and 'Bunny'. The way the two interact with each other makes it seem plausible that the two are intended to be siblings, with Bobby being the older of the two. When narrating an episode, they typically leave very little space in between their comments. Today, most fans of the Our Gang series who have come across narrated Mischief Makers episodes find the narration to be rather irritating.

The writers for the narration sometimes gave rather odd names to some of the kids in the shorts. Others however were identified by their familiar names. Our Gang members Mickey, Mary, Ernie, Farina, Jackie, and Johnny all had their familiar names retained. Meanwhile, Joe Cobb was called 'Joey', Jack Davis was referred to as 'Rocky', and Jay R. Smith was called 'Freckles'.

== Episode list ==
Currently Incomplete

[*] indicates hybrid episode with more than one short used.

Episode Title	Original short
1. Galloping Ghosts	Shootin' Injuns
2. Treasure Hunt	Buried Treasure
3. Private Eyes	The Mysterious Mystery
4. Monkey Magic	Chicken Feed
5. Mary's Dream	Mary, Queen of Tots
6. Carnival Time	Boys Will Be Joys
7. Ride Em' Cowboy	War Feathers
8. All Aboard	Official Officers
9. Little Officers	The Sun Down Limited
10. Animal Hunters	It's a Bear
11. Movie Makers	Playin' Hookey
12. Runnaway Taxi	One Wild Ride
13. Big Fight	The Champeen
14. Warm Up	Olympic Games
15. The Big Fire	The Fourth Alarm
16. Fourth of July	The Glorious Fourth
17. A Double Birthday	Ten Years Old
18. A Crazy Dream	Seein' Things
19. Little Heroes	Young Sherlocks
20. The Rich Uncle	Baby Clothes
21. County Fair	The Big Show
22. Puppy Love	July Days
23. The Haunted House	Shivering Spooks
24. The Pirates	The Buccaneers
25. Rockaby Baby	Baby Brother
26. Spring Fever	Circus Fever
27. Little Jockeys	Derby Day
28. The Baby Show	Cradle Robbers
29. Little Red Schoolhouse	Commencement Day
30. Grandma Knows Best	Ask Grandma
31. Boarding School	Boys to Board
32. Shoeshine Shop	Every Man For Himself
33. A Birthday Present	Dog Days
34. Little Orphans	Bring Home the Turkey
35. The Barber Shop	Big Business
36. Show Business	Film Unknown
37. Dog Catchers	Love My Dog
38. The Secret Meeting	Lodge Night
39. Sweet Revenge	Tired Business Men
40. The Big Adventure	The Big Town
41. Operation: Tonsills!	No Noise
42. The Lucky Shoemaker	The Cobbler
43. The Outing	One Terrible Day
44. The Beauty Parlor	The Love Bug
45. The Music Lesson	Saturday Morning
46. The Flea Circus	Thundering Fleas
47. The Big Bully	Telling Whoppers
48. A Roamin' Holiday	Seeing the World
49. Little Firemen	Fire Fighters
50. The Little League	Giants vs. Yanks
51. Mickey’s New Home	High Society
52. The Big Switch	Fast Company
53. Hollywood U.S.A.	Dogs of War; Playin' Hookey
54. Farina’s Friend	Monkey Business
55. Happy Holiday	Good Cheer
56. Battleground	Dogs of War
57. Stage Struck	Better Movies
58. The Cure	Tire Trouble
59. Sparky the Star	Film Unknown
60. The Brave Chimp	Film Unknown
61. The Rival Clinic	No Noise; Unknown Hey Fellas short
62. The Rival Circus	Film Unknown
63. Sparky Tags Along	Film Unknown
64. Quiet Sunday	Sunday Calm
65. Railroad Rivals	Film Unknown
66. The School Play	Stage Fright
67. Sparky's Picnic	Buster's Picnic
68. Ernie’s Adventure*	High Tide (Sunshine Sammy and George Rowe short); Young Sherlocks
69. Wild Northwest	Film Unknown
70. Monkey Mischief	Film Unknown
71. The Monkey Story	Film Unknown
72. An Average Day*	Playin' Hookey; Telling Whoppers; Love My Dog; Ten Years Old
73. Sparky Rides High	Film Unknown
74. Sparky at School	Film Unknown
75. Summer Daze	Knockout Buster
76. Sparky and the Tutor	Buster's Skyrocket (1926 film)
77. Football Rivals	Film Unknown
78. Back to School	Mickey in School (Mickey McGuire short)
79. Let Me Dream	Film Unknown
80. Play Ball!*	Fast Company; The Cobbler (film); Official Officers; The Champeen; High Society

Episode production numbers for the following titles are still unknown.

- Sparky the Star
- Summer Daze (Buster Brown short)
- Sparky at School (Buster Brown short)
- Monkey Mischief
- Rival Circus
- The Monkey Story

== Comedy Capers ==
After the cancellation of Mischief Makers, National Telepix produced Comedy Capers, a spin-off series consisting of various comedy films produced by Hal Roach and Mack Sennett. Top billing for the series went to Laurel and Hardy (even though very few of their films as a team were shown), Ben Turpin, Harry Langdon, Billy Bevan, and The Keystone Cops. Other films shown starred Will Rogers, Charley Chase, Snub Pollard, Billy West, Larry Semon, Clyde Cook, and Mabel Normand, among others.

The beginning to the opening theme immediately recognized the series as a spin-off of Mischief Makers, as the singers of the theme song mention "The Mischief Makers present...". Although actual Our Gang shorts were not featured on Comedy Capers, the opening theme featured clips from Our Gang shorts Official Officers and Playin' Hookey.
