= Back Stage (1923 film) =

1923 film

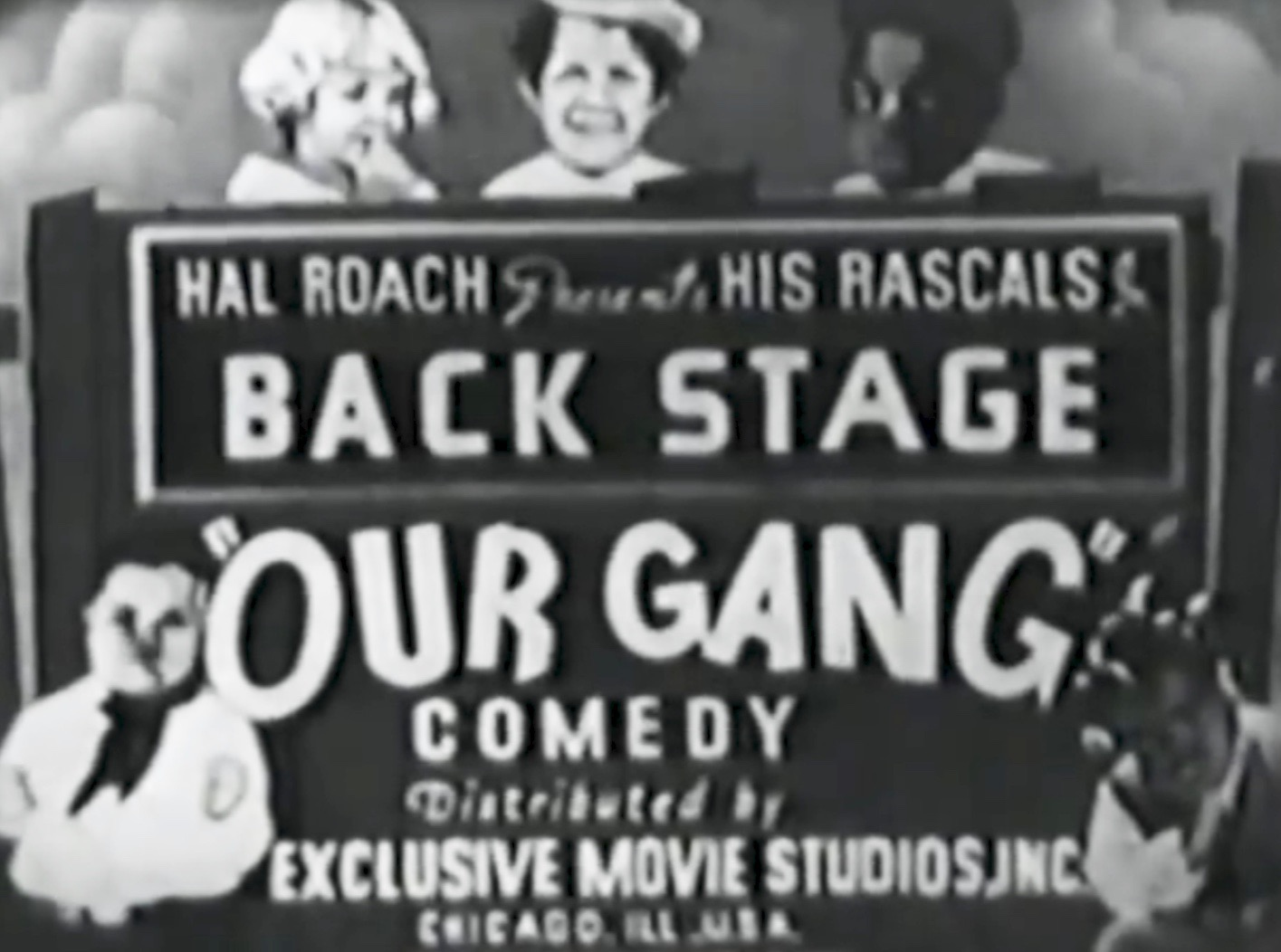
- Title card
- Directed by: Robert F. McGowan
- Written by: Hal Roach; H. M. Walker
- Produced by: Hal Roach
- Starring: Joe Cobb; Jackie Condon; Mickey Daniels; Jack Davis; Allen "Farina" Hoskins; Ernie "Sunshine Sammy" Morrison; Andy Samuel; James W. Cobb; Richard Daniels; Dick Gilbert; William Gillespie; Wallace Howe; Robert F. McGowan; Charley Young
- Distributed by: Pathé Exchange
- Release date: June 3, 1923
- Running time: 20 minutes
- Country: United States
- Language: Silent (English intertitles)

Back Stage is a 1923 silent Our Gang silent short subject comedy film directed by Robert F. McGowan, that is the 13th entry to be released.

== Plot ==
The gang meets up with the head of a vaudeville troupe, who enlist them to help him out when his co-stars have abandoned him. They manage to make a complete wreck of the act, and Jack and Joe's bugs get loose in the auditorium, putting the audience into an itching frenzy.

== Cast ==
=== The Gang ===
- Joe Cobb as Joe
- Jackie Condon as Jackie
- Mickey Daniels as Mickey
- Jack Davis as Jack
- Allen "Farina" Hoskins as Farina
- Ernie "Sunshine Sammy" Morrison as Ernie
- Andy Samuel as Andy
- Dinah the Mule as Herself

=== Additional cast ===
- Ivadell Carter as Pansy
- James W. Cobb as Audience member disrupted by Farina
- Richard Daniels as Audience member slapping spider
- William Gillespie as Head of the theater troupe
- Wallace Howe as Theater manager
- Dick Gilbert as Outside worker
- Charley Young as Outside worker
- Robert F. McGowan as Man in front of the bus

== Production ==
This was the 13th and final film to be released in the original film series contract. Another contract was written and accepted bringing in more films, starting with Dogs of War.

== Sequence ==
- 012. Giants vs. Yanks (1923) – proceeds
- 014. Dogs of War (1923) – succeeds
