= The Buccaneers (film) =

1924 film

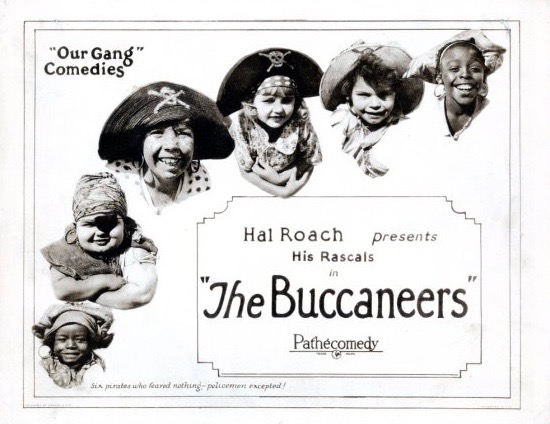
- Lobby card
- Directed by: Robert F. McGowan; Mark Goldaine
- Written by: Hal Roach; H. M. Walker
- Produced by: Hal Roach
- Starring: Joe Cobb; Jackie Condon; Mickey Daniels; Allen Hoskins; Mary Kornman; Ernie Morrison; Andy Samuel; Allen Cavan; Dick Gilbert; Earl Mohan "Tonnage" Martin Wolfkeil
- Distributed by: Pathé Exchange
- Release date: March 9, 1924
- Running time: 19:49
- Country: United States
- Language: Silent (English intertitles)

The Buccaneers is a 1924 American short silent comedy film directed by Robert F. McGowan. It was the 23rd Our Gang short subject to be released.

== Plot ==
The gang decides to be pirates and build a boat, which sinks immediately upon launching. The boys then blame Mary because she is a girl. Friendly sea captain, Capt. Whelan, tells her she can play pirate on his fishing boat and the boys join her. Their boat accidentally gets set free of her moorings and the gang has adventures on the “high seas” of the harbor, until they are boarded by the U.S. Navy battleship California.

== Production notes ==
When the silent Pathé Our Gang comedies were syndicated for television as "The Mischief Makers" in 1960, The Buccaneers was retitled The Pirates.

== Cast ==
=== The Gang ===
- Joe Cobb as Joe
- Jackie Condon as Jackie
- Mickey Daniels as Mickey
- Allen Hoskins as Farina
- Mary Kornman as Mary
- Ernie Morrison as Sunshine Sammy
- Andy Samuel as Andy

=== Additional cast ===
- Allen Cavan as Capt. Whelan
- Dick Gilbert as police officer
- Earl Mohan as naval officer
- "Tonnage" Martin Wolfkeil as fat sailor

== See also ==
- Our Gang filmography
