= Jubilo, Jr. =

1924 film

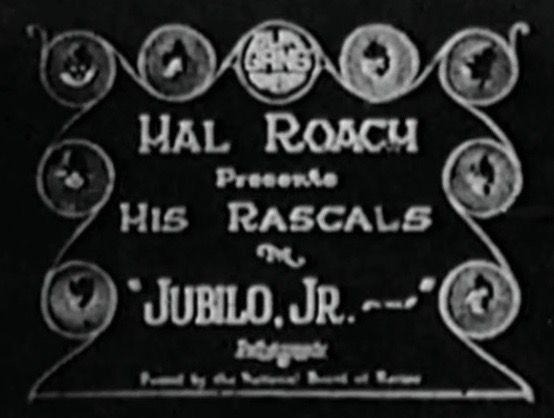
- Title card
- Directed by: Robert F. McGowan
- Written by: Frank Capra; Hal Roach; H. M. Walker
- Produced by: Hal Roach
- Starring: Mickey Daniels; Joe Cobb; Jackie Condon; Allen Hoskins; Mary Kornman; Andy Samuel; Dick Henchen; Pal the Dog; Will Rogers; Lassie Lou Ahern; Charley Chase; Lyle Tayo
- Cinematography: Robert Doran; Art Lloyd
- Distributed by: Pathé Exchange
- Release date: June 29, 1924
- Running time: 19:31
- Country: United States
- Language: Silent (English intertitles)

Jubilo, Jr. is a 1924 short silent comedy film directed by Robert F. McGowan. It was the 27th Our Gang short subject to be released.

== Plot ==
A hobo tells of his adventure as a child when he tried to raise the money to buy his mother a hat for her birthday.

== Notes ==
- Jubilo, Jr. would be remade in 1932 as Birthday Blues.
- The title references Rogers' 1919 film Jubilo.
- Though never included in the original television package of Our Gang silents, this film did appear in the TV series Silents Please.
- The grocer is played by Mickey Daniels’ father Richard Daniels.
- About thirty seconds of unused footage was used in the later Our Gang film Boys Will Be Joys.

== Cast ==
=== The Gang ===
- Mickey Daniels as Young Jubilo
- Joe Cobb as Joe
- Jackie Condon as Jackie
- Allen Hoskins as Farina
- Mary Kornman as Mary
- Andy Samuel - Andy / Charlie Chaplin
- Dick Henchen as Dick
- Pal the Dog as Pal

=== Additional cast ===
- Will Rogers as Jubilo / Himself
- Lassie Lou Ahern as Circus Performer
- Allan Cavan as Hat vendor
- Charley Chase as Director
- Richard Daniels as Grocer
- Otto Himm as Photographer
- Lyle Tayo as Mother
- Leo Willis as Tramp pal of Jubilo
- Noah Young as Emil, Jubilo's father
- Joy Winthrop as Extra outside church
- Jerry McGowan
- Roberta McGowan

== See also ==
- Our Gang filmography
