= Lodge Night =

1923 film

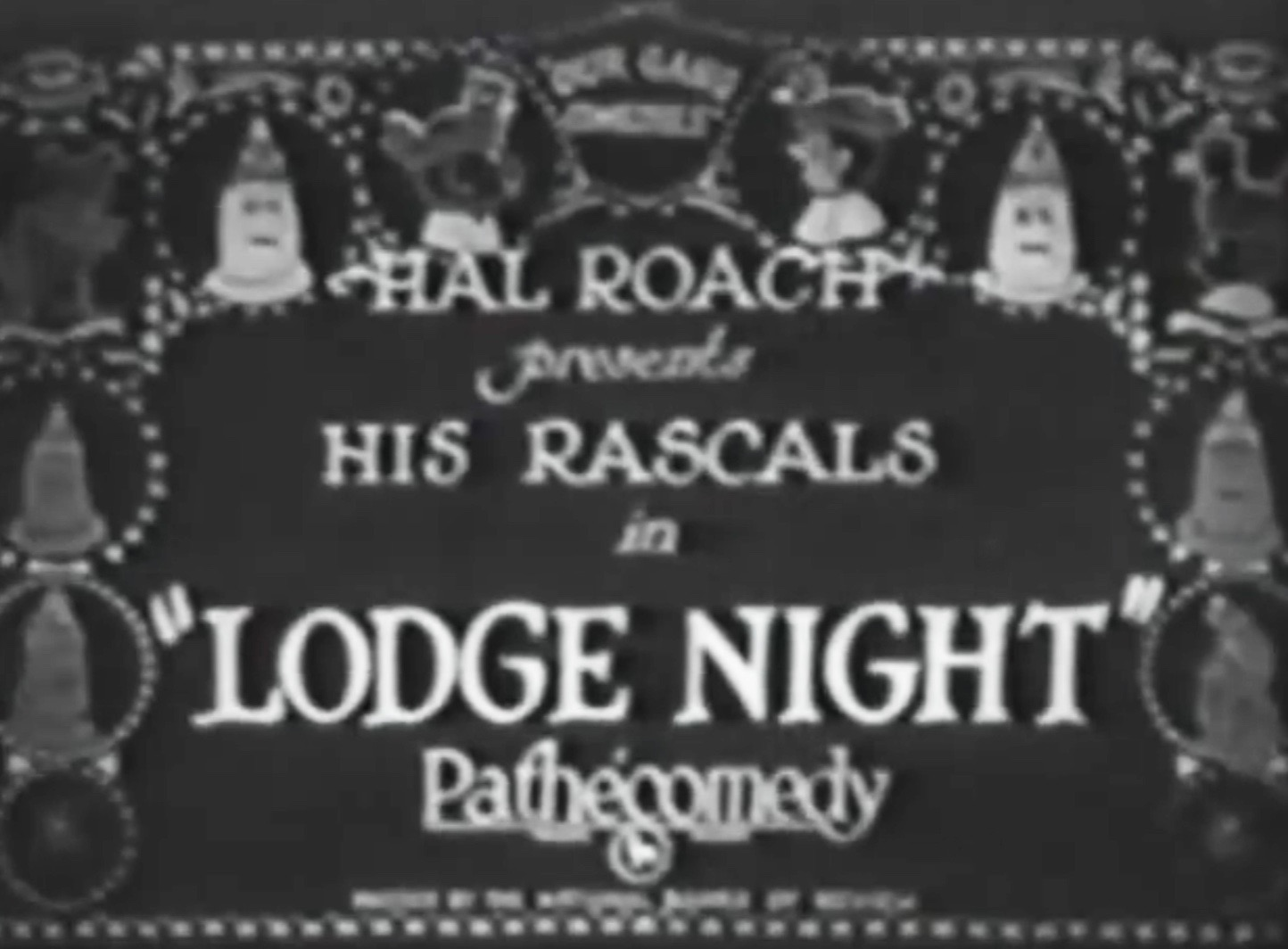
- Directed by: Robert F. McGowan
- Written by: Hal Roach; H. M. Walker
- Produced by: Hal Roach
- Starring: Joe Cobb; Jackie Condon; Mickey Daniels; Jack Davis; Allen Hoskins; Mary Kornman; Ernest Morrison; Elmo Billings; Andy Samuel; Richard Billings; George Warde; Charles Stevenson
- Distributed by: Pathé Exchange
- Release date: July 29, 1923
- Running time: 29:28
- Country: United States
- Languages: Silent film English intertitles

Lodge Night is the 15th Our Gang short subject comedy to be released. The Our Gang series (later known as "The Little Rascals") was created by Hal Roach in 1922, and continued production until 1944.

== Synopsis ==
Joe arrives as the new boy in school, and the boys decide to initiate him into their secret club, the Cluck Cluck Klams. During the proceedings, a couple of auto thieves break into the barn, and when they make their getaway, Farina and Jackie are in the back seat.

== Cast ==
=== The Gang ===
- Joe Cobb — Joe
- Jackie Condon — Jackie
- Mickey Daniels — Mickey
- Jack Davis — Jack
- Allen Hoskins — Farina
- Mary Kornman — Mary
- Ernest Morrison — Ernie
- Elmo Billings — Elmo
- Andy Samuel — Andy
- Richard Billings — Richard
- George Warde — Freckles

=== Additional cast ===
- Julia Brown — school girl
- Ivadell Carter — school girl
- Mary Murphy — school girl
- Richard Daniels — Mickey and Jackie's father
- Fanny Kelly — Mickey and Jackie's mother
- Ernie Morrison Sr. — Prof. T. Jefferson Culpepper
- Charles Stevenson — car thief
- Roy Brooks — car thief

== See also ==
- Our Gang filmography
