= The Mysterious Mystery! =

1924 film

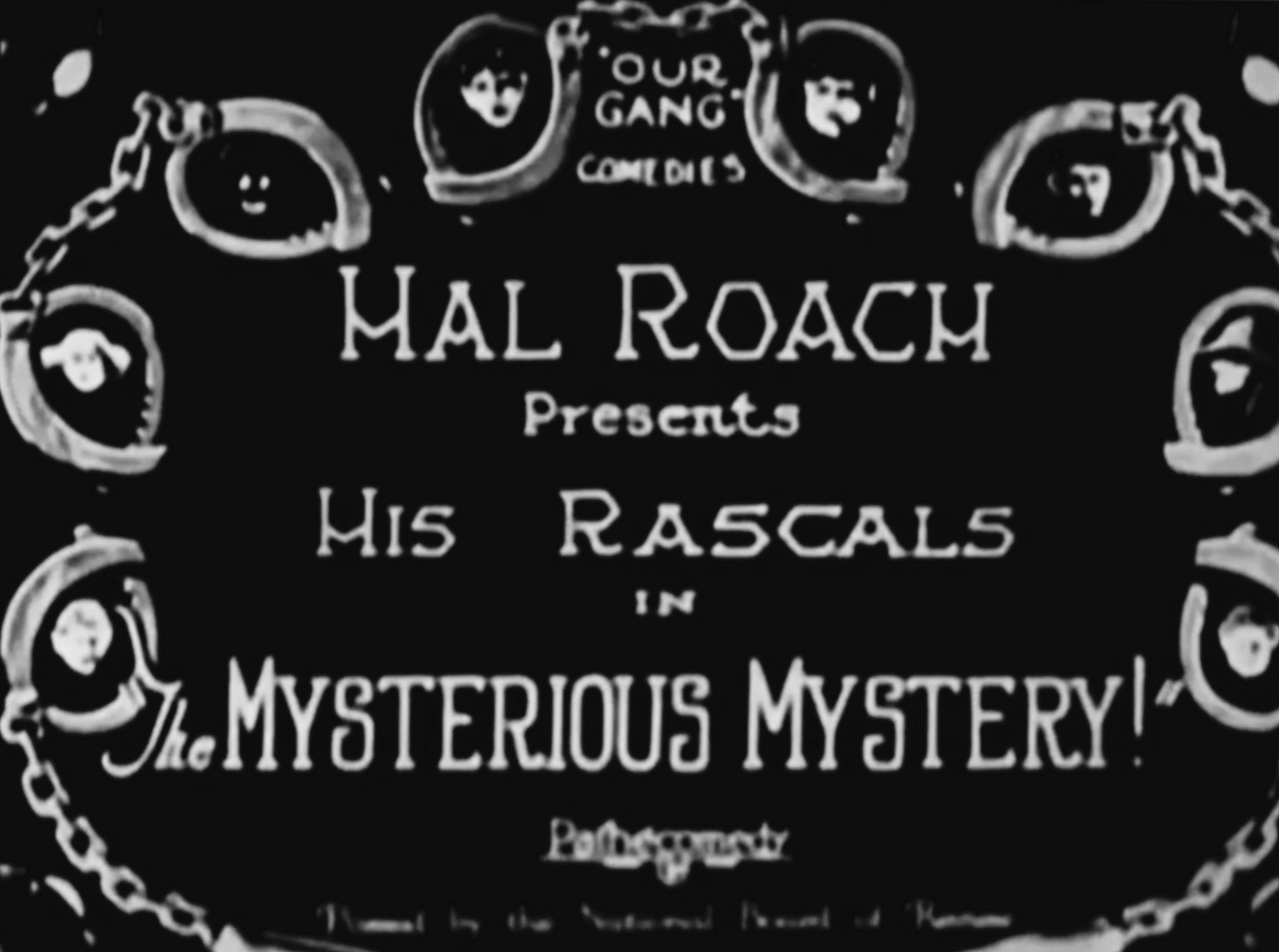
- Directed by: Robert F. McGowan
- Written by: Hal Roach; H. M. Walker
- Produced by: Hal Roach
- Starring: Mickey Daniels; Joe Cobb; Jackie Condon; Allen Hoskins; Eugene Jackson; Andy Samuel; Sonny Loy; Charles A. Bachman; Allan Cavan; William Gillespie; Sam Lufkin; Dick Gilbert
- Cinematography: Art Lloyd
- Edited by: T. J. Crizer
- Distributed by: Pathé Exchange
- Release date: December 14, 1924
- Running time: 19:47
- Country: United States
- Languages: Silent; English intertitles

The Mysterious Mystery! is a 1924 short silent comedy film directed by Robert F. McGowan. It was the 33rd Our Gang short subject to be released.

== Plot ==
Little Adelbert, son of a wealthy family, is kidnapped and held for ransom. The gang, led by Mickey, are quickly on the case. Mistaking Detective Jinks as a "suspeck," the gang captures him and notifies the police, who recognize the detective and release him.

One of the kidnappers gives the gang a dollar to deliver a package to Mr. Wallingford: A ransom note attached to a pigeon. The note tells the Wallingfords to attach five $1,000 bills to the pigeon, but the kids accidentally let the pigeon escape. Riding with Mr. Wallingford, the gang goes to an airfield and hides from Det. Jinks in a plane that Mr. Wallingford hires to follow the pigeon. During the flight the pigeon lands on the wing and Joe wing walks to retrieve the bird, but drops it. The pilot tries to rescue Joe, but falls (safely into a body of water), leaving Mickey to fly the plane.

Mickey, along with Joe and Farina, manages to follow the pigeon who returns to the barn where Little Adelbert is being held. With Mr. Wallingford and Det. Jinks following the plane, Mickey crashes into the barn and the kidnappers are pinned underneath the rubble. Mickey handcuffs the crooks as Mr. Wallingford arrives, who tells Det. Jinks to make sure the boys get the cash reward for capturing the kidnappers. As Mr. Wallingford hugs Adelbert, the gang runs away with Det. Jinks in pursuit, waving the reward money at them.

== Production notes ==
The Mysterious Mystery! marks the first appearance of Eugene "Pineapple" Jackson in an Our Gang comedy. Mary Kornman does not appear.

== Cast ==
=== The Gang ===
- Joe Cobb – Joe
- Mickey Daniels – Mickey
- Allen Hoskins – Farina
- Eugene Jackson – Snowball
- Andy Samuel – Andy
- Sonny Loy – Sing Joy
- Jackie Condon – Little Adelbert Wallingford

=== Additional cast ===
- Charles A. Bachman – Det. Jinks
- Allan Cavan – Adelbert's grandfather
- Dick Gilbert – Henchman
- William Gillespie – Mr. Wallingford
- Sam Lufkin – Henchman
- Charley Young – Butler
