= Seein' Things (1924 film) =

1924 film

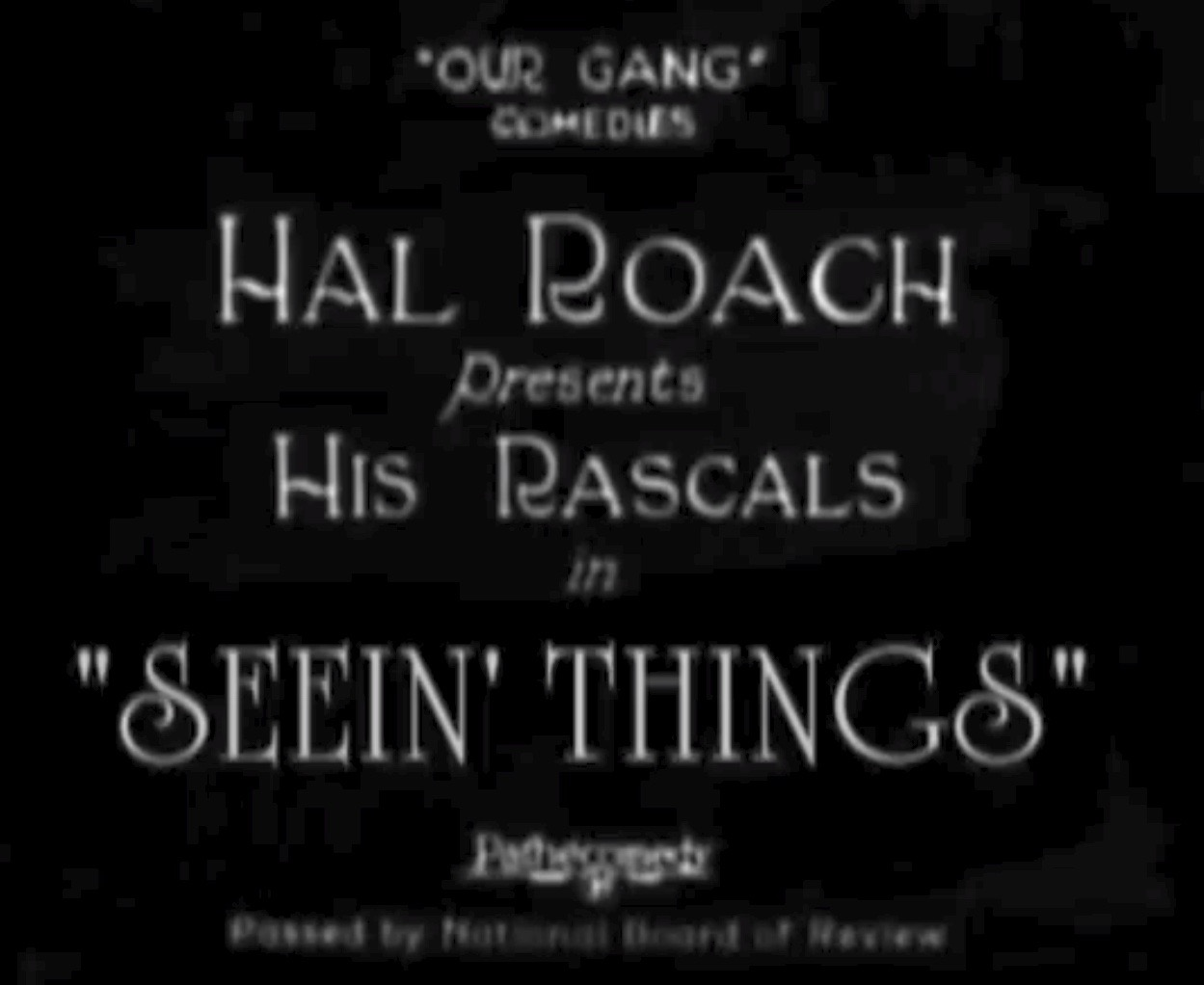
- Title card
- Directed by: Robert F. McGowan
- Written by: Hal Roach; H. M. Walker
- Produced by: Hal Roach
- Starring: Joe Cobb; Jackie Condon; Mickey Daniels; Allen Hoskins; Mary Kornman; Ernie Morrison; Andy Samuel; Dorothy Morrison; Joseph Morrison; S. D. Wilcox
- Cinematography: Harry W. Gerstad
- Distributed by: Pathé Exchange
- Release date: April 6, 1924
- Running time: 22:44
- Country: United States
- Language: Silent (English intertitles)

Seein' Things is a 1924 American short silent comedy film directed by Robert F. McGowan. It was the 24th Our Gang short subject to be released.

== Plot ==
Farina has nightmares after ruining the gang's barbecue and then gorging herself on several fried chickens.

== Cast ==
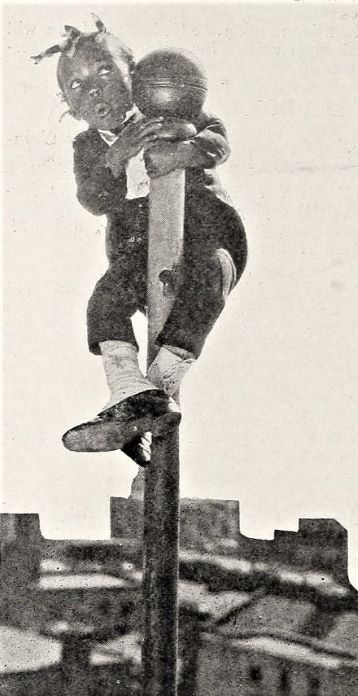
Still with Hoskins from a 1924 magazine

=== The Gang ===
- Joe Cobb as Joe
- Jackie Condon as Jackie
- Mickey Daniels as Mickey
- Allen Hoskins as Farina
- Mary Kornman as Mary
- Ernie Morrison as Sunshine Sammy
- Andy Samuel as Andy

=== Additional cast ===
- Dorothy Morrison as girl in dream
- Joseph Morrison as 'Two-Razor' Johnson
- S. D. Wilcox as police officer

== Production notes ==
When the silent Pathé Our Gang comedies were syndicated for television as "The Mischief Makers" in 1960, Seein' Things was retitled A Crazy Dream. Two-thirds of the original film was included.

Before the dream sequence, Farina is dressed as a girl. During the dream sequence, he is a boy.

With Jack Davis' departure from the cast, Andy Samuel begins to make more appearances in Our Gang.

Ernie Morrison’s sister, Dorothy Morrison, makes a brief appearance in this film.

== See also ==
- Our Gang filmography
