= Every Man for Himself (1924 film) =

1924 film

Every Man For Himself
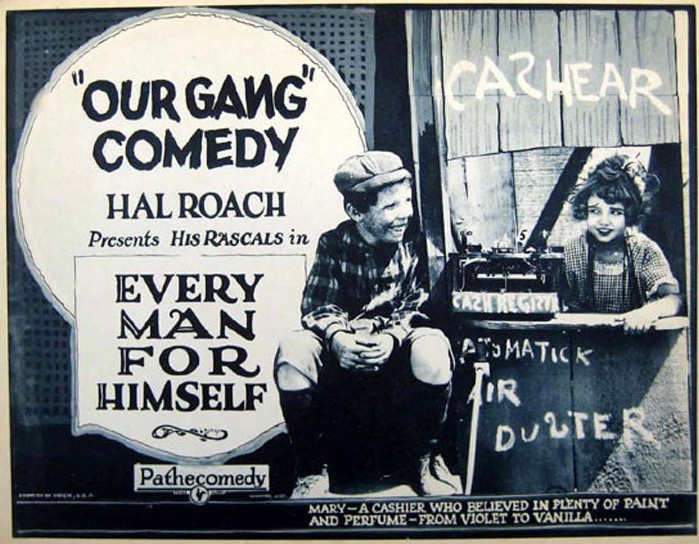
- Directed by: Robert F. McGowan
- Written by: Frank Capra; Hal Roach; H. M. Walker
- Produced by: Hal Roach
- Starring: Joe Cobb; Jackie Condon; Allen Hoskins; Andy Samuel; Mickey Daniels; Mary Kornman; Sonny Loy; Pal the Dog; Charles DeBriac; Monty O'Grady; Ray DeBriac; Gabe Saienz; George B. French; Dick Gilbert; William Gillespie; Helen Gilmore; Martha Sleeper
- Edited by: T. J. Crizer
- Distributed by: Pathé Exchange
- Release date: October 19, 1924
- Running time: 20 minutes
- Country: United States
- Languages: Silent; English intertitles

Every Man For Himself is a 1924 short silent comedy film directed by Robert F. McGowan. It was the 31st Our Gang short subject to be released.

== Plot ==
The Gang is running a combination boxing club and (wireless) shoeshine business. After the boxing gloves owner takes his gloves home, the gym rent is due, and with some customer service mistakes in the shoeshine stand, the gang needs to raise money. They drum up business by spraying paint on men's shoes and cleaning them until a policeman catches them. One of the marks proves to be Jimbo Johnson, the "price" fighter, who bails the gang out.

The identical twin brothers "Scrappy" and "Sissy" then move into the neighborhood. Mickey tries to establish the social pecking order by fighting, but the boys keep switching places and confuse Mickey and the gang.

== Cast ==
=== The Gang ===
- Joe Cobb — Joe
- Jackie Condon — Jackie
- Allen Hoskins — Farina
- Andy Samuel — Andy
- Mickey Daniels — Mickey
- Mary Kornman — Mary
- Sonny Loy — Sing Joy
- Pal the Dog — Himself

=== Additional cast ===
- Charles and Ray DeBriac — Scrappy and Sissy
- Monty O'Grady — Monty
- Gabe Saienz — Toughey
- George B. French – inebriated shoeshine customer
- Dick Gilbert – man whose shoes get sprayed
- William Gillespie — pedestrian
- Helen Gilmore — pedestrian
- Clara Guiol — bookworm
- Earl Mohan – friend of boxer
- Rolfe Sedan – man seated at shoeshine stand
- Martha Sleeper – lady with rings around eyes
