= Your Own Back Yard =

1925 film

- Directed by: Robert F. McGowan
- Written by: Hal Roach; H. M. Walker
- Produced by: Hal Roach; F. Richard Jones
- Edited by: Richard C. Currier
- Distributed by: Pathé Exchange
- Release date: September 27, 1925
- Running time: 20 minutes
- Country: United States
- Language: Silent with English intertitles

Your Own Back Yard is a 1925 American short silent comedy film, the 43rd in the Our Gang series, directed by Robert F. McGowan. Prints of this film exist.

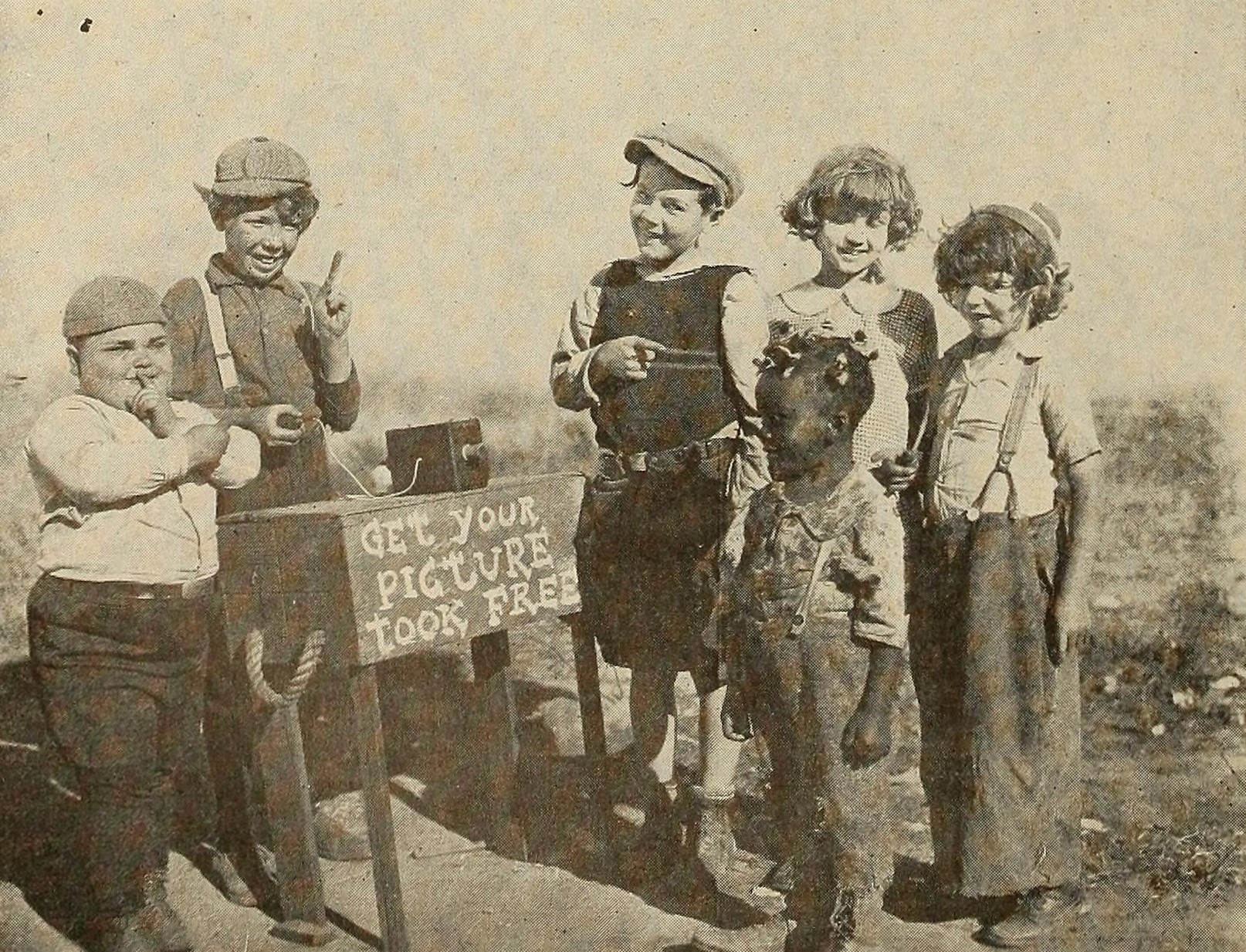
The gang gathers around in Your Own Back Yard.

== Cast ==
=== The Gang ===
- Allen Hoskins - Farina
- Joe Cobb - Joe
- Jackie Condon - Jackie
- Mickey Daniels - Mickey
- Johnny Downs - Johnny
- Mary Kornman - Mary

=== Additional cast ===
- Harry Bowen - Donor
- William Gillespie - Man in quarrelsome couple
- Charles Oelze - Man with samples
- Fay Wray - Woman in quarrelsome couple
- Pal the Dog as himself
- Dinah the Mule as herself

== See also ==
- Our Gang filmography
