= Sunday Calm =

1923 film

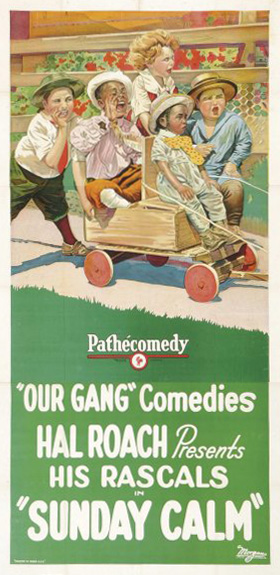
- Directed by: Robert F. McGowan
- Written by: Hal Roach; H. M. Walker
- Produced by: Hal Roach
- Starring: Joe Cobb; Jackie Condon; Mickey Daniels; Jack Davis; Allen Hoskins; Ernest Morrison; Leona Levin; Richard Daniels; Clara Guiol; Helen Gilmore
- Distributed by: Pathé Exchange
- Release date: December 16, 1923
- Running time: 25:18
- Country: United States
- Languages: Silent; English intertitles

Sunday Calm is a 1923 short silent comedy film directed by Robert F. McGowan. It was the 20th Our Gang short subject to be released.

== Plot ==
The gang travels by wagon to go on a picnic with their families. After the cart loses a wheel, the parents replace it, only to be left behind when the horse bolts with the wagon and the gang. Arriving in the woods, the gang run wild until their parents catch up with them. A storm interrupts the picnic, after which the horse bolts again, this time leaving everybody behind.

== Production notes ==
Mary Kornman does not appear.

The plot device of a family embarking on a Sunday picnic was reused in Laurel and Hardy's 1929 film Perfect Day.

== Cast ==
=== The Gang ===
- Joe Cobb — Joe Tucker
- Jackie Condon — Jackie Tucker
- Mickey Daniels — Mickey McTeeter
- Jack Davis — Jack Tucker
- Allen Hoskins — Farina
- Ernest Morrison — Ernie
- Leona Levin — Mickey's sister

=== Additional cast ===
- Richard Daniels — Mr. Tucker
- Clara Guiol — Mrs. Tucker
- Helen Gilmore — Mrs. McTeeter
