= Commencement Day =

1924 film

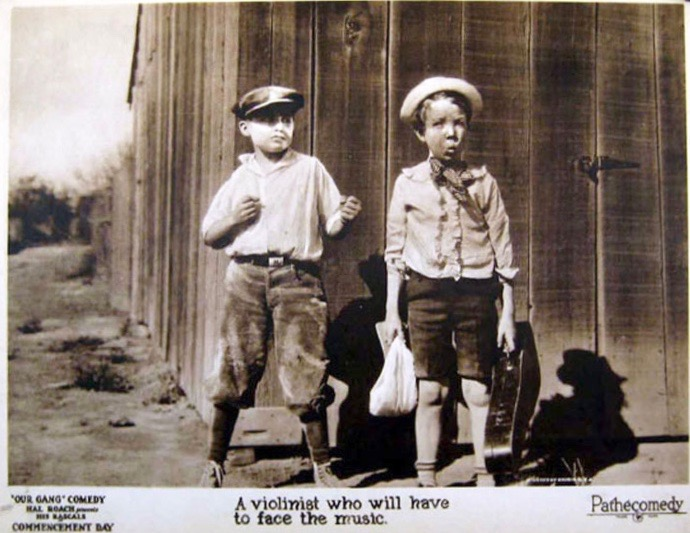
- Directed by: Robert F. McGowan; Mark Goldaine
- Written by: Hal Roach; H. M. Walker
- Produced by: Hal Roach
- Starring: Joe Cobb; Jackie Condon; Mickey Daniels; Allen Hoskins; Mary Kornman; Ernie Morrison; Jannie Hoskins; Gabe Saienz; Andy Samuel; Dinah the Mule; Gus Leonard; Lyle Tayo; Dorothy Vernon
- Distributed by: Pathé Exchange
- Release date: May 4, 1924
- Running time: 17:30
- Country: United States
- Languages: Silent; English intertitles

Commencement Day is a 1924 short silent comedy film directed by Robert F. McGowan. It was the 25th Our Gang short subject to be released.

== Plot ==
Mickey gets in a fight with another boy over Mary. The parents show up for Commencement Day at school and listen to the kids recite and play their musical instruments. Jackie puts pepper in Joe's saxophone. Mickey loses his frog. Farina falls in a well. While the parents are out rescuing Farina, the kids get in a food fight.

== Production notes ==
When the silent Pathé Our Gang comedies were syndicated for television as "The Mischief Makers" in 1960, Commencement Day was retitled Little Red Schoolhouse. This film was also made available for the 16mm home movie market as Graduation Day.

== Cast ==
=== The Gang ===
- Joe Cobb as Joe
- Jackie Condon as Jackie
- Mickey Daniels as Mickey
- Allen Hoskins as Farina
- Mary Kornman as Mary
- Ernie Morrison as Sunshine Sammy
- Jannie Hoskins as Mango
- Dinah the Mule as herself

=== Additional cast ===
- Gabe Saienz as Snoozer, the bully
- Andy Samuel as Andy
- George B. French as school teacher
- Helen Gilmore as Joe's mother
- Gus Leonard as Parent with ear-horn
- Lyle Tayo as Mary's mother
- Dorothy Vernon as Mickey's mother
- Charley Young as Parent

== See also ==
- Our Gang filmography
