= Boys Will Be Joys =

1925 film

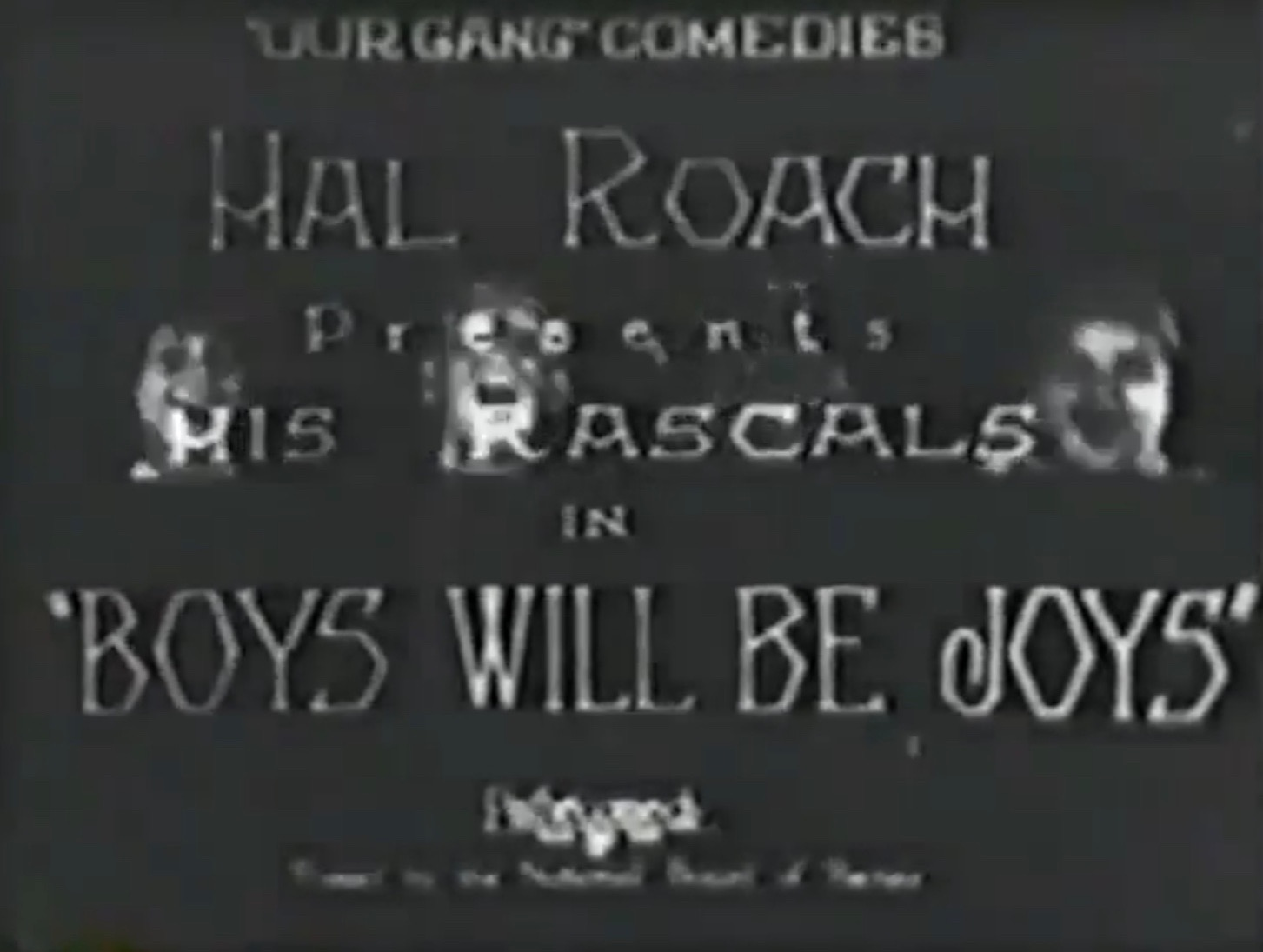
- Directed by: Robert F. McGowan
- Written by: Hal Roach; H. M. Walker
- Produced by: Hal Roach; F. Richard Jones
- Starring: Joe Cobb; Jackie Condon; Mickey Daniels; Johnny Downs; Allen Hoskins; Mary Kornman; Jannie Hoskins; Gabe Saienz; Jay R. Smith; Pal the Dog
- Cinematography: Art Lloyd
- Edited by: Richard C. Currier
- Distributed by: Pathé Exchange
- Release date: July 26, 1925
- Running time: 18:34
- Country: United States
- Language: Silent with English intertitles

Boys Will Be Joys is a 1925 American short silent comedy film, the 41st in the Our Gang series, directed by Robert F. McGowan.

== Cast ==
=== The Gang ===
- Joe Cobb as Joe
- Jackie Condon as Jackie
- Mickey Daniels as Mickey
- Johnny Downs as Johnny
- Allen Hoskins as Farina
- Mary Kornman as Mary
- Jannie Hoskins as Mango
- Pal the Dog as himself

=== Additional cast ===
- Gabe Saienz as Kid
- Jay R. Smith in a bit part
- Charles A. Bachman as Surveyor
- Allan Cavan as Member of Board of Directors
- George B. French as Member of Board of Directors
- William Gillespie as Member of Board of Directors
- William Orlamond as Member of Board of Directors
- Paul Weigel as Henry Mills, board chairman
- Charley Young as Member of Board of Directors
- Noah Young as Officer
- Andy Samuel (unconfirmed)
