= The Big Show (1923 film) =

1923 film

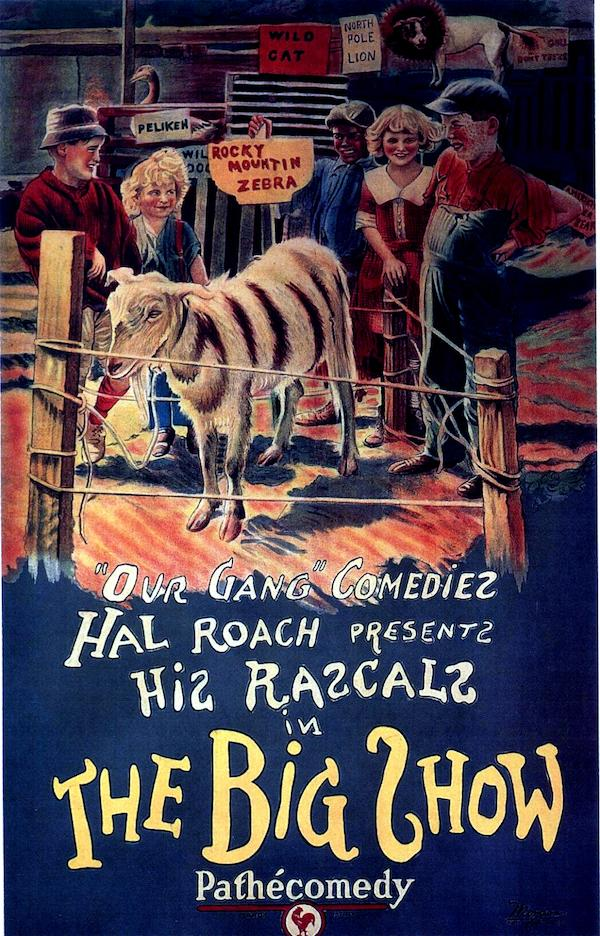
- Directed by: Robert F. McGowan
- Written by: Hal Roach; H. M. Walker
- Produced by: Hal Roach
- Starring: Joe Cobb; Jackie Condon; Mickey Daniels; Jack Davis; Allen Hoskins; Mary Kornman; Ernie Morrison; Andy Samuel; Dick Gilbert; Billy Lord; Lincoln Stedman
- Cinematography: Len Powers
- Distributed by: Pathé
- Release date: February 25, 1923
- Running time: 20 minutes
- Country: United States
- Language: Silent (English intertitles)

The Big Show is the ninth Our Gang short subject comedy to be released. The Our Gang series (later known as "The Little Rascals") was created by Hal Roach in 1922, and continued production until 1944.

== Plot ==
After being chased away from the county fair, the gang decides to open their own junior version of the fair, complete with wild animal displays, rides, and animal stunts. To top it off, they give a live performance set inside a giant movie frame, and impersonate several popular film stars of the day.

== Notes ==
When the television rights for the original silent Pathé Our Gang comedies were sold to National Telepix and other distributors, several episodes were retitled. This film was released into TV syndication as Mischief Makers in 1960 under the title "County Fair". About two-thirds of the original film was included.

The second half of the film features a sequence with a handful of the "Our Gang" kids impersonating various popular movie stars of the day. Hal Roach had the idea for this scene after auditioning newcomer Andy Samuel. Andy decided to show Roach his impersonation of Charlie Chaplin; he also does his Chaplin impersonation in this film. In addition, Mickey Daniels imitates Douglas Fairbanks, Jack Davis imitates William S. Hart, Mary Kornman impersonates Mary Pickford, an unidentified kid impersonates Harold Lloyd, and Ernest Morrison imitates Uncle Tom (from the play Uncle Tom's Cabin).

== Cast ==
=== The Gang ===
- Joe Cobb as Joe
- Jackie Condon as Jackie
- Mickey Daniels as Mickey / Douglas Fairbanks
- Jack Davis as Jack / William S. Hart
- Allen Hoskins as Farina
- Mary Kornman as Mary / Mary Pickford
- Ernie Morrison as Booker T. / Uncle Tom
- Richard Billings as Muggsy
- Andy Samuel as Andy / Charlie Chaplin

=== Additional cast ===
- Elmo Billings as Kid at fair
- Roy Brooks as De Rues
- Dick Gilbert as Security guard
- Dinah the Mule as Herself
