= High Society (1924 film) =

1924 film

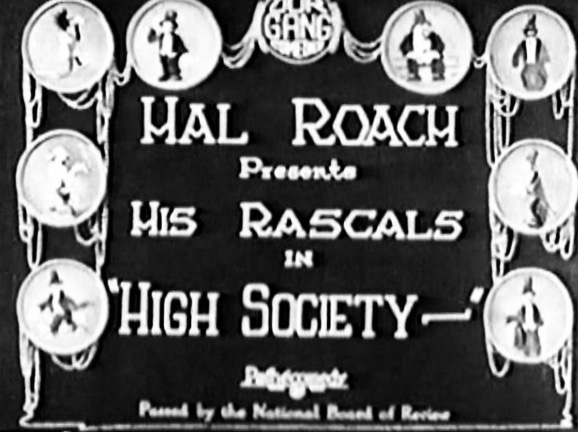
- Title card
- Directed by: Robert F. McGowan
- Written by: Frank Capra; Hal Roach; H. M. Walker
- Produced by: Hal Roach
- Starring: Mickey Daniels; Joe Cobb; Jackie Condon; Mary Kornman; Allen Hoskins; Andy Samuel; Sonny Loy; Pal the Dog; Patrick Kelly; Evelyn Burns; F. F. Guenste; Sam Lufkin; Charles A. Bachman; Jack Gavin
- Cinematography: Frank Young
- Edited by: T. J. Crizer
- Distributed by: Pathé Exchange
- Release date: August 24, 1924
- Running time: 25:08
- Country: United States
- Language: Silent (English intertitles)

High Society is a 1924 American short silent comedy film directed by Robert F. McGowan. It was the 29th Our Gang short subject to be released.

== Plot ==
Mickey lives a simple but satisfying life with his Uncle Patrick. His wealthy Aunt Kate petitions and wins custody of Mickey, forcing him to leave his home and his uncle, his friends, and his dog behind. Fighting with his cousin Percy and forced to take daily baths and manicures, Mickey is miserable. He writes a letter to Uncle Pat asking him and the gang to come visit.

During their visit the gang destroys the house, including swinging from the chandelier and skating on a liquid soap 'ice rink' in the kitchen. An alarm is sent out, bringing the police, the fire department, an ambulance, and others to the house just as Aunt Kate arrives home. Seeing the destruction and realizing her mistake in bringing Mickey to her home, Aunt Kate asks Uncle Pat to take Mickey back, to both of their delight.

== Cast ==
=== The Gang ===
- Joe Cobb as Joe
- Jackie Condon as Percival "Percy" Kelly
- Mickey Daniels as Mickey Kelly
- Allen Hoskins as Farina
- Mary Kornman as Mary
- Andy Samuel as Andy
- Sonny Loy as Sing Joy
- Pal the Dog as himself

=== Additional cast ===
- Patrick Kelly as Uncle Pat Kelly
- Evelyn Burns as Aunt Kate Kelly
- F. F. Guenste as butler
- Sam Lufkin as police detective
- Charles A. Bachman as police detective
- Jack Gavin as police detective
