= The Sun Down Limited =

1924 Our Gang short film

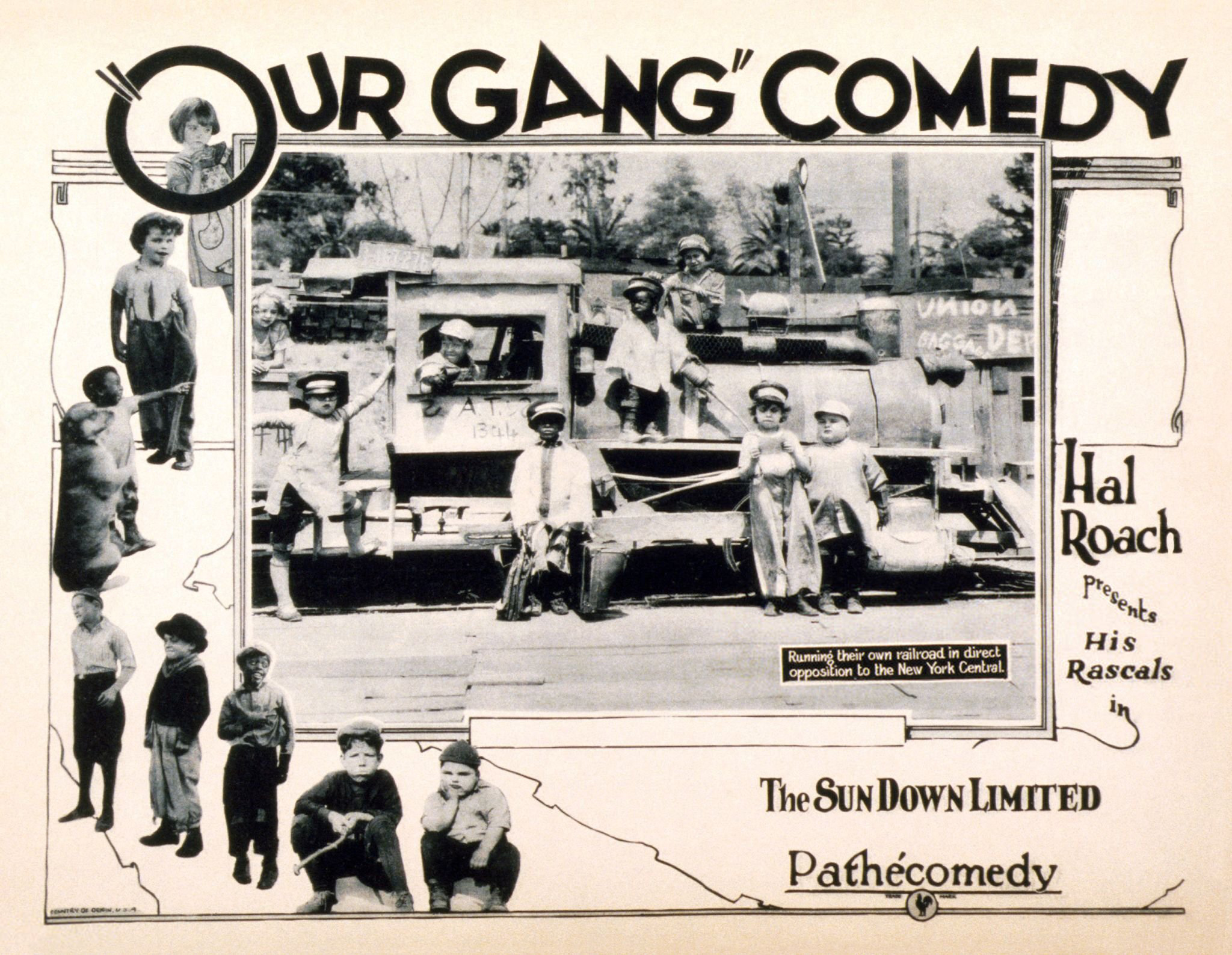
- Directed by: Robert F. McGowan
- Written by: Hal Roach; H. M. Walker
- Produced by: Hal Roach
- Starring: Joe Cobb; Jackie Condon; Mickey Daniels; Allen Hoskins; Mary Kornman; Andy Samuel; Sonny Loy; Ivadell Carter; Gabe Saienz; Lassie Lou Ahern; Peggy Ahern; Pal the Dog
- Edited by: T. J. Crizer
- Distributed by: Pathé Exchange
- Release date: September 21, 1924
- Running time: 25:43
- Country: United States
- Language: Silent with English intertitles

The Sun Down Limited is a 1924 American short silent comedy film directed by Robert F. McGowan. It was the 30th Our Gang short subject to be released. The title is a play on the Southern Pacific Railroad's Sunset Limited train service. The Sun Down Limited was remade in 1929 during the sound era as Railroadin'.

== Plot ==
The gang plays around the railyard until Joe and Mickey get them kicked out for taking an engine for a joyride. The kids try to play with Toughy and his train but are rebuffed, so they build their own railroad instead. When the girls leave Toughy for the gang's railroad, a jealous Toughy runs the gang's train off the tracks and into the city streets.

== Cast ==
=== The Gang ===
- Joe Cobb as Joe
- Jackie Condon as Jackie
- Mickey Daniels as Mickey
- Allen Hoskins as Farina
- Mary Kornman as Mary
- Andy Samuel as Andy
- Sonny Loy as Sing Joy

=== Additional cast ===
- Ivadell Carter as Mary's friend
- Gabe Saienz as Toughey
- Lassie Lou Ahern as train passenger
- Peggy Ahern as train passenger
- Pal the Dog as Toughey's dog
