= Big Business (1924 film) =

1924 film

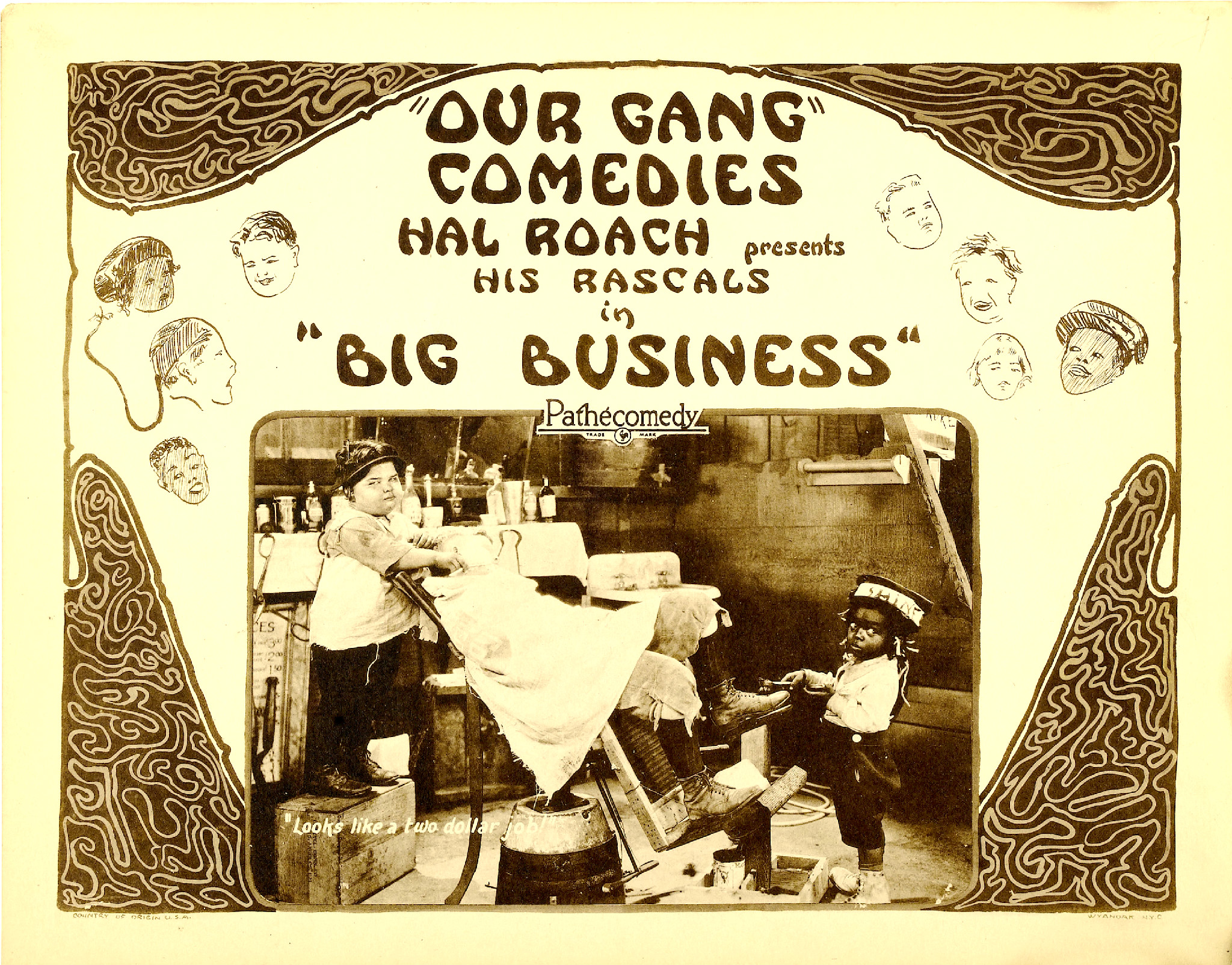
- Directed by: Robert F. McGowan
- Written by: Hal Roach; H. M. Walker
- Produced by: Hal Roach
- Starring: Joe Cobb; Jackie Condon; Mickey Daniels; Allen Hoskins; Mary Kornman; Ernest Morrison; Andy Samuel; Allan Cavan; William Gillespie; Lyle Tayo
- Distributed by: Pathé Exchange
- Release date: February 10, 1924
- Running time: 27:13
- Country: United States
- Language: Silent (English intertitles)

Big Business is a 1924 American short silent comedy film directed by Robert F. McGowan. It was the 22nd Our Gang short subject to be released.

== Plot ==
The gang starts up their own barbershop, giving the neighborhood kids haircuts that would not become popular for another sixty years. When they see Mickey in his Little Lord Fauntleroy outfit, they kidnap him and give him the works. Mickey then decides to join them in their enterprise.

== Cast ==
- Joe Cobb as Joe
- Jackie Condon as Jackie
- Mickey Daniels as Mickey
- Allen Hoskins as Farina
- Mary Kornman as Mary
- Ernest Morrison as Sunshine Sammy
- Andy Samuel as— Andy
- Allan Cavan as office worker
- William Gillespie as Mickey's father
- Lyle Tayo as Mickey's mother
