= Mickey Daniels =

American actor (1914–1970)

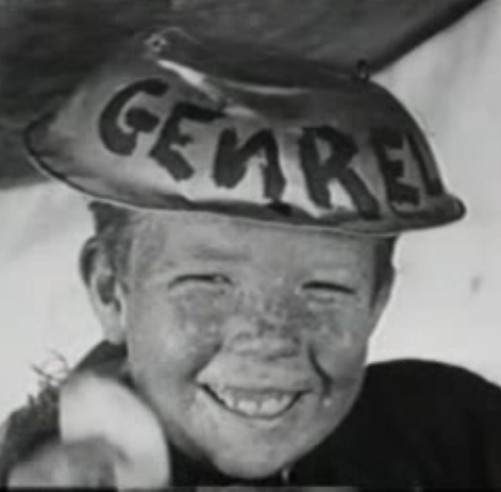
- Mickey Daniels in Dogs of War! (1923)
- Born: Richard Daniels Jr. October 11, 1914; Rock Springs, Wyoming, U.S.
- Died: August 20, 1970 (aged 55); San Diego, California, U.S.
- Resting place: Forest Lawn Memorial Park, Glendale
- Occupation: Actor
- Years active: 1921–1951
- Parent: Richard Daniels

Richard Daniels Jr. (October 11, 1914 – August 20, 1970) known professionally as Mickey Daniels, was an American child actor. Signed by Hal Roach in 1921, he was, along with Joe Cobb, Jackie Condon, Jackie Davis, Mary Kornman, and Ernie Morrison, a regular in the popular Our Gang comedies during the silent era of the series, between 1922 and 1926.

== Early life and career ==
Daniels was born in Rock Springs, Wyoming, the son of Welsh-born American actor Richard Daniels and his wife Hannah. In 1921, Daniels was discovered by a talent scout while performing at an amateur night at the Rialto Theatre in Rock Springs. Shortly thereafter, he was signed by Hal Roach to appear in the Our Gang film series.

The red-haired, freckle-faced Daniels was one of the lead characters in the Our Gang film shorts from 1922 to 1926. In the earlier shorts, he was often a rival (often with Davis) for Mary Kornman's attentions. He first appeared in the first Our Gang short Our Gang in 1922 when he was 8 years old. He was known for his big, distinctive laugh and a gift for physical comedy and timing. Daniels stayed with the series for four years until he left the series at the age of 12 in 1926. His last film as a gang member was the 1926 short Thundering Fleas, in which he appeared with equally freckle-faced Jay R. Smith, who then replaced Daniels. Daniels returned in adult cameos in a few sound-era Our Gang films, notably in Fish Hooky (1933), in which he played a truant officer chasing the kids. After Our Gang, Daniels continued his career in vaudeville and played bit parts in feature films and comedy shorts. From 1930 to 1932, Daniels and former Our Gang co-star Mary Kornman appeared in the film series The Boy Friends for Hal Roach. He continued public appearances with co-star Mary Kornman for feature film roles in the 1940s.

== Post acting career ==
After 1951, Daniels quit the movie industry and began working in construction engineering in the United States and overseas. In 1967, he began working as a taxi driver for Red Top Taxi in San Diego. He remained at that job until his death.

== Death ==
Daniels became a chronic alcoholic and was found dead on August 20, 1970, in a transient hotel in San Diego. His death was attributed to cirrhosis. Daniels is buried at Forest Lawn Memorial Park, Glendale in Glendale, California.

== Partial filmography ==
- The Little Minister (1922) - Micah Dow
- My Wild Irish Rose (1922) - Moya's little brother
- One Terrible Day (1922, Short) - Micke
- Our Gang (1922, Short) - Mickey
- Young Sherlocks (1922, Short) - JJJ Member (uncredited)
- Dr. Jack (1922) - Boy Patient (uncredited)
- Saturday Morning (1922, Short) - Mickey
- A Quiet Street (1922, Short) - Mickey
- The Champeen (1923, Short) - Mickey
- The Flame of Life (1923) (uncredited)
- The Cobbler (1923, Short) - Mickey
- The Big Show (1923, Short) - Mickey
- The Pilgrim (1923) - Sniffling Kid in Church (uncredited)
- A Pleasant Journey (1923, Short) - Mickey
- Safety Last! (1923) - Newsboy with Freckles (uncredited)
- Boys to Board (1923, Short) - Mickey
- Giants vs. Yanks (1923, Short) - Mickey
- Back Stage (1923, Short) - Mickey
- Dogs of War! (1923, Short) - Mickey
- Lodge Night (1923, Short) - Michael 'Mickey' Daniels
- July Days (1923, Short) - Mickey
- No Noise (1923, Short) - Mickey
- Stage Fright (1923, Short) - Mickey
- Derby Day (1923, Short) - Mickey
- Sunday Calm (1923, Short) - Mickey McTeeter
- Tire Trouble (1924, Short) - Mickie
- Big Business (1924, Short) - Michael 'Mickie'
- The Buccaneers (1924, Short) - Mickey
- Seein' Things (1924, Short) - Mickey
- Girl Shy (1924) - Newsboy (uncredited)
- Commencement Day (1924, Short) - Mickey
- Cradle Robbers (1924, Short) - Mickey
- Jubilo, Jr. (1924, Short) - Young Jubilo
- It's a Bear (1924, Short) - Mickey
- High Society (1924, Short) - Mickey Kelly
- The Sun Down Limited (1924, Short) - Mickey
- Battling Orioles (1924) - Our Gang Member (uncredited)
- Every Man for Himself (1924, Short) - Mickey
- Fast Company (1924, Short) - Mickey
- The Mysterious Mystery! (1924, Short) - Mickey
- The Big Town (1925, Short) - Mickey
- Circus Fever (1925, Short) - Mickey
- Dogs Days (1925, Short) - Mickey
- The Love Bug (1925, Short) - Mickey
- Shootin' Injuns (1925, Short) - Mickey
- Ask Grandma (1925, Short) - Mickey / Martha as a child
- Official Officers (1925, Short) - Mickey
- Boys Will Be Joys (1925, Short) - Mickey
- Mary, Queen of Tots (1925, Short) - Mickey / Knight in Dream Sequence
- Your Own Back Yard (1925, Short) - Mickey
- Better Movies (1925, Short) - Mickey
- One Wild Ride (1925, Short) - Mickey
- Good Cheer (1926, Short) - Mickey
- Buried Treasure (1926, Short) - Mickey
- Monkey Business (1926, Short) - Mickey
- Baby Clothes (1926, Short) - Mickey
- Uncle Tom's Uncle (1926, Short) - Mickey / 'Simon Legree'
- Thundering Fleas (1926, Short) - Mickey
- The Dummy (1929) - Job Applicant (uncredited)
- Fish Hooky (1933, Short) - Mickey Daniels
- The Constant Woman (1933) - Soda Jerk (uncredited)
- This Day and Age (1933) - Mosher
- This Side of Heaven (1934) - Stinky Bliss (uncredited)
- It Happened One Night (1934) - Vendor on Bus (uncredited)
- Vanessa: Her Love Story (1935) - Harries Servant (uncredited)
- Roaring Roads (1935) - Mickey Daniels
- Adventurous Knights (1935) - Mickey Daniels
- Magnificent Obsession (1935) - Billy (uncredited)
- Strike Me Pink (1936) - Student in Shoe Repair Shop (uncredited)
- The Great Ziegfeld (1936) - Telegraph Boy (uncredited)
- Early to Bed (1936) - Caddy (uncredited)
- Three Men on a Horse (1936) - Delivery Boy (uncredited)
- Pennies from Heaven (1936) - Hay Wagon Driver (uncredited)
- Reunion in Rhythm (1937, Short) - Himself
- Meet the Missus (1937) - Barber College Graduate (uncredited)
- Mr. Dodd Takes the Air (1937) - Electrician (uncredited)
- Young People (1940) - Man in audience (uncredited)
- A Little Bit of Heaven (1940) - Postal Union Boy (uncredited)
- Li'l Abner (1940) - Cicero Grunts
- Miss Polly (1941) - Elmer, the Grocery Boy (final film role)
