= Better Movies =

1925 film

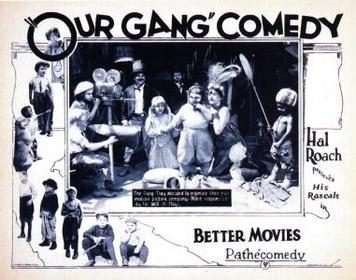
- Lobby card
- Directed by: Robert F. McGowan
- Produced by: Hal Roach
- Distributed by: Pathé Exchange
- Release date: November 1, 1925
- Running time: 20 minutes
- Country: United States
- Language: Silent with English intertitles

Better Movies is a 1925 American short silent comedy film, the 44th in the Our Gang series, directed by Robert F. McGowan.

== Cast ==
=== The Gang ===
- Joe Cobb as Joe
- Jackie Condon as Jackie
- Mickey Daniels as Mickey
- Johnny Downs as Johnny
- Allen Hoskins as Farina
- Mary Kornman as Mary
- Jay R. Smith as Turkey-egg
- Martha Sleeper as Teenaged 'Vamp'
- Billy Lord as Rich kid (unconfirmed)
- Pal the Dog as himself

=== Additional cast ===
- Jackie Hanes as Baby in audience
- Bobby Young as Audience member
- William Gillespie as Officer
- Lyle Tayo as Billy's Mother

== See also ==
- Our Gang filmography
