= Big Business (disambiguation) =

Big business is a pejorative term referring to the wielding of excessive power by large businesses.

Big Business may also refer to:

- Big Business (1924 film), an Our Gang short
- Big Business (1929 film), a Laurel and Hardy short
- Big Business (1930 film), a British comedy film
- Big Business (1934 film), a British comedy film directed by Cyril Gardner
- Big Business (1937 film), an American film
- Big Business (1988 film), a Bette Midler and Lily Tomlin film farce
- Big Business (band), a band from Seattle
- "Big Business", song from Three 6 Mafia's 1998 album CrazyNDaLazDayz
- "Big Business", song from David Byrne's score for The Catherine Wheel (album)

== See also ==
- Big government
