= The Man from the West (1926 film) =

1926 film directed by Albert S. Rogell

- Directed by: Albert S. Rogell
- Written by: Josephine Dodge; Harrison Jacobs
- Produced by: Carl Laemmle
- Starring: Art Acord; Eugenia Gilbert; Ervin Renard
- Cinematography: Edward Linden
- Production company: Universal Pictures
- Distributed by: Universal Pictures
- Release date: October 31, 1926
- Country: United States
- Languages: Silent; English intertitles

The Man from the West is a 1926 American silent Western film directed by Albert S. Rogell and starring Art Acord, Eugenia Gilbert and Ervin Renard.

== Cast ==
- Art Acord as Art Louden
- Eugenia Gilbert as Iris Millard
- Ervin Renard as Carter Blake
- William Welsh as Bill Hayes
- Vin Moore as Lloyd Millard
- Dick Gilbert as Hanna
- George Grandee as Ranch Guest
- Eunice Murdock Moore as Iris's Aunt
