= Andy Samuel =

American child actor (1909–1992)

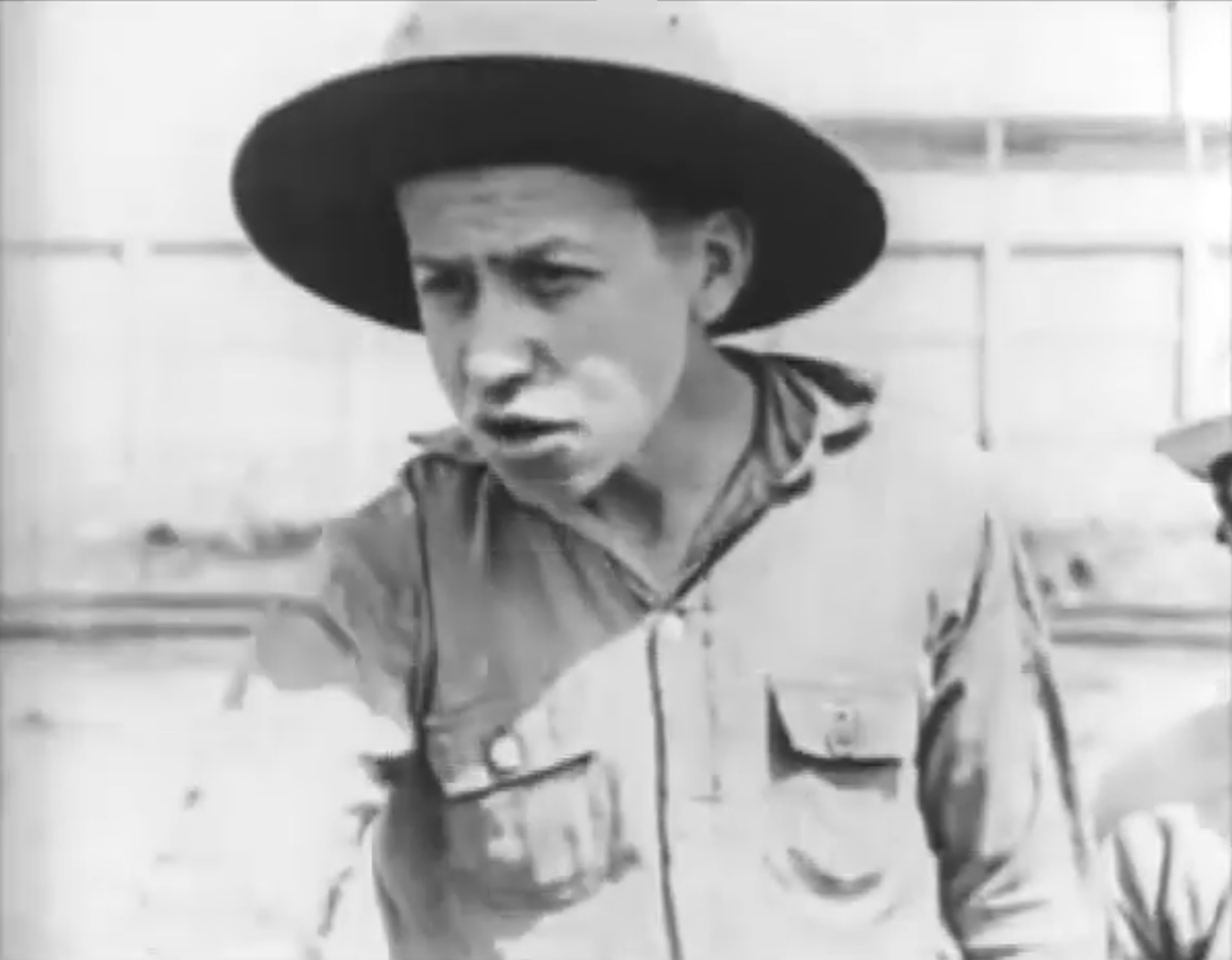
- Samuel in The Sun Down Limited (1924)
- Born: April 10, 1909; New York City, US
- Died: March 5, 1992 (aged 82); Colton, California, US
- Occupation: Child actor
- Years active: 1923–1971

Andrew "Andy" Samuel (April 10, 1909 – March 5, 1992) was an American child actor who appeared in Hal Roach's Our Gang comedies during the silent era.

== Career ==
Samuel entered Hal Roach's films after tagging along to the studio with his older brother, who worked for actor Ramon Novarro. According to the Los Angeles Times, he appeared in Roach's seventh ''Our Gang'' production, The Big Show, released on February 25, 1923. The same source said Samuel was already 13 when he began in the series and left after he out grew the role. His final appearance in the series was a bit part in the 1925 short, Boys Will Be Joys.

== Death ==
Samuel died on March 5, 1992, at the Reche Canyon Convalescent Home in Colton, California, at the age of 82.

== Selected "Our Gang" Filmography ==
- The Champeen (1923)
- The Big Show (1923)
- Boys to Board (1923)
- Giants vs. Yanks (1923)
- Back Stage (1923)
- Dogs of War (1923)
- Lodge Night (1923)
- No Noise (1923)
- Big Business (1924)
- The Buccaneers (1924)
- Seein' Things (1924)
- Commencement Day (1924)
- Jubilo, Jr. (1924)
- High Society (1924)
- The Sun Down Limited (1924)
- Every Man for Himself (1924)
- Fast Company (1924)
- The Mysterious Mystery! (1924)
- Boys Will Be Joys (1925)
