= Please (film) =

- Directed by: Arvid E. Gillstrom
- Written by: Dean Ward; Vernon Dent
- Produced by: Arvid E. Gillstrom
- Starring: Bing Crosby; Vernon Dent; Mary Kornman
- Cinematography: Gus Peterson
- Edited by: Jack English
- Distributed by: Paramount Pictures
- Release date: December 15, 1933
- Running time: 22 minutes
- Country: United States
- Language: English

Please is a 1933 short musical comedy film directed and produced by Arvid E. Gillstrom. It stars Bing Crosby as himself along with Vernon Dent and Mary Kornman.

== Plot ==
Elmer Smoot and Bing Crosby both have a crush on vocal teacher Beth Sawyer, who is sponsoring an upcoming music recital. Smoot is an aspiring singer who hopes to run Bing Crosby off the radio, though he doesn't realize Crosby's identity when he meets him. They become bitter rivals for Sawyer's affection. At the recital, as Smoot sings the old-fashioned song "Dear Old Girl," Crosby's dog runs loose onto the stage and ruins Smoot's performance. Though Crosby didn't intend for this to happen, Sawyer is embarrassed and angry.

Crosby, using the pseudonym of Howard Jones, croons the song "I Don't Stand a Ghost of a Chance with You" and wins the audience over. Sawyer is pleased. While Crosby sings, Smoot finds a signed photograph of Bing Crosby and notices the resemblance between him and "Howard Jones". When the song is over, he rushes to the stage and informs the audience that Howard Jones is indeed Bing Crosby. This amuses the audience, and Sawyer is humiliated. Later, Sawyer is surprised by Crosby singing "Please" through her window. Sawyer forgives him, and they kiss. They drive away passing a garage where Smoot is destroying what he erroneously thinks is Crosby's car.

== Cast ==
- Bing Crosby as himself / Howard Jones
- Vernon Dent as Elmer Smoot
- Mary Kornman as Beth Sawyer
- Dickie Kibby as Sonny
- Dick Elliott as Sonny's father
- Dorothy Vernon as an extra in the audience (uncredited)

== Reception ==
The Film Daily liked it saying: "Between Bing Crosby’s several vocal numbers and the intervening comedy sequences this Arvid E. Gillstrom two-reeler manages to be consistently entertaining. Crosby, driving along the road, does a little flirting with Mary Kornman, who turns out to be a voice teacher. So he stops at her place for lessons. A rival, Vernon Dent, pulls various pranks to eliminate Crosby, but only makes things worse for himself, with Crosby finally coming through, not only as the star crooner, but also in a romantic way."

In Los Angeles where Bing had recently been appearing, the reception was enthusiastic too. "Two shorts, Bing Crosby in Please and a Popeye cartoon almost run the main feature off the screen. Crosby sings and clowns with Vernon Dent and, although he has just completed a week at the Paramount, the audience reacted as if he had been off the screen for ages."

== Soundtrack ==
- "You're Getting to Be a Habit with Me" (sung by Bing Crosby)

Music by Harry Warren
Lyrics by Al Dubin

- "Dear Old Girl" (sung by Vernon Dent)

Music by Theodore Morse
Lyrics by Richard Henry Buck

- "I Don't Stand a Ghost of a Chance with You" (sung by Bing Crosby)

Music by Victor Young
Lyrics by Ned Washington and Bing Crosby

- "Please" (sung by Bing Crosby)

Music by Ralph Rainger
Lyrics by Leo Robin
