= Allan Cavan =

American actor (1880–1941)

- Born: March 25, 1880; Concord, California, U.S.
- Died: January 19, 1941 (aged 60); Hollywood, California, U.S.
- Years active: 1917–1941

Allan Cavan (March 25, 1880 – January 19, 1941) was an American film actor. He appeared in 145 films between 1917 and 1941.

Cavan was the son of Mrs. Averila Cavan, and he had a brother, Carl. He began working on films with Sam Goldwyn Studios in 1916 and later worked for Warner Bros.

Cavan died at Cedars of Lebanon Hospital on January 19, 1941, aged 60.

== Partial filmography ==
- The Scarlet Car (1917) - a mob member (uncredited)
- Big Business (1924)
- Leave It to Gerry (1924)
- The Mysterious Mystery! (1924)
- Thundering Fleas (1926) - father of the bride
- London After Midnight (1927) - Estate agent
- The Million Dollar Collar (1929)
- The Donovan Affair (1929)
- Painted Faces (1929)
- Saturday's Lesson (1929)
- No Limit (1931)
- Dishonored (1931)
- New Adventures of Get Rich Quick Wallingford (1931)
- The Intruder (1933)
- Transatlantic Merry-Go-Round (1934)
- Badge of Honor (1934)
- Thicker than Water (1935)
- The Adventures of Rex and Rinty (1935)
- Red Salute (1935)
- Hong Kong Nights (1935)
- Streamline Express (1935)
- Men of the Hour (1935)
- The New Frontier (1935)
- Hearts in Bondage (1936)
- Code of the Range (1936)
- Rebellion (1936)
- Jail Bait (1937)
- Two Gun Justice (1938)
- Paroled from the Big House (1938)
- Brother Rat (1938)
- In Old Montana (1939)
