= William Gillespie (actor) =

Scottish actor (1894–1938)

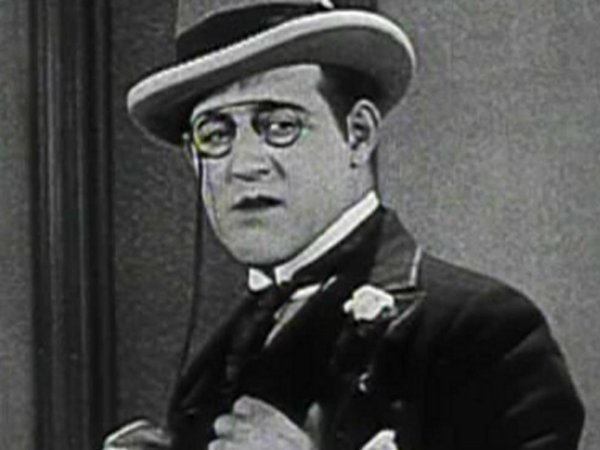
- Gillespie in Smithy (1924)
- Born: 24 January 1894; Aberdeen, Scotland, UK
- Died: 23 June 1938 (aged 44); Los Angeles, California, U.S.
- Resting place: Calvary Cemetery, East Los Angeles, California, U.S.
- Occupation: Actor
- Years active: 1915–1938
- Spouse: Ann Monahan (?-?)

William Gillespie (24 January 1894 – 23 June 1938) was a Scottish actor.

== Biography ==
Gillespie started in Hollywood films from the silent era. He played in about 180 films between 1915 and 1939, although his appearances were often uncredited. Gillespie frequently appeared in Hal Roach comedies from 1917, usually as stuffy official or manager. He supported such "slapstick comedians" as Charlie Chaplin, Charley Chase, Our Gang, and Laurel and Hardy, but was most prolific supporting Harold Lloyd in 60 films.

== Selected filmography ==
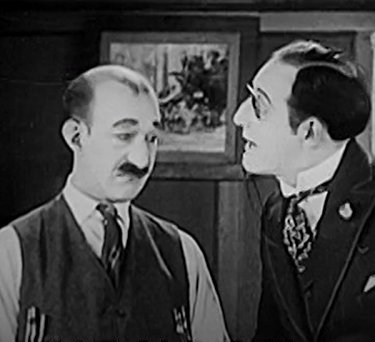
William Gillespie (right) with James Finlayson in The Noon Whistle (1923)

- The Cure (1917)
- Easy Street (1917)
- The Immigrant (1917)
- The Big Idea (1917)
- Look Pleasant, Please (1918)
- Here Come the Girls (1918)
- Swing Your Partners (1918)
- Take a Chance (1918) (uncredited)
- Bumping into Broadway (1919)
- An Eastern Westerner (1920) (uncredited)
- High and Dizzy (1920) (uncredited)
- Get Out and Get Under (1920) (uncredited)
- Number, Please? (1920) (uncredited)
- Among Those Present (1921)
- Now or Never (1921)
- One Terrible Day (1922)
- Young Sherlocks (1922)
- Doctor Jack (1922)
- Saturday Morning (1922)
- A Quiet Street (1922)
- Safety Last! (1923)
- Under Two Jags (1923)
- Why Worry? (1923) (uncredited)
- A Pleasant Journey (1923)
- Giants vs. Yanks (1923)
- Back Stage (1923)
- Her Dangerous Path (1923)
- Stage Fright (1923)
- Scorching Sands (1923)
- Big Business (1924)
- Near Dublin (1924)
- All Wet (1924)
- The Mysterious Mystery! (1924)
- The Big Town (1925)
- Dog Days (1925)
- The Love Bug (1925)
- Better Movies (1925)
- The Valley of Bravery (1926)
- Exit Smiling (1926)
- Bromo and Juliet (1926)
- Playin' Hookey (1928)
- Barnum & Ringling, Inc. (1928)
- Wrong Again (1929)
- Double Whoopee (1929)
- Pups Is Pups (1930)
- Helping Grandma (1931)
- The Music Box (1932) as Piano Salesman (uncredited)
- Sons of the Desert (1933)
