= Mary Kornman =

American actress (1915–1973)

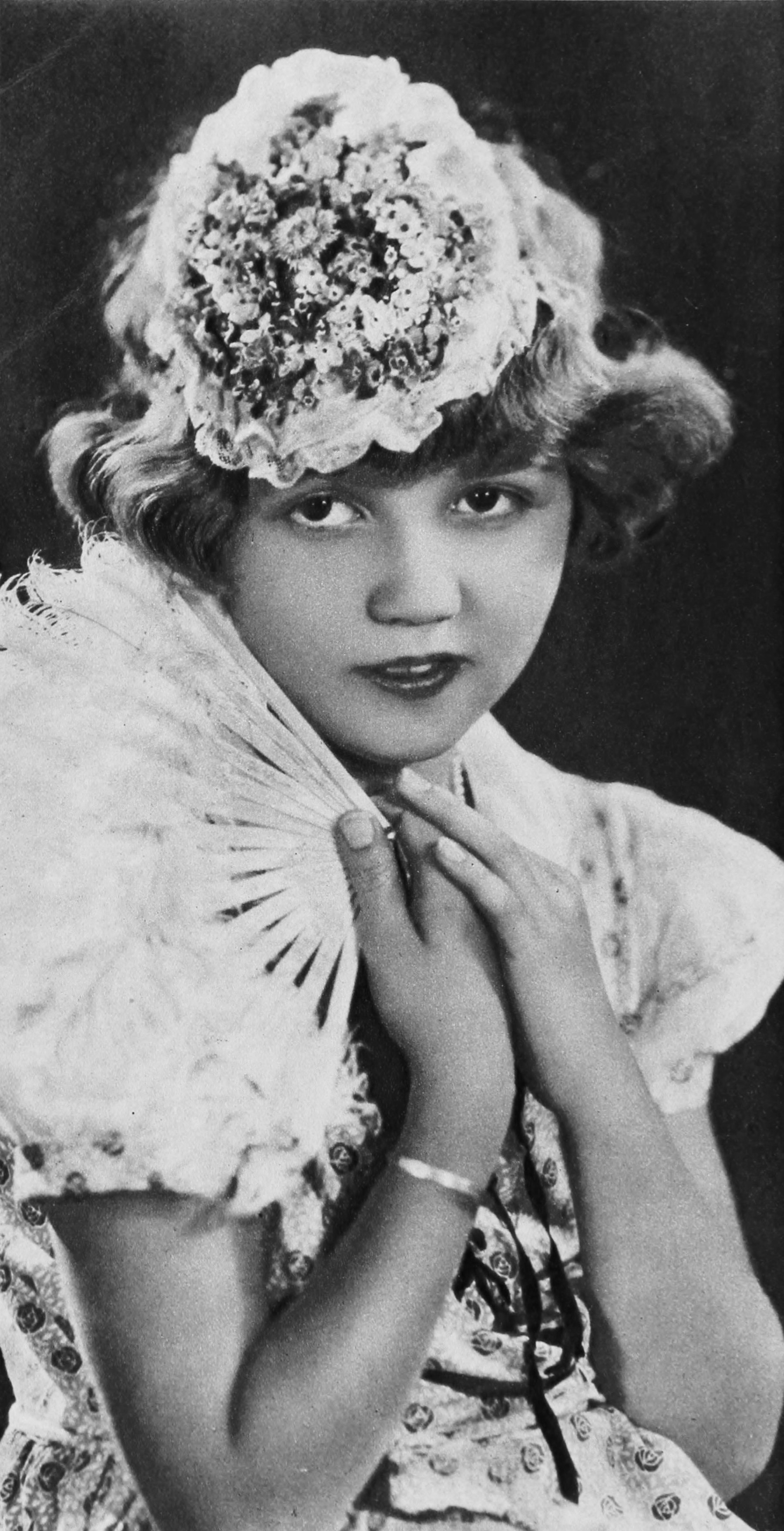
- Kornman in 1926
- Born: Mary Agnes Evans; December 27, 1915; Idaho Falls, Idaho, U.S.
- Died: June 1, 1973 (aged 57); Glendale, California, U.S.
- Resting place: Linn Grove Cemetery, Greeley, Colorado
- Occupation: Actress
- Years active: 1922–1963
- Spouses: Leo Tover (m. 1934; div. 1938) Ralph B. McCutcheon (m. 1940)
- Website: http://www.marykornman.com

Mary Kornman (born Mary Agnes Evans, December 27, 1915 – June 1, 1973) was an American child actress who was the leading female star of the Our Gang series during the Pathé silent era.

== Our Gang ==
She was born as Mary Agnes Evans, and was the daughter of Verna Comer, who appeared in several films, and David Lionel Evans. Her stepfather, Hal Roach′s still-photo cameraman Eugene Kornman, adopted Mary after he and Mary's mother were married in 1921. After Peggy Cartwright, who appeared in only four or five Our Gang episodes, Mary became the leading lady of the series, appearing in more than 40 episodes. Kornman was one of the series′ biggest stars during its early years between 1922 and 1926. After outgrowing the Our Gang series, she and fellow Our Gang alumnus Scooter Lowry spent a couple of years performing as a vaudeville duo. They were later joined by Johnny Downs, who played Kornman's love interest.

== Mildred Kornman ==
Her younger sister, Mildred, was also a child actress. When asked in 1960 what she thought of being part of Our Gang, Mildred Kornman replied "It was fun being a gang member. It was play. I have no regrets...We didn't have to be talented, which is natural for kids ... I think we had a privileged childhood working in those films."

== Later years and death ==
Mary continued working with Our Gang co-star Mickey Daniels into adulthood, as evidenced by some publicity shots from the era. She appeared with Mickey in the teen version of Our Gang, The Boy Friends. In 1934, she married Leo Tover, a cameraman, but they divorced approximately five years later.

Throughout the 1930s, she continued to appear in many features such as the serial Queen of the Jungle (1935), and The Desert Trail (1935) starring John Wayne. She retired from the screen in 1940.

She later married Ralph B. McCutcheon, a horse trainer on some of her Western films. Mary spent the rest of her life devoted to him. They had no children. They both spent their remaining years on their ranch with the horses. She kept close with her Hollywood acquaintances and friends. When asked if Mary was as kind and genuine a person as she appeared to be onscreen, her sister Mildred replied, "She was all of that and more."

Mary became gravely ill in the early 1970s and was eventually diagnosed with cancer. She died on June 1, 1973, aged 57. Her widower died two years later. They are interred at Linn Grove Cemetery, Greeley, Colorado.

== Filmography ==
=== Our Gang Shorts ===
- The Champeen (1923) - Mary
- The Cobbler (1923) - Mary, 'Little Miss Riches'
- The Big Show (1923) - Mary
- A Pleasant Journey (1923) - Mary
- Dogs of War (1923) - Mary
- Lodge Night (1923) - Mary
- July Days (1923) - Mary
- No Noise (1923) - Mary
- Stage Fright (1923) - Mary
- Derby Day (1923) - Mary
- Tire Trouble (1924) - Mary
- Big Business (1924) - Mary
- The Buccaneers (1924) - Mary
- Seein′ Things (1924) - Mary
- Commencement Day (1924) - Mary
- Cradle Robbers (1924) - Mary
- Jubilo, Jr. (1924) - Mary
- It′s a Bear (1924) - Mary
- High Society (1924) - Mary
- The Sun Down Limited (1924) - Mary
- Every Man for Himself (1924) - Mary
- Fast Company (1924) - Mary
- The Big Town (1925) - Mary
- Circus Fever (1925) - Mary
- Dog Days (1925) - Mary
- The Love Bug (1925) - Mary
- Shootin′ Injuns (1925) - Mary
- Ask Grandma (1925) - Mary
- Official Officers (1925) - Mary
- Boys Will Be Joys (1925) - Mary
- Mary, Queen of Tots (1925) - Mary
- Your Own Back Yard (1925) - Mary
- Better Movies (1925) - Mary
- One Wild Ride (1925) - Mary
- Good Cheer (1926) - Mary
- Buried Treasure (1926) - Mary
- Monkey Business (1926) - Mary
- Baby Clothes (1926) - Mary
- Uncle Tom′s Uncle (1926) - Mary
- Thundering Fleas (1926) - Mary
- Shivering Spooks (1926) - Mary
- The Fourth Alarm (1926) - Mary
- Fish Hooky (1933) - Mary (Guest Appearance)
- Reunion in Rhythm (1937) - Mary (Guest Appearance)

=== The Boy Friends Shorts ===
- Doctor′s Orders (1930) - Mary
- Bigger and Better (1930) - Mary
- Ladies Last (1930) - Mary
- Blood and Thunder (1931) - Mary
- High Gear (1931) - Mary
- Love Fever (1931) - Mary
- Air-Tight (1931) - Mary
- Call a Cop! (1931) - Mary
- Mama Loves Papa (1931) - Mary
- The Kick-Off! (1931) - Mary
- Love Pains (1932) - Mary
- The Knock-Out (1932) - Mary
- Too Many Women (1932) - Mary
- Wild Babies (1932) - Mary

=== Other Shorts and Feature Length Films ===
- Are These Our Children (1931) - Agnes "Dumbbell"
- Exposure (1932) - Eileen Foster - Socialite (uncredited)
- Me and My Pal (1933, Short) - Bridesmaid (uncredited)
- Bondage (1933) - Bit in Record Store (uncredited)
- College Humor (1933) - Amber Davis
- Neighbors' Wives (1933) - Mary McGrath
- Please (1933, Short) - Beth Sawyer
- Flying Down to Rio (1933) - Belinha's Friend (uncredited)
- Just an Echo (1934, Short)
- The Quitter (1934) - Annabelle Hibbs
- Picture Brides (1934) - Mataeo Rogers
- Strictly Dynamite (1934) - Party Girl (uncredited)
- Madame Du Barry (1934) - Sweet Pea (uncredited)
- Smokey Smith (1935) - Bess Bart
- Roaring Roads (1935) - Mary McDowell
- The Desert Trail (1935) - Anne
- Adventurous Knights (1935) - Annette
- Queen of the Jungle (1935, Serial) - Joan Lawrence / Mary Lawrence
- The Calling of Dan Matthews (1935) - Kitty Marley
- Swing It, Professor (1937) - Joan Dennis
- Youth on Parole (1937) - Mae Blair
- King of the Newsboys (1938) - Peggy
- That Certain Age (1938) - Friend (uncredited)
- I Am a Criminal (1938) - Alice Martin
- Zenobia (1939) - Townswoman (uncredited)
- On the Spot (1940) - Ruth Hunter
- Shiny (1963) - Lady (final film role)

=== Errata ===
There is some discrepancy concerning which of the early Our Gang films Mary actually appeared in. According to The Lucky Corner website, Mary did not appear in any of the following four films.

- One Terrible Day (1922), listed by the Internet Movie Data Base
- Young Sherlocks (1922), listed by the Internet Movie Data Base and by Maltin and Bann
- Saturday Morning (1922), listed by the Internet Movie Data Base
- A Quiet Street (1922), listed by the Internet Movie Data Base
