= Jack Davis (actor) =

American child actor (1914–1992)

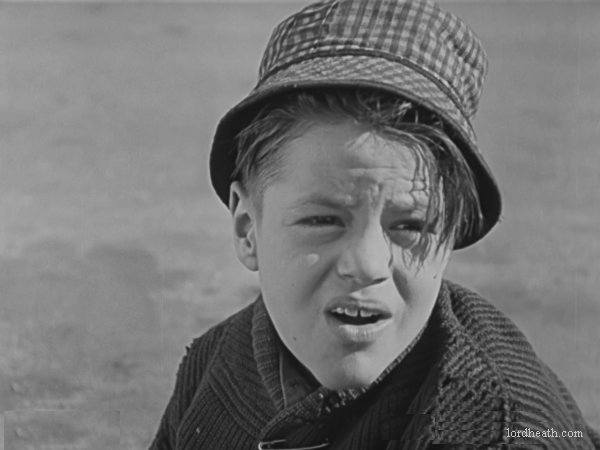
- Davis in The Big Show (1923)
- Born: John H. Davis; April 5, 1914; Los Angeles, California, U.S.
- Died: November 3, 1992 (aged 78); Santa Monica, California, U.S.
- Other name: Jackie Davis
- Occupation: Actor
- Years active: 1922–1958
- Spouse: Josephine Davis
- Relatives: Mildred Davis (sister)

John H. Davis (April 5, 1914 – November 3, 1992) was an American child actor, notable for appearing in Hal Roach's Our Gang series. His sister Mildred Davis also acted; she appeared in Roach comedian Harold Lloyd's films as his leading lady. When Lloyd and Mildred were married in 1923, Lloyd pulled Jack out of Our Gang and enrolled him in military school.

== Career ==
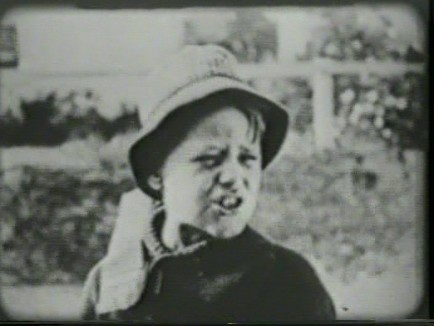
Davis in The Champeen (1923)

Davis first appeared in the fourth Our Gang short, Young Sherlocks. He was known as the little tough boy and was a rival (usually with Mickey) for Mary Kornman's affections. In other shorts he was a just a member of the gang instead of a bully. His screen career ended after 19 shorts in the series when Harold Lloyd and his older sister, Mildred Davis, got married, and Lloyd put the boy into military school. His final appearance was the 1923 short Derby Day. After degrees in anthropology and medicine Davis became a successful physician in the Los Angeles area, specialising in cardiology, and associate professor at the UCLA School of Medicine. He was the grandfather of American actress Carrie Mitchum and actor Bentley Mitchum.

== Death ==
Davis died in 1992 in Santa Monica, California of respiratory failure at the age of 78.
