= Dick Gilbert =

American actor (1889–1960)

Richard "Fighting Dick" Gilbert (July 12, 1889 – May 6, 1960), was an American boxer and actor mainly associated with the Hal Roach Studios, where he appeared in numerous Our Gang and Laurel and Hardy comedies. He appeared in 52 films between 1922 and 1952.

== Career ==
In the 1910s, Gilbert won a boxing match against future heavyweight champion Jack Dempsey.

In 1926, Gilbert starred in the film The Man from the West.

== Personal life ==
At one point, Gilbert lived in Culver City, California. On May 6, 1960, he died at the age of 69 in Goldfield, Nevada.

== Partial filmography ==
- Near Dublin (1924)
- The White Sheep (1924)
- The Man from the West (1926)
- Fluttering Hearts (1927)
- The Battle of the Century (1927)
- Blotto (1930)
- Beau Hunks (1931)
- Pardon Us (1931)
- Any Old Port (1932)
- The Live Ghost (1934)
- The Fixer Uppers (1935)
- Our Relations (1936)
- Chad Hanna (1940)
