= Sunshine Sammy Morrison =

American actor and comedian (1912–1989)

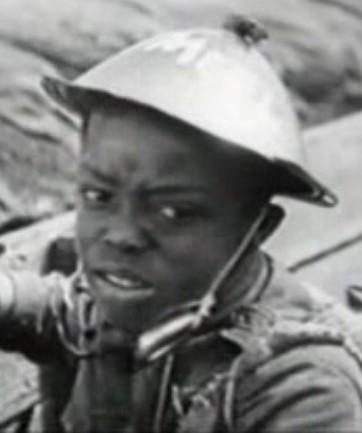
- Ernie Morrison as Sunshine Sammy in Dogs of War (1923)
- Born: Ernest Fredric Morrison; December 20, 1912; New Orleans, Louisiana, U.S.
- Died: July 24, 1989 (aged 76); Lynwood, California, U.S.
- Other names: Sunshine Sammy; Little Sambo; Smiling Sambo
- Occupations: Actor; vaudeville; comedian; dancer; band leader
- Years active: 1916–1974

Ernest Fredric Morrison (December 20, 1912 – July 24, 1989) was an American child actor, comedian, vaudevillian, and dancer who also performed under the stage-name Sunshine Sammy Morrison. He was the only black member of the East Side Kids and was an original performer in Our Gang, a 1920s silent film and early sound film franchise.

== Early life ==
Born in 1912 in New Orleans, Morrison was the brother of Florence Morrison and stage- and screen-actress Dorothy Morrison. He entered show-business as a replacement for another infant actor who constantly cried. A crew member asked Morrison's father, Ernest Morrison Sr., to bring in his newborn son. Because Morrison sat perfectly and didn't cry during filming, the crew christened him with the name "Sunshine". Morrison's father added "Sammy" to his son's stage name to create the iconic character Sunshine Sammy.

== Biography ==
Morrison ultimately appeared in two-reel silent comedies opposite both Harold Lloyd and Snub Pollard, two of the era's biggest comedians. He was the first African-American actor to be signed to a long-term contract, signing with studio executive and comedy producer Hal Roach in 1919. When Roach conceived his Our Gang series, featuring child actors in a natural juvenile setting in 1921, Sammy was the first child recruited. Morrison left the series in January 1925; the young actor was then making $225 a week (equal to about $4,000 weekly in 2025), and his father demanded a pay raise of $75 a week, which Roach refused. Ernie Morrison's last Roach credits were Jimmie Parrott comedies; these had been filmed in 1923 but were not released to theatres until 1926.

Ernie Morrison went to make personal appearances in vaudeville, where his talents were featured on the same bills with such up-and-coming acts as Abbott and Costello and Jack Benny.

After touring in Australia with partner Sleepy Williams, Morrison returned to the United States and was chosen by producer Sam Katzman to be one of the East Side Kids. From the beginning, Morrison tapped into his experiences growing up on the East Side of New York City to shape the character of "Scruno." He spent three years with the gang before leaving to pursue other opportunities, often doing promotional stints with Huntz Hall and Bobby Jordan. Morrison left the series when he was offered an opportunity to work with the Step Brothers act, a prominent black stage-and-film dance act. He was drafted into the army during World War II. After being discharged, he was offered a part in The Bowery Boys, the successor to the East Side Kids that was just being launched, but he declined the offer. Morrison "didn't like the setup": Leo Gorcey and Huntz Hall were now the stars of the troupe, and Bobby Jordan and the other gang members were now incidental players and paid much less.

Morrison later worked as a quality control inspector for an aerospace company in Compton, California. In later years, Morrison appeared in a guest spot on the sitcom Good Times airing in 1974.

Morrison died of cancer in Lynwood aged 76, on July 24, 1989. He is interred at Inglewood Park Cemetery in Inglewood, California, where later Our Gang cast member Buckwheat Thomas is also buried.

== Selected filmography ==
Year	Title	Role	Notes
1916	The Soul of a Child		Uncredited
1918	Dolly's Vacation	Ebenezer Eczema Abraham White	Credited as Sambo
1919	Peggy Does Her Darndest	Snowball Snow	
1919	The Little Diplomat	George Washington Jones, Jr.	Credited as Little Sambo
1920	Haunted Spooks	House Boy	Uncredited
1920	All Lit Up	The Kid	
1920	Number, Please?	Suit Duster	Uncredited
1920	Waltz Me Around		Credited as Sunshine Sammy Morrison
1920	Get Out and Get Under	Child on the street	Uncredited
1921	Rush Orders	Narcissus	Credited as Sunshine Sammy Morrison
1921	The Pickaninny	Little Casino	Credited as Sunshine Sammy
1922	One Terrible Day	Booker T.	
1922	Saturday Morning	Sorghum	
1923	The Champeen	Sammy	
1923	Sunday Calm	Sammy	
1923	The Cobbler	Ernie	
1923	A Pleasant Journey	Ernie	
1923	No Noise	Sunshine Sammy	
1924	Fast Company	Sunshine Sammy	
1924	It's a Bear	Sunshine Sammy	
1926	Between Meals	In Need	Credited as Sunshine Sammy Morrison
1940	I Can't Give You Anything But Love, Baby	Joe	Credited as Sammy Morrison
1940	Boys of the City	Scruno	Credited as Sunshine Sammy Morrison
1940	That Gang of Mine	Scruno	Credited as Sunshine Sammy Morrison
1940	Pride of the Bowery	Scruno	Credited as Sunshine Sammy Morrison
1941	Spooks Run Wild	Scruno	Credited as Sunshine Sammy Morrison
1941	Flying Wild	Scruno	Credited as Sunshine Sammy Morrison
1941	Bowery Blitzkrieg	Scruno	Credited as Sunshine Sammy Morrison
1942	Mr. Wise Guy	Scruno	Uncredited
1942	Let's Get Tough!	Scruno	Credited as Sunshine Sammy Morrison
1942	Smart Alecks	Scruno	Credited as Sunshine Sammy
1942	'Neath Brooklyn Bridge	Scruno	Credited as Sunshine Sammy Morrison
1943	Kid Dynamite	Scruno	Credited as Sunshine Sammy
1943	Clancy Street Boys	Scruno	Credited as Sammy Morrison
1943	The Ape Man	Copyboy	Uncredited
1943	Ghosts on the Loose	Scruno	Credited as Sammy Morrison
1944	Follow the Leader	Scruno in a dream sequence only	Uncredited
1944	Greenwich Village	One of the Four Step Brothers	Uncredited
1974	Good Times	Messenger	Episode: "The TV Commercial"

== Bibliography ==
- Holmstrom, John. The Moving Picture Boy: An International Encyclopaedia from 1895 to 1995, Norwich, Michael Russell, 1996, pp. 56–58.
- Dye, David. Child and Youth Actors: Filmography of Their Entire Careers, 1914-1985. Jefferson, NC: McFarland & Co., 1988, p. 165.
