= Robert F. McGowan =

American film director and producer (1882–1955)

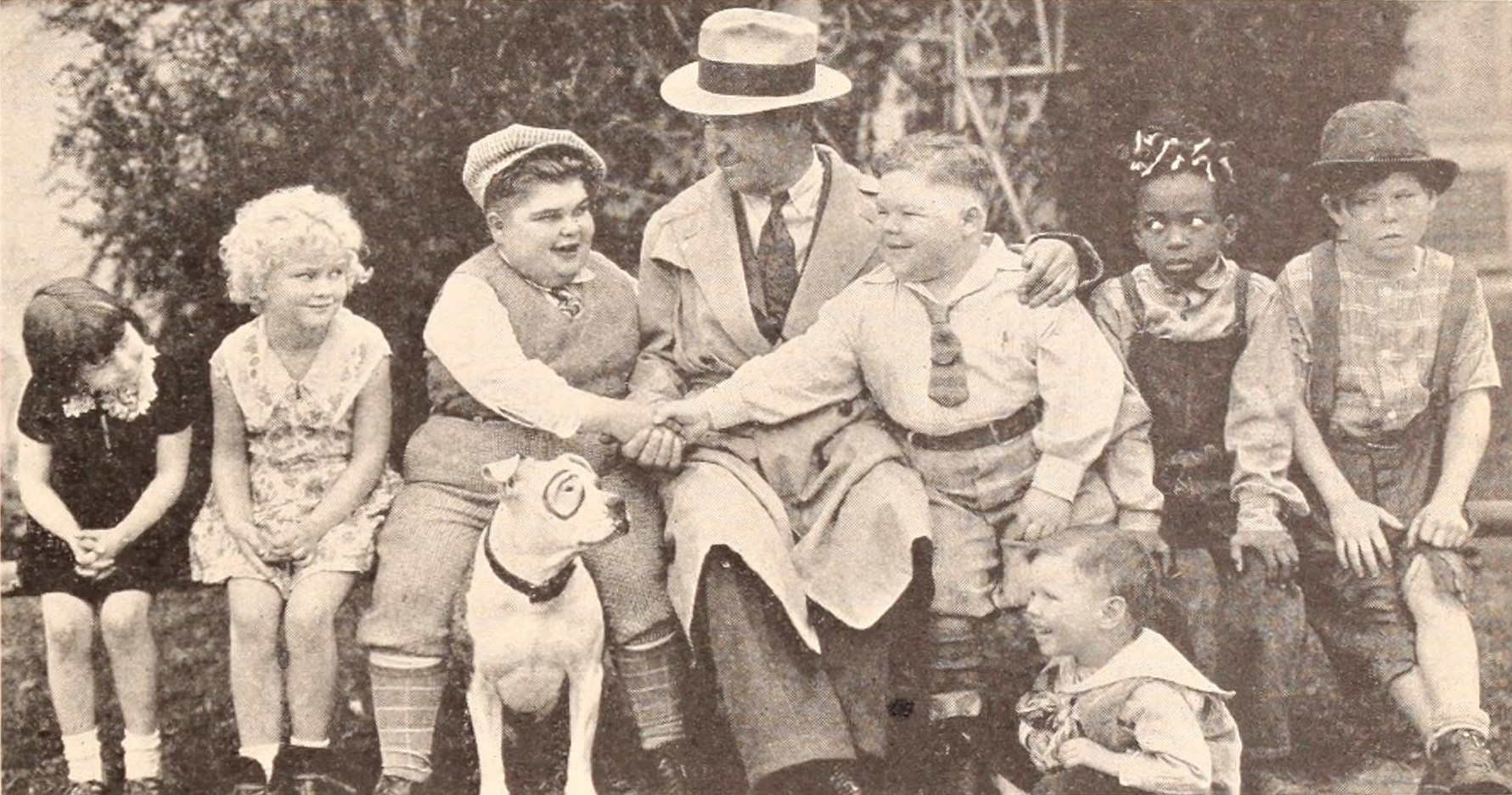
- Our Gang with Robert Francis McGowan
- Born: Robert Francis McGowan; July 11, 1882; Denver, Colorado, US
- Died: January 27, 1955 (aged 72); Santa Monica, California, US
- Occupations: Film director, film producer
- Years active: 1921–1946

Robert Francis McGowan (July 11, 1882 – January 27, 1955) was an American film director and producer, best known as the senior director of the Our Gang short subjects film series from 1922 until 1933.

== Career ==
Before moving to Los Angeles, McGowan was a firefighter in his native Denver. An on-the-job accident during a fire rescue mission left him with a permanent limp.

McGowan moved to California in the 1910s and made the acquaintance of Hal Roach, an aspiring film producer who opened his own studio in 1914. By 1920, McGowan was a director at the Roach studio, and in 1921 began work on the first entries in the Our Gang series.

The Our Gang series was at its most popular and successful under McGowan's direction; when he became ill in the late-1920s and had to turn over the director's chair to nephew Robert A. McGowan (billed as "Anthony Mack" to distinguish himself from his uncle) for two years, the series faltered. McGowan was a natural with kids, and knew how to explain scenes and comic business to his young charges to elicit convincing performances out of them. His favorite Our Gang kids were Allen "Farina" Hoskins, Mary Kornman, Matthew "Stymie" Beard, and George "Spanky" McFarland, whom McGowan declared a "natural".

McGowan's daughter Jerry was an actress and dancer herself; she would often sit in on Our Gang story meetings and appears onscreen in Shivering Shakespeare.

McGowan left Our Gang in 1933 due to the strain of dealing with stage mothers and additional hassles involved with directing child stars. He moved over to Paramount Pictures to helm features such as One Too Many (1934), Frontier Justice, and Too Many Parents. McGowan returned for one last Our Gang short (Divot Diggers) in 1936, and later produced two Our Gang derived featurettes for Hal Roach, Curley and Who Killed Doc Robbin, in the 1940s after retiring from directing.

== Death ==
McGowan died of cancer in Santa Monica, California, on January 27, 1955, at the age of 72. His nephew, screenwriter and director Robert A. McGowan, died five months later. He also had a daughter, Mickie McGowan, a voice actress.
