= H. M. Walker =

American screenwriter (1878–1937)

- Walker, 1920
- Born: Harley Marquis Walker; June 27, 1878; Logan County, Ohio, United States
- Died: June 23, 1937 (aged 58); Chicago, Illinois, United States
- Occupation: Screenwriter
- Years active: 1917–1935

Harley Marquis Walker (June 27, 1878 – June 23, 1937) was a member of the Hal Roach Studios production company from 1916 until his resignation in 1932. The title cards he wrote for Harold Lloyd, Charley Chase, Our Gang and Laurel and Hardy comedies "have entered legend, both for silent films, and as opening remarks for the earlier talkies." He was also an officer of the Roach Studio corporation.

== Background ==
Like many screenwriters of the time such as Ben Hecht and Charles MacArthur, Walker came to the screen trade from the freewheeling world of newspaper journalism. He was a sports writer for the Los Angeles Examiner before joining Roach.

On Roach's "Lot of Fun", script development usually started with meetings among the gag men, who would develop what was known as an "action script": the outline of the story and a description of the scenes and some of the sight gags, which generally would run three to six legal-size pages. This document would then pass to Walker, the head of the editorial department, which oversaw not only script editing, but film editing as well. Walker usually came up with the title of each film, wrote "brilliantly witty" title cards which would be produced and inserted into the film, and wrote a critique before the picture went out to the distributors, Pathé Exchange, or later, Metro-Goldwyn-Mayer.

Walker was a chain-smoking eccentric, a cat fanatic whose office always had a few tabbies in residence. His exterior was gruff and he was often difficult to get along with. Director Tay Garnett had an early-career one-day trial as an assistant writer to Walker, whose only reaction to Garnett's efforts was a guttural "yeah." Then, Garnett, "who soon discovered Walker's 'yeah's to be the equivalent to a round of applause, was told 'Come back tomorrow—on salary.'" Film editor Richard Currier recounted that Walker never drove a car, so his wife had to drive him to work every day. But Currier was fond of Walker, calling him "a prince of a guy," and remembered the present of a dictionary with a note that read like one of Walker's title cards: "Having listened for years to your astonishing, and, at times, highly-charged vocabulary, I hasten to add to your voltage."

As sound came to motion pictures, Walker and his staff were writing cards for Roach series including the Our Gang and Laurel and Hardy comedy short subjects. But as witty as his title cards had been, Walker was less adept at writing spoken dialogue for talkies. "Much of his work for Laurel and Hardy was so unwieldy and out of character that complete on-set revision was necessary," says The Laurel and Hardy Encyclopedia. Laurel and Hardy scholar Randy Skretvedt writes that Walker's "contribution to the L&H films was relatively minor" and that comparison of the "action" and "dialogue" scripts with the finished film "usually reveals that most of Walker's dialogue went unused."

One discarded example of dialogue was from an early Laurel and Hardy sound short Hog Wild (1930) when Mrs Hardy chats to her husband about looking for the hat that is perched on his head (as he is suffering from amnesia):

Mrs Hardy: "You must've put it somewhere! Hats don't walk!"

Ollie: "Why not? They feel don't they? You've heard of felt hats, haven't you? (savagely) Haw, haw, haw!"

Mrs Hardy: "Well well, America's greatest humorist is in again."

Skredtvedt stated that the dialogue in the released film was "far less 'gaggy', and much more amusing."

A turning point was reached at Roach in 1931 with the arrival of a new general manager, Henry Ginsburg, a boorish man universally despised on the lot and called by Stan Laurel "The Expeditor". Ginsburg's every move was aimed at cutting costs, often at great harm to the studio's creative output. One of the first casualties was cameraman George Stevens, who would go on to win two Oscars for Best Director. Among the next was Beanie Walker, who resigned after sixteen years over disputes with Ginsburg's cost-cutting edicts.

After leaving the Roach studio, Walker wrote dialogue for comedies produced by ex-Roach general manager Warren Doane at Universal Pictures. Later, he worked at Paramount Pictures, where he contributed to the W. C. Fields picture The Old Fashioned Way (1934).

== Death ==
Walker died of a heart attack on June 23, 1937, four days short of his 59th birthday, while dining in the Chicago apartment of Leroy Shield, his friend and composer of much of the Roach Studio's music.
