= Jackie Condon =

American child actor (1918–1977)

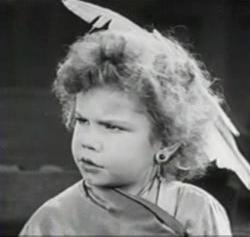
- Condon in Dogs of War (1923)
- Born: John Michael Condon; March 25, 1918; Los Angeles, California, U.S.
- Died: October 13, 1977 (aged 59); Inglewood, California, U.S.
- Occupation: Actor
- Years active: 1919 – 1967
- Family: (Siblings): Geraldine Condon; Billy Condon

John Michael Condon (March 25, 1918 – October 13, 1977) credited as Jackie Condon was an American child actor who was a regular in the Our Gang short series as an original cast member from 1922 until 1929, during the Hal Roach produced Pathé silent era.

== Biography ==
Condon was born in March 1918 in Los Angeles, California. In 1919, he began his acting career by appearing in the film Jinx. By 1922, he had appeared in many silent films and later starred in the Our Gang comedies as "Jackie".

When he joined the original Our Gang ensemble in 1921, Condon was a little, tag-along toddler who, although often put off by the older children, was anxious to participate in the gang's adventures. As he grew older, Condon's character developed into a more All American type. Condon left the series in 1928, after appearing in all 66 Pathé silent comedies and 12 of the Metro-Goldwyn-Mayer silent comedies.

After he left Our Gang, Condon attended public school and in 1936 graduated from Hollywood High School in Los Angeles, California. In a 1953 episode of the television program You Asked for It, Condon stated he was studying dramatics with Florence Enright and hoped to return to acting, although there is no evidence he did so. Condon worked at Rockwell International with fellow Our Gang alumni and co-star Joe Cobb. In 1977, Condon died at age 59 from colon cancer.

== Selected filmography ==
- Jinx (1919) - uncredited
- Little Lord Fauntleroy (1921) - boy at opening scene with hat
- Dr. Jack (1922) - neighborhood kid
- One Terrible Day (1922) - Jackie
- The Champeen (1923) - Jackie
- Tire Trouble (1924) - Jackie
- The Big Town (1925) - Jackie
- Good Cheer (1926) - Jackie
- Bring Home the Turkey (1927) - Jackie
- Barnum & Ringling, Inc. (1928) - Jackie
- Election Day (1929) - Jackie

== Bibliography ==
- Holmstrom, John. The Moving Picture Boy: An International Encyclopaedia from 1895 to 1995, Norwich, Michael Russell, 1996, p. 86.
- Dye, David. Child and Youth Actors: Filmography of Their Entire Careers, 1914-1985. Jefferson, NC: McFarland & Co., 1988, pp. 35–36.
