= Joe Cobb (actor) =

American actor (1916–2002)

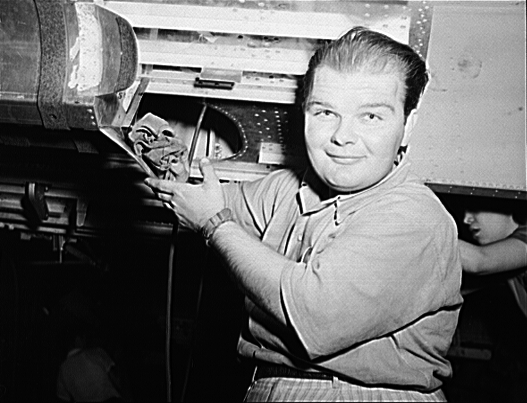
- Cobb building a B-25 Mitchell bomber during WW2, circa 1944-45
- Born: Joe Frank Cobb; November 7, 1916; Shawnee, Oklahoma, U.S.
- Died: May 21, 2002 (aged 85); Santa Ana, California, U.S.
- Occupation: Child actor
- Years active: 1923–early 1940s

Joe Frank Cobb (November 7, 1916 – May 21, 2002) was an American child actor, most notable for appearing as the original "fat boy" in the Our Gang comedies from 1922 to 1929.

== Early life and career ==
Born in Shawnee, Oklahoma, on November 7, 1916, Cobb auditioned for producer Hal Roach's Our Gang comedy series at the age of five in 1921. He first worked with the series in 1922, appearing in The Champeen (1923) and The Big Show (1923).

Cobb appeared in the Our Gang series' last silent film, Saturday's Lesson, and its first talking short, Small Talk, both in 1929.

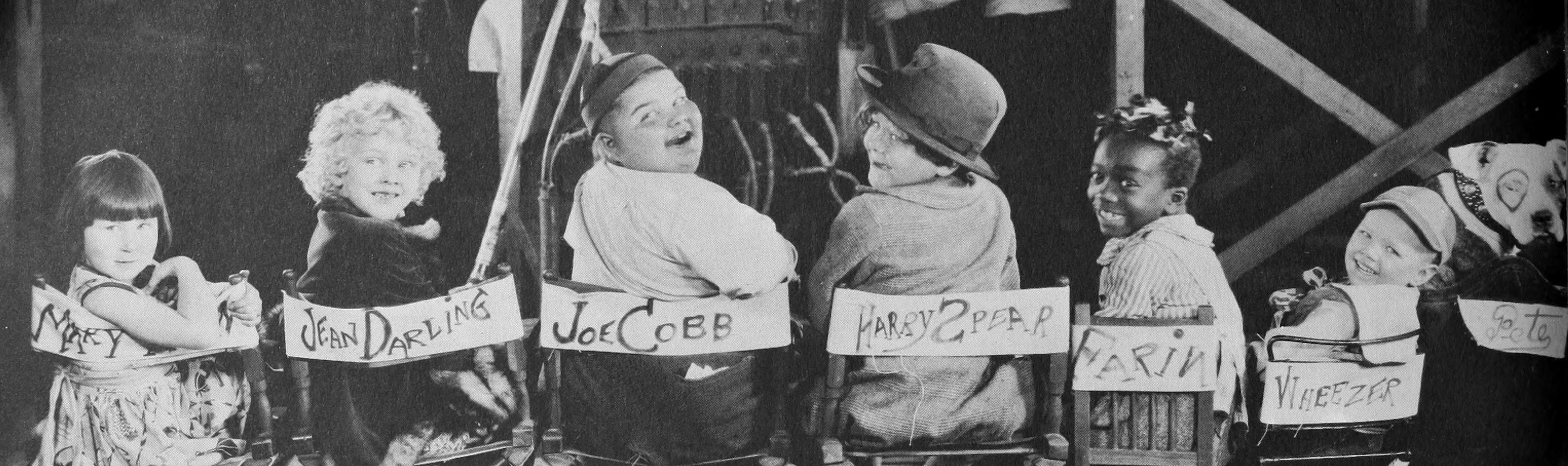
Our Gang 1929

His penultimate episode as a regular cast member was Boxing Gloves (1929) when he was 12. Joining him in that film (a remake of The Champeen) is "Chubby" (14-year-old Norman Chaney), Cobb's successor as the "fat kid", and Jackie Cooper in his film debut.

Cobb's final regular Our Gang appearance was in the Lazy Days episode (released August 4, 1929). He appeared in 86 Our Gang films during the seven years from 1922 to 1929. He also made three cameo appearances during the 1930s, in Fish Hooky (1933), Pay as You Exit (1936), and Reunion in Rhythm (1937).

After his acting career ended in the early 1940s, Cobb became an assembler for North American Aviation, a division of Rockwell International in Downey, California. He retired in 1981 at age 65.

== Death ==
Cobb died on May 21, 2002, in a convalescent home in Santa Ana, California.
