= Big Ears =

1931 film

- Directed by: Robert F. McGowan
- Written by: H. M. Walker
- Produced by: Robert F. McGowan; Hal Roach
- Cinematography: Art Lloyd
- Edited by: Richard C. Currier
- Music by: Leroy Shield; Marvin Hatley
- Distributed by: MGM
- Release date: August 29, 1931
- Running time: 20' 47"
- Country: United States
- Language: English

Big Ears is a 1931 Our Gang short comedy film directed by Robert F. McGowan. It was the 108th Our Gang short to be released.

== Plot ==
Wheezer's mother and father continue to fight in an unconvincing and thoroughly hammy fashion over many different silly things, such as the coffee being too cold or the toast being burned. Wheezer overhears his father telling his mother that he is getting her a divorce. Not knowing what a divorce is, Wheezer tells Stymie, Dorothy, and Sherwood. They speculate on what a divorce means, at one point deciding it might be something good. Then Donald tells the gang what a divorce is, and people start sobbing. He even tells Wheezer that he will have no father anymore. His mother might either remarry and give him a stepfather and states that his step father beats him regularly. He also says that maybe his mother will throw him into an orphanage and not want him anymore.

Wheezer is frightened so he concocts a plot to make himself abominably sick so that his parents will come together out of concern from him. Wheezer visits a bathroom and his friends pour all the medicine in the medicine cabinet down his throat to make him ill, along with amounts of lard. He indeed gets sick and his plan presumably works. His parents kiss and make up and promise to never fight again and that they love Wheezer very much.

== Notes ==
- Big Ears marked a turnover with Allen Hoskins, Mary Ann Jackson, Norman Chaney, and Shirley Jean Rickert all leaving the gang. Jackie Cooper left shortly before the last episode, Fly My Kite. This left Bobby Hutchins as the only full-time Our Ganger left from the silent film era. A few fill-in recurring kids were also left from the silent era and the "Jackie Cooper era". Mary Ann's brother Dickie would remain for another two years as a recurring character. It also marked the first episode for Sherwood Bailey, who would have a featured role a few months later in Dogs is Dogs.
- Big Ears was removed from the syndicated Little Rascals television package in 1971 primarily due to its depiction of a dangerous misuse of prescription drugs. Unlike most other episodes, this film was never available on home video until 1995, when it was released on VHS tape.

== Cast ==
=== The Gang ===
- Bobby Hutchins as Wheezer
- Matthew Beard as Stymie
- Sherwood Bailey as Spud
- Dorothy DeBorba as Dorothy
- Donald Haines as Donald
- Pete the Pup as Himself

=== Additional cast ===
- Johnnie Mae Beard as Stymie's mother
- Ann Christy as Wheezer's mother
- Gordon Douglas as Orderly
- Creighton Hale as Wheezer's father
- Wilfred Lucas as Doctor
- Dickie Jackson as Kid at hospital (scene deleted)

== See also ==
- Our Gang filmography
