= Choo-Choo! =

1932 film

- Title card
- Directed by: Robert F. McGowan
- Written by: Hal Roach; H. M. Walker
- Produced by: Robert F. McGowan; Hal Roach
- Starring: George McFarland
- Cinematography: Art Lloyd
- Edited by: Richard C. Currier
- Music by: Leroy Shield
- Distributed by: MGM
- Release date: March 7, 1932
- Running time: 20 minutes
- Country: United States
- Language: English

Choo-Choo! is a 1932 Our Gang short comedy film directed by Robert F. McGowan. It was the 114th Our Gang short to be released. It is a remake of the 1923 Our Gang film A Pleasant Journey.

== Plot ==
Exchanging clothes with a group of runaway orphans who escape from a train, the gang ends up on a train headed for Chicago. Pressed into service as the kids' supervisor, Travelers Aid attendant Mr. Henderson (Dell Henderson) suffers torment, especially when he tries to prevent three-year-old Spanky from socking the nose of every adult in sight.

Things come to a head late that night when Stymie accidentally releases a monkey from its cage, and the monkey in turn releases a menagerie of circus animals from the baggage car and then lights some fireworks. When the train reaches its destination the next morning, Mr. Henderson receives a telegram saying that he has the wrong children and must bring them back on a train to California.

== Cast ==
=== The Gang ===
- George McFarland as Spanky
- Sherwood Bailey as Spud
- Matthew Beard as Stymie
- Dorothy DeBorba as Dorothy
- Bobby Hutchins as Wheezer
- Kendall McComas as Breezy Brisbane
- Harold Wertz as Bouncy
- Pete the Pup as Himself

=== Additional cast ===
- Dell Henderson as Mr. Henderson
- Donald Haines as Leader of the runaway orphans
- Wally Albright as Runaway orphan
- Georgie Billings as runaway orphan
- Buddy McDonald as runaway orphan
- Douglas Greer as runaway orphan
- Bobby Mallon as runaway orphan
- Eddie Baker as Officer
- Harry Bernard as Pullman conductor
- Silas D. Wilcox as Pullman attendant
- Estelle Etterre as Dorothy's mother
- Otto Fries as Inebriated novelties salesman
  - Oliver Hardy as inebriated novelties salesman yelling as bear licks his face (voice only)
- Lyle Tayo as Secretary
- Baldwin Cooke as Extra on train

== See also ==
- Our Gang filmography
