= Spanky (film) =

1932 film

- Directed by: Robert F. McGowan
- Written by: Hal Roach; H. M. Walker
- Produced by: Robert F. McGowan; Hal Roach
- Cinematography: Art Lloyd
- Edited by: Richard C. Currier
- Music by: Leroy Shield; Marvin Hatley
- Distributed by: Metro-Goldwyn-Mayer
- Release date: March 26, 1932
- Running time: 19:37
- Country: United States
- Language: English

Spanky is a 1932 Our Gang short comedy film directed by Robert F. McGowan. It was the 113th Our Gang short to be released. The film focuses on Our Gang co-star George "Spanky" McFarland.

== Plot ==
Although this is a remake of a 1920s silent Our Gang episode called Uncle Tom's Uncle, the main character is Spanky. Early scenes of this film were part of Spanky's screen test taken back in April 1931 during his first visit to Hal Roach Studios, which included him "bug hunting." Meanwhile, Spanky's brother Breezy Brisbane and the rest of the gang are putting on a play of Uncle Tom's Cabin. At the same time, Brisbane is forced to babysit Spanky while their mother goes on a shopping trip. Also, Spanky's father refuses to spend money in order to keep the house clean, although he has an enormous amount of cash hidden in a secret door embedded in the wall.

Spanky disrupts the play during the whole time and the play itself is a flop and the kids that came to watch it ruin the play even more by throwing rotten tomatoes and garbage at the gang as they are trying to put the show on. Spanky also finds his dad's money and begins throwing it out the window. The kids all run out and try to steal the money and Spanky's dad arrives and throws the kids out, forcing them to give back the money. The gang helps pick up the money and the father promises to put the money in the bank and spend more on mom and the kids.

== Cast ==
=== The Gang ===
- George McFarland as Spanky
- Sherwood Bailey as Sherwood 'Spud' / Aunt Ophelia
- Matthew Beard as Stymie / Uncle Tom / Topsy
- Dorothy DeBorba as Dorothy / Little Eva
- Bobby Hutchins as Wheezer / Marks the Lawyer
- Kendall McComas as Breezy Brisbane / Simon Legree
- Pete the Pup as Petie

=== Additional cast ===
- Douglas Greer as Speck, tough kid in the audience
- Bobby Mallon as Other tough kid in the audience
- Billy Gilbert as Spanky's father

== Production notes ==
Spanky is a remake of the 1926 silent entry Uncle Tom's Uncle. Bobby Mallon appeared in both films.

On the syndicated television print, 12 minutes of this short, which are the scenes of Uncle Tom's Cabin, were edited out in 1971 making the film only nine minutes long. This was due to material deemed racially insensitive toward African Americans, as the play starts with a number of the children in blackface, and it includes Stymie getting horsewhipped by the slavemaster. Spanky has been released on VHS and DVD in unedited form.

== See also ==
- Our Gang filmography
