= Mush and Milk =

- Directed by: Robert F. McGowan
- Written by: Carl Harbaugh; Hal Roach; H. M. Walker; Hal Yates
- Produced by: F. Richard Jones; Hal Roach
- Cinematography: Hap Depew
- Edited by: Louis McManus
- Music by: Leroy Shield; Marvin Hatley
- Distributed by: Metro-Goldwyn-Mayer
- Release date: May 27, 1933
- Running time: 18:02
- Country: United States
- Language: English

Mush and Milk is a comedy short subject; part of the Our Gang (Little Rascals) series. It was produced and directed by Robert F. McGowan for Hal Roach, and was originally released to theaters by Metro-Goldwyn-Mayer on May 27, 1933. It was the 123rd Our Gang short to be released.

== Plot ==
The children live in the Bleak Hill boarding school, whose ghastly old headmistress constantly punishes and berates them. As they wake up one morning, having improvised a variety of methods to keep warm in their beds, she orders them to get to their chores or face a beating and no breakfast. Her husband, the kindly old Cap, serves as the children's schoolteacher. He promises them that once his back pension comes in, he will take them away from the school so they can all live well.

The children milk a cow using a vacuum cleaner, but their dog Pete knocks over the bucket. To avoid punishment, they mix powdered plaster of Paris into a bucket of water so that the headmistress will think it is milk. At breakfast, they pass the word among themselves not to drink the milk, making up an excuse that it has spoiled. When Spanky innocently tells the headmistress, she scolds the children and orders them to put the milk on their mush and eat it. The plaster quickly sets up, leaving them with slabs of plaster and mush in their bowls and stuck on their spoons.

Cap leads the children through a class session of humorously inaccurate questions and answers, then has them put on an impromptu talent show that culminates in Tommy belting out a rendition of "Just Friends" with adult-oriented lyrics. Spanky answers a telephone call during class; it is Mr. Brown, the bank manager, who wants to speak to Cap. Following a comical exchange, Mr. Brown gets Spanky to put Cap on the line and tells him that his back pension has come in, totaling nearly $4,000. Cap, ecstatic, treats the children to an amusement park visit, a wide variety of toys, and dinner at a fancy French restaurant. He orders a meal for everyone, not knowing exactly what it is. The food turns out to be mush, which Cap disgustedly throws in the waiter's face.

== Cast ==
=== The Gang ===
- Matthew Beard as Stymie
- Tommy Bond as Tommy
- Dorothy DeBorba as Dorothy
- Bobby Hutchins as Wheezer
- George McFarland as Spanky
- Dickie Moore as Dick
- John Collum as Uh-huh
- Edith Fellows as Girl in kitchen
- Bill Farnum as Billy
- Dickie Jackson as Dickie
- Marcia Mae Jones as Our Gang member
- Olga Therkow as Olga
- Pete the Pup as himself

=== Additional cast ===
- Gus Leonard as Cap, teacher
- Louise Emmons as Cap's wife, the Headmistress
- James Finlayson as Mr. Brown, the banker
- Rolfe Sedan as Waiter
- Joe the Monk as Monkey

== Production notes ==
- Mush and Milk marked the last appearances of Bobby Hutchins, Dorothy DeBorba, Dickie Jackson (Mary Ann Jackson's brother), and Dickie Moore in the Our Gang series. Wheezer was the last regular full-time Our Ganger left from the silent era.
- Mush and Milk was the last Our Gang episode to exclusively use music scores by Leroy Shield. Bedtime Worries, the next episode would begin to incorporate scenes without music and focus more on dialogue than films from previous years. The look and feel of the series would begin changing the next season.
- While the gang are students at Bleak Hill Boarding School, the environment seems more like an orphanage and the film appears to be portraying the kids as orphans rather than students.
- This film was edited due to negative treatment towards children and negative, stereotypical misconceptions of old people from syndicated Little Rascals television package in 1971. The edited portions were reinstated in 2001 on AMC and aired there from 2001 to 2003.

== See also ==
- Our Gang filmography
