= Little Daddy =

1931 film by Robert F. McGowan

- Theatrical release poster
- Directed by: Robert F. McGowan
- Written by: H. M. Walker
- Produced by: Robert F. McGowan; Hal Roach
- Cinematography: Art Lloyd
- Edited by: Richard C. Currier
- Music by: Leroy Shield; Marvin Hatley
- Production company: Hal Roach Studios
- Distributed by: Metro-Goldwyn-Mayer
- Release date: March 28, 1931
- Running time: 20' 56"
- Country: United States
- Language: English

Little Daddy is a 1931 Our Gang short comedy film directed by Robert F. McGowan. It was the 105th Our Gang short to be released.

== Plot ==
Little Daddy (1931)

Farina and Stymie are orphans and staying in a small flat near a Black community church. The authorities want to put Stymie into an orphanage. Farina is sad about this but attempts to have a goodbye for Stymie with help from the gang. As Farina gets the food set up, Stymie eats it quicker than the gang could arrive. As the gang arrives, a man from the orphanage arrives to take Stymie to the home. The gang then attacks him in order to stop him from taking Stymie away. Miss Crabtree, their teacher, arrives on the scene and presumably settles matters.

== Notes ==
- Little Daddy was removed from the Little Rascals television package due to perceived racism toward African Americans.
- This was the last appearance of Bobby Young, who portrayed "Bonedust".

== Cast ==
=== The Gang ===
- Matthew Beard as Stymie
- Allen Hoskins as Farina
- Norman Chaney as Chubby
- Jackie Cooper as Jackie
- Dorothy DeBorba as Dorothy
- Bobby Hutchins as Wheezer
- Mary Ann Jackson as Mary Ann
- Shirley Jean Rickert as Shirley
- Douglas Greer as Douglas
- Donald Haines as Donald
- Bobby Young as Bonedust
- Pete the Pup as himself

=== Additional cast ===
- Charley Chase as Chubby's singing voice
- Otto Fries as Orphan asylum agent
- June Marlowe as Miss Crabtree
- George Reed as The Parson
- The Etude Ethiopian Chorus as Church parishioners

== See also ==
- Our Gang filmography
