= Readin' and Writin' =

1932 film

- Directed by: Robert F. McGowan
- Written by: H. M. Walker
- Produced by: Robert F. McGowan; Hal Roach
- Cinematography: Art Lloyd
- Edited by: Richard C. Currier
- Music by: Leroy Shield; Marvin Hatley
- Distributed by: MGM
- Release date: February 2, 1932
- Running time: 20:47
- Country: United States
- Language: English

Readin' and Writin' is a 1932 Our Gang short comedy film directed by Robert F. McGowan. It was the 111th Our Gang short to be released.

== Plot ==
It is the first day of school and children are beginning school for the first time. Breezy Brisbane is returning for another year. His mother tells him that he is to study hard in school and that he will be president some day. He answers back that he does not want to be president and wants to be a street car conductor, because "Boy, do they pick up the nickels!" Brisbane then visits the blacksmith who gives him some encouraging words. Brisbane makes a wise remark, angering the blacksmith who tells Brisbane of a kid that got expelled back when he was a child. Brisbane then gets some bright ideas to get himself kicked out of school.

Brisbane tells Stymie to call Miss Crabtree "Crabby", tells Dorothy to give Miss Crabtree a note stating she is hard of hearing, and tells Wheezer to answer questions rudely. Brisbane also puts tacks on the seats, glues Miss Crabtree's books together, and blows a loud horn in the classroom.

Spud then recites a poem honoring the teacher. Brisbane then throws a spitball at Sherwood. Miss Crabtree sends Brisbane out in the hall. Brisbane then brings Dinah the Mule inside the schoolroom. Miss Crabtree then punishes Brisbane and tells him to learn Sherwood's poem and recite every verse to the class. Brisbane refuses and Miss Crabtree suspends him pending expulsion. Brisbane then realizes that being out of school with no one to play with and nothing to do is not all that much fun. He then learns the poem and sincerely apologizes to Miss Crabtree. She still makes him recite the poem and he does so in tears. Then Marmalade accidentally brings in a skunk from outside and it sprays, sending the class all outside and eliciting a bugeyed reaction from Pete the Pup.

== Note ==
- Readin' and Writin' marked the final appearance of June Marlowe as Miss Crabtree. It also marked the debut appearance of Kendall McComas as Breezy Brisbane. The wise-cracking Brisbane character was created to replace Jackie Cooper who left the series in 1931 to do feature films. While the central character in Readin' and Writin' , McComas received only minor speaking roles throughout the year. Already in his teens by the time he joined the Our Gang series, McComas departed in late 1932.
- A few minutes were edited out of the Little Rascals television package back in 1971 because of the stereotyped portrayals of the time period toward African Americans, and a few other scenes were deemed to simply be in bad taste. These scenes were reinstated in 2001 when shown on AMC until 2003.

== Cast ==
=== The Gang ===
- Bobby Hutchins as Wheezer
- Matthew Beard as Stymie
- Dorothy DeBorba as Dorothy
- Kendall McComas as Breezy Brisbane
- Sherwood Bailey as Sherwood 'Spud'
- Pete the Pup as himself

=== Additional cast ===
- Carlena Beard as Marmalade
- Patsy Britten as Patsy
- Donald Haines as Donald
- Harry Bernard as The fruit vendor
- Otto Fries as The blacksmith
- June Marlowe as Miss June Crabtree
- Lyle Tayo as Breezy's mother
- May Wallace as Wheezer's mother

== See also ==
- Our Gang filmography
