= Bargain Day =

1931 film

- Directed by: Robert F. McGowan
- Written by: H. M. Walker
- Produced by: Robert F. McGowan; Hal Roach
- Cinematography: Art Lloyd
- Edited by: Richard Currier
- Music by: Leroy Shield; Marvin Hatley
- Distributed by: MGM
- Release date: May 2, 1931
- Running time: 18' 47"
- Country: United States
- Language: English

Bargain Day is a 1931 Our Gang short comedy film directed by Robert F. McGowan. It was the 106th Our Gang short to be released.

== Plot ==
Jackie notices that the Gang's baseball equipment is missing and discovers Wheezer and Stymie were peddling it, along with other items, from door to door. Wheezer, Stymie, and Bologna arrive at a rich family's home and try to sell a bunch of junk to a little girl named Shirley. Stymie wanders off playing with a pet monkey and a toy lion, and sets off a burglar alarm.

Jackie, Chubby, Mary Ann, Farina, Dorothy, and Speck arrive at the house and Chubby gets locked in a steam cabinet. Police arrive to investigate and find the Gang there.

== Notes ==
- Bargain Day was whittled down to 10 minutes in length on the Little Rascals television prints beginning in 1971. Scenes involving Stymie wandering throughout the house were excised due to perceived racism toward African-Americans. The edited portions were mostly reinstated in 2001 on prints shown on AMC from 2001 to 2003.
- Bargain Day was the last appearance of Jackie Cooper, who loaned to Paramount Pictures to appear in the film Skippy.

== Cast ==
=== The Gang ===
- Matthew Beard as Stymie/Pansy's speaking voice
- Norman Chaney as Chubby
- Jackie Cooper as Jackie
- Dorothy DeBorba as Dorothy
- Allen Hoskins as Farina
- Bobby Hutchins as Wheezer
- Mary Ann Jackson as Mary Ann
- Shirley Jean Rickert as Shirley
- Donald Haines as Speck
- Pete the Pup as himself

=== Additional cast ===
- Harry Bernard as Sales clerk
- Baldwin Cooke as Socks customer
- Otto Fries as Plainclothes policeman
- Douglas Greer as a kid
- Tiny Sandford as Police captain
- Mickey Daniels as Laugh-over for Pansy

== See also ==
- Our Gang filmography
