= Helping Grandma =

1931 short film by Robert F. McGowan

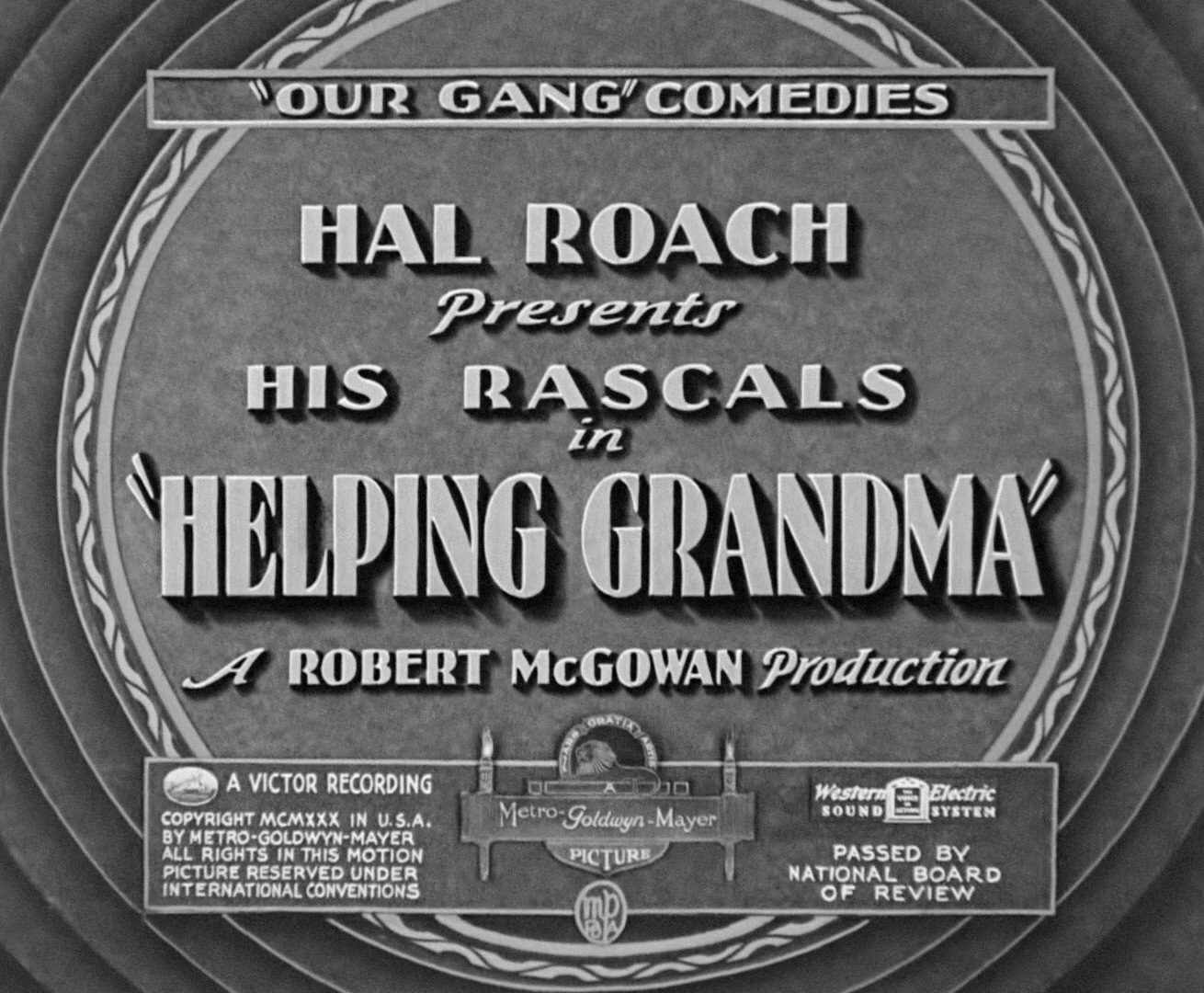
- Directed by: Robert F. McGowan
- Written by: H. M. Walker
- Produced by: Robert F. McGowan; Hal Roach
- Cinematography: Art Lloyd
- Edited by: Richard C. Currier
- Music by: Leroy Shield; Marvin Hatley
- Distributed by: Metro-Goldwyn-Mayer
- Release date: January 3, 1931
- Running time: 20:47
- Country: United States
- Language: English

Helping Grandma is a 1931 Our Gang short comedy film directed by Robert F. McGowan. It was the 103rd Our Gang short to be released.

== Plot ==
Helping Grandma (1931)

An elderly woman, Mrs. Margaret Mack, owns a small grocery store, and the gang helps her to run it by waiting on customers, delivering groceries and keeping her company. They call her Grandma, although she is not any one kid's grandmother. She loves the gang, and the gang loves her.

A chain store company wants to buy her store for more than market value, while a swindler also wants to buy it for next to nothing. The gang thinks both parties want to practically steal the store from her. The swindler stops in and tries talking Grandma into selling her store immediately for $1,500. She balks at the low price, then goes downtown to run some errands, leaving the gang in charge. Among her instructions is to tell anyone who calls on the telephone to call back later.

Chain store officials stop by, and Jackie, Farina and Chubby try deterring them from buying the store, telling them, among other things, "You couldn't sell many chains in this town anyhow," and, "Even the banks close on Saturday afternoon". The chain store officials are amused by the kids and leave some papers for Mrs. Mack to study. After they leave, the swindler returns, sees it is a $3,500 contract of sale, and swipes it.

Meanwhile, Stymie is supposed to get ten cents worth of "it", but can't remember what "it" is. He has a note naming it, but neither he nor Wheezer can read the note, so Wheezer asks Stymie if he would remember it if he saw it. Stymie says no, but that he might remember it if he tasted it. So, Wheezer and the other kids have Stymie sample a potato, Peet Bros., soap, shoe polish, gasoline, moth balls, glue, Limburger cheese, and, finally, fish-meal fertilizer, to which Stymie declares, "Yep, that's it".

Dorothy is doling out candy to Wheezer when the phone rings. It is the chain store representatives, who want to increase their offer. Wheezer picks up the receiver, but does not speak to the representatives because he is distracted by Dorothy. Thinking she is not giving him enough candy (and, therefore, not hearing their offer), Wheezer shouts at Dorothy, "T'aint enough!", then into the phone, "Call later!". The chain store reps think that "T'aint enough" was meant for them, so they decide they will call back. This gag takes place repeatedly through the scene, with the chain store guys increasing their price to, finally, a "flat offer of $5,000.00".

Grandma returns with the swindler, who is in a rush to have her sign away her store. After several interruptions by the children, she signs the paper. Assuming she has signed the store away, she informs the kids. The man refers to the kids as hoodlums and tells them they must leave, to which Grandma objects. The chain store officials arrive, and the swindler states that the store now belongs to him. He shows them the paper she signed, but it is blank. The real contract of sale was not signed, so the swindler accuses Grandma of tricking him.

The officials repeat their phone bid, saying they will give Grandma $1,500 more than the original price agreed on. Grandma realizes that the swindler had imitated her over the phone, so she punches the guy across the room. When he threatens Grandma, Wheezer hits him on the head with a hammer.

== Cast ==
=== The Gang ===
- Matthew Beard as Stymie ('Tumble-Weed' in script)
- Norman Chaney as Chubby
- Jackie Cooper as Jackie
- Dorothy DeBorba as Dorothy
- Allen Hoskins as Farina
- Bobby Hutchins as Wheezer
- Mary Ann Jackson as Mary Ann
- Shirley Jean Rickert as Shirley
- Donald Haines as Donald
- Clifton Young as Robert 'Bonedust'

=== Additional cast ===
- Oscar Apfel as Mr. Pennypacker
- William Gillespie as Billy, second chain store official
- Dell Henderson as First chain store official
- Margaret Mann as Mrs. Margaret 'Grandma' Mack
- Bobby Mallon as Undetermined role

== Note ==
This episode was heavily edited for The Little Rascals television syndicated prints, beginning in 1971. Scenes with Stymie tasting the store items were all cut, due to perceptions of racism toward African-Americans. Most, but not all, of the deleted scenes were reinstated for the TV prints aired on AMC 2001-2003, and on MeTV in 2016.

== See also ==
- Our Gang filmography
