= Donald Haines =

American actor (1919–1943)

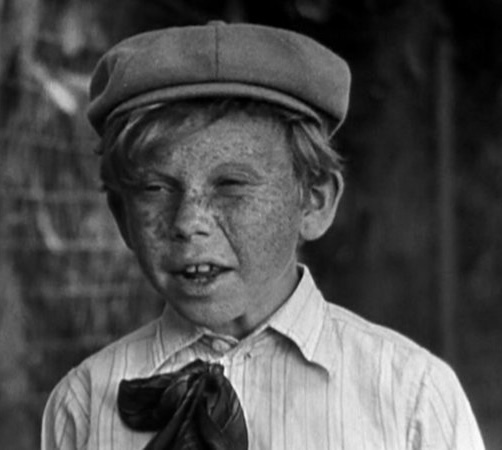
- Haines in School's Out (1930)
- Born: May 9, 1919; Seward County, Nebraska, U.S.
- Died: February 20, 1943 (aged 23); North Africa
- Cause of death: Killed in action
- Resting place: Inglewood Park Cemetery
- Occupation: Actor
- Years active: 1929–1943

Donald Haines (May 9, 1919 – February 20, 1943) was an American child actor who appeared regularly in four different series of comedy films, including the Our Gang and East Side Kids movies.

== Early years ==
Haines was born in Seward County, Nebraska, the son of Karl and Nola Haines. The family moved to California by the end of 1927, when Haines was eight years old.

== Smitty and His Pals ==
In 1928 the independent movie producer Amedee J. Van Beuren and the vaudeville agent Harry Weber adapted Walter Berndt's comic strip Smitty for Pathé Exchange, which needed comedy short subjects after losing distribution deals with Hal Roach and Mack Sennett. Weber cast Haines as “Smitty,” office boy and older brother in a family of four. The Albany Times-Union reported the boy was chosen for his “unnumbered” freckles, “snubby nose and characteristic smile.”

Haines appeared in all ten “Smitty and His Pals” shorts released in 1928 and 1929, from No Picnic to Uncle’s Visit. Each of these movies had a notable guest star, such as the boxer Jack Dempsey and the comedians Lloyd Hamilton, Billy Bevan, and James Finlayson. Critics complained that the later films were nowhere near as good as the first few, directed by George Marshall. The series ended as Hollywood production shifted to sound. Only some of these films are known to have survived.

== Kid-Gang Comedies ==
Late in 1929, Haines began working in the Hal Roach Studio’s Our Gang films. He appeared first in the large ensemble of Shivering Shakespeare, then played Jackie Cooper’s rival for Mary Ann Jackson’s affection in The First Seven Years. Haines was not a core member of the cast, appearing in every film, but tended to be brought in when a story called for lots of kids or an antagonist.

In the middle of filming Bargain Day, Haines and Jackie Cooper were hired away by Paramount to make Skippy, a feature based on Percy Crosby’s comic strip. The Los Angeles Examiner reported that Haines was cast “Because he is supposed to have more freckles than any other boy in motion pictures.” Cooper starred as “Skippy” while Haines played his nemesis “Harley Nubbins,” the dog catcher’s son. The Knoxville News-Sentinel called Haines “particularly good,” and the Canton Repository said he “did a fine job with a disagreeable role.”

While Cooper went on to make a Skippy sequel and become one of Metro-Goldwyn-Mayer’s top child stars, Haines returned to the Our Gang series for seven more films, through Fish Hooky in 1933. Among his distinctive moments were explaining divorce badly to Bobby “Wheezer” Hutchins in Big Ears and having cake smashed in his face in Free Eats. His character was often called “Donald,” sometimes “Speck” for his freckles, and once “Toughie.” Haines’s other castmates included Norman "Chubby" Chaney, Allen "Farina" Hoskins, Matthew "Stymie" Beard, Dorothy DeBorba, Kendall McComas, Dickie Moore, and George "Spanky" McFarland.

In 1931–1932, Mickey Rooney was unavailable for the Mickey McGuire series, and the producers moved Marvin Stephens up to the title role of “Mickey.” That opened Stephens’s usual character of “Katrink’,” the immensely strong boy. Haines stepped into that part, acting in six shorts before Rooney and Stephens returned to their previous slots. Moviegoers thus saw Haines in both of Hollywood’s leading kid-gang comedy series simultaneously.

== Feature Films ==
For most of the 1930s Haines played small roles in feature films, including Manhattan Melodrama, A Tale of Two Cities (as Jerry Cruncher, Jr.), Little Lord Fauntleroy, and Boys Town. He regularly appeared opposite Jackie Cooper. In Seventeen the two teens competed for Betty Field’s attention, and studio publicists pointed out they had also played romantic rivals in The First Seven Years a decade before.

In 1940 Sam Katzman produced East Side Kids, a knock-off of the Dead End Kids movies, with Haines as “Pee Wee.” (That nickname was ironic; Haines had filled out and was the beefiest of the gang.) East Side Kids did well enough to launch a series of low-budget features, eventually starring most of the original young actors from Dead End. Haines appeared in seven of those films, through Spooks Run Wild, with his character being renamed “Skinny.”

== Death ==
On December 10, 1941, three days after the attack on Pearl Harbor, Haines enlisted as an aviation cadet in the United States Army Air Forces.

On February 20, 1943, first lieutenant Haines was flying a Bell P-39 Airacobra on a strafing mission against Erwin Rommel's forces during the Battle of Kasserine Pass in Tunisia. His fighter group, the 93rd Fighter Squadron, destroyed a locomotive and train cars, and 34 enemy trucks. Haines failed to return from the mission, and was listed as killed in action.

Haines is memorialized in Inglewood Park Cemetery in Los Angeles.

== Filmography ==
=== Our Gang ===
- Shivering Shakespeare (1930, Short) as Donny (series debut)
- The First Seven Years (1930, Short) as Speck (uncredited)
- Teacher's Pet (1930, Short) as Don (uncredited)
- School's Out (1930, Short) as Donald
- Helping Grandma (1931, Short) as Donald
- Love Business (1931, Short) as Donald
- Little Daddy (1931, Short) as Donald
- Bargain Day (1931, Short) as Donald
- Big Ears (1931, Short) as Donald
- Readin' and Writin' (1932, Short) as Donald
- Free Eats (1932, Short) as Kid Wanting Cake
- Choo-Choo! (1932, Short) as Donald, an orphan
- Birthday Blues (1932, Short) as Boy with mousetrap on lip
- A Lad an' a Lamp (1932, Short) as Toughie
- Fish Hooky (1933, Short) as Donald

=== Film ===
- Skippy (1931) as Harley Nubbins
- When a Feller Needs a Friend (1932) as Fatty Bullen
- No Greater Glory (1934) as Csonakos
- Manhattan Melodrama (1934) as Spud - as a Boy (uncredited)
- Little Man, What Now? (1934) as Emil Kleinholz Jr.
- Now I'll Tell (1934) as Messenger Boy (uncredited)
- Murder in the Private Car (1934) as Boy in Front of Theatre (uncredited)
- Kid Millions (1934) as Kid Band Member (uncredited)
- I'll Fix It (1934) as Boy (uncredited)
- Music in the Air (1934) as Peanut Vendor at Munich Zoo (uncredited)
- The Winning Ticket (1935) as Stubby (uncredited)
- Straight from the Heart (1935) as Neighbor Boy (uncredited)
- Vagabond Lady (1935) as Spear Office Boy (uncredited)
- Ginger (1935) as Butch (uncredited)
- The Nitwits (1935) as Hal - Office Boy (uncredited)
- His Night Out (1935) as Office Boy (uncredited)
- Annie Oakley (1935) as Boy at Shooting Gallery (uncredited)
- A Tale of Two Cities (1935) as Jerry Cruncher Jr.
- Exclusive Story (1936) as Office Boy (uncredited)
- Little Lord Fauntleroy (1936) as Fighting Boy (uncredited)
- Love Before Breakfast (1936) as Boy on Bicycle (uncredited)
- Little Miss Nobody (1936) as Harold Slade
- Bunker Bean (1936) as Jones & Co. Office Boy (uncredited)
- Daniel Boone (1936) as man Being Burned at The Stake (uncredited)
- Two Wise Maids (1937) as Schoolboy (uncredited)
- Rhythm in the Clouds (1937) as Office Boy (uncredited)
- Public Wedding (1937) as Boy Selling Confetti (uncredited)
- Super-Sleuth (1937) as Second Newsboy (uncredited)
- Love and Hisses (1937) as Newsboy (uncredited)
- Kidnapped (1938) as Ransome
- Three Comrades (1938) as Jupp - Boy Running for Help (uncredited)
- Reformatory (1938) as Inmate (uncredited)
- Boys Town (1938) as Alabama (uncredited)
- Down on the Farm (1938) as Boy in Drug Store (uncredited)
- Sergeant Madden (1939) as Milton
- Never Say Die (1939) as Julius - Bellhop (uncredited)
- On Your Toes (1939) as Elevator Operator (uncredited)
- East Side Kids (1940) as PeeWee
- Seventeen (1940) as Joe Bullitt
- The Return of Wild Bill (1940) as Bobby
- Boys of the City (1940) as Peewee
- That Gang of Mine (1940) as Skinny
- Fugitive from a Prison Camp (1940) as Burly Bascomb
- Melody Ranch (1940) as Callboy (uncredited)
- Pride of the Bowery (1940) as Skinny
- Flying Wild (1941) as Skinny
- Bowery Blitzkrieg (1941) as Skinny
- Spooks Run Wild (1941) as Skinny (final film)

== Bibliography ==
- Erickson, Hal (2020). A Van Beuren Production: A History of the 619 Cartoons, 875 Live Action Shorts, Four Feature Films and One Serial of Amedee Van Beuren. McFarland.
- Getz, Leonard (2015). From Broadway to the Bowery: A History and Filmography of the Dead End Kids, Little Tough Guys, East Side Kids and Bowery Boys Films, with Cast Biographies. McFarland. ISBN 9780786487424.
- Holmstrom, John. The Moving Picture Boy: An International Encyclopaedia from 1895 to 1995, Norwich, Michael Russell, 1996, p. 89.
- Maltin, Leonard; Bann, Richard W. (1992). The Little Rascals: The Life and Times of Our Gang.
