= The Kid from Borneo =

1933 film

- Directed by: Robert F. McGowan
- Written by: Carl Harbaugh; Hal Roach; H. M. Walker; Hal Yates
- Produced by: F. Richard Jones; Hal Roach
- Starring: Dickie Moore; George McFarland; Dorothy DeBorba; Matthew Beard; Tommy Bond; Bobby Hutchins; Dickie Jackson; Henry Hanna; Pete the Pup; John Lester Johnson; Harry Bernard; Otto Fries; Dick Gilbert; May Wallace
- Cinematography: Francis Corby
- Edited by: William H. Terhune
- Music by: Leroy Shield; Marvin Hatley
- Distributed by: Metro-Goldwyn-Mayer
- Release date: April 15, 1933
- Running time: 18:41
- Country: United States
- Language: English

The Kid from Borneo is a short subject film in the Our Gang (Little Rascals) comedy series. It was produced and directed by Robert F. McGowan for Hal Roach Studios, and was originally released to theaters by Metro-Goldwyn-Mayer on April 15, 1933. It was the 122nd Our Gang short to be released. When the Little Rascals films aired on television, it was pulled from rotation due to it being "offensive".

== Plot ==
Dickie, Dorothy and Spanky's Uncle George is in town. Uncle George manages a show called "Wild Man from Borneo", featuring a tribal-attired man with the mentality of a seven-year-old child. The children's father refuses to let Uncle George visit, so their mother has the kids visit him at the show's location. Their mother explains to the kids that Uncle George is the black sheep of the family, which is why their father does not want them to see him.

Bumbo a.k.a. "Wild Man From Borneo" / mistaken Uncle George (John Lester Johnson)

The children arrive at the show, where they mistake Bumbo, the Wild Man from Borneo, for their Uncle George. As the children attempt to talk with "Uncle George" and speculate that he might be a cannibal, Bumbo spots Stymie's candy and shouts "Yumm, Yumm Eat-Em-Up!" In an effort to take the candy, Bumbo chases the children (who are now convinced that "Uncle George" is indeed a cannibal) back to their house. Once there, Bumbo repeatedly says “Yumm, Yumm, Eat-Em-Up!” while chasing the kids throughout the house. While in the kitchen with Spanky, Bumbo consumes everything in the refrigerator (including an unopened can of sardines, metal opener and all) and a gallon of wine. The now drunk and knife-wielding Bumbo resumes chasing the children, demolishing much of the home's furniture, and repeatedly shouting "Yumm, Yumm, Eat-Em-Up". The children launch several counter-attacks against Bumbo, and after additional damage is done to the house Bumbo retreats to a bedroom after Spanky attacks him with a Roman candle shot to the derrière.

As the mother arrives and asks the kids where "Uncle George" is, she is directed to the upstairs bedroom. Initially believing the occupant of the bed is the real Uncle George, she screams upon discovering instead the primitive tribesman Bumbo, and is so frightened she jumps head-first out of the second-story window. When the father comes home soon after, Dickie says "Uncle George is upstairs." The dad rolls up his sleeves, vows to punch "Uncle George" in the head (to which Stymie replies, "Oh yeah?!"), and heads upstairs. Expecting to find Uncle George, he encounters instead Bumbo, who shortly thereafter throws the terrified father out the window. Spanky then blasts Bumbo out the same window with the Roman candle, and laughs loudly as he watches Bumbo chase his parents down the street.

== Cast ==
=== The Gang ===
- Matthew Beard as Stymie
- Tommy Bond as Tommy
- Dorothy DeBorba as Dorothy
- Bobby Hutchins as Wheezer
- George McFarland as Spanky
- Dickie Moore as Dickie
- Dickie Jackson as Dick
- Henry Hanna as Henry
- Pete the Pup as himself

=== Additional cast ===
- Harry Bernard as Sideshow manager
- Otto Fries as Kids' Dad
- Dick Gilbert as Worker
- John Lester Johnson as Bumbo, "The Wild Man from Borneo"
- May Wallace as Kids' Mom

== See also ==
- Our Gang filmography
- Wild Men of Borneo
