= Fish Hooky =

1933 film

- Directed by: Robert F. McGowan
- Produced by: Hal Roach
- Cinematography: Art Lloyd
- Edited by: Richard C. Currier
- Music by: Leroy Shield; Marvin Hatley
- Distributed by: Metro-Goldwyn-Mayer
- Release date: January 28, 1933
- Running time: 18' 17"
- Country: United States
- Language: English

Fish Hooky is a 1933 Our Gang short comedy film directed by Robert F. McGowan. It was the 120th Our Gang short to be released.

== Plot ==
Wheezer, Dickie, Uh-huh, and Stymie choose to play hooky from school again to go fishing with Joe and Farina. Meanwhile, Miss Kornman is taking her students to the beach and amusement pier free of charge. Spanky and Cotton deliver sick notes forged for Dickie, Stymie, and Wheezer by Joe and Farina to Miss Kornman, stating why they were absent. She decides to teach the boys a lesson, and asks her old flame who is now the truant officer Mickey Daniels to help her.

Mr. Daniels, meeting up with the boys but not telling them he is the truant officer, then lectures them about what they can expect if sent to reform school (at Christmas, he claims that "everybody gets a brand new sledgehammer!"), and frightens them so much they decide to go to the beach to apologize to Miss Kornman. Mr. Daniels offers to drive them there. En route, Stymie spots the truant officer badge and the boys flee. The officer purposely makes the chase long, but eventually catches all the boys. They beg Miss Kornman to stop Mr. Daniels from locking the boys in a reform school. She does after the boys promise to never play hooky again.

Afterwards, Mr. Daniels asks Miss Kornman for a kiss, but she refuses. As he keeps on begging her, Spanky (who was taking a nap) shouts: "For the love of Pete! Kiss him so I can go to sleep!"

== Cast ==
=== The Gang ===
- Matthew Beard as Stymie
- Dorothy DeBorba as Dorothy
- Bobby Hutchins as Wheezer Hutchins
- George McFarland as Spanky
- Dickie Moore as Dickie Moore
- Bobbie Beard as Cotton
- John Collum as Uh-huh
- Pete the Pup as himself

=== Additional cast ===
- Joe Cobb as Joe
- Mickey Daniels as Mickey Daniels
- Allen Hoskins as Farina
- Mary Kornman as Mary Kornman
- Donald Haines as First kid in class
- Baldwin Cooke as Amusement park barker
- Bobby De War as School kid
- Henry Hanna as School kid
- Mildred Kornman as School kid

== Note ==
Fish Hooky marks cameo appearances of four former Our Gangers, now teenagers. Allen Hoskins (Farina, aged 12) and Joe Cobb (aged 15) play the "older kids" who the Gang follows to the fishing hole. Mary Kornman (teacher) and Mickey Daniels (truant officer) portray adult roles, despite them both being the teenagers as well (Mickey 18, Mary 16).

This also marked the final appearance of recurring player Donald Haines.

The Fishing scenes were filmed on Ballona Creek in Culver City.

The amusement park scenes were filmed at the Venice Amusement Pier and show the rides and attractions ca. 1933.

== See also ==
- Our Gang filmography
