= Birthday Blues =

1932 film

- Directed by: Robert F. McGowan
- Produced by: Robert F. McGowan; Hal Roach
- Starring: Dickie Moore; George McFarland; Matthew Beard; Dorothy DeBorba; Kendall McComas; Pete the Pup
- Cinematography: Art Lloyd
- Edited by: Richard C. Currier
- Music by: Leroy Shield; Marvin Hatley
- Distributed by: MGM
- Release date: November 12, 1932
- Running time: 19' 09"
- Country: United States
- Language: English

Birthday Blues is a 1932 Our Gang short comedy film directed by Robert F. McGowan. It was the 118th Our Gang short to be released.

== Plot ==
When their pennypinching father refuses to buy a birthday gift for their long-suffering mother, brothers Dickie and Spanky decide to purchase a gift for Mom on their own. Unfortunately, the "late 1922 model" dress they have selected is beyond their price range at $1.98 (equivalent to $44.04 in 2023); thus, acting upon the advice of Stymie, Dickie and Spanky decide to bake a cake with hidden prizes, then auction off the cake at ten cents a slice.

The party turns out to be a mess and Spanky's and Dickie's father returns to find it. He throws the gang and other kids out of the house and then gives Dickie a severe spanking. When Dad finds out that Dickie is using the money to buy Mom a dress, he abruptly changes his attitude. However, Dad feels the dress that Dickie bought is too fancy for Mom to wear to church on Sunday morning, but Mom proudly wears the one Dickie and Spanky picked out, to the crowd's amusement.

== Cast ==
=== The Gang ===
- Dickie Moore as Dickie
- Matthew Beard as Stymie
- Dorothy DeBorba as Dorothy
- Kendall McComas as Breezy Brisbane
- George McFarland as Spanky
- Bobbie Beard as Cotton
- Jackie Lyn Dufton as Jacquie
- Pete the Pup as himself

=== Additional cast ===
- Carlena Beard as Party guest with fake snake
- Georgie Billings as Party guest with powder in mouth
- Edith Fellows as Party guest with string in mouth
- Douglas Greer as Party guest squirted by liquid
- Donald Haines as Tough party guest
- Dickie Jackson as Party guest with bubbles in mouth
- Mildred Kornman as Party guest
- Marcia Mae Jones as Party guest with whistle
- Bobby Mallon as Party guest with liquid in mouth
- Hooper Atchley as John, the father
- Harry Bernard as Store proprietor
- Gordon Douglas as Delivery boy
- Lillian Rich as Lillian, the mother

== Notes ==
The film was edited by about 5 minutes from the Little Rascals syndicated television package in 1971 due to perceived racism toward African Americans. The episode was fully reinstated on AMC from 2001 to 2003.

== See also ==
- Our Gang filmography
