= Love Business =

1931 film

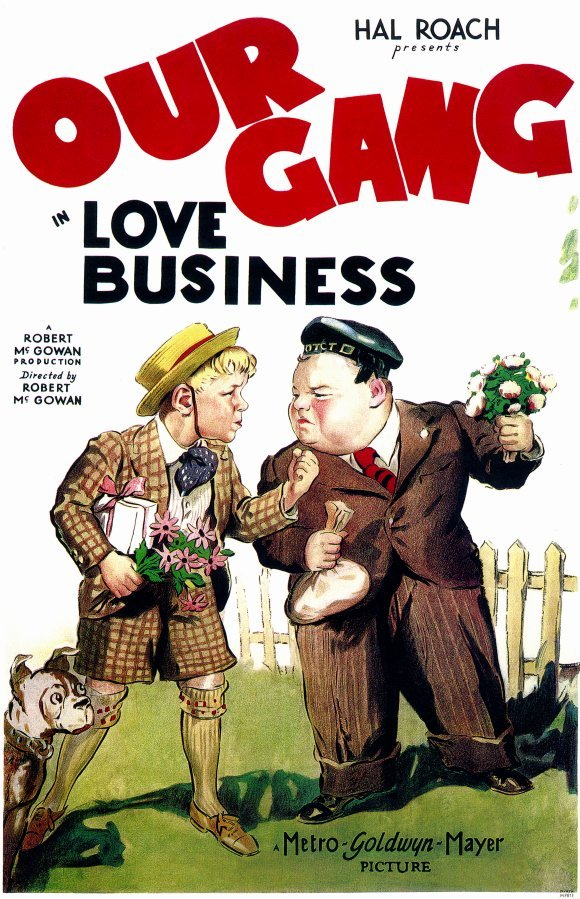
- Film poster
- Directed by: Robert F. McGowan
- Written by: H. M. Walker
- Produced by: Robert F. McGowan; Hal Roach
- Cinematography: Art Lloyd
- Edited by: Richard C. Currier
- Music by: Leroy Shield; Marvin Hatley
- Distributed by: MGM
- Release date: February 14, 1931
- Running time: 20:12
- Country: United States
- Language: English

Love Business is a 1931 Our Gang short comedy film directed by Robert F. McGowan. It was the 104th Our Gang short to be released.

== Plot ==
Love Business (1931)

Jackie is hopelessly in love with Miss Crabtree, his teacher. At the same time, his sister Mary Ann tells their mother that Jackie is in love with Miss Crabtree. Jackie runs off to school without eating breakfast. Meanwhile, Miss Crabtree becomes a boarder in Jackie's home and moves in later that day. Chubby is also in love with Miss Crabtree, and practices reciting poetry as Dorothy echos him in parody. At school, Wheezer tells Jackie, Mary Ann, Chubby, Farina, Donald and Bonedust that Miss Crabtree is moving into their house. Jackie has mixed emotions about this.

That evening, Miss Crabtree has dinner with Jackie, Mary Ann, Wheezer and their mother. Mothballs fell into the soup a bit earlier, giving the soup a very bitter taste. Later, Chubby stops in to see Miss Crabtree, and recites some very romantic poetry. Miss Crabtree asks Chubby where he got all this stuff. He says from Wheezer (who got them from his mother's old love letters). Mother hears this and is about to give Wheezer a spanking, but decides not to in the end, at the sight of him sleeping with Pete.

== Note ==
Most of the schoolyard scenes were edited from The Little Rascals television prints in 1971 due to stereotyping of African-Americans, but were reinstated in the 1990s home video market.

== Cast ==
=== The Gang ===
- Jackie Cooper as Jackie Cooper
- Norman Chaney as Norman 'Chubby'
- Matthew Beard as Stymie
- Dorothy DeBorba as Dorothy 'Echo'
- Allen Hoskins as Farina
- Bobby Hutchins as Wheezer Cooper
- Mary Ann Jackson as Mary Ann Cooper
- Shirley Jean Rickert as Shirley
- Donald Haines as Donald
- Bobby Young as Bonedust
- Pete the Pup as himself

=== Additional cast ===
- June Marlowe as Miss June Crabtree
- May Wallace as May Wallace Cooper, Jackie's mother
- Betty Mae And Beverly Crane as Title Speakers
- Baldwin Cooke as Undetermined role

== See also ==
- Our Gang filmography
