= Fly My Kite =

1931 film

- Directed by: Robert F. McGowan
- Written by: H. M. Walker
- Produced by: Robert F. McGowan; Hal Roach
- Starring: Our Gang; Margaret Mann; Jim Mason
- Cinematography: Art Lloyd
- Edited by: Richard C. Currier
- Music by: Leroy Shield; Marvin Hatley
- Distributed by: Metro-Goldwyn-Mayer
- Release date: May 30, 1931
- Running time: 20:51
- Country: United States
- Language: English

Fly My Kite is a 1931 Our Gang short comedy film directed by Robert F. McGowan. It was the 107th Our Gang short to be released.

== Plot ==
Grandma, who recently sold her grocery store, is enjoying retirement with her beloved "grandchildren". She's actually a widow who outlived her only daughter, who was married but childless. Grandma lives in her son-in-law's house, and he's in charge of her money, which he has mostly spent. Meanwhile, she is having fun with the Gang (including playing boxing) — she's not any one child's grandma but everyone's grandma. Her son-in-law, however, wants to remarry, and he and his intended both want Grandma out of the house so they can move in.

He tells her to get her stuff and get out. He also tells her that she is broke and that he used up all the money from the store sale mere months ago. He says that she is old and that he cannot wait till she dies of old age because that could take forever. He even says he's arranged to have her sent to the Poor Farm.

Grandma confronts her son-in-law by calling him a thief from the fact that he stole her money and even attacking him first before the Gang attacks him up on the spot (Mary accidentally hits Wheezer & Stymie dumps dirt from a bag to on the floor). He manages to escape the children's rampages and then tells Grandma to leave immediately. He finds a letter informing her that she has savings bonds and to communicate with the bank right away. He goes to the bank and discovers they are indeed worth $100,000 (by today's standards, about $5 million). As Grandma is packing, she finds the bonds that she still thinks have no worth. Chubby is flying a kite with Dickie, and the kite does not stay up. Grandma tells him the tail needs more weight and uses the bonds to get the kite to fly.

Grandma's son-in-law returns to the house, purposely breaks her glasses (she thinks it is accidental) and pretends to read a letter that her bonds are worthless. She tells him that the bonds are on the tail of Chubby's kite. He runs outside and tries to take the kite away from Chubby, who begins attacking him while the son-in-law could try to get the bonds from the kite. Grandma then reads the letter (magnified through a goldfish bowl) and learns the truth while Chubby continues to attack the son-in-law from getting the bonds. From there Grandma herself sends the Gang out to help Chubby keep her son-in-law from getting the kite; while she goes to find the gang herself. In the scuffle Dan lets go of the kite string and it gets picked up by Pete who, thinking they're playing, runs away from them with it. The Gang runs out and beats Grandma's son-in-law to a pulp (Including dragging him over a board studded with nails). They bust his watch (tit-for-tat for him breaking Grandma's glasses). After breaking free he chases Pete trying to get the kite away but in the chase the string breaks, blowing the kite away. Everyone gives chase but due to Dan being an adult he is able to outrun everyone and finds it first, leading him trapped onto a power pole.

Climbing up the pole Dan is about to get the kite. Sending the smaller kids to find some saws, Farina leads the kids into attacking him from below with rocks, mud and sending electric shocks via a power control to stop him, while Stymie throws rocks up high and practices to protect himself with getting hit by the rock himself. Using saws, the kids manage to cut through the pole and as Grandma gets close to the kids, they, after a three second countdown, together push the pole over causing Dan to crash to the ground in a pool of water. Grandma arrives with the police to find the kids have Dan trapped prior to his arrest with Mary Ann having retrieved the bonds saving Grandmas retirement. Meanwhile, Farina has Stymie underwater the pool after going underwater together prior to Dan's arrest.

== Cast ==
=== The Gang ===
- Matthew Beard as Stymie
- Norman Chaney as Chubby
- Dorothy DeBorba as Dorothy
- Allen Hoskins as Farina
- Bobby Hutchins as Wheezer
- Mary Ann Jackson as Mary Ann
- Shirley Jean Rickert as Shirley
- George Ernest as Georgie
- Dickie Jackson as Dickie
- Charles "Chic" Sales Jr. as Our Gang member
- Jackie Williams as Our Gang member
- Pete the Pup as himself

=== Additional cast ===
- Mae Busch as Dan's new wife
- Margaret Mann as Margaret 'Grandma' Mann
- Jim Mason as Dan, the son-in-law
- Broderick O'Farrell as Bond agent

== See also ==
- Our Gang filmography
