= Free Wheeling =

1932 Our Gang short film

- Film poster
- Directed by: Robert F. McGowan
- Written by: Hal Roach; H. M. Walker
- Produced by: Robert F. McGowan; Hal Roach
- Cinematography: Art Lloyd
- Edited by: Richard C. Currier
- Music by: Leroy Shield; Marvin Hatley
- Distributed by: Metro-Goldwyn-Mayer
- Release date: October 1, 1932
- Running time: 19' 34"
- Country: United States
- Language: English

Free Wheeling is a 1932 Our Gang short comedy film directed by Robert F. McGowan. It was the 117th Our Gang short to be released.

== Plot ==
Confined to a neck brace, poor little rich boy Dickie would like to play with the neighborhood kids, but his overprotective mother will not let him. On the sly, however, Dickie sneaks out of his bedroom in search of adventure in the company of his best pal, Stymie. Purchasing a ride on the donkey-driven "taxicab" piloted by Breezy Brisbane, the boys, along with hitchhikers Spanky and Jacquie Lyn, experience enough thrills and excitement to last a lifetime when the taxi begins rolling down a steep hill minus brakes.

== Cast ==
=== The Gang ===
- Dickie Moore as Dickie
- Matthew Beard as Stymie
- Dorothy DeBorba as Dorothy
- Kendall McComas as Breezy Brisbane
- George McFarland as Spanky
- Jacquie Lyn as Jacquie
- Douglas Greer as Douglas

=== Additional cast ===
- Bobby Mallon as Kid who gets paddled by the gang
- Johnnie Mae Beard as Stymie's mother
- Estelle Etterre as Dickie's nurse
- Lillian Rich as Dickie's mother
- Creighton Hale as Creighton, Dickie's father
- Harry Bernard as a roadside worker
- Dick Gilbert as a roadside worker
- Theresa Harris as Maid
- Jack Hill as Officer sent skyward
- Wilfred Lucas as the doctor
- Anthony Mack as the man who gets socked while asleep by lamppost

== Note ==
Free Wheeling was edited by a few minutes on the syndicated Little Rascals television packages in 1971 due to its racism toward African Americans. The film was restored on AMC airing from 2001 to 2003. The "free wheeling" downhill scenes involving the runaway car were filmed on Outpost Drive in Hollywood, California.

== See also ==
- Our Gang filmography
