= Hide and Shriek =

1938 film

- Film poster
- Directed by: Gordon Douglas
- Produced by: Hal Roach
- Cinematography: Norbert Brodine
- Edited by: William H. Ziegler
- Music by: Leroy Shield
- Distributed by: MGM
- Release date: June 18, 1938
- Running time: 10 minutes
- Country: United States
- Language: English

Hide and Shriek is a 1938 Our Gang short film directed by Gordon Douglas. It was the 168th Our Gang entry in the series, and the last to involve series creator Hal Roach.

The film is a comedy mystery, about a private detective investigating a case about stolen candy. The detective and his two assistants follow two suspects into an amusement park. The trio are trapped in haunted house attraction, and are scared by the fake ghosts and monsters of the attraction.

== Plot ==
Opening his own detective agency, Alfalfa dons a deerstalker cap and rechristens himself "X-10, Sooper Sleuth." His first assignment: to find out who stole a box of candy from Darla. Suspecting that Leonard and Junior are the alleged culprits, Alfalfa and his chief (and only) operatives Buckwheat and Porky put a tail on the two youngsters. Unfortunately, the three junior gumshoes are sidetracked to a seaside amusement pier, where they find themselves trapped in a haunted house attraction.

Darla eventually discovers her candy was right where she left it—in her doll carriage. But it is too late: scared out of their wits by various ersatz ghosts, monsters and spooky moans and groans, the trio vow to give up the detective business forever (as Alfalfa's "Out of Bizzness" sign on the door notes).

== Cast ==
=== The Gang ===
- Darla Hood as Darla
- Eugene Lee as Porky, alias X-6
- Carl Switzer as Alfalfa, alias X-10
- Billie Thomas as Buckwheat, alias X-6½

=== Additional cast ===
- Gary Jasgur as Gary
- Leonard Landy as Percy
- Billy Bletcher as Voices of haunted house ghouls (voice)
- Fred Holmes as Janitor

== Notes ==
Hide and Shriek was the final entry in producer Hal Roach's Our Gang series and the last short film released overall by the studio. Roach was contracted to produce one more year's worth of Our Gang shorts for MGM, but his distribution deal with other properties expired earlier that year. Roach switched to another studio, United Artists, to distribute his feature films. Our Gang was his only remaining short subject series. As a result, MGM opted to purchase the unit outright, as Our Gang was still popular and MGM wanted to keep the series in production.

Upon arrival at MGM, Our Gang would continue in production until 1944. The MGM entires are considered by several critics, and the Our Gang actors themselves, as lesser entries compared to the Roach shorts.

== See also ==
- Our Gang filmography
