= The First Seven Years =

1930 film

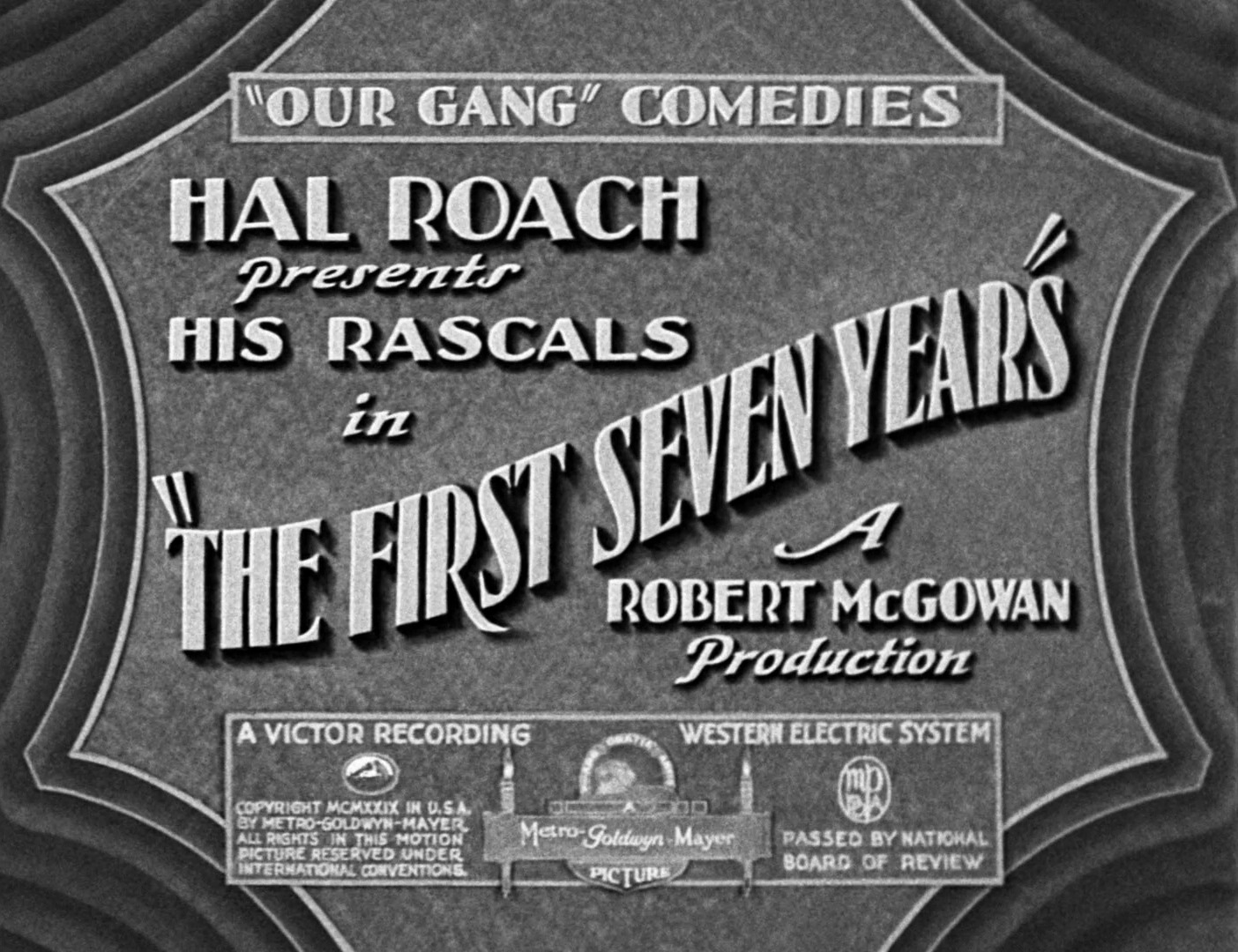
- Title card
- Directed by: Robert F. McGowan
- Written by: Anthony Mack
- Produced by: Robert F. McGowan; Hal Roach
- Starring: Jackie Cooper; Mary Ann Jackson; Donald Haines; Bobby Hutchins; Allen Hoskins; Norman Chaney; Pete the Pup
- Cinematography: Art Lloyd
- Edited by: Richard C. Currier
- Music by: Ray Henderson
- Production company: Hal Roach Studios
- Distributed by: Metro-Goldwyn-Mayer
- Release date: March 1, 1930
- Running time: 19:57
- Country: United States
- Language: English

The First Seven Years is a 1930 Our Gang short comedy film, the 96th in the series, directed by Robert F. McGowan.

== Plot ==
The First Seven Years (1930)

Jackie and Speck are both in love with Mary Ann, but she is not interested in any boys. However, after battering Jackie, she suggests that Jackie and Speck fight in a duel for her affection. Jackie and Speck fight with real swords that have been used to damage a tire and shred clothing. They drop their swords and fight with their fists. Jackie wins, but Speck's father holds Jackie down while Speck strikes Jackie until Jackie's elderly grandmother intervenes and knocks Speck's dad down, with the gang cheering.

== Cast ==
=== The Gang ===
- Jackie Cooper as Jackie
- Norman Chaney as Chubby
- Allen Hoskins as Farina
- Bobby Hutchins as Wheezer
- Mary Ann Jackson as Mary Ann
- Donald Haines as Speck
- Pete the Pup as Himself

=== Additional cast ===
- Otto Fries as Speck's father
- Edgar Kennedy as Kennedy the Cop
- Emma Reed as Farina's mother
- Joy Winthrop as Granny

== See also ==
- Our Gang filmography
