= Douglas Greer =

American actor (1921–2016)

- Born: Charles Douglas Greer; May 21, 1921; Ottawa, Ontario, Canada
- Died: January 6, 2016 (aged 94); Santa Cruz, California
- Occupations: Actor, magician, businessman
- Years active: 1929–1934
- Spouse: Doris Greer
- Children: 1

Charles Douglas "Turkey Egg" Greer (May 21, 1921 - January 6, 2016) was an American child actor.

== Film career ==
Born in Canada, Greer moved with his family to Glendale, California, in 1924. He began working in the movies at age seven after winning a freckle contest. Between 1930 and 1932, Greer was a semi-regular actor in Our Gang, often appearing in roles as a tough kid. His freckles earned him the name "Turkey Egg" from Our Gang director Robert F. McGowan. Greer also played small roles in a number of feature films apart from Our Gang. Greer retired from the movie business in 1934, at age 13.

== Later life ==
After he retired from the movie business in 1934, Greer founded a successful laboratory furniture and supply company. During World War II, he was one of the first members of the 10th Mountain Division Ski Troops at Camp Hale, Colorado. After finishing training, he was transferred to inactive duty to work at Lockheed for a specific job just before his outfit was to head overseas to the Italian Alps. He later discovered that every officer in his company had been either killed or wounded in the first three days of battle. He was honorably discharged on March 31, 1946.

Greer was also a magician and member of the Magic Castle Club. In his later years, Greer was also interviewed in some documentaries about Our Gang.

== Personal life ==
Greer was preceded in death by his wife, Doris Greer (died 1990), their only child, daughter, Mrs. Diane Welton, and a grandson, Wesley McCall. At the time of his death at age 94, Greer was survived by three grandchildren and two great-grandchildren.

== Filmography ==
- Song of Love (1929)
- Sunny Side Up (1929)
- Shivering Shakespeare (1930)
- The Arizona Kid (1930)
- School's Out (1930)
- Little Daddy (1931)
- Bargain Day (1931)
- Spanky (1932)
- When a Fellow Needs a Friend (1932)
- Free Wheeling (1932)
- Birthday Blues (1932)
- No Greater Glory (1934)
- The Mighty Barnum (1934)
