= Sherwood Bailey =

American child actor (1923–1987)

- Sherwood Bailey, 1939
- Born: August 6, 1923; Long Beach, California, U.S.
- Died: August 6, 1987 (aged 64); Newport Beach, California, U.S.
- Other name: Spud
- Occupations: Child actor, civil engineer
- Years active: 1928–1956

Sherwood Bailey (August 6, 1923 – August 6, 1987) was an American child actor and civil engineer. His parents were nonprofessionals. He is most noted for appearing as Spud, the red-headed, freckle-faced bad boy and enemy of the gang in the Our Gang short subjects series from 1931 to 1932. Spud was characterized as the mama's-boy type who got away with everything and who also liked the girls a lot.

Bailey's most notable appearance was that of the spoiled, bratty stepbrother of Wheezer and Dorothy in 1931's Dogs Is Dogs. In that short, he is nearly convinced by Stymie that ham and eggs can talk and is later pushed down a well by his own dog, Nero. Bailey left the Our Gang series in 1932 at the age of nine.

Bailey quietly left the film industry in 1956. Before retiring from his professional acting career in 1956, Bailey appeared in a few movies, including The Big Stampede (1932) with John Wayne, Too Many Parents (1936), and Young Tom Edison (1940) with Mickey Rooney.

He graduated from Polytechnic High School in Long Beach, then studied engineering at UCLA but did not graduate. He later earned his state civil engineering license and worked as a civil engineer in Huntington Beach.

== Death ==
He died of cancer on his 64th birthday.
