= Dorothy DeBorba =

American child actress (1925–2010)

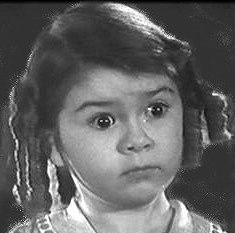
- Dorothy DeBorba, pictured in the 1931 Our Gang film Bargain Day
- Born: Dorothy Adelle DeBorba; March 28, 1925; Los Angeles, California, U.S.
- Died: June 2, 2010 (aged 85); Walnut Creek, California, U.S.
- Other name: Dorothy DeBorba Habereitter
- Occupation: Child actress
- Years active: 1930–1960
- Children: 2

Dorothy Adele DeBorba (March 28, 1925 – June 2, 2010) was an American child actress who was a regular in the Our Gang series of short subjects as the leading lady from 1930 to 1933.

== Early life ==
Dorothy Adelle DeBorba was raised in Livermore, California. Of Portuguese Azorean ancestry, she came from a show business background. Her mother was a singer-dancer-actress, and her father was a drummer in Paul Whiteman's band.

== Our Gang ==
Dorothy DeBorba began her career at age five. She impressed Hal Roach with her ability to cry on cue. Her debut was an auspicious one: in Pups Is Pups (1930), she plays Jackie Cooper's younger sister.

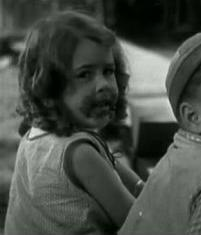
Dorothy DeBorba, age 5, in the Our Gang short film School's Out

With her trademark curls and elaborate hair bows, Dorothy quickly became an audience favorite. Her mother made those bows and would spend two hours every night brushing and putting Dorothy's hair up in curlers. Her natural energy and mischievousness added to her appeal. Although she stated that "the boys [in the series] were given all the best lines," in Love Business Dorothy has some of the funniest lines in the entire series, delivered while Chubby is practicing his seductive patter on an oversized cutout poster of Greta Garbo in front of a movie house:

Chubby: Darling, can you hear the pleas in my whispers?
Dorothy: Darling, can you hear the fleas in my whiskers?

Chubby: If love is like a rose, I will pick my rose in the bud.
Dorothy: If love is like a rose, I will stick my nose in the mud.

Chubby: My heart is filled with joy. I want to trip and dance.
Dorothy: My heart is filled with joy. I want to rip my pants.

This "smart-alecky compulsion" earned her the nickname "Echo" at the Hal Roach Studios.

In 1931 Dorothy became the female star after Mary Ann Jackson left the series.

She appeared in twenty-four Our Gang comedies over three years with her last appearance coming in 1933's Mush and Milk. "It was like we had the biggest playhouse in the world," she said. "We were always playing when we weren't working or going to school. 'Uncle' Bob McGowan had a real terrific way with children." She stated, however, "It wasn't really much fun, working every day and going to school besides. By the age of ten, of course, the movie careers of most of us were finished."

== Later life ==
DeBorba graduated from Van Nuys High School and then worked at Republic Pictures as a secretary. In later years she was a senior clerk in the School of Journalism at UC-Berkeley. She married twice and had two children.

== Death ==
DeBorba died in 2010 of emphysema at the age of 85 in Walnut Creek, California.

== Filmography ==
- Pups Is Pups (1930)
- A Royal Romance (1930)
- Teacher's Pet (1930)
- School's Out (1930)
- Helping Grandma (1930)
- Love Business (1931)
- Little Daddy (1931)
- Bargain Day (1931)
- Fly My Kite (1931)
- The Stolen Jools (1931)
- Big Ears (1931)
- Shiver My Timbers (1931)
- Dogs Is Dogs (1931)
- Readin' and Writin' (1932)
- Free Eats (1932)
- Spanky (1932)
- Choo-Choo! (1932)
- The Pooch (1932)
- Hook and Ladder (1932)
- Free Wheeling (1932)
- Birthday Blues (1932)
- A Lad an' a Lamp (1932)
- Fish Hooky (1933)
- Forgotten Babies (1933)
- The Kid from Borneo (1933)
- Mush and Milk (1933)
