= Our Gang =

American series of comedy short films

- Title card for the 1937 Our Gang comedy short Rushin' Ballet
- Created by: Hal Roach
- Original work: Our Gang (1922)
- Owners: Legend Films (copyrights and theatrical rights to 1931–1938 shorts, since 2024 under co-distribution with Multicom Entertainment Group); Skydance Corporation (through CBS Studios) (Little Rascals trademark; broadcast and cable television rights 1931–1938 shorts) and (through Turner Entertainment Co.) (Our Gang trademark; 1938–1944 shorts and General Spanky)

Print publications
- Book: A Story of Our Gang: Romping Through the Hal Roach Comedies (1929)
- Comics: Our Gang Comics (Dell Comics, 1942–1949, 59 issues); Four Color Comics (Dell Comics, 1956–1962, 12 issues of anthology series)

Films and television
- Films: General Spanky (1936); The Little Rascals (1994)
- Short films: Our Gang Comedies: 220 shorts produced by Hal Roach Studios (1922–1938); Metro-Goldwyn-Mayer (1938–1944)
- Animated series: The Little Rascals
- Television special: The Little Rascals Christmas Special (1979)
- Direct-to-video: The Little Rascals Save the Day (2014)

Miscellaneous
- Series directors: Robert F. McGowan; Gus Meins; Gordon Douglas; Edward L. Cahn; George Sidney; Cy Endfield; Ray McCarey; James W. Horne; Robert A. McGowan; Fred C. Newmeyer; Nate Watt; Sam Baerwitz; Herbert Glazer
- Series producers: Hal Roach; Robert F. McGowan; Jack Chertok
- Series screenwriters: Frank Capra; Charley Chase; Walter Lantz; Hal Law; Leo McCarey; Robert A. McGowan; Robert F. McGowan; Hal Roach; Frank Tashlin; H. M. Walker
- Series musical directors: Marvin Hatley; Leroy Shield
- Series cinematographers: Norbert Brodine; Milton Krasner; Art Lloyd; Kenneth Peach; Robert Pittack; Harold Marzorati; Jackson Rose
- Series theatrical distributors: Pathé Exchange (1922–1928); Metro-Goldwyn-Mayer (1927–1944)
- First short: One Terrible Day (September 10, 1922)
- Final short: Dancing Romeo (April 29, 1944)

Our Gang (also known as The Little Rascals or Hal Roach's Rascals) is an American series of comedy short films chronicling the adventures of a group of mischievous children in a working class neighborhood of Los Angeles. Created by film producer Hal Roach, who also produced the Laurel and Hardy films, Our Gang shorts were produced from 1922 to 1944, spanning the silent film and early sound film periods of American cinema. Our Gang is noted for showing children behaving in a relatively natural way; Roach and original director Robert F. McGowan worked to film the unaffected, raw nuances apparent in regular children, rather than have them imitate adult acting styles. The series also broke new ground by portraying black and white children interacting as equals during the Jim Crow era of racial segregation in the United States.

The franchise began in 1922 as a silent short subject series produced by the Roach studio and released by Pathé Exchange. Roach changed distributors from Pathé to Metro-Goldwyn-Mayer (MGM) in 1927, and the series entered its most popular period after converting to sound in 1929. Production continued at Roach until 1938, when the Our Gang production unit was sold to MGM, where production continued until 1944. Across 220 short films and a feature-film spin-off, General Spanky, the Our Gang series featured more than 41 child actors as regular members of its cast.

Because MGM retained the rights to the Our Gang trademark after buying the series, the Roach-produced Our Gang sound films were re-released to theaters and syndicated for television under the title The Little Rascals.

The Roach-produced Little Rascals shorts that remain under copyright (1931–1938) were owned by Chicken Soup for the Soul Entertainment (through its subsidiary Halcyon Studios) until its bankruptcy in 2024. The current owners of the copyrights are unconfirmed; however, Legend Films obtained colorization and distribution rights in 2006, and Multicom Entertainment Group, retains rights to restored titles from their Official Films masters as "Hal Roach's Famous Kids Comedies". ClassicFlix obtained home video distribution rights in 2020, and Shout! Studios acquired streaming rights in 2023. All entries produced between 1922 and 1930, inclusive, are in the public domain in the United States. Skydance Corporation reunites ownership of the television distribution rights to the 1931–1938 Roach-era shorts for broadcast and cable (through Paramount Skydance) and MGM's Our Gang series (1938–1944) (through Warner Bros. Discovery) for the first time since Hal Roach sold the films into television syndication in the 1950s.

New productions based on the shorts have been made over the years, including the 1994 feature film The Little Rascals, released by Universal Pictures.

== Series overview ==
Unlike many films featuring children and based in fantasy, producer/creator Hal Roach rooted Our Gang in real life: most of the children were poor, and the gang was often at odds with snobbish or rich children, officious adults, parents, and other such adversaries. Although the gang members tended to avoid school, chores, and medicines like castor oil whenever possible, they would enthusiastically throw their efforts into constructing elaborate, animal-driven contraptions, putting on athletic contests and spectacles of all kinds, and generally disrupting society events and adult activities.

=== Directorial approach ===
Robert F. McGowan directed most of the Our Gang shorts until 1933, assisted by his nephew Anthony Mack. McGowan worked to develop a style that allowed the children to be as natural as possible, downplaying the importance of the filmmaking equipment. Scripts were written by the Hal Roach comedy-writing staff, which included at various times Leo McCarey, Frank Capra, Walter Lantz, and Frank Tashlin. The children, some too young to read, rarely saw the scripts; instead, McGowan would explain scenes to each child immediately before they were shot, directing the children using a megaphone and encouraging improvisation.

With the introduction of sound films in the late 1920s, McGowan slightly modified his approach, but scripts were not closely followed until he left the series. Later Our Gang directors, such as Gus Meins and Gordon Douglas, streamlined the approach to McGowan's methods to meet the demands of the increasingly sophisticated film industry of the mid-to-late 1930s. Douglas was forced to streamline his approach after Roach halved the running times of the shorts from two reels (20 minutes) to one reel (10 minutes).

=== Finding and replacing the cast ===
As children aged out of their roles, they were replaced by new children, usually from the Los Angeles area. Eventually Our Gang talent scouting employed large-scale national contests in which thousands of children auditioned for open roles. Norman Chaney ("Chubby"), Matthew Beard ("Stymie"), and Billie "Buckwheat" Thomas all won contests to become members of the cast: Chaney replaced Joe Cobb, Beard replaced Allen Hoskins ("Farina"), and Thomas replaced Beard.

The studio was continuously bombarded by requests from parents suggesting their children for roles in the films. These children included future child stars Mickey Rooney and Shirley Temple, neither of whom advanced past the audition stage.

=== African-American and other minority cast members ===
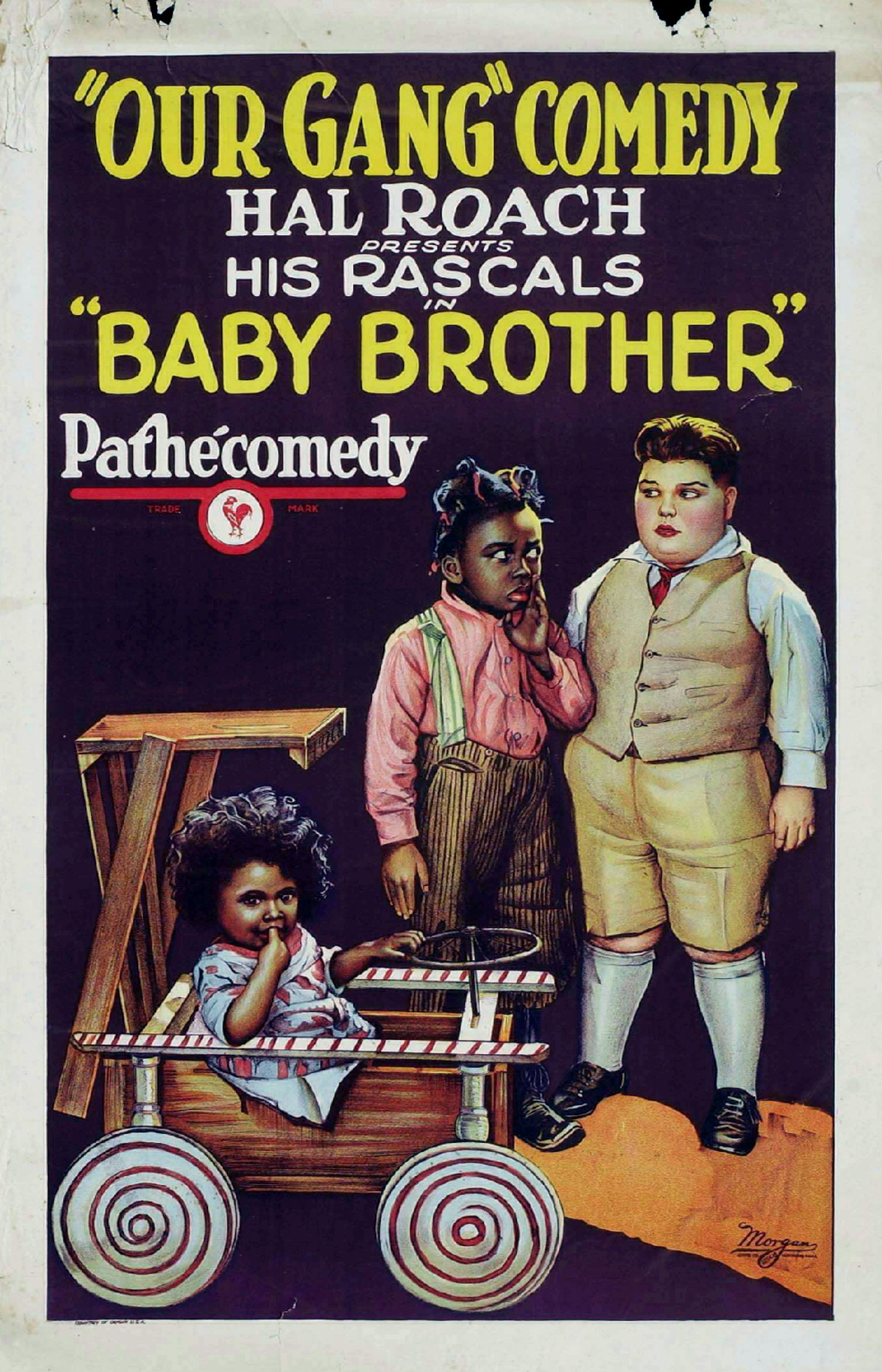
The theatrical poster for the 1927 Our Gang comedy Baby Brother, in which Allen "Farina" Hoskins (center) paints a black baby with white shoe polish so that he can sell him to a lonely rich boy, Joe Cobb (right), as a baby brother

The Our Gang series, produced during the Jim Crow era, is one of the first in cinema history in which African Americans and White Americans were portrayed as equals. The five black child actors who held main roles in the series were Ernie Morrison, Eugene Jackson, Allen Hoskins, Matthew Beard and Billie Thomas. Morrison was the first black actor signed to a long-term contract in Hollywood history and the first major black star in Hollywood history.

The African-American characters have often been criticized as racial stereotypes. The black children spoke (or were indicated as speaking via text titles in the case of the silent entries) in a stereotypical "Negro dialect", and several controversial gags revolved directly around their skin color, such as Stymie sweating jet-black ink and Buckwheat contracting fake "white measles" and supposedly transforming into a monkey. In the 1924 short Lodge Night, the kids form a parody club based on the Ku Klux Klan (although the black children are allowed to join).

In their adult years, actors Morrison, Beard, and Thomas defended the series, arguing that the white characters were similarly stereotyped: the "freckle-faced kid", the "fat kid", the "neighborhood bully", the "pretty blond girl", and the "mischievous toddler". In an interview on Tom Snyder's The Tomorrow Show in 1974, Beard said of his time in the series that "I feel it was great. Some of the lines I had to say I didn't like, but I never look at it like that. I just try to look at it as mostly a fun thing. We were just a group of kids who were having fun." In a separate interview, Morrison stated, "When it came to race, Hal Roach was color-blind."

Our Gang's integrated cast drew the disdain of some theater owners in the South. Early in film series, these owners complained to Pathé that Morrison and Hoskins were featured with too much screen time and that their prominence in the shorts would offend white audiences. The Our Gang spinoff film Curley (1947) was banned by the Memphis, Tennessee censor board for showing black and white children in school together, a characteristic common to even the earlier shorts. Other minorities, including Asian Americans Sing Joy, Allen Tong (also known as Alan Dong), and Edward Soo Hoo, as well as Italian-American actor Mickey Gubitosi (later known as Robert Blake), were depicted in the series with varying levels of stereotyping.

== History ==
Left to right: Ernie "Sunshine Sammy" Morrison, Andy Samuel, Allen "Farina" Hoskins, Mickey Daniels and Joe Cobb in a 1923 still from one of the earliest Our Gang comedies

=== 1922–1925: Early years ===
According to Roach, he devised the idea for Our Gang in 1921 after auditioning a child actress whom he believed to be overly rehearsed and wearing excessive makeup. Through his window, Roach saw some children arguing over sticks of wood in a lumberyard and thought that a series of film shorts about children being themselves might be a success.

Our Gang also had its roots in a canceled Roach short-subject series revolving around the adventures of a black boy called "Sunshine Sammy", played by Ernie Morrison. As some theater owners had been wary of booking shorts focused on a black boy, the series ended after just one entry, The Pickaninny (1921), was produced. The character became a focus of the new Our Gang series.

Under the supervision of Charley Chase, work began on the first two-reel shorts in the new "kids-and-pets" series, to be called Hal Roach's Rascals, later that year. Fred C. Newmeyer directed the first pilot film, entitled Our Gang, but Roach scrapped Newmeyer's work and commissioned former fireman Robert F. McGowan to reshoot the film. Roach tested it at several theaters around Hollywood to receptive audiences, and some in the press expressed a desire for additional films. The colloquial usage of the term Our Gang caused it to become the series' second official title, with the title cards reading "Our Gang Comedies: Hal Roach presents His Rascals in..." The series was officially called both Our Gang and Hal Roach's Rascals until 1932, when Our Gang became the sole title of the series.

The first cast was recruited primarily of children recommended to Roach by studio employees, with the exception of Morrison, who was already under contract to Roach. The others included Roach photographer Gene Kornman's daughter Mary Kornman, their friends' son Mickey Daniels, and family friends Allen Hoskins, Jack Davis, Jackie Condon, and Joe Cobb. Most early shorts were filmed outdoors and on location and featured a menagerie of animal characters, such as Dinah the Mule. Robert McGowan and Tom McNamara served in tandem as the series' directors during this early period.

Roach's distributor Pathé released One Terrible Day, the fourth short produced for the series, as the first short on September 10, 1922; the pilot film Our Gang was not released until November 5. The series performed well at the box office, and by the end of the decade, the Our Gang children were pictured in numerous product endorsements.

The featured Our Gang stars were Morrison as Sunshine Sammy, Daniels, Kornman, and Hoskins as little Farina, who eventually became the most popular member of the 1920s gang and the most popular black child star of the 1920s. A reviewer wrote of the Farina character, depicted as female although played by a male child, in Photoplay: "The honors go to a very young lady of color, billed as 'Little Farina.' Scarcely two years old, she goes through each set like a wee, sombre shadow." Daniels and Kornman were very popular and were often paired in Our Gang and a later teen version of the series titled The Boy Friends, which Roach produced from 1930 to 1932. Other early Our Gang children were Eugene Jackson as Pineapple, Scooter Lowry, Andy Samuel, Johnny Downs, Winston and Weston Doty, and Jay R. Smith.

=== 1926–1929: New faces and new distributors ===
After Ernie, Mickey and Mary left the series in the mid-1920s, the Our Gang series entered a transitional period. The stress of directing child actors forced McGowan to take doctor-mandated sabbaticals for exhaustion, leaving his nephew Robert A. McGowan (credited as Anthony Mack) to direct many shorts in this period. The Mack-directed shorts are considered by many as among the lesser entries in the series. New faces included Bobby Hutchins as Wheezer, Harry Spear, Jean Darling and Mary Ann Jackson, while Farina served as the series' anchor.

Also at this time, the Our Gang cast acquired an American Pit Bull Terrier with a ring around one eye, originally named Pansy but soon known as Pete the Pup, the most famous Our Gang pet. In 1927, Roach ended his distribution arrangement with the Pathé company. He agreed to release future products through the newly formed Metro-Goldwyn-Mayer, which released its first Our Gang comedy, Yale vs. Harvard, now a lost film, in September 1927. The move to MGM offered Roach larger budgets and the chance for his films to be packaged with MGM features for the Loews Theatres chain.

Some shorts around this time, particularly Spook Spoofing (1928), contained extended scenes of the gang tormenting and teasing Farina, scenes that raised claims of racism that many other shorts did not warrant. These shorts marked the departure of Jackie Condon, who had been with the group from the beginning of the series.

Jackie Cooper in the 1930 short School's Out

=== 1928–1931: Entering the sound era ===
Starting in 1928, Our Gang comedies were distributed with phonographic discs that contained synchronized music and sound-effect tracks. In the spring of 1929, the Roach studios were converted for sound recording, and Our Gang's sound debut occurred in April 1929 with the 25-minute film Small Talk. It took a year for McGowan and the cast to fully adjust to sound films, a period in which they lost Joe Cobb, Jean Darling and Harry Spear and added Norman Chaney, Dorothy DeBorba, Matthew "Stymie" Beard, Donald Haines and Jackie Cooper.

Cooper proved to be the personality whom the series had been missing since Daniels left and was featured prominently in three 1930/1931 Our Gang films: Teacher's Pet, School's Out, and Love Business. These three shorts explored Cooper's crush on new schoolteacher Miss Crabtree, played by June Marlowe. Cooper soon won the lead role in Paramount's feature film Skippy, and Roach sold Cooper's contract to MGM in 1931. Other Our Gang members appearing in the early sound shorts included Buddy McDonald, Clifton Young, and Shirley Jean Rickert. Many also appeared in a group cameo appearance in the all-star comedy short The Stolen Jools (1931).

Beginning with the short When the Wind Blows, in 1930 background music scores were added to the soundtracks of most of the Our Gang films. Initially, the music consisted of orchestral versions of popular tunes. Marvin Hatley had served as the music director of Hal Roach Studios since 1929, and RCA employee Leroy Shield joined the company as a part-time musical director in mid-1930. Hatley and Shield's jazz-influenced scores, first featured in Pups Is Pups in 1930, became recognizable trademarks of Our Gang, Laurel and Hardy, and other Roach films.

Another 1930 short, Teacher's Pet, marked the first use of the Our Gang theme song, "Good Old Days". Originally composed by Shield for use in Laurel and Hardy's first feature, Pardon Us, "Good Old Days," featuring a notable saxophone solo, served as the series' theme until 1938. Shield and Hatley's scores were included in the films regularly through 1934, when they became less frequent.

In 1930, Roach began production on The Boy Friends, a short-subject series that was essentially a teenage version of Our Gang. Featuring Our Gang alumni Daniels and Kornman among its cast, The Boy Friends was produced for two years, with 15 installments in total.

The gang races rich kid Jerry Tucker in their makeshift fire engine in the 1934 short Hi'-Neighbor!

=== 1931–1933: Transition ===
Cooper left Our Gang in early 1931 just before another wave of cast changes, as Farina Hoskins, Chubby Chaney, and Mary Ann Jackson all departed several months later. Our Gang entered another transitional period, similar to that of the mid-1920s. Matthew Beard, Wheezer Hutchins, and Dorothy DeBorba carried the series during this period, aided by Sherwood Bailey and Kendall McComas, who would play Breezy Brisbane. Unlike the mid-1920s period, McGowan sustained the quality of the series with the help of the several regular cast members and the Roach writing staff. Many of these shorts include early appearances of Jerry Tucker and Wally Albright, who later became series regulars.

New Roach discovery George McFarland joined the gang as Spanky late in 1931 at the age of three and remained an Our Gang actor for 11 years, except for a brief break in Summer 1938. At first appearing as the tag-along toddler of the group, and later finding an accomplice in Scotty Beckett in 1934, Spanky quickly became Our Gang's greatest child star. He won parts in a number of outside features, appeared in many Our Gang product endorsements and spinoff merchandise items, and popularized the expressions "Okey-dokey!" and "Okey-doke!"

Veteran child actor Dickie Moore joined in the middle of 1932 and remained with the series for one year. Other members in these years included Mary Ann Jackson's brother Dickie Jackson, John "Uh-huh" Collum, and Tommy Bond. Upon Moore's departure in mid 1933, long-term Our Gang members such as Wheezer (who had been with Our Gang since the late Pathé silents period) and Dorothy left the series as well.

=== 1933–1936: New directions ===
McGowan, exhausted from the stress of working with the child actors, had as early as 1931 tried to resign as producer/director of Our Gang. Lacking a replacement, Roach persuaded him to remain for another year. At the start of the 1933–34 season, the Our Gang series format was significantly altered to accommodate McGowan and persuade him to stay another year. The first two entries of the season in Fall 1933, Bedtime Worries and Wild Poses (which featured a cameo by Laurel and Hardy), focused on Spanky and his hapless parents, portrayed by Gay Seabrook and Emerson Treacy, in a family-oriented situation-comedy format similar to the style later popular on television. A smaller cast of Our Gang kids—Matthew Beard, Tommy Bond, Jerry Tucker, and Georgie Billings—were featured in supporting roles with reduced screen time.

Unsatisfied, McGowan abruptly departed after Wild Poses (1933). Our Gang entered a four-month hiatus, during which the series was revised to a format similar to its original style, and German-born Gus Meins was hired as the new director.

Hi-Neighbor!, released in March 1934, ended the hiatus and was the first series entry directed by Meins, a veteran of the formerly competing Buster Brown short-subject series. Gordon Douglas served as Meins's assistant director, and Fred Newmeyer alternated directorial duties with Meins for a handful of shorts. Meins's Our Gang shorts were less improvisational than were McGowan's and featured a heavier reliance on dialogue. McGowan returned two years later to direct his final Our Gang film Divot Diggers, released in 1936.

Retaining McFarland, Beard, Bond, and Tucker, the revised series added Scotty Beckett, Wally Albright, and Billie Thomas, who soon began playing the character of Stymie's sister "Buckwheat", although Thomas was male. Semiregular actors such as Jackie Lynn Taylor, Marianne Edwards, and Leonard Kibrick as the neighborhood bully, joined the series. Bond and Albright left in the middle of 1934; Taylor and Edwards would depart by 1935.

Early in 1935, new cast members Carl Switzer and his brother Harold joined Our Gang after impressing Roach with an impromptu musical performance at the studio commissary. While Harold would eventually be relegated to the role of a background player, Carl, nicknamed "Alfalfa", eventually replaced Beckett as Spanky's sidekick. Beard as Stymie left the cast soon after, and the Buckwheat character morphed subtly into a male. That same year, Darla Hood, Patsy May, and Eugene Lee as Porky joined the gang. Beckett departed for a career in features but returned in 1939 for two shorts, Cousin Wilbur and Dog Daze.

=== The final Roach years ===
Our Gang was very successful during the 1920s and the early 1930s. However, by 1934, many theater owners were increasingly dropping two-reel (20-minute) comedies such as Our Gang and the Laurel & Hardy series and running double-feature programs instead. The Laurel and Hardy series, formerly film shorts, became features exclusively in mid-1935. By 1936, Hal Roach began debating plans to discontinue Our Gang until Louis B. Mayer, head of Roach's distributor MGM, persuaded Roach to keep the popular series in production. Roach agreed, producing shorter, one-reel Our Gang comedies (10 minutes in length instead of 20). The first one-reel Our Gang short, Bored of Education (1936), marked the Our Gang directorial debut of former assistant director Gordon Douglas and won the Academy Award for Best Short Subject (One Reel) in 1937.

As part of the arrangement with MGM to continue Our Gang, Roach received clearance to produce an Our Gang feature film, General Spanky, hoping that he might move the series to features as was done with Laurel and Hardy. Directed by Gordon Douglas and Fred Newmeyer, General Spanky featured characters Spanky, Buckwheat, and Alfalfa in a sentimental, Shirley Temple-style story set during the American Civil War. The film focused more on the adult leads (Phillips Holmes and Rosina Lawrence) than the children and was a box-office disappointment. No further Our Gang features were produced.

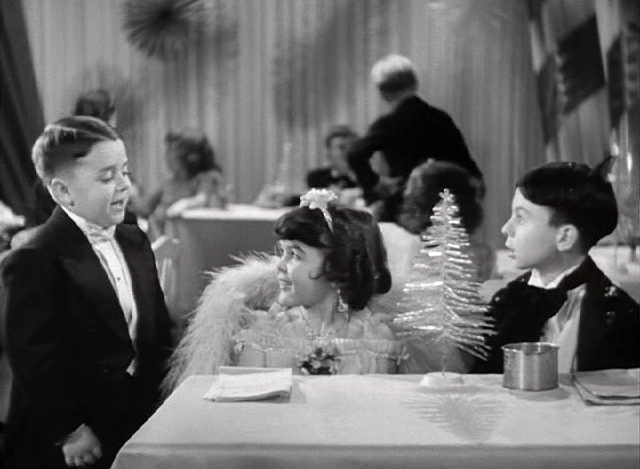
George McFarland, Darla Hood, and Carl "Alfalfa" Switzer in the "Club Spanky" dream sequence from the 1937 short Our Gang Follies of 1938.

After years of gradual cast changes, the troupe standardized in 1936 with the move to one-reel shorts. The 1936–1939 incarnation of the cast is perhaps the best-known of the series, featuring Spanky, Alfalfa, Darla, Buckwheat, and Porky, with recurring characters such as neighborhood bullies Butch and Woim and the bookworm Waldo. Bond, an intermittent member of the gang since 1932, returned as Butch beginning with the 1937 short Glove Taps. Sidney Kibrick, the younger brother of Leonard Kibrick, played Butch's crony Woim.

Glove Taps also featured the first appearance of Darwood Kaye as the bespectacled, foppish Waldo. In later shorts, both Butch and Waldo were portrayed as Alfalfa's rivals in his pursuit of Darla's affections. Other popular elements in these mid-to-late-1930s shorts include the "He-Man Woman Haters Club" from Hearts Are Thumps and Mail and Female (both 1937), the Laurel and Hardy-style interaction between Alfalfa and Spanky, and the comic tag-along team of Porky and Buckwheat.

Roach produced the final two-reel Our Gang short, a high-budget musical special entitled Our Gang Follies of 1938, in 1937 as a parody of MGM's Broadway Melody of 1938. Alfalfa, who aspires to be an opera singer, falls asleep and dreams that his old pal Spanky has become the rich owner of a swanky Broadway nightclub where Darla and Buckwheat perform, making "hundreds and thousands of dollars".

As the profit margins continued to decline because of double features, Roach found it increasingly difficult to afford to continue producing Our Gang. The lack of consistent success with Roach's concurrent program of feature output and an ultimately unsuccessful partnership with producer Vittorio Mussolini, son of Italian dictator Benito Mussolini, also caused disagreements with the management at MGM and with its parent company, Loews Inc.. As a result, Loews elected to end MGM's partnership with Roach. However, MGM did not want Our Gang discontinued and agreed to acquire the property from Roach and assume production.

On May 31, 1938, Roach sold the Our Gang unit to MGM, including the rights to the name and the contracts for the actors and writers, for $25,000 (equal to $571,809 today). After delivering the Laurel and Hardy feature Block-Heads in August 1938, Roach signed a new distribution deal with United Artists and left the short-subjects business. The final Roach-produced short in the Our Gang series, Hide and Shriek, was his final short-subject production, released by MGM on June 18, 1938.

=== The MGM era ===
The Little Ranger was the first Our Gang short to be produced at MGM. Gordon Douglas was loaned from Hal Roach Studios to direct The Little Ranger and another early MGM short, Aladdin's Lantern, while MGM assigned George Sidney, a young director from its own shorts department, as the permanent series director. Our Gang would be used by MGM as a training ground for future feature directors: Sidney, Edward Cahn and Cy Endfield all worked on Our Gang before advancing to feature films. Herbert Glazer remained a second-unit director outside of his work on the series.

Nearly all of the 52 MGM-produced Our Gang films were written by former Roach director Hal Law and former junior director Robert A. McGowan, nephew of former senior Our Gang director Robert F. McGowan, who was credited for these shorts as Robert McGowan (although he is also known as Anthony Mack), causing confusion for audiences and critics.

The last few Roach comedies and the first few MGM comedies featured Carl "Alfalfa" Switzer as the lead character, as George "Spanky" McFarland had departed from the series when his contract expired in March 1938. Casting his replacement was delayed until after the move to MGM, which opted to rehire McFarland to continue with the series.

In 1939, Mickey Gubitosi (later known by the stage name of Robert Blake) replaced Eugene "Porky" Lee, who had matured too quickly. Tommy Bond, Darwood Kaye, and Carl Switzer all left the series in 1940, and Billy "Froggy" Laughlin (with his Popeye-style trick voice) and Janet Burston were added to the cast. By the end of 1941, Darla Hood had departed from the series, and George McFarland followed her within a year. Billie Thomas remained in the cast as Buckwheat until the end of the series as the sole holdover from the Roach era.

The MGM Our Gang films were not received as favorably as were the Roach-produced shorts, largely because of MGM's inexperience with Our Gang's style of slapstick comedy and its insistence on retaining Alfalfa, Spanky, and Buckwheat in the series as they became teenagers. The MGM entries are thus considered by many film historians, and the Our Gang children themselves, as lesser films than the Roach entries. The children's performances were criticized as stilted and stiff, their dialogue recited instead of spoken naturally. Adult situations often drove the action, with each film often incorporating a moral, a civics lesson, or, as the United States prepared for and then entered World War II, a patriotic theme. The series was given a new setting in the fictitious town of Greenpoint rather than the gritty Los Angeles neighborhoods where the Hal Roach productions had been filmed and set. The mayhem caused by the kids was significantly muted.

Exhibitors noticed the drop in quality and often complained that the series was slipping. When six of the 13 shorts released between 1942 and 1943 sustained losses rather than turning profits, MGM discontinued Our Gang. The final three Our Gang shorts were all directed by Cy Endfield in late 1943 and released the following spring. Tale of a Dog was released as part of the MGM Miniatures series on April 15, 1944. The other two shorts, released to close out the regular Our Gang series, were Radio Bugs, released on April 1, 1944, and the final Our Gang comedy, Dancing Romeo, released on April 29, 1944.

Since 1937, Our Gang had been featured as a licensed comic strip in the British comic The Dandy, illustrated by Dudley D. Watkins. Starting in 1942, MGM licensed Our Gang to American publisher Dell Comics for the publication of Our Gang Comics, featuring the gang alongside MGM cartoon characters such as Barney Bear and Tom and Jerry. The strips in The Dandy ended three years after the demise of the Our Gang shorts in 1947. Our Gang Comics outlasted the series by five years, changing its name to Tom and Jerry Comics in 1949. In 2006, Fantagraphics Books issued a series of volumes reprinting the Our Gang stories, most of them written and drawn by Pogo creator Walt Kelly.

== Later years and The Little Rascals revival ==
=== The Little Rascals television package ===
When Roach sold Our Gang to MGM, he retained the option to buy the rights to the Our Gang trademark, provided that he produced no more children's comedies in the Our Gang vein. In the late 1940s, he created a new film property in the Our Gang mold and forfeited his right to buy the name Our Gang in order to obtain permission to produce two Cinecolor featurettes, Curley and Who Killed Doc Robbin. Neither film was critically or financially successful, and Roach turned to rereleasing the original Our Gang comedies.

In 1949, MGM sold the back catalog of 1927–1938 Our Gang silent and talking shorts to Roach while retaining the rights to the Our Gang name, the 52 Our Gang films that it produced, and the feature General Spanky. Under the terms of the sale, Roach was required to remove the Leo the Lion studio logo and all instances of the names or logos "Metro-Goldwyn-Mayer", "Loew's Incorporated", and "Our Gang" from the reissued film prints. Using a modified version of the series' original name, Roach repackaged 79 of the 80 sound Our Gang shorts as The Little Rascals. Monogram Pictures and its successor, Allied Artists, reissued the films to theaters beginning in 1950. Allied Artists' television department, Interstate Television, syndicated the films to television in 1954.

Under its new name, The Little Rascals enjoyed renewed popularity on television, and new Little Rascals comic books, toys, and other licensed merchandise were produced. As was the custom at the time with theatrical film productions rebroadcast on television, no actors appearing in the films were paid residuals for the revival. MGM prepared to distribute its own Our Gang shorts to television in 1957, and offers for the shorts to stations were issued beginning in 1958. The two separate packages of Our Gang films competed with each other in syndication for three decades. Some stations bought both packages and played them alongside each other under the Little Rascals show banner.

The television rights to the silent Pathé Our Gang comedies were sold to National Telepix and other distributors, who distributed the films under titles such as The Mischief Makers and Those Lovable Scallawags with Their Gangs.

=== King World's acquisition and edits ===
In 1963, Hal Roach Studios, operated by Roach's son Hal Jr., filed for bankruptcy. Struggling novice syndication agent Charles King purchased the television rights to The Little Rascals in the bankruptcy proceedings and returned the shorts to television. The success of The Little Rascals paved the way for King's new company, King World Productions, to become one of the largest television syndicators in the world. Paramount Global, King World's latest successor, currently owns distribution rights.

During the 1950s and 1960s, the NAACP, An American civil rights organization working on behalf of African-Americans, protested against the racial humor and the stereotyping of the black characters in the Our Gang films included in the Little Rascals TV package. After an NAACP campaign to remove the syndication package from the air began gaining traction and finding success with some local television stations, King World permitted the NAACP to supervise edits of the shorts in the Little Rascals package in 1971. Significant edits were performed, removing content deemed racist, stereotypical, or in generally poor taste. Many series entries were trimmed by two to four minutes, while others such as Spanky, Bargain Day, The Pinch Singer and Mush and Milk were cut to nearly half of their original lengths.

At the same time, eight Little Rascals shorts were removed from the King World television package altogether. Lazy Days, Moan and Groan, Inc., A Tough Winter (featuring Stepin Fetchit), Little Daddy, A Lad an' a Lamp, The Kid From Borneo, and Little Sinner were deleted from the syndication package because of purportedly racial material and stereotyping (mostly concerning African-Americans, although Moan and Groan, Inc. was also deleted because of Max Davidson's Jewish-American character). Big Ears was deleted for its content dealing with divorce and its depiction of children carelessly ingesting drugs from a medicine cabinet. The early talkie Railroadin' was never part of the television package because its soundtrack (recorded on Vitaphone phonographic records) was considered lost, although the soundtrack was found in the MGM vault in the late 1970s and restored to the film.

Turner Entertainment Co. acquired the pre-May 1986 MGM library in 1986, and the 1938–1944 MGM-produced Our Gang shorts were shown on Turner's TBS and TNT cable networks for many years as early-morning programming filler, with a regular slot on Sundays at 6 a.m. ET on TNT.

In the early 2000s, the 71 films in the King World package were reedited, reinstating many, but not all, of the edits performed in 1971 and the original Our Gang title cards. These new television prints debuted on AMC in 2001 and ran until 2003.

=== New Little Rascals productions ===
Many producers, including Our Gang alumnus Jackie Cooper, created pilots for new Little Rascals television series, but none ever went into production.

In 1977, Norman Lear tried to revive the franchise, taping three pilot episodes of The Little Rascals. The pilots were not bought, but were notable for including Gary Coleman.

1979 brought The Little Rascals Christmas Special, an animated Christmas special produced by Murakami-Wolf-Swenson, written by Romeo Muller and featuring the voice work of Darla Hood (who died suddenly before the special aired) and Matthew "Stymie" Beard.

From 1982 to 1984, Hanna-Barbera Productions produced a Saturday-morning cartoon version of The Little Rascals, which aired on ABC during The Pac-Man/Little Rascals/Richie Rich Show (later The Monchichis/Little Rascals/Richie Rich Show). It starred the voices of Patty Maloney as Darla; Peter Cullen as Petey and Officer Ed; Scott Menville as Spanky; Julie McWhirter Dees as Alfalfa, Porky and The Woim; Shavar Ross as Buckwheat, and B.J. Ward as Butch and Waldo.

In 1994, Amblin Entertainment and Universal Pictures released The Little Rascals, a feature film based loosely on the series and featuring interpretations of classic Our Gang shorts, including Hearts are Thumps, Rushin' Ballet, and Hi'-Neighbor! The film, directed by Penelope Spheeris, stars Travis Tedford as Spanky, Bug Hall as Alfalfa, and Ross Bagley as Buckwheat, with cameos by the Olsen twins, Whoopi Goldberg, Mel Brooks, Reba McEntire, Daryl Hannah, Donald Trump and Raven-Symoné. The Little Rascals was a moderate success for Universal, returning $51,764,950 at the box office.

In 2014, Universal Pictures released the direct-to-video film The Little Rascals Save the Day, a second film loosely based on the series and featuring interpretations of classic Our Gang shorts, including Helping Grandma, Mike Fright, and Birthday Blues. The film was directed by Alex Zamm and stars Jet Jurgensmeyer as Spanky, Drew Justice as Alfalfa, Eden Wood as Darla, and Doris Roberts as the kids' adopted grandmother.

== Legacy and influence ==
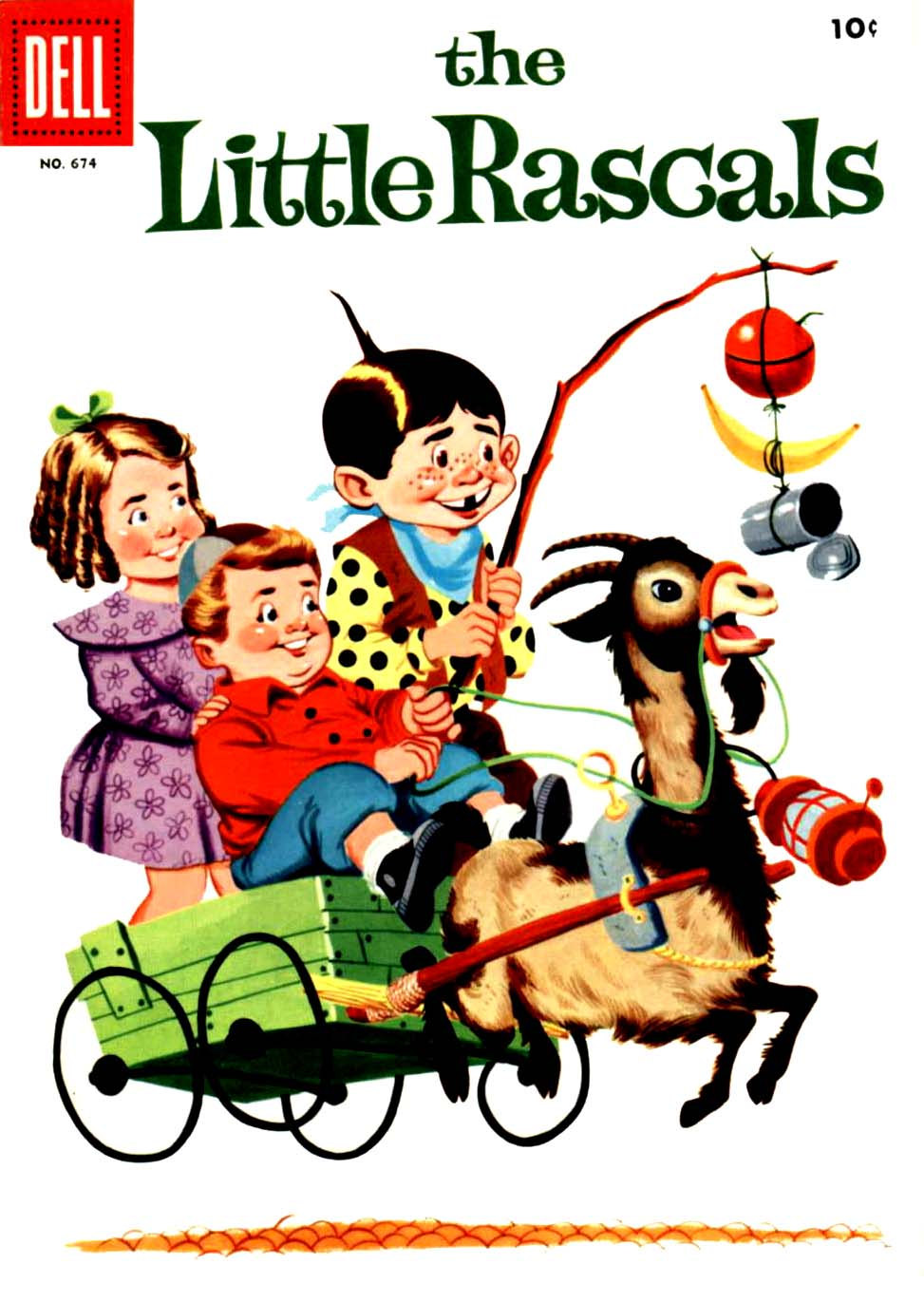
Painted cover to Four Color Comics number 674, featuring "The Little Rascals" (Dell, January 1956). Artist: David Gantz.

The characters in this series are well-known cultural icons, often identified solely by their first names. The characters of Alfalfa, Spanky, Buckwheat, Porky, Darla, Froggy, Butch, Woim, and Waldo were especially well known. As with many child actors, the Our Gang children were typecast and had trouble outgrowing their Our Gang images.

Several Our Gang alumni, including Carl "Alfalfa" Switzer, Scotty Beckett, Norman "Chubby" Chaney, Billy "Froggy" Laughlin, Donald Haines, Bobby "Wheezer" Hutchins, Darla Hood, Matthew "Stymie" Beard, Billie "Buckwheat" Thomas, and George "Spanky" McFarland, died before age 65, in some cases well earlier. This led to rumors of an Our Gang/Little Rascals "curse", rumors further popularized by a 2002 E! True Hollywood Story documentary entitled "The Curse of the Little Rascals". The Snopes.com website debunks the rumor of an Our Gang curse, stating that there was no pattern of unusual deaths when taking all of the major Our Gang stars into account, despite the deaths of a select few.

The children's work in the series was largely unrewarded in later years, although McFarland was awarded a star on the Hollywood Walk of Fame posthumously in 1994. No Our Gang children received any residuals or royalties from reruns of the shorts or licensed products with their likenesses. Their only pay was their weekly salaries when filming the shorts, ranging from $40 a week for newcomers to $200 or more weekly for stars such as Farina, Spanky, and Alfalfa.

Only a handful of Our Gang alumni sustained acting careers outside the series. Ernie Morrison appeared in several films as a member the East Side Kids in the early 1940s. Jackie Cooper had a long and successful career in feature films and television as an adolescent and adult actor, and later as a producer and director while pursuing a parallel career as a U.S. Navy officer. Cooper is especially known today for portraying Perry White in the 1978–1987 Superman movies, and for directing episodes of TV series such as M*A*S*H and Superboy. Dickie Moore, who had been a child actor before joining Our Gang, continued to perform child and teenage roles, appearing in over 100 films and television episodes, including co-starring with Shirley Temple in Miss Annie Rooney (1942) and as "The Kid" in the film noir classic Out of the Past (1947). Scotty Beckett had dozens of film and television roles until the mid-1950s, including playing the young Al Jolson in The Jolson Story (1946). Tommy Bond had a number of later film roles, including playing Jimmy Olsen in two 1940s Superman serials. Mickey Gubitosi later became Robert Blake and found great success in the 1960s and 1970s as an actor, particularly known for In Cold Blood (1967) and the television series Baretta (1975–78), which netted him an Emmy Award.

Mickey Daniels and Mary Kornman became two of the leads of The Boy Friends, an early sound (1930–32) Hal Roach short-subjects series pitched as a college-age version of Our Gang; both eventually left acting for other careers. Stymie Beard continued working as an actor in both Hollywood films and independent "race films" for African-American audiences until falling into heroin addiction in the 1940s as a young adult. He made a comeback in the 1970s as a middle-aged adult character actor on TV shows such as Good Times (1974–79) and films such as Truck Turner (1974) and The Buddy Holly Story (1978) following several years in rehab. Spanky McFarland had a notable run of supporting parts in outside Hollywood studio features while still in Our Gang, including supporting parts in Kentucky Kernels (1934) and The Trail of the Lonesome Pine (1936). However, McFarland left acting as a teenager following World War II. Several of the other former cast members had supporting or bit roles in later film or television productions, including Farina Hoskins (You Said a Mouthful, 1931), Alfalfa Switzer (It's a Wonderful Life, 1946), and Darla Hood (The Bat, 1959), but each eventually moved away from acting as a primary career. Several, including Billie "Buckwheat" Thomas and Eugene "Porky" Lee, did not choose to pursue adult roles.

The 1930 Our Gang short Pups is Pups was an inductee of the 2004 National Film Registry list.

E. L. Doctorow's 1975 novel Ragtime ends with the character of Tateh, a Jewish immigrant from Eastern Europe, having a vision of the kind of film he wants to make: "A bunch of children who were pals, white black, fat thin, rich poor, all kinds, mischievous little urchins who would have funny adventures in their own neighborhood, a society of ragamuffins, like all of us, a gang, getting into trouble and getting out again." The implication is that Tateh will go on to produce the Our Gang series.

Paul Beatty's 2015 satirical novel The Sellout, winner of the 2016 Booker Prize, features Hominy Jenkins, an elderly Black man, portrayed as the last surviving member of Our Gang, who insists on becoming the narrator's slave.

=== Imitators, followers, and frauds ===
Due to the popularity of Our Gang, many similar kid comedy short film series were created by competing studios. Among the most notable are The Kiddie Troupers, featuring future comedian Eddie Bracken; Baby Burlesks, featuring Shirley Temple; the Buster Brown comedies (from which Our Gang received Pete the Pup and director Gus Meins); and Our Gang's main competitor, the Toonerville Trolley-based Mickey McGuire series starring Mickey Rooney. Less notable imitations series include The McDougall Alley Gang (Bray Productions, 1927–1928), The Us Bunch and Our Kids. There is evidence that Our Gang-style productions were filmed in small towns and cities around the country using local children actors in the 1920s and 1930s. These productions did not appear to be affiliated with Hal Roach, but often used storylines from the shorts of the period, and sometimes went so far as to identify themselves as being Our Gang productions.

In later years, many adults falsely claimed to have been members of Our Gang. A long list of people, including persons famous in other capacities such as Nanette Fabray, Eddie Bracken, and gossip columnist Joyce Haber claimed to be or have been publicly called former Our Gang children. Bracken's official biography was once altered to state that he appeared in Our Gang instead of The Kiddie Troupers, although he himself had no knowledge of the change.

Among notable Our Gang imposters is Jack Bothwell, who claimed to have portrayed a character named "Freckles", going so far as to appear on the game show To Tell the Truth in the fall of 1957, perpetuating this fraud. In 2008, a Darla Hood impostor, Mollie Barron, died claiming to have appeared as Darla in Our Gang. Another is Bill English, a grocery store employee who appeared on the October 5, 1990, episode of the ABC investigative television newsmagazine 20/20 claiming to have been Buckwheat. Following the broadcast, Spanky McFarland informed the media of the truth, and in December, William Thomas, Jr. (son of Billie Thomas, the former child actor who played Buckwheat) filed a lawsuit against ABC for negligence.

=== Persons and entities named after Our Gang ===
A number of groups, companies, and entities have been inspired by or named after Our Gang. The folk-rock group Spanky and Our Gang was named for the troupe because lead singer Elaine "Spanky" McFarlane's last name was similar to that of George "Spanky" McFarland. The band had no connection with the actual Our Gang series.

Numerous unauthorized Little Rascals and Our Gang restaurants and day care centers also exist throughout the United States.

== Home media ==
=== 1951–1992: 16 mm and VHS releases ===
In the 1950s, home movie distributor Official Films released many of the Hal Roach talkies on 16 mm film. These were released as Famous Kid Comedies, as Official Films could not use Our Gang. The company's licensing only lasted for a short period. For years afterward, Blackhawk Films released 79 of the 80 Roach talkies on 8mm and 16 mm film. The sound discs for Railroadin' had been lost since the 1940s, and a silent print was available for home-movie release until 1982, when the film's sound discs were located in the MGM vault and the short was restored with sound. As with the television prints, Blackhawk's Little Rascals reissues featured custom title cards in place of the original Our Gang logos, per MGM's 1949 arrangement with Hal Roach not to distribute the series under its original title. The films were otherwise offered unedited.

In 1983, with the VHS home video market growing, Blackhawk began distributing Little Rascals VHS tapes through catalog orders, with three shorts per tape. Blackhawk Films was acquired in 1983 by National Telefilm Associates, later renamed Republic Pictures. Republic would release Little Rascals VHS volumes for retail purchase as incomplete collections through the rest of the 1980s and early 1990s. By then, all but 11 of the Roach-era sound films were available on home-video formats.

=== 1993–2011: Cabin Fever/Hallmark VHS and DVD releases ===
In 1993, Republic Pictures Home Video sold the home-video rights for the 80 sound Roach shorts and some available silent shorts to Cabin Fever Entertainment, which acquired the rights to use the original Our Gang title cards and MGM logos. For the first time in more than 50 years, the Roach sound Our Gang comedies were available in their original formats. The first 12 volumes of Cabin Fever's The Little Rascals VHS set were released on July 6, 1994, followed by nine more on July 11, 1995, coinciding with the theatrical and home-video releases of Universal's 1994 feature. Each tape contained four shorts, as well as newly produced introductions by film historian Leonard Maltin.

With these releases, Cabin Fever made all 80 Roach sound shorts, and four silents, available for purchase unedited with digitally restored picture and sound. On August 26, 1997, a limited-edition volume, For Pete's Sake, was released in honor of the series' 75th anniversary with an introduction from original cast member Tommy "Butch" Bond and "Petey", the dog from the 1994 feature. The video contained three previously released shorts and the previously unreleased silent short Dog Heaven, and the VHS tape was also available in a gift set with a Pete plush doll.

Cabin Fever began pressing DVD versions of its first 12 Little Rascals VHS volumes, with the contents of two VHS volumes included on each DVD, but the company folded in 1998 before the discs could be released. The Little Rascals home video rights were then sold to Hallmark Entertainment in 1999, which released the DVDs without an official launch while cleaning its warehouse in early 2000. Hallmark colorized a few Our Gang shorts and released them across eight VHS tapes. Later that year, the first 10 Cabin Fever volumes were rereleased on VHS with new packaging, and the first two volumes were released on DVD as The Little Rascals: Volumes 1–2. Two further Hallmark DVD collections featured ten shorts apiece and were released in 2003 and 2005.

From 2006 to 2009, Legend Films produced colorized versions of 24 Our Gang comedies (23 Roach entries, and the public-domain MGM film Waldo's Last Stand), which were released across five Little Rascals DVDs. In 2011, Legend Films released black-and-white versions of Little Rascals DVDs.

RHI Entertainment and Genius Products released an eight-disc DVD set, The Little Rascals–The Complete Collection, on October 28, 2008. This set includes all 80 Hal Roach-produced Our Gang sound short films. Most of the collection uses the 1994 restorations, while 16 shorts are presented with older Blackhawk Films transfers, as their remastered copies were lost or misplaced during preparations.

On June 14, 2011, Vivendi Entertainment rereleased seven of the eight DVDs from RHI/Genius Products' The Little Rascals-The Complete Collection as individual releases, including the 80 shorts (replacing the Blackhawk transfers on the previous set with their respective 1994 restorations) but excluding the disc featuring extra features.

=== 1980s–2016: MGM/Warner Bros. releases ===
During the 1980s and 1990s, MGM released several VHS tapes of shorts and a VHS of the feature General Spanky. After video rights for the classic MGM library reverted to their new owner, Warner Bros. (through Turner Entertainment Co.), in the late 1990s, four of the MGM Our Gang shorts appeared as bonus features on Warner Bros. DVD releases.

In 2009, Warner Home Video released all 52 MGM Our Gang shorts in a compilation titled The Our Gang Collection: 1938–1942 (although it also contains the 1943–44 shorts) for manufacture-on-demand (MOD) DVD and digital download. The set was made available by mail order and digital download as part of the Warner Archive Collection, and via the iTunes Store. A MOD release of General Spanky was also released by Warner Archive on DVD in 2016.

Many unofficial Our Gang and Little Rascals home-video collections have been released by distributors, comprising shorts (both silent and sound) that have fallen into the public domain.

=== 2021–2022: ClassicFlix restorations and releases ===
ClassicFlix, a company specializing in releasing classic films and TV series on home media, licensed the home video rights to Hal Roach's Our Gang sound shorts from the current owners, Sonar Entertainment.

An Indiegogo fundraiser campaign was launched to finance extensive restorations of the shorts from original 35mm nitrate film sources. When the campaign did not meet its fundraising goal, other sources of financing were sought for the restorations. The first ClassicFlix release, The Little Rascals: The ClassicFlix Restorations, Volume 1, was released on DVD and Blu-ray on June 1, 2021, featuring the first eleven "talking" short subjects in the series from 1929 and 1930. Five further volumes followed through June 2022, comprising the rest of the Hal Roach era shorts through 1938 in newly restored versions, as well as The Little Rascals: The Complete Collection Centennial Edition, containing all six volumes in DVD and Blu-ray formats, released in November 2022. In 2025, ClassicFlix released The Little Rascals: The Restored Silents-Volume One, which features eight restorations of early silent Our Gang shorts with new music scores, including the longest reconstructed version to date of the original 1922 short, Our Gang.

== Status of ownership ==
Currently, the rights to the Our Gang/Little Rascals shorts are divided.

Until its bankruptcy in 2024, Chicken Soup for the Soul Entertainment, through its subsidiary Halcyon Studios (formerly known as Sonar Entertainment, RHI Entertainment, Cabin Fever Entertainment and Hallmark Entertainment) had owned the copyrights of and held the theatrical rights to the 1929-1938 Roach-produced Our Gang shorts, The company acquired these after absorbing Hal Roach Studios in 1988, and both Roach's estate and Cabin Fever Entertainment in the late 1990s. The Crackle streaming service, a Chicken Soup for the Soul subsidiary, offered the SD Cabin Fever restorations of the sound era (1929-1938) Little Rascals shorts on its service until its closure in 2024 due to the parent company's Chapter 7 bankruptcy. Crackle also provided those shorts to YouTube for streaming with advertisements, where they remain as of 2026.

The current copyright status of the 1931-1938 shorts is unconfirmed, but their distribution rights continue to be held by Legend Films, Multicom Entertainment Group, ClassicFlix, and Shout! Studios, through agreements made before CSSE's bankruptcy.

In 2021, ClassicFlix acquired the rights to the entire Hal Roach-era Our Gang catalog (silent and sound) for home video and streaming release, and completed extensive 2K restorations of all 89 of the sound era (1929-1938) short subjects, by re-scanning from 35mm archival sources, and completing further restoration, image stabilization, and overall digital picture cleanup. In 2023, they began restorations of the silent-era (1922-1929) Our Gang catalog, with any available elements (some from this era are considered lost films).

Skydance Corporation and its acquisition of both Paramount Skydance and Warner Bros. Discovery reunites the Little Rascals trademark, other media rights to the 1931–1938 Roach shorts, which constitute The Little Rascals broadcast and cable television package, with certain territory exclusions controlled by Cinematographische Commerz-Anstalt, with the rights to the MGM produced Our Gang shorts from 1938-1944, the Our Gang trademark, and the earlier 1936 spin-off film General Spanky. It marks the first time they've been under one roof since Hal Roach sold his rights to television syndication in the 1950's

Skydance Corporation owned CBS offers original black-and-white and colorized prints for syndication. The King World/CBS Little Rascals package was featured as exclusive programming (in the United States) for AMC from August 2001 to December 2003, with child actor Frankie Muniz hosting. As part of a month-long tribute to Hal Roach Studios, Turner Classic Movies televised a 24-hour marathon of Roach Our Gang shorts – both sound films and silents – on January 4–5, 2011. Some of the silent Our Gangs (such as Mary, Queen of Tots and Thundering Fleas) resurfaced on TCM at this time with new music scores in stereo sound. As of 2026, the sound Little Rascals shorts in the CBS package air on the MeTV network's spinoff channel MeTV+ as part of its Comedy Classics block alongside Laurel and Hardy and The Three Stooges.

The riggts to the MGM-produced Our Gang shorts, the Our Gang trademark were acquired by Turner Entertainment Co., and General Spanky in 1986 when its founder, Ted Turner, purchased the pre-May 1986 MGM library; Turner merged with the former Time Warner in 1996. The television rights for the MGM Our Gang shorts belong to Warner Bros. Television Distribution, and the video rights to Warner Home Video. The MGM Our Gang shorts today appear periodically on Turner Classic Movies. Until its closure in 2018, the MGM Our Gang shorts were available for streaming via the subscription-based Warner Archive Instant streaming video service.

Any short released in 1930 or before is public domain, owing to the copyright law of the United States.

== Cast ==
The following is a listing of the primary child actors in the Our Gang comedies. They are grouped by the era during which they joined the series. Those not given nicknames, such as Jackie Cooper and Darla Hood, were usually addressed in the films by their own names. The last surviving cast members were probably Sidney Kibrick and Margaret Kerry, both of whom died in 2026

=== Roach silent period ===
- Peggy Ahern (1923–1927)
- Peggy Cartwright (1922)
- Joe Cobb (1923–1929)
- Jackie Condon (1922–1929)
- Mickey Daniels (1922–1926)
- Jean Darling (1927–1929)
- Jack Davis (1922–1923)
- Johnny Downs (1925–1927)
- Allen Hoskins as "Farina" (1922–1931)
- Bobby Hutchins as "Wheezer" (1927–1933)
- Eugene Jackson as "Pineapple" (1924–1925)
- Mary Ann Jackson (1928–1931)
- Mary Kornman (1923–1926)
- Scooter Lowry as "Skooter" (1926–1927)
- Ernie Morrison as "Sunshine Sammy" (1922—1924)
- Andy Samuel (1923–1924)
- Jay R. Smith (1925–1929)
- Harry Spear (1927–1929)
- Bobby Young as "Bonedust" (1925–1931)
- Pete the Pup (1929–1938)

=== Roach sound period ===
- Sherwood Bailey as "Spud" (1931-1932)
- Scotty Beckett (1934–1935)
- Matthew Beard as "Stymie" (1930–1935)
- Tommy Bond (1932–1934 as Tommy, 1937–1940 as "Butch")
- Norman Chaney as "Chubby" (1929–1931)
- Jackie Cooper (1929–1931)
- Dorothy DeBorba as "Echo" (1930–1933)
- Donald Haines (1929–1933)
- Darla Hood (1935–1941)
- Margaret Kerry (1935–1938)
- Sidney Kibrick (1933–1939) as "Woim"
- George McFarland as "Spanky" (1932–1942)
- Kendall McComas as "Breezy" Brisbane (1932)
- Dickie Moore (1932–1933)
- Eugene Gordon Lee as "Porky" (1935–1939)
- Darwood Kaye as "Waldo" (1937–1940)
- Shirley Jean Rickert (1931)
- Carl Switzer as "Alfalfa" (1935–1940)
- Jackie Lynn Taylor as Jane (1934)
- Billie Thomas as "Buckwheat" (1934–1944)
- Jerry Tucker (1931–1938)

=== MGM period ===
- Mickey Gubitosi (Robert Blake) (1939–1944)
- Janet Burston (1940–1944)
- Billy Laughlin as "Froggy" (1940–1944)

== Notable films ==
The following is a listing of selected Our Gang comedies, considered by Leonard Maltin and Richard W. Bann (in their book The Little Rascals: The Life and Times of Our Gang) to be among the best and most important in the series.

- 1923: The Champeen, Derby Day
- 1924: High Society
- 1925: Your Own Back Yard, One Wild Ride
- 1929: Small Talk, Cat, Dog & Co.
- 1930: The First Seven Years, Pups Is Pups, Teacher's Pet, School's Out
- 1931: Love Business, Little Daddy, Fly My Kite, Dogs Is Dogs
- 1932: Readin' and Writin', The Pooch, Free Wheeling, Birthday Blues
- 1933: Fish Hooky, Forgotten Babies, The Kid From Borneo, Mush and Milk, Bedtime Worries
- 1934: Hi'-Neighbor!, For Pete's Sake!, Mama's Little Pirate
- 1935: Anniversary Trouble, Shrimps for a Day, Beginner's Luck, Our Gang Follies of 1936
- 1936: Divot Diggers, Second Childhood
- 1937: Glove Taps, Hearts Are Thumps, Rushin' Ballet, Night 'n' Gales, Mail and Female, Framing Youth
- 1938: Three Men in a Tub, Hide and Shriek
- 1939: Alfalfa's Aunt, Cousin Wilbur
- 1940: Goin' Fishin', Kiddie Kure
- 1942: Going to Press
