= Marvin Hatley =

American composer of music for films (1905–1986)

Thomas Marvin Hatley (April 3, 1905 – August 26, 1986), professionally known simply as Marvin Hatley, was an American film composer and musical director, best known for his work for the Hal Roach studio from 1929 until 1940.

Hatley wrote many of the musical cues appearing in the Our Gang, Laurel and Hardy, and Charley Chase films. His most memorable composition is "Dance of the Cuckoos" (also known as "Ku-Ku", or "The Cookoo Song"), which serves as Laurel and Hardy's theme song. He was also the "player piano" (performing off-screen) in The Music Box (1932). His work in Laurel and Hardy's films Way Out West and Block-Heads earned him nominations for the Academy Award for Best Original Score.

In 1939, Hatley was fired from the Roach studio. At the insistence of Stan Laurel, however, he did return to score one final Laurel & Hardy film, Saps at Sea. Hatley went on to become a lounge pianist, and often remarked that he earned more money in that career than during his days at the Roach studio.

Marvin Hatley was a native of Reed, Oklahoma. He died on August 26, 1986, in Hollywood, California.

== Selected filmography ==
- I'll Sell My Life (1941)
- Uncle Joe (1941)
