= Stymie Beard =

American actor (1925-1981)

Matthew Beard
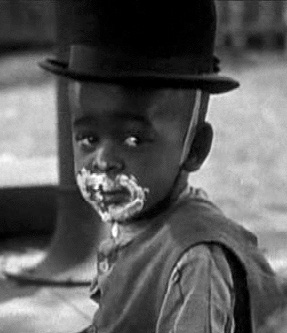
- Beard as "Stymie" in School's Out
- Born: Matthew Beard Jr. January 1, 1925; Los Angeles, California, U.S.
- Died: January 8, 1981 (aged 56); Los Angeles, California, U.S.
- Resting place: Evergreen Cemetery, Los Angeles
- Occupation: Actor
- Years active: 1927–1981

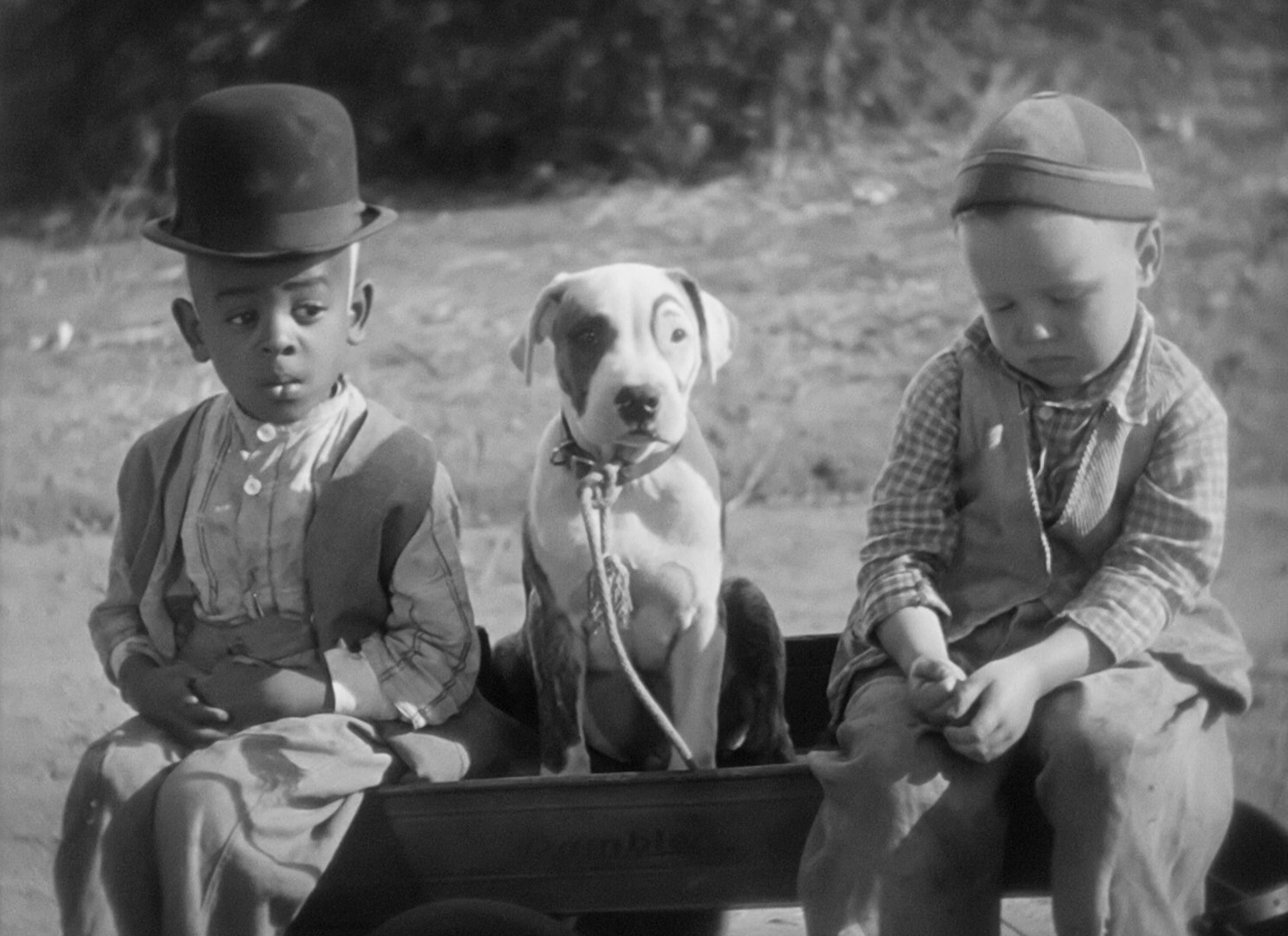
Beard, Pete the Pup, and Bobby Hutchins in School's Out (1930)

Matthew Beard Jr. (January 1, 1925 – January 8, 1981) was an American actor. As a child actor, he was most famous for playing Stymie in the Our Gang short comedy films of 1930–1935. The role was so well known that he adopted the name Stymie Beard, and was so credited in some later roles, such as his 1978 appearance in The Buddy Holly Story.

== Early life ==
Beard was born near Los Angeles, California, to Matthew Beard Sr. and Johnnie Mae Beard (née Clay). His father was the founding pastor of Beloved Church of God in Christ in Los Angeles.

== Our Gang years ==
Beard previously played baby parts in many films, then signed a five-year contract in 1930 to appear in Our Gang. In contrast to Farina, the character whom he replaced, Stymie was a slick-tongued con-artist who was self-assured, nonchalant and ready with a sly comment and clever ideas to solve the problems that he faced. He could offer sound common sense that helped resolve his playmates' dilemmas.

The character's trademark was a bald head crowned by an oversize derby hat, a gift to Beard from comedian Stan Laurel, who also worked under Our Gang creator Hal Roach. Stymie is the only member of Our Gang who both replaced one of the original gang members (Allen "Farina" Hoskins) and was in turn replaced by one who stayed until the series disbanded: Billie "Buckwheat" Thomas.

The character was originally to be named "Hercules"; however, Our Gang director Robert McGowan, frustrated ("stymied") by little Matthew's curious wanderings around the studio, gave him the name "Stymie." McGowan later recalled that Stymie was his favorite of all the Our Gang kids. The then-five-year-old Beard came to the series a year after the transition from the silent/early sound era, and had the distinction of being with the Gang from the sound movies of the early 1930s through the transitional period of the mid-1930s.

In 1934, Roach Studios lent Beard and other Our Gang kids to Samuel Goldwyn Productions for Eddie Cantor's Kid Millions, in which they appeared in the Technicolor "ice cream fantasy" finale sequence.

== Family ==
Beard's paycheck helped support his family in East Los Angeles, including 13 brothers and sisters. After Beard renamed his younger brother Bobbie "Cotton" (which was used as the name of one of the Our Gang characters), his parents allowed him to name all of the rest of his siblings as they were born. He named one Dickie after Dickie Moore, another member of Our Gang and Beard's best friend. Four other members of the Beard family appear in the Our Gang comedies:

- His younger sister Betty Jane Beard preceded Stymie in the gang, playing Farina's little brother Hector in Moan & Groan, Inc. and When the Wind Blows (although she was a girl).
- His younger sister Carlena Beard appears as Stymie's younger sister in Shiver My Timbers, Readin' and Writin' and For Pete's Sake!.
- His younger brother Bobbie Beard appears in six Our Gang shorts from 1932 to 1934 as Stymie's younger brother Cotton.
- His mother Johnnie Mae Beard has cameos as Stymie's mother in Big Ears and Free Wheeling.

Beard's younger brother Renee Beard appears in two of Hal Roach's featurettes of the 1940s, Curley and Who Killed Doc Robbin, both produced as revivals of the Our Gang idea.

== Later years ==
After Beard left the series in 1935 at age 10, he acted in minor roles in feature films such as Captain Blood (1935) and Jezebel (1938). At age 15, he appears as Mose the bellboy in the 1940 film The Return of Frank James. Beard also appeared in supporting roles in several independent "race films" aimed at African-American audiences, including Two Gun Man from Harlem (1938) with Herb Jeffries and Broken Strings (1940) with Clarence Muse. Parts dried up as Beard became an older teenager; by the time he was an adult, Beard had retired from acting.

Falling into drug use and street life, Beard was arrested at age eighteen for stealing to fuel a budding marijuana habit. Upon his release, he became addicted to heroin and spent most of his early adult life in and out of jail on drug and theft charges.

In the 1960s, Beard checked himself into Synanon, a drug rehabilitation facility and cult in Los Angeles and successfully ended his heroin use. After leaving Synanon, he made a small comeback, appearing in small roles in feature films and guest-starring in episodes of television shows such as Sanford and Son, Emergency! and The Jeffersons. He appears in episodes of Maude as a resident of an apartment complex where the title character's husband temporarily lived, and on Good Times, where he had a recurring role (1974–1977) as Monty. Beard also lectured around the United States on drug-abuse awareness.

In 1978, he appeared in the film The Buddy Holly Story as a member of the backstage crew at the Apollo Theater, wearing his trademark derby hat.

== Death ==
Beard suffered a stroke on January 3, 1981, two days after his 56th birthday, sustained head injuries from falling down a flight of stairs, and died of pneumonia on January 8, 1981. He was living in Los Angeles at the time.

He is interred in the Evergreen Cemetery in Los Angeles, buried with the famous derby that he wore for all of his life.

== Filmography ==
Year	Title	Role	Notes
1927	My Best Girl	Child	Uncredited
1927	Uncle Tom's Cabin	Child	Uncredited
1929	Hearts in Dixie	Child	Uncredited
1929	Show Boat	Child	Uncredited
1929	Hallelujah	Child	Uncredited
1930	Mamba	Native Boy	Uncredited
1934	Kid Millions	Little Boy in Ice Cream Number	Uncredited
1935	Captain Blood	Governor's Attendant	Uncredited
1935	The Littlest Rebel	Black Boy	Uncredited
1936	The Prisoner of Shark Island	Boy Seeking Dr. Mudd	Uncredited
1936	Grand Jury	Marshmallow	Uncredited
1936	Rainbow on the River	Lilybell Jones	Uncredited
1937	Penrod and Sam	Buzz	Uncredited
1937	Slave Ship	Black Boy on Pier	Uncredited
1938	Jezebel	Ti Bat	
1938	The Beloved Brat	Pinkie White	
1938	Two-Gun Man from Harlem	Jimmy Thompson	
1938	Kentucky	Black Child	Uncredited
1939	The Great Man Votes	Davy's Friend	Uncredited
1939	Outside These Walls	Penny	Uncredited
1939	Way Down South	Gumbo	
1939	Swanee River	Black Boy	Uncredited
1940	The Return of Frank James	Mose	
1941	Belle Starr	Young Jake	Uncredited
1942	Broken Strings	Dickey Morley	
1943	Stormy Weather	Stagehand	Uncredited
1944	The Bridge of San Luis Rey	Pancho	Uncredited
1945	Fallen Angel	Shoeshine Boy	Uncredited
1947	Dead Reckoning	Bellboy	Uncredited
1947	The Burning Cross	Shoe Shine Boy	Uncredited
1953	The Vanquished	Dr. Colfax's Stableboy	Uncredited
1973-74	Sanford and Son (3 episodes)	Otis Littlejohn	
1974	Truck Turner	Jail Guard	
1974	Good Times	Monty	
1976	Emergency!	Bar Owner	
1977	Disco 9000	Harold Jackson	
1978	The Buddy Holly Story	Luther	
1980	Pray TV	Willie Washington, Usher	

== Legacy ==
In the book series Captain Underpants, one of the kids is named George Beard. The author Dav Pilkey loved Our Gang, so he named the character's last name after Beard.

== Additional reading ==
- Holmstrom, John. The Moving Picture Boy: An International Encyclopaedia from 1895 to 1995, Norwich, Michael Russell, 1996, p. 132.
- Dye, David. Child and Youth Actors: Filmography of Their Entire Careers, 1914-1985. Jefferson, NC: McFarland & Co., 1988, pp. 13–14.
- Willson, Dixie. Little Hollywood Stars, Akron, OH, and New York: Saalfield Pub. Co., 1935.
