= Boxing Gloves (film) =

1929 short film by Anthony Mack

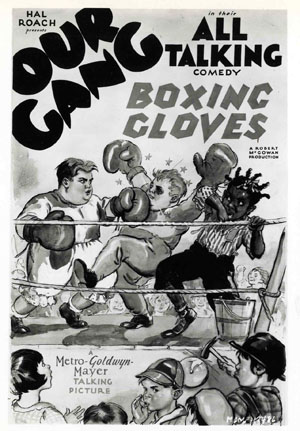
- Film poster
- Directed by: Anthony Mack
- Written by: Robert F. McGowan; Hal Roach; H. M. Walker
- Produced by: Robert F. McGowan; Hal Roach
- Starring: Joe Cobb; Norman Chaney; Allen Hoskins; Jean Darling; Harry Spear; Mary Ann Jackson; Bobby Hutchins; Jackie Cooper
- Cinematography: F. E. Hershey; Art Lloyd
- Edited by: Richard C. Currier
- Music by: Ray Henderson
- Distributed by: MGM
- Release date: September 9, 1929
- Running time: 17:21
- Country: United States
- Language: English

Boxing Gloves is a 1929 Our Gang short comedy film, the 90th in the series, directed by Anthony Mack.

== Plot ==
Boxing Gloves (1929)

Best friends Joe and Chubby's friendship is tested when their affections for Jean cause them to fight. Farina and Harry have been unsuccessfully trying to become fight promoters and see the feud as the basis of a boxing match.

== Production notes ==
Boxing Gloves is a remake of the 1923 silent entry The Champeen. It is the final appearance of Joe Cobb and marks the film debut of Jackie Cooper, who later enjoyed a successful career both with and after Our Gang.

The third Our Gang sound short, Boxing Gloves was advertised as "all-talking", although much of the film consists of silent footage without overdubbed sound. It is now the earliest Our Gang entry included in the Little Rascals television syndication package.

== Cast ==
- Norman Chaney as Chubby Chaney
- Joe Cobb as Joe Cobb
- Jean Darling as Jean
- Allen Hoskins as Farina
- Bobby Hutchins as Wheezer
- Mary Ann Jackson as Mary Ann
- Harry Spear as Harry
- Pete the Pup as himself
- Jackie Cooper as First angry spectator/Reporter at fight
- Bobby Mallon as Announcer Graham McCracker
- Andy Shuford as Chubby's trainer
- Donnie Smith as Donnie
- Charlie Hall as Sidewalk diner attendant
- Johnny Aber as Extra
- Godfrey "Duffy" Craig as Extra
- Bill Johnson as Undetermined role
- Billy Schuler as Undetermined role

== See also ==
- Our Gang filmography
- List of boxing films
