= Wiggle Your Ears =

1929 film

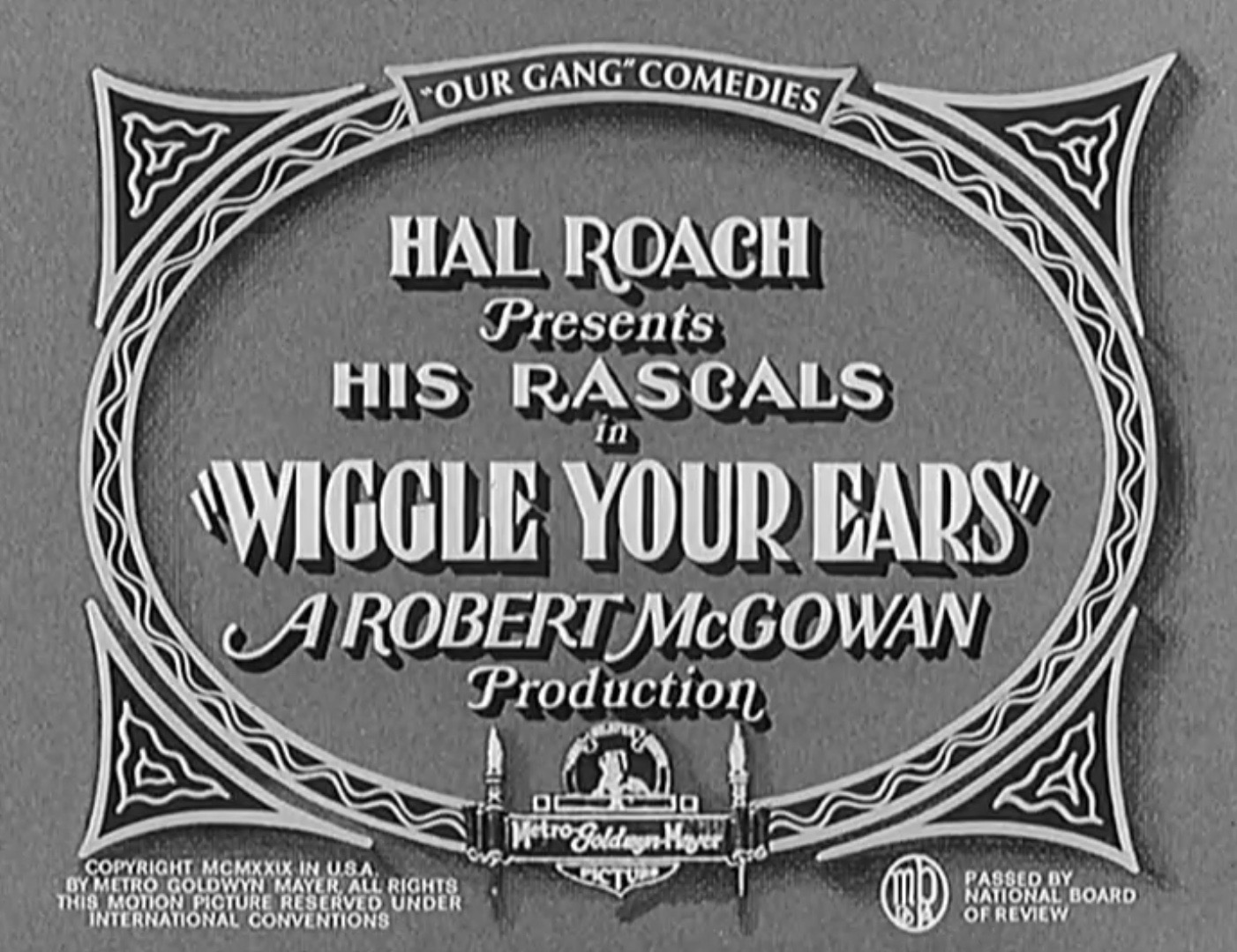
- Directed by: Robert F. McGowan
- Written by: Anthony Mack; H. M. Walker
- Produced by: Robert F. McGowan; Hal Roach
- Starring: Joe Cobb; Jean Darling; Allen Hoskins; Bobby Hutchins; Mary Ann Jackson; Harry Spear; Pete the Pup
- Cinematography: Art Lloyd
- Edited by: Richard C. Currier
- Music by: Ray Henderson
- Distributed by: MGM
- Release date: April 6, 1929
- Running time: 20:51
- Country: United States
- Languages: Silent; English intertitles

Wiggle Your Ears is a 1929 Our Gang short silent comedy film, the 84th in the series, directed by Robert F. McGowan.

== Cast ==
=== The Gang ===
- Joe Cobb as Joe
- Jean Darling as Jean
- Allen Hoskins as Farina
- Bobby Hutchins as Wheezer
- Mary Ann Jackson as Mary Ann
- Harry Spear as Harry
- Pete the Pup as himself

== See also ==
- Our Gang filmography
