= Spook–Spoofing =

1928 film

Spook-Spoofing
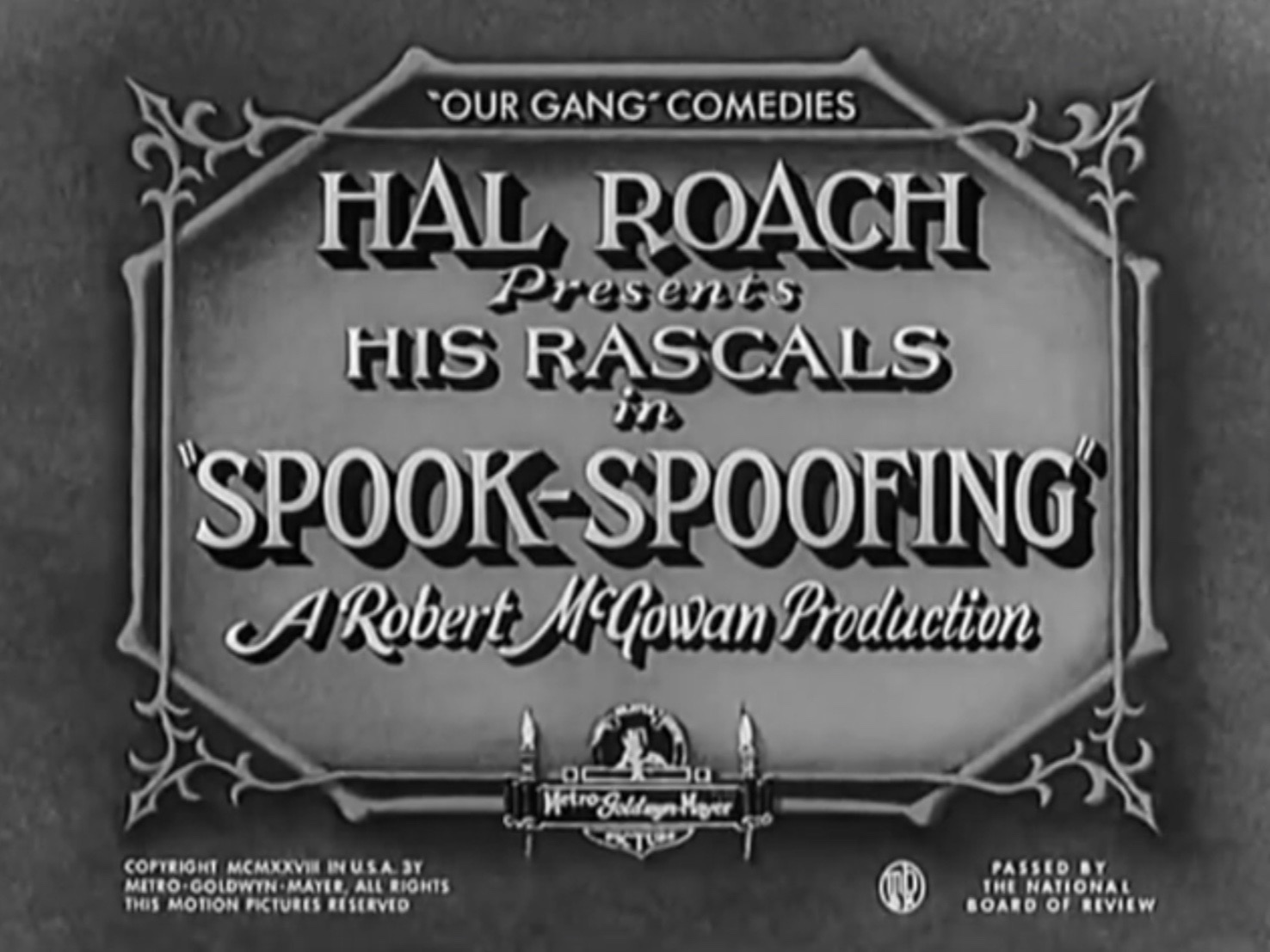
- Directed by: Robert F. McGowan
- Written by: Reed Heustis; Anthony Mack
- Produced by: Robert F. McGowan; Hal Roach
- Starring: Joe Cobb; Jackie Condon; Allen Hoskins; Bobby Hutchins; Mildred Kornman; Jay R. Smith; Harry Spear; Bobby Dean; Johnny Aber; Pete the Pup; Charles A. Bachman; Charles Lloyd
- Cinematography: Art Lloyd
- Edited by: Richard C. Currier
- Distributed by: Metro-Goldwyn-Mayer
- Release date: January 14, 1928
- Running time: 31:22
- Country: United States
- Languages: Silent; English intertitles

Spook–Spoofing is a 1928 Our Gang short silent comedy film, the 70th in the series, directed by Robert F. McGowan.

== Plot ==
The gang mercilessly taunt and bully superstitious Farina, who retaliates with a magic charm on Harry, who plays dead, and the gang encourage Farina to bury the “corpse”.

== Production ==
At more than 31 minutes in length, Spook-Spoofing is the longest silent Our Gang short produced. It was initially included in the Little Rascals television package but was later withdrawn for perceived racial insensitivities.

Spook-Spoofing is Bobby Dean's only one Our Gang film. He was originally chosen as a replacement for Joe Cobb after Joe outgrew his role, but Dean died in 1929.

Jean Darling does not appear in this film but is featured in promotional photos.

== Cast ==
=== The Gang ===
- Joe Cobb as Joe
- Jackie Condon as Jackie
- Allen Hoskins as Farina
- Bobby Hutchins as Wheezer
- Mildred Kornman as Mildred
- Jay R. Smith as Jay, the Undertaker's son
- Harry Spear as Harry
- Bobby Dean as Other fat boy
- Pete the Pup as himself

=== Additional cast ===
- Johnny Aber as First boy running
- Charles A. Bachman as Policeman
- Charles Lloyd as Vendor selling the eclipse glasses

== See also ==
- Our Gang filmography
