= The Ol' Gray Hoss =

1928 film

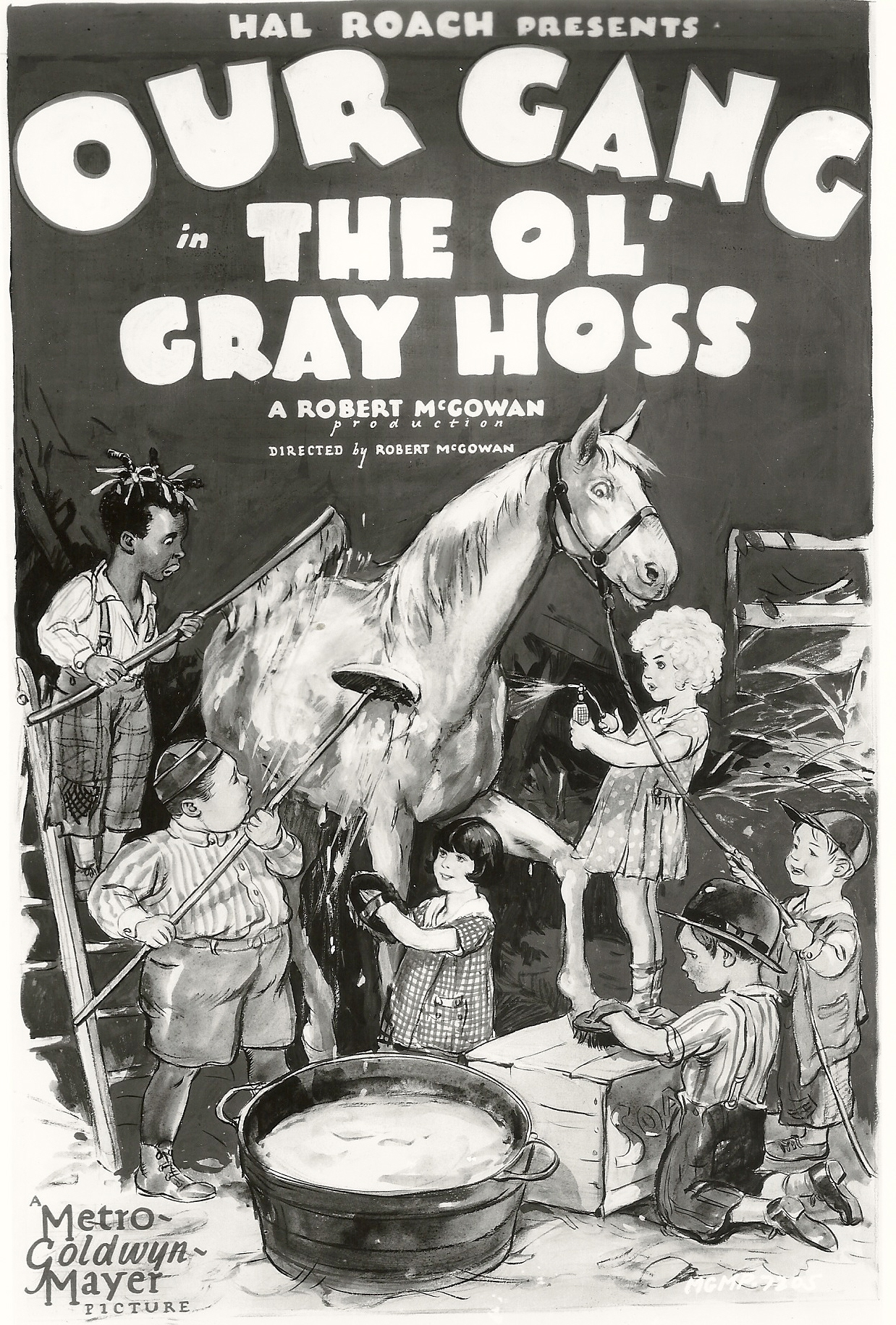
- Film poster
- Directed by: Anthony Mack
- Written by: Anthony Mack; H. M. Walker
- Produced by: Robert F. McGowan; Hal Roach
- Starring: Joe Cobb; Jean Darling; Allen Hoskins; Mary Ann Jackson; Bobby Hutchins; Harry Spear; Jimmy Farren; Pete the Pup; Charles A. Bachman; Richard Cummings
- Cinematography: Art Lloyd
- Edited by: Richard C. Currier
- Distributed by: Metro-Goldwyn-Mayer
- Release date: October 20, 1928
- Running time: 20:23
- Country: United States
- Languages: Silent; English intertitles

The Ol' Gray Hoss is a 1928 Our Gang short silent comedy film, the 78th in the series, directed by Anthony Mack.

== Cast ==
=== The Gang ===
- Joe Cobb as Joe
- Jean Darling as Jean
- Allen Hoskins as Farina
- Bobby Hutchins as Wheezer
- Mary Ann Jackson as Mary Ann
- Harry Spear as Harry
- Jimmy Farren as Our Gang member
- Pete the Pup as himself

=== Additional cast ===
- Charles A. Bachman as Officer Mulligan
- Richard Cummings as Chief Cummings
- Mary Gordon as First taxi passenger
- Tenen Holtz as Bearded man
- Charles A. Millsfield as man getting splattered
- Ellinor Vanderveer as Dowager
- Charley Young as Creditor

== See also ==
- Our Gang filmography
