= Crazy House (1928 film) =

1928 film

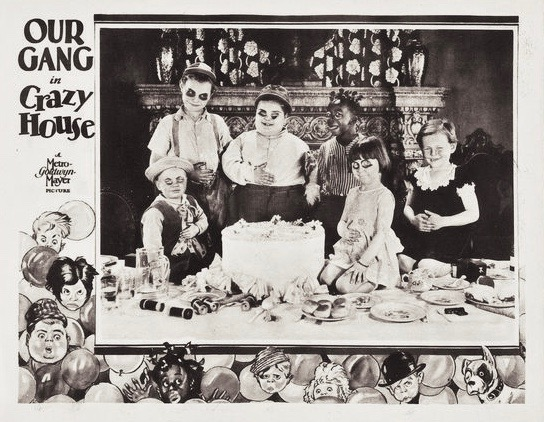
- Lobby card
- Directed by: Robert F. McGowan
- Written by: H. M. Walker
- Produced by: Robert F. McGowan; Hal Roach
- Starring: Jean Darling; Joe Cobb; Jackie Condon; Allen Hoskins; Bobby Hutchins; Mary Ann Jackson; Jay R. Smith; Harry Spear; Jimmy Farren; Pete the Pup; George W. Girard; May Wallace
- Cinematography: Art Lloyd
- Edited by: Richard C. Currier
- Distributed by: Metro-Goldwyn-Mayer
- Release date: June 2, 1928
- Running time: 21:45
- Country: United States
- Languages: Silent; English intertitles

Crazy House is a 1928 Our Gang short silent comedy film, the 76th in the series, directed by Robert F. McGowan.

== Cast ==
=== The Gang ===
- Jean Darling as Jean
- Joe Cobb as Joe
- Jackie Condon as Jackie
- Allen Hoskins as Farina
- Bobby Hutchins as Wheezer
- Mary Ann Jackson as Mary Ann
- Jay R. Smith as Percy
- Harry Spear as Harry
- Jimmy Farren as Our Gang member
- Pete the Pup as Pansy

=== Additional cast ===
- Bill Ulmer as Kid watching the fight
- Ben Parsons as Kid watching the fight
- Eugene "Bobo" Pearson as Kid watching the fight
- Charles A. Bachman as Officer
- Ed Brandenburg as Workman
- George W. Girard as Percy's father
- F. F. Guenste as Butler
- Eric Mayne a Friend of Percy's father
- May Wallace as Jean's mother
- Kathleen Chambers as Undetermined role

== See also ==
- Our Gang filmography
