= Moan and Groan, Inc. =

1929 Our Gang short film

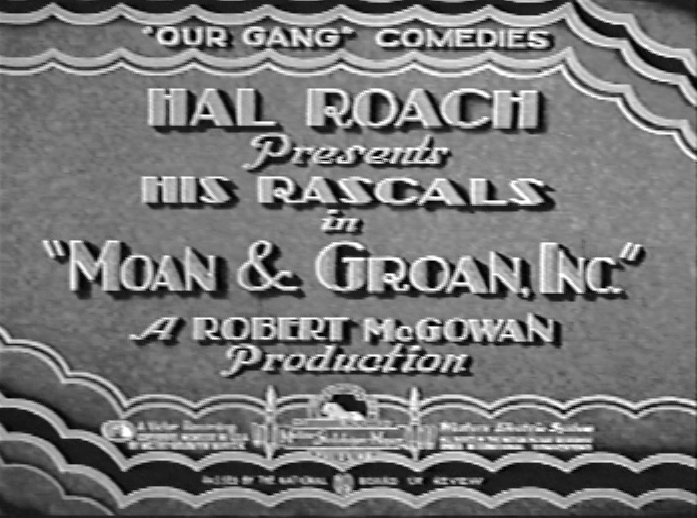
- Directed by: Robert F. McGowan
- Written by: Robert F. McGowan; H.M. Walker
- Produced by: Robert F. McGowan; Hal Roach
- Starring: Edgar Kennedy; Max Davidson; Allen Hoskins; Norman Chaney; Mary Ann Jackson; Jackie Cooper; Bobby Hutchins
- Cinematography: F. E. Hershey; Art Lloyd
- Edited by: Richard C. Currier
- Distributed by: MGM
- Release date: December 7, 1929
- Running time: 20' 36"
- Country: United States
- Language: English

Moan and Groan, Inc. is a 1929 Our Gang short comedy film, the 94th in the series, directed by Robert F. McGowan.

== Plot ==
Moan and Groan, Inc. (1929)

Friendly neighborhood policeman Kennedy the Cop suggests that the kids dig for buried treasure, and they do so in the basement of an old abandoned house, which is inhabited by a homeless lunatic who takes giddy delight in scaring the children, particularly Farina. Kennedy eventually arrives at the house to save the kids and apprehend the lunatic.

== Notes ==
Moan and Groan, Inc. features a short appearance by former Our Gang kid Jay R. Smith, his only appearance in a sound Our Gang short and his final appearance in the series.

Because of its reliance upon supposed Irish American, Jewish American and African American stereotypes, Moan and Groan, Inc. was deleted from King World's Little Rascals television package in 1971.

== Cast ==
=== The Gang ===
- Norman Chaney as Chubby
- Jackie Cooper as Jackie
- Allen Hoskins as Farina
- Bobby Hutchins as Wheezer
- Mary Ann Jackson as Mary Ann
- Bobby Mallon as Bobby
- Pete the Pup as Himself

=== Additional cast ===
- Betty Jane Beard as Trellis, Farina's baby brother
- Jay R. Smith as Kid with Japanese handcuffs
- Max Davidson as The Lunatic
- Edgar Kennedy as Kennedy the Cop

== See also ==
- Our Gang filmography
