= Bouncing Babies =

1929 film

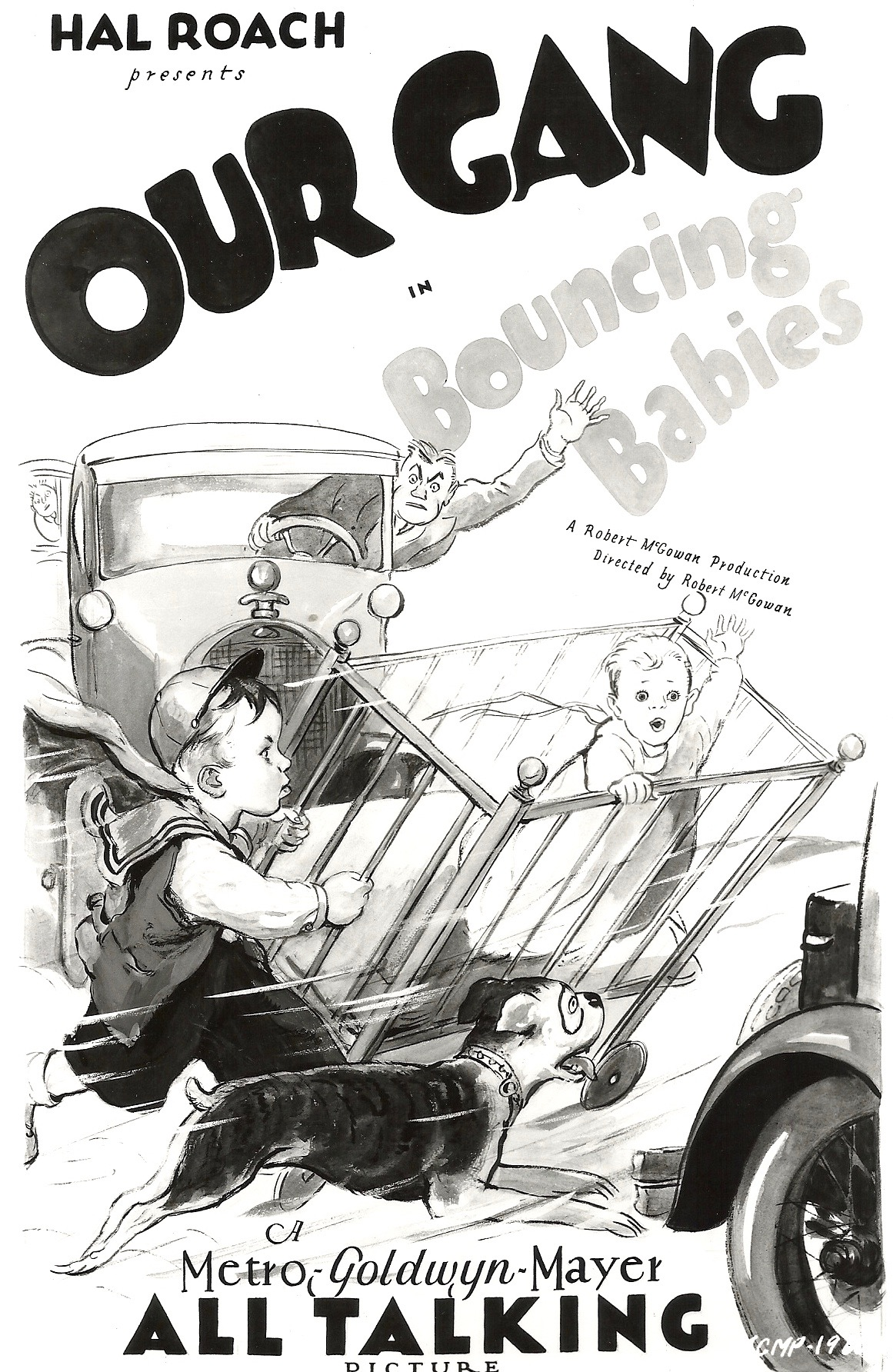
- Directed by: Robert F. McGowan
- Written by: Robert F. McGowan; H. M. Walker
- Produced by: Robert F. McGowan; Hal Roach
- Starring: Bobby Hutchins; Mary Ann Jackson; Dora Dean; Allen Hoskins; Jean Darling; Harry Spear; Jackie Cooper; Norman Chaney; Pete the Pup; Bobby Mallon; Eddie Dunn; Lyle Tayo
- Cinematography: F. E. Hershey; Art Lloyd
- Edited by: Richard C. Currier
- Distributed by: Metro-Goldwyn-Mayer
- Release date: October 12, 1929
- Running time: 20:46
- Country: United States
- Language: English

Bouncing Babies is a 1929 Our Gang short comedy film, the 92nd in the series, directed by Robert F. McGowan.

== Plot ==
Bouncing Babies (1929)

Wheezer is jealous of his baby brother, who receives all of the attention from his family while Wheezer is ignored and expected to behave like a "big boy". After a failed attempt to prepare his own breakfast, for which he is spanked, Wheezer attempts to run away from home with Pete the Pup. After he meets Farina, they become the targets of Halloween pranks from the gang in their costumes.

Farina tells Wheezer a tall tale about trading an unwanted baby sibling for a goat and inspires Wheezer to try the same. However, when Wheezer arrives at the hospital with the baby carriage, which he does not know holds Mary Ann's doll rather than the baby, in order to exchange the baby for a goat. A nurse plays along but phones Wheezer's mother to inform her. Wheezer's mother and his sister Mary Ann pretend to be distraught over the baby's disappearance.

After seeing his mother crying, Wheezer is remorseful and rushes back to the hospital to retrieve his brother, but the nurse informs him that it is too late. Wheezer returns home alone and his mother tells him to pray for the baby to return. Wheezer begins praying and the baby emerges from of hiding and knock him on the head.

== Cast notes ==
Bouncing Babies marks the last Our Gang comedy for Jean Darling and Harry Spear. Some sources also list Joe Cobb as a cast member, but he does not appear in the film.

== Cast ==
=== The Gang ===
- Norman Chaney as Chubby
- Jean Darling as Jean
- Allen Hoskins as Farina
- Bobby Hutchins as Wheezer
- Mary Ann Jackson as Mary Ann
- Harry Spear as Harry
- Pete the Pup as himself

=== Additional cast ===
- Jackie Cooper as Kid listening to Farina's story
- Bobby Mallon as Kid listening to Farina's story
- Dora Dean as Mrs. Dean, the mother
- Eddie Dunn as Eddie, the father
- Lyle Tayo as Nurse
- Tommy Atkins as Wheezer's little brother (unconfirmed)

== See also ==
- Our Gang filmography
- List of films set around Halloween
