= Dog Heaven =

1927 film

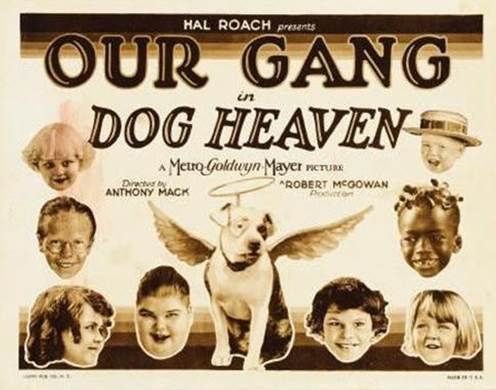
- Lobby card
- Directed by: Anthony Mack
- Written by: H. M. Walker
- Produced by: Robert F. McGowan; Hal Roach
- Cinematography: Art Lloyd
- Edited by: Richard C. Currier
- Distributed by: MGM
- Release date: December 17, 1927
- Running time: 31 minutes
- Country: United States
- Languages: Silent; English intertitles

Dog Heaven is a 1927 Our Gang short silent comedy film, the 68th in the series, directed by Anthony Mack.

== Cast ==
=== The Gang ===
- Joe Cobb as Joe
- Jackie Condon as Jackie
- Jean Darling as Jean
- Allen Hoskins as Farina
- Bobby Hutchins as Wheezer
- Mildred Kornman as Mildred
- Jay R. Smith as Jay
- Pete the Pup as himself

=== Additional cast ===
- Annette De Kirby as Clarabelle
- Charles A. Bachman as Officer
- Ed Brandenburg as Young lover on park bench
- Lyle Tayo as Lady at accident scene
- Charley Young as man in wheelchair

== See also ==
- Our Gang filmography
