= Fast Freight (film) =

1929 film

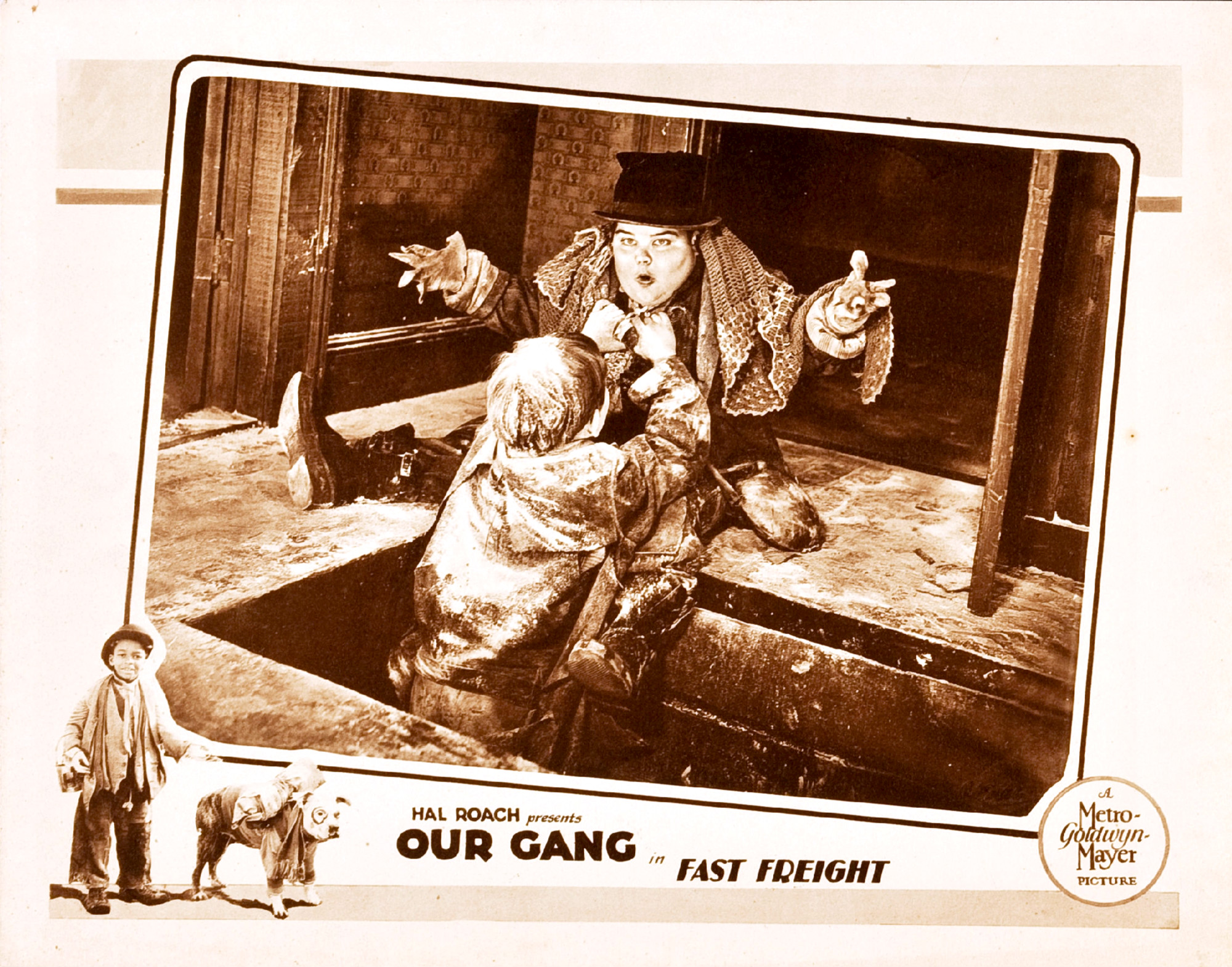
- Lobby card
- Written by: Anthony Mack; H. M. Walker
- Produced by: Robert F. McGowan; Hal Roach
- Cinematography: Art Lloyd
- Edited by: Richard C. Currier
- Production company: Hal Roach Studios
- Distributed by: Metro-Goldwyn-Mayer
- Release date: May 4, 1929
- Running time: 20 minutes
- Country: United States
- Language: Silent (English intertitles)

Fast Freight is a 1929 American short silent comedy film, the 85th in the series.

== Cast ==
=== The Gang ===
- Joe Cobb as Joe
- Jean Darling as Jean
- Allen Hoskins as Farina
- Bobby Hutchins as Wheezer
- Mary Ann Jackson as Mary Ann
- Harry Spear as Harry
- Pete the Pup as himself

=== Additional cast ===
- Robert Dudley as Chief of Police

== See also ==
- Our Gang filmography
