= The Old Wallop =

1927 film

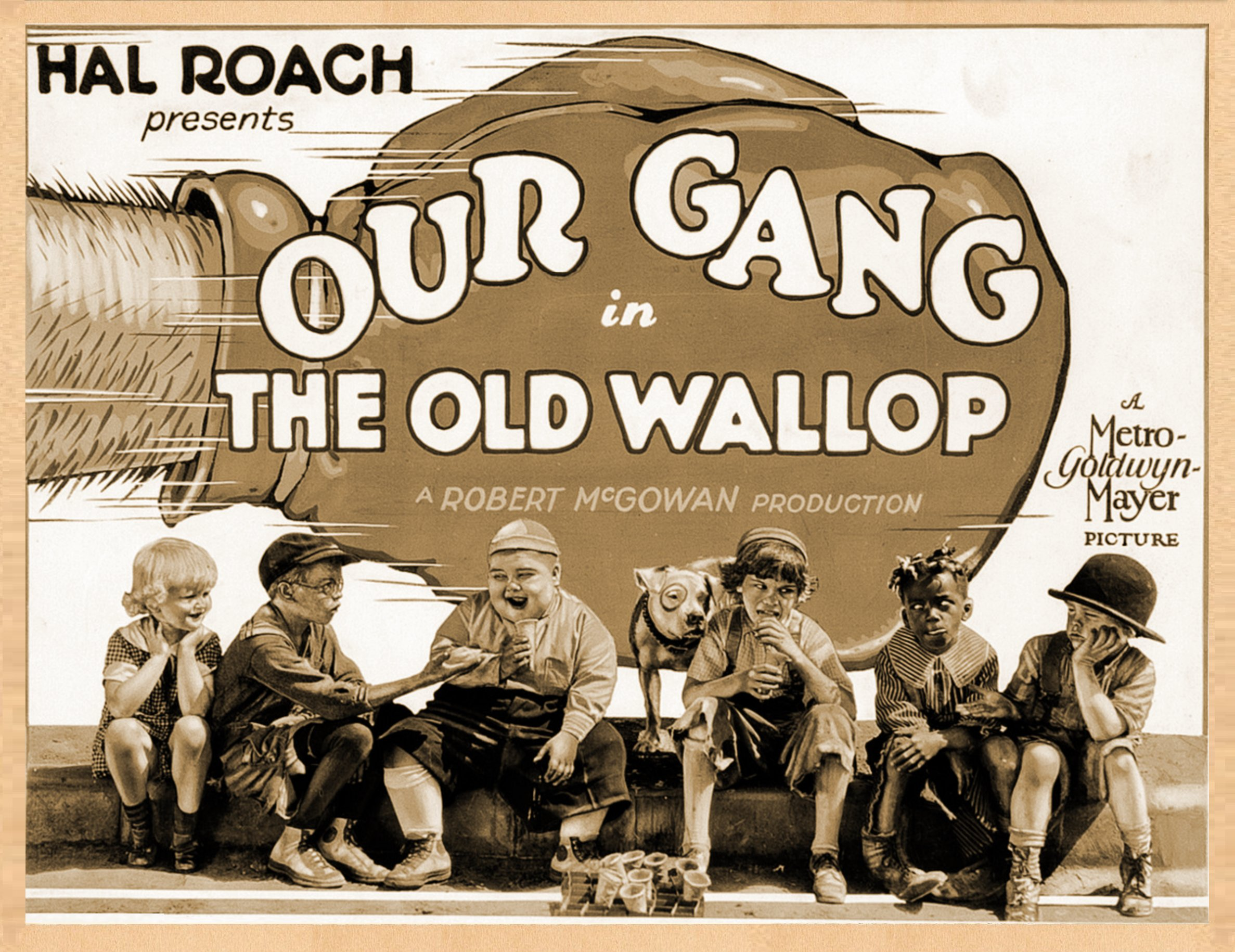
- Film poster
- Directed by: Robert F. McGowan
- Written by: H. M. Walker
- Produced by: Robert F. McGowan; Hal Roach
- Starring: Joe Cobb; Jackie Condon; Jean Darling; Allen Hoskins; Bobby Hutchins; Jay R. Smith; Harry Spear; Pete the Pup; Anita Garvin; Charles A. Bachman; Edgar Dearing
- Cinematography: Art Lloyd
- Edited by: Richard C. Currier
- Distributed by: Metro-Goldwyn-Mayer
- Release date: October 22, 1927
- Running time: 20 minutes
- Country: United States
- Languages: Silent; English intertitles

The Old Wallop is a 1927 Our Gang short silent comedy film, the 65th in the series, directed by Robert F. McGowan. It had been considered a lost film, as it was destroyed in the 1965 MGM vault fire, but a nearly complete print was discovered in Munich in the 1970s.

== Cast ==
=== The Gang ===
- Joe Cobb as Joe
- Jackie Condon as Jackie
- Jean Darling as Jean
- Allen Hoskins as Farina
- Bobby Hutchins as Wheezer
- Jay R. Smith as Jay
- Harry Spear as Harry
- Pete the Pup as himself

=== Additional cast ===
- Anita Garvin as Mother
- Charles A. Bachman as Cop
- Edgar Dearing as Police captain

== See also ==
- Our Gang filmography
