= The Holy Terror (1929 film) =

1929 film

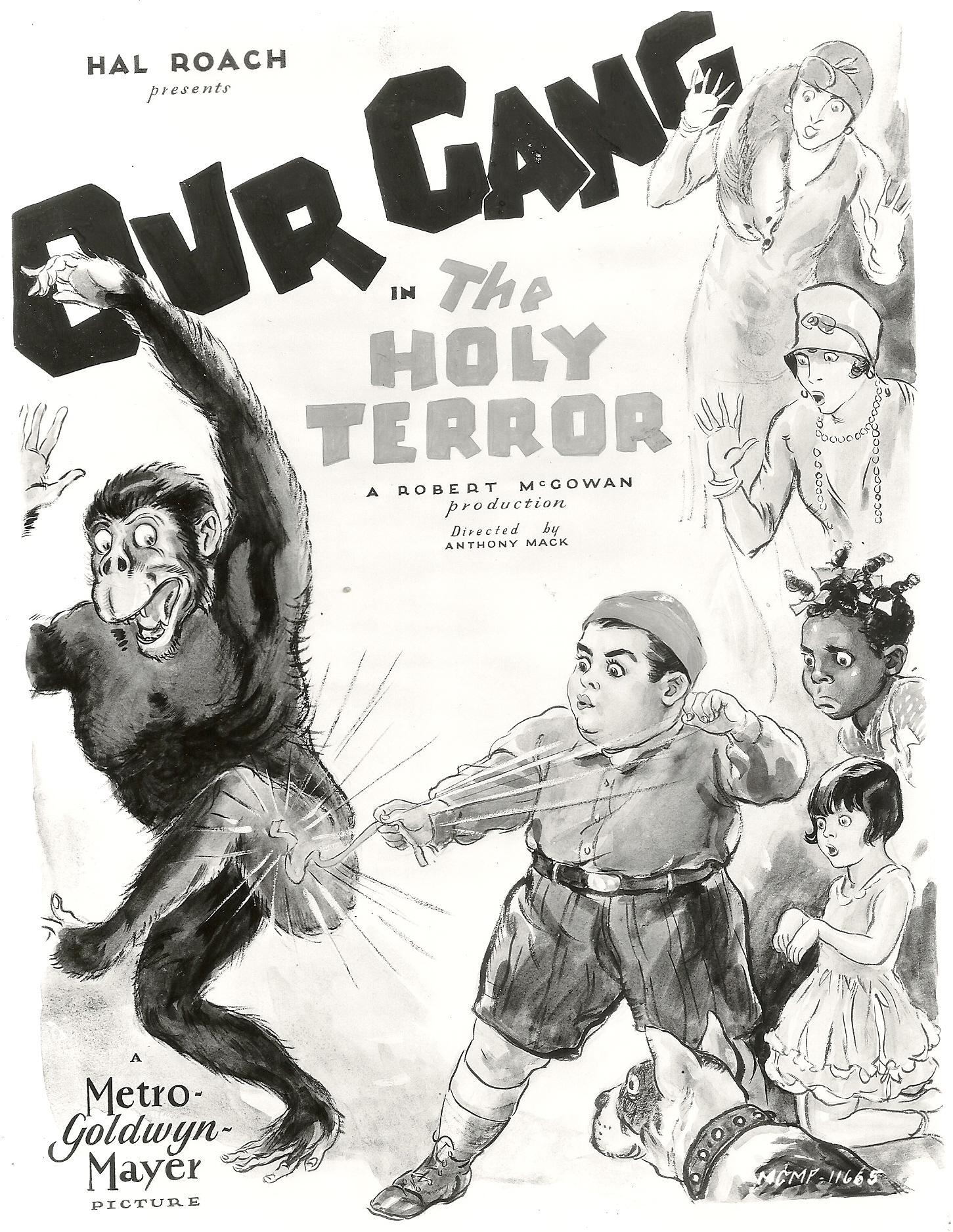
- Directed by: Anthony Mack
- Written by: H. M. Walker
- Produced by: Robert F. McGowan; Hal Roach
- Starring: Mary Ann Jackson; Joe Cobb; Jean Darling; Allen Hoskins; Bobby Hutchins; Harry Spear; Pete the Pup
- Cinematography: Art Lloyd
- Edited by: Richard C. Currier
- Distributed by: Metro-Goldwyn-Mayer
- Release date: March 9, 1929
- Running time: 20 minutes
- Country: United States
- Languages: Silent; English intertitles

The Holy Terror is a lost 1929 Our Gang short silent comedy film, the 83rd in the series, directed by Anthony Mack. It is considered to have been lost, as the film was destroyed in the 1965 MGM vault fire.

== Cast ==
=== The Gang ===
- Mary Ann Jackson as Mary Ann
- Joe Cobb as Joe Cobb
- Jean Darling as Jean
- Allen Hoskins as Farina
- Bobby Hutchins as Wheezer
- Harry Spear as Harry
- Pete the Pup as himself

== See also ==
- Our Gang filmography
