= Tired Business Men =

1927 film

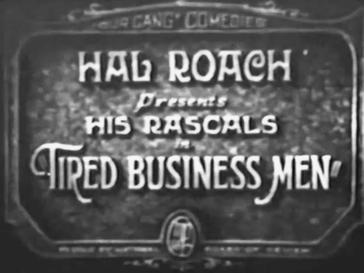
- Title card
- Directed by: Anthony Mack; Charles Oelze
- Written by: Hal Roach; H. M. Walker
- Produced by: Hal Roach
- Starring: Joe Cobb; Jackie Condon; Jean Darling; Allen Hoskins; Jannie Hoskins; Scooter Lowry; Jay R. Smith; Bobby Young; Peggy Eames; Bobby Mallon; Johnny Aber; Jimsy Boudwin; Andy Shuford; Pal the Dog; Charles A. Bachman
- Distributed by: Pathé Exchange
- Release date: May 15, 1927
- Running time: 20 minutes
- Country: United States
- Languages: Silent; English intertitles

Tired Business Men is a 1927 American short silent comedy film, the 60th in the Our Gang series, directed by Anthony Mack.

== Cast ==
=== The Gang ===
- Joe Cobb as Joe O'Farrell
- Jackie Condon as Jackie
- Jean Darling as Bossy
- Allen Hoskins as Farina
- Jannie Hoskins as Mango
- Scooter Lowry as Skooter
- Jay R. Smith as Jay
- Bobby Young as Bonedust
- Peggy Eames as Peggy
- Bobby Mallon as Bobby
- Johnny Aber as Our Gang member
- Jimsy Boudwin as Our Gang member
- Andy Shuford as Our Gang member
- Pal the Dog as himself

=== Additional cast ===
- Charles A. Bachman as Officer O'Farrell
- Ruth Robinson as Joe's mother
- S. D. Wilcox as Officer
- Billy Butts as Undetermined role

== See also ==
- Our Gang filmography
