= The Glorious Fourth (film) =

1927 film

- Directed by: Robert F. McGowan
- Written by: Hal Roach; H. M. Walker
- Produced by: Hal Roach
- Edited by: Richard C. Currier
- Distributed by: Pathé Exchange
- Release date: June 26, 1927
- Running time: 20 minutes
- Country: United States
- Languages: Silent; English intertitles

The Glorious Fourth is a 1927 American short silent comedy film, the 62nd in the Our Gang series, directed by Robert F. McGowan.

== Cast ==
=== The Gang ===
- Joe Cobb - Joe
- Jackie Condon - Jackie
- Allen Hoskins - Farina
- Jannie Hoskins - Mango
- Jay R. Smith - Jay
- Harry Spear - Harry
- Pete the Pup - Pansy

=== Additional cast ===
- Jack Hanlon as Boy with quarter
- Harry Arras - Local resident
- Charles A. Bachman - Officer
- Harry Bowen as Pedestrian
- Charley Chase - Top Hat inebriate
- William Courtright - Cement worker
- June Gittleson as Joe's mother
- Al Hallett - Local resident
- Jack Hill - Man with monocle
- Charles Meakin - Local resident
- Arthur Millett - Local resident
- William A. Orlamond as Scientist
- Dorothy Vernon - Friend of Joe's mother

== See also ==
- Our Gang filmography
