= No Noise =

1923 film

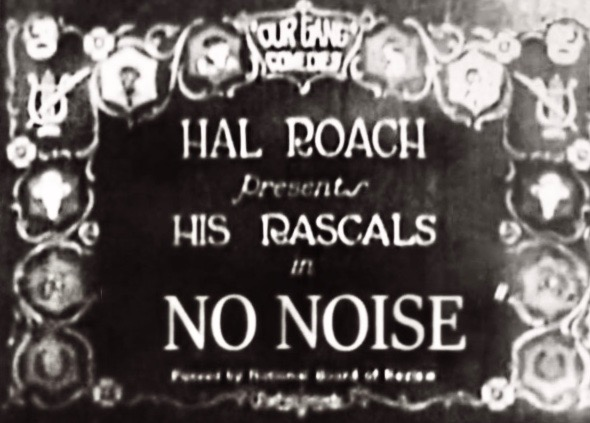
- Directed by: Robert F. McGowan
- Written by: Hal Roach; H. M. Walker
- Produced by: Hal Roach
- Starring: Joe Cobb; Jackie Condon; Mickey Daniels; Allen Hoskins; Mary Kornman; Ernie Morrison
- Distributed by: Pathé Exchange
- Release date: September 23, 1923
- Running time: 20 minutes
- Country: United States
- Languages: Silent film English intertitles

No Noise is the 17th entry in the Our Gang short subject comedy series. The Our Gang series (later known as "The Little Rascals") was created by Hal Roach in 1922, and continued production until 1944.

== Plot ==
Mickey is in the hospital to have his tonsils removed. The gang decide to visit him, and end up causing all sorts of disasters. They manage to work their way into both the x-ray and operating rooms, and become subdued after inhaling some powerful laughing gas. The kids want to get in on the free ice cream given to patients getting their tonsils removed, and decide to switch places with some boys headed to the hospital. But the doctors catch onto the gang's scheme, and a chase through the hospital ensues.

== Notes ==
When the television rights for the original silent Pathé Our Gang comedies were sold to National Telepix and other distributors, several episodes were retitled. This film was released into TV syndication as Mischief Makers in 1960 under the title "Operation Tonsils". About two-thirds of the original film was included. About two minutes of this film was edited with a film from the Hey Fellas! (a rival Our Gang series) into another Mischief Makers episode under the title "Rival Clinic".

== Cast ==
=== The Gang ===
- Joe Cobb as Joe
- Jackie Condon as Jackie
- Mickey Daniels as Mickey
- Jack Davis as Jack
- Allen Hoskins as Farina
- Mary Kornman as Mary
- Ernie Morrison as Ernie
- Dinah the Mule as Herself

=== Additional cast ===
- Andy Samuel as Lewis De Vore, hospital patient
- Charles A. Bachman as Officer
- Beth Darlington as Mickey's Nurse
- Helen Gilmore as Nurse
- Clara Guiol as Nurse
- Lincoln Stedman as Doctor
- Charles Stevenson as Doctor
- Charley Young as Doctor
