= Derby Day =

Derby Day may refer to:

== Sport ==
- The date on which a derby horse race takes place
- An informal, usually local term for the date of a derby match, a competition between rival teams

== Arts ==
- Derby Day (1923 film), Our Gang short
- Derby Day (1952 film), a British drama film directed by Herbert Wilcox
- Derby Day (light opera), a 1931 light opera
- The Derby Day, an 1858 painting by William Powell Frith
