= Fast Freight =

Fast Freight may refer to:

- Fast Freight (film), a 1929 Our Gang short
- The Fast Freight, a 1921 film starring Fatty Arbuckle
