= Mary, Queen of Tots =

1925 film

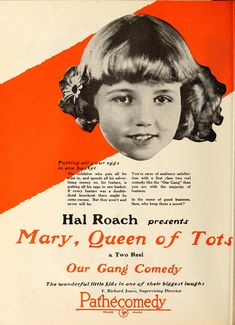
- Print ad for Mary, Queen of Tots
- Directed by: Robert F. McGowan
- Written by: Hal Roach; H. M. Walker
- Produced by: Hal Roach; F. Richard Jones
- Starring: Mary Kornman; Joe Cobb; Jackie Condon; Allen Hoskins; Mickey Daniels; Pal the Dog; Charles A. Bachman; May Beatty; Richard Daniels; James Finlayson; Helen Gilmore; Lyle Tayo; Charley Young
- Cinematography: Art Lloyd
- Edited by: Richard Currier
- Distributed by: Pathé Exchange
- Release date: August 23, 1925
- Running time: 19:51
- Country: United States
- Language: Silent with English intertitles

Mary, Queen of Tots is a 1925 American short silent comedy film, the 42nd in the Our Gang series, directed by Robert F. McGowan.

== Cast ==
=== The Gang ===
- Joe Cobb – Joe
- Jackie Condon – Jackie
- Mickey Daniels – Mickey
- Allen Hoskins – Farina
- Mary Kornman – Mary
- Pal the Dog – Himself

=== Additional cast ===
- Charles A. Bachman – police officer
- Fay Holderness – Governess
- Richard Daniels – gardener
- James Finlayson – 2nd radio station actor
- Harry Lorraine (American actor) – 1st radio station actor
- Helen Gilmore – dollmaker's wife
- Lyle Tayo – Mrs. Newman, Mary's mother
- Charley Young – dollmaker
