= Monkey Business (1926 film) =

1926 film

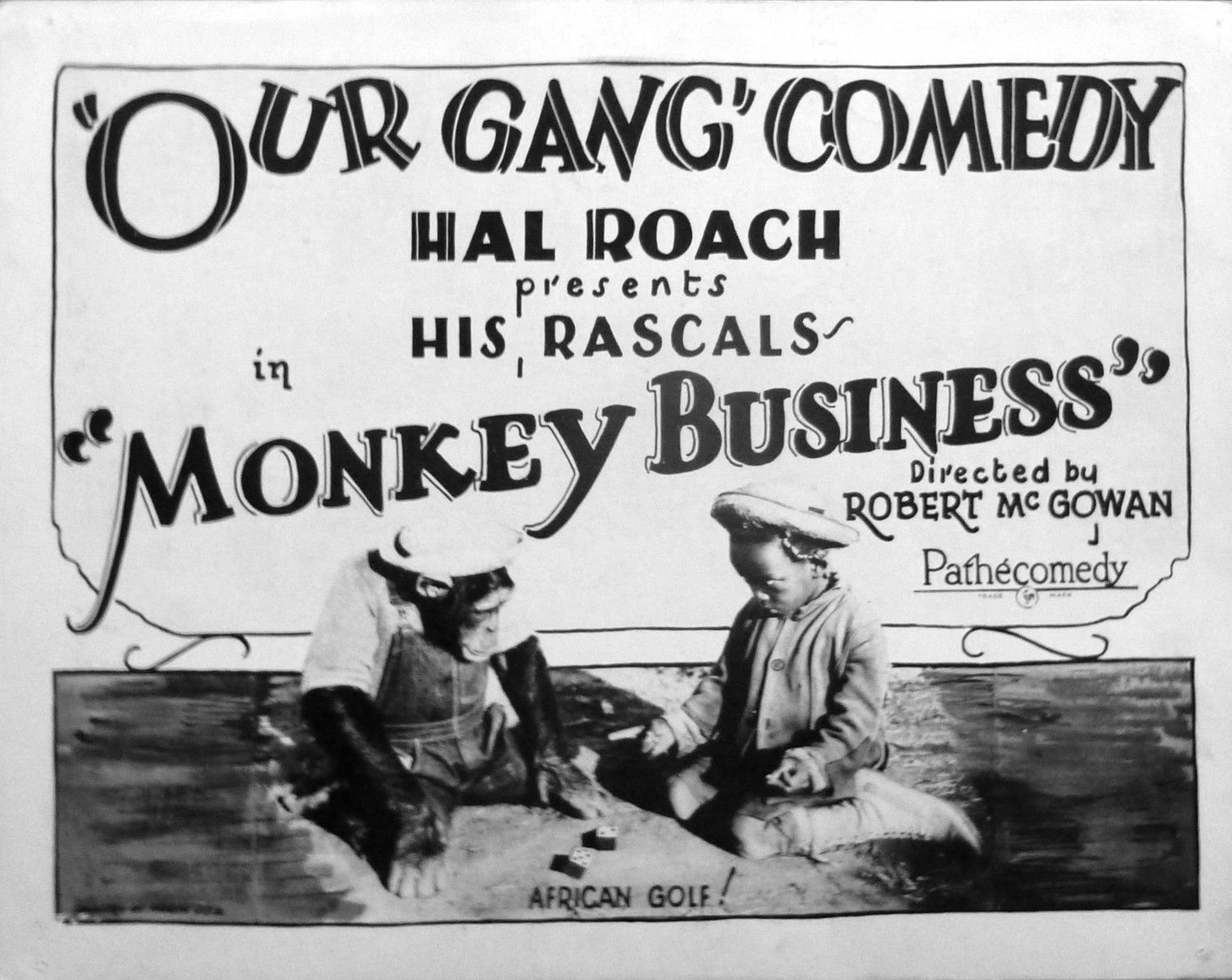
- Lobby card
- Directed by: Robert F. McGowan
- Written by: Hal Roach; H. M. Walker
- Produced by: Hal Roach; F. Richard Jones
- Starring: Joe Cobb; Jackie Condon; Mickey Daniels
- Edited by: Richard C. Currier
- Distributed by: Pathé Exchange
- Release date: March 26, 1926
- Running time: 20 minutes
- Country: United States
- Language: Silent (English intertitles)

Monkey Business

Monkey Business is a 1926 American short silent comedy film, the 48th in the Our Gang series, directed by Robert F. McGowan.

== Cast ==
=== The Gang ===
- Joe Cobb as Joe
- Jackie Condon as Jackie
- Mickey Daniels as Mickey
- Johnny Downs as Johnny
- Allen Hoskins as Farina
- Mary Kornman as Mary
- Jay R. Smith as Jay
- Pal the dog as himself

=== Additional cast ===
- Jannie Hoskins as Mango
- Charles A. Bachman as Officer
- Harry Bowen as man repairing auto
- Ed Brandenburg as Patrol wagon driver
- William Gillespie as Officer
- Charlie Hall as Balloons vendor
- Anthony Mack as First officer

== See also ==
- Our Gang filmography
