= A Pleasant Journey =

1923 film

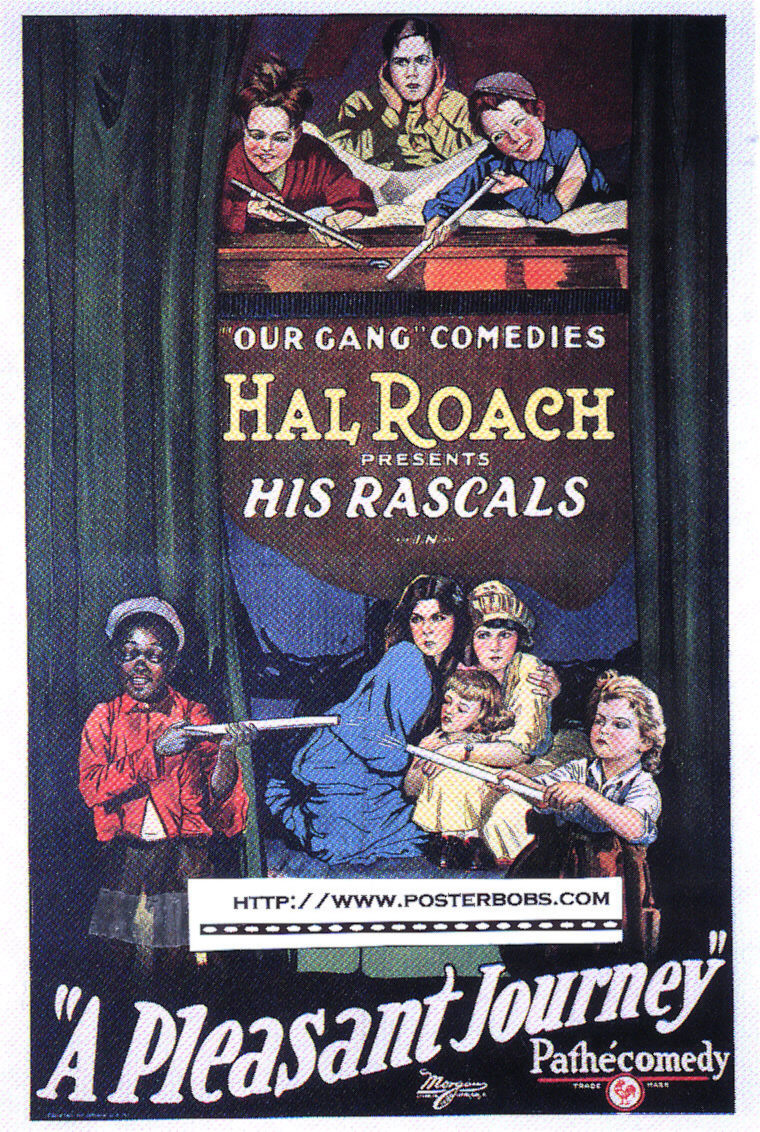
- Directed by: Robert F. McGowan
- Written by: Hal Roach; H. M. Walker; Tom McNamara
- Produced by: Hal Roach
- Starring: Jackie Condon; Mickey Daniels; Jack Davis; Allen Hoskins; Ernie Morrison; Mary Kornman; Joe Cobb; Charles A. Bachman; Roy Brooks; Louise Cabo; William Gillespie; Sam Lufkin; Charles Stevenson
- Distributed by: Pathé
- Release date: March 25, 1923
- Running time: 20 minutes
- Country: United States
- Languages: Silent film English intertitles

A Pleasant Journey is a 1923 silent short comedy film and the tenth Our Gang short subject comedy to be released. The Our Gang series (later known as "The Little Rascals") was created by Hal Roach in 1922, and continued production until 1944.

== Plot ==
The gang decides to switch places with a group of runaway boys who are supposed to be taken by train back to San Francisco. While aboard the train, the gang wreaks havoc for the other passengers. Jackie rescues his dog, T-Bone, from the baggage compartment and this causes considerable disturbance with the conductor. He later changes clothes with a little girl, and they both get spankings by the adults. A traveling salesman volunteers to entertain the children with his noisemakers and fireworks. The gang then parade up and down the train with whistles and kazoos. They set off the fireworks, release sneezing powder, pass around other practical jokes and mayhem results. When they finally arrive at San Francisco, the child care worker receives a telegram informing him that he has the wrong children and must take them back.

== Production notes ==
A Pleasant Journey was remade in 1932 as Choo-Choo!.

== Cast ==
=== The Gang ===
- Jackie Condon — Jackie
- Mickey Daniels — Mickey
- Jack Davis — Jack
- Allen Hoskins — Farina
- Ernie Morrison — Ernie
- Mary Kornman — Mary
- Joe Cobb — Joe

=== Additional cast ===
- Elmo Billings — runaway orphan
- Doris Oelze — baby
- Gabe Saienz — runaway orphan
- Tommy Tucker — fat kid
- George "Freckles" Warde — boy throwing apples
- Charles A. Bachman — police sergeant
- Roy Brooks — chief of police
- Louise Cabo — mother
- William Gillespie — Tilford Gillespie
- Wallace Howe — welfare physician/man with gout
- Mark Jones — inebriated novelty salesman
- Sam Lufkin — cab driver
- Joseph Morrison — porter
- Charles Stevenson — conductor/police officer
- Charley Young — conductor
- George B. French — passenger
- Richard Daniels — passenger
- Clara Guiol — passenger
- Robert F. McGowan — man encountering Farina

== See also ==
- Our Gang filmography
