= Bobby Mallon =

American actor (1919–2008)

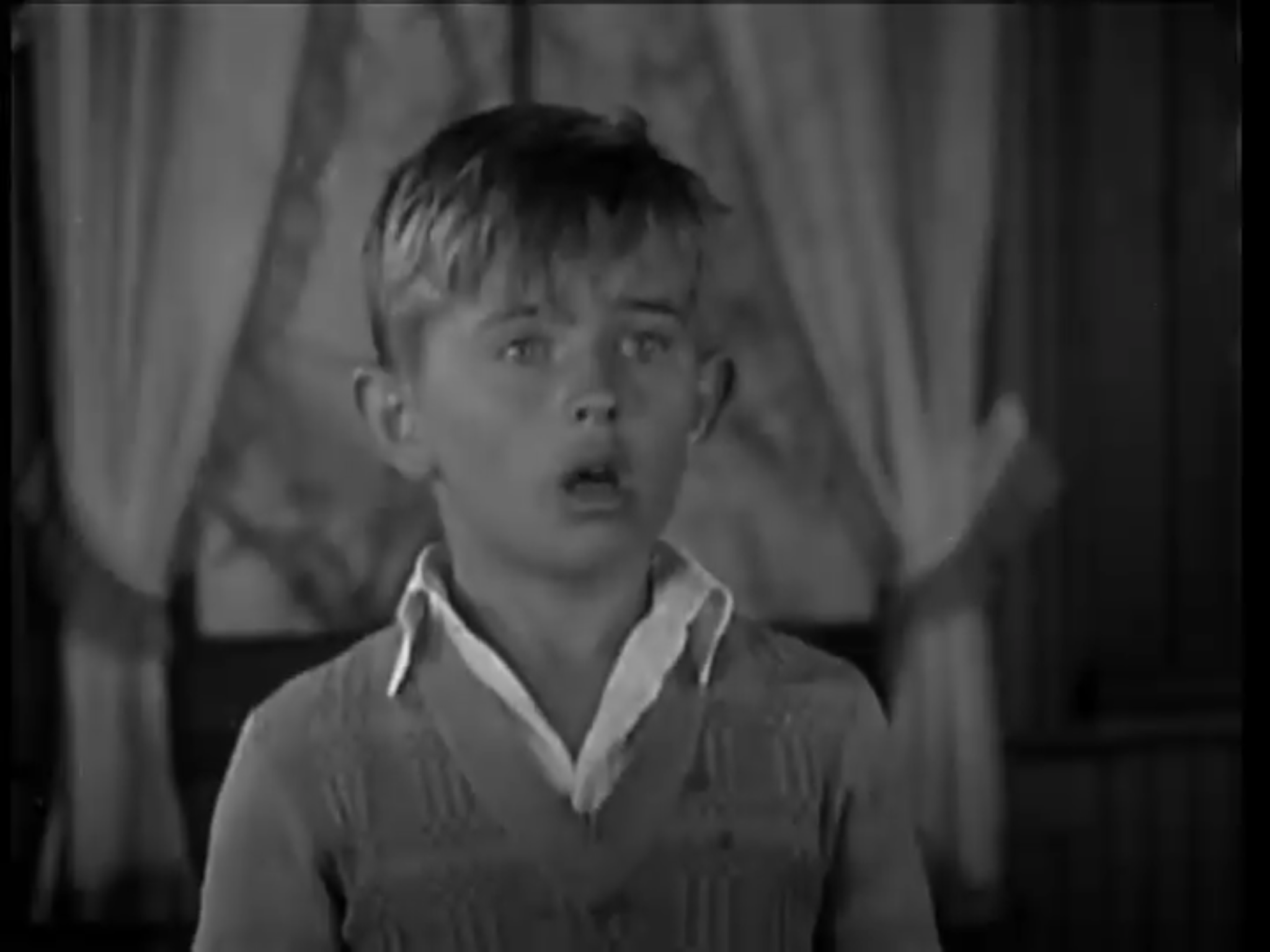
- Mallon in School's Out
- Born: April 7, 1919; Greybull, Wyoming, United States
- Died: September 10, 2008 (aged 89); Los Angeles, California, United States
- Occupation: Child actor
- Years active: 1927–1932

Robert Howard Mallon (April 7, 1919—September 10, 2008) was an American child actor, known for appearing in Hal Roach Studios films, notably Our Gang, as Bobby.

== Early life ==
He was born in Greybull, Wyoming. His father was a fireman killed in a wreck at Cole Creek Wyoming in Sept 1923 as the on train #30.

== Career ==
Mallon was known for playing Bobby in 13 of the Our Gang/Little Rascals series of movies produced by Hal Roach. He also appeared in The Boy Friends in the episode Blood and Thunder as a rehearsal kid.

He left show business after being "retired" from the Gang in 1932.

== Death ==
He died on September 10, 2008, in Los Angeles, California, and was one of the last surviving members of the famed Little Rascals series at the time of his death.

He is buried at the Mount Sinai Simi Valley Cemetery in Simi Valley, California.

== Filmography ==
- Love My Dog (1926)
- Tired Business Men (1927)
- Chicken Feed (1927)
- Boxing Gloves (1929)
- Bouncing Babies (1929)
- Moan & Groan, Inc. (1929)
- Shivering Shakespeare (1929)
- Teacher's Pet (1930)
- School's Out (1930)
- Blood and Thunder (1931)
- Spanky (1932)
- Free Wheeling (1932)
- Birthday Blues (1932)
