= Derby Day (1923 film) =

1923 film

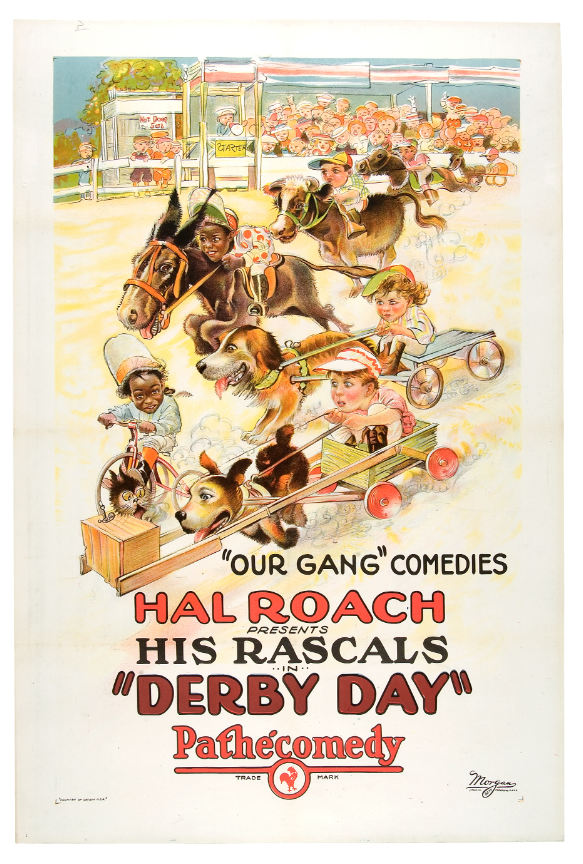
- Directed by: Robert F. McGowan
- Written by: Hal Roach; H. M. Walker
- Produced by: Hal Roach
- Starring: Joe Cobb; Jackie Condon; Mickey Daniels; Jack Davis; Allen Hoskins; Mary Kornman; Ernest Morrison; Sonny Loy; Dinah the Mule; Charles A. Bachman; Richard Daniels; William Gillespie; Wallace Howe
- Music by: Brian Benison
- Distributed by: Pathé Exchange
- Release date: November 18, 1923
- Running time: 26:51
- Country: United States
- Languages: Silent; English intertitles

Derby Day is a 1923 short silent comedy film directed by Robert F. McGowan. It was the 19th Our Gang short subject to be released.

== Plot ==
As the gang are selling lemonade across the street from the racetrack, they meet up with Mary, whose rich father owns one of the horses. She gets them into the track, and they are sufficiently impressed to start up their own junior version.

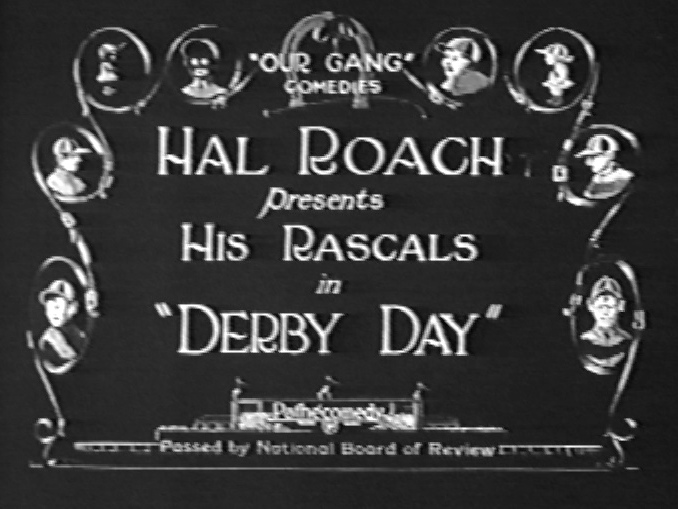
Title card for Derby Day

== Critical reception ==
Upon its original 1923 release, Derby Day was well received by critics. Motion Picture News reviewer Roger Ferri commented, "Hal Roach's company of clever juvenile comedians makes Zev, Morich, and Man o' War look like 'also rans' in Derby Day, about the funniest thing this mob has done for cinematographic entertainment. With the air topped with turf gossip this travesty on horse racing comes at an opportune time. . . . For originality, Derby Day can't be beat—you can't touch it. It's in a class by itself. . . . [A] description of the theme does the comedy no justice—it's got to be seen, and once your audience see it they won't forget it."

== Production notes ==
When the television rights for the original silent Pathé Our Gang comedies were sold to National Telepix and other distributors, several episodes were retitled. This film was released into television syndication as "Mischief Makers" in 1960 under the title Little Jockeys. Two-thirds of the original film was included. Derby Day was the last Our Gang comedy for Jack Davis.

The Film Detective streaming site has a different title card, which is indicating the title of the film as Derby Days.

== Cast ==
=== The Gang ===
- Joe Cobb — Joe
- Jackie Condon — Jackie
- Mickey Daniels — Mickey
- Jack Davis — Jack
- Allen Hoskins — Farina
- Mary Kornman — Mary
- Ernest Morrison — Sunshine Sammy
- Sonny Loy — Sing Joy
- Dinah the Mule — Herself

=== Additional cast ===
- Charles A. Bachman — police officer
- Richard Daniels — trainer
- William Gillespie — Mary's father
- Wallace Howe — gate attendant
