= The Champeen =

1923 film

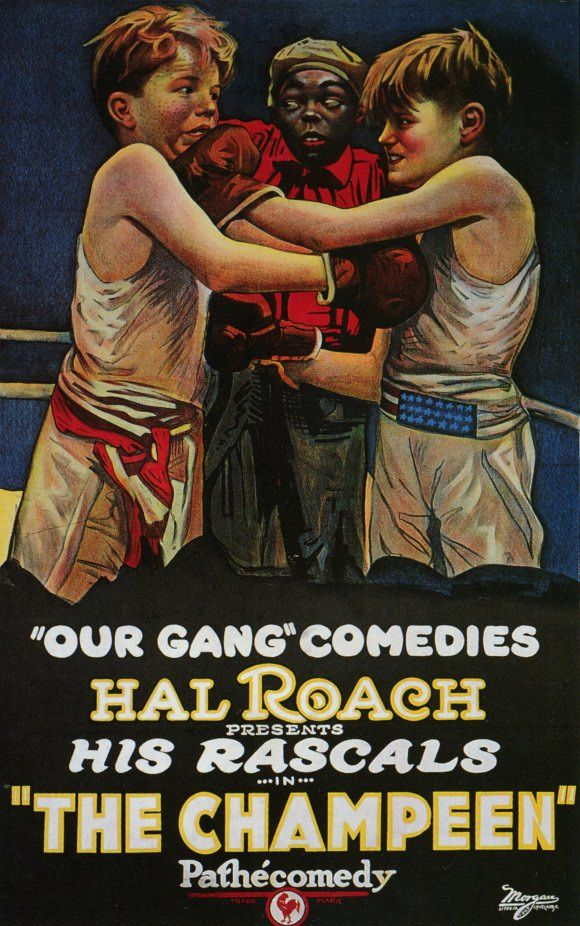
- Directed by: Robert F. McGowan
- Written by: Hal Roach; H. M. Walker
- Produced by: Hal Roach
- Starring: Joe Cobb; Jackie Condon; Mickey Daniels; Jack Davis; Johnny Downs; Allen Hoskins; Mary Kornman; Ernie Morrison.
- Cinematography: Len Powers
- Production company: Hal Roach Studios
- Distributed by: Pathé Exchange
- Release date: January 28, 1923
- Running time: 20 minutes
- Country: United States
- Languages: Silent film English intertitles

The Champeen is the seventh Our Gang short subject comedy to be released. The Our Gang series (later known as "The Little Rascals") was created by Hal Roach in 1922, and continued production until 1944.

== Plot ==
After getting caught for stealing apples, Sammy starts to promote boxing matches to pay back the grocer. Mickey and Jack challenge each other in a match, with each hoping to gain the affection of Mary Kornman.

== Notes ==
When the television rights for the original silent Pathé Our Gang comedies were sold to National Telepix and other distributors, several episodes were retitled. This film was released into TV syndication as Mischief Makers in 1960 under the title "Big Fight". About two-thirds of the original film was included. The scene where Mickey and Tuffy race to get sodas for Mary was included in the hybrid Mischief Makers episode "Play Ball!". This short was remade, as a part-talking film, Boxing Gloves, in 1929, with Joe Cobb and Chubby Chaney fighting over the affections of Jean Darling, and Farina as the promoter and referee.

== Cast ==
=== The Gang ===
- Jackie Condon as Jackie
- Mickey Daniels as Mickey
- Jack Davis as Jackie 'Tuffy'
- Ernie Morrison as Sammy
- Mary Kornman as Mary
- Allen Hoskins as Farina
- Richard Billings as Tuffy's first trainer
- Dorothy Morrison as Farina's opponent
- Gabe Saienz as Komp
- Andy Samuel as Mickey's second trainer
- George "Freckles" Warde as Mickey's first trainer
- Dinah the Mule as herself

=== Additional cast ===
- Elmo Billings as Audience member
- Joe Cobb as Audience member
- Sammy Brooks as The green grocer
- Wallace Howe as The smoker
- Charles Stevenson as The police officer

== See also ==
- List of boxing films
