= Charles A. Bachman =

American actor (1882–1966)

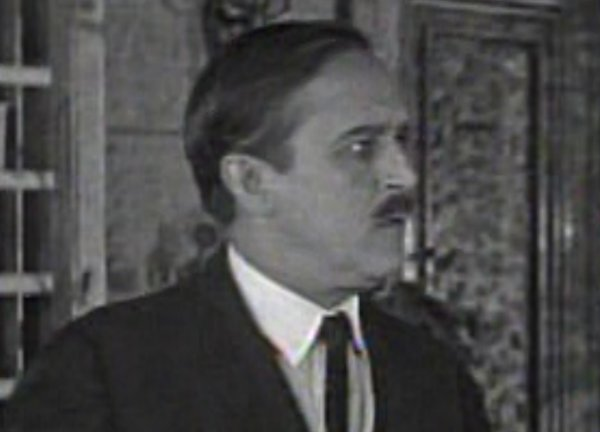
- Born: July 12, 1882; Wheeling, West Virginia
- Died: May 14, 1966 (aged 83); Los Angeles, California
- Other names: C.A. Bachman; Charles Bachman
- Occupation: film actor
- Years active: 1923–1940

Charles A. Bachman (July 12, 1882 - May 14, 1966), born Chester Arthur Bachman, was an American film comedy actor. He appeared in 29 films between 1923 and 1940 for the Hal Roach Studio, primarily in Our Gang shorts and Laurel and Hardy comedies.

== Filmography ==
Year	Title	Role	Notes
1923	A Pleasant Journey	Police Sergeant	Short
1923	No Noise	Officer	Short
1923	Derby Day	Trumpeter	Short
1924	High Society	Police detective	Short
1924	The Mysterious Mystery!	Det. Jinks (mistaken 'suspeck')	Short
1925	Boys Will Be Joys	Jim, the surveyor	Short
1925	Mary, Queen of Tots	Officer	Short
1926	Monkey Business	Officer	Short
1926	The Fourth Alarm	Officer	Short
1927	Tired Business Men	Officer O'Farrell	Short
1927	The Glorious Fourth	Officer	Short
1927	Heebee Jeebees	Officer	Short
1927	Do Detectives Think?	Officer	Short, Uncredited
1927	Putting Pants on Philip	Officer	Short
1927	Dog Heaven	Officer	Short
1927	The Second Hundred Years		Short
1928	The Circus	Cop	Uncredited
1928	Spook Spoofing	Officer	Short
1928	Crazy House	Officer	Short
1928	Old Gray Hoss	Officer Mulligan	Short
1928	Habeas Corpus	2nd Policeman	Short, Uncredited
1929	Fancy Baggage		
1929	Modern Love	Policeman in the rain	Uncredited
1931	Pardon Us	Insurgent Convict	Uncredited
1931	The Mad Genius	Poster Hanger	Uncredited
1932	Pack Up Your Troubles	Policeman	Uncredited
1934	Girl in Danger	Night Watchman	Uncredited
1935	The Whole Town's Talking	Policeman	Uncredited
1935	Men of the Hour	Policeman	Uncredited
1936	Our Relations	Police Officer	Uncredited
1937	Pick a Star	Studio Guard	Uncredited
1939	They All Come Out	Guard	Uncredited
1940	Saps at Sea	Officer	Uncredited, (final film role)
