= Dorothy Morrison (actress) =

American actress (1919–2017)

- Morrison in Isn't Life Terrible? (1925)
- Born: January 3, 1919; Los Angeles, California, U.S.
- Died: October 18, 2017 (aged 98)
- Occupation: Actress
- Years active: 1922–1935

Dorothy Morrison (January 3, 1919 – October 18, 2017), later taking the married name Dorothy Morrison Green, was an American stage and screen actress who as a child actress appeared in a few of the Hal Roach created Our Gang short subject films during the silent era. Her older brother, Ernie Morrison (billed as Sunshine Sammy), also acted in this film series.
