= Art Lloyd =

American cameraman and cinematographer (1897–1954)

- Born: Arthur Raymond Lloyd; October 17, 1897; Los Angeles, California, U.S.
- Died: November 25, 1954 (aged 57); Los Angeles, California, U.S.
- Occupations: Cinematographer and cameraman
- Spouse: Venice Jepperson (m. 1928)

Arthur Raymond Lloyd (October 17, 1897 – November 25, 1954) was an American cameraman and cinematographer who worked for Hal Roach Studios and filmed many of the Laurel and Hardy and Our Gang comedies.

== Early life ==
Arthur Raymond Lloyd was born on October 17, 1897, in Los Angeles, California.

== Career ==
Around 1922, Lloyd joined Hal Roach Studios. He worked there as a cameraman and cinematographer. He filmed Our Gang comedies. By 1925, he had worked on fifteen films with Hal Roach, including Mary, Queen of Tots.

In 1942, Lloyd was a captain in the United States Army and was an instructor of photography at an army base. He served in the United States Army Signal Corps.

== Personal life ==
Lloyd married Venice Jepperson, daughter of Samuel Jepperson Jr., of Provo, Utah, on January 1, 1928. They lived in Hollywood, Los Angeles.

Lloyd died on November 25, 1954, at his home in Hollywood.
