= Pete the Pup =

Dog actor

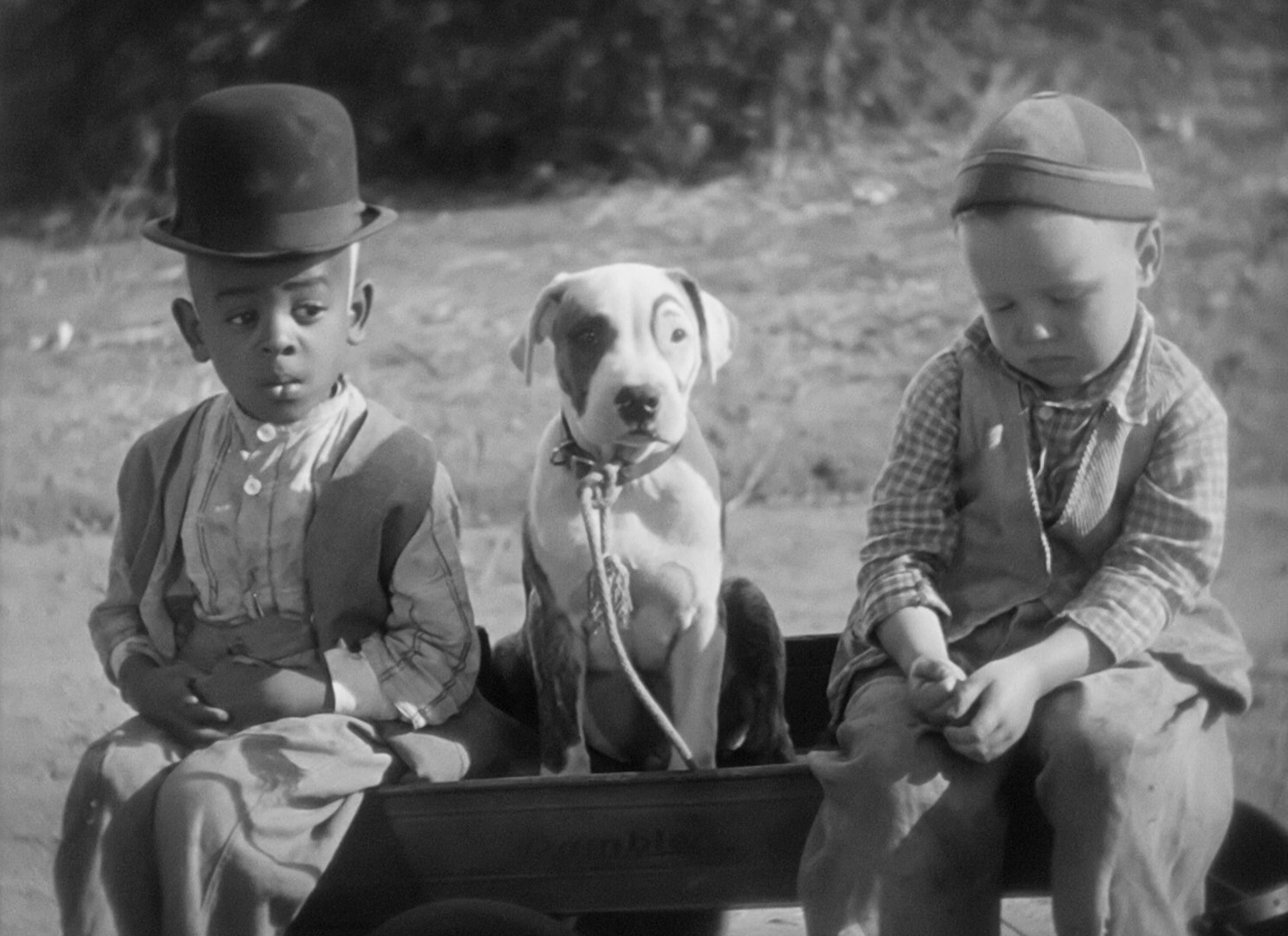
- Pete the Pup with Matthew Beard and Bobby Hutchins in the 1930 comedy film School's Out
- Other names: Petey, Lucenay's Peter
- Species: Canis familiaris
- Breed: American Pit Bull Terrier
- Sex: Male
- Born: September 9, 1929
- Died: January 28, 1946
- Nationality: United States
- Occupation: Actor
- Years active: 1929-1938

Pete the Pup (September 9, 1929 – January 28, 1946) was an American dog actor known to portray "Pete, the dog with the ring around his eye" in Hal Roach's Our Gang comedies series (later known as The Little Rascals) during the 1930s. He was well-known for the circle around his eye, applied by Hollywood makeup artist Max Factor.

== Dog actors ==
=== Pal the Wonder Dog ===
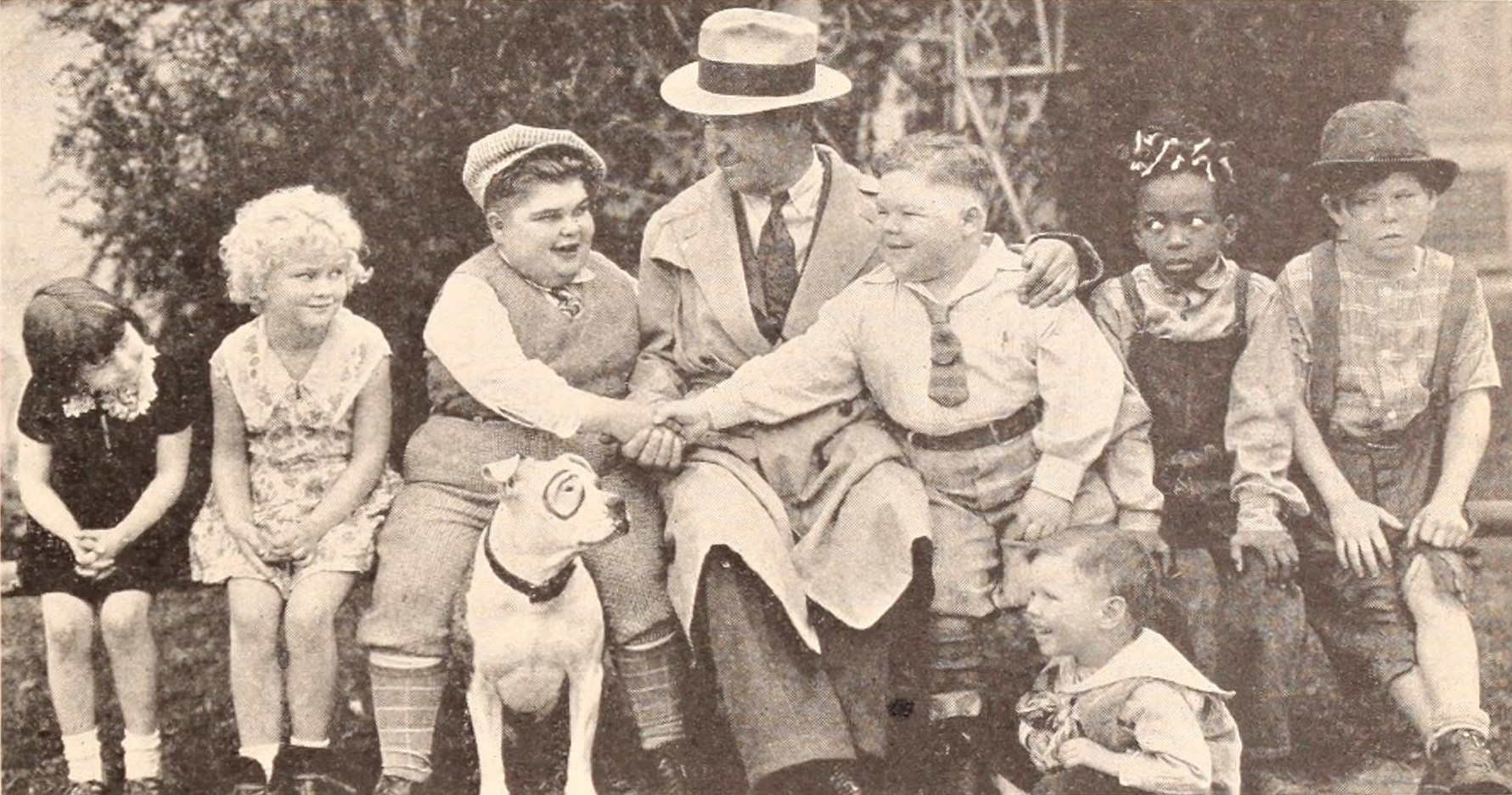
Pal the Wonder Dog as Pete, along with Our Gang cast with director Robert F. McGowan.

The first dog actor to play Pete, in "The Glorious Fourth" (1927), was an UKC registered American Pit Bull Terrier named Pal the Wonder Dog. He was born in 1924 as a descendant to Colby's Pincher, sired by Tudor's Black Jack x Keller Peggy O'Neill and bred by Earl Tudor. According to Our Gang actor Jean Darling, Pal was born with a ring about three-quarters of the way around his right eye and his trainer painted it the rest of the way, later credited as an oddity in Ripley's Believe It or Not. Pal started his career as Tige in the Buster Brown series in the 1920s. When he was about six months old in 1925, Pal appeared in the Harold Lloyd film The Freshman.

Pal was poisoned and died in 1930.

=== Lucenay's Peter (Pete the pup) ===
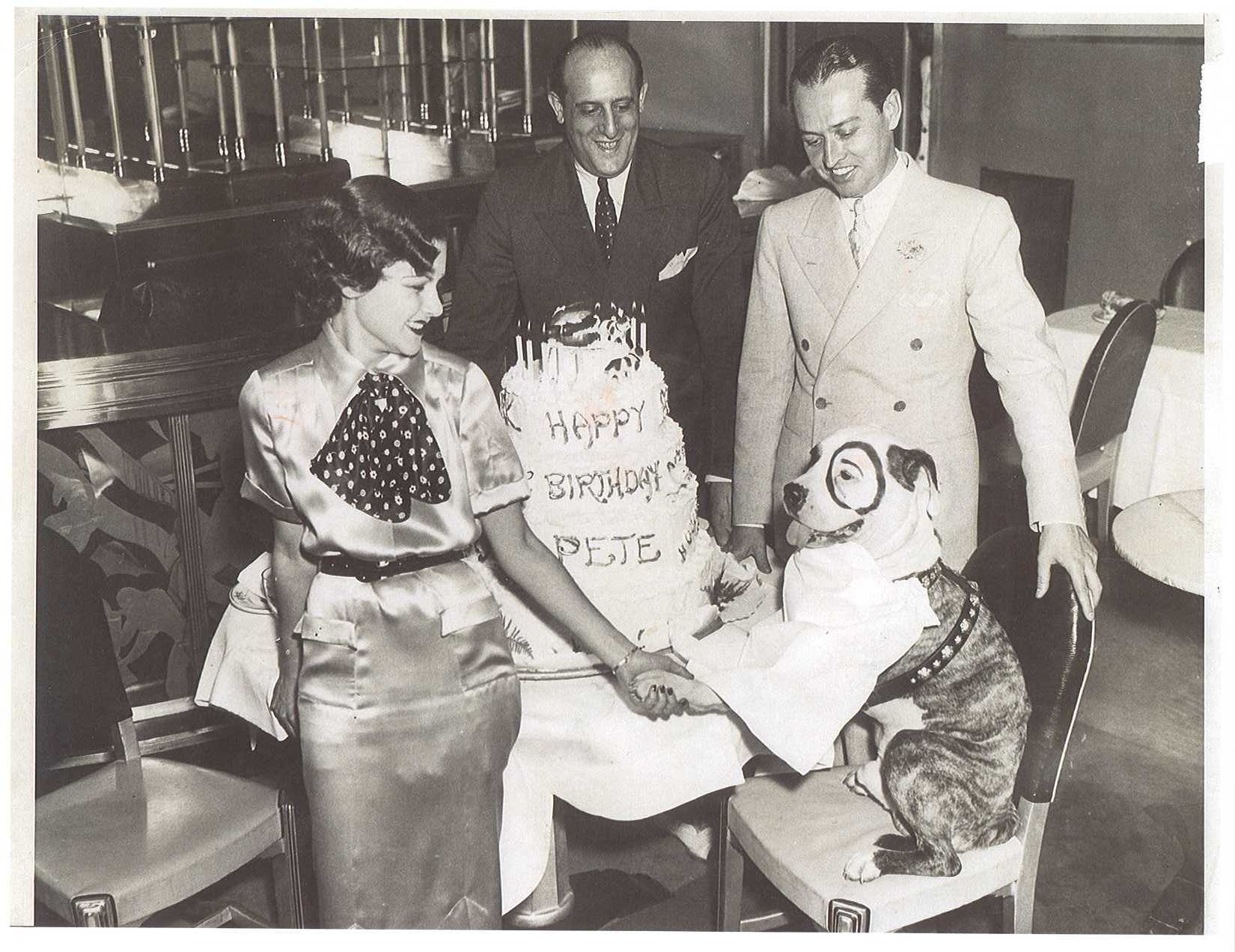
Birthday party for Pete the Pup (Lucenay's Peter)

After Pal's death, his trainer and owner Harry Lucenay used one of Pal's male offspring to play Pete in the series. Pal's son, named Lucenay's Peter (sired by Pal the Wonder Dog x Keller Peggy O'Neill) was a UKC/AKC dual-registered American Pit Bull Terrier/American Staffordshire Terrier, mostly known as Pete the Pup, bred by A. A. Keller and born in 1929. This second Pete was used following Pal's death and strongly resembled the first Pete, but lacking the circle around his left eye, so that it was painted on. Lucenay's Peter first appeared as a puppy in Pups Is Pups and was nearly full-grown in his second appearance in School's Out. The second Pete's last Our Gang appearance was The Pooch in 1932. The plot involves a dog catcher who tries unsuccessfully to catch Pete and euthanize him.

Roach next used a number of unrelated dogs to portray Pete in Our Gang films until 1938, beginning with Hook and Ladder (1932). Lucenay's Peter died of old age on January 28, 1946 in Los Angeles at the age of 16 years and 4 months, two years after the Our Gang series ended. Pete is buried at the Los Angeles Pet Memorial Park in Calabasas, California.

=== Other dog actors ===
In the 1994 feature film remake of the Our Gang comedies, The Little Rascals, Pete is portrayed by an American Bulldog dog actor named Petey.

In its 2014 direct-to-video followup, The Little Rascals Save the Day, Pete is portrayed by Jules, a female mongrel dog actor who participated in a 2014 Shelter Pet Project television commercial.

== See also ==
- List of individual dogs
- List of animal actors
