= Bobby Hutchins =

American child actor (1925–1945)

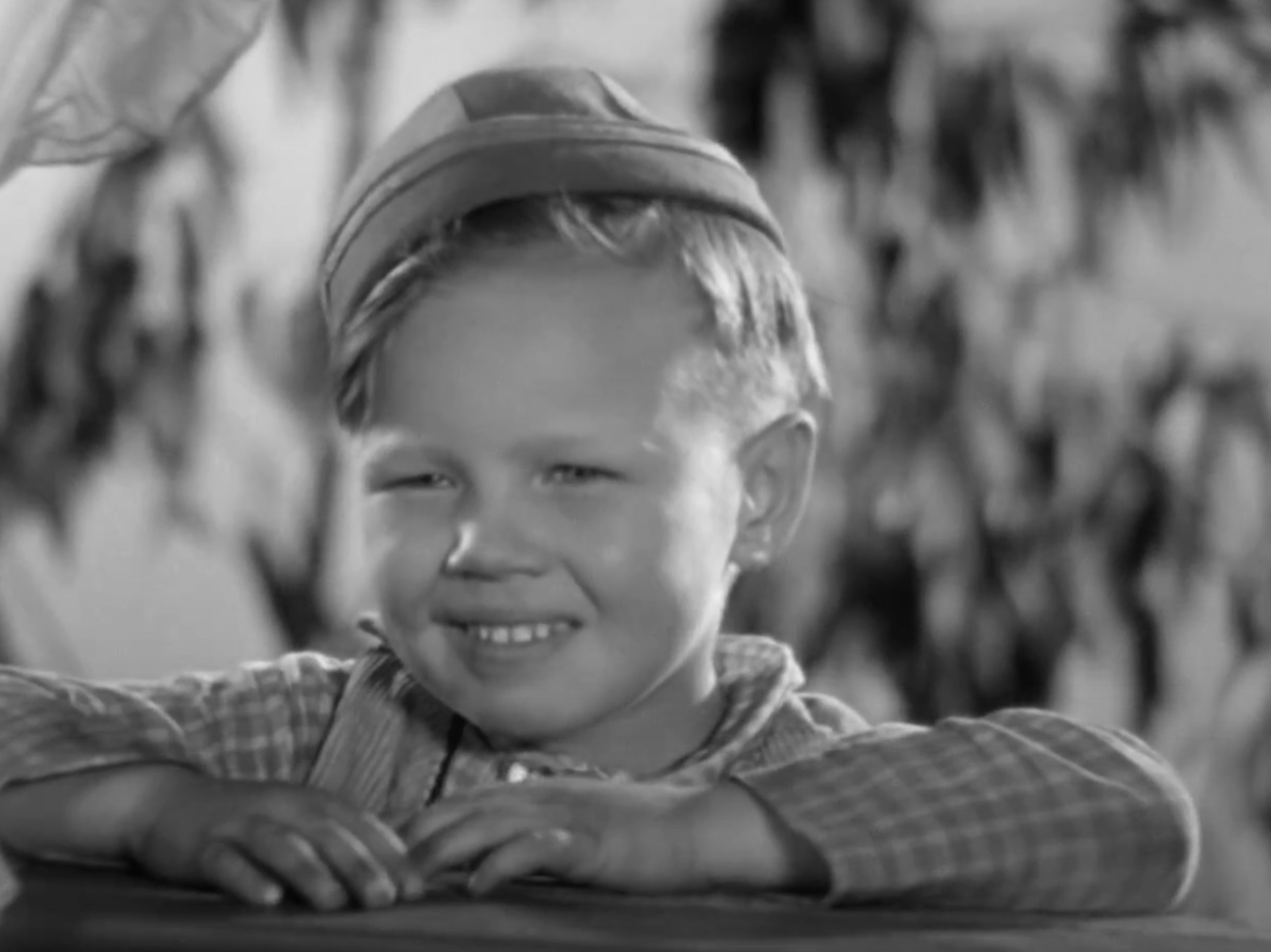
- Hutchins as Wheezer in School's Out (1930)
- Born: Robert E. Hutchins; March 29, 1925; Tacoma, Washington, U.S.
- Died: May 17, 1945 (aged 20); Merced, California, U.S.
- Occupation: Child actor
- Years active: 1927–1933
- Military career
- Allegiance: United States
- Branch: United States Army Air Corps
- Service years: 1943–1945
- Conflicts: World War II

Robert E. Hutchins (March 29, 1925 – May 17, 1945) was an American child actor who was a regular in the Our Gang short subjects series from 1927 to 1933. A native of Tacoma, Washington, he was given the nickname of Wheezer after running around the studios on his first day so much that he began to wheeze.

== Early life ==
Bobby Hutchins was born to James and Olga (Constance) Hutchins in Washington. His father was a native of Kentucky and his mother a native of Washington State.

== Career ==
Wheezer appeared in 58 Our Gang films during his six years in the series. For much of his run, "Wheezer" was portrayed as the perennial tag-along little brother, put off by the older children but always eager to be part of the action.

Hutchins' first film in Our Gang was the 1927 short Baby Brother as the risky character Horatio. Hutchins' tenure in Our Gang took him through both the silent and early sound periods of the series. He appears as the main character of several of the films, including Bouncing Babies, Pups Is Pups, Big Ears, and Dogs Is Dogs. He left the series at the end of the 1932-33 film season after appearing in Mush and Milk; his only film work outside of Our Gang includes a handful of appearances in three outside features in 1932 and 1933. Hutchins was 8 when he left the series in 1933.

Hutchins fell out of favour with producer Hal Roach and chief producer Robert F. McGowan: With the departure of all four regular members of the older "gang" in the series (Jackie Cooper, Allen Hoskins, Norman Chaney, and Mary Ann Jackson) at the end of the 1930-31 season, Hutchins, as hitherto leader of the younger, "shadow" gang (composed of him, Matthew Beard, and Dorothy DeBorba), was poised to become the star of the series, i.e., the gang's on-screen leader. However only three more shorts were produced in the remaining months of 1931, Hutchins was the lead in each, the second was very well received, and the third one, Dogs is Dogs, is regarded as one of the very best shorts of the entire series.

Thereafter, however, Hutchins's role was greatly diminished. In 1932's first short, Readin' and Writin', recently hired Kendall "Breezy Brisbane" McComas took over as the gang's ostensible on-screen leader. In the following episode, George McFarland made his debut as "Spanky", enthralling Roach and McGowan so much that they took the unprecedented step of giving him star billing in a couple subsequent shorts that year. By comparison, Hutchins was now relegated to being a minor member of the gang, receiving very few lines and close-ups. When newcomer Dickie Moore, who was younger than Hutchins, took over as the gang's leader at the start of the 1932–33 season, Hutchins did not appear in the first three episodes.

Other members of the Our Gang troupe remember very little about Hutchins. Jackie Cooper said, "You'd go to play with Wheezer and his father would pull him away. Very competitive. I didn't get a satisfactory answer from my mother or grandmother as to why, but he was to be left alone." Other cast members reported that Hutchins was abused by his parents to keep him from outgrowing Our Gang. Hutchins's younger brother Dickie appeared in the short Forgotten Babies.

== After Our Gang ==
After outgrowing the series, Hutchins and his family eventually moved back to Tacoma, where he entered public school. He joined the U.S. Army Air Forces in 1943 after graduating high school and enrolled in the Aviation Cadet Program with the goal of becoming a pilot.

== Death ==
Hutchins was killed in a mid-air collision on May 17, 1945, while trying to land a North American AT-6D-NT Texan, serial number 42-86536, of the 3026th Base Unit, when it struck an AT-6C-15-NT Texan, 42-49068, of the same unit at Merced Army Air Field in Merced, California, later known as Castle Air Force Base, during a training exercise. The other pilot, Edward F. Hamel, survived. Hutchins's mother, Olga Hagerson Hutchins, had been scheduled to travel to the airfield for his graduation from flying school, which would have occurred the week after he died.

== Legacy ==
The American rock band Weezer adopted the name based on Hutchins' character (albeit a different spelling), which was based on singer Rivers Cuomo's nickname that his father gave him when he was a kid because "[Wheezer] is the cool one."
