= Jean Darling =

American child actress and writer (1922–2015)

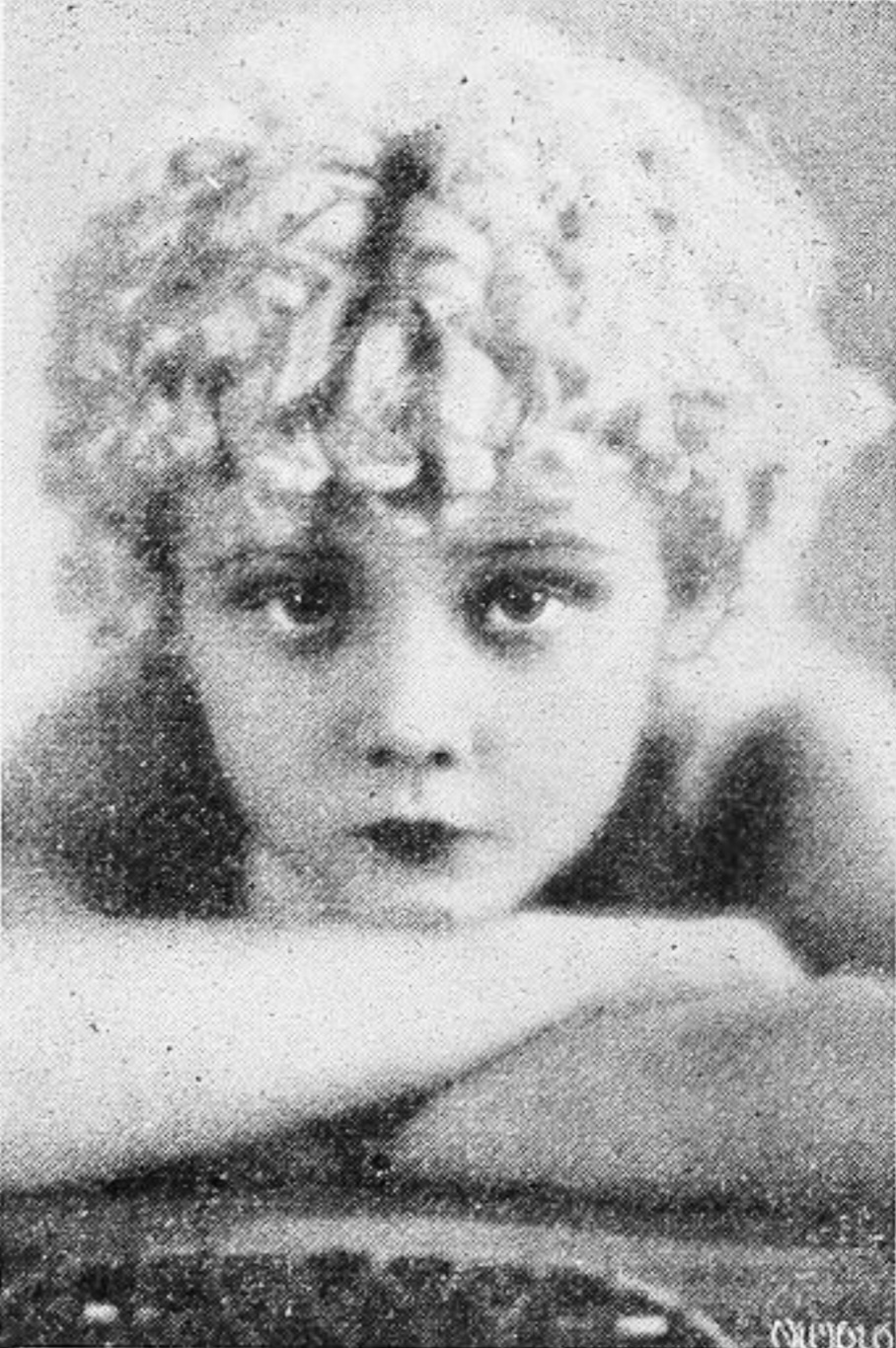
- Darling in the 1920s
- Born: Dorothy Jean LeVake; August 23, 1922; Santa Monica, California, U.S.
- Died: September 4, 2015 (aged 93); Rödermark, Germany
- Occupations: Actress; singer; writer
- Years active: 1923–1967
- Spouse: Reuben Bowen (m. 1954; died 1980)

Jean Darling (born Dorothy Jean LeVake; August 23, 1922 – September 4, 2015) was an American child actress who was a regular in the Our Gang short subjects series from 1927 to 1929. Prior to her death, she was one of four surviving cast members from the silent era cast of Our Gang (Lassie Lou Ahern, Mildred Kornman and Dorothy Morrison being the others). At the time of her death in 2015, Darling was, along with Baby Peggy, one of the last surviving actors who worked in the silent film era.

== Child star ==
Born Dorothy Jean LeVake, her name was legally changed to Jean Darling when she was five months old, a few days after her mother and father separated. She began in movies at six months old as a freelance baby. She got her break in 1926 when she passed a screen test and was accepted for a part in Hal Roach's Our Gang series. Darling appeared in 46 silents and five talkies with Our Gang during this period. She left the series in the fall of 1929 along with Joe Cobb and Harry Spear. She was not replaced right away.

She continued to appear in films after leaving the gang, including an appearance in Laurel & Hardy's adaptation of Babes in Toyland (uncredited) and as the young Jane in Jane Eyre (both 1934). A round of stage and radio shows followed. Stage shows involved up to seven performances a day. It was a punishing schedule for a fourteen-year-old, and that was not taking into account her educational studies.

== Later life and career ==
Darling began to study singing, and in 1940 she was given a scholarship by the New York Municipal Opera Association. She turned down an offer to appear alongside Mickey Rooney in one of the MGM Andy Hardy movies, and went on Broadway, making her debut in the musical Count Me In in 1942. Darling's stage career hit a real high when she landed the role of Carrie Pipperidge in the original Broadway production of Carousel in 1945. She appeared in 850 consecutive performances.

Her role as Carrie Pipperidge helped her with parts for radio and TV in the 1950s. She hosted her own television show for NBC in New York City, A Date with Jean Darling. Her daily TV show for women, The Singing Knit-Witch, was aired on KHJ-TV in Hollywood. Her last work was a humorous silent comedy short, The Butler's Tale, from 2013. Written and directed by her good friend René Riva, a Dutch actor and singer, it was styled after the ones Darling starred in as a child.

In 1974, Darling moved to Dublin, Ireland, where she wrote mystery stories and had over 50 short stories published in the Alfred Hitchcock's Mystery Magazine and Whispers. As "Aunty Poppy", she read stories, which she wrote herself, on RTÉ radio and TV. She also wrote plays for radio and worked as a journalist.

== Personal life ==
Darling married Reuben Bowen and they had a son, Roy. Reuben Bowen died of cancer on August 22, 1980. She never remarried. She later lived with her son in Rodgau, Germany. She died at a nursing home in Rödermark on September 4, 2015, after a sudden illness, aged 93. Her death was reported two days later.
