= Allen Hoskins =

American child actor (1920–1980)

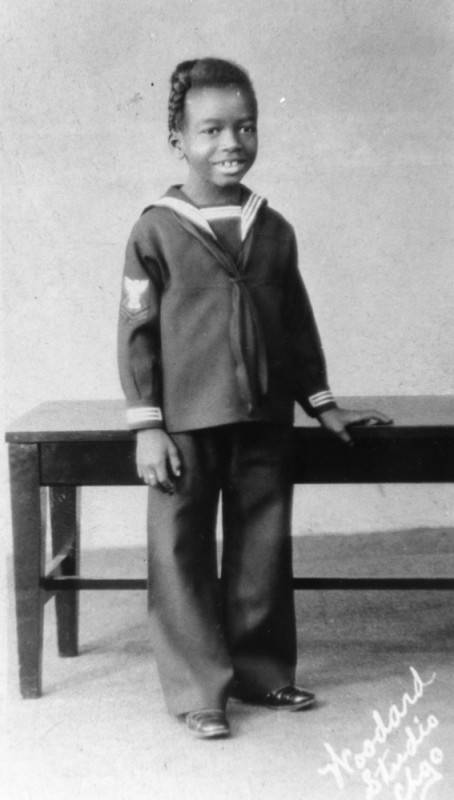
- Hoskins in 1925
- Born: Allen Clayton Hoskins; August 9, 1920; Boston, Massachusetts, U.S.
- Died: July 26, 1980 (aged 59); Oakland, California, U.S.
- Other name: Farina
- Occupation: Actor
- Years active: 1922–1952

Allen Clayton Hoskins (August 9, 1920 – July 26, 1980) was an American child actor, who portrayed the character of Farina in 105 Our Gang short films from 1922 to 1931.

== Acting career 1920–1936 ==
=== Our Gang ===
==== Stardom ====
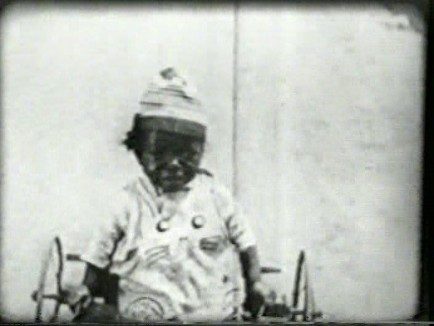
Farina in One Terrible Day, aged 2.

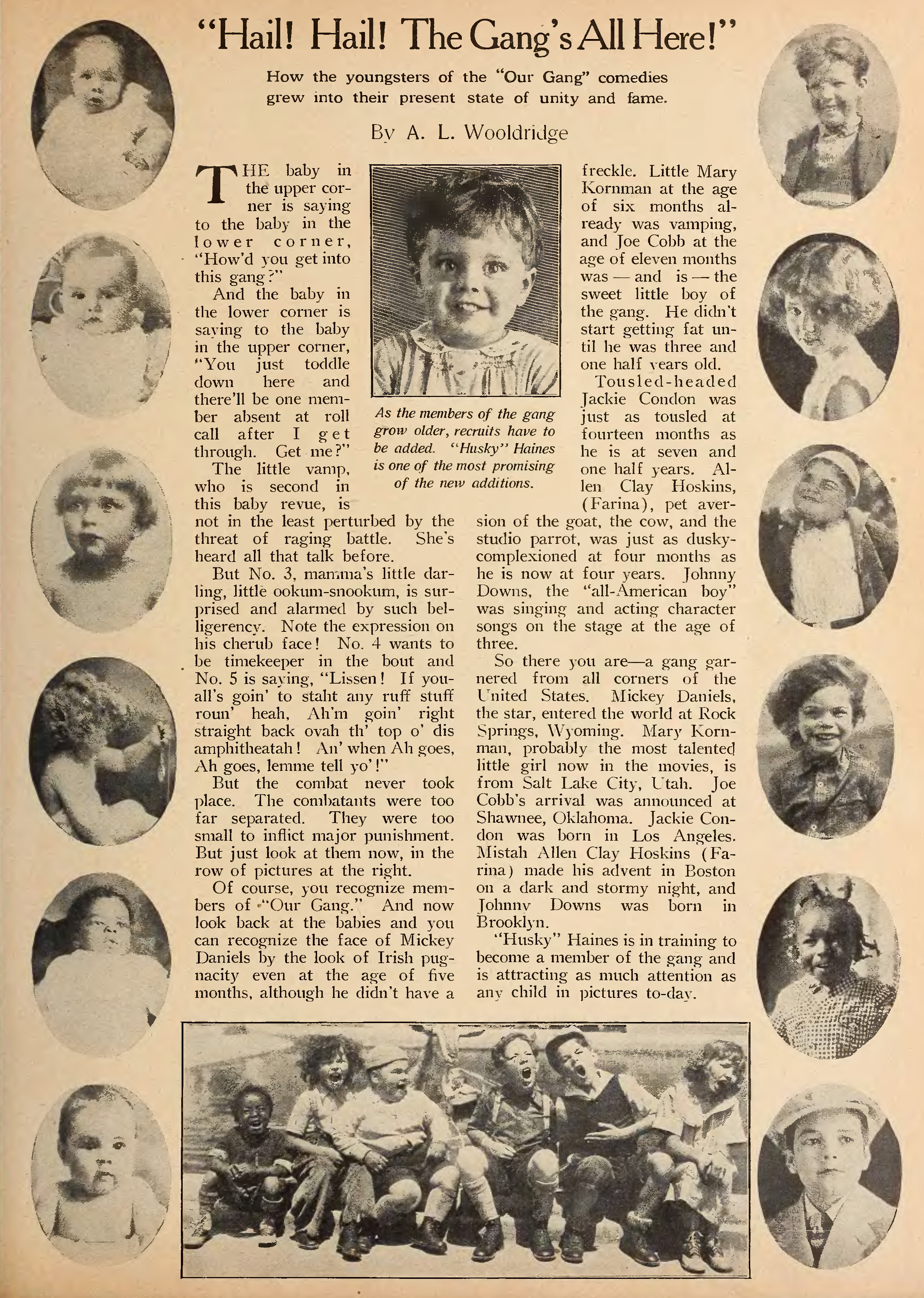
"Our Gang" baby photos in 1926 ad from Picture-Play magazine. Allen Hoskins is the fifth photo down, both right and left

Born in Boston in 1920, Allen Clayton Hoskins was just one year old when his tenure with "Our Gang" began. His character stayed in the series through the silent years and the transition to talking pictures, and he left the series in 1931 at the age of eleven. With his pigtailed hair and patchy outfits, Farina resembled a pickaninny in the tradition of the character Topsy from Uncle Tom's Cabin, but as the character became more popular, and as Allen Hoskins got older, Farina developed his own personality separate from that of Topsy. The name "Farina", derived from a type of cereal, was chosen because its gender was ambiguous: As a toddler, Farina was portrayed as both a boy and a girl, sometimes both genders in the same film.

He was born in Boston in 1920, but soon afterward his parents, Clayton H. Hoskins and Florence A. Fortier Hoskins, moved the family to Los Angeles and in 1922 his acting career began. His younger sister Jannie also appeared in the series as "Mango" (1926–1929) and Hoskins's aunt, Edith Fortier, was his guardian on set, his parents divorced in 1926. By that time he was 6 years old and an experienced child actor, and as "Farina" he made more money than most working adults.

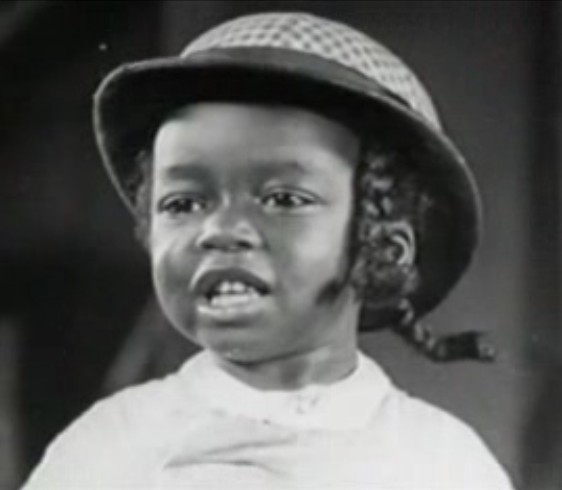
Hoskins in Dogs of War (1923)

The Our Gang comedies were created by Hal Roach Studios, located in Culver City, California. School was required for child actors. Hoskins and the other Roach studio children attended school on the lot at the "Little Red School House". The children were taught by Fern Carter. In 1959, a retrospective article about Fern Carter and her career as a teacher in Hollywood's "Little Red School House" was published. The article explained that she was teaching there when the series began in 1921 and taught over 300 students in a career that lasted 23 years. She often said that Farina was the brightest student she ever had.

The Studio was a family affair and often relatives, staff and other Roach Studio stars appeared in cameo roles or as extras in many of the films including Harold Lloyd, Oliver Hardy, Stan Laurel, Ernie Morrison's father, Ernie Morrison Sr. and Fern Carter's daughter, Wadell Carter. In 1929 Hoskins' aunt and guardian on set, Edith Fortier, also appeared as an extra in the films Noisy Noises and Small Talk.

In addition to acting in the Our Gang short films, the children also made personal appearances. In 1927, the Oakland Tribune published an article about such an appearance. "Countless millions of boys and girls have seen Our Gang comedies but this good luck doesn't befall orphans very often. East Bay orphans, however, are going to get their chance to see these popular screen stars in person..."

During his time in the Gang, Farina became both the series' anchor and its most popular character. While he was not the first black child actor (or even the first black Our Gang kid), Farina became arguably the first black child star. Hoskins' last contract with the Hal Roach Studio called for $350 a week, more than any other cast member was earning at that time. When he finally outgrew the series, he was replaced by Matthew Beard in 1931.

==== Aging ====
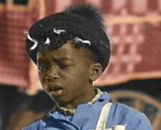
A young Hoskins as Farina in Bear Shooters (1930)

When his career in Our Gang comedies ended because of his age, several newspaper columnists took notice. In 1931, Columnist Jack Lait wrote the following in his Highlights of Broadway, from the Circle to the Square column:

Have you ever wondered what became of Farina, that little black dish that used to take all the punishment in the Our Gang comedies? Lemme spill: Eight years ago Allen Clayton Hoskins, dressed as a girl pickaninny started getting bumps and stopping pies. Millions all over the world knew and liked him. He got $500.00 a week. Now he is 11 years old and is no longer cute so he can't scrabble a dime out of Hollywood. Recently, New York Vaudeville agents were sounded out on a proposed act to be played by Farina and his sister, Mango. Photoplay announces he is definitely through in the films.

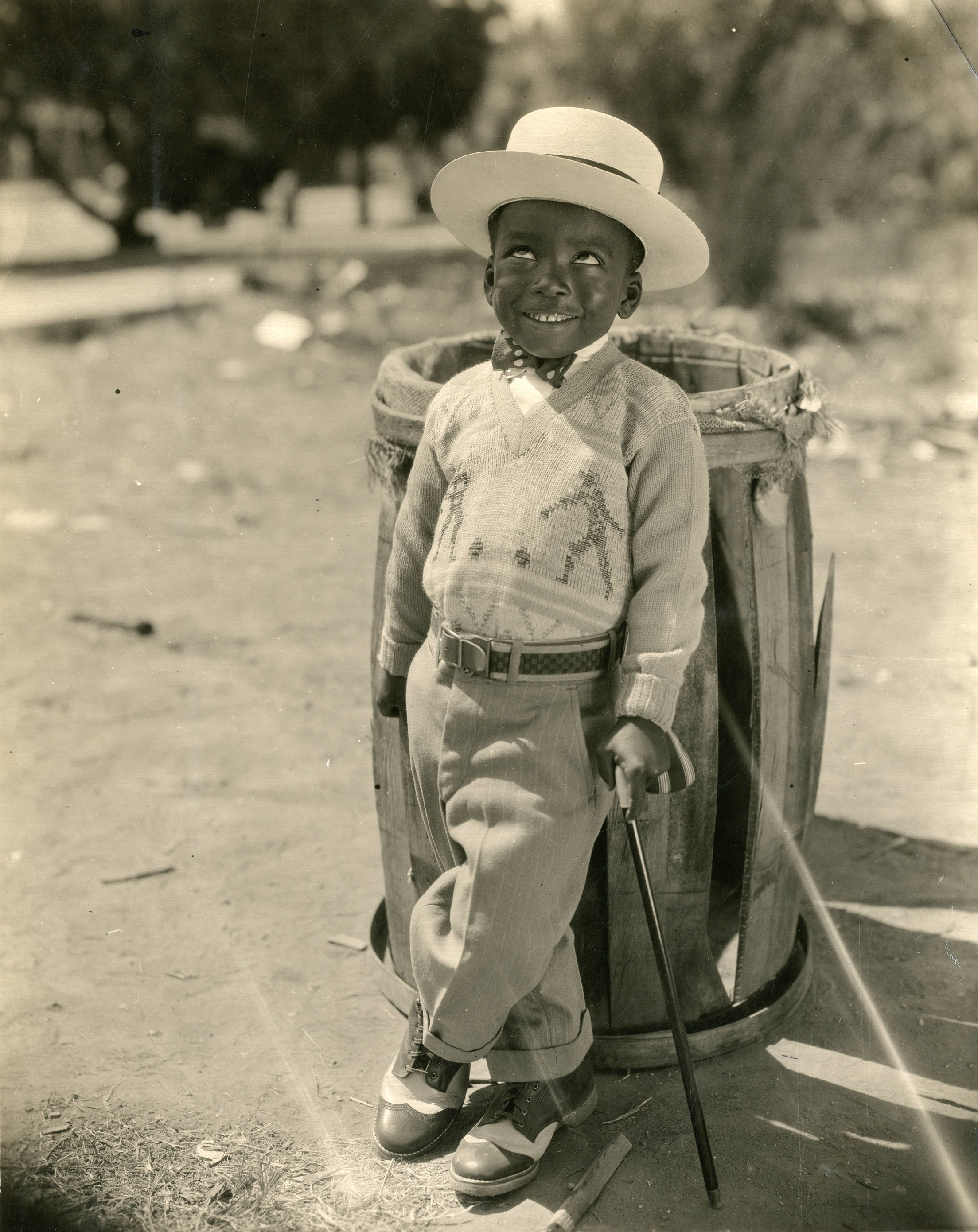
Silent film, in Your Own Back Yard publicity still

On the same date, a column, with no byline, was published in The Register of Sandusky, Ohio:

A star known the country over at the age of three and now eleven years old, flung on the discard. That's the story of Farina, otherwise known as Allen Clayton Hoskins, the negro boy who suffered outrages in the "Our Gang" comedies not the least of those outrages being the necessity of dressing up as a girl even to kinky pigtails. Nine years ago there was practically nothing to this tot but huge rolling eyes and a mass of kinky woolen hair. It was christened "Farina" dressed in rags and immediately hit in the face with a custard pie. Today a spindly colored boy of eleven, Master Hoskins is graduated from the Gang because he is no longer little and cute.

Farina fascinated us because he is the perfect incarnation of poor witless man's struggles against inscrutable and very rough and dirty fate. What a sucker Farina's pictures made of the silly movie "plots". For some years he drew down the elegant stipend of $500 a week and there is probably a tidy sum in the family teapot. At least he was well paid for his bruises of body and soul. He must feel seventy. True his mother hopes to send him into vaudeville with his sister, Mango. It may or may not come off. In movies we fear we may not look upon his like again.

At the end of the studio's 1930–1931 season, Hoskins aged out. Other child actors were let go at the same time, including Norman "Chubby" Chaney and Mary Ann Jackson. While working as actors, all the children attended parties and special events at the studio, including Christmas, when they received any gift they asked for. In January 1931 Farina was a star, earning $350 a week, but by July 1931 he was unemployed.

==== In contemporary press ====
In 1926, several newspapers, including one in Lima, Ohio, carried a story about Farina simply because (it was reported) he wanted to quit playing a girl. "But of course you may not know that Allen Clayton Hoskins is the "sure-enough" name of Little Farina who is having a birthday party out in Hollywood today...now he's getting pretty big and he wants to wear trousers and be a boy on the screen as well as off it..." Exactly one year later (again on his birthday) the same newspaper carried a new story about how Farina learned to act (from his "brother", who did not exist).

Hoskins did not have a brother, but he did have a younger sister, Jannie. She rated her own story when she, too, began to appear in the comedies in 1926. The Oakland Tribune carried a "Movieland" column out of Hollywood, by Jack Wooldridge: "Janie [ [sic]] the little sister of Farina had been added to the cast of Our Gang at the Hal Roach Studios...Janie is two years, 4 months old, black as midnight and all animation..."

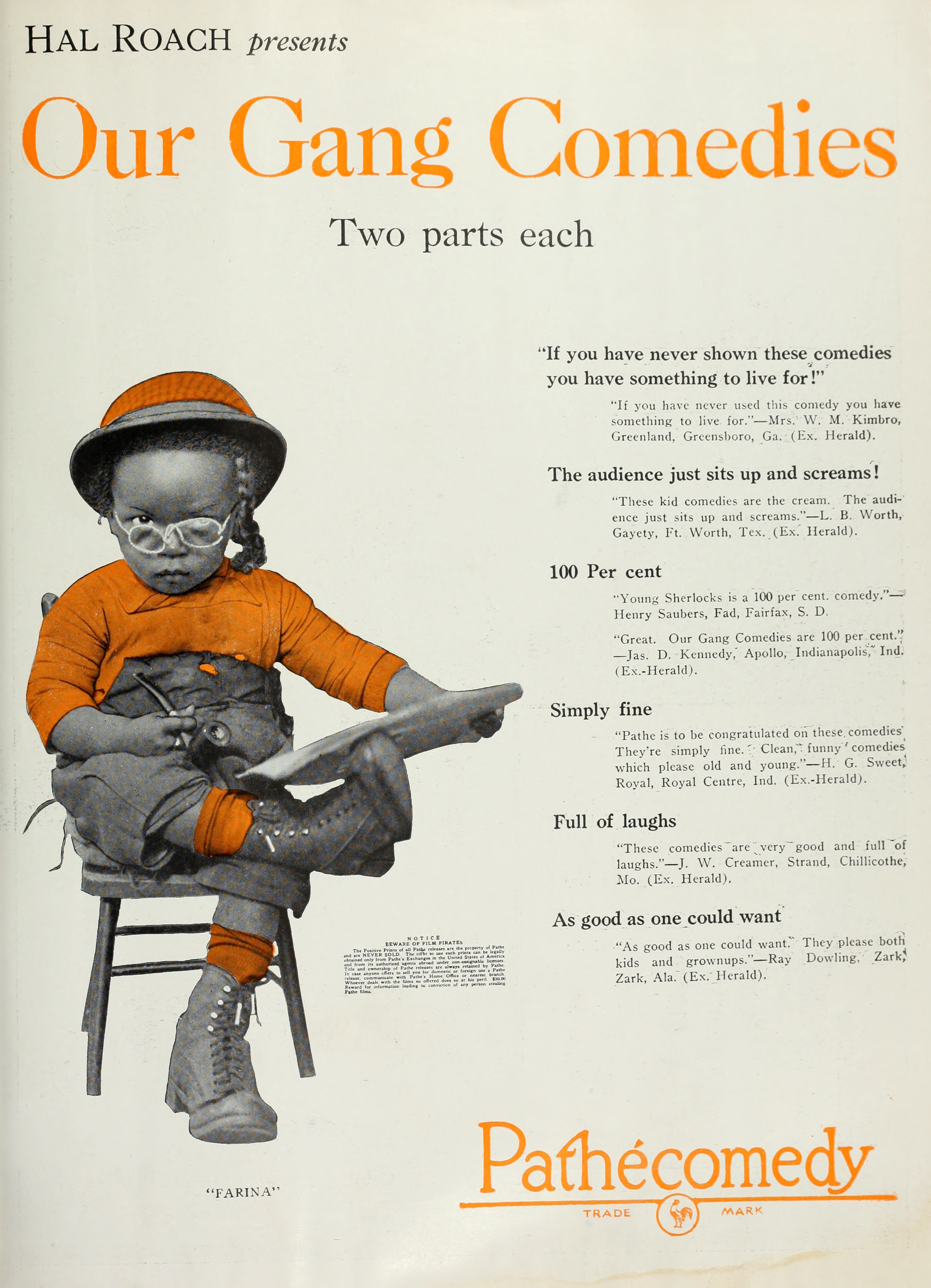
Our Gang advertisement, 1923

Many stories about the Gang appeared from time to time and these were carried in various newspapers throughout the country. Most of them were related to release of a new film. The films, called "shorts", were usually two reels in length and local trade papers, such as "Motion Picture News" and "Motion Picture World", wrote about the Our Gang shorts every time a new one appeared. In 1923 alone, fourteen were released. The children were stars to their fans, both children and adults. The early comedies were silent, but when talkies emerged the studio quickly made this transition and so did Farina. Maltin wrote in his book about the excitement when the first talkie by Our Gang was released

Simplistic as it may seem, early sound films were advertised as "The marvel of the age! Pictures that talk like living people! Electrifying! For "Small Talk" [#89, released May 1929], the trade blurbs read "A sensation wherever it is being shown! Until you See and Hear Our Gang in their first All-Talking Hit 'Small Talk' you can't know the profit power of the Roach talkies. Many theaters are billing them above the feature. When Our Gang made a personal appearance tour they broke every record wherever they played- big cities and small...

As an indication of Hoskins's popularity, the song "Lil' Farina (Ev'rybody Loves You)," words by Harrison G. Smith and music by Alvano Mier, was published in 1925. The cover included a photograph of Hoskins (with his screen and real names), and an approbation from Harold Lloyd.

The fact that all of the children would eventually grow too old and their contracts would not be renewed was also considered newsworthy. An article that appeared in a 1937 Abilene, Texas, newspaper attempted to explain how this worked.

...Six children are always under contract and a child is kept until he out grows the part. There is a complete turnover every four years. Farina...stayed with it for nine years. He and Joe Cobb, the original fat boy who lasted eight years are the exception to the four-year rule...

=== After Our Gang: Vaudeville and other work ===
After Hoskins grew too old for his part, in 1931, he returned to Roach Studios for several cameo appearances but was not chosen for a long-term role. He was given a cameo role in an unusual short film called The Stolen Jools.

... both "Our Gang" and Laurel & Hardy contributed their services to an amazing film called The Stolen Jools - a star-studded short featuring names like Joan Crawford, Gary Cooper, Buster Keaton, Maurice Chevalier and some fifty others. It was a fund raising two reeler for the National Variety Artist's tuberculosis sanatorium. Our Gang's contribution, like everyone else's, was incidental. The kids are shown slurping ice cream cones on Norma Shearer's front steps...

After his career with the Our Gang comedies ended in 1931, Farina and his sister Jannie toured in a vaudeville act accompanied by their mother, Florence Hoskins, in 1932. The exact dates that they toured are not known, but early 1932 found them on tour in Jefferson City, Missouri. The article notes "...Today you are to have the opportunity to see him in person at the Miller Theater. Accompanied by Mango, his sister, the star will do a comedy skit..." The article also praises the other two acts. "...The Five Juggling Jewels...are all that their name suggests when it comes to juggling Indian Clubs... [and] "Diversion A La Carte" offered by Jack Fulton and Peggy Parker...just good fun and songs and that's enough..."

In February 1932, they performed in Toronto, Ontario, Canada. In 2010, Toronto columnist and historicist Jamie Bradburn published a retrospective piece about the events surrounding Farina's vaudeville appearance in Toronto in February 1932: "Like children elsewhere across the continent, young Toronto moviegoers in the 1920s and 1930s eagerly awaited the next instalment of the Our Gang series of shorts...Having grown out of Our Gang after 1931's Fly My Kite, Hoskins and his younger sister, (aka Mango) developed the vaudeville act that brought them to Toronto... On matinee day the STAR featured a front page interview with both children and their mother. Reporter Archibald Lampman (not the nineteenth century poet) noted that Janey "didn't think we were so hot". Bradburn notes that the girl's instincts were on target as the printed interview with "the doggy pickanins of the movies" was a shambling sometimes condescending affair. The occasion was special and the newspaper set up "chairs all around" Bradburn goes on to say that "...Lampman made lame attempts to act as if he was trying to keep up the façade of dignified reporter before giving in to a case of the cutes whenever Hoskins flashed a toothy grin..." The engagement began on February 12, 1932, with a Friday night spot as a special attraction at the Imperial Theatre...The next morning they performed at a matinee at the Imperial, then made brief appearances for adoring fans at two Kresge stores..."

Many of the original advertisements and photographs are included in this article. The siblings are pictured together signing a copy of the "Just Kids Safety Club" card sponsored by The Globe (a copy of the card with his signature and his Los Angeles address are displayed in the column). There is also mention of an interview with Farina's mother. "Mrs. Hoskins hinted at the discrimination the family faced, noting that she seemed far more accepted on the west coast than the east. With a voice that Lampan described as "flowing like an old darky melody" she praised the efforts of Scopes Trial Lawyer Clarence Darrow to improve conditions for blacks in America (presumably a reference to the Ossian Sweet case) and believes that her children's generation would overcome prejudice..." Also of interest is an advertisement promoting Farina's singing ability: "...Appearing this week at the Imperial Theatre, [he] will entertain you...singing the sensational hits 'Home (Where Shadows Fall),' 'Fox Trot' and 'Save the Last Dance for Me', waltz. Copies of these songs, 25 cents at Kresge's stores..."

While Hoskins did find some work after Farina, it was short term. Soon after leaving Our Gang one of his first roles was as the "Host" of the thirteenth episode of the second series of the Voice of Hollywood short-subjects. Among the guests were John Wayne, Gary Cooper and Jackie Coogan, but this was just a one-time event. In 1933, Hoskins, along with fellow graduates Mickey Daniels, Joe Cobb and Mary Kornman returned to Our Gang for an encore appearance in the short Fish Hooky, but nothing more came of it. Hoskins kept his relationship with the studio, however, and in 1936 he was part of an Our Gang tour and later appeared with the Gang on the You Asked for It show in the 1950s.

After his vaudeville appearances, Hoskins returned to Los Angeles, where he auditioned for movie roles. When he appeared in his first feature-length movie, the First National comedy You Said a Mouthful (1932) starring Joe E. Brown, various papers carried the "news" that Farina cut off his braids for his co-starring role in the movie and placed them in the family Bible. After this movie ended, Hoskins continued to audition for other movie roles. From 1932 to 1936 he made appearances in seven full-length films, but most were not credited and his career in movies did not flourish.

== World War II ==
In 1940 President Franklin D. Roosevelt signed the Selective Service Act. Hoskins volunteered to serve in the Army in August 1940, shortly before the first draft registration took place on September 16, 1940. In 1941 Hoskins was stationed at Monterey, California, where a reporter found him:

Remember Farina, the kinky haired little "girl" in "Our Gang" comedies of the silent movie days? Farina is in the Army now. Farina is Pvt Allen Hoskins, Company D, 47th Quartermaster Regiment, stationed at the Presidio in Monterey. When Claudette Colbert, visiting the Presidio leaned from her automobile and called "Say, don't I know you?" Hoskins told the actress only his rank and detachment. "Why didn't you tell her you were Farina?" asked a fellow soldier. "Well, [he replied], "Farina was the name of that other guy she was thinking of – a little guy in a white dress whose contract called for more money in a week than I now make in a year. Farina's grown up. I'd rather she remembered me as I used to be before the world lost its sense of humor.

In one of her 1945 columns (published in various newspapers including the Lowell Sun) Louella Parsons wrote about Hoskins and other actors who served in World War II. "No one at Fort Roach knew the drama back of Sgt. Allen Hoskins appearance there on his last day in the Air Corps. As a boy, twenty years ago Sergeant Hoskins was Farina, in the Hal Roach Comedies. Hoskins saw action in five major Pacific battles and received a presidential citation. He expects to write and produce for the stage and has a musical he wrote in Australia."

Parsons went on to write:

Want to say it again and again and keep on saying it, our boys who gave up studio jobs to go into the service and who have done so much for Hollywood and for their country must get their jobs back. That's one thing Hollywood must not have on its conscience. I mean the bitterness and heartache of these kids. Bob McGowan, who directed "Farina" as a child in Our Gang Comedies, wrote me: 'Thank you for the plug for "Farina", now Sgt. Allen Hoskins. He was a pretty blue little black boy when he failed to get his old job back...we can't have that and neither can any great industry in our country...'
After serving in the South Pacific, it was back to Hal Roach Studios, auditioning for a featured part in Roach's Amos and Andy television series. He didn't get it."

At the close of World War II in 1945, Hoskins was now 25. After his tours of duty he sought to audition for parts outside of the Roach studios but was not selected, even by those studios he knew well. Hoskins started to drift away from performing and retired his stage name.

On the July 24th, 1953 episode of the program You Asked For It that reunited some members of the Our Gang cast, Hoskins explained why he abandoned acting: "I preferred a job that allowed me to eat regular."

== House Un-American Activities Committee (HUAC) ==
Hoskins had survived the war but could not find work back in Los Angeles as an actor. To make matters worse, he was then called for questioning by the House Un-American Activities Committee (HUAC). HUAC was a committee of the U.S. House of Representatives created in 1938 to investigate possible communist activities in the United States. Many industries were investigated, but it was Hollywood that received the most publicity. A retrospective Associated Press article appeared in an Odessa, Texas, newspaper in 1979:

...During the McCarthy era Hoskins was questioned by the House Unamerican Activities Committee which found that as a teenager, he had attended dances sponsored by the Young Communist League and the Socialist Workers Party. The committee took his passport and Hoskins was blacklisted. "But it didn't matter. I wasn't getting work anyway. But I didn't want to stick around and be another has-been. I wanted to do something." Hoskins left Hollywood in 1952 and headed for the San Francisco Bay Area where he met his wife, Franzy. There he painted houses, washed dishes, "anything to make an honest buck", before entering a training program which led to a job as a Psychiatric Technician and eventually to his present position.

== Professional rehabilitation career, 1955–1980 ==
Known to his friends as Al, he and his wife, Franzy, moved in the 1950s to Santa Rosa, where they raised their children and where he began his career in the field of rehabilitation. The exact date he began working at Sonoma State Hospital, located in Eldridge, California, is not known, but by 1963 he was the Sheltered Workshop Director. In addition to working full time, he became concerned about the problems of youth in the South Park area of Santa Rosa, where they lived. In his spare time he developed a proposal for "Weekend House – an Evening and Weekend Training and Counseling Center" for youth. In the Introduction he wrote, "The beginnings of future problems if not met now, can and will develop into serious community problems that left to its own uncontrolled development, will lead to the type of area and social breakdown that have been experienced by other communities in the past..." Part of the problem, he stated, was that "...there are no parks or recreational facilities in the district...". In his proposal, Hoskins identified these issues and offered solutions. A copy of this document survives, but it is not known if he submitted it to the local government.

In 1965 he left Sonoma State Hospital for a better position, and the family moved to Hayward, California. He was now the Sheltered Workshop Director at the Walpert Center, part of the Association for Retarded Children of Southern Alameda County. His career was followed in the local papers, not because he had been a child star called "Farina", but because of his work as an advocate for disabled people. In 1966 he appeared in the local paper, The Argus, reporting on the Workshop's effort to seek funding to complete an expansion: "We're using every inch of available space...We think we have a worthwhile program and we'd like the chance to do an even better job and serve more people..."

In 1968 an article appeared in the Oakland Tribune regarding his efforts to strengthen Sheltered Workshops in his area:

A stripling of an organization, barely 3 years old, the Association of Workshops is making significant contributions to the employment of handicapped people in Alameda and Contra Costa Counties...There are 14 Workshops in the Association. They employ 500 working clients from ages 18 to 70. All types of handicaps – blind, mentally retarded, paraplegic, quadriplegic and others are employed in the shops. Allen C. Hoskins of Hayward, is President of the Association. "What we need is work." Hoskins said. "The hardest thing is to convince manufacturers that we can do a specific job" Hoskins declared. "Once we have successfully bid on a contract, a plant manager usually is impressed with the quality of our work and the ability of our workers... We believe a job is the glue that holds people together." Hoskins declared.

In February 1969, Hoskins was chosen to be Director of the 10th Annual Conference on Rehabilitation Workshops. "The problems of administrating and operating Rehabilitation Workshops for the Handicapped is the subject of the California Association of Rehabilitation Workshops' 10th annual conference... Allen Hoskins, director of the Hayward Retarded Children's Center, 1101 Walpert St. is the program director for this year's convention."

Under his guidance, the Oakland Tribune reported that the workshop was now employing 1,000 clients, double what it had the previous year. "Handicapped workers represent a vast economic resource which has been barely tapped," according to Hoskins, who was also at that time President of the Bay Area Association of Rehabilitation Workshops, which represented 40 Workshops in the Bay Area.

Hoskins spoke at a press conference marking the observance of Workshop Week, which was proclaimed by Mayor John H. Reading of Oakland and other mayors throughout the state. "I have yet to find a business operation in which there is not some item of work which could not be best handled by one of our shops", Hoskins said..."they're a sleeping giant...You call us and we'll survey your company, tell you what we can do for you and make you an offer... What we're looking for is work not a handout."

While working full time, Hoskins also continued to develop creative projects and opened his own studio. In 1976 the Oakland Tribune reported that he was volunteering to help young actors learn their craft at a local nonprofit group, the Experimental Group Young People's Theatre Co., where he was an advisor to the group, "...volunteering his expertise..."

== Black Filmmakers Hall of Fame, 1975 ==
Hoskins was still active in his professional rehabilitation career in 1975 when he was chosen, for his work as an actor, to be inducted into the Black Filmmakers Hall of Fame at the second annual Oscar Micheaux Award ceremony held at the Paramount Theatre in Oakland. Also honored that year were Sidney Poitier, Lena Horne, Ruby Dee and Quincy Jones. He was interviewed about his career then and now:

"I want it on record that I never once traded on the name of Farina. I have built a pretty good name for myself in the rehabilitation field and I hate to sound like a braggart... I think one thing that's been very important to me is that I try not to live in the past." ... The father of six children, Hoskins is involved in several projects including working on his autobiography, a radio series called Walkabout and is head of his own company for creative projects, ALFRAN."

In his acceptance speech, Hoskins asked the question, "What is success?", and part of his answer was, "I didn't get to do what I wanted so I did something I could live with. I think one thing that's been very important to me is that I try not to live in the past." He also thanked the audience: "...I want to thank each and every one of you. I'm sure glad you didn't forget me."

== Retrospective 1979 ==
One year before his death, a retrospective article about his life was published and was printed in various newspapers. "Allen Hoskins says he has fond memories of playing Farina in Our Gang about 50 years ago but he hasn't any residuals. 'I'm sick and tired of people thinking I get residuals or payment for replays of the still popular series,' Hoskins said in a 1979 interview. 'I haven't got no pot of money, I have never tried to trade off the name Farina, I haven't done that – I don't do that.' Instead the 58-year-old Hoskins said he struggled through years of house painting and dishwashing before landing his present job as Public Information Officer for the Alameda County Chapter of the Association for Retarded Children."

== Death ==
Hoskins died of cancer on July 26, 1980, in Oakland, California. Many newspapers, including the Farmington Daily Times, carried the story of his death "...he died Saturday after being admitted in a coma...His wife Franzy, was at his bedside along with his daughter Candy and his son Chris...at the time of his death she said he had been involved in starting a radio series and headed his own projects company known as ALFRAN..."

His wife, Franzy, continued to reside in the Bay Area until her death in 2010, and his sister, Jannie ("Mango"), also resided in Northern California until her death in 1996.

Hoskins was buried without a headstone in an unmarked grave in Evergreen Cemetery in Oakland. It was not until twenty years after his death that Hoskins received a proper headstone, through the efforts of Jan Turner and the Find a Grave website in 2000 (listed under Find A Grave Memorial #8483).

== Selected filmography ==
Year	Title	Role	Notes
1922	One Terrible Day	Farina	
1923	The Champeen	Farina	
1923	The Cobbler	Farina	As Female
1923	A Pleasant Journey	Farina	As Female
1923	Dogs of War	Farina	
1924	Every Man for Himself	Farina	
1925	Your Own Back Yard	Farina	Hal Roach's favorite short
1926	Uncle Tom's Uncle	Farina	
1926	Monkey Business	Farina	
1927	The Old Wallop	Farina	
1928	The Smile Wins	Farina	
1929	Small Talk	Farina	First studio "talkie"
1929	Lazy Days	Farina	
1930	Pups Is Pups	Farina	
1931	Fly My Kite	Farina	Last film as member of Our Gang
1932	You Said a Mouthful	Sam Wellington	Credited as Farina
1933	Fish Hooky	Farina	Cameo appearance Our Gang
1933	The Mayor of Hell	Smoke	Credited as Farina
1933	Life of Jimmy Dolan	Sam	Uncredited
1935	Reckless	Gold Dust, a Jockey	Credited as Farina
1936	The Gorgeous Hussy	Page Boy at Ball	Uncredited
1936	Winterset	Hambone	Uncredited
1936	After the Thin Man	Screwy	Uncredited

== Bibliography ==
- Bogle, Donald. Toms, Coons, Mulattoes, Mammies & Bucks: An Interpretive History of Blacks in American Films, New York: Continuum, 1973 (rev. 2001)
- Maltin, Leonard. The Little Rascals: Remastered and Uncut, Volume 22 (Introduction) [Videorecording], New York: Cabin Fever Entertainment/Hallmark Entertainment, 1994.
- Holmstrom, John. The Moving Picture Boy: An International Encyclopaedia from 1895 to 1995, Norwich, Michael Russell, 1996, pp. 99–100.
