= List of Bella and the Bulldogs episodes =

Bella and the Bulldogs is an American comedy television series created by Jonathan Butler and Gabriel Garza that aired on Nickelodeon from January 17, 2015 to June 25, 2016. The series stars Brec Bassinger, Coy Stewart, Jackie Radinsky, Buddy Handleson, Lilimar, Haley Tju, and Rio Mangini.

== Series overview ==
Season	Episodes	Originally released	
Season	Episodes	First released	Last released
1	19	January 17, 2015	May 30, 2015
2	20	September 30, 2015	June 25, 2016

== Episodes ==
=== Season 1 (2015) ===
No. overall	No. in season	Title	Directed by	Written by	Original release date	Prod. code	U.S. viewers (millions)
1	1	"Newbie QB"	Jonathan Judge	Jonathan Butler & Gabriel Garza and Jeff Bushell & Steven Peterman	January 17, 2015	101–102	2.52
Guest stars: Rio Mangini, Dorien Wilson, Annie Tedesco, David H. Lawrence XVII
2	2	"That's Some Gossip, Girl"	Shannon Flynn	Jay J. Demopoulos	January 24, 2015	103	1.84
Guest stars: Rio Mangini, Dorien Wilson
3	3	"Pretty in Stink"	Shannon Flynn	Jenna McGrath & Rick Williams	January 31, 2015	106	1.46
Guest stars: Rio Mangini, Annie Tedesco, Kalama Epstein
4	4	"Tex Fest"	Jonathan Judge	Jonathan Butler & Gabriel Garza	February 7, 2015	109	1.64
Guest stars: Rio Mangini, Senta Moses, Charlie Weirauch, Patrick Bristow
5	5	"Dancing in the End Zone"	Shannon Flynn	Jennifer Joyce	February 14, 2015	104	1.87
Guest stars: Michael Irvin, Dorien Wilson, Kalama Epstein
6	6	"That's MY Tri-Five!"	Shannon Flynn	Carly Althoff-Mottinger	February 28, 2015	105	2.04
Guest star: Madison Grace Guthrie
7	7	"A Good Bye Week"	Sean Lambert	Peter Dirksen & Jonathan Howard	March 7, 2015	108	1.68
Guest stars: Dorien Wilson, Kalama Epstein, Shanna Strong
8	8	"Bromantically Challenged"	Eric Dean Seaton	Katie Greenway	March 14, 2015	107	1.69
Guest star: Dorien Wilson
9	9	"Tornado Afraido"	Alex Winter	Jeff Bushell & Jenna McGrath & Rick Williams	March 21, 2015	110	1.66
A tornado warning traps the gang at school during Pepper's birthday party. To make up for being late for Pepper, Bella and Newt transform the gym into a cool Parisian scene for a surprise party. However, things go bad when Bella is trapped in the rafters and Newt must conquer his fear of heights to rescue her. Meanwhile, Troy and Sophie go to the school's kitchen to make a cake, but disagree on how to make it, and end up throwing ingredients everywhere. Guest stars: Rio Mangini, Dorien Wilson, Susan Slome
10	10	"Incomplete Pass"	Trevor Kirschner	Carly Althoff-Mottinger & Jay J. Demopoulos	March 23, 2015	111	1.30
Guest stars: Dorien Wilson, Paula Christensen, Tonita Castro
11	11	"Backseat Quarterback"	Sean Lambert	Jonathan Howard & Peter Dirksen	April 4, 2015	112	1.49
Guest stars: Dorien Wilson, Rizwan Manji
12	12	"Traitor Dater"	Sean Lambert	Katie Greenway & Jennifer Joyce	April 11, 2015	113	2.13
Guest stars: Rio Mangini, Dorien Wilson, Andrew Friedman, Matt Cornett
13	13	"Bulldog Buddies"	Sean Lambert	Peter Dirksen & Jonathan Howard	April 18, 2015	114	1.64
Guest stars: Dorien Wilson, Damarr Calhoun, Charlie Weirauch, Senta Moses, Cole Sand
14	14	"Player Hater"	Sean Lambert	Katie Greenway & Jenna McGrath & Rick Williams	April 25, 2015	115	1.49
When Troy begins dating Charlotte Newman, Bella tries to put their past aside, but when she finds out the truth about Charlotte, she does not tell him. Meanwhile, Sawyer accidentally sends a text message to Pepper saying he loves her, which was meant for his mother. This causes Pepper to freak out and send a random string of emojis in reply, and Newt misinterprets it, resulting in awkward feelings between Sawyer and Pepper. Guest stars: Dorien Wilson, Johnnie Ladd
15	15	"Root for Newt"	Eric Dean Seaton	Blake J. Williger	May 2, 2015	118	1.23
Bella tries to help Newt get a spot in a game by finding the perfect position for him in time for his father to see him play. However, when Coach is not sure about Newt playing so close to the playoffs, Bella ends up having to choose between her team and her friend. Meanwhile, Troy attempts to get a date with a high school girl with Sophie's help. Later, Pepper enters a picture contest involving food, annoying a hungry Sawyer. Guest stars: Sydney Park, Dorien Wilson, Andrew Friedman, Aaron Hendry
16	16	"Bulldog Blues"	Trevor Kirschner	Jonathan Butler & Gabriel Garza & Jay J. Demopoulos	May 9, 2015	117	1.63
Guest stars: Rio Mangini, Dorien Wilson, Charlie Weirauch, Senta Moses, Tonita Castro
17	17	"Kicking and Scheming"	Trevor Kirschner	Jeff Bushell	May 16, 2015	116	1.56
Guest stars: Rio Mangini, Dorien Wilson, Will Meyers
18	18	"Third Degree Ba-Burn"	Shannon Flynn	Zach Butler	May 23, 2015	120	1.09
Guest stars: Dorien Wilson, Anthony Keyvan
19	19	"No Girls Allowed"	Jonathan Judge	Jennifer Joyce	May 30, 2015	119	1.39
Guest stars: Rio Mangini, Dorien Wilson, Will Meyers, Michael Bunin, Casey Sander

=== Season 2 (2015–16) ===
No. overall	No. in season	Title	Directed by	Written by	Original release date	Prod. code	U.S. viewers (millions)
20	1	"Wide Deceiver"	Jonathan Judge	Jonathan Butler & Gabriel Garza	September 30, 2015	201	1.49
Guest stars: Kurt Warner, Dorien Wilson, Jovan Armand, Nick Alvarez, Annie Tedesco Absent: Rio Mangini as Ace
21	2	"Girls' Night"	Sean Lambert	Jonathan Howard & Peter Dirksen	October 7, 2015	203	1.21
Guest stars: Matt Cornett, Eric Osovsky Absent: Rio Mangini as Ace
22	3	"Personal Foul"	Sean Lambert	Jeff Bushell	October 14, 2015	205	1.31
Guest stars: Dorien Wilson, Cole Ewing, Taj Speights
23	4	"Rally Week"	Trevor Kirschner	Jennifer Joyce	October 21, 2015	204	1.32
Guest stars: Dorien Wilson, Jovan Armand, Nick Alvarez, Tonita Castro, Quinn Allyn Martin Absent: Rio Mangini as Ace
24	5	"Sha-Boo! Ya"	Sean Lambert	Patrick Bottaro	October 28, 2015	202	1.21
Guest star: Dorien Wilson
25	6	"Who Killed Tex Fest?"	Trevor Kirschner	Sasha Stroman	November 4, 2015	208	1.30
When the town's annual Tex Fest is canceled, everyone is determined to find out why and later discovers it is because all the extra funds that usually pay for the festival have been used to buy new equipment for the football team. As the equipment cannot be returned, the team tries to raise funds instead. Meanwhile, Pepper finds out that her mother is pregnant and is elated, stating all the girly activities she and her sibling can do together, though Sophie states that there is a fifty percent chance Pepper's mother will give birth to a boy, popping her bubble. Guest stars: Dorien Wilson, Jovan Armand, Nick Alvarez, Senta Moses
26	7	"Dudes & Chicks"	John Whitesell	Katie Greenway	November 11, 2015	207	1.54
Sawyer's cousin Charlie comes into town for the Farmers' Market. Bella has hated Charlie ever since Sawyer's ninth birthday, but after Bella sees what Charlie looks like now, she is attracted to him and does whatever it takes for Charlie to feel the same. Meanwhile, Troy, Newt, and Sophie find out that a food truck is getting its meals from a petting zoo and they do whatever means necessary to save the chicks. Guest star: Froy Gutierrez Absent: Rio Mangini as Ace
27	8	"Two Many Dates"	Jody Margolin Hahn	Jay J. Demopoulos	November 18, 2015	209	1.19
Guest stars: Matt Cornett, Froy Gutierrez
28	9	"The Outlaw Bella Dawson"	Jean Sagal	Zach Butler	February 13, 2016	214	1.27
Guest stars: Matt Cornett, Froy Gutierrez, Patrick Bristow
29	10	"Parents & Pigskins"	Sean Lambert	Zach Butler	March 19, 2016	212	1.46
The annual flag football for students and parents is around the corner and Bella is afraid that her mother is going to be an embarrassment, while Sawyer, Newt, and their fathers try to compete against Troy and his uncle. Meanwhile, Sophie and Pepper try to promote Sophie's mother's homemade tamales, but Sophie's mother refuses to give them the secret formula, so the girls try to figure it out. Guest stars: Tony Gonzalez, Dorien Wilson, Annie Tedesco, Aaron Hendry, Myk Wattford, Tessie Santiago
30	11	"Glitz & Grit"	Shannon Flynn	Jonathan Butler & Gabriel Garza	March 26, 2016	210	1.29
Guest star: Courtney Parks Absent: Rio Mangini as Ace
31	12	"Accept No Substitutes"	Trevor Kirschner	Matthew Poisson	April 2, 2016	213	1.39
Guest stars: Dorien Wilson, Pat Finn, Jovan Armand
32	13	"I Love You, Hunter Hayes!"	Shannon Flynn	Rick Williams & Jenna McGrath	April 9, 2016	206	1.30
Guest stars: Hunter Hayes, Dorien Wilson, Charlie Weirauch, Matt Utterback, Steve Sinatra
33	14	"Party of Three"	Shannon Flynn	Peter Dirksen & Jonathan Howard	April 16, 2016	215	1.19
Guest stars: Matt Cornett, Sophie Sabatini
34	15	"Bad Grandma"	Sean Lambert	Jennifer Joyce	April 23, 2016	211	1.11
Guest stars: Senta Moses Mikan, Christina Pickles, Jamie Farr Absent: Rio Mangini as Ace
35	16	"Bella in the Spotlight"	Sam Orender	Sasha Stroman	April 30, 2016	216	1.31
Guest stars: Nick Alvarez, Rizwan Manji, Jeff Witzke, Julia Lester
36	17	"Doggone Record Breaker"	Trevor Kirschner	Jay J. Demopoulos	May 7, 2016	217	0.90
Guest stars: Dorien Wilson, Cedric Yarbrough
37	18	"Tailgating"	Jeff Bushell	Jonathan Butler & Gabriel Garza and Jonathan Howard & Peter Dirksen	June 4, 2016	220	1.31
Guest stars: Matt Cornett, Myk Wattford, Sophie Sabatini
38	19	"Oh Baby, It's the Playoffs"	Jonathan Judge	Katie Greenway	June 11, 2016	218	1.14
Guest stars: Dorien Wilson, Senta Moses Mikan, Rakefet Abergel
39	20	"Biggest. Game. Ever."	Jonathan Judge	Jeff Bushell	June 25, 2016	219	1.49
Guest stars: Dorien Wilson, Cole Ewing, Taj Speights
