= Cleopatra in Space (TV series) =

2019 American animated TV series

- Official promotional image of the series. From left to right: Brian, Cleopatra, Khensu, Akila.
- Genre: Science fiction; Comedy-action; Space opera
- Based on: Cleopatra in Space by Mike Maihack
- Showrunners: Doug Langdale; Julia "Fitzy" Fitzmaurice
- Voices of: Lilimar Hernandez; Katie Crown; Jorge Diaz; Sendhil Ramamurthy; Kari Wahlgren; Xolo Maridueña; Jonathan Kite
- Theme music composer: Jeannie Lurie; Gabriel Mann
- Opening theme: "Written in the Stars" (performed by Lilimar Hernandez)
- Composers: Jay Vincent; Ryan Lofty
- Country of origin: United States
- No. of seasons: 3
- No. of episodes: 26

Production
- Executive producers: Doug Langdale; Scott Kreamer
- Producer: Julia "Fitzy" Fitzmaurice
- Running time: 22 minutes
- Production company: DreamWorks Animation Television

Original release
- Network: Peacock
- Release: April 15, 2020 (Note: The series first premiered on DreamWorks Channel in Southeast Asia on November 25, 2019. The first five episodes were made available to Xfinity customers on April 15, 2020.) – June 25, 2021

Cleopatra in Space is an American animated science fiction comedy television series produced by DreamWorks Animation and animated by Titmouse, Inc., based on the graphic novel series of the same name by Mike Maihack. The showrunners for the series are Doug Langdale and Fitzy Fitzmaurice.

In the United States, the first five episodes were released on NBCUniversal's streaming service Peacock for Xfinity customers on April 15, 2020, making this the first DreamWorks Animation series to be released on a streaming device other than Netflix or Prime Video. On July 15, 2020, the first season was officially released when the service launched nationwide. Prior to its release in the United States, the series was first broadcast in Southeast Asia on DreamWorks Channel beginning on November 25, 2019. The show is geared toward those between ages 6 and 11. Langdale, in an interview, said that he is attempting to make sure the show is "accessible to a younger audience," even as he doesn't give much thought to what age demographic the show is aiming towards.

== Plot ==
Cleopatra in Space is a comedic adventure focusing on Cleopatra's teenage years, as she deals with the ups and downs of being a high school teenager, after she's transported 30,000 years into her future to a planet with Egyptian themes ruled by talking cats, and she is said to be the savior of a galaxy. Cleopatra and her newfound friends work to try and return her to her own time, in Ancient Egypt, as she gains new combat skills in the process. Showrunner Doug Langdale described the show as a "real move-forward story" which continues forward without interruption.

== Characters ==
=== Main ===
- Cleopatra "Cleo" (voiced by Lilimar Hernandez) – The fearless and confident protagonist of the series. The 15-year-old princess of ancient Egypt, whose father is Pharaoh King Ptolemy (Sendhil Ramamurthy), she ends up sucked into a portal that sends her 30,000 years into the future where she learns she is the prophesied "Savior of the Nile Galaxy", destined to defeat the evil space tyrant Octavian. She ends up attending the futuristic intergalactic academy named P.Y.R.A.M.I.D. to obtain the proper training and skills to fulfill her role. She is sometimes reckless and impulsive, but has a good heart and wants peace. She has also gained strange and powerful powers from her time-travel, which manifests in pink and can be used to drain energy and project it into energy waves and beams. Lilimar called Cleo a character who is not completely mature or responsible, but a young girl who is on the road to becoming a hero, a person who is courageous and brave, seeing "a lot of positivity in the world, no matter how dark things seem to be," even as she seeks adventure all the time.
- Akila (voiced by Katie Crown (Note: She also voices Professor Jurval)) – A pink-eyed fish girl from another planet and the first of Cleopatra's teammates. She is very friendly and optimistic, but over-enthusiastic. She may have a crush on Brian. She has two moms: Theoda (voiced by Cissy Jones) and Pothina (voiced by Kari Wahlgren), who are scholars at The Savior Institute, use dated social expressions and love their daughter. They are the first confirmed LGBTQ characters in the series.
- Brian (voiced by Jorge Diaz (Note: He also voiced Gerry and Cheval.)) – A cyborg teenage boy, and Cleopatra's second teammate. His body is mostly robotic and is also sensitive of the fact that he was transformed into a cyborg. He is rather worrisome, paranoid, nervous, and self-conscious at times. He has a crush on Akila. He and Akila later have a foster child of sorts named Eyeball, who is voiced by Brian Posehn.
- Khensu (voiced by Sendhil Ramamurthy (Note: He also voices Vflurf.)) – An intelligent, long-eared cat with the ability to speak. He serves as the leader of the group, and a teacher at P.Y.R.A.M.I.D. He becomes, as noted by showrunner Doug Langdale, like a surrogate father to Cleo, balancing out her action and acrobatics with his intellectual, sensible, and down-to-Earth nature.
- Mihos – The cute and lovable pet of Cleo. Later Doctor Queed says that Mihos can't be native to the planet but rather is a "lost pet." Boop, a female pirate and space squirrel, is his doppelgänger. Lilimar, in an interview, said that while she likes Brian and Akila as characters, Mihos is her favorite, even making a request to make him into a plushie.

=== Supporting ===
- Callie (voiced by Kari Wahlgren (Note: She also voiced Lakshmi, another student at the same school, Marigold Heads, a pirate, a few mercenaries (Bobbi, Terawat, and Urteko), and the Queen of Macaboli, Phoebus.)) – An arrogant and snobby student at P.Y.R.A.M.I.D. who becomes Cleopatra's academic rival upon her arrival in the school. She has fair skin, purple eyes and pale magenta long hair.
- Xerxs (voiced by Dee Bradley Baker (Note: He also voiced Dennis, a student at P.Y.R.A.M.I.D., along with the characters Kek, Assecula, Fungus God, and RK.)) – Legions of alien robots who are the soldiers and servants of Octavian.
- Zaid Antonius (voiced by Xolo Maridueña) – A handsome student at P.Y.R.A.M.I.D., whom Cleopatra is in love with. He is later revealed to be a spy of Octavian, due to the latter holding his parents, Dahab (Candi Milo) and Askari (Dee Bradley Baker), hostages. His family name is a hint towards the historical figure Marcus Antonius. He is a composite of two characters - Antony, a master thief who becomes Cleopatra's love interest, and Zaid, a fellow student who dies protecting her from Octavius - from the graphic novels.
- Administrant Khepra (voiced by Sumalee Montano (Note: She also voices Misti, another member of the cat council.)) – The head of the cat-council. She is the mother of Khensu. It was also revealed later on that she helped Octavian to destroy Cleopatra for the security of P.Y.R.A.M.I.D.
- Octavian (voiced by Jonathan Kite (Note: He also voices the one-time character, Trumpet Guy.)) – The main antagonist of the series. The evil ruler of the Xerxs who has destroyed or enslaved many worlds, and Cleopatra's arch-nemesis. He is bent on capturing and getting rid of Cleopatra so the prophecy about her defeating him cannot be fulfilled. Named after the historical figure Gaius Octavian. In episode 26 it's revealed that Octavian is Gozi.
- E'Geke-Ek'Gek (voiced by Alex Cazares) – an alien student who requires a translator torque to communicate.
- Yosira (voiced by Wahlgren) – The young Pharaoh of P.Y.R.A.M.I.D. She is the granddaughter of the founder of P.Y.R.A.M.I.D., the late Pharaoh Yosiro.
- Zuzz (voiced by Zach Callison) – A student whose body consists of a swarm of insect-shaped "bits".
- Omnia (voiced by Elise Dubois (Note: She also voices Lavitza.)) – A robot representing a planet and part of the debate club at P.Y.R.A.M.I.D.

=== Other characters ===
- Professor Sitre (voiced by Amy Hill (Note: She also voiced Granda and Pink Barbecunicorn)) – a middle-age cat teacher at P.Y.R.A.M.I.D.
- Philo (voiced by Gunnar Sizemore) – A young apprentice at P.Y.R.A.M.I.D., whom Cleopatra mentors in one episode in order to attain the cadets' Level 2.
- Zedge (voiced by Lucas Grabeel) – A popular intergalactic rockstar, whom Akila has a crush on and claims to be his "biggest fan". He was briefly mind-controlled by Octavian to capture Cleopatra.
- Cyrano (voiced by Greg Cipes) – An evil artificial intelligence created by Octavian to counter Brian.
- Gozi (voiced by Karan Brar) – A young Egyptian boy who was Cleopatra's best friend back on Earth in her own time.
- Msamaki (voiced by David Shaughnessy (Note: He also voiced the minor characters Chostipher and Nuvillo.)) – An intelligent, long-eared cat with the ability to speak, and a member of the Cat council.
- Professor Klabrax V (voiced by Dawnn Lewis) – An intelligent, fish-like being who is a professor at P.Y.R.A.M.I.D.
- Dr. Queed (voiced by Paul Rugg) – A former doctor at P.Y.R.A.M.I.D. and an acquaintance of Khensu whose catchphrase is "uncanny scientific brilliance!"
- Debbie (voiced by Candi Milo (Note: She also voiced Ostea, Gurp, Nekkles, and Wodger.)) – A lonely planet who can manifest into various forms and later a student at P.Y.R.A.M.I.D.
- Generator A.I. (voiced by Dee Bradley Baker) – An A.I. located nearby the academy which is used to generate electricity for the campus after Cleo sucks out all the power from the academy.
- Damaris (voiced by Marieve Herington (Note: She also voiced Jane 2000E.)) – A space scavenger, part of a group led by Dave.
- Dave (voiced by Ace Gibson) – Leader of the space scavengers and has a pet named Precious.
- Simon (voiced by Rhys Darby) – A conniving snake who turns on Akila, with Cleo and her parents working together to stop it.
- Gurbo Gorbage (voiced by Kay Bess) – A purported television personality who kidnaps Cleo and almost sends her to Octavian.
- Amsaja (voiced by Kimberly D. Brooks) – The self-declared "Queen of the Space Pirates," who heading a crew of three other pirates, and Cleo's doppelgänger. She previously had the telepathic space shark ninja as her ex-boyfriend, and Octavian might be her ex-boyfriend as well.
- Cyborg Dwayne – (voiced by Andrew Morgado (Note: He also voices Clodswollader.)) – The doppelgänger of Brian who is also on the pirate ship.
- Medjed (voiced by Ken Pringle) – Ruler of Dargham who tries to convince Cleo and Zaid to stay there indefinitely.
- Gled (voiced by John DiMaggio) – Chief of the Tawrisians on the planet Tawris in the Nile Galaxy.
- Commodore Winifred (voiced by Toks Olagundoye) – The commander of a ship of Parvites atop the head of Mihos, whose full name is Commodore Winifred Blurvington the Third.
- Mortimer (voiced by Damian O'Hare) – A lieutenant who serves under Commodore Winifred and resembles a proper British gentleman.

== Production ==
In January 2018, DreamWorks Animation filed trademark applications for the show to the United States Patent and Trademark Office. Since then, DreamWorks has filed for four extensions on their trademark for Cleopatra in Space, two times in 2019, and two times in 2020, all of which were granted.

Mike Maihack said that the series is in retroactive continuity to his comics because Cleo is a teenager and there is time travel. This differs from his comic book series which is "rooted from stories and research of the actual Cleopatra." He also may have been influenced by Kipo and the Age of Wonderbeasts, Avatar: The Last Airbender, Star Trek: The Next Generation, Buffy the Vampire Slayer, and Legends of Tomorrow. In an interview with Charles C. Dowd on I Heart Webcomics on July 22, Maihack said that he consulted in the early stages of the show, letting DreamWorks know the upcoming details of his book and remained supportive, admitting he did not want "a direct adaption of the novels." He further said that he saw the animated series as an opportunity to work on the Cleo in Space concept in another way who had worked on Ben 10: Omniverse and DuckTales, noting that while it was clear that those working on the series understood "the core components of the story," he stepped back, letting the "amazingly talented folks" involved in the show do their work.

In an interview with Jackson Murphy of Animation Scoop, showrunner Doug Langdale said the story lends itself to "serialized storytelling" rather than an animated feature film, and that developing the show has been a "pretty involved process." He also stated that the different uniforms at the academy are "different colors for different divisions in the school and emblems," that they used common science-fiction tropes, that the show is not lesson-based but is just entertainment, and that Mike Maihack was ok with deviating from the original graphic novels, so they could create something that fans would enjoy. Langdale expanded on this in an interview with Screen Rant where he noted that they found Maihack's books, noted that DreamWorks had been trying to create a feature film about it, which was abandoned so they could do a series. He further described the differences between the books and the series, which are on a "day-to-day basis," with the series not following the books closely at all, even as they used the "same set up, [and] many of the same characters." Langdale explained how Egyptian history was an inspiration for many character names, sometimes by coincidence, and how Lilimar Herendez was the choice for the main role of Cleopatra from the beginning, while stating how Sendhil Ramamurthy, Jorge Diaz, and Katie Crown influenced the show through their voice acting. He finally told the interview that the show ended up with a "predominantly female cast," with DreamWorks seeing this as a "good time to make a show with a female lead," and explained that the "first 12 episodes take place within a few months."

In an interview with CBR, Langdale said that he enjoyed Maihack's books, and agreed with DreamWorks to create the show, using Maihack's characters as a starting point, but then "went off in some different directions." He again reiterated that the episodes track the characters on a day-to-day basis, and differed from the original books because Brian and Akila are humans, rather than a cyborg and an alien, with the voice actors shaping their characters. At the same time, he sidestepped the historical debate over her origins.

In an August 6, 2020 interview with ComicBook, Langdale further explained the development of the show. He said that they didn't "literally translate the books," but took the characters Mike Maihack created, some character bits, and did their "our own thing." He added that they wanted to show a "day-to-day story about the characters," different from the books, tried to work in "some ancient Egyptian motifs" and said some inspiration could have drawn from 1970s French comic books, and three divisions in the school: "command, combat, and science." He stated he didn't think about the age range DreamWorks gave him for the show, rather aiming to make an enjoyable show which is "pretty serialized."

=== Music ===
The music of the series is composed by Jay Vincent and Ryan Lofty. It was described by Courtney Lofty, the score production manager, as "an epic cocktail of electronic beats, Egyptian melodies, and orchestral dramatics," with other melodies, with "an extreme amount of time" researching for the music, which references Paramore, M.I.A., and the score of The Prince of Egypt. The music was attuned to the specific scenes in each episode.

The series opening theme song was sung by Lilimar Hernandez, the voice actress for Cleopatra. Additionally, Matt Barrios worked on the main title. Jackson Murphy of Animation Scoop described the song as making it clear that Cleo's story is about "meaning, purpose and destiny." In an August 13, 2020 interview with Sergio Burstein of the Los Angeles Times, Lilimar describes the show as the first thing she has done in the animation field, and was surprised to by their proposal for her to sing the title song. While she admitted she was nervous to sing the song at first, because she hadn't "done anything with music in ten years," she said that working on the show helped her regain her "voice as a singer," while encouraging her to do things out of her "comfort zone," and remained grateful of the positive responses on Twitter. She said something similar in an interview with a Spanish language publication, Siempre Mujer and an interview with a Spanish-language YouTuber, saying the project surprised her because she never expected to sing the theme song and that working on the show was a learning experience. On August 21, in an interview with Alfonso Díaz of RCN Nuestra Tele Internacional, Lilimar called working on the show a "very nice experience," noted that the show was her second job for DreamWorks (her first was Spirit Riding Free), and how she sometimes recorded the lines for the show alone, while other times she did it with the rest of the cast. She also explained the struggles with recording lines, how this show is the first time she has had such a big role, and its relevance during the COVID-19 pandemic with the main cast having to work together under extraordinary circumstances.

In an interview with CBR in January 2021, she said that singing the opening theme was nowhere in her contract and they called her saying they'd like her to sing the song. She decided to do so, even though she was "not in a confident place" with her singing, and didn't think much of it. She wasn't told they were going to use it, then they had a premiere for those on the team, and she brought her mom along, who pointed out it was her. She said that the fact that they used her voice meant "they liked it" and called it "really cool" that she sang the opening.

=== Design ===
According to Langdale, the drawn-out visual development of the show allowed them to have a style close to Mailhack's original graphic novels. He added that the show's crew wanted a visual style which "was going to be fun to look at," with the academy divided into "three areas of specialization...identified by color" which is not directly noted in the show. He further pointed out that one challenge was with the digital 2D animation and they received help from the animators. In a later interview he said that the show's animation sometimes mirrored the scenes in the graphic novels.

==== Character design ====
On September 16, 2020, Bertrand Todesco, the series' character designer, was interviewed by VoyageLA. In the interview, he described how he imagines the "shapes and colors of the characters based on the descriptions" he reads in a script or other document, saying that in draw something differently depending on the age of the audience, and the excitement of working collaboratively with others on various animated shows. He also talked about developing the show's main characters and that with the help of DreamWorks, and others like Angela Mueller, Art Director for the show, his O-1 visa (Note: It was likely an O-1B visa which is for "individuals with an extraordinary ability in the arts or extraordinary achievement in motion picture or television industry.") was approved, allowing him to stay in Los Angeles. According to Langdale, Todesco came up with Akila as a "fish-based character" while they went back-and-forth as to whether Brian would be a human or a cyborg, and that they shaped Cleopatra's character by what "someone with a passing familiarity" of her might think she was as a person.

=== Storytelling ===
In early January 2021, Wei Li, who storyboarded eight episodes for the show, (Note: Specifically "Clubbing", "Team Building", "My Pharaoh Lady", "Double", "Paradise Found", "XerxWorks", "Savior", and "Pirates". He also directed one episode, "Eyeball") shared an animatic from an episode he storyboarded, titled "My Pharaoh Lady," adding that the "show never took off." He later explained what he meant was that the series did not get the "proper distribution," said that he personally thought "the story could be a lot better," and argued the original comic deals with subjects with more seriousness, stated that, "it seems like they radically changed Cleo's personality" from the comics. He later explained that personally, if he could, he would change the episodes "where Cleo supposedly learns from her mistakes," so that the viewers see a "change in her from that lesson in the episodes afterward".

=== Voice acting ===
In an exclusive interview with CBR, Lilimar Hernandez said that this was the first show where she had a major role and that she used her "natural voice" when voicing Cleopatra. She described trying to found out what that voice was and attempting to be as consistent as possible with that voice. She tried her best to keep her "fun-loving nature" and called the voice acting a "cool journey." Furthermore, she said that the team she worked with, like Doug Langdale, and a voice director Sirena Irwin, made her feel excited and comfortable, as she explored the character and the world of the show. In the same interview, she said that the experience was "nice," even as a new person to voice acting, adding that working with people who more skilled in the industry inspired and motivated her. She later said that it was cool "tapping into the fanbase from the books themselves," that she received a lot of "really, really cool feedback" and noted that the production schedule was consistent. She described the group sessions as having the highest energy, with everyone having fun "seeing each other become the characters," with none of it seen as draining.

== Episodes ==
=== Series overview ===
Series overview
Series	Episodes		Originally released
1	13	5	15 April 2020
1	13	1	25 June 2021
1	13	7	15 July 2020
2	6		19 November 2020
3	7		14 January 2021

=== Season 1 (2020–21) ===
No. overall	No. in season	Title	Directed by	Written by	Storyboards by	U.S. release date
Part 1
1	1	"Wednesday"	Julia "Fitzy" Fitzmaurice	Alethea Jones & Belinda King	Eugene Huang, Derek Thompson, & Scooter Tidwell	15 April 2020
Cleopatra, a teenage princess in Egypt, talks about wanting more adventure in her life. When playing a game with her friend, she gets sucked into a portal that takes her 30,000 years into the future – where she meets her new friends at P.Y.R.A.M.I.D. on an Egyptian-themed planet which is ruled by talking cats. This episode premiered in English on DreamWorks Channel in Southeast Asia on November 25, 2019, and on Teletoon+ in Poland on February 17, 2020.
2	2	"Surprise!"	Julia "Fitzy" Fitzmaurice	Doug Langdale	Samantha Suyi Lee, Derek Thompson, & Scooter Tidwell	15 April 2020
It's Cleo's birthday and while she wants to train for combat, Akila wants to throw her a surprise party. This episode first premiered in English on DreamWorks Channel in Southeast Asia on November 26, 2019, and on Teletoon+ in Poland on February 18, 2020.
3	3	"Clubbing"	Jayson Thiessen	Doug Langdale	Wei Li, Thalia Tomlinson, & Gary Ye	15 April 2020
Cleo decides to join a club at school, but it's a lot harder than she'd thought. This episode first premiered in English on DreamWorks Channel in Southeast Asia on November 27, 2019 and on Teletoon+ in Poland on February 19, 2020.
4	4	"Humility"	Julia "Fitzy" Fitzmaurice, Bob Suarez (storyboards)	Belinda King	Aaron Brewer & Chris Ybarra	15 April 2020
Khensu is asked to take Akila, Brian, and Cleo on a special mission into space. As they battle outside a Xerx fortess, Cleo gets separated and tries to join a tribe of very chill creatures which are avowed as nonviolent. She tries to convince them to save her friends, who have been captured. This episode first premiered in English on DreamWorks Channel in Southeast Asia on November 28, 2019 and on Teletoon+ in Poland on February 20, 2020.
5	5	"Akila Says No"	Scooter Tidwell	Belinda King	Eugene Huang, Samantha Suyi Lee, & Derek Thompson	15 April 2020
Brian points out to Cleo that Akila has trouble saying no to any task – and Pharoah Yosira is coming to visit. This episode first premiered in English on DreamWorks Channel in Southeast Asia on November 29, 2019 and on Teletoon+ in Poland on February 21, 2020.
Special
6	6	"Quarantine"	Doron Meir	Doug Langdale	Topher Parnell, Kevin Slawinski, Adam Temple, & Gary Ye	25 June 2021
After a successful mission, Cleo spreads the flu to everyone on campus. This episode first premiered in English on DreamWorks Channel in Southeast Asia on December 2, 2019 and on Teletoon+ in Poland on February 24, 2020.
Part 2
7	7	"Team Building"	Jayson Thiessen	Belinda King	Wei Li, Thalia Tomlinson, & Gary Ye	15 July 2020
Khensu wants to make Cleo, Akila, and Brian into an official team, but they're having trouble working together – which Octavian uses to his advantage. This episode first premiered in English on DreamWorks Channel in Southeast Asia on December 3, 2019 and on Teletoon+ in Poland on February 25, 2020.
8	8	"Do-Over"	Scooter Tidwell	Scott Kreamer	Eugene Huang, Samantha Suyi Lee, & Derek Thompson	15 July 2020
Brian builds a time machine that Cleo tries to use to improve her cruddy day and avoid fighting with Akila. This episode first premiered in English on DreamWorks Channel in Southeast Asia on December 4, 2019 and on Teletoon+ in Poland on February 26, 2020.
9	9	"Suspicion"	Doron Meir	Michael Rhea	Topher Parnell, Kevin Slawinski, & Adam Temple	15 July 2020
It's time for the No Science Fair and Cleo has decided to take this opportunity to find proof that Callie is Octavian's spy. This episode first premiered in English on DreamWorks Channel in Southeast Asia on December 5, 2019 and on Teletoon+ in Poland on February 27, 2020.
10	10	"Mentor"	Scooter Tidwell	Lindsay Kerns	Eugene Huang, Samantha Suyi Lee, & Derek Thompson	15 July 2020
Khensu gives Cleo, Akila, and Brian mentorship assignments so they can graduate to Level 2. This episode first premiered in English on DreamWorks Channel in Southeast Asia on December 6, 2019 and on Teletoon+ in Poland on February 28, 2020.
11	11	"My Pharaoh Lady"	Jayson Thiessen	Belinda King	Wei Li, Thalia Tomlinson, & Gary Ye	15 July 2020
Cleo goes undercover as Pharaoh Yosira at a diplomatic summit to protect her from a threat on her life. This episode first premiered in English on DreamWorks Channel in Southeast Asia on December 9, 2019 and on Teletoon+ in Poland on March 2, 2020.
12	12	"Double"	Jayson Thiessen	Belinda King	Wei Li, Thalia Tomlinson, & Gary Ye	15 July 2020
Octavian sends a shape-shifting "Dittobot" to P.Y.R.A.M.I.D. to capture Cleo. This leads to a showdown at the arcade and the audience finally learns the identity of the spy at the academy. This episode first premiered in English on DreamWorks Channel in Southeast Asia on December 10, 2019 and on Teletoon+ in Poland on March 3, 2020.
13	13	"Rescue"	Doron Meir	Doug Langdale	Topher Parnell, Kevin Slawinski, Adam Temple	15 July 2020
Cleo and the gang defy Khepra's orders to rescue important hostages on the lawless Hykosis City. This episode first premiered worldwide in Polish on Teletoon+ in Poland on March 4, 2020 and in English on DreamWorks Channel in Southeast Asia on April 20, 2020.

=== Season 2 (2020) ===
No. overall	No. in season	Title	Directed by	Written by	Storyboards by	U.S. release date
14	1	"Mihos"	Frank Squillace	Lindsay Kerns	Eugene Huang, Samantha Suyi Lee, and Derek Thompson	19 November 2020
After a mission, Cleo brings home an adorable ferret, as well as suspicious eggs that threaten the academy. This episode first premiered in Polish on Teletoon+ in Poland on April 6, 2020, in English on DreamWorks Channel in Southeast Asia on April 21, 2020, and on ABC Me in Australia on August 17, 2020.
15	2	"Cyrano"	Doron Meir	Belinda King	Topher Parnell, Kevin Slawinski, and Adam Temple	19 November 2020
Cleo tries to figure out where the UTA Tablet is, Brian tries to ask Akila out on a date, and is too nervous to do so. In this situation, Brian turns to A.I. named Cyrano, thinking he will solve his social problems, making him cool. This episode first premiered worldwide in Polish on Teletoon+ in Poland on April 7, 2020, in English on DreamWorks Channel in Southeast Asia on April 22, 2020, and on ABC Me in Australia on August 18, 2020.
16	3	"Paradise Found"	Jayson Thiessen	Doug Langdale	Wei Li, Thalia Tomlinson, Gary Ye	19 November 2020
After spending too much time together, the team splits up on an unknown planet to search for the UTA Tablet. This episode first premiered worldwide in Polish on Teletoon+ in Poland on April 8, 2020, in English on DreamWorks Channel in Southeast Asia on April 23, 2020, and on ABC Me in Australia on August 19, 2020.
17	4	"Cleopatra Needs Space"	Frank Squillace	Lindsay Kerns	Eugene Huang, Samantha Suyi Lee, Derek Thompson	19 November 2020
Brian and Akila go on their first date, and the ensuing chaos leads to Cleo going off on a mission alone. This episode first premiered worldwide in Polish on Teletoon+ in Poland on April 9, 2020, in English on DreamWorks Channel in Southeast Asia on April 24, 2020, and on ABC Me in Australia on August 20, 2020.
18	5	"School Break"	Doron Meir	Belinda King	Topher Parnell, Kevin Slawinski, Adam Temple	19 November 2020
Cleo comes to visit Akila's family during their school break. This episode first premiered worldwide in Polish on Teletoon+ in Poland on April 10, 2020, in English on the DreamWorks Channel in Southeast Asia on April 27, 2020, and on ABC Me in Australia on August 21, 2020.
19	6	"XerxWorks"	Jayson Thiessen	Lindsay Kerns	Wei Li, Thalia Tomlinson, & Gary Ye	19 November 2020
Yosira joins the gang on a mission to the space station and factory, named Xerxs Works, where Xerxs are built. However, Cleo and Yosira disagree who will lead the assault on Xerxs Works. This episode first premiered worldwide in Polish on Teletoon+ in Poland on April 13, 2020, in English on DreamWorks Channel in Southeast Asia on April 28, 2020, and on ABC Me in Australia on August 22, 2020.

=== Season 3 (2021) ===
No. overall	No. in season	Title	Directed by	Written by	Storyboards by	U.S. release date
20	1	"Parasites"	Frank Squillace	Lila Scott	Rianna Liu, Samantha Suyi Lee, & Derek Thompson	14 January 2021
Mihos gets parasites, causing him a serious illness, so Cleo and her friends shrink to a tiny size to help heal him. This adventure becomes stranger and weirder than any of them would have envisioned. This episode first premiered in Polish on Teletoon+ in Poland on April 14, 2020, and in English on ABC Me in Australia on August 23, 2020.
21	2	"Savior"	Wei Li & Doron Meir	Lindsey Kerns	Topher Parnell, Kevin Slawinski, Adam Temple, & Jocelyn Thiessen	14 January 2021
When all the other students at the Academy discover that Cleo is the 'Savior of the Galaxy' of prophecy, she thinks, and fears, she will be treated differently. This episode first premiered in Polish on Teletoon+ in Poland on April 15, 2020, and in English on ABC Me in Australia on August 24, 2020.
22	3	"Ladies' Night"	Frank Squillace	Belinda King	Rianna Liu, Samantha Suyi Lee, & Derek Thompson	14 January 2021
Khepra, head of the P.Y.R.A.M.I.D. council takes Callie, Akila, and Cleo out on a "girls night" to the arcade. Cleo dislikes it until Khepra starts quarreling with a few of the guests. This episode first premiered in Polish on Teletoon+ in Poland on April 16, 2020, and in English on ABC Me in Australia on August 25, 2020.
23	4	"Pirates"	Jayson Thiessen	Belinda King	Wei Li, Matthew Scott, Thalia Tomlinson, & Gary Ye	14 January 2021
Space pirates are proving to be more and more important. On one mission, Akila, Brian, and Cleo are captured by them, but the coolness of the pirates makes it hard to dislike them. This episode first premiered in Polish on Teletoon+ in Poland on April 17, 2020, and in English on ABC Me in Australia on August 26, 2020.
24	5	"Eyeball"	Wei Li	Michael Rhea	Topher Parnell, Kevin Slawinski, & Adam Temple	14 January 2021
Brian and Akila fall into a trap, with Brian reprogamming a broken Xerx who becomes their baby. In order to save themselves, they need to educate this Xerxs robot quickly. This episode first premiered in Polish on Teletoon+ in Poland on April 20, 2020, and in English on ABC Me in Australia on August 27, 2020.
25	6	"Cleo and Zaid"	Jayson Thiessen	Michael Rhea	Matthew Scott, Thalia Tomlinson, & Gary Ye	14 January 2021
At long last, Zaid and Cleo find the UTA Tablet, but guards want Cleo to remain their queen. Cleo is tempted by the offer. This episode first premiered in Polish on Teletoon+ in Poland on April 21, 2020, and in English on ABC Me in Australia on August 28, 2020.
26	7	"Pyramid Scheme"	Frank Squillace	Doug Langdale	Abby Davies, Samantha Suyi Lee, Rianna Liu, & Derek Thompson	14 January 2021
A big betrayal is revealed, with Octavian invading Mayet for real. The fate of the galaxy remains in the balance as Cleo discovers a shocking secret. This episode first premiered in Polish on Teletoon+ in Poland on April 22, 2020, and in English on ABC Me in Australia on August 29, 2020.

== Release ==
In the United States, NBCUniversal's advertisement sales website previously suggested that Cleopatra in Space would be broadcast on Universal Kids. Later, it emerged in January 2020 that the series would instead be included in the launch line-up of Peacock, NBCUniversal's streaming service on April 15, 2020, to Xfinity customers, and July 15 to all customers nationwide.

Prior to the scheduled release in the United States, the series premiered on November 25, 2019, on DreamWorks Channel, which is available in Southeast Asia and select other areas of Asia Pacific (specifically, Hong Kong, Indonesia, South Korea, Malaysia, Maldives, Myanmar, the Philippines, Pakistan, Singapore, and Taiwan). 19 episodes have since aired on the channel. The series also premiered in Poland on Teletoon+ on February 15, 2020 with a Polish dub. The series was also available in South Africa on Showmax, including all episodes in season one by February 23, 2020. By June 9, 2020, all 26 episodes of the show's first season were made available on the Viaplay service in Scandinavia because of an agreement between NBCUniversal and the Nordic Entertainment Group (NENT Group), with subtitles in Finnish, Swedish, Danish, and Norwegian with the dubbed titles of "Kleopatra i rummet," "Kleopatra i verdensrommet," "Kleopatra i rymden," and "Kleopatra avaruudessa," all roughly translating to "Cleopatra in Space."

On May 1, 2020, the entire first season of Cleopatra in Space was released on Globoplay, a Brazilian service and subsidiary of Grupo Globo, with the name Cleópatra no Espaço.

On July 15, 2020, the show premiered on Peacock, with episodes 1–5 and 7–13 of the first season made available to viewers who subscribed to "Peacock Premium", and a more limited selection for those who chose a free plan. (Note: On June 25, 2021, episode 6 was added to Peacock's listings of Season 1 episodes.) It was one of the three animated Peacock Originals streaming on the platform, with the other two being season 13 of Curious George and season 2 of Where's Waldo?. The show can only be watched using the streaming service's premium plan.

On July 15, when the show premiered on Peacock to all those in the United States, Mike Maihack praised the show's release and all the hard work put in, giving it his endorsement. At the same time, he called the release of only 12 episodes "disappointing," and lamented the absence of the sixth episode, "Quarantine," which "deals with a zombie-like flu and the consequences of Cleo avoiding quarantine," saying that it is something the whole world should "be able to see right now." Two days later, when a fan asked about the missing sixth episode and the misspelled title of one of the episodes, an official Peacock account responded, saying they had corrected the episode title, but that for episode 6, "this content is temporarily unavailable on the platform" and that they appreciated the feedback, saying they "will pass it along to the proper team." Later the same day, the same account said that there was "no news on that at the moment." A few months later, on September 1, another fan asked about the episode, and an official Peacock account stated that the episode is "not actively on Peacock" but gave no further explanation as to why that was the case. The episode was eventually released on June 25, 2021.

On August 27, Bertrand Todesco called on Netflix France, and their main office in the United States, to broadcast the show outside the U.S., noting that "international fans" are asking about it every day, and that they could negotiate the rights with DreamWorks. The same day, Todesco thanked the fans of the show, saying he had seen "a lot of incredible" fan art from "all over the web."

In September 2020, the show began airing on the Disney Channel in Russia with the name Клеопатра в космосе.

In October, in the UK, the show began airing on Sky One as part of a partnership with NBCUniversal. In a tweet, Mike Maihack hoped it was "good news" for fans of the show in the United Kingdom who have wanted to watch the show. Currently, the Sky One website allows subscribers to their Sky Go service to watch 25 episodes, but not episode 6, "Quarantine". When asked about this, Sky UK stated that this was not included because of the "licensing on the episode."

On November 19, 2020, Season 2 (Note: Other platforms said that all 26 episodes were season 1, in line with the description from the show's character designer, Bertrand Todesco.) premiered on Peacock. In November, a new poster for Season 2 was released, as was a summary for the season, saying it would focus on Cleo and her friends "embarking on a mission to search the galaxy for an ancient artifact that could defeat Octavian for good," and a preview video. On November 19, 2020, Season 2, premiered on Peacock.

On January 9, 2021, in Canada, the series started airing on Family CHRGD (now WildBrainTV). Then on January 14, 2021, Season 3 was released on Peacock.

On January 14, 2021, Season 3 was released on Peacock. On July 14, 2021, all three seasons were added to Hulu.

On July 14, 2021, the "Complete First Season" of the series, along with the Spanish version, Cleopatra en el Espacio, was released on Hulu, consisting of all three seasons which were released on Peacock.

== Reception ==
Encyclopedia of Science Fiction contributor Steven Pearce gave a short positive review of the show, though was critical about the show's writing and Cleopatra's personality, saying it is "very much your feisty American teen." The entry praises the "nice background details" and calls the series fun, amusing, "brightly animated and engaging." Courtney Lofty described the series as being about "badass women, talking cats, [and] space," noting that the overall vibe is a "classic Saturday morning cartoon, with extremely quotable moments" which is like Invader Zim. Cheryl Eddy on Gizmodo described the show as one aimed at children, but "looks like a fun ride for geeky grown-ups", while Karen Han and Petrana Radulovic in Polygon and Sam Stone on CBR reviewed it positively. Additionally, others described the show as "a fun take on the original Cleopatra story" and a "comedic adventure" which focuses on Cleopatra's teenage years, where she is transported into the future "to an Egyptian-themed planet...ruled by talking cats" while dealing with the pressures of being "a teenager in high school" as she tries to fit in even as Octavian tries to kill her. Later, Petrana Radulovic wrote a positive review of the show. She described the series as wacky and vibrant, using its "zany concept effectively," having interesting adventures, and has main characters who have "typical stock cartoon personalities." At the same time, she compared the impulsive and cocky behavior of Cleo to Lance in Voltron: Legendary Defender and Ben in Ben 10. She further contrasted Cleopatra to Korra in The Legend of Korra and Adora in She-Ra and the Princesses of Power in that she is not ready to accept her destiny but will have to "confront her own laziness," remaining as a "carefree, imperfect heroine" in the meantime. Radulovic also said that the "electronic-infused Egyptian melodies of the score" make it stand out, as do the outfits of the characters, while noting that the show is episodic like Gravity Falls rather than something like She-Ra and the Princesses of Power.

There were a number of other reviews of the show. In an episode of Tooned Up on the Renegade Pop Culture Podcast, one of the guests described the show as having a stellar voice cast, sharp writing, which is "almost too self aware," while saying that they wished that the animation budget "was a little bit higher." The same guest said that the show skews to those "a little bit younger" and said that the show takes a "few episodes to find its stride," but once it does that, it is "one of the easiest shows to binge." Another reviewer took a different tack, focusing on themes of libraries in the show, writing in the ALA's I Love Libraries, writing that the library at Cleopatra's futuristic high school contains information saved from the show's villain, who destroyed most of recorded knowledge, and noting that the library's section on Ancient Egypt, would, if in a real library, "be housed in a library's special collections." In contrast, Ashley Moulton on Common Sense Media rated the series 3 out of 5, noting that there is "a lot of fantasy violence," while saying that Cleopatra is a "fearless female lead," with her potential as a role model "offset by the fact that she can be impulsive, impatient, overconfident, and not so dedicated to her schoolwork," adding that there is "mild language...and flirtation," saying that the show isn't educational even though it "features a historical character." Rather it is, in Moulton's view, focused on entertainment "in the vein of '80s Saturday morning cartoons," and she describes the series as "light, fun tween sci-fi" animation which explores the past and future, while praising the "interesting alien species, exciting fight scenes, and fun gadgets like robots and hover boards," and the world they live in as "pretty cool." Even so, she argued that the characters are flat, while the characters "gleefully engage in moderately violent fight scenes" to defeat villains, and calling the characters "disappointing".
