= The Little Rascals Save the Day =

- Directed by: Alex Zamm
- Written by: Alex Zamm; William Robertson
- Based on: Our Gang by Hal Roach
- Produced by: Mike Elliott; Greg Holstein; Jerry P. Jacobs
- Starring: Doris Roberts; Greg Germann; Lex Medlin; Valerie Azlynn; Jet Jurgensmeyer; Drew Justice; Jenna Ortega; Connor Berry; Isaiah "Zay Zay" Fredericks; Camden Gray; Eden Wood; Grant Palmer; Chase Vacnin; Rio Mangini
- Cinematography: Levie Isaacks
- Edited by: Heath Ryan
- Music by: Chris Hajian
- Production company: Universal 1440 Entertainment
- Distributed by: Universal Pictures Home Entertainment
- Release date: April 1, 2014
- Running time: 98 minutes
- Country: United States
- Language: English

The Little Rascals Save the Day (originally titled The Little Rascals 2: Rascals' Beginning or The Little Rascals to the Rescue in development) is a 2014 American comedy film released by Universal Pictures Home Entertainment. Succeeding the film released in 1994, it is the second color feature film adaptation of Hal Roach's Our Gang, a series of short films of the 1920s, 1930s and 1940s (many of which were broadcast on television as The Little Rascals) which centered on the adventures of a group of neighborhood children.

With a screenplay by William Robertson and Alex Zamm – who also directed – The Little Rascals Save the Day presents several of the Our Gang characters in an updated setting, and features re-interpretations of several of the original shorts.

== Plot ==
On the last day of school before summer vacation, Spanky, Alfalfa, Mary Ann, and Stymie try to leave early by having Buckwheat and Porky tell Miss Crabtree that they need to go home. Miss Crabtree agrees to let the four kids go, forcing them out of her surprise ice cream cake party for the class. The Rascals head over to Grandma Larson's bakery, and bump into Officer Kennedy along the way. Kennedy is dating Miss Crabtree, and the kids ask him why he has not proposed to her. They form The International Silver String Submarine Band as there is a big talent show. The band plans on playing Sonny & Cher's "I Got You Babe" for the talent show but wind up sounding terrible. Alfalfa suggests making the performance better by getting Darla to sing the song with him. During band practice, Grandma is asked to visit the local bank and leaves the kids in charge of her bakery. The gang is asked to prepare a red velvet cake, but they put too much yeast in, causing the inflating dessert to explode in the kitchen. Meanwhile, a bank officer informs Grandma that she owes the bank $10,000. If she is unable to pay the money in two weeks, she will lose her bakery. To make matters worse, Waldo Kaye's father wants to buy the bakery and replace it with a shopping mall. Waldo wants the kids' tree house for himself and ends up setting off the burglar alarm.

Spanky suggests the gang get jobs in order to help save Grandma's bakery. Porky, Buckwheat, Mary Ann and Stymie all offer their services in professional working environments but are turned away at each one. Spanky and Alfalfa get jobs as Mr. Kaye's caddies at the local country club, but the two are quickly kicked out of the club and fired after Spanky interrupts Officer Kennedy's date with Miss Crabtree by accidentally hitting a golf ball at the policeman's forehead. This does not stop Spanky. He suggests a pet washing business, which quickly goes haywire after he mistakenly replaces a bottle of shampoo with one containing green dye. The fur of several pets turns green, including Darla's cat. Alfalfa tries to make up for it by offering Darla a ride to the library on his bicycle, but she instead decides to go with Waldo in his toy car. This gives Spanky the idea for the Rascals to build their own taxi cab. This business also ends poorly after Waldo cuts the car's brake wires, sending them down a steep hill and into a gazebo.

Darla, who was riding in the taxi, once again leaves Alfalfa for Waldo. Officer Kennedy, who has constantly had his dates with Miss Crabtree interrupted by the Rascals, yells at the kids for ruining yet another attempt at proposing marriage to the schoolteacher. Angered that Kennedy does not like children, Miss Crabtree breaks up with him. Spanky next decides to have Alfalfa get into the wrestling ring against the mysterious Masked Marvel. Porky is to play Alfalfa's opponent, which he accidentally says to Waldo. Waldo then hires Butch and Woim to stop Alfalfa from winning the wrestling match. Butch takes Porky's place in the ring and easily beats Alfalfa. To make matters worse, Waldo convinces Spanky to bet the money he had made from the match to him in the event that Alfalfa loses. Angered at their leader's poor decision and his bossy attitude, the rest of the gang turn against Spanky, but after a talk with Grandma, Spanky is able to rekindle his friendship with the others.

The kids now begin rehearsing for the talent show, their last chance at earning the $10,000 for Grandma. Meanwhile, Miss Crabtree agrees to continue dating Officer Kennedy on the condition that he attends the kids' talent show with her. Kennedy reluctantly agrees. At the talent show, the gang are up against several professional acts including a song-and-dance routine by Waldo and Darla, but Waldo continuously pushes Darla out of the spotlight and she eventually leaves him after he attempts to sabotage the International Silver String Submarine Band's performance. The band's rendition of "I Got You Babe" starts poorly and gradually gets fair, and gets even better when Darla arrives to sing with Alfalfa. The Rascals win the $10,000, Darla officially joins the gang's band (and becomes Alfalfa's girlfriend), Grandma's bakery is saved, and Miss Crabtree agrees to marry Officer Kennedy.

During the end credits, Waldo gets a "tree house" from his Dad as promised, in the form of a miniature of their own huge mansion. When his Dad offers Waldo to christen it himself, Waldo proudly announces it a members-only place and strikes the bottle to one of its pillars. However, instead of the bottle, the pillar develops a crack, which then spreads throughout the house and within a moment, it shatters to dust. Waldo's Dad comments to a shocked Waldo, that he might still have the receipt.

== Cast ==
- Jet Jurgensmeyer as Spanky
- Drew Justice as Alfalfa
  - River Alexander in singing voice
- Connor Berry as Stymie
- Jenna Ortega as Mary Ann
- Camden Gray as Porky
- Isaiah "Zay Zay" Fredericks as Buckwheat
- Jules as Petey
- Eden Wood as Darla
- Grant Palmer as Waldo
- Lex Medlin as Officer Kennedy
- Valerie Azlynn as Miss Crabtree
- Greg Germann as Ray "Big Ray" Kaye
- Doris Roberts as Grandma
- Chase Vacnin as Butch
- Rio Mangini as Woim
- Brian Stepanek as Sergio
- French Stewart as Bank Officer
- Robert Torti as TV Show Host Leo McCarey
- Bug Hall as Delivery Man / Ice Cream Man. Hall previously portrayed Alfalfa in the first film.
- Brittany Ashton Holmes as Connie, Darla's mother. Homes played Darla in the first film.
- Mindy Sterling as Talent Coordinator

Additionally, Billy Johnston appears as Freckle-Faced Boy; Jim Blanchette appears as Customer #1; James Hallett appears as Golf Club Manager; Steve Monroe appears as Mailman; Cathy Giannone appears as Customer #2; and Dashell Zamm appears as McKibble The Magnificent.

== Production ==
The film was originally titled The Little Rascals to the Rescue during development.

== Notable themes ==
Many gags and plot devices borrowed from original Our Gang/Little Rascals shorts. These include:

- The kids getting themselves kicked out of school during a classroom party appeared in the Little Rascals short Teacher's Pet (1930).
- The primary plot involving saving Grandma's bakery was borrowed from Helping Grandma (1931).
- The kids' band, The International Silver String Submarine Band, was original featured in the Little Rascals film Mike Fright. In a deleted scene, Spanky and Alfalfa interrupt Butch's trombone performance by eating lemons. This gag was also borrowed from Mike Fright.
- The kids preparing a cake was borrowed from 1932's Birthday Blues. The sounds that the cake makes inside of the oven are also based on those made by the cake in Birthday Blues.
- Spanky and Alfalfa getting jobs as caddies was the plot for the Little Rascals comedy Divot Diggers.
- A parrot says, "Remarkable!", a nod to the Our Gang film Forgotten Babies. In a deleted scene, the parrot also says, "Yum, yum! Eat 'em up!", a nod to The Kid from Borneo.
- The kids' handmade taxi, and the idea of it going down a steep hill were borrowed from Free Wheeling.
- Alfalfa fighting the Masked Marvel, which turns out to be Butch, was originally featured in the Little Rascals comedy Came the Brawn.

The film features a handful of inside jokes for fans of both the original Little Rascals and the 1994 film adaptation. These include:

- The kids attend Robert McGowan Elementary School. Robert McGowan directed over 100 of the 220 original Little Rascals shorts between 1922 and 1933.
- Miss Crabtree's first name is June, while Officer Kennedy's first name is Edgar. This is a nod to June Marlowe and Edgar Kennedy, the actors who portrayed Miss Crabtree and Officer Kennedy in the original Little Rascals shorts.
- A marquee on a movie theater reads "Hal Roach Film Festival". Hal Roach was the producer creator of the Our Gang/Little Rascals series.
- The talent show host is named Leo McCarey. McCarey worked on several of the original Little Rascals shorts.
- Bug Hall, who portrayed Alfalfa in the 1994 film, cameos as an ice cream man. In a deleted scene, he suggests that Alfalfa reminds him of himself when he was younger.
- The "figurine" on the cab is the same as the figurine on "Blur 2: The Sequel".

== See also ==
- Our Gang (original Little Rascals film series)
- The Little Rascals (animated TV series)
- The Little Rascals (1994 feature film)
