= Bella and the Bulldogs =

American comedy television series

- Genre: Comedy
- Created by: Jonathan Butler & Gabriel Garza
- Starring: Brec Bassinger; Coy Stewart; Jackie Radinsky; Buddy Handleson; Lilimar; Haley Tju; Rio Mangini
- Composer: Ron Wasserman
- Country of origin: United States
- Original language: English
- No. of seasons: 2
- No. of episodes: 39 (list of episodes)

Production
- Executive producer: Jeff Bushell
- Producer: Chris Phillips
- Camera setup: Multi-camera
- Running time: 22 minutes
- Production company: Nickelodeon Productions

Original release
- Network: Nickelodeon
- Release: January 17, 2015 – June 25, 2016

Bella and the Bulldogs is an American comedy television series created by Jonathan Butler and Gabriel Garza that aired on Nickelodeon from January 17, 2015 to June 25, 2016. The series stars Brec Bassinger, Coy Stewart, Jackie Radinsky, Buddy Handleson, Lilimar, Haley Tju, and Rio Mangini.

== Premise ==
The series follows cheerleader Bella Dawson whose life in Texas takes an unexpected twist when she is recruited to become the new quarterback for her school's football team, the Bulldogs. At first, the rest of the team does not want her as the quarterback since she is a girl and it was an all boys middle school team, but they eventually accept her for her talent. As the show goes on it goes into her and her friends' teen drama and dating life.

== Episodes ==
Season	Episodes	Originally released	
Season	Episodes	First released	Last released
1	19	January 17, 2015	May 30, 2015
2	20	September 30, 2015	June 25, 2016

== Cast ==
=== Main ===
- Brec Bassinger as Bella Dawson
- Coy Stewart as Troy
- Jackie Radinsky as Sawyer
- Buddy Handleson as Newt
- Lilimar as Sophie
- Haley Tju as Pepper
- Rio Mangini as Ace (recurring: season 1, main: season 2)

=== Recurring ===
- Dorien Wilson as Coach Russell
- Annie Tedesco as Carrie Dawson
- Nick Alvarez as Luis DelaRosa
- Matt Cornett as Zach Barnes
- Senta Moses as Mrs. Silverstein

== Production ==
On March 4, 2015, the series was renewed for a second season. The second season premiered on September 30, 2015. Actress Brec Bassinger stated in a Twitter message about the episode airing on June 25, 2016: "I hope y'all enjoyed the last episode of #bellaandthebulldogs ..."

== Broadcast ==
Bella and the Bulldogs premiered on March 18, 2015, on YTV in Canada and on Nickelodeon in Australia and New Zealand on April 4, 2015. The series premiered on the Southeast Asian feed of Nickelodeon in Singapore and the Philippines on April 6, 2015, and in Malaysia on April 11, 2015. In the United Kingdom and Ireland, Nickelodeon debuted the series on May 4, 2015. In Africa, the pilot debuted on June 26, 2015, and the series officially premiered on September 7, 2015.

== Reception ==
=== Ratings ===
Viewership and ratings per season of Bella and the Bulldogs
Season	Episodes	First aired		Last aired		Avg. viewers (millions)
Season	Episodes	Date	Viewers (millions)	Date	Viewers (millions)	Avg. viewers (millions)
1	19	January 17, 2015	2.52	May 30, 2015	1.39	1.65
2	20	September 30, 2015	1.49	June 25, 2016	1.49	1.29

=== Awards and nominations ===
Year	Award	Category	Result	Ref.
2016	Kids' Choice Awards Mexico	Favorite International Program	Won	
2016	Kids' Choice Awards Colombia	Favorite International Program	Nominated	
