= Cleopatra in Space =

2014 comics series

Publication information
- Publisher: Graphix

Creative team
- Written by: Mike Maihack
- Artist: Mike Maihack

Cleopatra in Space is an American children's graphic novel series drawn and written since 2014 by Mike Maihack, and published by Graphix, a division of Scholastic.

The premise of the series is that a teenaged Queen Cleopatra is brought to the far future to attend school and fight a space tyrant together with her friends Akila and Brian. So far, six books have been published: Target Practice (2014, ISBN 978-0545528436), The Thief and the Sword (2015, ISBN 978-0545528450), Secret of the Time Tablets (2016, ISBN 978-0545838672), The Golden Lion (2017, ISBN 978-0545838726), Fallen Empires (2019, ISBN 978-1338204124), and Queen of the Nile (2020, ISBN 978-1338204155). Maihack revealed in October 2020 he wrote the protagonist, Cleopatra, as a character with bit of ADHD and having "depressive disorder."

== Plot summary ==
=== Book 1: Target Practice ===
In Ancient Egypt, fifteen-year-old princess Cleopatra shirks her school lessons and goes playing with her best friend Gozi. They discover a hidden tomb filled with all sorts of old artifacts, including a black-bladed khopesh and a stone tablet. As Cleopatra reads out a prophecy on the tablet, a bright light flashes, and she finds herself instantly transported thousands of years into the future, to the planet Mayet in the Ailuros System within the Nile Galaxy, which is populated by sentient cats, aliens and humans alike. She is received by Khepra, administrator of P.Y.R.A.M.I.D. (Pharao Yasiro's Research And Military Initiative of Defense) and head of its Cat Council, and Khensu, her son and a historian at Yasiro Academy, which is administrated by P.Y.R.A.M.I.D.

Khepra explains that Cleopatra is their prophesied savior from Xaius Octavian, a brutal dictator, and his army, the Xerx, after him having erased all electronically stored knowledge in the galaxy. However, Ailuro's late pharao Yasiro had taken steps to preserve knowledge in written form, thus enabling Ailuro to become a center of resistance against Octavian. Since they have no way of sending Cleopatra home, they enroll her in the academy, where she meets and befriends her fellow students Akila Theoris (her roommate), Akila's best friend Brian Bell (an inventor), and Zaid, as well as Pharaoh Yosira, Yasiro's granddaughter. Except for defense classes, Cleopatra has trouble fitting in academically, but finds herself adored by the student body, who know of her messiah role.

Four months later, the Cat Council, pressed into action by Octavian's inexorable advance on Ailuros, decides to test Cleopatra by having her retrieve an ancient artefact from its hiding place, despite Khensu's objections. Despite her lack of experience, and with a good deal of luck, Cleopatra manages to gain the object, which is the black khopesh she and Gozi had found in the past.

=== Book 2: The Thief and the Sword ===
Octavian hires a skilled young thief, Antony, to steal the black khopesh - called the Sword of Kebechet - from P.Y.R.A.M.I.D.'s vault. While he succeeds, he accidentally runs into Cleopatra, who is attending a winter dance party at the nearby academy. When she recoginizes the sword, she chases Antony all over the academy, but is called off by Khensu (on Khepra's orders), allowing Antony to escape.

Seeing her frustration, Akila and Brian reveal to Cleopatra that they have found archival records about the stone tablet which brought her into the future. The tablet was one of two, the Ata and the Uta Tablets, created by Thoth after the god foresaw the rise of Octavian and the hero who would stop him before he retreated to a faraway world called Duat. The tablets could only be activated by the designated hero - Cleopatra - and that the Uta would be needed to transport her back to the past; a fact which could be exploited by Octavian if he could find a way to activate it himself. The trio enlists the reluctant aid of Khensu, who takes Zaid along as a decoy to commandeer a transport to planet Hykosis, a nest of scum and pirates at the edge of Ailuros, where they expect to find the tablets. He also discloses that he discovered the sword Cleopatra has recovered is a fake, and that there is a little-known part about the savior's prophecy regarding the sword.

Meanwhile, Antony delivers the fake sword to Octavian, who destroys it and then tries to kill Antony, who escapes to Hykosis. When Cleopatra and her friends depart for Hykosis, Octavian sends his entire armada after them.

=== Book 3: Secret of the Time Tablets ===
Unable to outrun their pursuers, Cleopatra's team try to use their ship's escape pods, but Cleopatra, Akila and Brian are separated from Khensu and Zaid. After reaching Hykosis, they infiltrate its capital and encounter Antony being cornered by bounty hunters, led by one Fod Franze, after Octavian posted a reward on his head. After fighting them off together, the youths join forces to find the tablets, and Antony leads them to Harkhebi, a cat who runs a secret orphanage in which Antony grew up and collects ancient artefacts. Forced to fight a Xerx, Cleopatra unexpectedly manifests a strange power, and Antony recognizes her as the prophesised messiah. After learning about the true nature of the tablets, he realizes that Octavian might also know that Harkhebi has them, and they hurry toward the orphanage.

Meanwhile, Khensu and Zaid have landed in a different part of Hykosis and made their way to Harkhebi, from whom Zaid learns that his parents Ziyad and Sadia were vital contributors to Harkhebi's cause until they were killed by the Xerx. Khensu and Zaid receive a key to the tablet's hiding place from Harkhebi, but after they leave, it is revealed that Octavian has found the orphanage and forced Harkhebi to use Cleopatra and her friends to find the Ata tablet for him. He mortally injures Harkhebi just before Cleopatra, Antony and Akila arrive, but Harkhebi is able to direct them to the hiding place before he dies.

At their destination, Cleopatra and her friends find Octavian already present, with Khensu and Zaid as his prisoners. They attack, but Octavian proves invulnerable to anything they throw at him, and Akila's left arm is crushed by a falling rock. With her friends' lives on the line, and as the only one who can retrieve the tablet, Cleopatra accompanies Octavian into the tomb where it is hidden. As they enter, Octavian reveals that after he learned of Cleopatra's presence in this timeline, he planted hints (including the fake sword) to compel her to find the tablets for him. As they reach the tablet and Cleopatra reads the full prophecy on it, she learns that she is apparently destined to die in her final fight against Octavian, which Khensu knew about. Meanwhile, Antony manages to free himself and the others.

Cleopatra refuses to go back to her own time and thus allow Octavian to win. Octavian shocks her with the revelation that he is her former friend Gozi, made immortal by the Sword of Kebechet. He then tries to kill her, but Zaid sacrifices himself to shield her from the lethal blast. In her fury, Cleopatra manifests her mysterious power again and hits Octavian with a teleportation blast, which sends him to a remote planet, before collapsing from the power drain. After she awakes in the Yasiro Academy's infirmary, she follows her fate connection with the tablets and finds the Uta hidden in the very chamber in which she had arrived. Khepra, who joins her, explains that the Cat Council also knew of the tablets' significance and therefore arranged for Cleopatra to reunite them. She gives Cleopatra the choice of being able to return home, but Cleopatra, feeling guilty of having inadvertendly hurt her friends - including Gozi - decides to stay and continue the fight.

=== Book 4: The Golden Lion ===
One year after her arrival, Cleopatra is summoned before the Cat Council, where she meets Akila's parents Tuluk and Sina, both scientists for P.Y.R.A.M.I.D. She is informed that the Golden Lion, a fallen star which is referenced in the savior prophecy, has been found on the ice moon of Cada'duun. As the immense energy source it is rumored to be, P.Y.R.A.M.I.D. assumes that Octavian will certainly use it to further his conquest plans, and the decision is made to recover it. To her frustration, Cleopatra is forbidden from participating because she was grounded as a consequence of the events on Hykosis. However, after the deliberation is over, Kek, one of the Council members, secretly gives Cleopatra a FTL device which will allow her to reach Cada'duun in time, and she is further equipped by Brian. However, worried that her friends might get endangered again, Cleopatra decides to go off on her own. Elsewhere, Octavian informs his master, Anubis, that he has found the resting place of the Golden Lion; but after his fiasco on Hykosis, Anubis sends one of his minions, Ophois, in his stead.

Right after landing, Cleopatra is attacked by an immature giant ice spider until Antony, who is also after the Golden Lion, happens upon the scene and saves her. Soon afterward, Ophois arrives and attacks them, but is frozen stiff by the brutal cold. A violent snowstorm forces Cleopatra and Antony to take shelter in a cave for the night, and in the course of the flight Cleopatra's as yet unknown new power activates again. The next morning, they are met by a native lifeform, a male snow otter, whom Cleopatra names Mihos. Mihos leads them to a trapped gate, beyond which they are surprised to find an inhabited subterranean oasis. After spending some time recuperating, they discover the Golden Lion in the village's close proximity, which is the source of warmth for this hidden haven.

Just then, Ophois, who has thawed up, and an army of Xerx arrive and attack the village. While Cleopatra, Antony and the villagers defend themselves, Ophois proceeds to the Golden Lion and breaks the rock crust covering it, causing the ground to crack up into a number of plasma-filled clefts. Cleopatra and Antony fight Ophois; Ophois stabs her with his spear, but Cleopatra inexplicably recovers and casts Ophois into the plasma, where he perishes. Then Akila, her parents and the rest of the academy cadets, who have been tracking Cleopatra, arrive and defeat the Xerx.

In the aftermath, it is decided that the Golden Lion should remain at its present location, since its removal would destroy the oasis; Tuluk and Sina stay behind as part of the P.Y.R.A.M.I.D. team studying its properties. Cleopatra expresses a heartfelt apology to her friends for going off on her own and risking her life like this, and later in private Khensu expresses his pride over her efforts and bravery. Antony also leaves, but before they part, Cleopatra kisses him.

Soon afterward, it is revealed that Antony was tasked to find the Golden Lion by Octavius, in return for sparing the orphanage and rescinding the bounty on his head. He delivers a fragment of the Lion in a box, but as soon as he is far enough away, he activates a self-destruct device in the box, setting off the fragment which obliterates Octavian's fleet.

=== Book 5: Fallen Empires ===
In a flashback, a story is told about what happened in Egypt after Cleopatra disappeared into the future. Gozi was rendered immortal by the Sword of Kebechet, and he and Cleopatra's teacher Bakari were imprisoned for "allowing" the princess to disappear. When alien pirates attacked the pharao's capital, he and Bakari were taken as slaves. Years later, when the pirates were themselves attacked, Gozi evacuated Bakari in an escape pod but stayed behind as the ship he was on exploded. He was found by other aliens, who reconstructed his body as one of their own; he built a new life until it was all destroyed by constant warfare, and in his bitter desire for revenge he consigned his soul to Anubis.

Contrary to general assumptions, Octavian has survived the explosion of the star fragment. He is reconstituted by Anubis, who has decided to harness the Golden Lion's power for his own purposes. Octavian launches a sneak attack on Cada'duun, seizing the Golden Lion and cutting off all communications. After using it to construct a powerful weapon, Octavian test-fires it on Hykosis City; Antony has just enough time to evacuate the orphanage before the settlement is destroyed.

On Mayet, P.Y.R.A.M.I.D. prepares the activation of a force shield created by Brian and Councilor Talibath to keep themselves and other planets safe from invasion. In the midst of an announcement at the Yasiro Academy, Cleopatra's mystery power suddenly activates again and renders her unconscious. When she awakens the next day, Brian explains to her and Akila that the power, which he previously assumed to be a side effect of Cleopatra's transit to the future, is something which he has not encountered before. Based on what has happened and an idea by Antony, Cleopatra theorizes that this power acts as a sort of warning system, and concludes that Octavian is not dead and that he may launch an attack soon.

Despite her friends' advice to stay put, Cleopatra leaves the infirmary and runs into the Cat Council and Yosira. Asking to speak with Talibath in private, she informs the councilor of her suspicions, who heeds her warning and promises to check the shield one more time before its launch. Cleopatra attends the activation ceremony, which apparently goes smoothly, but then she is collected by academy security and brought to the shield control center, where Khepra and Kek meet her with Talibath's body and fake evidence that Cleopatra has murdered him.

With Khensu's help, Cleopatra and Akila escape and meet with Brian, concluding that there is a traitor in P.Y.R.A.M.I.D.'s Council and Pharaoh Yosira may be in danger. Cleopatra hatches a plan to infiltrate P.Y.R.A.M.I.D. through its air vent system and spirit Yosira to safety; but while navigating the air ducts, she intercepts a secret conversation between Khepra and Octavian, which involves a deal concerning Cleopatra's surrender in exchange for leaving Ailuros in peace. After transmitting the conversation to Brain, she invades the Pharaoh's quarters, but security is alerted to their presence, and Cleopatra and Akila are captured. But whilst being visited by Khepra and Yosira in the holding area, Yosira and Brian present the recorded secret meeting as evidence of Khepra's treason, which leads to her arrest and her replacement as Administrator by Kek.

In an emergency meeting of the council, news is shared about Octavian's new weapon and that the Xerx fleet has set course for Ailuros, since Octavian's deal with Khepra was voided by her arrest. Feeling a connection to the Golden Lion's power, Cleopatra asks to be allowed to infiltrate the ship it is installed on and destroy it. With the council's permission and Khensu acting as her aide, she boards the vessel, but walks into a trap Octavian set for her. Brian and Akila discover that there is a second traitor - Kek - within P.Y.R.A.M.I.D.; they apprehend and capture him, but not before Kek successfully disables the shield, leaving Ailuros open to attack.

Blaming Cleopatra for his forced immortality and the destruction of Egypt by the alien pirates, Octavian attacks her. Cleopatra taps into the Golden Lion power core on the ship, absorbing its energy and destroying it, but refuses to kill Octavian. The despot knocks her out and puts her inside an airlock, where he gleefully reveals to her that he constructed not just one, but several of these new plasma weapons. One of his other ships bombards Yasiro Academy, but just in time Yosira gives the order to evacuate the school, whose edifices are launched into space. Octavian expels Cleopatra from the ship, but her new power enables her to survive the vacuum until Khensu picks her up. Khepra, who was critically injured during the hasty evacuation, expresses her regrets for the choices she's made to her son before dying.

=== Book 6: Queen of the Nile ===
Six months after Octavian's fateful strike, P.Y.R.A.M.I.D. hurries to Cada'duun to have Cleopatra re-solidify the Golden Lion in order to deprive Octavian of his means of recharging his superweapon. The plan succeeds, but heavy sacrifices are made. This, and the weight of her supposed role as the galaxy's savior, plunges Cleopatra into a deep depression.

Two weeks later, P.Y.R.A.M.I.D. lands on Thonis, a largely barren planet protected by a cloaking shield which is powered by a fragment of the Golden Lion's plasma, secured by Sina and Tuluk, who escaped Octavian's takeover of Cada'duun. The oasis formed by the plasma's radiation has become a shelter for refugees from all over the Nile Galaxy, including Hykosis. When Cleopatra is supposed to give a public speech to encourage the masses, the pressure becomes too much again, and she retreats. When Yosira seeks her out, Cleopatra expresses her self-doubts with a brief manifestation of her power, only to see a similar aura flickering on Yosira's shoulder. But before she can ask about it, Antony and his fellow orphans arrive on Thonis after a small odyssey. Meanwhile, however, Fod Franze, who has also made it to Thonis, learns of Cleopatra's presence and decides to pay her back for his earlier humiliation.

Antony tells Cleopatra, Brian, Khensu and Akila how he came to find her and gives Cleopatra an ancient book which once belonged to Harkhebi. To the startlement of all, it was written by Bakari and contains the original version of the savior prophecy, as well as a personal message to Cleopatra. As Cleopatra reads it, she recites a magic formula, and she, Antony and Brian - who were standing close to her - are transported to Duat, a dark shadow world, where they encounter Thoth, albeit in the shape of a gorilla instead of an ibis-headed man. Thoth takes the trio to a black pyramid, where they briefly see another Cleopatra meeting a strange girl, who turns into a snake and bites her before the other Cleopatra vanishes in a flash.

Then the girl turns around, and as she looks into Cleopatra's eyes, another flash occurs, and Cleopatra finds herself, the girl and Thoth on a tiny island under a dark, starless sky: The universe at the end of all existence. Thoth explains that his former fellow god Anubis is the true driving force behind Octavian's conquests, as he has possessed Gozi. Anubis seeks revenge for his beloved daughter Kebechet, whom he had tasked with the cleansing of the souls of the dead. Since her new office entailed that she could be exploited by mortals to gain immortality, he gave her a sword which would banish a soul wounded by it into the nothingness of his realm if she was ever threatened. But Kebechet fell in love with a human prince, and eventually his thirst for immortality overcame his love, and he killed Kebechet with her own sword. In his fury, Anubis possessed the prince and proceeded to lay waste to all life in the universe. The other gods, including Thoth himself, stood up against Anubis and lost their lives defeating him; with his dying strength, Ra enclosed Anubis within the sword, which was placed along with the Ata and Uta in the tomb which Cleopatra and Gozi discovered, and then transferred his essence into a dying star, which became the Golden Lion, in order to provide a weapon to combat Anubis, should he ever return.

Thoth also discloses that he sent messages to Bakari about Anubis' possible return and Cleopatra's role in vanquishing him through his dreams, which the old teacher recorded as the savior's prophecy, and that Kebechet and the prince had a daughter (the mysterious girl), who became Cleopatra's ancestor and used her power to create the tablets which brought Cleopatra to the future. This last statement makes Cleopatra realize that Yosira is her own descendant and thus also as much destined for the role of the savior as she is. Determined to help, she demands that Thoth send her back; Thoth warns her that if she intervenes, her memory of the future will be lost if she succeeds unless she receives a tether linked to both time periods, and if she dies, Yosira will also cease to exist. Still resolute, Cleopatra has Kebechet's daughter send her back to the black pyramid, where she collects Antony and Brian. As soon as the girls are gone, Thoth, a mere shadow of his former self, dissipates.

On Thonis, Fod Franze frees Kek from prison. Kek steals the cloaking shield's plasma core, exposing Thonis to Octavian, who has tracked P.Y.R.A.M.I.D. down; then he tries to assassinate Yosira, who survives, and surrenders the plasma core to Octavius. When Franze fails to produce Cleopatra, Octavian kills him and sends his Xerx out for her. P.Y.R.A.M.I.D. and the academy students fight back; their bravery triggers Yosira's determination, causing her to activate her inherited divine power for the first time and destroy part of Octavian's army. Cleopatra, Antony and Brian return just in time to help, and her reappearance inspires the refugees to aid the academy cadets in their fight.

Cleopatra storms off to confront Octavian, and is soon joined by Akila (armed with the Golden Lion's plasma in her new cybernetic arm), Yosira and Antony, who distract Octavian long enough for Cleopatra to grab the Sword of Kebechet and kill Octavian with it. Anubis possesses Cleopatra, but this gives Yosira a spiritual link to join her power with Cleopatra's and that of Kebechet's daughter, and thus finally annihilate Anubis. While Yosira is hailed as the new Queen of the Nile, the discharge hurls Cleopatra back to the past, to the point of time when the space pirates had attacked her home and kidnapped Gozi and Bakkari. At that moment, just as Thoth predicted, her memories of the future fade, but right after they're gone, Antony suddenly appears, and his presence makes her remember again. Antony tells how Khensu and Yosira found a way to use the Uta tablet to send him back to Cleopatra's original timeline (thereby not revealing to him that he would be destined to become Cleopatra's husband), although the tablet broke in transit.

With her regained knowledge of the future, her powers and Antony's help, Cleopatra rewrites Earth's history, with Egypt replacing Rome as the dominant civilization of antiquity (and thereby explaining the influence of Egyptian culture on the far future). In said future timeline, Cleopatra is still revered as the Savior of the Nile and sorely missed by Akila, Brian and Khensu, when Cleopatra, after having repaired the Uta tablet, suddenly appears before them for a joyous reunion.

== Adaptations ==
The graphic novels were adapted into an eponymous animated television series by DreamWorks Animation; the series was first broadcast in Southeast Asia on DreamWorks Channel beginning on 25 November 2019, and was released in the United States on Peacock, which launched on 15 April 2020, to certain customers. Maihack would help produce the TV series.

== Reception ==
Reviews of Maihack's comics have been generally positive. J. Caleb Mozzocco, in School Library Journal, described Target Practice as having an art style with a "touch of anime/manga influence" along with other cartoonist styles, resulting in a clean, simple, and inviting looking to pages, which is well suited for various characters, settings, and technologies, while adding that Cleopatra is a likable character in these comics as a "kick-butt, teen girl heroine." Rich Clabaugh, a staff writer for The Christian Science Monitor built on this, reviewing the same book, writing that they were pleased to see a "strong, spunky female main comic character that will appeal to both girls and boys" and called Maihack a skilled artist who can breathe a "vibrant life into his characters, human, alien, and cat." Robert Greenberger was more critical but still admitted that Maihack is a talented and "clever storyteller" who uses an "expressive and a restrained color palette." Maihack's other comics were also reviewed positively, some calling Secret of the Time Tablets an all ages "sci-fi series full of pizzazz, high energy, and lots of questions to answer" and The Golden Lion as having beautiful illustrations, complete with a "terrific cast of characters that continue to evolve."

Apart from this, others called Maihack's comics "a rollicking all-ages adventure," and involving a "series of Star Trek–style space adventures punctuated with far-future high school drama." On 11 September 2020, Daniel Toy described Target Practice on CNN's Underscored an "action-packed journey through space and time that will excite any young reader" and called the rest of the series "out of this world."
