= Eden Wood =

American actress and television personality (born 2005)

- Born: February 18, 2005 (age 21); Arkansas
- Occupation: Actress
- Years active: 2009–present

Eden Wood (born February 18, 2005) is an American actress. She is known for her role as Darla in The Little Rascals Save the Day, and her many appearances on the reality television show Toddlers & Tiaras.

== Filmography ==
Year	Title	Role	Notes
2010	Jimmy Paul: The Pug Tooth Fairy	Pinky	
2012	The Eric Andre Show	Herself	Episode: "Evangelos"
2014	The Little Rascals Save the Day	Darla	Direct-to-video film
2018	Generation Wealth	Herself	

== Personal life ==
Wood is an only child. Her mother, Mickie Wood, had her at age 40 and appeared on screen with her in Toddlers & Tiaras.
