= Wendell & Vinnie =

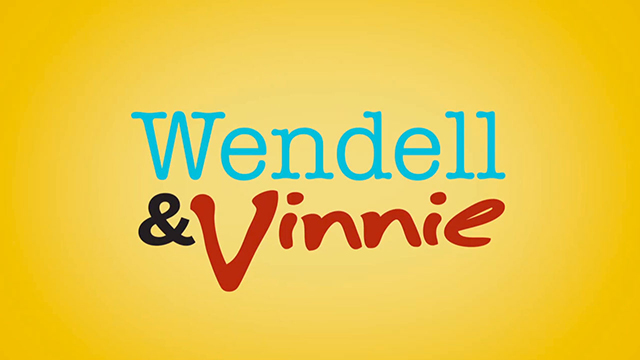
- Genre: Sitcom
- Created by: Jay Kogen
- Starring: Jerry Trainor; Buddy Handleson; Nicole Sullivan; Haley Strode
- Theme music composer: Mauli B Mateo Laboriel
- Opening theme: "Never Felt So Good"
- Country of origin: United States
- Original language: English
- No. of seasons: 1
- No. of episodes: 20

Production
- Executive producers: Jay Kogen; Aaron Kaplan
- Producers: Jerry Trainor; Matt Fleckenstein; Richard G. King
- Production locations: Warner Bros. Studios; Burbank, California
- Running time: 23 minutes
- Production companies: Passable Entertainment; Kapital Entertainment; Nickelodeon Productions

Original release
- Network: Nickelodeon (episodes 1–14); Nick at Nite (episodes 15–20)
- Release: February 16 – September 22, 2013

Wendell & Vinnie is an American television sitcom that aired on Nickelodeon from February 16, 2013, to September 22, 2013. The series stars Jerry Trainor and Buddy Handleson. The first official trailer for the show was released on December 21, 2012. On August 15, 2013, the series was cancelled after one season.

== Premise ==
Vinnie is the owner of a pop culture memorabilia store and lives in Los Angeles without a care in the world. After his brother and sister-in-law suddenly die six months before the setting of the show, Vinnie finds himself as the legal guardian of his wise-beyond-his-years nephew, Wendell. With a little help from Vinnie's sister, Wilma, and his next-door neighbor, Taryn, Vinnie gets the hang of being a parent. At the same time, Wendell finds himself trying to keep his immature uncle under control.

== Cast and characters ==
- Jerry Trainor as Vinnie Bassett, the uncle of Wendell. He is considered to be a manchild, even saying in one episode, "I know what 12-year-old boys like 'cause I've been one for 20 years!" He runs a pop culture memorabilia business, and is fond of video games, comic books, and eating junk food. He realizes that he was given custody of Wendell because Wendell's parents wanted to give Vinnie a chance and knew that Wendell is making his way no matter where he lives.
- Buddy Handleson as Wendell Bassett, an intelligent 12-year-old who has a number of hobbies. His parents died six months before the events of the series, as a result, he lives with his uncle Vinnie. He is stereotypically nerdy and does not have many friends. He enjoys magic tricks and homework.
- Nicole Sullivan as Wilma Bassett, Vinnie's older sister, Wendell's aunt, and personal injury attorney. She does not understand why Wendell's parents left Vinnie in charge and wants to be Wendell's legal guardian for herself. She often tries to get men to date her, even if it means she must be dishonest.
- Haley Strode as Taryn Kleinberg, the beautiful recently divorced new neighbor of Wendell and Vinnie and close friend of the two. She comes from Houston, Texas. Vinnie was originally attracted to her but she rejected him after Vinnie stopped asking her out he asks out someone else and she said yes. In the series finale, Taryn noticed that she loves Vinnie and shares a kiss with him but then Vinnie tells her that he's involved with someone else.
- Angelique Terrazas as Lacy, Wendell's best friend whom he met in detention. She threatened him at first, but then she revealed that she is not really mean, but just wanted to look tough in front of her friends. She sometimes gets Wendell into trouble—Wendell's grandfather considers her a bad influence - but Wendell still likes her. She enjoys eating corn dogs. It is revealed that Vinnie is in a scrapbook club with Lacy's grandmother.

== Production ==
On August 2, 2012, Nick at Nite announced that Wendell & Vinnie had been picked up for 20 episodes. However, on February 7, 2013, it was announced that it would premiere on Nick instead. Writing and filming of Wendell & Vinnie began in late 2011/early 2012 at Warner Brothers Studios, and the show had its first official trailer on December 21, 2012. It premiered on February 16, 2013.

== Episodes ==
The series was cancelled by Nickelodeon on August 15, 2013. After the cancellation, the final six episodes aired on Nick at Nite on Sunday nights.

No.	Title	Directed by	Written by	Original release date	Prod. code	U.S. viewers (millions)
Nickelodeon
1	"Vinnie & Wendell"	John Fortenberry	Jay Kogen	February 16, 2013	101	2.34
Vinnie is a guardian of his twelve-year-old nephew Wendell. Vinnie tries to ask his new neighbor Taryn out, but she refuses. When Wendell is bullied in school because of his intellectual appearance, Vinnie tries to help him be more popular by teaching him to ride a skateboard. But at the park, Vinnie gets distracted while talking to Taryn, and Wendell gets hurt. Wilma comes to the hospital to visit her nephew. Social Services comes to the apartment investigate the accident and to determine whether Vinnie is a good guardian. Taryn helps him to prepare and cook dinner, but they make kung pao chicken, which has peanuts, to which Wendell is allergic. He has to go to the hospital again. The inspector from Social Services Department sees the reports of twelve recent visits to the emergency room, and wants to take Wendell away from Vinnie and give him over to Wilma's care, but they all three inform him that Vinnie had been the patient for the earlier visits. Vinnie remains Wendell's guardian.
2	"Rule Breakers & Date Makers"	Adam Weissman	Matt Fleckenstein	February 23, 2013	106	2.38
When Vinnie learns that Wendell's vice principal has a thing for fathers of troubled children, he convinces Wendell to get in trouble in order to get closer to her. However, Wendell gets detention for his efforts and meets a tough and savvy girl named Lacy.
3	"Mock Law & Order"	John Fortenberry	Steven James Meyer	March 2, 2013	102	2.31
Wendell faces off against Lacy in a mock trial and Wilma acts as co-counsel, facing off against her rival. Their case is jeopardized, however, when Vinnie dates Wilma's rival and he leaks their defense.
4	"Abra & Cadabra"	Victor Gonzalez	Andrew Hill Newman	March 9, 2013	109	2.38
When Wendell wants to become an amateur magician, Vinnie is afraid that Wendell will fail, as he did.
5	"Valentine's & the Cultural Experience"	Rob Schiller	Steve Skrovan	March 16, 2013	105	2.10
Valentine's Day has everyone scrambling for a date. Wendell seeks to share a cupcake with a classmate while Vinnie tries to make a connection with Taryn.
6	"Big Dogs & Bicycles"	Leonard R. Garner, Jr.	Steve Skrovan	March 30, 2013	110	1.40
Wilma and Vinnie convinces Wendell to participate in the school fundraiser to join the family tradition of salesmanship. However, their efforts reignite their sibling rivalry and jeopardizes Wendell's friendship with Lacy.
7	"Wendell & The Sleepover"	Rob Schiller	Susan Beavers	April 6, 2013	104	1.64
Hosting a sleepover proves challenging when instead of helping Wendell make new friends, Vinnie takes over and becomes the center of attention. In the end, Wendell proves he also knows a little bit about how to have a party.
8	"Baseball & Bad Dates"	Jon Rosenbaum	Harry Hannigan	May 2, 2013	103	1.56
Vinnie wants to teach Wendell to love baseball but is dismayed when Wendell defies family tradition and becomes a Yankees fan instead of a Dodgers fan. Note: This episode was originally meant to air on April 20, 2013 but was rescheduled due to unknown reasons. Some websites incorrectly list it as S01E10. This was the first new episode to air on a Thursday rather than Saturday.
9	"Fathers Of Fathers & Sons"	Victor Gonzalez	Susan Beavers	May 9, 2013	114	1.46
Vinnie's father believes that Lacy is a bad influence on Wendell, so he tells him to tell Wendell to make some other friends, but they end up being jerks.
10	"Pick Ups & Drop Offs"	Rob Schiller	Harry Hannigan	May 16, 2013	117	1.32
Wendell and Vinnie try to join a swanky car pool at school, but their test run doesn't go smoothly. Elsewhere, Wilma persuades Taryn to file a lawsuit against a beverage corporation.
11	"The Dutch & Us"	Victor Gonzalez	Elliott Owen	May 23, 2013	108	1.46
Wendell bonds with a new Dutch student, who then ditches Wendell for the popular kids. However, Vinnie finds a way to reunite the two of them.
12	"Sick & Tired"	Rob Schiller	Matt Fleckenstein	May 30, 2013	115	1.12
Vinnie feels guilty for shirking his responsibility of watching a sick Wendell.
13	"Lost & Found"	Jay Kogen	Allan Rice	June 6, 2013	118	1.35
The guys find a tote bag and try to locate its owner, but Wendell underestimates Vinnie's detective skills.
14	"Swindle & Vinnie"	Victor Gonzalez	Jay Kogen	June 13, 2013	120	1.32
The guys have a twist and Wendell ends up selling one of Vinnie's most beloved collectibles for an unreasonably low price, hoping to get his uncle angry with him. However, Vinnie is just disappointed and Wendell feels sorry for his actions. He tries to get the collectible back, but it seems like swindling is the only way.
Nick at Nite
15	"Vinnie & The Toad"	Rob Schiller	Shawn Simmons	August 18, 2013	111	1.10
Vinnie meets up with an old friend the toad, who attempts to get them tickets to Vinnie's hero Jack White. Meanwhile, Wilma takes care of Wendell. Note: This episode premiered in June 2013 on Nickelodeon UK.
16	"Vinnie & The Man Crush"	Leonard R. Garner, Jr.	Laurie Parres	August 25, 2013	113	0.76
The irresponsible uncle pushes Wendell to hang out with a comic-book writer's son. While the boys become firm friends, Vinnie gets bored of his hero's company.
17	"Of Mothers & Gardens"	Adam Weissman	Max Burnett	September 1, 2013	107	0.77
Wendell asks Vinnie for help convincing the PTA to build a school garden, and Vinnie soon discovers PTA politics. Vinnie and Wilma help him fulfil his dream. Note: This episode premiered in June 2013 on Nickelodeon UK.
18	"Smart Girls & Dumb Guys"	Rob Schiller	Chuck Hayward	September 8, 2013	112	0.97
Vinnie uses Wendell's talking points to impress a woman; Vinnie asks Wendell to pretend that everything in the apartment belongs to him.
19	"Wendell's & Vinnie's"	Victor Gonzalez	Shawn Simmons	September 15, 2013	119	0.74
The boy genius goes to work with his uncle - but ends up making the shop a less enjoyable place to hang out in.
20	"First Dances & Last Chances"	Rob Schiller	Max Burnett & Andrew Hill Newman	September 22, 2013	116	0.64
Wendell becomes head of the dance committee and enlists Vinnie and Wilma's help to make it successful; Vinnie reconnects with a former crush.

== International broadcast ==
Country	Channel	Release date	Title in Country
United States	Nickelodeon; Nick at Nite	February 16, 2013	Wendell & Vinnie
United Kingdom	Nickelodeon	June 10, 2013	Wendell & Vinnie
Canada	YTV	August 12, 2013	Wendell & Vinnie
Australia	Nickelodeon	September 3, 2013	Wendell & Vinnie
Brazil	Nickelodeon; Rede Bandeirantes	December 9, 2013; January 3, 2015	Wendell & Vinnie
Russia	Nickelodeon	2013	История Венделла и Винни (English translation: The Tales of Wendell and Vinnie)
NLD; BEL	Nickelodeon	October 14, 2013	
South Africa	Nickelodeon	January 26, 2014	Wendell & Vinnie
Germany	Nickelodeon	October 4, 2014	Wendell & Vinnie
Croatia	Comedy Central Extra	2013	Wendell & Vinnie

== Reception ==
Common Sense Media gave the show 2 out of 5 stars, saying "Lackluster sitcom has mixed messages about parenting".
