= Rio Mangini =

American actor and pianist

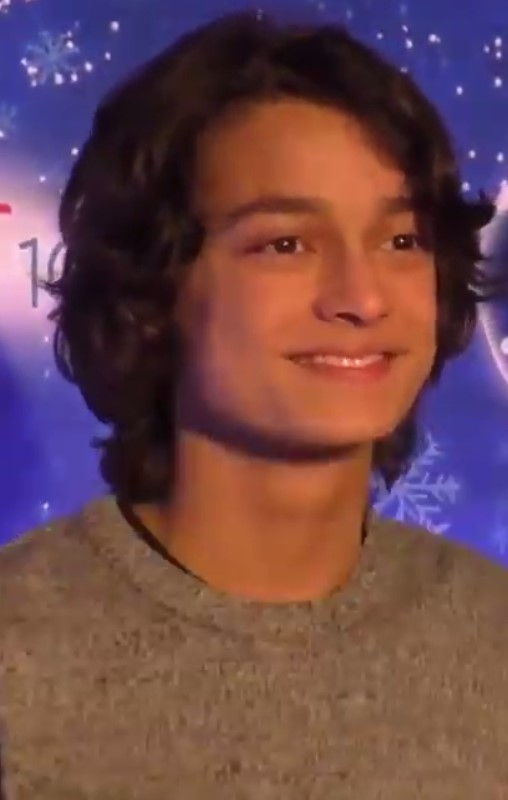
- Mangini in 2016
- Born: October 6, 2002 (age 23); California, U.S
- Occupation: Actor
- Years active: 2012–present
- Father: Mark Mangini

Rio Mangini (born October 6, 2002) is an American actor, musician, and composer. He is known for his roles as Ace McFumbles in Bella and the Bulldogs and as McQuaid in Everything Sucks!

== Life and career ==
Rio Mangini is the son of Academy Award-winning sound editor Mark Mangini. His father is of Italian descent. His mother is of Māori and German descent.

Mangini is a pianist. He placed first in the 2011 Cypress College Competition (8-year-old division) and received an honorable mention in the 2011 American Protege International Piano Strings Competition. As a pianist, he was awarded by Young Artist Awards in 2012 with a special award in the category "Outstanding Instrumentalist".

In 2012, Mangini starred as Jax in Lisanne Sartor's short film Six Letter Word. The film made it through the Emerging Filmmaker Showcase in 2013 to the Cannes Film Festival. In 2013, he appeared in various films and television projects including The Garcias Have Landed, Marvin Marvin, What If, and Kickin' It. In 2014, Mangini appeared in Good Luck Charlie, Switched at Birth, Doc McStuffins, and See Dad Run. He also appeared in the films Pizza Bear Delivery Challenge, The Little Rascals Save the Day, and Finders Keepers. He appeared in One Crazy Cruise, Miles from Tomorrowland, and Bella and the Bulldogs in 2015, Teen Wolf in 2016, and General Hospital in 2017.

In 2018, Mangini appeared in Lethal Weapon and Just Add Magic and starred in the Netflix comedy-drama series Everything Sucks! as McQuaid. He is set to star in Reach, as well as compose and perform music for the film.

== Filmography ==
Television and film roles
Year	Title	Role	Notes
2012	Six Letter Word	Jax	Short film
2013	Marvin Marvin	Tom	Episode: "Battle of the Bands"
2013	What If	Young David / Grandpa / Kid	3 episodes
2013	The Garcias Have Landed	Felix Garcia	Television movie
2013	Kickin' It	Sam	5 episodes
2013	Pizza Bear Delivery Challenge	Judah	Short film
2014	Good Luck Charlie	Matt	Episode: "Good Bye Charlie"
2014	Switched at Birth	Sammy	Episode: "Dance Me to the End of Love"
2014	The Little Rascals Save the Day	Woim	Film
2014	Doc McStuffins	Ian	"Crikey! It's Wildlife Will!/Rootin' Tootin' Southwest Sal" episode
2014	Finders Keepers	Dylan	Television movie
2014	See Dad Run	Carlos	2 episodes
2015–2017	Miles from Tomorrowland	Rygan	4 episodes
2015	One Crazy Cruise	Cameron Jensen-Bauer	Television movie
2015–2016	Bella and the Bulldogs	Ace McFumbles	28 episodes
2015	Nickelodeon's Ho Ho Holiday Special	Snowflake	Television movie
2016	Lasso & Comet	Lasso	Short film
2016	Teen Wolf	Alex	Episode: "Memory Lost"
2017	Bitch	Max Hart	Film
2017	The Imbalancing Act	Theo	Short film
2017	General Hospital	Oscar Nero	2 episodes
2017	Super	Roy	Short film
2018	Lethal Weapon	Nunes	Episode: "Funny Money"
2018	Just Add Magic	Oren	Episode: "Just Add RJ"
2018	Everything Sucks!	McQuaid	Main role
2018	Guess Who Died	Jeff	Television movie
2018	Reach	Leo	Film
2018	Relish	Theo	Film
2020–2021	Home Before Dark	Ethan	8 episodes
2023	Wolf Pack	Austin	Recurring role
2025	The Rookie	Andy Mersh	Episode: "The Mickey"
2025	9-1-1	Parker Straiton	3 episodes
2026	Street Smart	Heroji	Film

== Accolades ==
Young Artist Awards

Year	Nominee / work	Award	Result
2012	Rio Mangini	Special Award–Outstanding Instrumentalist	Won
2014	Kickin' It	Best Performance in a TV Series (Recurring Young Actor 10 and Under)	Won
2015	Good Luck Charlie	Best Performance in a TV Series (Guest Starring Young Actor 11–14)	Won
2016	One Crazy Cruise	Best Performance in a TV Movie, Miniseries, Special or Pilot (Young Actor)	Nominated
2016	Bella and the Bulldogs	Best Performance in a TV Series (Recurring Young Actor 13 and Under)	Won
2017	Teen Wolf	Best Performance in a TV Series (Guest Starring Teen Actor)	Won
2017	Lasso and Comet	Best Performance in a Voice-Over Role (Young Actor 12–21)	Nominated
2017	Bella and the Bulldogs	Best Performance in a TV series (Recurring Teen Actor)	Nominated

Young Entertainer Awards

Year	Nominee / work	Award	Result
2016	One Lazy Cruise	Best Leading Young Actor (Television Movie, Mini Series or Special)	Won
2017	Bella and the Bulldogs	Best Supporting Young Actor (Television Series)	Won
2017	Teen Wolf	Best Guest Starring Young Actor (Television Series)	Nominated
2017	Lasso & Comet	Best Young Actor (Voice Over Role)	Nominated
