= Lilimar Hernandez =

American actress (born 2000)

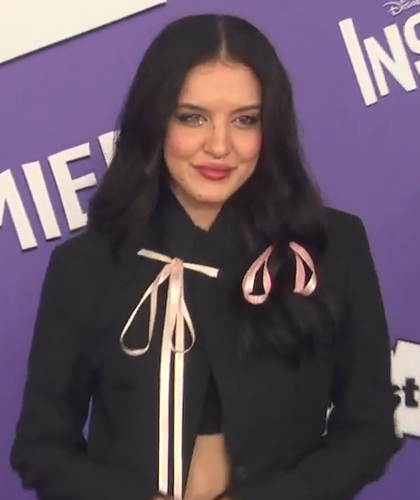
- Hernandez in 2024
- Born: June 2, 2000 (age 26); Margarita Island, Venezuela
- Other name: Lilimar
- Occupation: Actress
- Years active: 2006–present

Lilimar Hernandez (born June 2, 2000), also known mononymously as Lilimar, is an American actress. She is known for her roles as Sophie in the 2015–2016 Nickelodeon television series Bella and the Bulldogs, as Sage in the 2018–2019 Nickelodeon television series Knight Squad, and as the titular protagonist of the Peacock animated television series Cleopatra in Space, which she called her "first big show".

== Early life ==
Hernandez was born in Margarita Island, Venezuela, to Cuban parents. She moved to Miami with her family when she was six years old, and began taking acting classes at the age of nine. Since she got her role in Bella and the Bulldogs, she lives in Los Angeles with her grandmother and with her mother, Mayte.

Hernandez has heterochromia, with her left eye being brown and her right eye being green/hazel.

== Career ==
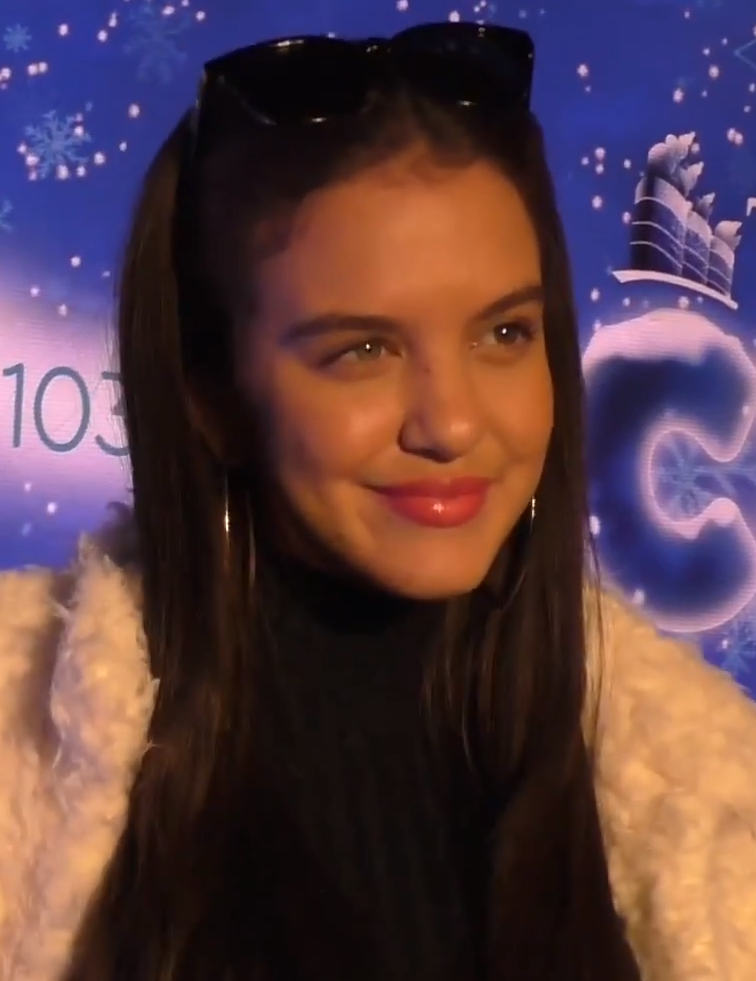
Hernandez in 2016

At age 14, Hernandez starred in the short film Pedro Pan depicting Operation Peter Pan, which relocated more than 14,000 Cuban children to the United States from 1960 to 1962. Her first major role was as Sophie in the 2015–2016 Nickelodeon television series Bella and the Bulldogs. In 2017 she joined the cast of the 2018–2019 Nickelodeon series Knight Squad. In 2019 she was cast in the lead role of Cleopatra in the Peacock animated series Cleopatra in Space, for which she also sings the theme song.

== Filmography ==
Television roles
Year	Title	Role	Notes	Ref.
2006	Sábado Gigante	Herself	Children's section	
2013	Rosario	Elenita	Episode 1.1	
2014	Smart Alec	Beth	Unsold television pilot	
2015–2016	Bella and the Bulldogs	Sophie	Main role; as Lilimar	
2017	Life after First Failure	Isabella	Web series	
2018	School of Rock	Erika	Episode: "Not Afraid"	
2018–2019	Knight Squad	Sage	Main role; as Lilimar	
2018	Spirit Riding Free	Solana	Voice, 5 episodes	
2020–2021	Cleopatra in Space	Cleopatra	Lead voice role	
2020	Group Chat with Jayden & Brent	Herself	Episode: "Halloween – Sliming For Apples"	
2021	Side Hustle	Buckles	2 episodes	
2021	Country Comfort	Maria	2 episodes	
2022	Baymax!	Sofia	Voice, 2 episodes	
2022–present	Batwheels	Batwing	Main voice role	
2025	Harley Quinn	Sophia	Voice role, season 5	
2025	The Thundermans: Undercover	Kitty Claw	Episode: "Not So Fast and Furious"	
2025	Bugs Bunny Builders	Pepper Polar Bear	Voice; episode: "Polar Plunge"	
TBA	Darkwing Duck	Duckie	Main voice role	

Film roles
Year	Title	Role	Notes	Ref.
2013	The Little Ghost	Marie	Voice; English dub	
2020	Hubie Halloween	Coco	Direct-to-streaming film	
2024	Inside Out 2	Valentina "Val" Ortiz	Voice	

Video game roles
Year	Title	Role	Notes	Ref.
2021	Guilty Gear -STRIVE-	Giovanna	English dub	
2025	Star Wars: Beyond Victory	Luuda	Motion capture	

== Awards and nominations ==
Year	Award	Category	Nominated work	Result	Ref.
2015	30th Annual Imagen Awards	Best Young Actress – Television	Bella and the Bulldogs	Won	
