= Buddy Handleson =

American actor (born 1999)

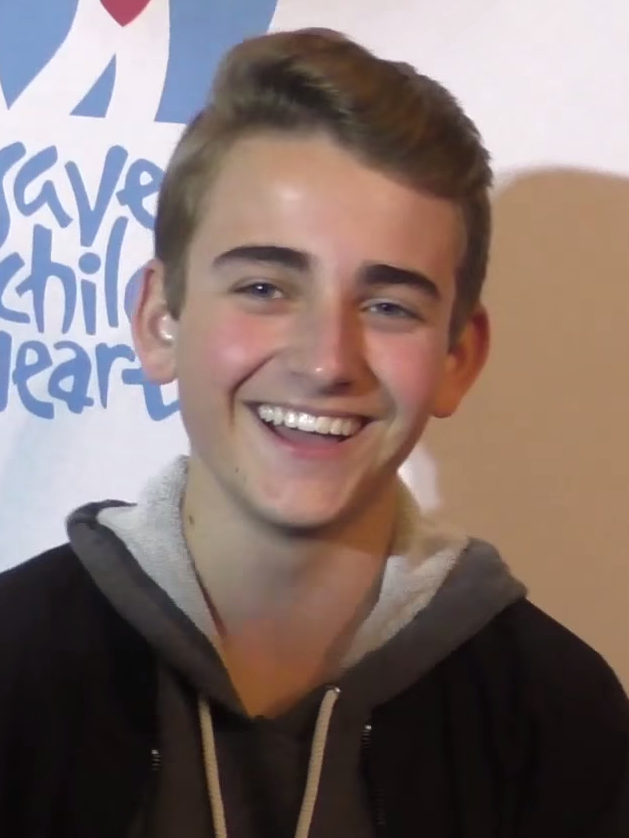
- Handleson in 2016
- Born: November 1, 1999 (age 26); Danville, California, U.S.
- Other name: Buddy Keaton
- Occupation: Actor
- Years active: 2006–present

Buddy Handleson (born November 1, 1999) is an American actor, best known for playing Henry Dillon in Disney Teen sitcom Shake It Up, Wendell Bassett in Nickelodeon comedy series Wendell & Vinnie, and Newt on Bella and the Bulldogs, also on Nickelodeon.

== Early life and career ==
Buddy is the son of Jay and Athena (née Poulos) Handleson. He has an older sister named Brooke (b. 1998). At the age of 3, his parents tried to introduce him to modeling, but the young Buddy Handleson did not like it. He was spotted by the talent agent Cathy Steele based in Orlando.

He started auditioning for acting roles at the age of 7 and taking acting lessons with Romeo Marquez. In 2010, he co-starred in an episode of 'Til Death, and guest-starred in an episode of Sons of Tucson (role of Gabe AKA "Asskiss" in episode Kisses and Beads). In February 2013, he landed the lead role of Wendell Bassett in Wendell and Vinnie.

== Filmography ==
Television and film roles
Year	Title	Role	Notes
2009	Hannah Montana	Boy	Episode: "Jake... Another Little Piece of My Heart"
2009	Trauma	Lost Boy Jonah	Episode: "Masquerade"
2010	'Til Death	Timmy	Episode: "Dog Fight"
2010	Sons of Tucson	Gabe	Episodes: "Golden Ticket", "Kisses and Beads"
2010–2012	Shake It Up	Henry Dillon	Recurring role, 9 episodes
2011	Mr. Sunshine	Timmy	Episodes: "Lingerie Football", "Family Business"
2011	Coming & Going	Christopher Crump	Film
2012	Doc McStuffins	Luca	Voice role
2012	Bad Fairy	Rocco DiRizzo	TV movie
2013	Wendell & Vinnie	Wendell Bassett	Lead role
2014	Little Savages	Vinny	Film
2015–2016	Bella and the Bulldogs	Newt	Main role
2017–2018	Nicky, Ricky, Dicky & Dawn	Wally	Episodes: "Quadpendence Day", "We'll Always Have Parasites"
2019	Sydney to the Max	Gerald	Episode: "The Parent Track"
2024	DL Guy	Cameron	Short

== Personal life ==
Handleson lived in Burbank with his mother in 2012 until they moved to Redondo Beach, California in 2014.

On June 25, 2017, Handleson came out as gay through a caption on an Instagram photo depicting him in front of a pride flag. He wrote, "Over the past couple of years I've become more and more comfortable with my sexuality and I think I'm ready to share it with the world. I'm finally at a place in life where I can say 'I'm proud of who I am. I'm proud to be gay.'"
