= Hats Off (1927 film) =

1927 film

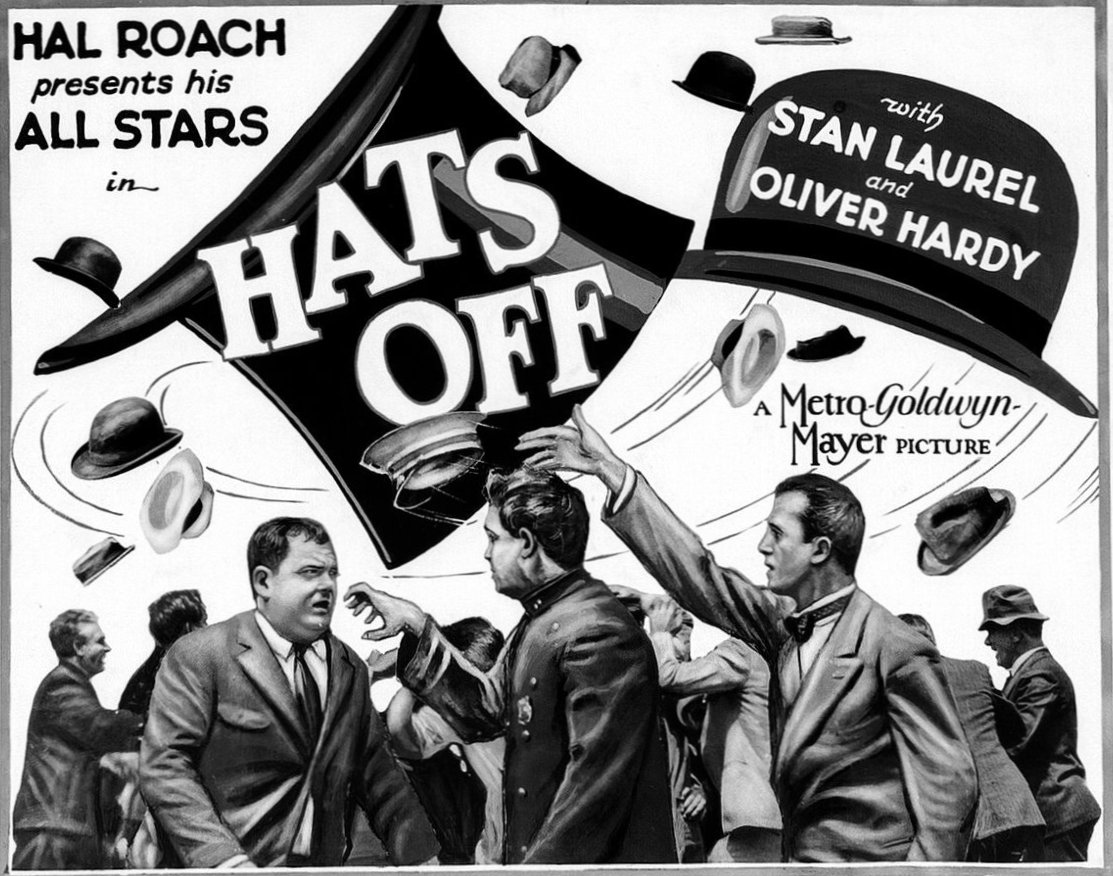
- Lobby poster
- Directed by: Hal Yates
- Written by: H. M. Walker
- Produced by: Hal Roach
- Starring: Stan Laurel; Oliver Hardy; James Finlayson; Anita Garvin
- Cinematography: George Stevens
- Edited by: Richard C. Currier
- Distributed by: Metro-Goldwyn-Mayer
- Release date: November 5, 1927
- Running time: 20 minutes
- Country: United States
- Languages: Silent film English intertitles

Hats Off is a 1927 lost silent short film starring Laurel and Hardy.

== Plot ==
Stan and Ollie are salesmen attempting to sell a washing machine; they fail constantly after several near misses. One would-be sale has them carrying the machine up a large flight of steps, only to find out that a young lady wants them to post a letter for her. The boys later get into an argument knocking off each other's hats, which eventually involves scores of others. A police van eventually carts all those involved away except Stan and Ollie, who afterwards try to find their own headgear amongst the hundreds of others lying on the street.

== Cast ==
- Stan Laurel as Stan
- Oliver Hardy as Ollie
- Anita Garvin as Customer at top of stairs
- Jimmy Finlayson as Proprietor, Kwickway Washing Machine Co.
- Dorothy Coburn as Vision
- Chet Brandenburg as Pedestrian #1
- Sam Lufkin as Pedestrian #2
- Ham Kinsey as Pedestrian #2

== Preservation status ==
Hats Off was an enormous success when first released, which made considerable headway in establishing the Laurel and Hardy team with the public. After being last publicly shown in Germany in 1930, Hats Off disappeared and is now considered a lost film. Laurel and Hardy historian Randy Skretvedt dubbed Hats Off the "Holy Grail of Laurel and Hardy movies."

== Notes ==
- Hats Off was remade by Laurel and Hardy as The Music Box (1932), utilizing the same flight of steps in the Silver Lake district of Los Angeles. While a washing machine was delivered in Hats Off, a piano would be delivered in The Music Box.
- The long staircase used by The Three Stooges in their 1941 film An Ache in Every Stake (147 steps in length) is approximately two miles northeast, located at 2212 Edendale Place in the Silver Lake district of Los Angeles.
- Hats Off was remade by the same director (Hal Yates) in 1945 as It's Your Move, starring Edgar Kennedy, but utilizing a different staircase although located in the same vicinity where the "Music Box Steps" are in Silver Lake (known as the Descanso Stairs, they are situated at the intersection of Descanso and Larissa Drives, specifically between the residences of 3217 Descanso Dr. and 3200–3206 Larissa Dr. and one block from Sunset Blvd. which can be seen in the background in several long shots).

== See also ==
- List of lost films
