= You're Darn Tootin' =

1928 film

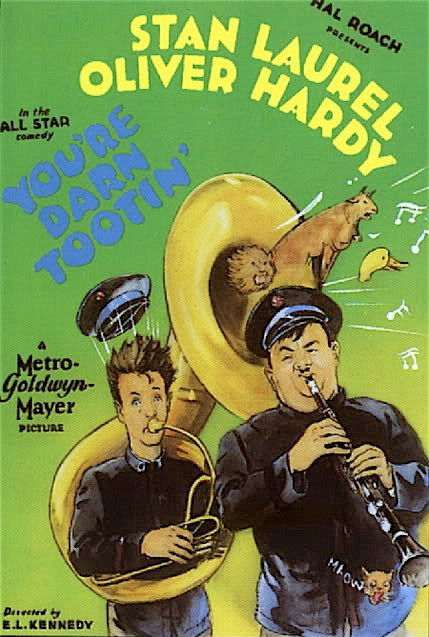
- Directed by: E. L. Kennedy
- Written by: H.M. Walker (titles)
- Produced by: Hal Roach
- Starring: Stan Laurel; Oliver Hardy; Otto Lederer; Charlie Hall; Wilson Benge; Ham Kinsey; William Irving; Agnes Steele; Dick Gilbert; Christian J. Frank; Rolfe Sedan; Chet Brandenburg; George Rowe; Sam Lufkin
- Cinematography: Floyd Jackman
- Edited by: Richard C. Currier
- Distributed by: Metro-Goldwyn-Mayer
- Release date: April 21, 1928
- Running time: 21:29
- Country: United States
- Languages: Silent film English (Original intertitles)

The full film

You're Darn Tootin' is a silent short subject directed by E. Livingston Kennedy starring comedy duo Laurel and Hardy. It was released on April 21, 1928, by Metro-Goldwyn-Mayer.

== Plot ==
Stan and Oliver are members of a municipal band. They are incapable of following their temperamental conductor's direction, and their disruption of a performance leads to their dismissal from the band. When their landlady learns that the pair, already in arrears, is unemployed, she evicts them from their lodgings. In an attempt to earn a living, they resort to street performance as musicians. However, passersby are indifferent if not hostile to their performance, and they are harassed by a police officer. Their constant arguments culminate in the destruction of both their instruments and a physical altercation that spills over into their interactions with passersby. The melee escalates until the street is filled with men ripping each other's pants off.

== Cast ==
- Stan Laurel as Stanley
- Oliver Hardy as Ollie
- Otto Lederer as Bandleader
- Charlie Hall, Wilson Benge, Ham Kinsey, William Irving - fellow musicians
- Agnes Steele as Landlady
- Dick Gilbert as Boarder
- Christian J. Frank as Policeman
- Rolfe Sedan as Drunk
- Chet Brandenburg as Manhole worker
- George Rowe as Pedestrian
- Sam Lufkin as Man in Restaurant

== Production notes ==
You're Darn Tootin' was filmed in January 1928. The title is an American idiomatic phrase akin to "You're darn right!" The film was originally released in the UK under its working title The Music Blasters. The film was directed by fellow film comedian Edgar Kennedy (billed as "E. Livingston Kennedy").

Scenes from You're Darn Tootin' were included in several silent film compilations of the 1960s produced by Robert Youngson.

The film was shown on the BBC Four programme Paul Merton's Silent Clowns in full with an original, unique musical score.

== Reception ==
Laurel and Hardy: The Magic Behind the Movies author Randy Skretvedt wrote positively about You're Darn Tootin', saying the film "is the first clear statement of the essential idea inherent in Laurel and Hardy. The world is not their oyster: they are the pearls trapped in the oyster. Their jobs hang by rapidly unraveling threads. Their possessions crumble into dust. Their dreams die just at the point of fruition. Their dignity is assaulted constantly. At times they can't live with each other, but they'll never be able to live without each other. Each other is all they will ever have. That, and the hope for a better day – which is about the most profound philosophical statement ever to come from a two-reel comedy."

British film critic Leslie Halliwell commented, "...though early in their teaming [it] shows Stan and Ollie at their best in a salt shaker routine and in a surreal pants-ripping contest."

The Laurel & Hardy Encyclopedia' author Glenn Mitchell contrasts the expanding-mayhem finale with earlier scenes, saying the film "contains what is in many respects the best of Laurel & Hardy's huge street battles. So good is this climactic sequence that other sections tend to be ignored: the opening bandstand segment is timed to a musical beat...."

Bruce Calvert of Allmovie commented that the film "is famous for the pants-ripping scene at the end, but the other parts of it are just as funny.... The final pants-ripping scene is not funny just because so many men lose their pants, but because Laurel and Hardy come up with inventive ways to pull more innocent bystanders into the fray."

Writing in the 1960s, The Films of Laurel and Hardy author William K. Everson appraised the film, saying "The boarding house [dinner] is a charming sequence with Hardy's fruitless efforts to charm and cajole the landlady.... The shin-kicking, pants-ripping finale is one of their best and most meticulously constructed sequences of controlled savagery, similar to and in many ways better than the great pie fight [of The Battle of the Century]."

== The Sons of the Desert ==
Chapters, called Tents, of The Sons of the Desert, the international Laurel and Hardy Appreciation Society, all take their names from L&H films; the You're Darn Tootin' Tent is in Mobile, Alabama.
