= The Finishing Touch =

1928 silent comedy film

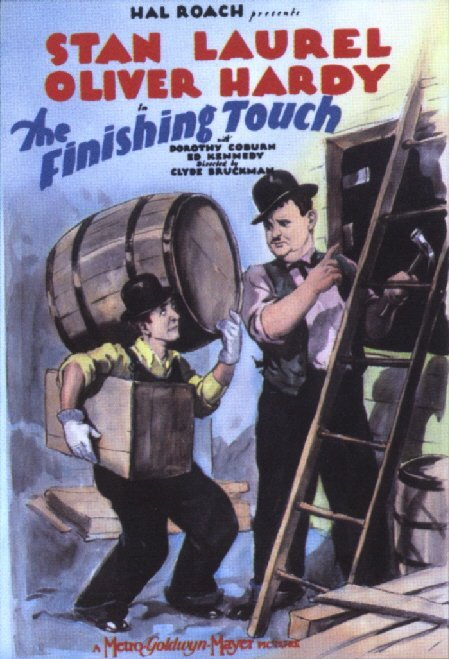
- Directed by: Clyde Bruckman; Leo McCarey (supervising)
- Written by: H.M. Walker
- Produced by: Hal Roach
- Starring: Stan Laurel; Oliver Hardy; Dorothy Coburn; Edgar Kennedy; Sam Lufkin
- Cinematography: George Stevens
- Distributed by: Metro-Goldwyn-Mayer
- Release date: February 25, 1928
- Running time: 19 minutes
- Country: United States
- Languages: Silent film; English intertitles

The Finishing Touch is a 1928 short comedy silent film produced by Hal Roach, directed by Clyde Bruckman, and starring Laurel and Hardy. It was released on February 25, 1928, by Metro-Goldwyn-Mayer.

== Plot ==
Stan and Ollie are contracted by a homeowner to expedite the construction of his residence, with the promise of a $500 incentive for timely completion. Despite their earnest efforts, the duo encounters a series of mishaps, exacerbated by the interference of a nearby hospital's head nurse, who enlists a policeman to enforce noise regulations. The policeman becomes the target of various misfortunes, including being struck by a bucket of glue and a stack of shingles.

When construction of the house is completed, the homeowner initially expresses satisfaction and compensates Stan and Ollie accordingly. However, their triumph is short-lived when a minor incident involving a bird leads to the chimney's collapse, compromising the structural integrity of the entire dwelling. Infuriated, the homeowner demands the return of the $500 bonus. Stan and Ollie, unwilling to relinquish their earnings, engage in resourceful tactics to retain the disputed funds.

== Cast ==
- Stan Laurel as Stan
- Oliver Hardy as Ollie
- Ed Kennedy as The Cop
- Dorothy Coburn as The Nurse
- Sam Lufkin as The Homeowner

== Production and exhibition ==
The Finishing Touch was filmed in November and December 1927. The film is a descendant of two of the duo's solo films: Laurel's Smithy (1924) and Hardy's Stick Around (1925). The paperhanger character played by Hardy in the latter film "was justly important to [Hardy], originating an embryonic form of his eventual screen character."

The Finishing Touch is set in an area undergoing real estate development in 1927; its wide open spaces provide a sense of a more pastoral Los Angeles that would soon vanish as more structures filled it in. The ill-fated structure in question was built by the Roach construction team on Motor Avenue near the Fox studio. It was supposed to collapse completely when the duo's truck rolled through it, but an overzealous crew ignored designer Thomas Benton Roberts's design specifications and made it too sturdy — so the truck lodged halfway through and ground to a stop.

The Finishing Touch was filmed on location in the neighborhood of Cheviot Hills, Los Angeles. The house under construction in the film was located at 2830 Motor Avenue and was destroyed after filming. The hospital scene was filmed at 2728 McConnell Drive, at a house that still stands today. Additionally, several other houses in Cheviot Hills can be seen in the background, most prominently 2839 Forrester Drive.

=== Script into film ===
L&H historian Randy Skretvedt unearthed the original action script for The Finishing Touch and discovered gags that were either unfilmed or unused in the finished picture. One gag finds Stan and Ollie in adjacent rooms: Ollie drives a nail into the wall to hang his coat, but in the next room, the nail snags Stan's sleeve, so he drives it back out. On his side of the wall, Ollie cannot figure out why his coat is on the floor, but he has his suspicions. Just as he steps into Stan's room to confront him, Stan has stepped into his through another door. The nail gets hammered back and forth until it ultimately hits pay dirt — in the beleaguered hide of cop Kennedy.

The script also provided additional backstory on how the duo came to be hired to work on the house: an unfilmed scene portrayed the original construction crew having the same difficulties with the same folks from the same nearby hospital and quitting in frustration. Another change from the script was definitely an improvement: by the time the cameras rolled, the stern male physician of the script had morphed into the petite but spicy nurse played by Dorothy Coburn. Her spirited domination of both The Boys and Kennedy is made all the funnier by her gender and small stature. She makes up in spunk what she lacks in body mass — Skretvedt calls her "the quintessential tough-cookie."

The picture's finale also evolved between script and screen. In the final film, a dainty animated bird alights on the chimney, triggering a domino-effect collapse of the entire house. On the printed page, Stan himself was to be the catalyst for the implosion: he left his derby on the roof, and when he clambers up to get it, the catastrophic sequence commences. As different items tremble and fall, the homeowner takes back more of the money he has paid them until he has taken all of it back.

=== Differing versions ===
Glenn Mitchell has noted that The Finishing Touch is one of the few Laurel and Hardy silents with both British and American versions extant today. In an era when primitive film stocks did not permit many generations of copies to be made from a master, producers often set up multiple cameras while shooting to obtain more first-generation elements to work with. These extra negatives often became prints for foreign markets. They sometimes had slightly different angles or variations in action or cutting. Mitchell writes:

In The Finishing Touch, this is most obvious in the close-ups of the nurse, which in the British version are presented from a different perspective and with some dissimilar facial reactions to the American equivalent. An amendment in subtitling tells us that nine years of schooling took Laurel and Hardy to the 'First Reader' for American audiences, and the 'Infants' for the British.

Today's American edition, he writes, originates from the Blackhawk Films master and combines footage from both versions.

== Reception ==
The Finishing Touch is considered a prototype film for Laurel and Hardy. It was the first of their "workingman" pictures, where their professional task itself becomes the backbone of the plot. Films such as Dirty Work, Busy Bodies, and The Music Box all descend from The Finishing Touch.

Glenn Mitchell, author of The Laurel & Hardy Encyclopedia, commented, "The Finishing Touch is enjoyable despite an over-reliance on slapstick. One ingenious sight gag [is when] Stan appears to be supporting both ends of a lengthy piece of timber." William K. Everson, author of The Films of Laurel and Hardy, delivered a mixed review in 1967, stating, "Considering the promise it offers, The Finishing Touch is a slight disappointment. The climactic gags lack the force and 'boff' quality that the build-up has led us to expect, and the whole short has a somewhat mechanical flavor to it. Nevertheless, it has energy, and the problems of house construction... provide every gag with anticipation as well as culmination." Janiss Garza of AllMovie said, "This two-reel Laurel and Hardy silent is especially rich in slapstick.... This silly little film doesn't have much plot to speak of, but it's so well constructed, and the humor is so solid, it doesn't matter." Randy Skretvedt, author of Laurel and Hardy: The Magic Behind the Movies, is more guarded in his assessment, saying, "If The Finishing Touch isn't as memorable as the films which preceded it, it's a pleasant enough little picture." British film critic Leslie Halliwell commented, "Excellent early star slapstick with predictable but enjoyable gags."
