= Should Married Men Go Home? =

1928 film

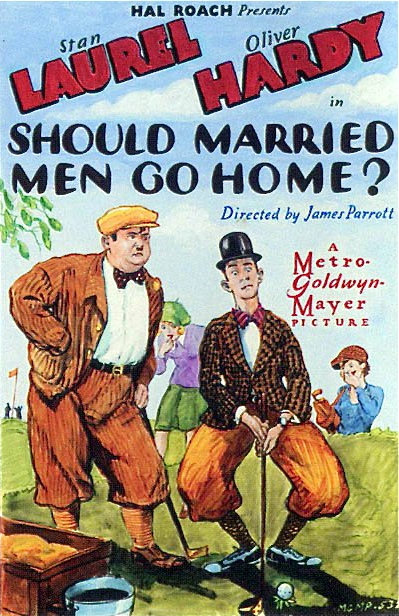
- Directed by: Leo McCarey; James Parrott
- Written by: Leo McCarey; James Parrott; H.M. Walker
- Produced by: Hal Roach
- Starring: Stan Laurel; Oliver Hardy; Kay Deslys; Edna Marion; Viola Richard; Charlie Hall; Edgar Kennedy; John Aasen; Chet Brandenburg; Dorothy Coburn; Jack Hill; Sam Lufkin; Lyle Tayo
- Cinematography: George Stevens
- Edited by: Richard C. Currier
- Distributed by: Metro-Goldwyn-Mayer
- Release date: September 8, 1928
- Running time: 20:29
- Country: United States
- Languages: Silent film English intertitles

Should Married Men Go Home? is a silent short subject co-directed by Leo McCarey and James Parrott, starring comedy duo Laurel and Hardy. It was the first Hal Roach film to bill Laurel and Hardy as a team. Previous appearances together were billed under the Roach "All-Star Comedy" banner. It was released by Metro-Goldwyn-Mayer on September 8, 1928. McCarey is also one of the script writers for the film.

The film entered the public domain in the United States in 2024.

The film

== Plot ==
Ollie and his wife are enjoying a quiet Sunday at home until Stan shows up, eager to play golf. After Stan breaks the chair, the blind, and almost sets fire to their house, and Oliver breaks the Hardys' Victrola, Mrs. Hardy chases the boys out. At the golf course, they are partnered with a pair of young women to complete a foursome. The girls want to be treated to sodas, but the boys are short of money. Stan leaves his watch to settle the thirty-cent bill. On the course, they tangle with rude golfer Edgar Kennedy, and end up in a mud-throwing battle with several other linksters.

== Cast ==
Credited
- Stan Laurel as Stan
- Oliver Hardy as Ollie

Uncredited

- Kay Deslys as Mrs. Hardy
- Edna Marion as Blonde Girlfriend
- Viola Richard as Brunette Girlfriend
- Charlie Hall as Soda Jerk
- Edgar Kennedy as Golfer
- John Aasen as Very Tall Golfer
- Chet Brandenburg as Caddy
- Dorothy Coburn as Muddy Combatant
- Jack Hill as Muddy Combatant
- Sam Lufkin as Shop Manager
- Lyle Tayo as Lady Golfer

== Production notes ==
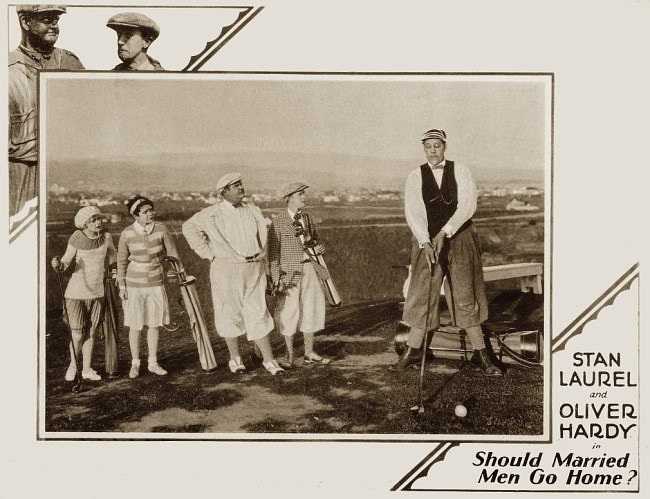
1928 Lobby card highlighting the presence of 8-foot-9 actor John Aasen.

Should Married Men Go Home? was filmed in March and May 1928. On-location footage has recently surfaced on YouTube. The film's working title was Follow Through.

7-foot-1 actor John Aasen appears as "Very Tall Golfer".

The soda fountain routine was reworked during the sound era in the film Men O' War, with Jimmy Finlayson assuming the role inhabited by Charlie Hall.

The gag of Stan slipping a note under the door, only to see it get pulled further in from the inside where the Hardys are hiding from him, was reused during the sound era in Come Clean (1931) when the Hardys again pretend not to be home when the Laurels are calling.

Several oil derricks from the Los Angeles City Oil Field are visible during golf course scenes.

The lag time between the primary filming in March and the September release of Should Married Men Go Home? was unusually long. When the company reconvened in Los Angeles in Autumn 1928, the fame and popularity of the Laurel and Hardy team had grown.

== Reception ==
British film critic Leslie Halliwell gave the film a mediocre reception, saying the "preliminary domestic scene is the funniest." The Films of Laurel and Hardy author William K. Everson wrote in 1967 that the film was "one of the best of the ‘forgotten’ Laurel and Hardy films, Should Married Men Go Home? admittedly overlaps with several other of their films but is no less funny because of it." He cites Ollie's collapsing of the front fence, the soda fountain routine and Edgar Kennedy's toupee woes as high spots.
