= Leave 'Em Laughing =

1928 film

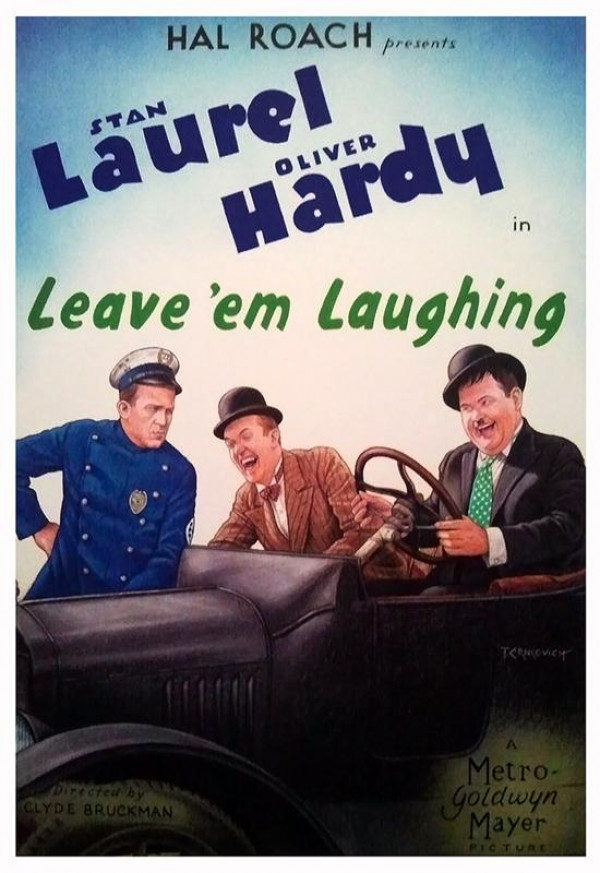
- Theatrical release poster
- Directed by: Clyde Bruckman
- Written by: Reed Heustis; Hal Roach
- Produced by: Hal Roach
- Starring: Stan Laurel; Oliver Hardy; Charlie Hall; Edgar Kennedy; Dorothy Coburn; Viola Richard; Edgar Dearing; Al Hallett; Sam Lufkin; Tiny Sandford; Otto Fries; Jack Lloyd; Jack Hill
- Cinematography: George Stevens
- Edited by: Richard C. Currier
- Music by: Evie Greene
- Distributed by: Metro-Goldwyn-Mayer
- Release date: January 28, 1928
- Running time: 21:48 (2-reels)
- Languages: Silent film English (Original intertitles)

Leave 'Em Laughing is a 1928 two-reel silent film starring Stan Laurel and Oliver Hardy. Produced by the Hal Roach Studios, it was shot in October 1927 and released January 28, 1928 by Metro-Goldwyn-Mayer.

== Plot ==
Stan cannot sleep owing to a painful toothache. Ollie, attempting to aid Stan, retrieves a hot-water bottle from the bathroom but repeatedly steps on a tack on the floor. Subsequently, a mishap occurs as the water bottle lid loosens, resulting in water spilling onto the bed. This disturbance prompts their landlord to intervene, issuing an ultimatum for their eviction the following morning. A physical altercation ensues between the duo and the landlord, culminating in the latter's apparent fall down the stairs.

The next day finds Stan seeking dental treatment for his toothache. However, his fear causes him to resist the dentist. In a turn of events, Ollie accidentally becomes the recipient of the dental procedure intended for Stan. When Ollie awakens from the effect of the nitrous oxide gas, he administers the same gas to Stan, but too liberally, rendering them both unconscious. The effects of the gas extend to the dental staff as well.

Upon regaining consciousness, Stan and Ollie exit the dental office, still under the influence of the gas, resulting in uncontrollable laughter. This sets the stage for a chaotic sequence involving their impaired driving, leading to a series of mishaps at a bustling intersection. Their encounters include a confrontation with a traffic police officer, resulting in a scuffle, and an attempt by the officer to transport them to jail, culminating in the immersion of their vehicle into an open sewer.

== Cast ==
- Stan Laurel as Stan
- Oliver Hardy as Ollie
- Charlie Hall as Landlord
- Edgar Kennedy as Cop
- Dorothy Coburn, Viola Richard as Nurses
- Edgar Dearing, Al Hallett, Sam Lufkin, Tiny Sandford as Dental patients
- Otto Fries as Burly Dentist
- Jack Lloyd as Dentist
- Jack Hill as Irate Motorist

== Production notes ==
Leave 'Em Laughing marks the first appearance of Edgar Kennedy in a Laurel and Hardy film.

Chapters of The Sons of the Desert (the international Laurel and Hardy Appreciation Society) take their names from the duo's films. Leave 'Em Laughing chapters are currently located in Bridgeport, Connecticut, the Twin Cities, Minnesota and Jacksonville, Florida.

Leave 'Em Laughing was remade by The Three Stooges as I Can Hardly Wait (1943).
