= From Soup to Nuts =

1928 film

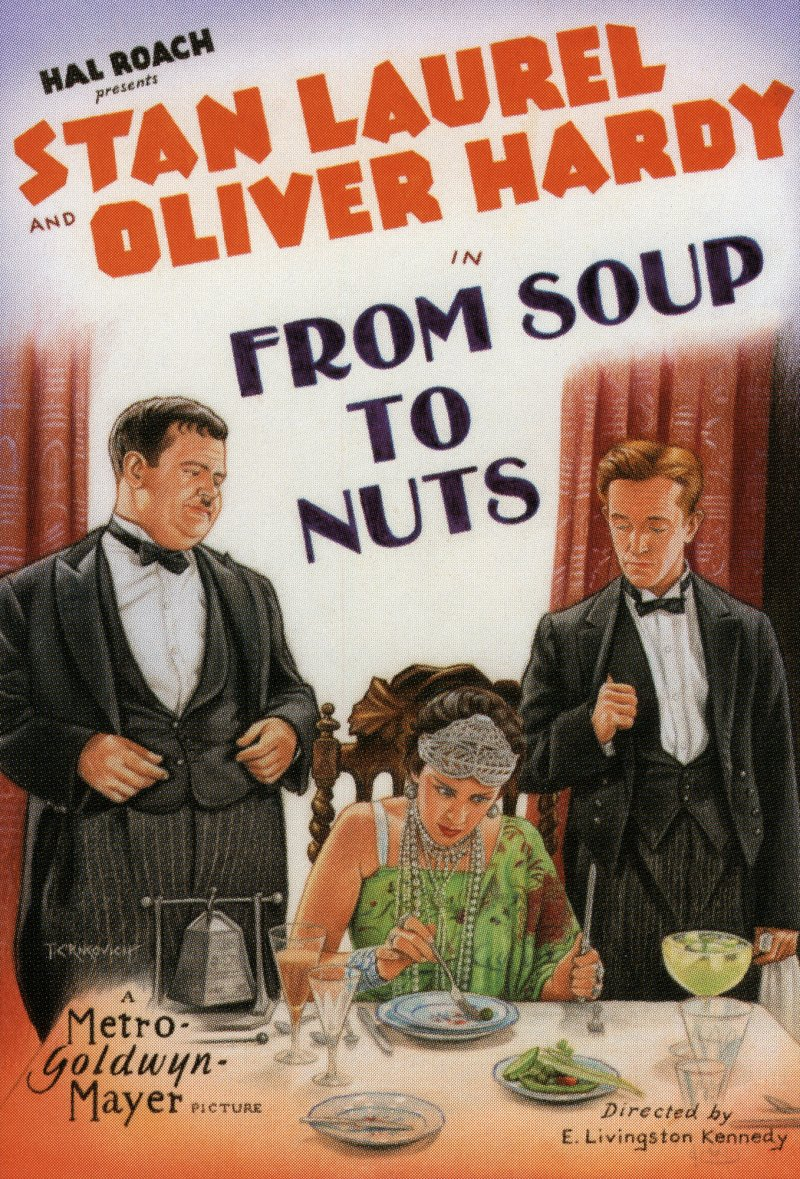
- Directed by: E. Livingston Kennedy
- Written by: Leo McCarey; H. M. Walker
- Produced by: Hal Roach
- Starring: Stan Laurel; Oliver Hardy; Dorothy Coburn; Buddy the Dog; Otto Fries; Anita Garvin; Sam Lufkin; Edna Marion; Gene Morgan; Tiny Sandford; Ellinor Vanderveer
- Cinematography: Len Powers
- Edited by: Richard C. Currier
- Distributed by: Metro-Goldwyn-Mayer
- Release date: March 24, 1928
- Running time: 18:41
- Country: United States
- Languages: Silent film English (Original intertitles)

From Soup to Nuts is a silent short subject directed by E. Livingston Kennedy starring comedy duo Laurel and Hardy. It was released on March 24, 1928, by Metro-Goldwyn-Mayer.

== Plot ==
Stan and Ollie are hired as waiters at an upper class dinner party, with Ollie taking charge before entering the property. The maid shows them inside, where Stan puts their personal card on table with a collection of others. Visible on their card is the slogan, “All we ask is a chance”. A small fight breaks out between Ollie and Stan as a result of Ollie trying to keep Stan from putting his hat on inside the house.

After the wife of the household inspects them she gets shown a notice apologizing that the only available waiters were the duo, where it is revealed on the paper that their previous experience in waiting was at railroad eating houses. Ollie comments to the wife's husband that she is “some wiggler!” and naturally, the husband is not impressed.

The pair get ready to start work in the kitchen where Stan tells the chef (who is busy cooking) not to wear his hat. Stan takes it off him several times but the chef keeps putting it back on. Stan soon loses his cool and throws the chef's hat away. The chef retaliates by grabbing the nearest plate and smashing it over Stan's head. Stan does the same to the chef and they carry on using plates as weapons until Ollie calms things down by stopping Stan from destroying a large, expensive looking plate. However, as Ollie walks off, he trips on the kitchen floor and smashes the plate, causing him to be embarrassed by the onlooking maid.

Meanwhile, the party goes on, oblivious to the impending disaster awaiting them. The wife of the household is not having an easy time either, as she struggles to eat her fruit cocktail with the cutlery provided. Her predicament carries on throughout the film. Stan and Ollie come into the room as they are about to start serving food. Stan manages to pour, what looks like soup, onto Ollie's foot while he counts the guests. Ollie begins carrying a very large cake to the table but slips on a banana skin left by the family dog and lands head first into the cake. Ollie manages to do this more than once in the film, much to the bemusement of the guests, and of Stan, who accuses Ollie of falling over on purpose at one point.

The pair spend most of the film falling down while trying to serve the food, much to the anger of the husband of the household. This is one of the first films to show Stan getting cross for once, as he loses his temper with Ollie's incompetence and with the guests.

The wife then asks Ollie to serve the salad “undressed”. Ollie tells Stan to do this who, confused, heads to the kitchen to tell the maid what he has to do. The maid says, “I always serve it that way...”. Stan cannot believe this but goes ahead and dresses down to his underwear to serve the salad. The film ends with the husband and wife discovering Stan undressed, and after a futile attempt by Ollie to put a jacket on Stan and ask, “How's that - perfect?”, Ollie gets hit by the wife and falls into yet another cake.

== Cast ==
- Stan Laurel - Mr. Laurel
- Oliver Hardy - Mr. Hardy
- Anita Garvin - Mrs. Culpepper
- Tiny Sandford - Mr. Culpepper
- Otto Fries - Chef
- Edna Marion - Agnes the Maid
- Dorothy Coburn - Dinner Guest
- Sam Lufkin - Dinner Guest
- Gene Morgan - Dinner Guest
- Ellinor Vanderveer - Dinner Guest

== Production notes ==
From Soup to Nuts was remade as the first 20 minutes of Laurel & Hardy's 1940 feature film A Chump at Oxford.
