= The Music Box =

1932 short film by James Parrott

- Lobby card, 1932
- Directed by: James Parrott
- Written by: H. M. Walker
- Produced by: Hal Roach
- Starring: Stan Laurel; Oliver Hardy
- Cinematography: Len Powers; Walter Lundin
- Edited by: Richard C. Currier
- Music by: Harry Graham; Marvin Hatley; Leroy Shield
- Distributed by: Metro-Goldwyn-Mayer
- Release date: April 16, 1932 (US)
- Running time: 29:16
- Country: United States
- Language: English

The Music Box is a Laurel and Hardy short film comedy released in 1932. It was directed by James Parrott, produced by Hal Roach and distributed by Metro-Goldwyn-Mayer. The film, which depicts the pair attempting to move a piano up a long flight of steps, won the first Academy Award for Best Live Action Short (Comedy) in 1932. In 1997, it was selected for preservation in the National Film Registry by the Library of Congress as being "culturally, historically, or aesthetically significant". The film is widely seen as the most iconic Laurel and Hardy short, with the featured stairs becoming a popular tourist attraction.

== Plot ==
In a music store, a woman arranges for the purchase and delivery of a player piano as a birthday surprise for her husband. Upon disclosing her address at 1127 Walnut Avenue to the store manager, the Laurel and Hardy Transfer Company ("foundered 1931") is enlisted to transport the instrument using their horse-drawn freight wagon.

Encountering a formidable challenge in the form of a lengthy stairway leading to the residence, the duo attempts to navigate the piano up the steps. Amidst their arduous efforts, they inadvertently cause the instrument to descend the stairs multiple times, resulting in a series of mishaps and encounters with various individuals, including a nursemaid, a policeman, and the imposing Professor Theodore von Schwartzenhoffen. Remaining persistent, Laurel and Hardy eventually succeed in reaching the top, only to face further misfortune as the piano rolls back down, dragging Ollie along. After carrying the piano to the top again, they are told a simpler route is available, so they carry the piano all the way back down in order to drive it up. Despite finding no one there, they get the instrument into the house, making a mess of the living room in the process.

Their struggles culminate in a confrontation with the irate Professor von Schwartzenhoffen, who resides at the address. Infuriated by the mess and the piano, an instrument he detests, he destroys it with an axe just as his wife returns. Upon learning he was the piano's intended recipient, the professor regrets his actions and agrees to sign for the delivery. A final mishap involving an ink-spraying pen causes him to lose his temper once more, prompting Laurel and Hardy to hastily depart while the former shouts at them.

== Cast ==
- Stan Laurel as Stan
- Oliver Hardy as Ollie

Uncredited cast

- Billy Gilbert as Professor Theodore von Schwartzenhoffen, M.D., A.D., D.D.S., F.L.D., F.F.F.und F.
- Hazel Howell as Mrs. von Schwartzenhoffen
- Sam Lufkin as police officer
- Lilyan Irene as nursemaid
- Charlie Hall as postman
- William Gillespie as piano salesman

== Location ==
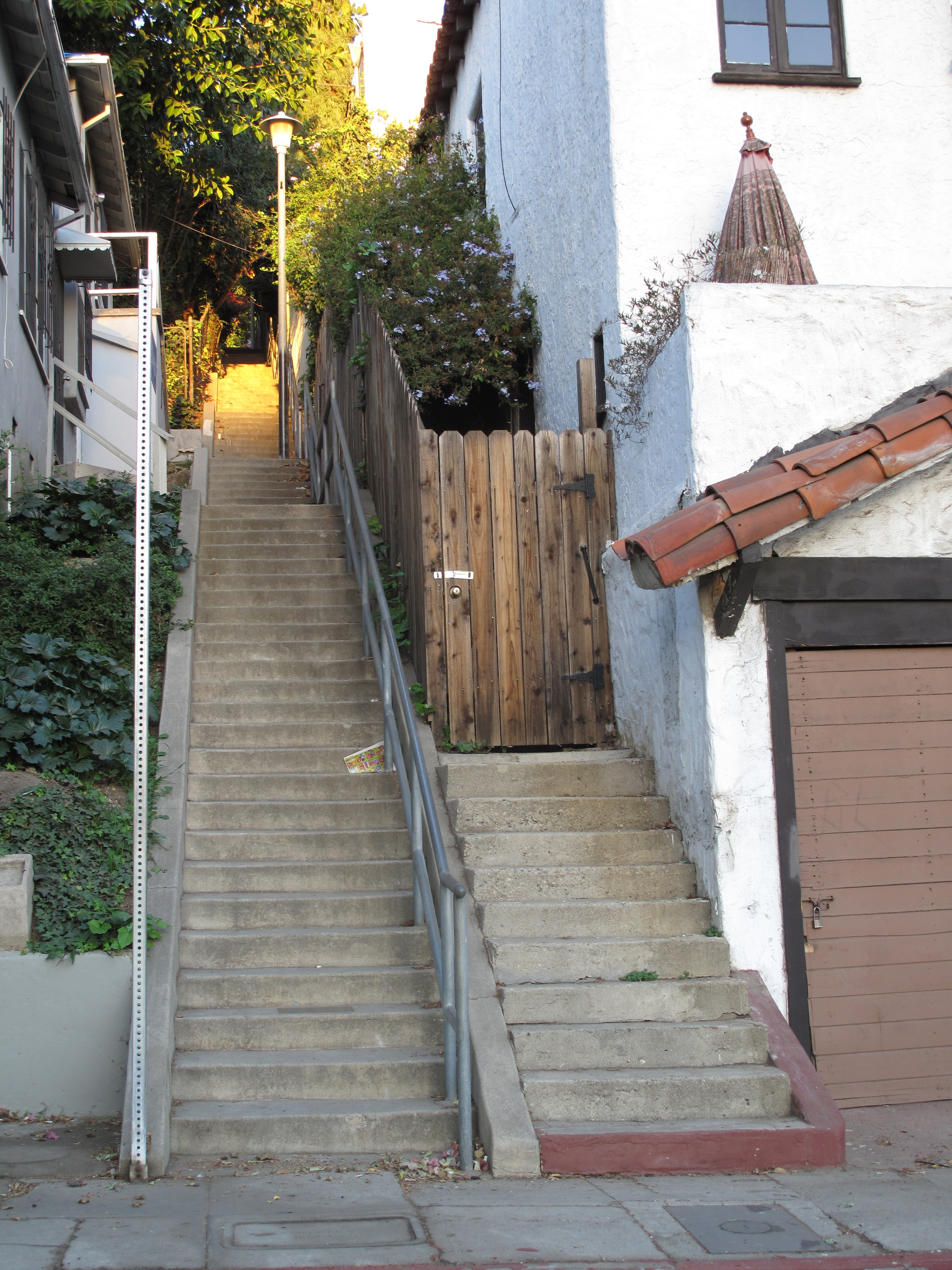
The stairs in 2009

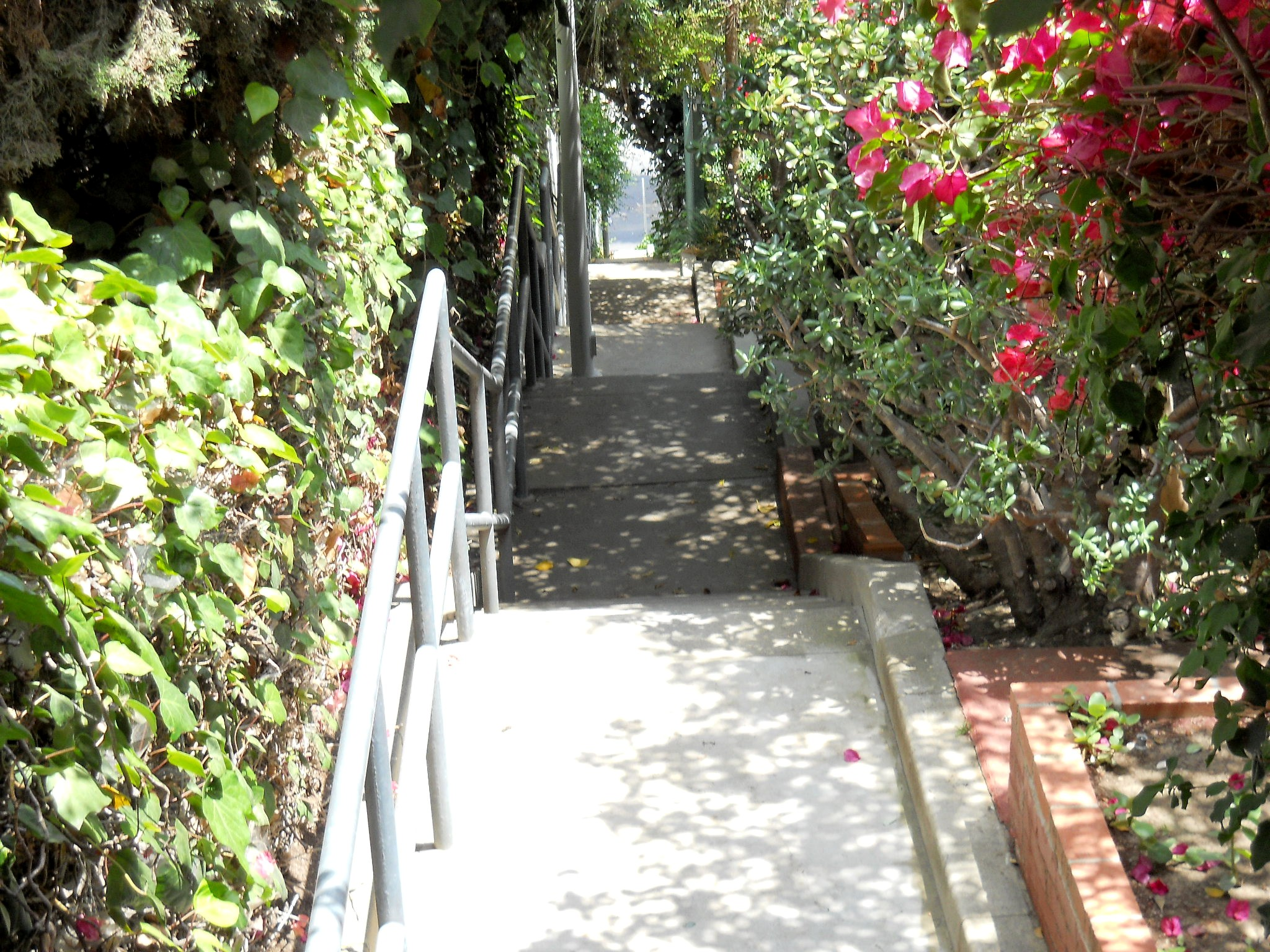
Downward view, 2010

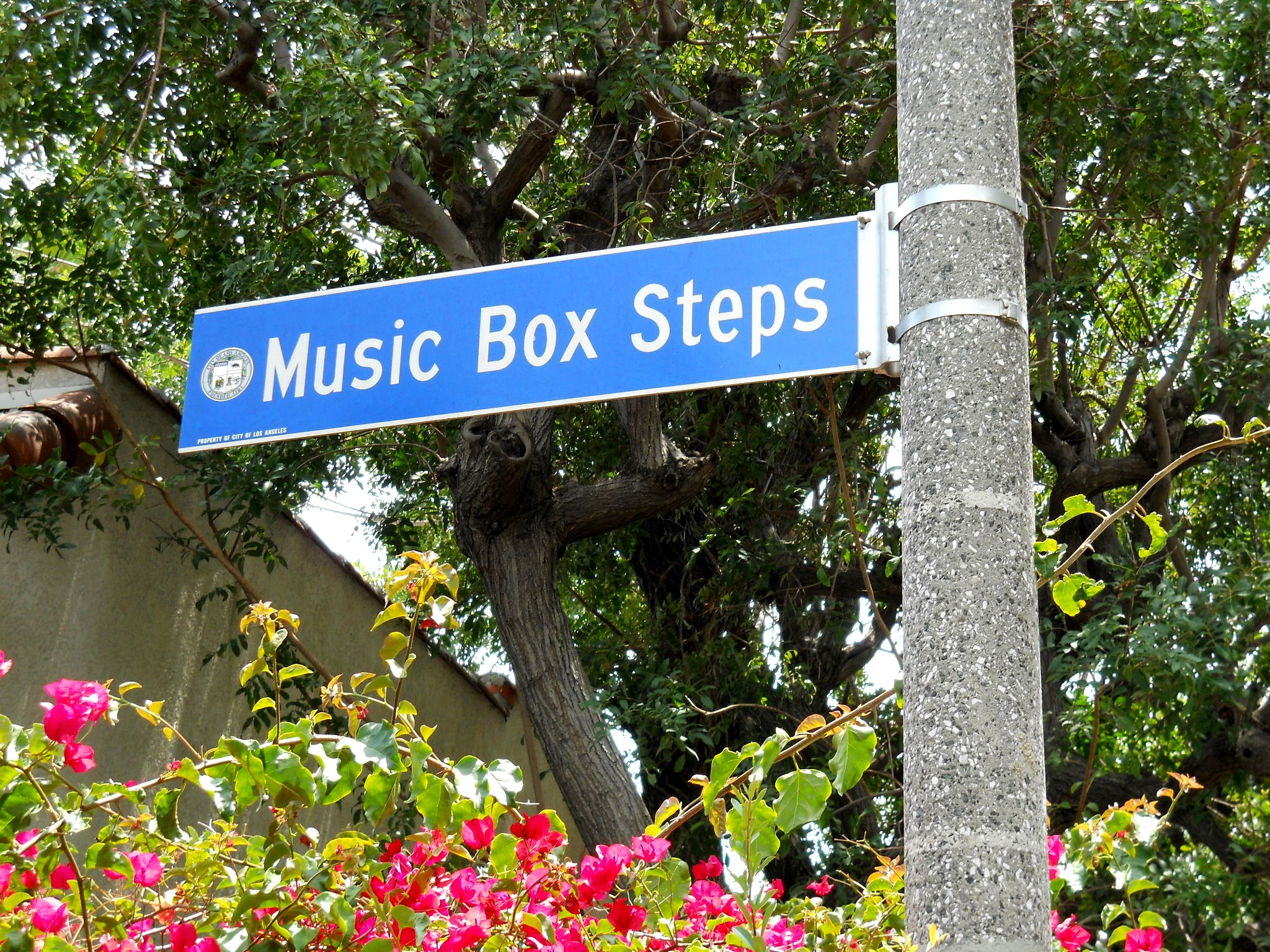
Sign at top of hill, Descanso Drive

The steps, 133 with multiple landings, which are the focal point of The Music Box, still exist in the Silver Lake district of Los Angeles, near the Laurel and Hardy Park. The steps are a public staircase that connects Vendome Street (at the base of the hill) with Descanso Drive (at the top of the hill), and are located at 923-925 North Vendome Street near the intersection of Del Monte Drive. A plaque commemorating the film was set into one of the lower steps.

The steps can also be seen in the Charley Chase silent comedy Isn't Life Terrible? (1925), during a scene in which Chase is trying to sell fountain pens to Fay Wray. The steps are also used, for a gag similar to Hats Off and The Music Box, in Ice Cold Cocos (1926), a Billy Bevan comedy short directed by Del Lord. The steps are also referenced in The Laurel and Hardy Love Affair, a short story by Ray Bradbury, as the meeting place of the couple in the story, who call each other Ollie and Stan in homage to the comedic duo.

Although similar in appearance, the staircase is not the same one used by The Three Stooges in their 1941 film An Ache in Every Stake. Those stairs (147 steps in length) are approximately two miles northeast, located at 2212 Edendale Place in the Silver Lake district of Los Angeles.

== Reception ==
The short was popular with audiences in 1932 and generally well received by critics. After previewing The Music Box in late February that year, the New York trade paper The Film Daily assured theater owners that the comedy "is up to the Laurel-Hardy standard, and should score easily." Motion Picture Herald, after previewing the film in March, described it as "great fun" and noted, "Unusually long for a comedy [short], it is well worth the extra length." The Chicago-based movie magazine Motion Picture is even more enthusiastic about the comedy in its June 1932 issue:

[Laurel and Hardy's] latest "short" lasts thirty minutes. And it is a fast and funny half-hour. Perhaps they got their idea from Charlie Chaplin, who once was screamingly funny as a piano-mover's helper—but don't hold that against them. They have improved on Chaplin, which is no easy task. Not with a pair as absurdly, ridiculously, and insanely awkward as these two. The gags are almost as side-splitting as they are.

Not all contemporary reviews, however, were positive. Variety, the entertainment industry's leading paper in 1932, did not publish its review of The Music Box until November 22, over seven months after MGM officially released the short to theaters. The reviewer, Alfred Greason, wrote:

Less than average subject for this comedy pair, who depend on house wrecking for their laughs instead of upon the laughs within the situations themselves. Any pair of clowns can make haw-haws out of roughhouse; this pair have reached distinction by reason of a comic quality within themselves. Resort to house wrecking argues lack of resources in the 'script' department.

Leslie Halliwell gave it four of four stars: "Quintessential Laurel and Hardy, involving almost all their aspects including a slight song and dance."

== Remakes ==
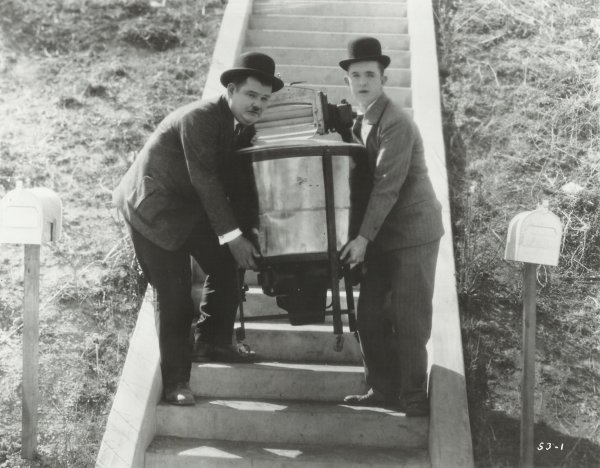
A Still from the short Hats Off!.

- The film is a partial remake of their lost silent short Hats Off! (1927), directed by Hal Yates, which utilized a washing machine instead of a piano, and was filmed at the same location and is today considered a lost film. Hats Off was itself remade by Edgar Kennedy in 1945 as It's Your Move (again directed by Yates), but utilizing a different staircase although located in the same vicinity where the "Music Box Steps" are in Silver Lake (known as the Descanso Stairs, they are situated at the intersection of Descanso and Larissa drives, specifically between the residences of 3217 Descanso Drive and 3200-3206 Larissa Drive, and one block from Sunset Boulevard, which can be seen in the background in several long shots).
- Hal Roach Studios colorized The Music Box in 1986 with a remastered stereo soundtrack featuring the Hal Roach Studios incidental stock music score conducted by Ronnie Hazelhurst. The film was later released on VHS along with a colorized version of Helpmates.
- With some aspects of the original script omitted, actor Jorge Arvizu and other actors have produced additional Spanish versions of The Music Box, as well as other remakes of Laurel and Hardy shorts and features.

== See also ==
- "Right Said Fred", a popular 1962 novelty song by Bernard Cribbins that depicts a similar scenario.
