= Isn't Life Terrible? =

1925 film

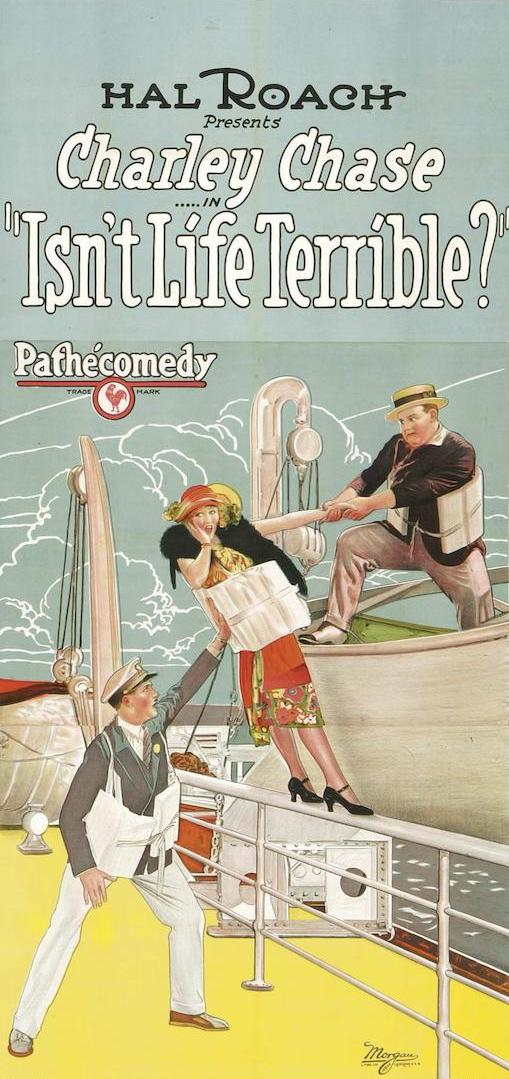
- Film poster
- Directed by: Leo McCarey
- Produced by: Hal Roach
- Starring: Charley Chase; Oliver Hardy
- Cinematography: Fred Jackman; Len Powers
- Distributed by: Pathé Exchange
- Release date: July 5, 1925
- Running time: 20 minutes
- Country: United States
- Languages: Silent film English intertitles

Isn't Life Terrible? is a 1925 American film starring Charley Chase and featuring Oliver Hardy and Fay Wray. This short is a parody on D. W. Griffith's 1924 drama Isn't Life Wonderful (1924). The staircase used in this film is the same outdoor staircase seen in Hats Off (1927) and The Music Box (1932). The staircase still exists in Silver Lake, Los Angeles.

== Plot ==
This plot summary was published in Motion Picture News for July 4, 1925:

"Isn't Life Terrible?" is a timely play about a family man who must take the wife and kiddie on a vacation. There is no money, so he enters a fountain-pen selling contest to win a free trip across the sea. He is declared one of the winners and the trip is made on an antiquated bark having brittle life boats, lifebelts which sink immediately, and which develops leaks at the slightest provocation. There is some good action concerning the child, which gets lost, and a brother-in-law who tags along. The latter is a thorough pest and the spectator can cheer with our hero when the ship's carpenter tells him that the brother-inlaw broke his leg climbing up the rigging and had to be shot.

Katherine Grant is pleasing as the wife, and Bebe Hardy and Lon Poff do good work in support. "Isn't Life Terrible?" is not a sidesplitting comedy, but it is never dull, and that, in view of the rather lean supply of good comedies on the current market, makes it good enough for the best of programs.

== Cast ==
- Charley Chase as Charley
- Katherine Grant as The Wife
- Oliver "Babe" Hardy as Remington - the Brother-in-Law
- Lon Poff as Mr. Jolly
- Dorothy Morrison as Little Black Girl (uncredited)
- Nancy McKee as The Daughter (uncredited)
- Leo Willis as The salesman (uncredited)
- Fay Wray as Potential pen buyer (uncredited)
- Charles Stevenson as Medical Officer (uncredited)
- Charlie Hall as Steward Who Drops Plates (uncredited)
- William Gillespie as Latin American Official (uncredited)
- Sammy Brooks (uncredited)

== See also ==
- List of American films of 1925
