= That's My Wife (1929 film) =

1929 short film by Lloyd French

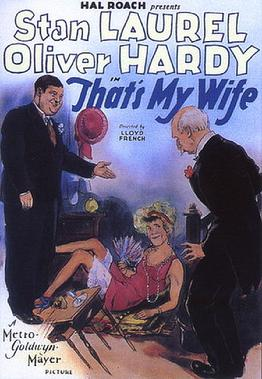
- Theatrical release poster
- Directed by: Lloyd French
- Written by: Leo McCarey (story); H. M. Walker (titles)
- Produced by: Hal Roach
- Starring: Stan Laurel; Oliver Hardy
- Cinematography: George Stevens
- Edited by: Richard C. Currier
- Distributed by: Metro-Goldwyn-Mayer
- Release date: March 23, 1929
- Running time: 20 minutes
- Country: United States
- Languages: Synchronized Sound; English (Intertitles)

That's My Wife is a 1929 synchronized sound short subject film produced by the Hal Roach Studios and starring Laurel and Hardy. While the film has no audible dialog, it was released with a synchronized orchestral musical score with sound effects. It was shot in December 1928 and released March 23, 1929, by Metro-Goldwyn-Mayer.

== Plot ==
That's My Wife (1929)

Mrs. Hardy is visibly discontented, carrying a suitcase as she confronts her husband and Stan, who sits passively on the sofa. Faced with Mrs. Hardy's ultimatum to choose between her and Stan, Ollie hesitates briefly before his wife departs in a fit of anger, disregarding his financial concerns.

The narrative continues when Stan is disguised as Ollie's wife to deceive Uncle Bernal, who arrives unexpectedly. Despite their efforts to conceal the chaos, Stan's clumsy impersonation of Ollie's wife leads to complications, particularly during a dinner outing at The Pink Pup.

At the supper club, Stan's behavior further exacerbates the situation, drawing unwanted attention from a drunken patron and a dishonest waiter who steals a diamond pendant. Subsequent misadventures on the dance floor culminate in Uncle Bernal's decision to disinherit Ollie, leaving him distraught and disillusioned.

As Ollie contemplates his misfortune outside the club, he receives a final blow when the same drunk patron from earlier spills soup on his head.

== Cast ==
Credited:
- Stan Laurel as Stan
- Oliver Hardy as Ollie

Uncredited:

- Vivien Oakland as Mrs. Hardy
- William Courtright as Uncle Bernal
- Jimmy Aubrey as Drunk
- Harry Bernard as Waiter
- Charlie Hall as Waiter
- Sam Lufkin as Waiter
- Dorothy Christy as Undetermined Role

== Production and exhibition ==
December 1928 was a frenetic month for the Laurel and Hardy unit at Roach: they had a commitment for several films, and the studio was slated to close at the end of the month for the installation of the new sound equipment. The filming of the "minor masterpiece" Wrong Again had just wrapped on the first, and the unit would go on to wrap its landmark Big Business just after Christmas.

Leo McCarey got the "Story by" credit, although L&H Encyclopedia author Glenn Mitchell also traces some lineage back to the 1926 Roach short Along Came Auntie, with Glenn Tryon and Oliver Hardy and a writing co-credit for Stan Laurel. L&H scholar Randy Skretvedt has run down many of the "action scripts" for L&H two reelers, and the one for That's My Wife reveals a few differences between original concept and finished film. One is a sub-plot that finds the actual Magnolia Hardy at a nearby table at the Pink Pup, and she becomes the target of flirtations from Uncle Bernal. There was also an unfilmed (or unused) gag where a helium balloon tangles in Stan's wig and keeps threatening to lift it off his head.

Most significant, though, is the script-to-screen evolution of the ending. On paper, Stan was to have been searched — bodily — by a female officer in the hunt for the purloined pendant; he was to refuse the manhandling, though, and leave the club after revealing the masquerade to Uncle Bernal. Ollie was then to have informed Uncle that his real wife was the woman whom Bernal had been flirting with, and, embarrassed, Uncle would promise to pony up the inheritance — which in turn would power newfound interest by Magnolia toward her rotund hubby. "The problem with this ending," writes Skretvedt, "is that it's just too happy. Ollie still has his fortune and his wife, but he's lost Stan's friendship. In the film, he loses everything but Stan's friendship — which is more like it."

== Critical reception ==
Among the run of late silent shorts which constitute some of the duo's best work, That's My Wife is an unheralded entry. Pioneer Laurel & Hardy film analyst William K. Everson wrote in 1967 "Comparatively little known, this is perhaps the funniest and best of the many films in which Laurel masquerades as a woman. The single theme is handled with infinite variety throughout...." Everson's judgment, though, might be clouded by the fact that he was writing from memory in the pre-home video days; he does, after all, write that "Laurel... makes a most fetching dame...." Film critic Leslie Halliwell calls the short a "lesser-known star comedy which well sustains its basic joke and includes some splendidly timed farce in a restaurant." Glenn Mitchell added "The intricacies of balancing on high heels are matched by the task of maintaining an ersatz bosom (supplied by small barbells), but Stan convinces in the role."
