= Roaring Ranch =

1930 film

- Directed by: B. Reeves Eason
- Screenplay by: B. Reeves Eason
- Story by: B. Reeves Eason
- Produced by: Hoot Gibson
- Starring: Hoot Gibson
- Cinematography: Harry Neumann
- Edited by: Gilmore Walker
- Music by: David Broekman
- Production company: Universal Pictures
- Distributed by: Universal Pictures
- Release date: April 27, 1930
- Running time: 68 minutes
- Country: United States
- Language: English

Roaring Ranch is a 1930 American pre-Code Western film written and directed by B. Reeves Eason. The film stars Hoot Gibson. Tt was released on April 27, 1930, by Universal Pictures.

== Cast ==
- Hoot Gibson as Jim Dailey
- Frank Clark as Tom Marlin
- Sally Eilers as June Marlin
- Wheeler Oakman as Ramsey Kane
- Agnes Steele as Mrs. Morgan
- Bobby Nelson as Bobby Morgan
- Marlyn Walker as Marlyn
- Leo White as Count Reginald Sobieski
