= Walt Coburn =

American novelist (1889–1971)

- Born: Walter John Coburn; October 23, 1889; White Sulphur Springs, Montana Territory
- Died: May 1971 (aged 81); Prescott, Arizona, US
- Occupation: Author
- Relatives: Dorothy Coburn (niece)
- Military career
- Allegiance: United States
- Branch: Army aviation corps
- Service years: World War I

Walter John Coburn (October 23, 1889 – May 1971) was an American writer of Westerns. Coburn was born in White Sulphur Springs, Montana Territory, the son of Robert Coburn Senior, the founder of the noted Circle C Ranch located south of Malta. The actress Dorothy Coburn is his niece.

Coburn served in the Army aviation corps during the World War I era. He later spent time as a cowboy and a surveyor, before becoming a full-time writer in the 1920s.

== Western author ==
Coburn began his career with Western stories in general fiction pulp magazines such as Adventure and Argosy. Later Coburn moved on to pulps specializing in Westerns, including Western Story Magazine, Lariat Story Magazine, Ace-High Western and Frontier Stories. He often wrote for the Fiction House pulp magazines, which promoted Coburn as "the Cowboy Author".

Coburn was enormously prolific; Flanagan states Coburn wrote almost two million words of fiction over a thirty year period. Coburn at his most prolific, averaged over 600,000 published words per year. He was so popular that eventually, two pulp magazines - Walt Coburn’s Western Magazine and Walt Coburn’s Action Novels were issued, consisting mainly of reprints of Coburn's work.

After the pulps ended in the 1950s, Coburn switched his focus to writing paperback originals.

Coburn was a devout Christian. Coburn claimed, in his posthumously published autobiography Western Word Wrangler (1973) that God had chosen him to spread the Christian message through his fiction.

Coburn committed suicide at age 82 in Prescott, Arizona.

== Bibliography ==
=== Stories ===
- Paid Off (1925)
- The Ringtailed Rannyhans (1927)
- The man who hated himself (1928)
- A notched gun (1928)
- Mavericks (1929)
- Barb Wire (1931)
- Walt Coburn's action novels; four western novels (1931)
- The Passing of Poker Joe (Dime Western Magazine 1933-02)
- Son of a Gun Man (Dime Western Magazine 1933-03)
- Guns beyond the Border (Dime Western Magazine 1933-10)
- Brand of the Badlands (Dime Western Magazine 1933-12)
- Outlawed! (Dime Western Magazine 1934-01)
- The Hoot-Owl Pool (Dime Western Magazine 1934-02)
- The Hell Creek Maverick (Dime Western Magazine 1934-03)
- Cowman's Law (Dime Western Magazine 1934-04)
- Outlawed Orphan (Dime Western Magazine 1934-05)
- Maverick Men (Dime Western Magazine 1934-06)
- The Death Maverick (Dime Western Magazine 1934-07)
- Men of the Dark Trails (Dime Western Magazine 1934-08)
- Rim-Rock Renegades (Dime Western Magazine 1934-09-01)
- Black Outlaw (Dime Western Magazine 1934-10-01)
- Renegade Law (Dime Western Magazine 1934-10-15)
- Brand Blotters' Blood Tally (Dime Western Magazine 1934-11-01)
- The Rio Renegade (Dime Western Magazine 1934-12-15)
- Creed of the Lawless (Dime Western Magazine 1935-01-01)
- Satan's Saddle Mates (Dime Western Magazine 1935-02-15)
- Ghost Guns of Black Coulee (Dime Western Magazine 1935-03-01)
- The Rolling-R Rides to Glory (Dime Western Magazine 1935-04-01)
- Badlands Orphan (Dime Western Magazine 1935-04-15)
- Six Gringos Ride to Hell (Dime Western Magazine 1935-05-01)
- Branded Men (Dime Western Magazine 1935-05-15)
- Hate for a Lawman (Dime Western Magazine 1935-06-01)
- Feud Guns of Brady's Basin (Dime Western Magazine 1935-06-15)
- The Partner of Buckshot Blue (Dime Western Magazine 1935-07-01)
- Wanted Man's Gamble (Dime Western Magazine 1935-07-15)
- Badlands Lawman (Dime Western Magazine 1935-08-01)
- Son of the Owlhoot (Dime Western Magazine 1935-08-15)
- The Law Rides to Wolf Hole (Dime Western Magazine 1935-09-01)
- Tom Ball--Gun-Doctor (Dime Western Magazine 1935-10-01)
- Gunsmoke Born (Dime Western Magazine 1935-10-15)
- Wild-Bunch Lawman (Dime Western Magazine 1935-11-01)
- Gun Ghosts of Skull Creek (Dime Western Magazine 1935-12-01)
- Vigilante Vengeance (Dime Western Magazine 1936-02)
- Wild Men in Buckskin (Dime Western Magazine 1936-03)
- Missouri River Renegade (Dime Western Magazine 1936-04)
- Six-Gun Quarantine (Dime Western Magazine 1936-05)
- The Dead-Game Tinhorn (Dime Western Magazine 1936-06)
- The Badlands Vigilante (Dime Western Magazine 1936-07)
- The Button rides to War (Dime Western Magazine 1936-08)
- Trail Herd to Perdition (Dime Western Magazine 1936-09)
- The Wagon Train Feud (Dime Western Magazine 1936-10)
- A New Marshall for Pinto (Dime Western Magazine 1936-11)
- Gun Cub of the Black Wolf (Dime Western Magazine 1937-01)
- Blind Man's Gun Bluff (Dime Western Magazine 1937-02)
- Straw Boss for the Damned (Dime Western Magazine 1937-03)
- A Renegade rules the S-C Ranch (Dime Western Magazine 1937-04)
- Death rides with the Black Fergusons (Dime Western Magazine 1937-05)
- The Gringo who wouldn't die (Dime Western Magazine 1937-06)
- Last Stand of the Gila Pool Cowmen (Dime Western Magazine 1937-07)
- Lone Wolf of the Feud Pack (Dime Western Magazine 1937-09)
- The Raw Red Trail to Dodge! (Dime Western Magazine 1937-10)
- Trail Herd's Gunsmoke Market (Dime Western Magazine 1937-11)
- Sun Prairie's Powdersmoke Revival (Dime Western Magazine 1937-12)
- Guns break trail for a Texan's Herd (Dime Western Magazine 1938-01)
- Death waits West of Dodge (Dime Western Magazine 1938-02)
- Rawhide, Gunsmoke--and Texas Cattle! (Dime Western Magazine 1938-03)
- Stepson of the Wild Bunch (Dime Western Magazine 1938-04)
- His Partner, the Gun Ghost (Dime Western Magazine 1938-05)
- The Badlands send[s] a Fighting Man (Dime Western Magazine 1938-06)
- Signed on to die! (Dime Western Magazine 1938-07)
- Fear God and shoot straight! (Dime Western Magazine 1938-08)
- The Owlhoot makes a Cowman (Dime Western Magazine 1938-09)
- Doc Masters' last gun deal (Dime Western Magazine 1938-10)
- The Gunsmoke Cub finds a Brand (Dime Western Magazine 1938-11)
- Recruit for the Hang-Noose Syndicate (Dime Western Magazine 1938-12)
- The Trail Drive God forgot (Dime Western Magazine 1939-01)
- Breaking of the Horse-Thief Pool (Dime Western Magazine 1939-02)
- Gun Call for Wind River Riders (Dime Western Magazine 1939-03)
- The Square Dealer of Last Chance (Dime Western Magazine 1939-04)
- Gunsmoke Bonus for Stolen Beef (Dime Western Magazine 1939-05)
- Button Brewster rides to war (Dime Western Magazine 1939-06)
- Lon Pike's last Gunsmoke Sermon (Dime Western Magazine 1939-07)
- Marked with Satan's Road-Brand (Dime Western Magazine 1939-08)
- The Summer of the Black Snow (Dime Western Magazine 1939-09)
- Free Bullets for the Quick-Grave Legion (Dime Western Magazine 1939-10)
- Gun Guide for Satan's Border-Jumpers (Dime Western Magazine 1939-11)
- Gray Wool brings Gunsmoke (Dime Western Magazine 1939-12)
- War Smoke guides the Western Mails (Dime Western Magazine 1940-01)
- New Graves at Hide-Out Ranch (Dime Western Magazine 1940-02)
- Gunsmoke Key to the Padlocked Deadline (Dime Western Magazine 1940-03)
- Too Soft for the Owlhoot (Dime Western Magazine 1940-04)
- Gun Partners of the Overland Mail (Dime Western Magazine 1940-05)
- Smoke McGonigal's last Gun-Chore (Dime Western Magazine 1940-06)
- Gun-Call for Buckskin Warriors (Dime Western Magazine 1940-07)
- A Greenhorn rides the Death Watch (Dime Western Magazine 1940-09)
- The Bear-Paw Man-Breaker (Dime Western Magazine 1940-10)
- The Fighting Flaggs ride at Midnight! (Dime Western Magazine 1940-11)
- The Mad Gunman of Wolf Tooth Point (Dime Western Magazine 1940-12)
- Law Rides the Range (1935)
- Sky-Pilot Cowboy (1937)
- Hired to Kill (Dime Western Magazine 1945-12)
- Pardners of the Dim Trails (1951) (vt: Tough Texan)
- The Way of a Texan (1953)
- Drift Fence (1953)
- The Burnt Ranch (1954)
- Gun Grudge (1955)
- Wet Cattle (1955) (vt: Violent Maverick)
- The Square Shooter (1956)
- Border Jumper (1956)
- The Night Branders (1956)
- One Step Ahead of the Posse (1956)
- Cayuse (1956)
- Stirrup High (1957)
- Fear Branded (1957)
- Horse Thief Trail (1957)
- Spider-Web Ridge (1958)
- Beyond the Wild Missouri (1958)
- Buffalo Run (1958) (vt: Fast Gun)
- Free Rangers (1959)
- Dark and Bloody Ground (1960)
- Guns Blaze on Spiderweb Range (1961)
- Invitation to a Hanging (1963)
- Ramrod (1963)
- Branded (1963)
- Sons of Gunfighters (1963)
- The Kansas Killers (1966)
- Feud Valley (1969)
- The Renegade (1969)
- La Jornada (1971)
- Sleeper's Mark (1990)
- Showdown Mesa (1992)
- Coffin Ranch : a western trio (1998; edited by Jon Tuska).

=== Non-fiction ===
- Pioneer Cattleman in Montana: Story of the Circle C Ranch (1968)
- Western Word Wrangler (1973)
