= Ellinor Vanderveer =

American actress (1886–1976)

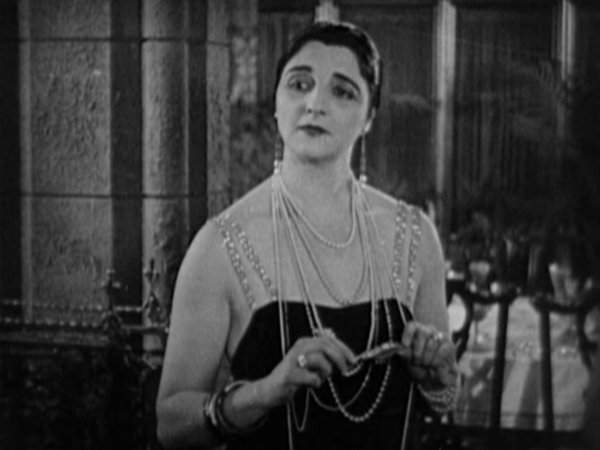
- From The Second Hundred Years (1927)
- Born: August 5, 1886; New York City, New York, U.S.
- Died: May 27, 1976 (aged 89); Loma Linda, California, U.S.
- Occupation: Actress

Ellinor Vanderveer (August 5, 1886 – May 27, 1976) was an American actress.

== Biography ==
Born in New York City in 1886, in films Vanderveer usually played dowagers, high class society matrons or party guests. She appeared in 111 films from 1924 to 1953, including several Laurel and Hardy comedies and two films from early in the American career of British-born James Whale.

== Personal life ==
She died in Loma Linda, California, in 1976.

== Selected filmography ==
- Married Flirts (1924) - Elinor Vanderveer (uncredited)
- Lady of the Night (1925) - Dancing Patron at Nightclub (uncredited)
- The Phantom of the Opera (1925) - Operagoer (uncredited)
- Paths to Paradise (1925) - Party Guest (uncredited)
- The Other Woman's Story (1925) - Party Guest
- Her Sister from Paris (1925) - Theatre Patron (uncredited)
- The Merry Widow (1925) - Ballroom Dancer (uncredited)
- The Red Kimona (1925) - Woman With Defense Attorney's Wife (uncredited)
- Stella Dallas (1925) - Society Matron (uncredited)
- Lady Windermere's Fan (1925) - Party Guest (uncredited)
- Kiki (1926) - Restaurant Patron (uncredited)
- Skinner's Dress Suit (1926) - Party Guest (uncredited)
- You Never Know Women (1926) - Theatre Audience Spectator (uncredited)
- Into Her Kingdom (1926) - Czarina
- The Duchess of Buffalo (1926) - Lady in Waiting (uncredited)
- Diplomacy (1926) - Dinner Guest (uncredited)
- Bardelys the Magnificent (1926) - Court Gossip (uncredited)
- Flesh and the Devil (1926) - Ball Guest (uncredited)
- The Second Hundred Years (1927, Short) - Countess de Cognac (uncredited)
- Sally in Our Alley (1927) - Society Matron (uncredited)
- The Girl in the Pullman (1927) - A Guest (uncredited)
- The Battle of the Century (1927, Short) - Lady in car (uncredited)
- Bare Knees (1928) - Society Woman (uncredited)
- The Smart Set (1928) - Party Guest (uncredited)
- From Soup to Nuts (1928, Short) - Dinner Guest (uncredited)
- Synthetic Sin (1929) - Woman in Theatre Audience (uncredited)
- The Iron Mask (1929) - Lady of the Court (uncredited)
- Street Girl (1929) - Dowager at Little Aregon (uncredited)
- The Unholy Night (1929) - Guest at First Seance (uncredited)
- Jazz Heaven (1929) - Floor Show Spectator (uncredited)
- The Hoose-Gow (1929, Short) - Party guest (uncredited)
- The Sky Hawk (1929) - Auto Passenger (uncredited)
- Party Girl (1930) - Leeda's 'Mother' (uncredited)
- Love Comes Along (1930) - Fiesta Participant (uncredited)
- The Girl Said No (1930) - Wedding Guest (uncredited)
- A Notorious Affair (1930) - Duchess of Brougham (uncredited)
- Way Out West (1930) - Party Guest (uncredited)
- Extravagance (1930) - Wedding Guest (uncredited)
- Sunny (1930) - Party Guest (uncredited)
- Remote Control (1930) - Girl Musician (uncredited)
- Passion Flower (1930) - Party Guest (uncredited)
- Going Wild (1930) - Banquet Guest (uncredited)
- Kiss Me Again (1931) - Reception Guest (uncredited)
- Aloha (1931) - Socialite (uncredited)
- Politiquerías (1931) - Party Guest (uncredited)
- Never the Twain Shall Meet (1931) - Dressmaker (uncredited)
- Svengali (1931) - Concertgoer (uncredited)
- The Common Law (1931) - Party Guest (uncredited)
- Son of India (1931) - Polo Club Guest (uncredited)
- The Mystery Train (1931) - Couturiere (uncredited)
- Broadminded (1931) - Restaurant Diner (uncredited)
- The Woman Between (1931) - Party Guest (uncredited)
- Pleasure (1931) - Society Matron (uncredited)
- The Phantom of Paris (1931) - Party Guest (uncredited)
- Platinum Blonde (1931) - Party Guest (uncredited)
- Frankenstein (1931) - Medical Student (uncredited)
- Men of Chance (1931) - Racetrack Spectator (uncredited)
- Stepping Sisters (1932) - French National Debt (uncredited)
- Sally of the Subway (1932) - Mrs. Stubbs (uncredited)
- High Pressure (1932) - Woman on Dock (uncredited)
- The Greeks Had a Word for Them (1932) - Wedding Guest (uncredited)
- Hotel Continental (1932) - Hotel Guest (uncredited)
- The Impatient Maiden (1932) - Visitor (uncredited)
- Arsène Lupin (1932) - Party Guest (uncredited)
- Devil's Lottery (1932) - Inquest Onlooker (uncredited)
- Scarface (1932) - Theatregoer (uncredited)
- Sinners in the Sun (1932) - Party Guest (uncredited)
- The Rich Are Always with Us (1932) - Night Club Patron (uncredited)
- Street of Women (1932) - Well-Wisher (uncredited)
- Downstairs (1932) - Party Guest (uncredited)
- Movie Crazy (1932) - Mrs. Crumplin (uncredited)
- Two Against the World (1932) - Party Guest (uncredited)
- Pack Up Your Troubles (1932) - Wedding Guest (uncredited)
- A Successful Calamity (1932) - Musicale Guest (uncredited)
- Scarlet Dawn (1932) - Kalin's Dinner Guest (uncredited)
- Now We'll Tell One (1932, Short) - Party Guest with Butterfly (uncredited)
- Call Her Savage (1932) - Party Guest (uncredited)
- Secrets of the French Police (1932) - 1st Cohort of Moloff (uncredited)
- Fast Life (1932) - Guest (uncredited)
- Rasputin and the Empress (1932) - Court Dignitary Watching Celebration Mass (uncredited)
- The King's Vacation (1933) - Autograph Seeker at Casino (uncredited)
- Employees' Entrance (1933) - Attendee at Meeting of Department Heads (uncredited)
- She Done Him Wrong (1933) - Well-Wisher in Audience (uncredited)
- A Bedtime Story (1933) - Party Guest (uncredited)
- Reunion in Vienna (1933) - Noblewoman (uncredited)
- The Eagle and the Hawk (1933) - Party Guest (uncredited)
- Private Detective 62 (1933) - Woman in Speakeasy (uncredited)
- Golden Harvest (1933) - Reception Guest (uncredited)
- Gigolettes of Paris (1933) - Diane's Friend (uncredited)
- Search for Beauty (1934) - Beauty Shop Manager (uncredited)
- Caravan (1934) - Wedding Guest (uncredited)
- Bolero (1934) - Chez Raoul Patron (uncredited)
- Journal of a Crime (1934) - Ambassador's Wife (uncredited)
- Finishing School (1934) - Reception Guest (uncredited)
- Going Bye-Bye! (1934, Short) - Jury Member (uncredited)
- Shoot the Works (1934) - Night Club Patron (uncredited)
- Whom the Gods Destroy (1934) - Ship Passenger (uncredited)
- Belle of the Nineties (1934) - New Orleans Dowager (uncredited)
- Washee Ironee (1934, Short) - Waldo's mother
- Rumba (1935) - Member of Audience (uncredited)
- Times Square Lady (1935) - Casa Nova Patron (uncredited)
- Vagabond Lady (1935) - Spear Department Head (uncredited)
- Let 'Em Have It (1935) - Dowager (uncredited)
- The Irish in Us (1935) - Fight Spectator (uncredited)
- A Night at the Opera (1935) - Shipboard Dinner Party Guest / Opera Spectator (uncredited)
- Man of Iron (1935) - Party Guest (uncredited)
- The Great Ziegfeld (1936) - Audience Member (uncredited)
- Moonlight Murder (1936) - Attendee at Hollywood Bowl (uncredited)
- Mr. Deeds Goes to Town (1936) - Party Guest (uncredited)
- The Princess Comes Across (1936) - Ship's Passenger at Concert (uncredited)
- Girls' Dormitory (1936) - Graduation Attendee / Cafe Patron (uncredited)
- Mr. Cinderella (1936) - Splashed Woman at Party (uncredited)
- Slippery Silks (1936, Short) - Lady Wanting Dress Adjustment (uncredited)
- Confession (1937) - Courtroom Spectator (uncredited)
- The Last of Mrs. Cheyney (1937) - Member of the Comedie Française (uncredited)
- A Damsel in Distress (1937) - Minor Role (uncredited)
- When G-Men Step In (1938) - Society Woman (uncredited)
- The Rage of Paris (1938) - Opera Spectator (uncredited)
- The Great Waltz (1938) - Party Guest (uncredited)
- The Girl Downstairs (1938) - Party Guest (uncredited)
- The Story of Vernon and Irene Castle (1939) - Guest with the Grand Duke (uncredited)
- The Cowboy Quarterback (1939) - Casino Extra (uncredited)
- The Old Maid (1939) - Wedding Attendant (uncredited)
- First Love (1939) - Ball Guest (uncredited)
- Ninotchka (1939) - Gossip (uncredited)
- Raffles (1939) - Passerby Extra (uncredited)
- Balalaika (1939) - (uncredited)
- I Was an Adventuress (1940) - Englishwoman at Exhibit (uncredited)
- All This, and Heaven Too (1940) - Opera Spectator in King's Group (uncredited)
- My Love Came Back (1940) - Party Guest (uncredited)
- Seven Sinners (1940) - Party Guest (uncredited)
- Skylark (1941) - Member of Theatre Audience (uncredited)
- Hellzapoppin' (1941) - Audience Extra (uncredited)
- Larceny, Inc. (1942) - Passerby (uncredited)
- Flying with Music (1942) - Patron (uncredited)
- Maisie Gets Her Man (1942) - Dowager (uncredited)
- Crossroads (1942) - Cafe Patron (uncredited)
- Tales of Manhattan (1942) - Party Guest (Fields sequence) (uncredited)
- You Were Never Lovelier (1942) - Horse Race Spectator (uncredited)
- Casablanca (1942) - Woman Gambler at Rick's Next to Croupier (uncredited)
- Mr. Lucky (1943) - Gambler (uncredited)
- Christmas Holiday (1944) - Courtroom Spectator (uncredited)
- Lost in a Harem (1944) - Slave Girl (uncredited)
- A Song for Miss Julie (1945) - Guest (uncredited)
- Yolanda and the Thief (1945) - Hotel Guest with Fan (uncredited)
- Gallant Journey (1946) - Dance Floor Extra (uncredited)
- Gentleman Joe Palooka (1946) - Party Guest (uncredited)
- The Jolson Story (1946) - Maid (uncredited)
- Deception (1946) - Restaurant Diner (uncredited)
- The Beast with Five Fingers (1946) - Mourner (uncredited)
- The Exile (1947) - Woman (uncredited)
- B.F.'s Daughter (1948) - Woman at Hamlet Play (uncredited)
- An Innocent Affair (1948) - Venetian Room Patron (uncredited)
- South Sea Sinner (1950) - Minor Role (uncredited)
- Annie Get Your Gun (1950) - Sour-Faced Party Guest (uncredited)
- Belle Le Grand (1951) - Woman at Stock Exchange (uncredited)
- The Strange Door (1951) - Wedding Guest (uncredited)
- Lili (1953) - Woman in Brown Whom Lili Waits on in Cabaret (uncredited)
- The Eddie Cantor Story (1953) - Committee Woman (uncredited)
