= Whispering Whoopee =

1930 film

- Directed by: James W. Horne
- Written by: H.M. Walker (dialogue)
- Produced by: Hal Roach
- Cinematography: Len Powers
- Edited by: Richard C. Currier
- Music by: Leroy Shield (uncredited)
- Production company: Hal Roach Studios
- Distributed by: Metro-Goldwyn-Mayer
- Release date: March 8, 1930 (US)
- Running time: 20 minutes
- Country: United States
- Language: English

Whispering Whoopee is a 1930 American Pre-Code short film directed by James W. Horne. It is in the public domain.

== Cast ==
- Charley Chase as Charley
- Thelma Todd as Miss Todd
- Anita Garvin as Miss Garvin
- Dolores Brinkman as Miss Brinkman
- Kay Deslys as Miss Deslys
- Eddie Dunn as Ricketts, the Butler
- Dell Henderson as Mr. Henderson
- Carl Stockdale as Mr. Stockdale
- Tenen Holtz as Mr. Holtz
