= Agnes Steele =

American actress

Agnes Steele (August 22, 1881 – March 3, 1949) was an American actress. She appeared in 13 films between 1926 and 1949.

She died at her home and was buried in Calvary Cemetery's mausoleum in Los Angeles on March 8, 1949.

== Selected filmography ==
- My Old Dutch (1926)
- You're Darn Tootin' (1928)
- Roaring Ranch (1930)
