= The Battle of the Century =

1927 silent film by Clyde Bruckman

Battle of the Century
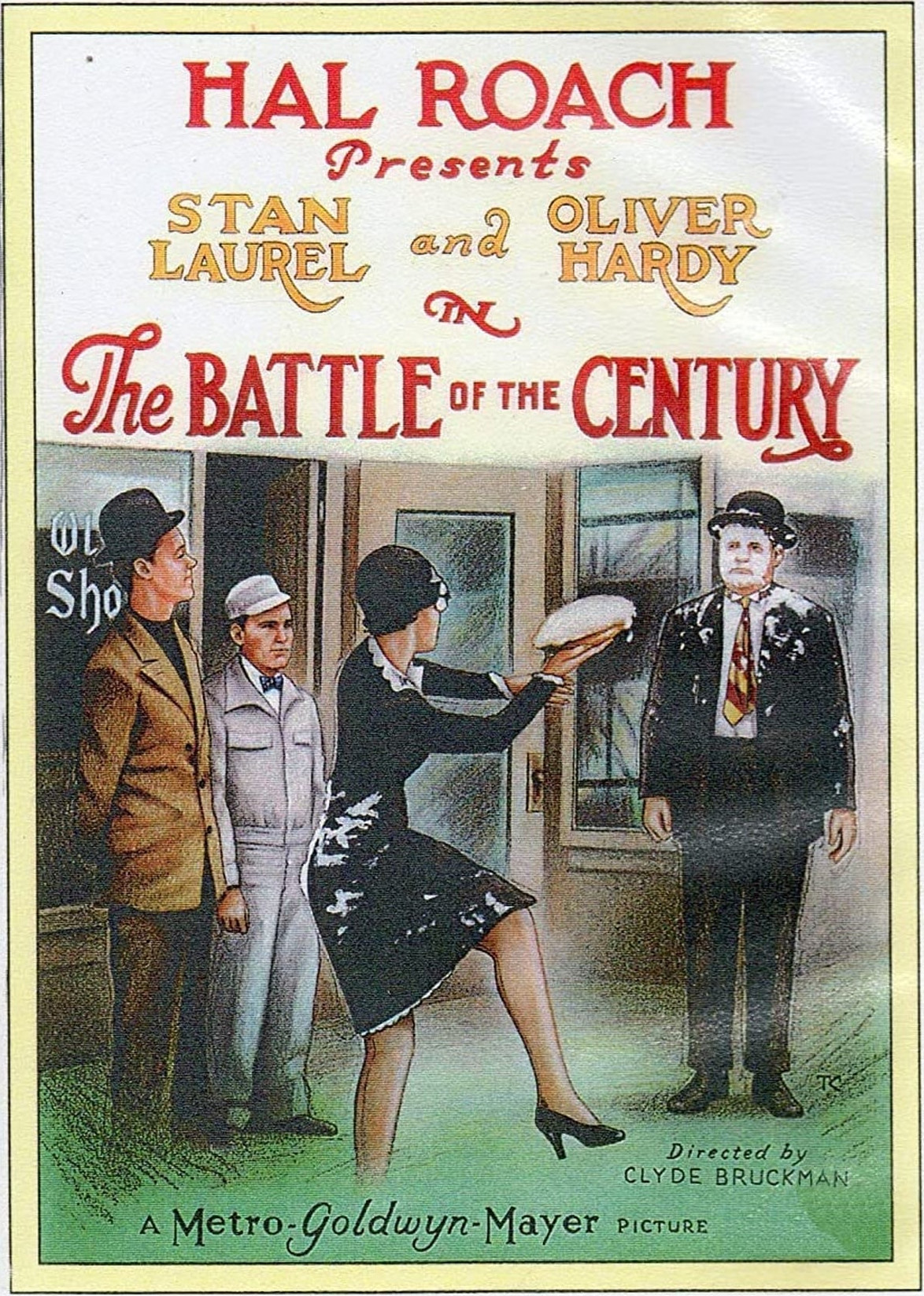
- Theatrical release poster
- Directed by: Clyde Bruckman
- Written by: Hal Roach; H.M. Walker
- Produced by: Hal Roach
- Starring: Stan Laurel; Oliver Hardy; Noah Young; Eugene Pallette; Charlie Hall; Sam Lufkin; Gene Morgan; Steve Murphy; George B. French; Dick Sutherland; Anita Garvin; Dick Gilbert; Wilson Benge
- Cinematography: George Stevens
- Edited by: Richard C. Currier
- Music by: Leroy Shield
- Production company: Hal Roach Studios
- Distributed by: Metro-Goldwyn-Mayer
- Release date: December 31, 1927
- Running time: 26:08 (2020 digital remaster)
- Country: United States
- Languages: Silent film English intertitles

The Battle of the Century (missing only the lost insurance salesman scene)

The Battle of the Century is a 1927 American silent short film starring comedy double act Laurel and Hardy, who appeared in 107 films between 1921 and 1951. The film entered the public domain in the United States in 2023.

== Plot ==
Facing financial hardship, Ollie orchestrates a boxing match between Stan and Thunderclap Callahan, offering a cash prize of $500 (Note: Equivalent to $9,310 in 2025) to the victor. Stan, fighting under the alias "Canvasback Clump," inadvertently knocks out Callahan in the initial round. However, Stan's refusal to return to his corner prevents the referee from completing the ten-count, allowing Callahan to recover and retaliate, ultimately overpowering Stan.

Following the match's chaotic conclusion, a disillusioned Ollie encounters an insurance salesman who convinces him to invest the meager winnings in an insurance policy on Stan, with the stipulation that Stan must sustain an injury for Ollie to profit. In a misguided attempt to fulfill this requirement, Ollie orchestrates a scenario involving a banana peel on a sidewalk. However, the plan backfires when a pastry chef becomes the unintended victim of the slippery hazard, leading to a comical altercation involving pies that quickly escalates into a neighborhood-wide skirmish.

== Cast ==
- Stan Laurel as Canvasback Clump
- Oliver Hardy as Manager
- Noah Young as Thunderclap Callahan
- Eugene Pallette as Insurance agent
- Charlie Hall as Pie delivery man
- Sam Lufkin as Boxing referee
- Gene Morgan as Ring announcer
- Steve Murphy as Callahan's second
- George B. French as Dentist
- Dick Sutherland as Dental patient
- Anita Garvin as Woman who slips on pie
- Dick Gilbert as Sewer worker
- Wilson Benge as Pie victim with top hat
- Jack O'Brien as Shoeshine patron
- Ellinor Vanderveer as Lady in car
- Lyle Tayo as Woman at window
- Dorothy Coburn as Pie victim
- Al Hallett as Pie victim
- Lou Costello as Ringside spectator
- Jack Hill as Ringside spectator
- Ham Kinsey as Ringside spectator
- Ed Brandenburg as Warring pedestrian
- Bob O'Connor as Warring pedestrian
- Bert Roach
- Dorothea Wolbert
- Charley Young

== Production notes ==
The Battle of the Century is renowned for its extensive use of cream pies, with estimates ranging from over 3,000 to potentially 10,000 pies utilized in the climactic pie fight. Initially, only a three-minute segment containing the pie fight was believed to have survived, as it had been incorporated into Robert Youngson's 1950s film documentaries. However, the complete second reel, including the pie fight scene, was rediscovered in 2015 and subsequently released to the public on DVD and Blu-ray disc as part of the Laurel & Hardy: The Definitive Restorations compilation in 2020.

In recognition of its cultural significance, The Battle of the Century was selected for preservation in the United States National Film Registry by the Library of Congress in 2020 as being "culturally, historically, or aesthetically significant."

Although officially billed as a Laurel and Hardy film, the characters had yet to fully embody their iconic personas; they are not referred to as Stan and Ollie, with Laurel portraying Canvasback Clump and Hardy's manager character remaining unnamed.

Stan Laurel expressed his intention to inundate the film with so many pies that it would surpass any future pie-related cinema endeavors, saying "Let’s give them so many pies that there never will be room for any more pie pictures in the whole history of the movies."

A young Lou Costello can be spotted among the prizefight crowd early in the film, adding to its historical significance.

On September 22, 1927, Jack Dempsey had attempted to regain his heavyweight title from Gene Tunney, and due to a confusion over the recently changed rules relating to a fighter going to a neutral corner after knocking down an opponent, the referee delayed his count by five seconds, giving Tunney more time to recover, leading to his winning a controversial points victory (though he insisted he was ready to get up and resume fighting by the time the ref got to two). The Long Count Fight would have been a major point of contention at the time the film was made, with many saying Dempsey had stupidly thrown away a win, and the comically long count in the film intentionally exaggerates what really happened. Dempsey hit Tunney with a big left hand while scoring the knockdown, and it's Stan's lackadaisical left that accidentally floors his opponent.

== Lost film status ==
For an extended period, only the climactic pie fight from The Battle of the Century was known to have survived. This changed in 1979 when Richard Feiner discovered the opening reel featuring the boxing match scene. However, certain segments, including Eugene Pallette's role as the insurance salesman in the park and the final gag involving a policeman receiving a pie in the face, remained missing.

During the 1970s, Spanish television (station TVE1) aired what was believed to be the entire film, which included additional scenes such as a customer in a barber's chair receiving a pie in the face and a man purchasing two pies to join the pie fight.

In June 2015, at the Mostly Lost film workshop in Culpeper, Virginia, film collector Jon Mirsalis announced the rediscovery of the second reel of The Battle of the Century. This 16mm print, sourced from the original 35mm negative, was found in the film collection of Gordon Berkow, who had acquired it from Robert Youngson, a Laurel and Hardy film compilations writer and director. Youngson had received the reel as a preview print while working on his 1957 compilation The Golden Age of Comedy.

The restoration process was initiated by Lobster Films, with subsequent restoration efforts led by Jeff Joseph in collaboration with the UCLA Film and Television Archive. The film premiered officially at the Telluride Film Festival in September 2015, followed by a screening at the BFI London Film Festival in October 2015.

On April 8, 2017, the film was showcased at the Toronto Silent Film Festival with live accompaniment by Ben Model. Similarly, on May 29, 2017, it was presented at the Southend Film Festival accompanied by Adam Ramet. Additionally, it was screened at the Mostly Lost film workshop in June 2016, coinciding with the one-year anniversary of its rediscovery, with Mirsalis providing piano accompaniment.

== See also ==
- List of incomplete or partially lost films
- List of rediscovered films
- Laurel and Hardy filmography
