= Anita Garvin =

American actress (1906–1994)

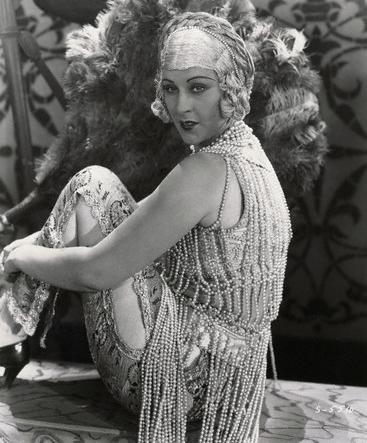
- Studio publicity photo of Anita Garvin
- Born: Anna Frances Garvin; February 11, 1906; New York City, U.S.
- Died: July 7, 1994 (aged 88); Woodland Hills, California, U.S.
- Resting place: San Fernando Mission Cemetery, Mission Hills, Los Angeles County, California
- Occupations: Film actress, stage performer
- Years active: 1918–1942
- Spouses: Clement H. Beauchamp (m. 1926; div. 1930) Clifford R. Stanley (m. 1930; his death, 1980)
- Children: 2

Anita Garvin (born Anna Frances Garvin; February 11, 1906 – July 7, 1994) was an American stage performer and film actress who worked in both the silent and sound eras. Before her retirement in 1942, she reportedly appeared in over 350 shorts and features for various Hollywood studios. Her best known roles are as supporting characters in Hal Roach comedies starring Laurel and Hardy and Charley Chase.

== Early life and stage career ==
Anna Frances Garvin was born in 1906 in New York City, the middle child of three children of Anne (née Donovan) and Edward J. Garvin, a native of North Carolina. "Stagestruck" as a child, her desire to become an entertainer was encouraged by two sisters who were members of another family living in the same apartment building as the Garvins. The sisters were also dancers in vaudeville. "They were very nice to me", recalled Garvin in a 1978 interview. "They'd teach me different steps and I would practice with them."

In 1918, only 12 years of age, she applied for a job as a bathing beauty in one of Mack Sennett's New York stage shows. When the casting agent asked her age, Garvin replied, "'Well, almost 16'". She got the job. The next year she joined the Ziegfeld Follies and later performed in The Earl Carroll Vanities. In 1920, she appeared on stage as "The Kirchner Girl", a 10-minute vaudeville act produced by Ernest Brengk.

The 14-year-old performer recreated the poses of women in seven different paintings by artist Ernst Ludwig Kirchner. For each simulated artwork, she was able to change costumes on stage by means of a curtain suspended between two columns. In its April 16, 1920 review of the act, the widely read trade paper Variety states, "Miss Garvin is a stunning looking brunet [sic] who has a corking figure, and is ideally suited for the act." She then appeared in Herman Timberg's Frolics of 1922 before joining a tour with the musical Sally. She performed in that show for two seasons, opting in 1924 to remain in California when the tour left the state for other scheduled venues.

In Hollywood, Garvin began working for Christie Film Company's comedies. She recalled her co-star Bobby Vernon dropping butter on the floor onto which she stepped and tumbled, cementing her career as a comedian. Charles Lamont brought her over to work for Educational Pictures. Then, in 1926, she was hired by Hal Roach Studios, where over the next several years she appeared in many silent shorts with Charley Chase, James Finlayson, Max Davidson, and Laurel and Hardy. She was also cast occasionally in supporting roles in features. A statuesque presence at 5' 9", "her regal countenance and deadpan expression" made her the perfect comic foil. Garvin continued to impress Roach with her talents and on-screen presence, so much so that he later ranked her as "one of his finest actresses." In a 1978 interview for an article in the Los Angeles Times, she reflects on her frequent work with Stan Laurel during that period:

One thing about Stan—with apologies to a lot of directors—they thought they were directing him. And they thought they were directing the picture. But Stan was the one...He was very clever about it. The director was never cognizant of the fact that he was not doing all the directing. Stan's mind was going all the time, always thinking of gags and things to do. The script didn't mean a thing.

Garvin appeared in a total of 11 Laurel and Hardy films. In 1928–29 she had her own starring series, teamed with fellow actress Marion Byron to perform as a distaff version of Stan and Ollie. The best-known of the three Garvin-Byron comedies is A Pair of Tights, an "acknowledged masterpiece" in which the girls go out on a double date with tightwads Edgar Kennedy and Stuart Erwin.

In the sound era, Garvin continued working in comedies produced at Educational, Warner Brothers/Vitaphone, RKO Radio Pictures, and Columbia Pictures. She continued to work as well in Laurel and Hardy shorts with Hal Roach, such as in the 1930 release Blotto in which she plays Stan's feisty wife. A decade later she performed in the 1940 Three Stooges short Cookoo Cavaliers, briefly appearing as a customer requesting a haddock.

== Personal life and death ==
On March 15, 1926 in Ventura, California, Garvin married Clement Beauchamp, a film actor and assistant unit director for Fox Film. They divorced in 1930, and the Los Angeles Times covered the related court proceedings. A witness for Garvin, according to the newspaper, testified that "she knew that Mrs. Beauchamp had to support herself" due to the lack of spousal assistance. Quoting Garvin herself, the newspaper in an August 6 new item shares her main reason for ending the four-year marriage:

"I had to make a living for both of us," said Mrs. Beauchamp. "My husband was supposed to be an actor, but he didn't act much at getting a job. I worked all the time we were married."

Later in 1930, after finalizing her divorce from Beauchamp, Garvin married Clifford "Red" Stanley, former trombonist with the Irving Aaronson orchestra and later music editor for a film studio. Their marriage lasted nearly 50 years, until Clifford's death in 1980. During the first decade of their marriage, Garvin continued to perform in films, but by 1942 she retired from acting to devote more time to raising the couple's two children. Decades after she left acting, moviegoers continued to remember and acknowledge Garvin's contributions to film history. The Sons of the Desert — an international fraternal organization devoted to the lives and films of Laurel and Hardy — honored her career at their membership meetings in 1978 and 1989.

Garvin died at the Motion Picture Country House and Hospital in Woodland Hills, California.

She is buried in section E of San Fernando Mission Cemetery in Mission Hills, California.

== Partial filmography ==
- The Last Man on Earth (1924)
- The Sleuth (1925)
- Raggedy Rose (1926)
- Bertha, the Sewing Machine Girl (1926)
- Why Girls Love Sailors (1927)
- With Love and Hisses (1927)
- Sailors Beware (1927)
- Hats Off (1927)
- The Valley of Hell (1927)
- The Battle of the Century (1927)
- From Soup to Nuts (1928)
- Their Purple Moment (1928)
- The Play Girl (1928)
- Fandango (1928)
- Night Watch (1928)
- Feed 'Em and Weep (1928, co-starred with Marion Byron)
- A Pair of Tights (1929, co-starred with Marion Byron)
- Going Ga-Ga (1929, co-starred with Marion Byron)
- Trent's Last Case (1929)
- Red Hot Rhythm (1929)
- Modern Love (1929)
- The Charlatan (1929)
- Blotto (1930)
- Whispering Whoopee (1930)
- Be Big! (1931)
- Los calaveras (1931)
- Yoo-Hoo (1932)
- Show Business (1932)
- Swiss Miss (1938)
- A Chump at Oxford (1940)
- Cookoo Cavaliers (1940)
