= Blotto (film) =

1930 film

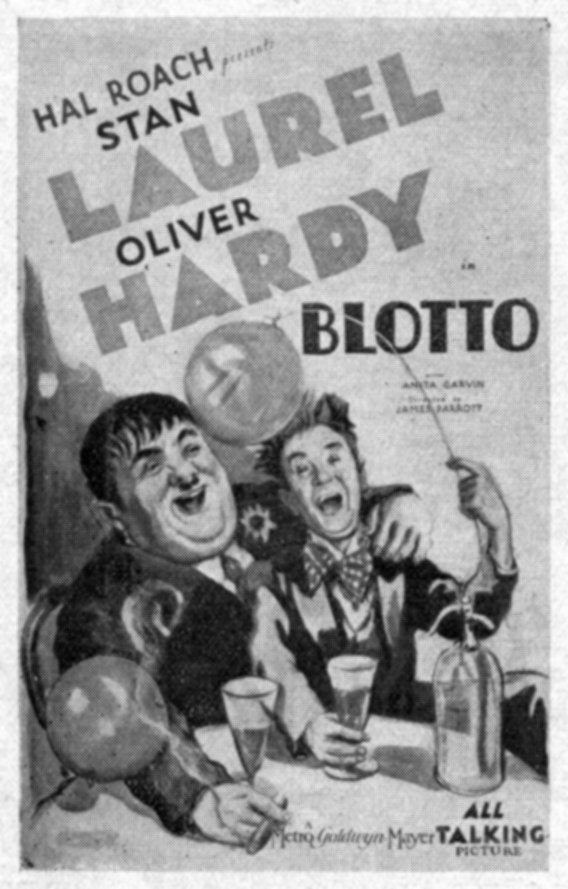
- Theatrical release poster
- Directed by: James Parrott
- Written by: Leo McCarey; H.M. Walker
- Produced by: Hal Roach
- Starring: Stan Laurel; Oliver Hardy
- Cinematography: George Stevens
- Edited by: Richard C. Currier; William H. Ziegler
- Music by: Nathaniel Shilkret; Leroy Shield (1937 reissue)
- Distributed by: Metro-Goldwyn-Mayer
- Release date: February 8, 1930
- Running time: 26:06 (English); 39:30 (Spanish)
- Country: United States
- Language: English

Blotto is a 1930 American pre-Code comedy film directed by James Parrott and starring Stan Laurel and Oliver Hardy. The short was produced by Hal Roach and originally distributed by Metro-Goldwyn-Mayer.

== Plot ==
During the Prohibition era, Laurel and Hardy plan an evening at the Rainbow Club, a lively venue. Stan, eager to escape his nagging wife, agrees to a scheme devised by Ollie to feign a business-related absence. However, their telephone conversation is overheard by Stan's wife, prompting her to enact her own plan.

Unbeknownst to Stan and Ollie, Mrs. Laurel replaces the hidden liquor in their home with tea spiked with various spices. At the club, the duo struggles to open their bottle quietly before resorting to enjoying the entertainment, including a Josephine Baker-style exotic dancer and a baritone singer whose melancholic performance moves Stan to tears.

Meanwhile, Mrs. Laurel, armed with a shotgun, arrives at the club and confronts the pair. They are acting as though drunk, but sober up when she reveals the contents of their bottle. Angered by their deception, she pursues them onto the street, where they flee in a taxi. In a fit of rage, Mrs. Laurel unleashes a single shot, obliterating the vehicle.

== Cast ==
- Stan Laurel as Stan
- Oliver Hardy as Ollie
- Anita Garvin as Mrs. Laurel
  - Linda Loredo as Mrs. Laurel (Spanish version)
  - Georgette Rhodes as Mrs. Laurel (French version)
- Baldwin Cooke as Waiter
- Dick Gilbert as Phone booth gawker
- Charlie Hall as Cabdriver
- Tiny Sandford as Waiter
- Jean De Briac as Shopkeeper
- Jack Hill in a bit part
- Symona Boniface as Lady who sits in wet chair (Spanish-language version only)
- Frank Holliday as Rainbow Club singer

== Production notes ==
The name of the film refers "to be blotto", still in use in British English (albeit archaic in US English), meaning to be drunk.

The initial release of Blotto did not incorporate a music score apart from the orchestral "Dance of the Cuckoos" tune played during the opening titles. The original version of the film is no longer extant, with only a censored 1937 re-release print surviving. This re-release edition underwent alterations, including the removal of approximately one reel of material containing pre-Code sequences.

To address the absence of a music score in the original release, a background music track was integrated into the 1937 version. This musical accompaniment comprised a combination of Leroy Shield's jazzy compositions and other musical selections commonly featured in 1937 Hal Roach films. A distinctive feature of Blotto is that it represents the sole Laurel and Hardy production where Laurel's character is married while Hardy's remains unmarried.

Although the original 1930 version is now considered a lost film, a Spanish language version produced right after the English version entitled La Vida Nocturna has survived. It shows how the film was originally presented, including a gag involving an electric fan after Stan says he needs some "fresh air". This is not available in the English version due to negative damage.

== International versions ==
The film was reshot and entitled La Vida Nocturna for the Spanish language market.
