= An Ache in Every Stake =

1941 American short film by Del Lord

- Directed by: Del Lord
- Written by: Lloyd French
- Produced by: Del Lord; Hugh McCollum
- Starring: Moe Howard; Larry Fine; Curly Howard; Vernon Dent; Bud Jamison; Gino Corrado; Bess Flowers; Blanche Payson; Symona Boniface
- Cinematography: Philip Tannura
- Edited by: Burton Kramer
- Distributed by: Columbia Pictures
- Release date: August 22, 1941 (U.S.)
- Running time: 18:09
- Country: United States
- Language: English

An Ache in Every Stake is a 1941 short subject directed by Del Lord starring American slapstick comedy team The Three Stooges (Moe Howard, Larry Fine and Curly Howard). It is the 57th entry in the series released by Columbia Pictures starring the comedians, who released 190 shorts for the studio between 1934 and 1959.

== Plot ==
The Stooges are hapless icemen who, upon awakening from slumber within their delivery wagon, find Curly embedded in a block of ice he had used as an improvised pillow. Moe and Larry break him out of it, and the three begin their routine ice block deliveries, culminating in a challenging assignment at a residence perched atop a daunting staircase.

The arduous ascent presents a formidable obstacle, complicated by the inexorable melting of the ice en route. Despite concerted efforts and repeated setbacks, during which they twice bump into the aggrieved Mr. Lawrence and ruin his cakes, the Stooges persevere in their delivery endeavors, albeit with characteristic ineptitude.

When the trio's antics cause the departure of the household staff, they assume the roles of servants, tasked with preparing a birthday dinner for the homeowner's husband. Unbeknownst to them, the husband in question is none other than Mr. Lawrence, whose prior encounters with the Stooges have left him less than enamored. Amidst their culinary exploits, characterized by misguided attempts at ice shaving and turkey stuffing, the Stooges unwittingly introduce foreign objects into the meal, eliciting consternation among the dinner guests. However, their pièce de résistance is a birthday cake ill-advisedly inflated with town gas. When Mr. Lawrence blows out the candles, the gas-filled cake explodes, and he angrily recognizes the new servants. The Stooges are forced to leave in a hurry, riding a flat board down the stairs, and tumbling off near the bottom.

== Cast ==
=== Credited ===
- Curly Howard as Curly
- Larry Fine as Larry
- Moe Howard as Moe

=== Uncredited ===
- Vernon Dent as Mr. Poindexter Lawrence
- Bess Flowers as Mrs. Lawrence
- Bud Jamison as baker
- Dorothy Vernon as ice customer
- Victor Travers as ice customer
- Blanche Payson as maid
- Gino Corrado as chef
- Symona Boniface as party guest
- Carl M. Leviness as party guest
- Dice as himself

== Production notes ==
Although similar in appearance, the long staircase seen in the film is not the same one used in Laurel and Hardy's lost film Hats Off (1927) nor the Academy Award-winning film The Music Box (1932). The stairs — 147 steps in length — are approximately two miles northeast, located at Fair Oak View Terrace and Edendale Place in the Silver Lake district of Los Angeles. Unlike the stairs in The Music Box, this stairway begins from a cul-de-sac. Filming was completed March 26–29, 1941.

Curly's turkey-stuffing scene was performed earlier by Shemp Howard in the 1934 film A Peach of a Pair and again by Shemp in the Stooges' 1952 film Listen, Judge.

The plot device of carrying ice up a flight of stairs derives from the Billy Bevan silent film Ice Cold Cocos (1926), also directed by Del Lord. According to the SilentEra website, Ice Cold Cocos used the same staircase as Hats Off and The Music Box (located in the Silver Lake area of Los Angeles on Vendome (923-937 Vendome) at Del Monte.

This is one of several Stooge shorts in which a sofa spring becomes attached to someone's backside. This gag was also used in Hoi Polloi, Three Little Sew and Sews, Hugs and Mugs and Have Rocket, Will Travel. The film marked the final appearance of supporting actress Bess Flowers with the Stooges.

An Ache in Every Stake is considered a quintessential Three Stooges film. Ranking as a consistent fan favorite, a colorized version was released in 2004 as part of the DVD collection "Stooged & Confoosed."
