= Dorothy Coburn =

American actress (1905–1978)

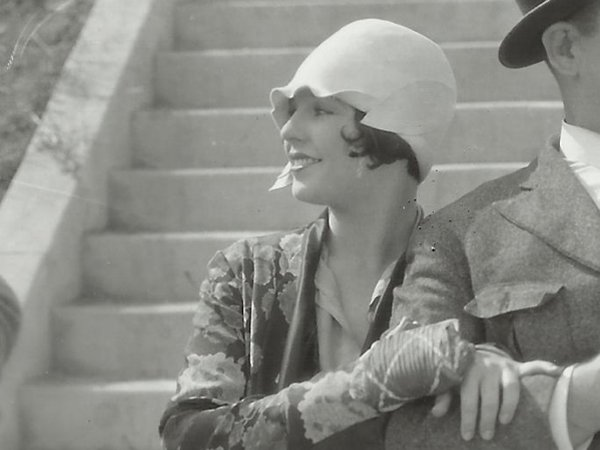
- Dorothy Coburn in Hats Off (1927)
- Born: Dorothy Montana Coburn; June 8, 1905; Great Falls, Montana, US
- Died: May 15, 1978 (aged 72)
- Resting place: Grand View Memorial Park Cemetery
- Occupation: Actress
- Spouse(s): Joseph Maier (Death 1959) Harry W. Heap (m. 1973)
- Relatives: Walt Coburn (Uncle)

Dorothy Montana Coburn (June 8, 1905 – May 15, 1978) was an American film actress who appeared in a number of early Laurel and Hardy silents. She was a niece of author Walt Coburn and granddaughter of Robert Coburn Sr., founder of the Circle C Ranch in Montana.

== Early years ==
Coburn was born to cowboy-poet and Western film producer Wallace Coburn and Ann Reifenrath Coburn in Great Falls, Montana but raised in Prescott, Arizona.

== Career ==
Coburn played ingenue leads and comedic roles. Her documented film repertoire consisted of 16 silent short subjects for the Hal Roach studios, and she appeared in scores of films as horseback-stuntwoman opposite such stars as Gary Cooper and Joel McCrea, and as a stand-in for Ginger Rogers in several of her dancing films with Fred Astaire. Coburn retired from the movie business in the early 1930s. Coburn occasionally worked as a stunt performer in westerns.

== Later years ==
After leaving the movie business in 1936, she found employment as a receptionist for an insurance company. She was married twice. Coburn died in 1978, aged 72, from emphysema. She is interred in Grand View Memorial Park Cemetery in Glendale, California.

Coburn was married three times. On November 29, 1930, she married B-western actor Gene Alsace (born Rockford G. Camron) in Los Angeles County; the marriage later ended in divorce. She was subsequently married to aerial surveyor Joseph Maier until his death from heart disease in Santa Barbara on March 4, 1959. In June 1973, she married her childhood sweetheart, Harry W. Heap, using her previous name Dorothy Maier on the marriage license. They remained married until her death in 1978. Before Coburn's death in 1978, the couple lived in Rancho Palos Verdes.

== Filmography ==
- The Battle of the Century (1927)
- Putting Pants on Philip (1927)
- Us (1927)
- Hats Off (1927)
- The Second Hundred Years (1927)
- Sailors, Beware! (1927)
- Sugar Daddies (1927)
- All for Geraldine (1928)
- The Cross Country Bunion Race (1928)
- Do Gentlemen Snore? (1928)
- Look Pleasant (1928)
- That Night (1928)
- Rubber Necks (1928)
- Should Married Men Go Home? (1928)
- Barnum & Ringling, Inc. (1928)
- From Soup to Nuts (1928)
- The Finishing Touch (1928)
- Flying Elephants (1928)
- Leave 'Em Laughing (1928)
- Playin' Hookey (1928)
- Sailor Suits (1929)
- Up and Down Stairs (1930)
- Hot – And How! (1930)
- Shivering Shakespeare (1930)
