= A Chump at Oxford =

1940 film by Alfred J. Goulding

- Theatrical release poster
- Directed by: Alfred J. Goulding
- Written by: Charley Rogers; Felix Adler; Harry Langdon
- Produced by: Hal Roach Jr. Hal Roach
- Starring: Stan Laurel; Oliver Hardy; Wilfred Lucas; Forrester Harvey; Peter Cushing; Charlie Hall
- Cinematography: Art Lloyd
- Edited by: Bert Jordan
- Music by: Marvin Hatley
- Production company: Hal Roach Studios
- Distributed by: United Artists
- Release date: February 16, 1940
- Running time: 42:02 (streamliner); 62:54 (extended)
- Country: United States
- Language: English
- Box office: $230,297

A Chump at Oxford is a Hal Roach comedy film produced in 1939 and released in 1940 by United Artists. It was directed by Alfred J. Goulding and is the penultimate Laurel and Hardy film made at the Roach studio. The title echoes the film A Yank at Oxford (1938), of which it is a partial parody.

== Plot ==
Stan and Ollie are street sweepers who, while taking a lunch break outside a bank, accidentally foil a bank robber's escape. The grateful bank president offers them jobs, but Ollie admits that they haven't enough education to succeed. The bank president pays for scholarships at Oxford University in England, where they are victimized with elaborate hazing by prankish students.

The servant assigned to Stan and Ollie recognizes Stan as the long-lost athlete and scholar Lord Paddington. Many years before, the scholar received a bump on the head which claimed his memory. He wandered away from the university, never to be seen again. Stan and Ollie dismiss the story and continue their misadventures. When Stan manages to bump his head, he immediately transforms into Lord Paddington, complete with upper-crust diction and condescending manner. Hardy, astonished, is permitted to stay on as Paddington's "lackey."

The students who had hazed Stan and Ollie now face expulsion, and they form an angry mob determined to run Stan and Ollie out of Oxford. They do not reckon on Paddington, who singlehandedly routs the mob. Paddington looks out the window, and the window frame slips and bumps his head. Stan returns, oblivious to what has happened.

== Cast ==
- Stan Laurel as Stan/Lord Paddington
- Oliver Hardy as Ollie
- Forrester Harvey as Meredith
- Wilfred Lucas as Dean Williams
- Forbes Murray as Banker
- Frank Baker as Dean's Servant
- Eddie Borden as Student Ghost
- Gerald Rogers as Student Johnson
- Charles Hall as Student
- Victor Kendall as Student
- Gerald Fielding as Student
- Peter Cushing as Student

Also seen in the extended version:

- James Finlayson as Mr. Vanderveer, party host
- Anita Garvin as Mrs. Vanderveer, party hostess
- Vivien Oakland as Employment Agent
- Harry Bernard as Policeman

== Production ==
A Chump at Oxford was originally conceived as a streamliner featurette. The completed film ran 42 minutes in length. Roach's distributor, United Artists, rejected the featurette and insisted on a full-length feature film, forcing Roach to add 21 more minutes of action. The added scenes, partially reworking the silent film From Soup to Nuts (1928), show Laurel and Hardy trying to find work at an employment agency, and accepting temporary jobs as maid and butler at a society party. The party becomes a shambles, and the sequence fades out. The next scene fades in where the original storyline began, with Laurel & Hardy as street sweepers.

The shorter version was shelved, and the longer version was released to theaters and later to television; this 63-minute print is the version most often seen today. The shorter version was ultimately released to theaters in 1943. A later reissue was further reedited, jumping abruptly from when Stan and Ollie enter the employment agency to when they are sweeping the streets. A 25-minute version created for television distribution is entitled Alter Ego.

As Lord Paddington, Stan Laurel employs an upper-class received pronunciation accent, the only time when he affected a voice different from "Stan" on film.

== Reception ==
In a contemporary review for The New York Times, critic Bosley Crowther wrote:

Let's not mince words with custard pies—or what theoretically amounts to the same: The slapstick clowning of Laurel and Hardy in Hal Roach's 'A Chump at Oxford' ... is about as silly and unintelligent as a lecture in double-talk, and also about as funny as clowns can be these days. After all. the secret of slapstick resides in incongruity, and what could be more incongruous than these dead-panned stumblebums—ex-street cleaners in this case—turned loose amid the gray towers and ivy-covered walls of peaceful Oxford? ... The idea is to laugh, not to think. You'll get the idea, all right.

The Hollywood Reporter noted: "Laurel and Hardy are back, not quite at the peak of their two-reeler form in Chump at Oxford but this 63-minute comedy is considerably better than the last half-dozen efforts of the team. [These recent films forced the team to share the footage with romantic subplots.] The boys are given their heads in a story that is entirely about them, and they take it to town in a manner that will unquestionably please their loyal following."

Leonard Maltin wrote, "So-called feature is more like a series of barely related shorts; film is nearly half over before L&H even get to Oxford. Still quite funny, especially when they settle down in the Dean's quarters." Leslie Halliwell gave it two of four stars: "Patchy but endearing Laurel and Hardy romp, starting with an irrelevant two reels about their playing butler and maid, but later including Stan's burlesque impersonation of Lord Paddington."
