= Chet Brandenburg =

American actor and stuntman (1897–1974)

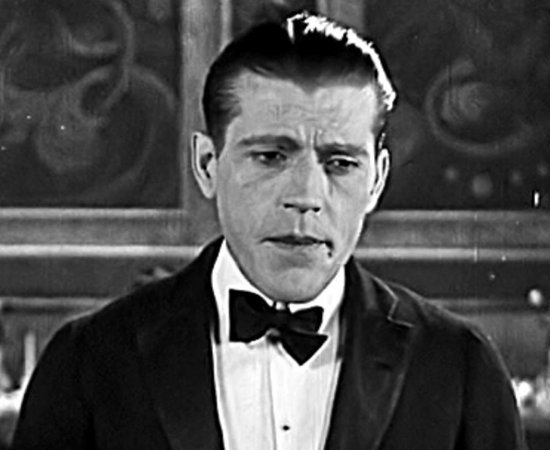
- Brandenburg in Love 'em and Weep (1927)
- Born: James Chester Brandenburg; October 15, 1897; Peoria, Illinois, U.S.
- Died: July 17, 1974 (aged 76); Woodland Hills, California, U.S.
- Resting place: Forest Lawn Memorial Park - Hollywood Hills Cemetery
- Occupation: Actor
- Years active: 1922–1968
- Relatives: Ed Brandenburg (brother)

James Chester Brandenburg (October 15, 1897 – July 17, 1974) was an American actor and stuntman. He appeared in 436 films and television programs between 1924 and 1968.

== Biography ==
Brandenburg appeared on the CBS TV western series Gunsmoke, in numerous uncredited roles, including as a townsman in the 1960 episode “The Blacksmith” (S6E2), the 1962 episode “False Front” (S18E15) & the 1963 episode “Kate Heller” (S9E1); as a party guest in the episode “Say Uncle” (S6 E4).

Brandenburg was interred in Forest Lawn Memorial Park, Hollywood Hills, California.

== Selected filmography ==
- Wide Open Spaces (1924)
- Official Officers (1925)
- Good Cheer (1926)
- War Feathers (1926)
- With Love and Hisses (1927)
- Putting Pants on Philip (1927)
- Playin' Hookey (1928)
- You're Darn Tootin' (1928)
- Should Married Men Go Home? (1928)
- Two Tars (1928)
- Cat, Dog & Co. (1929)
- When the Wind Blows (1930)
- Be Big! (1931)
- Pack Up Your Troubles (1932)
- Sons of the Desert (1933)
- The Pinch Singer (1936)
- The Adventures of Robin Hood (1938)
- Dodge City (1939)
- They Drive By Night (1940)
- The Remarkable Andrew (1942)
- The Ghost of Frankenstein (1942)
- Jitterbugs (1943)
- Hers to Hold (1943)
- Wing and a Prayer (1944)
- The Harvey Girls (1946)
- The Kid from Brooklyn (1946)
- The Sea of Grass (1947)
- Nightmare Alley (1947)
- Station West (1948)
- White Heat (1949) - Convict (uncredited)
- The Yellow Cab Man (1950)
- The Asphalt Jungle (1950)
- The Red Badge of Courage (1951)
- The Big Trees (1952)
- Hans Christian Andersen (1952)
- The War of the Worlds (1953) - Man in Church (uncredited)
- Calamity Jane (1953)
- 20,000 Leagues Under the Sea (1954) - Sailor (uncredited)
- Seven Men from Now (1956)
- The Spirit of St. Louis (1957)
- The Sheepman (1958)
- The Young Philadelphians (1959)
- North to Alaska (1960)
- Judgment at Nuremberg (1961)
- The Man Who Shot Liberty Valance (1962)
- Ride the High Country (1962)
