= Randy Skretvedt =

American journalist

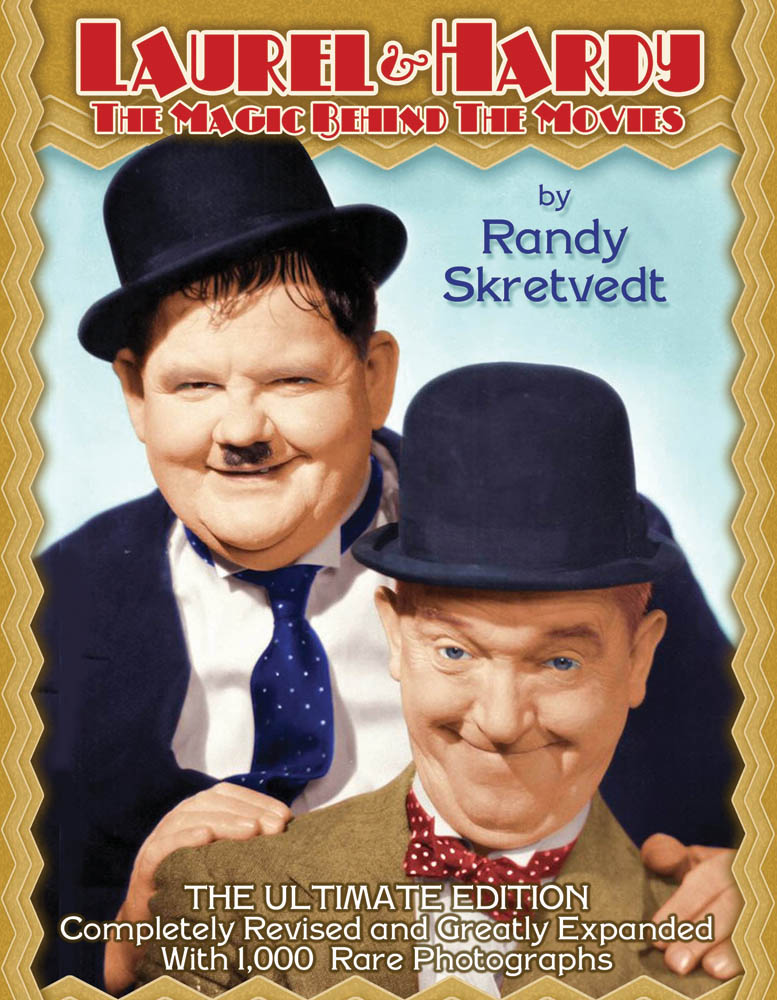

Randy Skretvedt (born November 1958) is an American film and music scholar, author, lecturer and broadcaster. His 1987 book Laurel and Hardy: The Magic Behind the Movies (updated in 1996) is the reference standard for Laurel and Hardy fans. In 2016, Skretvedt put the book through a massive update and enhancement, retitling it LAUREL AND HARDY: THE MAGIC BEHIND THE MOVIES (ULTIMATE EDITION) and publishing it through Bonaventure Press as an oversized 8-1/2 x 11 hardcover book, increasing the text by 50% and quadrupling the number of pictures included. Early supporters of the Kickstarter campaign for this edition also received a custom audio CD of selected excerpts from Mr. Skretvedt's interviews with Laurel and Hardy colleagues and co-workers.

Skretvedt is also the host of the radio show Forward Into the Past, which airs weekly on KSPC-FM in Claremont, California (88.7-FM and KSPC online). His nom de heterodyne is Randy Brian.

== Early years ==
Skretvedt's interests in vintage media started in childhood and range across the board, including films, music and radio. His primary area of focus is the period between the world wars: the 1920s, '30s and '40s. His penchant for collecting was evident early on; even as a child he began acquiring books, records, memorabilia, rare photos, letters, ephemera, documents – even Super 8mm prints of classic film comedies.

He was a precocious communicator: his professional writing began at just 16, when he wrote a series of articles for Private Screenings, a magazine devoted to vintage movies.

== Young Turk in the Sons ==
It was only natural that a Laurel and Hardy fan with an interest the intensity of Skretvedt's would find his way to The Sons of the Desert, the international appreciation society for the duo. Skretvedt joined as a young teen and immediately recognized that the surviving members of Laurel and Hardy casts and crews were not going to be around forever, so he commenced interviewing them and cultivating the "inside stories" that would become the backbone of his work.

Although he came along too late to interview either Laurel or Hardy, Skretvedt did debrief Oliver Hardy's widow, Stan Laurel's daughter, actors Anita Garvin and Dorothy Granger, music director Marvin Hatley, effects chief Roy Seawright, film editor Richard Currier and many, many other of their co-stars, directors and technicians. Perhaps his crowning interview – certainly in prestige if not necessarily in the forthrightness of its subject – was with Hal Roach, studio boss of "The Lot Of Fun," Roach Studios, where "The Boys" did all their best work. Skretvedt had not a moment to spare in his archival work: most everyone who worked directly with Laurel and Hardy in any capacity has since died.

== Music authority and music collector ==
Skretvedt's interest in the popular culture from the first half of the 20th century doesn't end with film and cinema; he is also a fan of, and an authority on, the music of the time. His activities as a determined collector extend into the musical realm as well.

He is proud of his "Barn Full O’ Records", which is a carpeted and air-conditioned private archive dedicated to musical artifacts from the early 1900s to the 1960s. Barn Full O'Records contains shelves of organized 78 rpm records, additional stacks of CDs, tapes, as well as 33 rpm and 45 rpm records, and the vast array of apparatus needed to play them all back. Skretvedt estimates the collection includes over 30,000 recordings.

== Broadcaster ==
Skretvedt's vast music archive performs a public service function: it provides the playlist for Forward Into The Past, the weekly radio program that Skretvedt hosts under the moniker Randy Brian. The three-hour program features two hours of primarily '20s, '30s and '40s music – mostly jazzy danceband numbers and some novelty records – flanking a central hour of vintage radio, comedy or drama. The program debuted in 1982.

Forward Into The Past airs Sunday afternoons at 2 pm (PT) on KSPC 88.7 FM in Claremont, California and online at kspc.org.
