= Edgar Kennedy =

American actor (1890–1948)

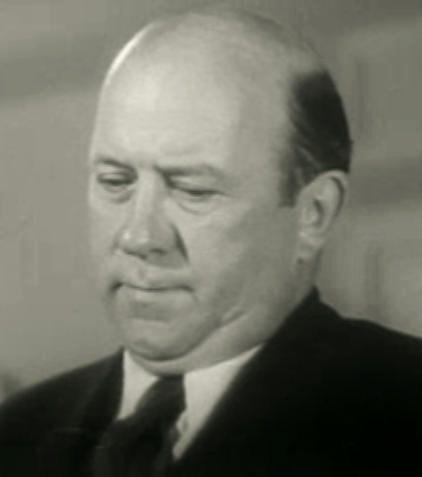
- Kennedy in Everything's on Ice (1939)
- Born: Edgar Livingston Kennedy; April 26, 1890; Monterey County, California, U.S.
- Died: November 9, 1948 (aged 58); Woodland Hills, California, U.S.
- Resting place: Holy Cross Cemetery, Culver City, California, U.S.
- Occupation: Actor
- Years active: 1911–1948
- Spouse: Patricia Violet Allwyn (m. 1924)

Edgar Livingston Kennedy (April 26, 1890 – November 9, 1948) was an American comedic character actor who appeared in at least 500 films during the silent and sound eras. Professionally, he was known as "Slow Burn", owing to his ability to portray characters whose anger slowly rose in frustrating situations.

In many of his roles, he used exasperated facial expressions and performed very deliberately to convey his rising anger or "burn", often rubbing his hand over his bald head and across his face in an effort to control his temper. One memorable example of his comedy technique can be seen in the 1933 Marx Brothers' film Duck Soup, where he plays a sidewalk lemonade vendor who is harassed and increasingly provoked by Harpo and Chico.

== Early years ==
Kennedy was born April 26, 1890, in Monterey County, California, to Canadians Neil Kennedy and Annie Quinn. He attended San Rafael High School before taking up boxing. After boxing, he worked as a singer in vaudeville, musical comedy and light opera.

== Film career ==
After making his debut in 1911, Kennedy performed with some of Hollywood's biggest comedians, including Roscoe Arbuckle, Charlie Chaplin, Laurel and Hardy, the Marx Brothers, W.C. Fields, Charley Chase and Our Gang. He was also one of the original Keystone Cops.

Kennedy's burly frame originally suited him for villainous or threatening roles in silent pictures. By the 1920s, he was working for producer Hal Roach, who kept him busy playing supporting roles in short comedies. He starred in one short, A Pair of Tights (1928), where he plays a tightwad determined to spend as little as possible on a date. His antics with comedian Stuart Erwin are reminiscent of Roach's Laurel and Hardy comedies, produced concurrently. Kennedy also directed half a dozen of Roach's two-reel comedies.

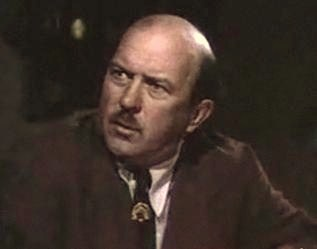
Kennedy in A Star Is Born, (1937)

In 1930, RKO-Pathe featured Kennedy in a pair of short-subject comedies, Next Door Neighbors and Help Wanted, Female. His characterization of a short-tempered householder was so effective, RKO built a series around him. The "Average Man" comedies starred Kennedy as a blustery, stubborn everyman determined to accomplish a household project or get ahead professionally, despite the meddling of his featherbrained wife (usually Florence Lake), her freeloading brother (originally William Eugene, then Jack Rice) and his dubious mother-in-law (Dot Farley). Kennedy pioneered the kind of domestic situation comedy that later became familiar on television. Each installment ended with Kennedy embarrassed, humbled or defeated, looking at the camera and doing his patent slow burn. The Edgar Kennedy Series, with its theme song "Chopsticks", became a standard part of the moviegoing experience. He made six "Average Man" shorts a year for 17 years. In 1938, he worked as a straight man for British comedian Will Hay in Hey! Hey! USA.

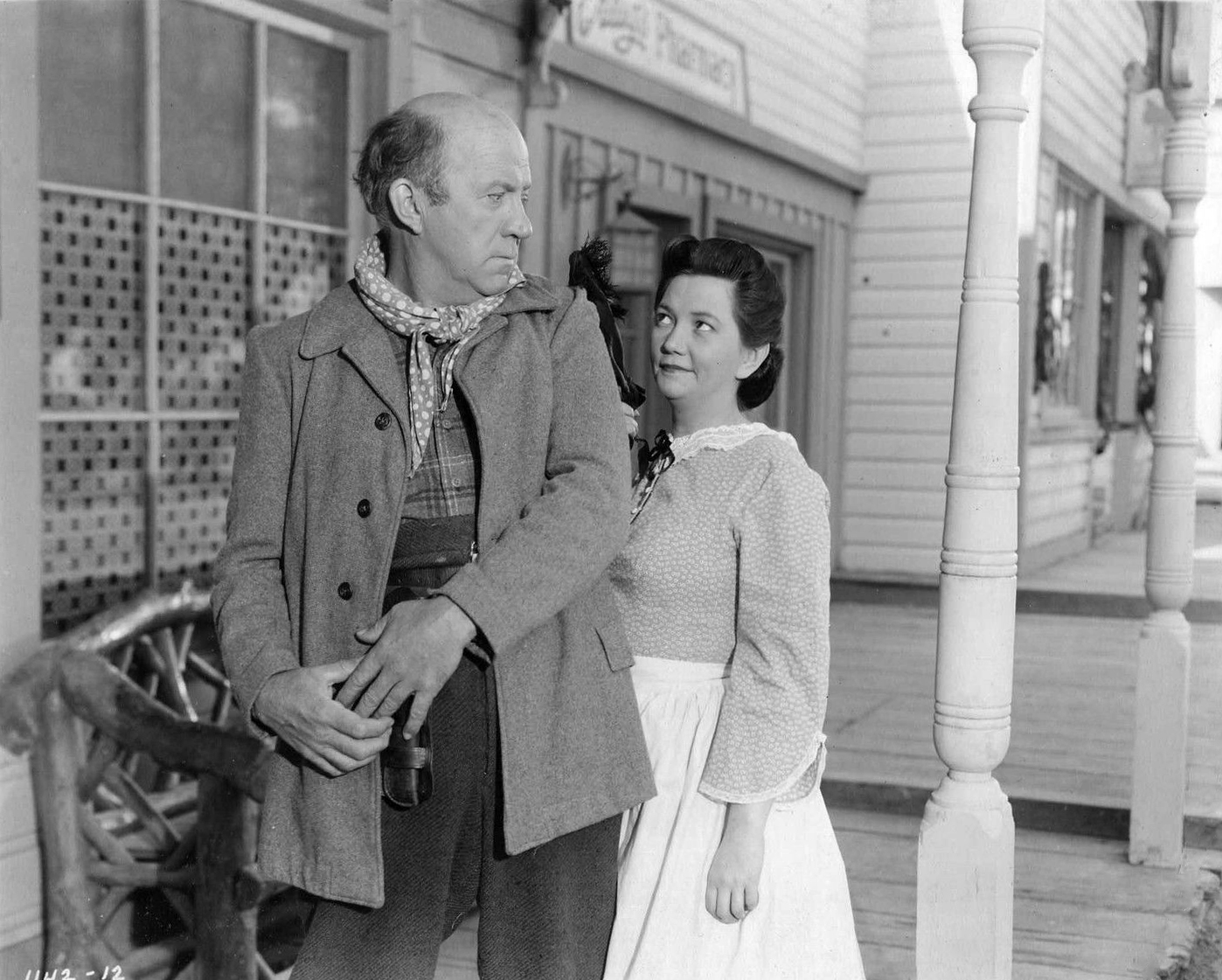
Kennedy and Patsy Kelly in In Old California, (1942)

Kennedy became so identified with frustration that practically every studio hired him to play hotheads. He often played dumb cops, detectives, and even a prison warden; sometimes he was a grouchy moving man, truck driver, or blue-collar workman. His character usually lost his temper at least once. In Diplomaniacs, he presides over an international tribunal where Wheeler & Woolsey want to do something about world peace. "Well, ya can't do anything about it here," yells Kennedy, "This is a peace conference!" Kennedy, established as the poster boy for frustration, even starred in an instructional film titled The Other Fellow, where he played a loudmouthed roadhog venting his anger on other drivers (each played by Kennedy as well), little realizing that, to them, he is "the other fellow."

Perhaps his most unusual roles were as a puppeteer in the detective mystery The Falcon Strikes Back, and as a philosophical bartender inspired to create exotic cocktails in Harold Lloyd's last film, The Sin of Harold Diddlebock (1947). He also played comical detectives opposite two titans of acting: John Barrymore, in Twentieth Century (1934); and Rex Harrison, in Unfaithfully Yours (1948). In the latter, he tells Harrison's character, a symphony conductor, "Nobody handles Handel like you handle Handel."

== Death ==
Kennedy died of throat cancer at the Motion Picture Hospital, San Fernando Valley on November 9, 1948. Tom Kennedy (no relation) and Charles Coburn spoke at the funeral service held at St. Gregory's Church, with Chester Conklin, Jimmy Finlayson, Del Lord and Billy Gilbert among the mourners. Kennedy was interred at the Holy Cross Cemetery, Culver City, Los Angeles County, California.

== Selected filmography ==
As actor:

- Brown of Harvard (1911, Short) as Claxton Madden
- Hoffmeyer's Legacy (1912, Short) as Keystone Kop (uncredited)
- The Bangville Police (1913, Short) as 3rd Deputy (in straw hat)
- The Star Boarder (1914, Short) as Landlady's Husband
- The Knockout (1914, Short) as Cyclone Flynn (uncredited)
- Tillie's Punctured Romance (1914) as Restaurant Owner / Butler (uncredited)
- The Stolen Triumph (1916) as Edwin Rowley, Jr.
- His Bitter Pill (1916) as Diamond Dan
- The Blue Streak (1917)
- Watch Your Neighbor (1918)
- Mickey (1918) as Stage Driver / Bookie (uncredited)
- Yankee Doodle in Berlin (1919) as German Prison Guard (uncredited)
- Daredevil Jack (1920)
- Puppets of Fate (1921) as Mike Reynolds
- Skirts (1921)
- The Leather Pushers (1922) as Ptomaine Tommy
- Bell Boy 13 (1923) as Chef (uncredited)
- The Little Girl Next Door (1923) as Hank Hall
- The Night Message (1924) as Lem Beeman
- The Battling Fool (1924 as Dan O'Leary
- Racing for Life (1924) as Tom Grady
- Paths to Paradise (1925) as Detective (uncredited)
- The Trouble with Wives (1925) as Detective
- The Golden Princess (1925) as Gewilliker Hay
- The People vs. Nancy Preston (1925) as Gloomy Gus
- His People (1925) as Thomas Nolan
- Oh What a Nurse! (1926) as Eric Johnson
- My Old Dutch (1926) as Bill Sproat
- Across the Pacific (1926) as Cpl. Ryan
- The Better 'Ole (1926) as Cpl. Austin
- Going Crooked (1926) as Detective
- Finger Prints (1927) as O.K. McDuff
- The Gay Old Bird (1927) as Chauffeur
- The Wrong Mr. Wright (1927) as Trayguard
- Wedding Bills (1927) as Detective
- The Chinese Parrot (1927) as Maydorf
- Leave 'Em Laughing (1928, Short) (First appearance with Laurel and Hardy)
- The Finishing Touch (1928, Short) as Policeman (credited as Ed Kennedy)
- Two Tars (1928, Short) as Motorist
- Trent's Last Case (1929) as Inspector Murch
- Unaccustomed As We Are (1929) as Mr. Kennedy
- Perfect Day (1929, Short) as Uncle Edgar
- They Had to See Paris (1929) as Ed Eggers (uncredited)
- Welcome Danger (1929) as SFPD Desk Sergeant (uncredited)
- Night Owls (1930, Short) as Officer Kennedy
- Quick Millions (1931) as Cop (uncredited)
- Bad Company (1931) as Buffington – Doorman
- The Carnival Boat (1932) as Baldy
- Westward Passage (1932) as Elmer
- Hold 'Em Jail (1932) as Warden Elmer Jones
- Little Orphan Annie (1932) as Daddy Warbucks
- Rockabye (1932) as Water Wagon-Driver (uncredited)
- The Penguin Pool murder (1932) as Donovan
- Scarlet River (1933) as Sam Gilroy
- Diplomaniacs (1933) as chairman – Peace Conference
- Son of the Border (1933) as Windy
- Cross Fire (1933) as Ed Wimpy
- Professional Sweetheart (1933) as Tim Kelsey
- Good Housewrecking (1933, Short) as Mr. Kennedy
- Tillie and Gus (1933) as Judge
- Duck Soup (1933) as Lemonade Vendor
- King for a Night (1933) as Cop (uncredited)
- All of Me (1934) as Guard (uncredited)
- Heat Lightning (1934) as Herbert – the Husband
- Twentieth Century (1934) as McGonigle
- Operator 13 (1934) as Confederate Officer Jealous of Artilleryman (uncredited)
- Murder on the Blackboard (1934) as Detective Donahue
- Money Means Nothing (1934) as Herbert Green
- We're Rich Again (1934) as Healy, Process Server
- Bachelor Bait (1934) (scenes deleted)
- King Kelly of the U.S.A. (1934) as Happy Moran
- Gridiron Flash (1934) as Officer Thurston
- Kid Millions (1934) as Herman Wilson
- The Marines Are Coming (1934) as Sgt. Buck Martin
- Flirting with Danger (1934) as Jimmie Pierson
- The Silver Streak (1934) as Dan O'Brien
- Affairs of a Gentleman (1934)
- Rendezvous at Midnight (1935) as Mahoney
- Living on Velvet (1935) as Counterman
- The Cowboy Millionaire (1935) as Willy Persimmon Bates
- Woman Wanted (1935) as Sweeney
- Little Big Shot (1935) as Onderdonk
- 1,000 Dollars a Minute (1935) as Police Officer McCarthy
- In Person (1935) as Man (uncredited)
- The Bride Comes Home (1935) as Henry
- It's Up to You (1936) as Elmer Block
- The Return of Jimmy Valentine (1936) as Callahan
- Will Power (1936, Short) as Himself
- The Robin Hood of El Dorado (1936) as Sheriff Judd
- Small Town Girl (1936) as Captain Mack
- Fatal Lady (1936) as Rudolf Hochstetter
- San Francisco (1936) as Sheriff
- Yours for the Asking (1936) as Bicarbonate
- Mad Holiday (1936) as Donovan
- Three Men on a Horse (1936) as Harry
- Dummy Ache (1936)
- When's Your Birthday? (1937) as Mr. Basscombe
- The Other Fellow (1937 film) (1937, Short) as Various Roles
- A Star Is Born (1937) as Pop Randall
- Super-Sleuth (1937) as Police Lt. Garrison
- Double Wedding (1937) as Spike
- Hollywood Hotel (1937) as Callaghan
- True Confession (1937) as Darsey
- The Black Doll (1938) as Sheriff Renick
- Scandal Sheet (1938) as Daniel Webster Smith
- Peck's Bad Boy with the Circus (1938) as Arthur Bailey
- Hey! Hey! USA (1938) as Bugs Leary
- It's a Wonderful World (1939) as Police Lieutenant Miller
- Everything's on Ice (1939) as Joe Barton
- Little Accident (1939) as Paper Hanger
- Laugh it Off (1939) as Judge John J. McGuinnis
- Charlie McCarthy, Detective (1939) as Inspector Dailey
- Sandy Is a Lady (1940) as Officer Rafferty
- Dr. Christian Meets the Women (1940) as George Browning
- The Bride Wore Crutches (1940) as Police Captain McGuire
- Margie (1940) as Chauncey
- The Quarterback (1940) as Pops
- Who Killed Aunt Maggie? (1940) as Sheriff Gregory
- Sandy Gets Her Man (1940) as Fire Chief Galvin
- Li'l Abner (1940) as Cornelius Cornpone
- Remedy for Riches (1940) as George Browning
- Too Many Blondes (1941) as Hotel Manager (uncredited)
- Blondie in Society (1941) as Doctor
- Public Enemies (1941) as Biff
- Private Snuffy Smith (1942) as Sergeant Ed Cooper
- Pardon My Stripes (1942) as Warden Bingham
- In Old California (1942) as Kegs McKeever
- There's One Born Every Minute (1942) as Mayor Moe Carson
- Hillbilly Blitzkrieg (1942) as Sgt. Homer Gatling
- The Crime Smasher (1943) as Police Chief Murphy
- Hold Your Temper (1943, Short) as Himself
- The Falcon Strikes Back (1943) as Smiley Dugan
- Air Raid Wardens (1943) as Joe Bledsoe
- Hitler's Madman (1943) as Nepomuk – the Hermit
- The Girl from Monterrey (1943) as Doc Hogan, Fight Promoter
- Crazy House (1943) as Judge
- It Happened Tomorrow (1944) as Inspector Mulrooney
- Radio Rampage (1944, Short) as Himself
- The Great Alaskan Mystery (1944, Serial) as Bosun Higgins
- Anchors Aweigh (1945) as Police Captain
- Captain Tugboat Annie (1945) as Captain Bullwinkle
- It's Your Move (1945, Short) as Himself
- You Drive Me Crazy (1945, Short) as Himself
- The Sin of Harold Diddlebock (1947) (a.k.a. Mad Wednesday) as Jake the Bartender
- Television Turmoil (1947, Short) as Himself
- Heaven Only Knows (1947) as Judd
- Unfaithfully Yours (1948) as Detective Sweeney
- My Dream Is Yours (1949) as Uncle Charlie (final film role)

As director:

- From Soup to Nuts (1928) — Laurel and Hardy two-reeler (silent)
- You're Darn Tootin' (1928) — Laurel and Hardy two-reeler (silent)
- All Teed Up (1930) — Charley Chase short comedy
