= Sam Lufkin =

American actor (1891–1952)

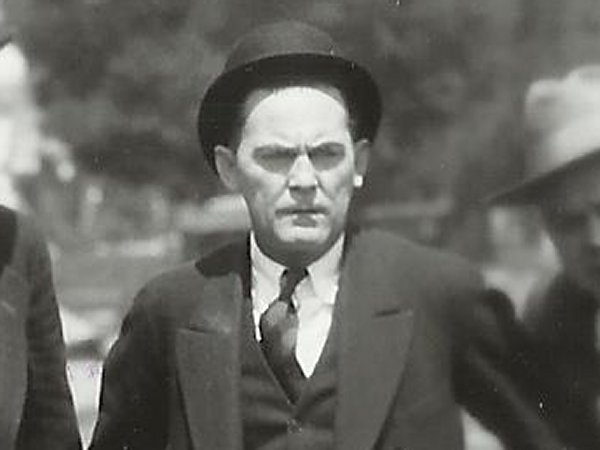
- Born: Samuel William Lufkin; May 8, 1891; Salt Lake City, Utah, U.S.
- Died: February 19, 1952 (aged 60); Hollywood, Los Angeles, California, U.S.
- Occupation: Actor
- Years active: 1920–1951

Samuel William Lufkin (May 8, 1891 – February 19, 1952) was an American actor. He was known for appearing in small or bit roles in short comedy films.

== Career ==
Born in Utah, Lufkin spent most of his career at the Hal Roach Studios where he made over 60 films. In over half of these, he appeared alongside Laurel and Hardy, mostly in small parts, but occasionally in more substantial roles such as an irascible cop inThe Music Box, or an irate motorist in Two Tars. After Laurel and Hardy left Roach in 1940, the grim-faced Lufkin mostly appeared in further bit roles in Hollywood feature films before his death of uremia in 1952. His grave is located at Pierce Brothers Valhalla Memorial Park.

== Selected filmography ==
Year	Title	Role	Notes
1920	Haunted Spooks	Bearded Man in Car	Uncredited
1923	A Man About Town	Bit Role	Uncredited
1924	High Society	Police detective	
1926	Thundering Fleas	Extra at the wedding	
1926	The Nickel-Hopper	Dance hall extra	Uncredited
1927	Sugar Daddies	Fun House ticket taker	
1928	Playin' Hookey	Keystone-ish cop	
1928	You're Darn Tootin'	Man outside restaurant	
1929	That's My Wife	Waiter	Uncredited
1929	Double Whoopee	Man poked in eye	
1930	Part Time Wife	Caddie Master	
1931	Pardon Us	Bit Part	Uncredited
1932	Any Old Port!	Referee	Uncredited
1932	The Music Box	Police Officer	Uncredited
1933	Sons of the Desert	First Waiter	Uncredited
1934	Going Bye-Bye!	Man with warning	
1935	Bonnie Scotland	Native henchman	Uncredited
1936	Our Relations	Waiter	Uncredited
1937	Grips, Grunts and Groans	Bit Part	Uncredited
1938	Block-Heads	Veteran	Uncredited
1939	Zenobia	Townsman	Uncredited
1940	A Chump at Oxford	Water wagon driver	Uncredited
1940	Saps at Sea	Workman at Horn Factory	Uncredited
1946	Crack-Up	Detective	Uncredited
1946	Sister Kenny	Photographer	Uncredited
1946	Lady Luck	Gambler	Uncredited
1947	Born to Kill	Crap Dealer	Uncredited
1947	Riffraff	Bit Role	Uncredited
1948	The Miracle of the Bells	Man	Uncredited
1950	Born to Be Bad	Taxi Driver	Uncredited
1951	Law of the Badlands	Bank Teller	Uncredited
