= A Lad an' a Lamp =

1932 Our Gang short film

- Directed by: Robert F. McGowan
- Produced by: Robert F. McGowan; Hal Roach
- Cinematography: Art Lloyd
- Edited by: Richard C. Currier
- Music by: Leroy Shield; Marvin Hatley
- Distributed by: Metro-Goldwyn-Mayer
- Release date: December 17, 1932
- Running time: 16' 51"
- Country: United States
- Language: English

A Lad an' a Lamp is a 1932 Our Gang short comedy film directed by Robert F. McGowan. It was the 119th Our Gang short to be released. The film has been criticized as containing racist humor.

== Plot ==
Fascinated by the story of Aladdin and his magic lamp, the gang gather together with several gasoline and kerosene lamps and lanterns and a few electric lamps hoping that by rubbing them vigorously, a genie will appear. Thanks to a series of coincidences—not least of which involves a friendly stage magician—the kids become convinced that they have succeeded in invoking Aladdin. But their excitement turns to dismay when Stymie believes Spanky has transformed his kid brother Cotton into a monkey (chimpanzee).

== Cast ==
=== The Gang ===
- Matthew Beard as Stymie
- Dorothy DeBorba as Dorothy
- Bobby Hutchins as Wheezer
- George McFarland as Spanky
- Dickie Moore as Dick
- Bobbie Beard as Cotton
- Georgie Billings as Georgie
- Dickie Jackson as Dickie
- John Collum as Uh-huh
- Bobby DeWar as Our Gang member
- Henry Hanna as Our Gang member
- Pete the Pup as himself

=== Additional cast ===
- Donald Haines as Toughie
- Harry Bernard as Officer / Store proprietor (scene deleted)
- Dick Gilbert as Officer / Dick, construction worker
- Jack Hill as Audience member / Officer
- Florence Hoskins as Cook's girlfriend
- James C. Morton as Officer
- Lillian Rich as Introductory narrator
- Philip Sleeman as The Magician
- Charley Young - Fruit vendor
- Jiggs the Chimpanzee as himself
- Harry Bowen as Audience member
- Efe Jackson as Pedestrian
- Jim Mason - Audience member

== Cast notes ==
Bobby Hutchins returns to the fold after missing Hook and Ladder, Free Wheeling, and Birthday Blues.

== Critique ==
Despite a sequence in which Spanky enjoys a free meal at a lunch counter, courtesy of a trained monkey, A Lad an' a Lamp has been criticized as containing racist humor that seems inappropriate when viewed in the 21st century. For this reason, A Lad an' a Lamp has been withdrawn from the "Little Rascals" television package. It is currently available in its entirety on VHS and DVD.

== See also ==
- Our Gang filmography
