= Obey the Law =

Obey the Law may refer to:

- Obey the Law (1926 film), a silent film adventure-drama
- Obey the Law (1933 film), an American Pre-Code crime drama film
