= Roaring Lion =

Roaring Lion or The Roaring Lion may refer to:

- Roaring Lion (calypsonian) (1908–1999), Trinidadian calypsonian
- Roaring Lion (horse) (2015–2019), Thoroughbred racehorse
- Roaring Lion River, River on the South Island of New Zealand
- The Roaring Lion, 1941 photograph of Winston Churchill
- The Roaring Lion (sculpture), Memorial sculpture in northern Israel
- Roaring Lions FC, association football club in Anguilla
- Roaring Lions at Home, 1924 American silent short film
- 2026 Iran war, codenamed "Operation Roaring Lion" by Israel
