= Estelle Etterre =

American actress (1899–1996)

- Born: July 26, 1899; San Francisco, California, U.S.
- Died: March 7, 1996 (aged 96); Newport Beach, California, U.S.
- Other names: Belle Hare, Estelle Eterre, Estelle Ettaire
- Occupation: Actress
- Years active: 1931–1962
- Spouse(s): Donald Hyde Clough (1943–1963) (divorced); Josef Werner Makk Jr. (1920–1925) (his death)

Estelle Etterre (sometimes billed as Belle Hare; July 26, 1899 – March 7, 1996) was an American actress. She appeared in many early 1930s Hal Roach films, such as the Laurel and Hardy short films County Hospital, The Chimp (both 1932) and Our Relations (1936). She also had minor parts in Our Gang short films Free Eats, Choo-Choo!, The Pooch, Forgotten Babies and Free Wheeling. She later appeared in the Abbott and Costello film In The Navy and her last film was The Manchurian Candidate (1962).

== Career ==
Before Etterre became an actress, she operated a comptometer at a business in Los Angeles. After that, she became a model, primarily working in fashion shows, many of which were held at the Café Montmartre. When Etterre decided to try working in films, Pearl Eaton, who was dance director at RKO, remembered her from the Montmartre and selected her as one of 12 from several hundred women who tried out for stock contracts.

Etterre discovered that stock contracts typically limited actresses to extra roles, which led her to stop working in films when her contract ended, She became a showgirl, but she later resumed modeling, both for fashion shows and for commercial photographers. She also worked in more films.

== Personal life ==
Estelle Etterre was born on July 26, 1899, in San Francisco, California. Her father was William Howard Frederick and her mother Carrie May Case.

On June 3, 1920, she married Josef Werner Makk Jr. in Los Angeles. On February 22, 1925, Makk had died and by 1940 Etterre was earning $2,500 per year. She married again on April 3, 1943, to Donald Hyde Clough in Los Angeles; they later divorced.

== Filmography ==
=== Film ===
In all her films she only took minor roles, many of which she was not credited for

- On the Loose (1931)
- Free Eats (1932)
- The Nickel Nurser (1932)
- Choo-Choo!* (1932)
- The Chimp (1932)
- The Pooch (1932)
- County Hospital* (1932)
- Free Wheeling (1932)
- Forgotten Babies* (1933)
- King Kong (1933) (woman in front row of theater) (uncredited)
- The Romantic Age (1934)
- If You Could Only Cook (1935)
- The Preview Murder Mystery (1936)
- The Moon's Our Home (1936)
- Our Relations (1936)
- Wedding Present (1936)
- I Promise to Pay (1937)
- King of Gamblers (1937)
- Mountain Music (1937)
- The Big Broadcast of 1938 (1938)
- Dangerous to Know (1938)
- Test Pilot (1938)
- Woman Against Woman (1938)
- Sweethearts (1938)
- North of Shanghai (1939)
- Sergeant Madden (1939)
- Serenade (1939)
- The Women (1939)
- Women in War (1940)
- The Monster and the Girl (1941)
- In The Navy (1941)
- Blossoms in the Dust (1941)
- Life Begins for Andy Hardy (1941)
- Unholy Partners (1941)
- Dr. Gillespie's New Assistant (1942)
- Three Hearts for Julia (1943)
- Under the Clock (1945)
- Gangs of the Waterfront (1945)
- Sunset in El Dorado (1945)
- Week-End at the Waldorf (1945)
- An Angel Comes to Brooklyn (1945)
- Gay Blades (1946)
- The Trespasser (1947)
- The Bride Goes Wild (1948)
- Polly Fulton (1948)
- The Hunted (1945)
- Force of Evil (1948)
- Duke of Chicago (1949)
- The Yellow Cab Man (1950)
- Shadow on the Wall (1950)
- Father of the Bride (1950)
- The Jackpot (1950)
- Follow the Sun (1951)
- The Tall Target (1951)
- Here Comes the Groom (1951)
- The Unknown Man (1951)
- When Worlds Collide (1951)
- Skirts Ahoy! (1952)
- Pat and Mike (1952)
- Sudden Fear (1952)
- Confidentially Connie (1953)
- The Band Wagon (1953)
- Torch Song (1953)
- About Mrs. Leslie (1954)
- Interrupted Melody (1955)
- The Birds and the Bees (1956)
- The Leather Saint (1956)
- The Opposite Sex (1956)
- Ask Any Girl (1959)
- Please Don't Eat the Daisies (1960)
- The Subterraneans (1960)
- All Fall Down (1962)
- The Manchurian Candidate (1962)

[*] Credited as Belle Hare

=== Television ===
- The George Burns and Gracie Allen Show (1954)
- It's a Great Life (1955)
- Leave It to Beaver (1961)
- The Lucy Show (1964)
