= Harold Wertz =

American actor

- Born: August 3, 1927; Denison, Texas, US
- Died: November 21, 1999 (aged 72); San Diego, California, US
- Occupation: Child actor
- Years active: 1932

Harold Wertz (August 3, 1927 – November 21, 1999) was an American child actor.

== Early years ==
Wertz was born in Denison, Texas, and raised in Long Beach, California. He attended Woodrow Wilson High School in Long Beach.

== Our Gang ==
Back in 1929, after seeing a notice in the local newspaper, his mother entered him in a contest to replace the Hal Roach produced Our Gang comedies fat boy character Joe Cobb who had outgrown the role. Norman Chaney though won the role over 500 other entries, including Harold. Norman was known as Chubby. He was even older than Joe Cobb and in 1931 he aged out of the series so after a few months, Harold Wertz was hired to be the fat kid and would begin working at the end of 1931. He played the character Bouncy in three Our Gang films in 1932. He was in the Our Gang films Choo-Choo!, The Pooch and Hook and Ladder. Choo-Choo! was produced on May 7, 1932, The Pooch was produced on June 11, 1932, and Hook and Ladder was produced on August 27, 1932. The March 1933 Long Beach earthquake left the Culver City studios damaged and production was halted for a time. The studio exercised the 'act of God' clause and did not renew his contract though they put him on loan to other studios much of 1932 and 1933.

== Later life ==
Wertz joined the U.S. Merchant Marine and served on the ship Mills Victory during the final year of World War II and was one of the first U.S. vessels into Tokyo after the armistice in 1945. Upon his return, he married Kathleen McCracken, settled in Long Beach, California, had two children and worked in the steel pipe business until his retirement. Wertz also obtained a private pilot's license in 1980.

== Death ==
Wertz died from complications of a stroke on November 21, 1999, in San Diego, California, and is interred at Forest Lawn in Cypress, California.
