= Oliver Twist (1933 film) =

1933 American film directed by William J. Cowen

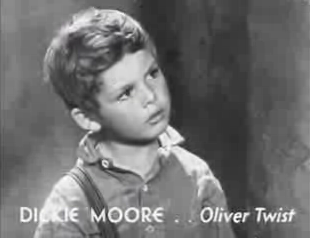
- Dickie Moore as Oliver Twist
- Directed by: William J. Cowen
- Screenplay by: Elizabeth Meehan
- Based on: Oliver Twist; 1837 novel by Charles Dickens
- Produced by: I.E. Chadwick
- Starring: Dickie Moore; Irving Pichel; Doris Lloyd; William "Stage" Boyd
- Cinematography: J. Roy Hunt
- Edited by: Carl Pierson
- Production company: Chadwick Pictures
- Distributed by: Monogram Pictures
- Release date: February 28, 1933
- Running time: 73 minutes
- Country: United States
- Language: English

The full film

Oliver Twist is a 1933 American pre-Code drama film directed by William J. Cowen. The earliest sound adaptation of Charles Dickens's 1838 novel of the same title, it stars Dickie Moore as Oliver, Irving Pichel as Fagin, Doris Lloyd as Nancy, and William "Stage" Boyd as Bill Sikes.

Released by Monogram Pictures, the film was made on an extremely low budget. The film never really achieved much success and was out of circulation for many years, but resurfaced on television in the 1980s.

== Plot ==
A young woman gives birth to a boy in a workhouse in 1830s London, then dies. The boy is taken in by the owners of the workhouse and named Oliver Twist. The orphans at the workhouse are abused and fed only gruel and bread, and Oliver asks for another bowl, getting him a severe punishment. Oliver then escapes from the workhouse, making a journey to London. He meets a young man known as The Artful Dodger, who takes him into the criminal Fagin and his gang of pickpockets. Oliver witnesses The Artful Dodger steal a handkerchief from a man named Mr. Brownlow, getting Oliver nearly arrested for the crime. But Mr. Brownlow takes pity on him and takes him into his own care. But Fagin and his accomplice, the brutish Bill Sikes want him back, and kidnap Oliver back into their clutches. They force Oliver to rob a house at night, where Oliver is shot and wounded, knocking on the door of the house he attempted to rob to seek help. But the house belongs to Mr. Brownlow, who nurses him to health once more. The gang’s crimes are exposed by Nancy Sikes, a kind member of the gang found out, causing Bill Sikes to murder her in anger. As he runs from the police, he accidentally suffocates himself with a rope while escaping through the chimney. Fagin is sent to execution for his crimes, Oliver visiting him in his last hours. Oliver ends up living a happy, peaceful life in the care of Mr. Brownlow.

== Cast ==
- Dickie Moore as Oliver Twist
- Irving Pichel as Fagin
- William "Stage" Boyd as Bill Sikes
- Doris Lloyd as Nancy Sikes
- Alec B. Francis as Mr. Brownlow
- Barbara Kent as Rose Maylie
- Sonny Ray as The Artful Dodger
- George K. Arthur as Toby Crackit
- George Nash as Charles Bates
- Clyde Cook as Chitfing
- Lionel Belmore as Mr. Bumble
- Tempe Pigott as Mrs. Corney
- Nelson McDowell as Sowerberry
- Virginia Sale as Mrs. Sowerberry
- Harry Holman as Grimwig
- Bobby Nelson as Noah Claypole

== Release ==
Early releases of the film include scenes with Oliver at Sowerberry's; these were removed for unknown reasons and makes the lasting cut look like Oliver escaped from the workhouse.
