= Night Ride (1930 film) =

1930 film

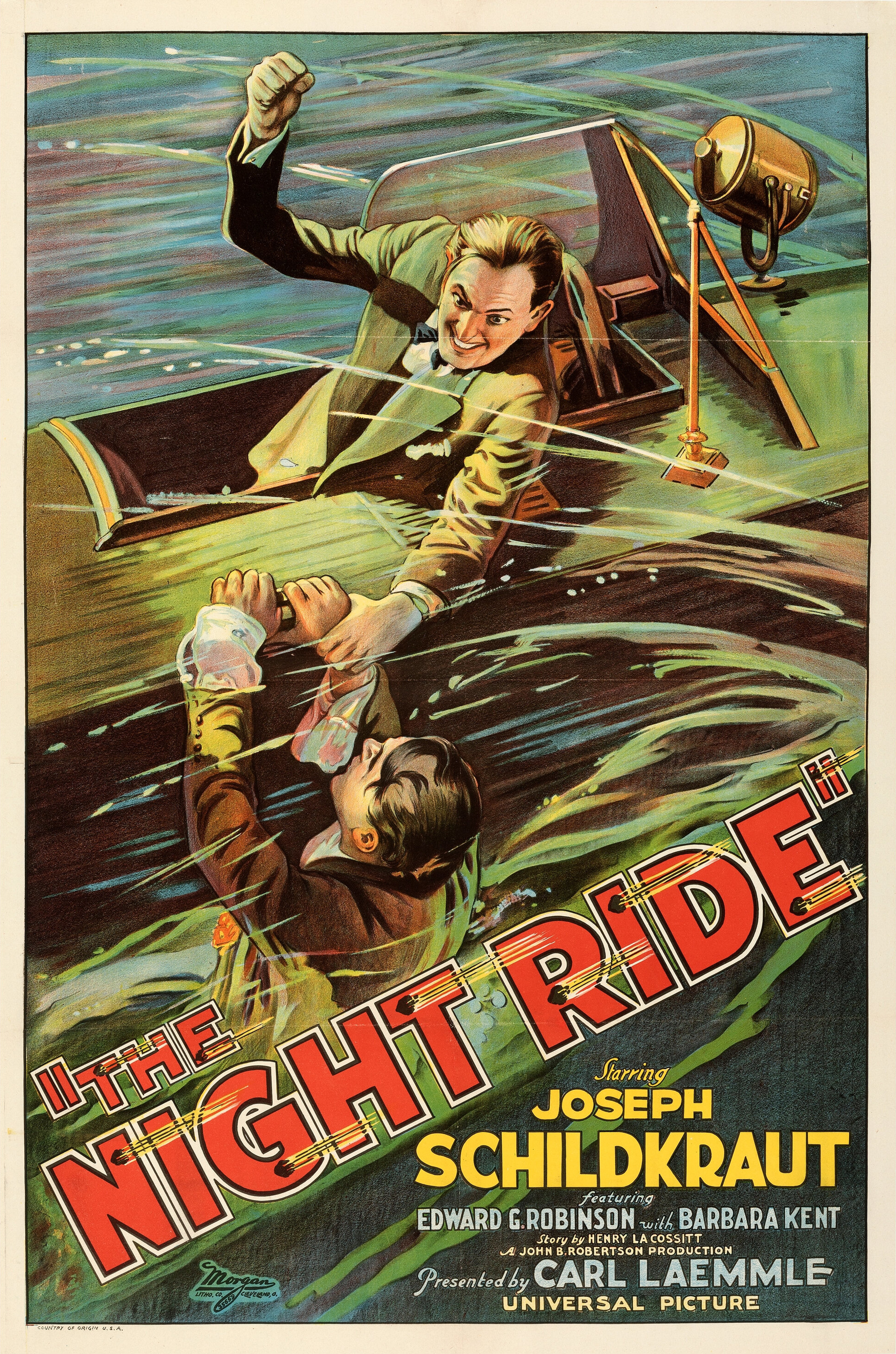
- Theatrical release poster
- Directed by: John S. Robertson
- Screenplay by: Charles Logue; Edward T. Lowe, Jr. Tom Reed
- Story by: Henry La Cossit
- Produced by: Carl Laemmle
- Starring: Joseph Schildkraut; Barbara Kent; Edward G. Robinson; Harry Stubbs; DeWitt Jennings; Ralph Welles
- Cinematography: Alvin Wyckoff
- Edited by: Milton Carruth; A. Ross
- Music by: Sam Perry
- Production company: Universal Pictures
- Distributed by: Universal Pictures
- Release date: January 12, 1930
- Running time: 60 minutes
- Country: United States
- Language: English

Night Ride is a 1930 American pre-Code crime film directed by John S. Robertson and written by Charles Logue, Edward T. Lowe, Jr. and Tom Reed. The film stars Joseph Schildkraut, Barbara Kent, Edward G. Robinson, Harry Stubbs, DeWitt Jennings and Ralph Welles. The film was released on January 12, 1930, by Universal Pictures.

== Plot ==
Just after newsman Joe Rooker married Ruth Kearns, Rooker covers a double murder during a bank robbery. Cigarettes at the scene implicate gangster Tony Garotta. Garotta kidnaps Rooker and another reporter, intending to kill them.

== Cast ==
- Joseph Schildkraut as Joe Rooker
- Barbara Kent as Ruth Kearns
- Edward G. Robinson as Tony Garotta
- Harry Stubbs as Bob O'Leary
- DeWitt Jennings as Capt. O'Donnell
- Ralph Welles as Blondie
- Hal Price as Mac
- George Ovey as Ed

== Preservation status ==
A trailer is held by the Library of Congress.
