= Dickie Moore (actor) =

American actor (1925–2015)

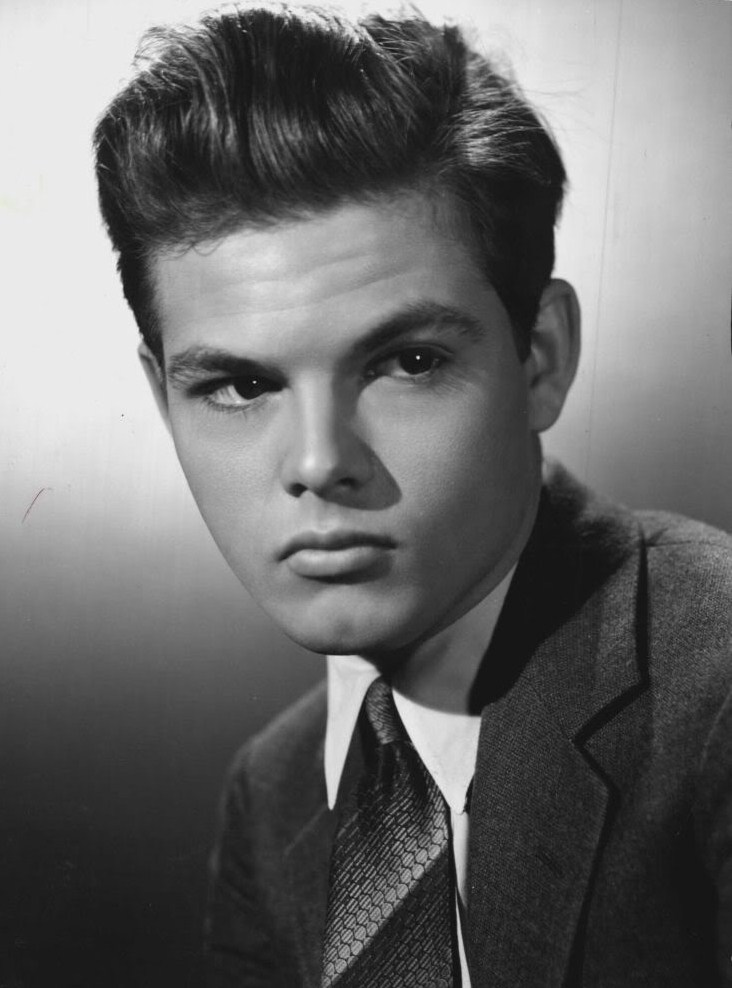
- Moore in 1944
- Born: September 12, 1925; Los Angeles, California, U.S
- Died: September 7, 2015 (aged 89); Wilton, Connecticut, U.S.
- Occupations: Actor; producer; writer; businessman
- Years active: 1927–1957
- Spouses: Pat Dempsey (m. 1948; div. 1954) Eleanor Donhowe Fitzpatrick (m. 1959; div. 1978) Jane Powell (m. 1988)
- Children: 3

John Richard Moore Jr. (September 12, 1925 – September 7, 2015) was an American actor who was one of the last survivors of the silent film era. A busy and popular actor during his childhood and youth, he appeared in over 100 films until the early 1950s. Among his most notable appearances were the Our Gang series and films such as Oliver Twist, Blonde Venus, The Story of Louis Pasteur, The Life of Emile Zola, Sergeant York, Out of the Past, and Eight Iron Men.

== Career ==
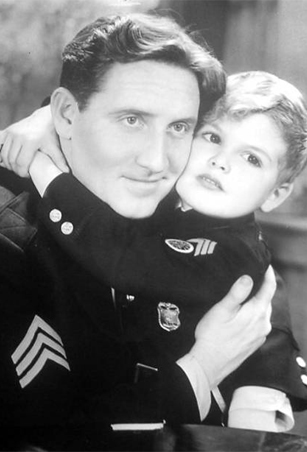
Moore with Spencer Tracy in Disorderly Conduct (1932)

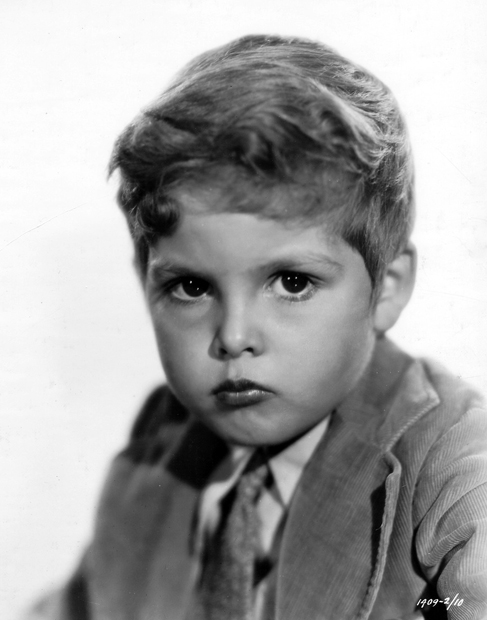
Dickie Moore in 1932

John Richard Moore Jr. was born in Los Angeles, California, the son of Nora Eileen (née Orr) and John Richard Moore, a banker. His mother was Irish, and his paternal grandparents were from England and Ireland, respectively.

He made his film debut in 1927 in the silent film The Beloved Rogue, where he portrayed silent film star John Barrymore's character as a one-year-old baby. He soon gained notable supporting roles. He appeared as Marlene Dietrich's son in Josef von Sternberg's drama Blonde Venus (1932). He also appeared with Barbara Stanwyck in So Big (1932), with Walter Huston in Gabriel Over the White House (1933) and with Spencer Tracy in Man's Castle (1933).

In the 1932–33 season Moore appeared in eight films of the Our Gang series, as the leader of the gang. He left the series after one year to play in more feature films. He is perhaps most remembered for his portrayal of the title character in the 1933 adaptation of Oliver Twist.

In 1935, he played Joseph Meister in The Story of Louis Pasteur. In 1941, he portrayed the brother of Gary Cooper in the war drama Sergeant York under the direction of Howard Hawks. He is also famous for giving Shirley Temple her first romantic onscreen kiss, in the film Miss Annie Rooney.

Moore served in the United States Army during World War II. Later, he was less successful as a teenage actor and young adult and he often had to play in B-movies such as Dangerous Years. One of his last notable film roles was in Out of the Past (1947), in which he portrayed Robert Mitchum's deaf young assistant, "The Kid". His last role was a young soldier in Eight Iron Men (1952).

He later performed on Broadway, in stock and on television. He went on to teach and write books about acting, publish Equity News for Actors' Equity Association, and produce industrial films and a short film The Boy and the Eagle, which was nominated for an Oscar. He retired from acting in the late 1950s.

== Personal life ==
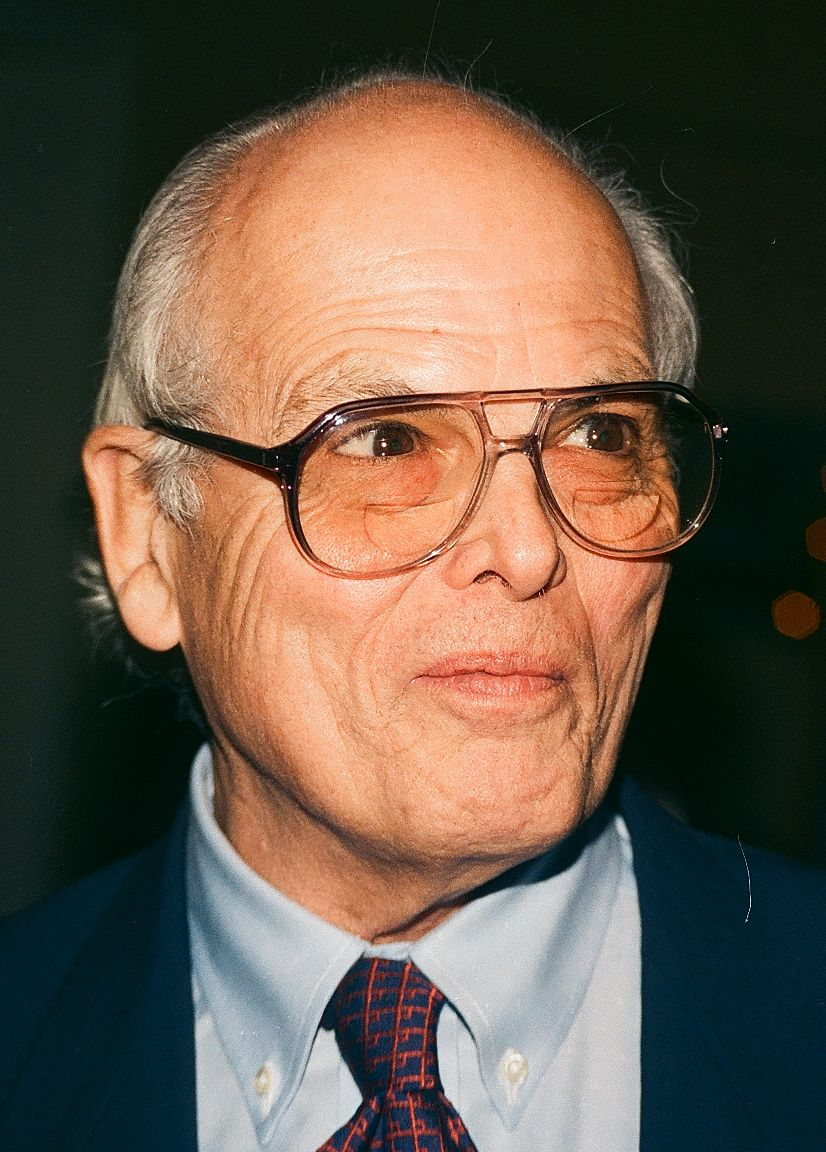
Moore in 1998

Moore was married three times. His first marriage was to Pat Dempsey from 1948 to 1954. The couple had one child, Kevin Moore. In 1959 he married Eleanor Donhowe Fitzpatrick; they divorced in 1978. His third and final marriage was in 1988 to Jane Powell, to whom he remained married until his death in 2015. The two met when Moore interviewed Powell for Twinkle, Twinkle, Little Star, which he had just published. The couple lived in Manhattan and Wilton, Connecticut.

== Later life ==
In 1984, Moore published Twinkle, Twinkle, Little Star (But Don't Have Sex or Take the Car), a book about his and others' experiences as child actors. In 1966, after battling addiction to alcohol and drugs, he founded a public relations firm, Dick Moore and Associates, which he ran until 2010.

In March 2013, Moore's wife reported that he had arthritis and "bouts of dementia". He died at a hospice in Wilton, Connecticut, on September 7, 2015, five days before his 90th birthday. He was cremated.

== Filmography ==
- The Beloved Rogue (1927) as Baby Francois (film debut, uncredited)
- Object: Alimony (1928) as Jimmy Rutledge Jr. (as Dickey Moore)
- Madame X (1929) as Boy at Puppet Show (uncredited)
- Son of the Gods (1930) as Sam Lee – as a Boy (uncredited)
- The Three Sisters (1930) as The Child (uncredited)
- Let Us Be Gay (1930) as Young Bobby Brown (uncredited)
- The Matrimonial Bed (1930) as One of Susan's Sons (uncredited)
- Lawful Larceny (1930) as The Dorsey Child (uncredited)
- The Office Wife (1930) as Dickie – Boy at the Beach (uncredited)
- Passion Flower (1930) as Tommy Wallace
- Aloha (1931) as Junior Bradford
- Seed (1931) as Johnny Carter as a Child
- Three Who Loved (1931) as Sonny Hanson
- Confessions of a Co-Ed (1931) as Patricia's Son (uncredited)
- The Star Witness (1931) as Ned Leeds
- The Squaw Man (1931) as Little Hal
- Sob Sister (1931) as Kidnapped Boy (uncredited)
- Husband's Holiday (1931) as Philip Boyd
- Manhattan Parade (1931) as Junior Roberts
- No Greater Love (1932) as Tommy Burns
- Union Depot (1932) as Little Boy (uncredited)
- Fireman, Save My Child (1932) as Herbie (uncredited)
- The Expert (1932) as Dickie
- Disorderly Conduct (1932) as Jimmy
- So Big! (1932) as Dirk De Jong (younger)
- When a Feller Needs a Friend (1932)
- Million Dollar Legs (1932) as Willie – Angela's Brother
- Winner Takes All (1932) as Dickie Harmon
- Hook and Ladder (1932, Short) as Dickie (as Hal Roach's Rascals)
- Blonde Venus (1932) as Johnny Faraday
- Free Wheeling (1932, Short) as Dickie
- Deception (1932) as Dickie Allen
- Birthday Blues (1932, Short) as Dickie (as Our Gang)
- The Devil Is Driving (1932) as 'Buddy' Evans
- The Racing Strain (1932) as Bill Westcott as a Little Boy
- A Lad an' a Lamp (1932, Short) as Dickie (as Our Gang)
- Fish Hooky (1933, Short) as Dickie (as Our Gang)
- Oliver Twist (1933) as Oliver Twist
- Obey the Law (1933) as Dickie Chester
- Forgotten Babies (1933, Short) as Dickie (as Our Gang)
- Gabriel Over the White House (1933) as Jimmy Vetter
- The Kid from Borneo (1933, Short) as Dickie (as Our Gang)
- Mush and Milk (1933, Short) as Dickie (as Our Gang)
- The Wolf Dog (1933, Serial) as Boy at Airport
- Cradle Song (1933) as Alberto
- Man's Castle (1933) as Joey
- Gallant Lady (1933) as Deedy Lawrence
- This Side of Heaven (1934) as Freddie
- Upper World (1934) as Tommy Stream
- In Love with Life (1934) as Laurence 'Laury' Applegate
- Fifteen Wives (1934) as Young Boy
- The Human Side (1934) as Bobbie Sheldon
- Tomorrow's Youth (1934) as Thomas Hall Jr
- The World Accuses (1934) as Tommy Weymouth
- Little Men (1934) as Demi
- Swellhead (1935) as Billy Malone
- Without Children (1935) as David Sonny Cole Jr. as a Child
- So Red the Rose (1935) as Middleton Bedford
- Peter Ibbetson (1935) as Gogo – Peter Age 8
- Timothy's Quest (1936) as Timothy
- The Story of Louis Pasteur (1936) as Joseph Meister
- The Little Red Schoolhouse (1936) as Dickie Burke
- The Life of Emile Zola (1937) as Pierre Dreyfus
- Madame X (1937) as Allan Simonds (uncredited)
- The Bride Wore Red (1937) as Pietro
- Love, Honor and Behave (1938) as Ted – as a child
- My Bill (1938) as Bill Colbrook
- The Gladiator (1938) as Bobby
- The Arkansas Traveler (1938) as Benjamin Franklin 'Benny' Allen
- Lincoln in the White House (1939, Short) as Tad Lincoln
- The Under-Pup (1939) as Jerry Binns
- Hidden Power (1939) as Stevie Garfield
- The Blue Bird (1940) as Young Lad (uncredited)
- A Dispatch from Reuter's (1940) as Reuter as a Boy
- The Great Mr. Nobody (1941) as 'Limpy' Barnes
- Sergeant York (1941) as George York
- The Adventures of Martin Eden (1942) as Johnny
- Miss Annie Rooney (1942) as Marty White
- Heaven Can Wait (1943) as Henry Van Cleve – Age 15 (uncredited)
- Happy Land (1943) as Peter Orcutt
- Jive Junction (1943) as Peter Crane
- The Song of Bernadette (1943) as Adolard Bouhouhorts – Age 15 (uncredited)
- The Eve of St. Mark (1944) as Zip West
- Youth Runs Wild (1944) as Georgie Dunlop
- Sweet and Low-Down (1944) as Military Cadet General Cramichael
- Out of the Past (1947) as The Kid
- Dangerous Years (1947) as Gene Spooner
- 16 Fathoms Deep (1948) as George
- Behind Locked Doors (1948) as Jim (uncredited)
- Bad Boy (1949) as Charlie
- Tuna Clipper (1949) as Frankie Pereira
- Captain Video and His Video Rangers (1949, TV Series) as Jeff
- Killer Shark (1950) as Jonesy
- Cody of the Pony Express (1950, Serial) as Bill Cody
- Lux Video Theatre (1951–1953, TV Series) as Tony/Carter Lockwood
- The Member of the Wedding (1952) as Soldier
- Eight Iron Men (1952) as Pvt. Muller (final film)
- Omnibus (1957, TV Series) as Lt. Gen. J.E.B. Stuart (final appearance)

== Bibliography ==
- Best, Marc. Those Endearing Young Charms: Child Performers of the Screen (South Brunswick and New York: Barnes & Co., 1971), pp. 197–202.
- Dye, David. Child and Youth Actors: Filmography of Their Entire Careers, 1914–1985. Jefferson, NC: McFarland & Co., 1988, pp. 162–163.
- Holmstrom, John. The Moving Picture Boy: An International Encyclopaedia from 1895 to 1995, Norwich, Michael Russell, 1996, pp. 139–140.
