= Brats (1930 film) =

1930 short film by James Parrott

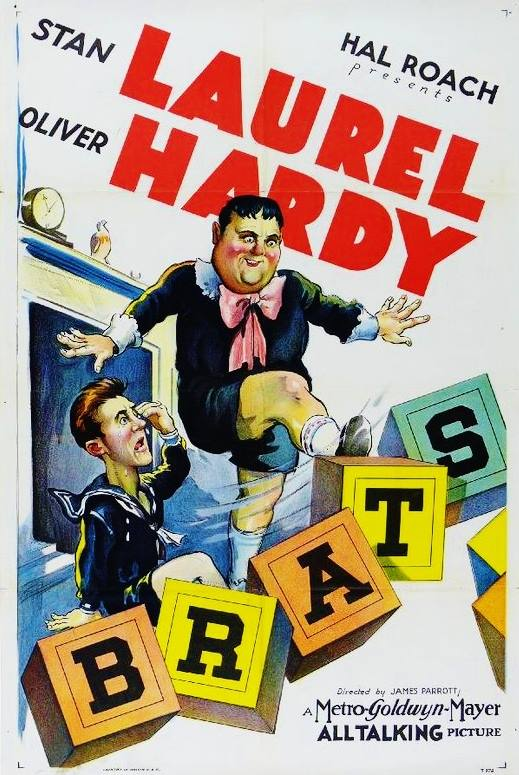
- Directed by: James Parrott
- Written by: Leo McCarey; H.M. Walker
- Produced by: Hal Roach
- Starring: Stan Laurel; Oliver Hardy
- Cinematography: George Stevens
- Edited by: Richard C. Currier
- Music by: Leroy Shield (1937 reissue)
- Distributed by: Metro-Goldwyn-Mayer
- Release date: March 22, 1930
- Running time: 20:51
- Country: United States
- Language: English

Brats is a 1930 Laurel and Hardy comedy short. The film was directed by James Parrott. Laurel and Hardy play dual roles as their own children. It also inspired a helper group for the Michigan tent for The Sons of the Desert, which is composed of all the child members of the tent. This is the first of only three films where the boys each play a dual role: the second is Twice Two and the third and last is Our Relations.

== Plot ==
The short.

Stan Laurel and Ollie Hardy are spending a night in with their two kids Stanley and Oliver Junior. The fathers are playing checkers and pool, but are constantly distracted by their own incompetence and by their children, who are constantly bullying each other and trying to stay up late. The film begins with Stan and Ollie playing a game of checkers, and Little Stan and Little Ollie. playing with blocks. They smash a vase and are sent to bed. Little Ollie is pushed into a full bath and chases Little Stan out (leaving the taps and the shower on), but slips on the soap causing part of the ceiling to crash onto the pool table. Big Stan and Big Ollie are furious and rush upstairs, only to find their little versions in bed pretending to be asleep. When both boys ask for a drink of water, Oliver opens the door to the by-now flooded bathroom, and the water gushes out from the bathroom in a torrent, bowling them over in a drenched heap as the film ends.

== Cast ==
- Stan Laurel as Stan and Stanley Jr.
- Oliver Hardy as Ollie and Oliver Jr.

== Production ==
Brats was one of four Laurel and Hardy sound shorts reissued in 1937. At that time, new background music scores by Leroy Shield, which were used in many 1937 Hal Roach films, were added. The films reissued that way were Blotto, County Hospital and Perfect Day. Additionally, Brats' introductory title ("Mr. Laurel and Mr. Hardy remained at home to take care of the children---"/"Their wives had gone out for target practice--") was eliminated from the reissue prints.

This is one of just two shorts to feature only Stan and Ollie in the cast; the other is the 1928 silent Early to Bed. It is also the only film in which they play natural fathers.

The illusion of Laurel and Hardy as children was achieved using oversized furniture. Each room of the house was re-created in large scale to achieve the effect of both duos being in the same house. Doors and staircases had to be duplicated to appear as though the "children" were child-size. The "children" are as tall as a doorknob and a sink and Little Stan must use a stepstool to reach the tub's taps, the tub seeming more like a small pool. Little Ollie's bulk causes him to crash through some dresser drawers.

The mouse that Little Stan nearly shoots with a pellet gun was animated.

In 2011, both the 1937 soundtrack version and the original 1930 soundtrack version were issued on "Laurel & Hardy - The Essential Collection" DVD box set. These are also included on the 2020 "Laurel and Hardy - The Definitive Restorations" DVD and Blu-Ray collections.
