= May Wallace =

American actress (1877–1938)

May Wallace Maddox
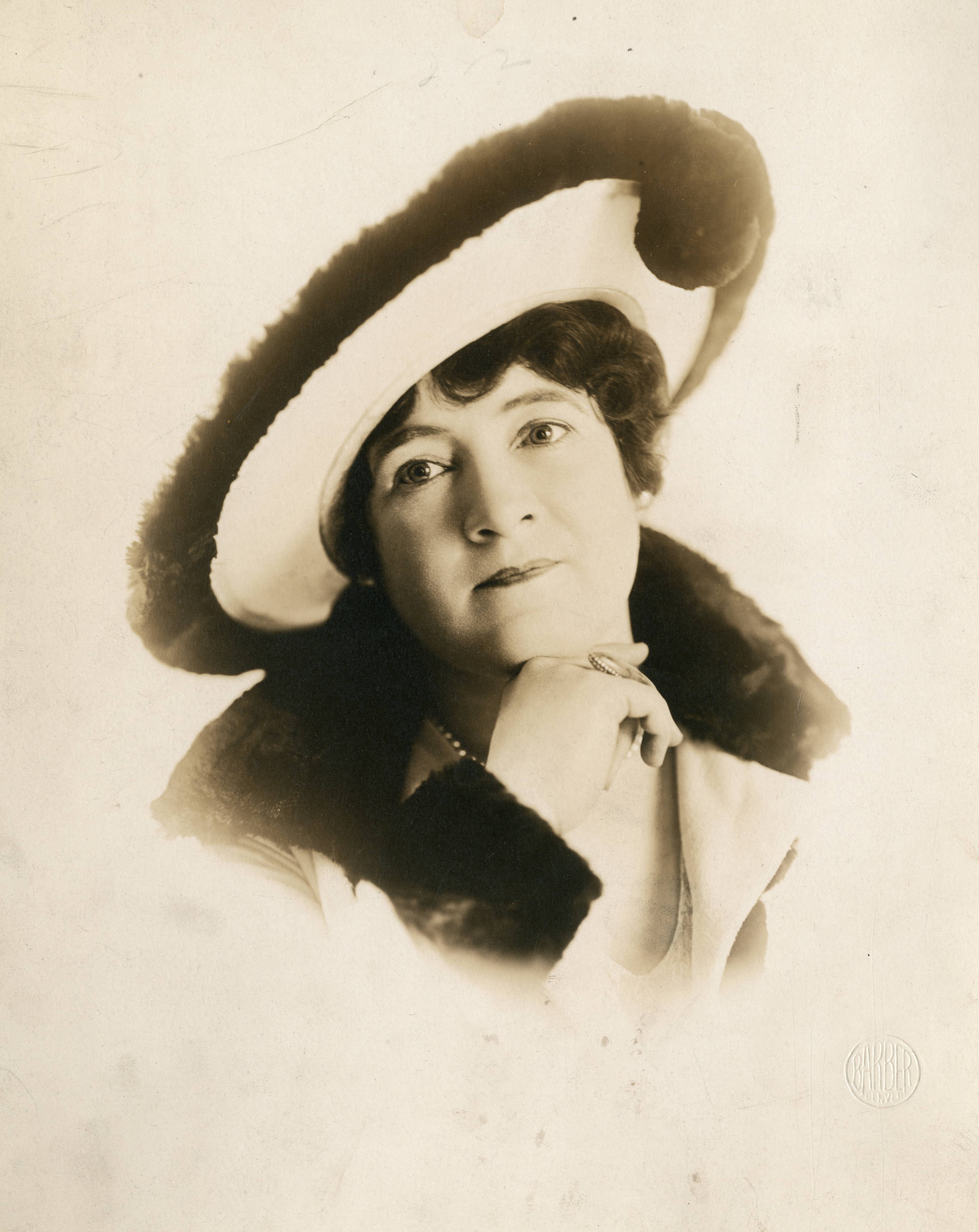
- Born: August 23, 1877; Russiaville, Indiana, U.S.
- Died: December 11, 1938 (aged 61); Los Angeles, California, U.S.
- Occupation: Actress
- Years active: 1914-1938
- Spouse: Thomas W. Maddox (?-1938) (her death)
- Children: 2

May Wallace (August 23, 1877 – December 11, 1938) was an American film actress.

== Biography ==
Wallace was born in 1877 in Russiaville, Indiana. As a film actress, she often played supporting roles for producer Hal Roach in his Laurel and Hardy and Our Gang comedies, mostly in maternal roles. She appeared in more than 60 films between 1914 and 1939.

Wallace was married to Thomas W. Maddox until her death, they had one daughter and one son. She died on December 11, 1938, in Los Angeles, California, of heart disease, aged 61.

== Selected filmography ==
Sources include American Film Institute Catalogue and Alexander Street.

- His Prehistoric Past (1914) – The Queen
- My Lady Friends (1921) – Hilda
- The Cup of Life (1921) – Mollie
- Gimme (1923) – Mrs. Cecily McGimsey
- Dollar Devils (1923) – Mrs. Andrews
- The Reckless Age (1924) – Auntie Meyrick
- Oh, You Tony! (1924) – Etiquette instructor
- Fluttering Hearts (1927)
- Now I'll Tell One (1927)
- Sailors, Beware! (1927)
- Love 'em and Weep (1927)
- Crazy House (1928)
- Painted Faces (1929) – Jurywoman
- Love Business (1931)
- County Hospital (1932)
- Readin' and Writin' (1932)
- Free Eats (1932)
- The Pooch (1932)
- The Kid from Borneo (1933)
- Twice Two (Voice) (1933)
- What's Your Racket? (1933) – Mrs. Cosgrove
- Jealousy (1934)
- Beginner's Luck (1935)
- Orchids to You (1935) – Matron
- Flying Hostess (1936)
- The Sky Parade (1936) – Mrs. Russell
- Two-fisted Gentleman (1936) – Mrs. Bainbridge
- Arbor Day (1936)
- Roamin' Holiday (1937)
- Way Out West (1937)
- When You're in Love (1937)
- Pick a Star (1937) – Joe's Landlady
- Internes Can't Take Money (1937) – Mother Superior
- Midnight Madonna (1937) – Mrs. Withers
- The Lady Objects (1938)
- Smashing the Spy Ring (1938) – Mrs. Baxter
- The Little Adventuress (1938) – Social worker
- Zenobia (1939) – Townsperson
