= Forgotten Babies =

1933 film

- Directed by: Robert F. McGowan
- Produced by: Robert F. McGowan; Hal Roach
- Cinematography: Art Lloyd
- Edited by: Jack Ogilvie
- Music by: Leroy Shield; Marvin Hatley
- Distributed by: MGM
- Release date: March 11, 1933
- Running time: 16 minutes 44 seconds
- Country: United States
- Language: English

Forgotten Babies is a 1933 Our Gang short comedy film directed by Robert F. McGowan. It was the 121st Our Gang short to be released.

== Plot ==
The children are taking care of their baby brothers and sisters on a Saturday, but would much rather go swimming. They blackmail Spanky into doing the job for them, by threatening to reveal that he broke a neighbor's window. Spanky is left at home alone to mind all the babies.

He tells them a long, fractured story about Tarzan, but one baby slips away unnoticed and climbs the stairs. As Spanky hurries to bring him down with a cushion, the others start causing havoc around the house, such as tossing fish out of their bowl, throwing food from the icebox onto the kitchen floor for Pete the dog to eat, and using a vacuum cleaner to spray flour all over the kitchen. To keep the stair-climbing baby out of trouble, Spanky pours glue on the floor and makes him sit in it.

As he tries in vain to rein in the other babies, one of them turns on a radio (broadcasting a murder mystery), dials a telephone, and leaves the receiver in range of the speaker. The operators hear the broadcast and call the police, thinking that an actual murder is taking place. The police reach the house, find the radio, and confront the children when they return from swimming. As the water from an overflowing upstairs bathtub leaks through the ceiling, the children explain that they left Spanky in charge of the babies. They find him in the kitchen, where he has put two of the babies in birdcages; glued a third to the floor; used a chair, spittoons, and flatirons to immobilize a fourth; and barricaded Pete in a breadbox.

== Cast ==
- George McFarland as Spanky
- Matthew Beard as Stymie
- Tommy Bond as Tommy
- Dorothy DeBorba as Dorothy
- Bobby Hutchins as Wheezer
- Dickie Moore as Dickie
- John Collum as Uh-huh
- Dickie Jackson as Dickie
- David Holt - Our Gang member
- Pete the Pup as himself

=== Additional cast ===
- Bobbie Beard as Cotton
- Dickie Hutchins as Baby who says "Remarkable"
- Tommy McFarland as Baby who breaks a lamp, jumps on the bed and overflows the bath tub
- Murlin Powers as Baby
- Duke Sexton as Baby
- Harry Bernard as Officer
- Estelle Etterre as Nemo's girl friend in broadcast / Telephone company operator
- Billy Gilbert as Radio station NIX announcer / Dr. Nemo, serial character
- Dick Gilbert as Officer
- Madeline McGowan as Telephone company operator

== Notes ==
Forgotten Babies is a partial remake of Cradle Robbers.

== See also ==
- Our Gang filmography
