= Barbara Kent =

Canadian-American actress (1907–2011)

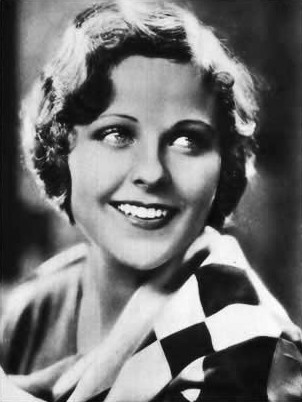
- Kent in 1924
- Born: Barbara Cloutman; December 16, 1907; Gadsby, Alberta, Canada
- Died: October 13, 2011 (aged 103); Palm Desert, California, U.S.
- Occupation: Film actress
- Years active: 1925–1941
- Spouses: Harry E. Edington (m. 1932; died 1949) Jack Monroe (m. 1954; died 1998)

Barbara Kent (née Cloutman; December 16, 1907 – October 13, 2011) was a Canadian film actress, prominent from the silent film era to the early talkies of the 1920s and 1930s. In 1925, Barbara Kent won the Miss Hollywood Beauty Pageant.

== Career ==
Barbara Cloutman was born on December 16, 1907, in Gadsby, Alberta, Canada, to Lily Louise Kent and Jullion Curtis Cloutman. Sources differ on surname as Klowtmann or Cloutman and birth year as 1907 or 1906. In 1925, she graduated from Hollywood High School and went on to win the Miss Hollywood Pageant. It was also the year in which she began her Hollywood career with a small role for Universal Studios, which signed her to a contract. A petite brunette who stood less than five feet tall, Kent became popular as a comedian opposite such stars as Reginald Denny. She made a strong impression as the heroine pitted against Greta Garbo's femme fatale in Flesh and the Devil in 1926 after Universal had lent the actress to MGM to make the film.

Kent then attracted the attention of audiences and censors in the 1927 production No Man's Law by appearing to swim nude. She actually wore a flesh-colored moleskin bathing suit in scenes that were considered very daring at the time. The popularity of that film led to her selection as one of the WAMPAS Baby Stars for 1927. She made a smooth transition into talking pictures opposite Harold Lloyd in the 1929 comedy Welcome Danger. Kent was also featured with Lloyd in his iconic Feet First. Over the next few years, she remained popular and received critical praise in 1933 for her role in the film version of Oliver Twist.

In 1932 she starred in "The Perfect Alibi," based on a play by A. A. Milne, at the Harold Lloyd co-founded Beverly Hills Little Theatre for Professionals. Kent married talent agent Harry Edington in Yuma, Arizona later that same year, on December 16, 1932 — her 25th birthday.

== Personal life ==
Kent had a great love for the outdoors. Always active, she enjoyed golf, fly fishing, hunting, and gardening. She was a longtime member of Marakkesh, Sunland, and Thunderbird Country Clubs. She was known as a talented cook and loved entertaining friends and family.

Following the death of her husband Harry in 1949, Kent retreated from public life.

She married again in 1954, to Jack Monroe, a Lockheed aircraft engineer. Her second husband gave her flying lessons, and Kent continued to fly light aircraft until her 85th birthday, and was still playing golf well into her mid-90s. The couple resided initially in Sun Valley, Idaho, but later relocated to Palm Desert, California. There Kent lived until her death, at the age of 103, on October 13, 2011.

== Filmography ==
Film
Year	Title	Role	Notes
1926	Flesh and the Devil	Hertha	
1926	Prowlers of the Night	Anita Parsons	Lost film
1927	The Peace Deputy		Short film
1927	The Lone Eagle	Mimi	Lost film
1927	No Man's Law	Toby Belcher	
1927	The Small Bachelor	Molly Waddington	
1927	The Drop Kick	Cecily Graves	
1927	Stop That Man!	Muriel Crawford	Lost film
1928	Modern Mothers	Mildred	Lost film
1928	That's My Daddy	Molly Moran	
1928	His Destiny	Betty Baker	
1928	Lonesome	Mary	Free access icon
1928	Fun in the Clouds	Self	Short film, cameo, uncredited
1929	Welcome Danger	Billie Lee	
1929	The Shakedown	Marjorie	
1930	Night Ride	Ruth Kearns	Lost film
1930	Dumbbells in Ermine	Faith Corey	Lost film
1930	Feet First	Barbara	
1930	What Men Want	Betty 'Babs' Joyce	
1931	Freighters of Destiny	Ruth Mercer	
1931	Chinatown After Dark	Lotus	
1931	Grief Street	Jean Royce	Free access icon
1931	Indiscreet	Joan Trent	Free access icon
1932	Self Defense	Nona Devoux	
1932	Emma	Gypsy	
1932	The Pride of the Legion	Martha Tully	Free access icon
1932	No Living Witness	Carol Everett	
1932	Beauty Parlor	Sally Dale	
1932	Vanity Fair	Amelia Sedley	
1932	Exposed	Ruth	
1933	Marriage on Approval	Beth MacDougall	
1933	Her Forgotten Past	Doris Maynard	
1933	Oliver Twist	Rose Maylie	
1935	Swellhead	Mary Malone	
1935	Guard That Girl	Jeanne Martin	
1935	Old Man Rhythm	Edith Warren	
1941	Under Age	Jackie	
1970	4 Clowns	Toby Belcher from No Man's Law	Archive Footage, uncredited

Television
Year	Title	Role	Notes
2011	TCM Remembers	Self	Archive Footage, posthumously release
