= Wedding Present (film) =

1936 film by Richard Wallace

- Directed by: Richard Wallace
- Written by: Joseph Anthony
- Story by: Paul Gallico
- Produced by: B.P. Schulberg
- Starring: Joan Bennett; Cary Grant; George Bancroft
- Cinematography: Leon Shamroy
- Edited by: Robert Bischoff
- Music by: Gerard Carbonara; John Leipold; Marlin Skiles
- Production company: Paramount Pictures
- Distributed by: Paramount Pictures
- Release date: October 9, 1936
- Running time: 81 minutes
- Country: United States
- Language: English

Wedding Present is a 1936 American romantic screwball comedy film directed by Richard Wallace and starring Joan Bennett, Cary Grant and George Bancroft. The screenplay was written by Joseph Anthony, based on a story by Paul Gallico. The film was distributed by Paramount Pictures. Producer B. P. Schulberg was the firm's former studio head. The film reteamed Bennett and Grant, despite the fact their previous pairing Big Brown Eyes had not been a commercial or critical success.

== Plot ==
Charlie Mason and 'Rusty' Fleming are reporters for a Chicago tabloid who are romantically involved. Charlie's mischievous shenanigans cause Rusty to move to New York. Charlie resigns his job and, along with gangster friend 'Smiles' Benson, he pursues Rusty to win her back before she marries a stuffy society author.

== Cast ==
- Joan Bennett as Monica 'Rusty' Fleming
- Cary Grant as Charlie
- George Bancroft as Stagg
- Conrad Nagel as Dodacker
- Gene Lockhart as Archduke Gustav Ernest
- William Demarest as 'Smiles' Benson
- Inez Courtney as Mary Lawson
- Edward Brophy as Squinty
- Purnell Pratt as Howard Van Dorn
- Douglas Wood as Willett
- George Meeker as Gordon Blaker
- Damon Ford as Mike Haley
- Lois Wilson as Laura Dodacker
- Mary Forbes as Mrs. Dodacker
- George Offerman Jr. as Sammy Smith
- John Henry Allen as Jonathan
- Torben Meyer as Winternitz
- Charles Middleton as Turnbull
- Heinie Conklin as Herman
- Bradley Page as Givens
- Clarence Wilson as Simmons
- Estelle Etterre as Switchboard Operator
- Dagmar Oakland as Reporter
- Jack Mulhall as Reporter

== Bibliography ==
- Eyman, Scott (2021). Cary Grant: A Brilliant Disguise. Simon & Schuster. ISBN 978-1501191398.
- Glancy, Mark (2020). Cary Grant, the Making of a Hollywood Legend. Oxford University Press. ISBN 978-0190053130.
