= Feet First =

1930 film

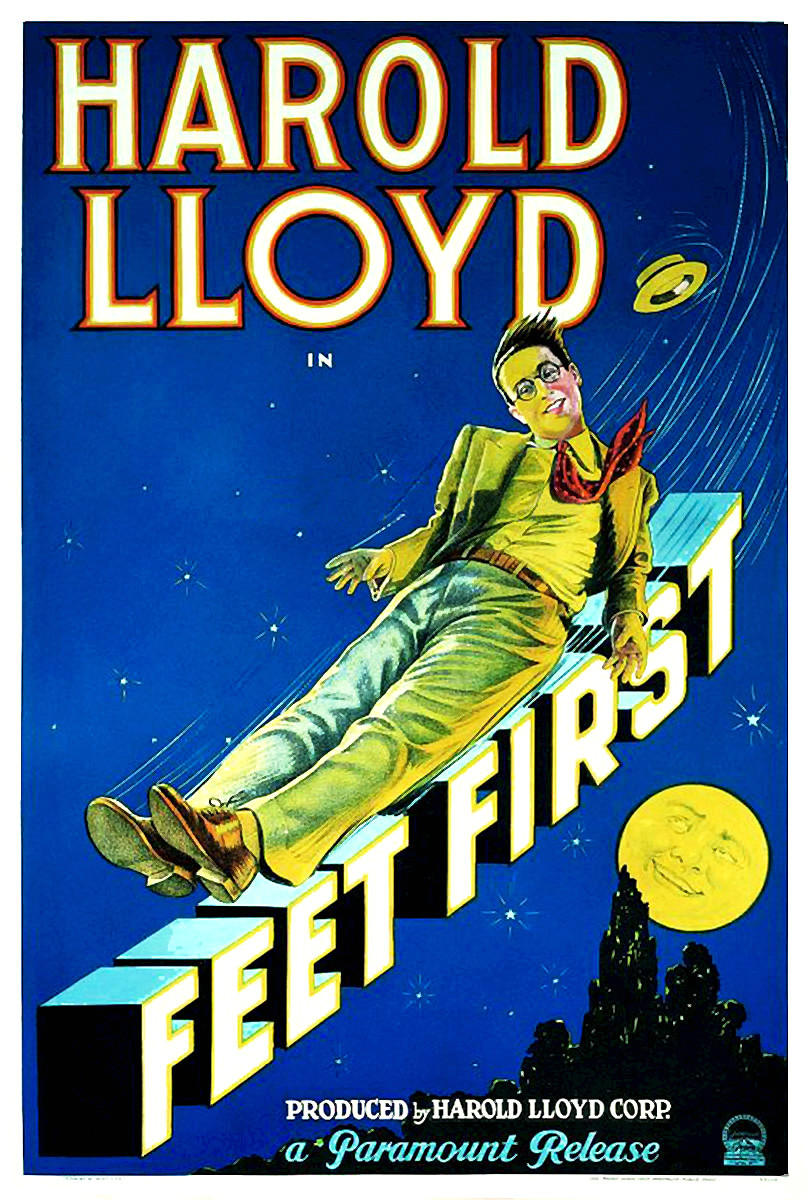
- Original US release poster. (Note the similarity to Paramount's Bebe Daniels film of 1925, Wild, Wild Susan. Daniels had been Lloyd's great female costar in his years making short films.)
- Directed by: Clyde Bruckman
- Produced by: Harold Lloyd
- Starring: Harold Lloyd; Barbara Kent; Robert McWade
- Cinematography: Henry N. Kohler; Walter Lundin
- Edited by: Bernard W. Burton
- Music by: Mischa Bakaleinikoff (uncredited); Claude Lapham (uncredited); Walter Scharf (1962 re-release)
- Distributed by: Paramount Pictures
- Release date: November 8, 1930 (U.S.)
- Running time: 93 minutes
- Country: United States
- Language: English
- Budget: $647,353

Feet First is a 1930 American pre-Code comedy film starring Harold Lloyd, a popular daredevil comedian during the 1920s and early 1930s. It was Lloyd's second sound film. The film's copyright was renewed in 1957 and it entered the public domain on January 1, 2026.

== Plot ==
Feet First (1930)

Harold Horne, an ambitious shoe salesman in Honolulu, meets his boss's secretary Barbara, thinking that she is the boss's daughter, and tells her that he is a millionaire leather tycoon.

Horne spends much of his time around Barbara hiding his true circumstances, in both the shoe store and later as an accidental stowaway aboard a ship. Trying to evade the ship's crew, he becomes trapped in a mailbag, which is taken off the ship and falls off a delivery cart onto a window cleaner's cradle, which is hoisted upwards. Escaping from the bag, he is then dangling high above the streets of Los Angeles. After several thwarted attempts to enter the building, he climbs to the top, only to slip off, unaware that his foot is caught on the end of a rope, which rescues him inches from the ground.

== Cast ==
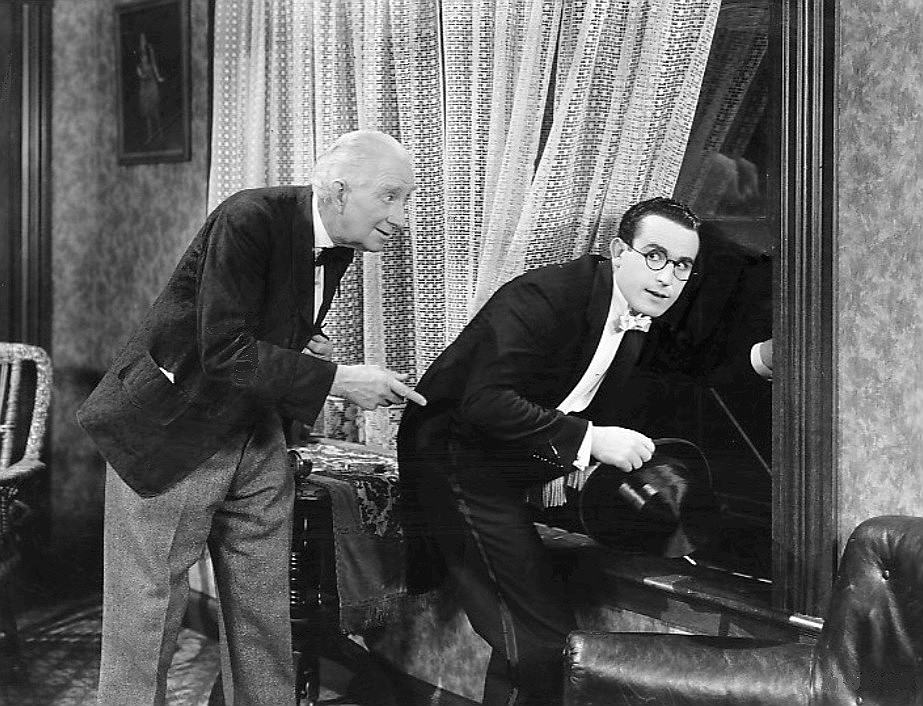
Alec B. Francis and Harold Lloyd in Feet First

- Harold Lloyd as Harold Horne
- Barbara Kent as Barbara
- Robert McWade as John Quincy Tanner
- Lillian Leighton as Mrs. Tanner
- Alec Francis as Mr. Carson
- Henry Hall as Endicott
- Noah Young as a Sailor
- Willie Best as a Janitor
- Arthur Housman as a Drunken Clubman
- Nick Copeland as a Man Arguing With Friend
- James Finlayson as a Painter
- Buster Phelps as a Little Boy
- Leo Willis as a Truck Driver

== Production ==
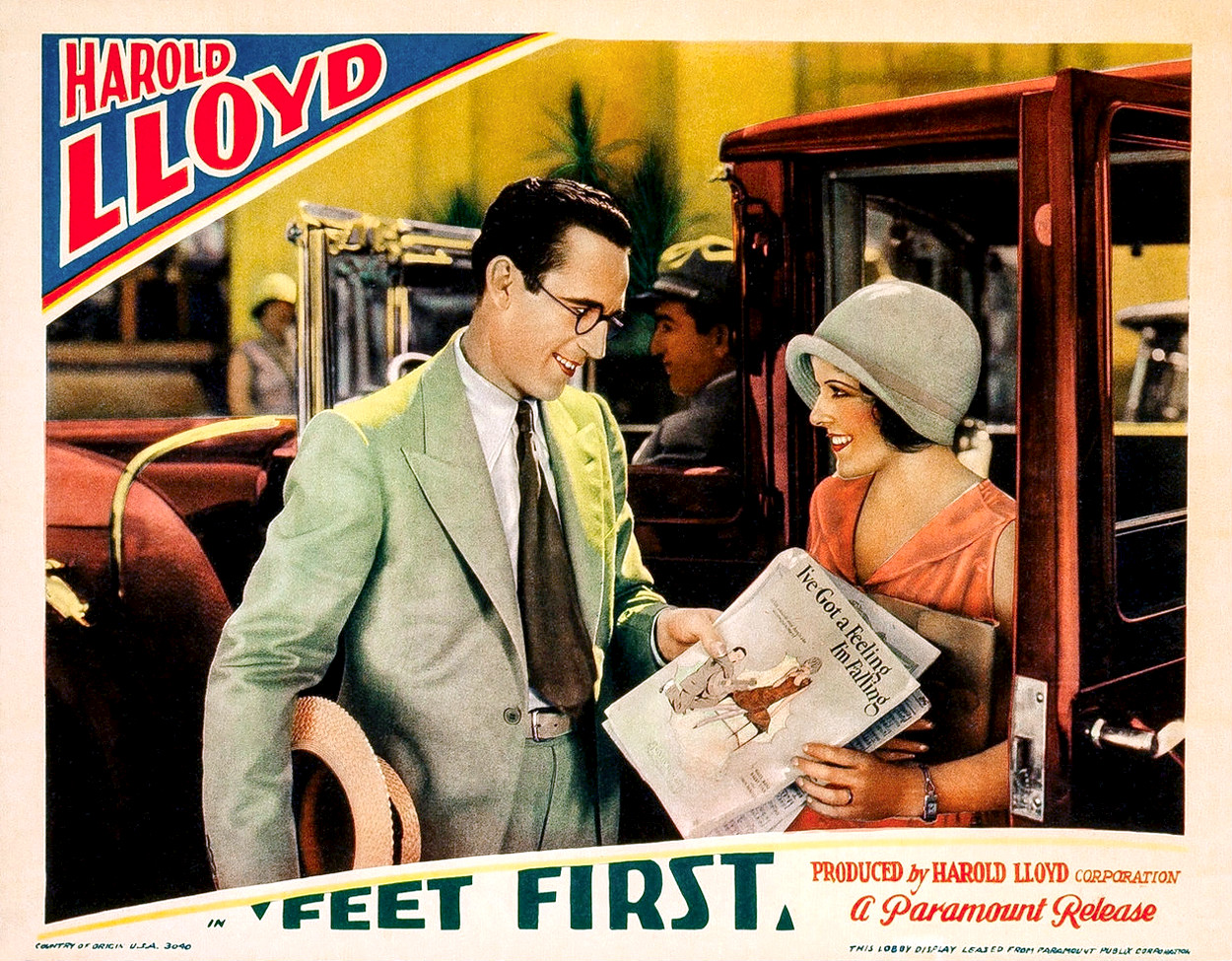
Lobby card

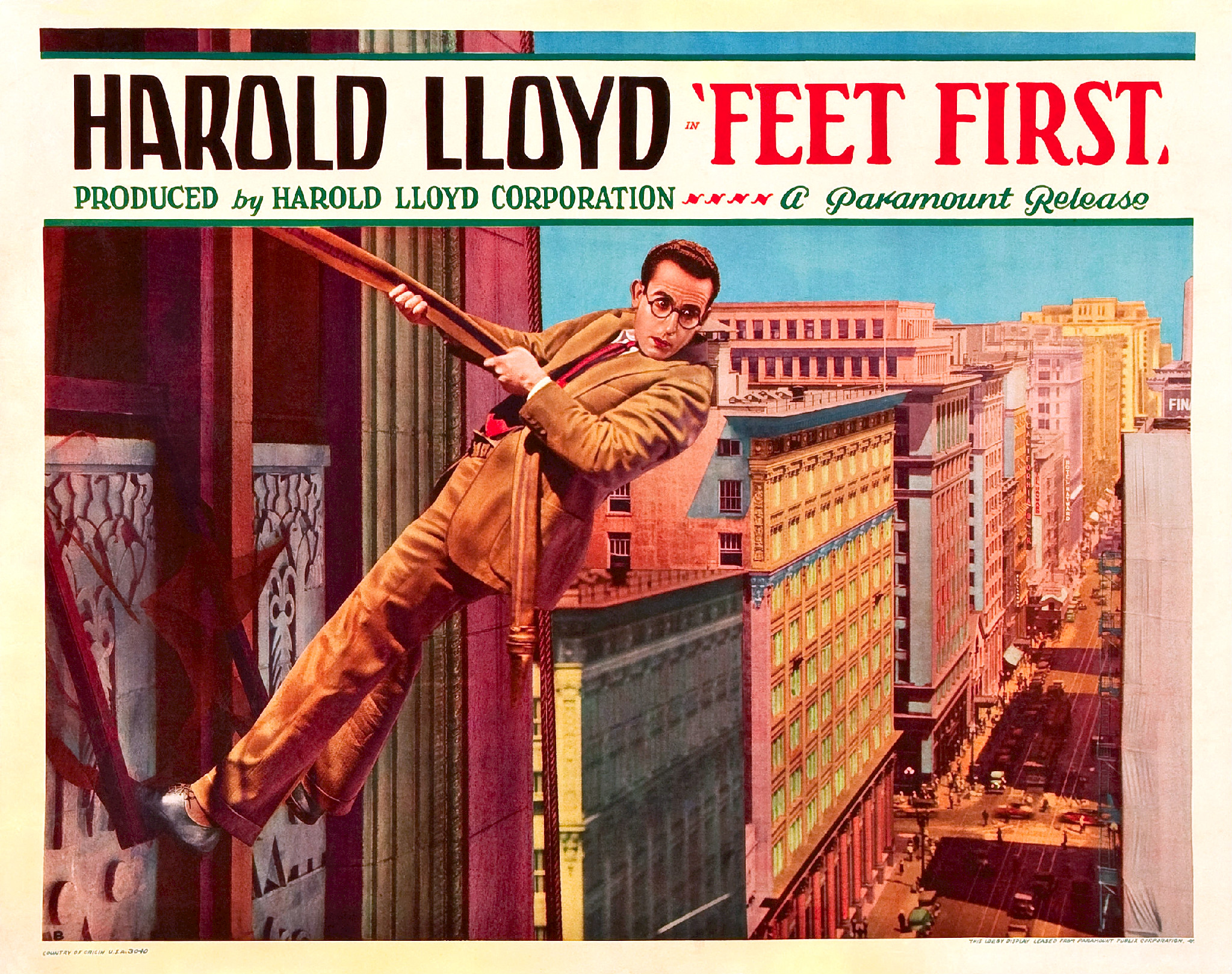
Lobby card

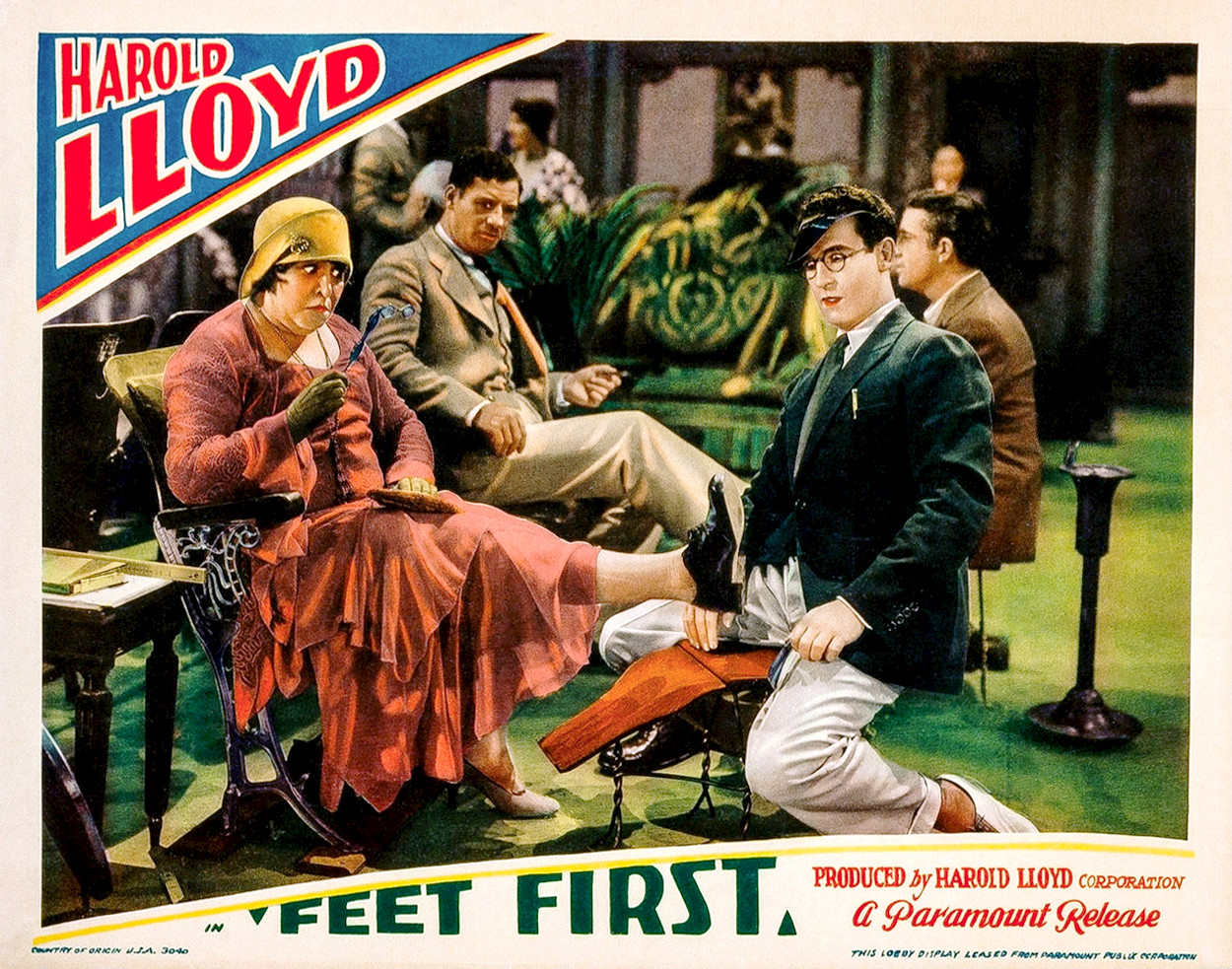
Lobby card

=== Co-star ===
This was Lloyd's second film with Barbara Kent, and the last occasion on which he would appear with the same leading lady.

=== Stunts ===
The skyscraper sequence used techniques similar to those on Lloyd's most famous film, the silent Safety Last! (1923). The scene was filmed without special effects or back projection. Before the scene in the 1962 compilation film Harold Lloyd's World of Comedy (produced by Lloyd), a title card reads:

"This sequence was made without trick photography and before process was perfected. The action — at all times — actually occurred as high up as you see it happen."

The impression of height was achieved by use of a skyscraper façade built on the roof of the Southern California Gas Company building at 848 South Broadway in Los Angeles. Lloyd had previously used this technique in Safety Last! at a location only a few blocks away from that used for Feet First. The concluding sequence of the climb, in which Harold Horne falls from the building with a rope attached to his foot, briefly uses back projection for a mid shot. In the background, the Eastern Columbia Building and Cecil Hotel can be seen.

=== Rereleases ===
The film was rereleased in the 1960s as part of the feature Harold Lloyd's World of Comedy, in which Lloyd overdubbed some of his original dialogue, including changing the name of a black character originally named Charcoal. He also added a dramatic underscore to the climb sequence that was composed by Walter Scharf. In the original release, the scene had no music.

The film was rereleased in segments as part of Time-Life's Harold Lloyd's World of Comedy television series in the 1970s. However, as the majority of the clips in the series originated from silent films, the soundtrack was removed for the Feet First segments. The film has since been released on DVD in its correct format.

== See also ==
- Harold Lloyd filmography
- List of American films of 1930
- List of United States comedy films
