= Benjamin Stoloff =

American film director (1895-1960)

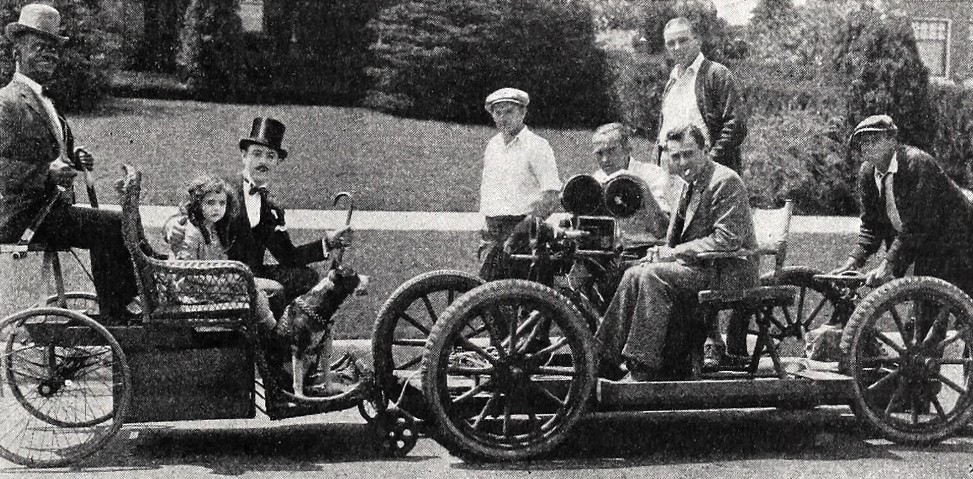
- Still from Sweet Marie (1925) with Stoloff seated with cigar in the film car
- Born: October 6, 1895; Philadelphia, Pennsylvania, U.S.
- Died: September 8, 1960 (aged 64); Hollywood, California, U.S.
- Occupations: Director, producer
- Years active: 1920–1960

Benjamin Stoloff (October 6, 1895 – September 8, 1960) was an American film director and producer. He began his career as a director of short films, and he moved into directing and producing feature films.

== Background ==
During late October of 1930, after six weeks of filming the Rube Goldberg comedy, "Soup to Nuts," Stoloff, the film's director reportedly told news reporters that "never in all his experience of directing thirty-three pictures for Fox Films, many of which were comedies, had he worked with such irresistible and uncontrollable 'nuts' as Ted Healy and Rube Goldberg."

In 1931, he directed Victor McLaglen and Fay Wray in "Not Exactly Gentlemen." In 1935, he directed Jack Benny, Nancy Carroll and Gene Raymond in "Transatlantic Merry-Go-Round," which was subsequently released by United Artists.

== Director filmography ==
=== 1940s–1950s ===
- Home Run Derby (1959) – TV series
- Footlight Varieties (1951)
- It's a Joke, Son! (1947)
- Johnny Comes Flying Home (1946)
- Take It or Leave It (1944)
- Bermuda Mystery (1944)
- The Mysterious Doctor (1943)
- The Hidden Hand (1942)
- Secret Enemies (1942)
- Three Sons o' Guns (1941)
- The Great Mr. Nobody (1941)
- The Marines Fly High (1940)

=== 1930s ===
- The Lady and the Mob (1939)
- The Affairs of Annabel (1938)
- Radio City Revels (1938)
- Fight for Your Lady (1937)
- Super-Sleuth (1937)
- Sea Devils (1937)
- Don't Turn 'Em Loose (1936)
- Two in the Dark (1936)
- To Beat the Band (1935)
- Swellhead (1935)
- Transatlantic Merry-Go-Round (1934)
- Palooka (1934)
- Night of Terror (1933)
- Obey the Law (1933)
- The Devil Is Driving (1932)
- The Night Mayor (1932)
- By Whose Hand? (1932)
- Destry Rides Again (1932)
- Perfect Control (1932)
- Slide, Babe, Slide (1932)
- No Greater Love (1932)
- Goldie (1931)
- Three Rogues (1931)
- Not Exactly Gentlemen (1931)
- Soup to Nuts (1930)
- New Movietone Follies of 1930 (1930)

=== 1920s ===
- The Girl from Havana (1929)
- Happy Days (1929/I)
- Protection (1929)
- Speakeasy (1929)
- The Bath Between (1928)
- Plastered in Paris (1928)
- A Horseman of the Plains (1928)
- Mind Your Business (1928)
- Silver Valley (1927)
- The Gay Retreat (1927)
- The Circus Ace (1927)
- The Canyon of Light (1926)
- It's a Pipe (1926)
- Matrimony Blues (1926)
- The Mad Racer (1926)
- The Fighting Tailor (1926)
- East Side, West Side (1925)
- The Heart Breaker (1925)
- Sweet Marie (1925)
- Roaring Lions at Home (1924)
- Stolen Sweeties (1924)
- In-Bad the Sailor (1924)
- Stretching the Truth (1924)
- When Wise Ducks Meet (1924)
- On the Job (1924)

=== Screenwriter ===
- Gas House Kids Go West (1947)

=== Producer ===
- Law of the Tropics (1941)
- The Spiritualist (1948), also known as The Amazing Mr. X
- The Cobra Strikes (1948)
