= Stretching the Truth =

1924 film

Stretching the Truth is a 1924 short comedy silent film directed by Philadelphian director, Benjamin Stoloff. It was released by Fox Film.
