= The Pooch =

1932 film

- Directed by: Robert F. McGowan
- Written by: Hal Roach; H. M. Walker
- Produced by: Robert F. McGowan; Hal Roach
- Cinematography: Art Lloyd
- Edited by: Richard C. Currier
- Music by: Leroy Shield; Marvin Hatley
- Distributed by: MGM
- Release date: June 14, 1932
- Running time: 20' 12"
- Country: United States
- Language: English

The Pooch is a 1932 Our Gang short comedy film directed by Robert F. McGowan. It was the 115th Our Gang short to be released.

== Plot ==
The film follows cheerful vagrant Stymie and the younger Spanky as they trek through the neighborhood in search of food, with their dog, Pete the Pup, in tow. Their attempts at procuring food are mostly unsuccessful; the pair are turned away from a restaurant for not having any money. Their luck changes, however, when Stymie manages to scheme a woman out of some food under the pretense that it is for Petey, his dog.

Soon after, a mean dogcatcher (Budd Fine) is seen with the rest of the gang's dogs in the back of his truck. Stymie, who wants to get back in the good graces of the gang after having previously stolen their pies, intends to win back their affections by freeing their dogs from the dogcatcher's wagon. He is successful, and, after a brief misunderstanding, is allowed back into the gang.

Enraged, the dogcatcher tries to capture Petey. The gang fights back, with Stymie grappling onto the dog catcher's leg and biting him, as Spanky and the other kids pelt the dogcatcher with rocks, eggs, and lettuce. This is to no avail, as the dogcatcher eventually escapes their attack and vengefully bundles Petey off to the pound, intending to consign the dog to the gas chamber unless Stymie brings him five dollars.

Desperately, Stymie prays for the five dollars necessary to spring Pete, whereupon a five-dollar bill blows out of the hands of a lady shopper and lands at Stymie's feet. After outsmarting a cop whom thinks Stymie has stolen the money, he and the gang race to the dog pound.

An employee of the dog pound approaches the dog catcher, informing him that he cannot get Pete gassed, but is prevented from explaining why as the enraged dog catcher rejects his attempted words, preventing him from interfering in his business. As the dog catcher seals Petey inside the gas chamber the employee attempts to get the dog catcher's attention once more and is once again angrily dismissed.

Upon the gang's arrival, the dog catcher smugly declares that he has already gassed Petey and that the dog is now dead. Stymie begins to cry, and he and the gang mourn until the employee from earlier returns, kneels down to comfort Stymie, and assures him that Petey is not dead.

To the dismay of the dogcatcher, the employee informs him that the chamber cannot operate, as there is no gas in the cylinders. The dogcatcher opens the door to the gas chamber to find Petey sitting inside, alive. Petey rushes out and chases the dog catcher, with the gang following.

== Cast ==
=== The Gang ===
- George McFarland as Spanky
- Matthew Beard as Stymie
- Sherwood Bailey as Spud
- Dorothy DeBorba as Dorothy
- Kendall McComas as Breezy Brisbane
- Bobby Hutchins as Wheezer
- Harold Wertz as Bouncy
- Pete the Pup as himself
- Laughing Gravy as himself

=== Additional cast ===
- Artye Folz as Girl who Reads
- Dickie Jackson as Boy with donuts
- Harry Bernard as Officer
- Baldwin Cooke as Diner attendant
- Estelle Etterre as First housewife
- Budd Fine as Budd, the dog catcher
- Dick Gilbert as Co-worker at dog pound
- May Wallace as Second housewife

== Note ==
- The Pooch is a semi-remake of the 1927 film Love My Dog.
- This is the last entry featuring the second Pete the Pup. His trainer was fired from Hal Roach studios. Other unrelated dogs aired as Pete the Pup until 1938.
- This episode was edited for perceived racial content toward African Americans and the mistreatment of children by about five minutes from the syndicated Little Rascals television in 1971. The film was reinstated in its entirety on its AMC airings from 2001-2003.

== See also ==
- Our Gang filmography
