= The Fighting Tailor =

1926 film

- Directed by: Benjamin Stoloff
- Starring: George Harris; Barbara Luddy
- Release date: 1926
- Country: United States
- Languages: Silent film English intertitles

The Fighting Tailor is a 1926 short comedy silent film directed by Philadelphian director, Benjamin Stoloff starring George Harris and Barbara Luddy.
