= Harold Lloyd's World of Comedy =

World of Comedy
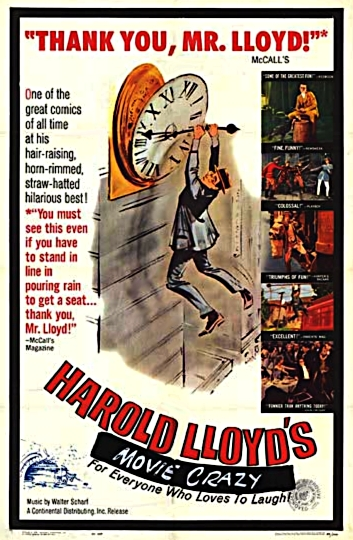
- Directed by: Harold Lloyd
- Produced by: Harold Lloyd; John. L. Murphy
- Starring: Harold Lloyd
- Music by: Walter Scharf
- Distributed by: Continental Distributing
- Release date: 1962
- Running time: 94 minutes
- Country: United States
- Language: English

Harold Lloyd's World of Comedy, also known as World of Comedy, is a 1962 American documentary compilation of scenes from Harold Lloyd's best-known films. The clips were personally selected by Lloyd, who also wrote the voiceover narration.

== Plot ==
The film marked the return of Lloyd to cinemas after an absence of almost two decades, and it included extended excerpts from the classics Safety Last! and Feet First, which had not been publicly screened during the previous three decades.

== Reception ==
The film was well received by most critics and audiences as a reminder of Lloyd's creative output as the third (with Charlie Chaplin and Buster Keaton) of the "Big 3" great silent comedy filmmakers. It was premiered at the 1962 Cannes Film Festival, where it received a standing ovation.

Although enthusiastically well received by audiences with fond memories of Lloyd's films, the reception by younger critics was slightly more reserved. Specific criticisms include the lack of context for some of the clips and closing narration.

== See also ==
- Harold Lloyd filmography
