= Bobbie Beard =

American child actor (1930–99)

Bobbie "Cotton" Beard
- Born: August 2, 1930; Los Angeles, California, U.S.
- Died: October 16, 1999 (aged 69); Los Angeles, California, U.S.
- Occupation: Actor
- Years active: 1931–1934

Bobbie Beard (August 2, 1930 – October 16, 1999) was an American child actor, best known for portraying "Cotton" in several Our Gang short films from 1932 to 1934. He was a native of Los Angeles, California. His older brother was Matthew "Stymie" Beard, one of the series' most popular and best-remembered characters.

== Our Gang years ==
As older brother Stymie was the main breadwinner for the Beard family, his success with the Our Gang series opened the door for his siblings. Bobbie Beard appeared as Stymie's younger brother in Hi'-Neighbor!, Forgotten Babies, Fish Hooky, A Lad an' a Lamp and Birthday Blues. His most memorable appearance was in A Lad an' a Lamp, in which Spanky McFarland keeps wishing that Cotton could be a monkey. Despite his notable presence in several films, Beard never spoke a word.

== Later years and death ==
After departing Our Gang, Beard became an auction dealer in the Los Angeles area. In later years, Beard worked at the Hillcrest Country Club in Los Angeles and became good friends with Groucho Marx. He later served in the Korean War, and spent his final years working for the Los Angeles School Board.

Beard died on October 16, 1999.
