= In-Bad the Sailor =

1924 film

- Directed by: Benjamin Stoloff (as Ben Stoloff)
- Distributed by: Fox Film
- Release date: September 14, 1924
- Country: United States
- Languages: Silent film English intertitles

In-Bad the Sailor is a 1924 short comedy silent film directed by Philadelphian director, Benjamin Stoloff.
