= Free Eats =

1932 film

- Directed by: Ray McCarey
- Written by: H. M. Walker
- Produced by: Robert F. McGowan; Hal Roach
- Cinematography: Art Lloyd
- Edited by: Richard C. Currier
- Music by: Leroy Shield; Marvin Hatley
- Distributed by: Metro-Goldwyn-Mayer
- Release date: February 13, 1932
- Running time: 19:03
- Country: United States
- Language: English

Free Eats is a 1932 Our Gang short comedy film directed by Ray McCarey. It was the 112th Our Gang short to be released.

== Plot ==
The gang along with other poor children in the town are given a party with games and great food to eat. In addition, each child would be given a food basket to bring home to their parents. It's given by a wealthy woman whose husband is running for office. Meanwhile a couple of criminals have set up two midgets to come to the party as babies. They would steal expensive jewelry and planned on robbing a safe filled with money. Stymie caught the "fidgets" in the safe. After an altercation with Stymie, the rest of the gang come to Stymie's rescue as the midgets pull a gun. An alarm goes off and the police come to arrest the midgets. Episode concludes with the police sergeant spitting tobacco into a nearby waste can, from which the missing midget then rises, telling the "flatfoot" to call his shots.

== Cast ==
=== The Gang ===
- Sherwood Bailey as Spud
- Matthew Beard as Stymie
- Dorothy DeBorba as Dorothy
- Bobby Hutchins as Wheezer
- Kendall McComas as Breezy Brisbane
- George McFarland as Spanky
- Pete the Pup as himself

=== Additional cast ===
- Donald Haines as Kid getting cake in face at party
- Eddie Baker as Detective's assistant
- Harry Bernard as Officer Flaherty
- Lillian Elliott as Mrs. Clark
- Estelle Etterre as Estelle, a lawn-party guest
- Paul Fix as Elvira, 'wife' of the head of the family of thieves
- Otto Fries as Detective
- Billy Gilbert as Head of the family of thieves
- Dell Henderson as Mr. Moran
- Tiny Lawrence as Waldemar, midget
- Major Mite as Elmer, smaller midget
- May Wallace as Friend of Mrs. Clark

== Notes ==
Free Eats marked the debut appearance of George "Spanky" McFarland. He and his brother Tommy auditioned for Our Gang in the spring of 1931, with Spanky passing a screen test easily. Tommy also appeared in many Our Gang film in bit roles.

== Reception ==
The Motion Picture Herald said that the short provided "innumerable laughs".

== See also ==
- Our Gang filmography
