= The Heart Breaker =

1925 film

- Directed by: Benjamin Stoloff
- Starring: Judy King; Jerry Madden; Sid Smith
- Distributed by: Fox Film Corporation
- Release date: 1925
- Country: United States
- Languages: Silent film English intertitles

The Heart Breaker is a 1925 American short comedy film directed by Philadelphian director, Benjamin Stoloff.

== Cast ==
- Judy King
- Jerry Madden as Little boy
- Sid Smith
- Dagmar Oakland
