= Jules Cowles =

American film actor (1877–1943)

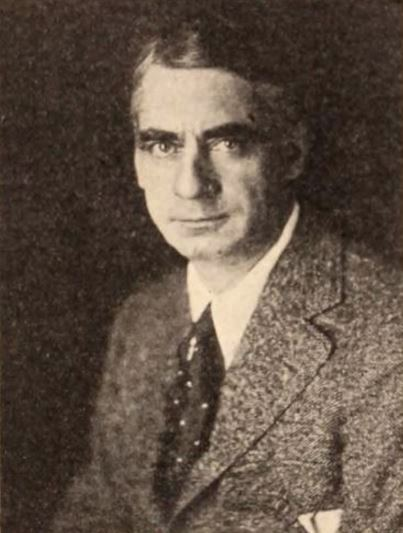
- Cowles featured in Exhibitors Herald, 1920
- Born: October 18, 1877; Farmington, Connecticut; United States
- Died: May 22, 1943 (aged 65); Hollywood, California; United States
- Other names: J. D. Cowles; Julius D. Cowles
- Occupation: Actor
- Years active: 1914–1943 (film)

Jules Cowles (October 18, 1877 – May 22, 1943) was an American film actor. He was also billed as J. D. Cowles and Julius D. Cowles.

== Biography ==
Born in Farmington, Connecticut, Cowles attended Yale University and was a writer in addition to being an actor. Before he began acting in films, he performed in a Shakespearean repertory company with Augustin Daly for five years.

Cowles died on May 22, 1943, in Hollywood, California, aged 65.

== Selected filmography ==
- A Royal Family (1915)
- Notorious Gallagher (1916)
- The Bar Sinister (1917)
- The Service Star (1918)
- To the Highest Bidder (1919)
- The Poor Rich Man (1918)
- The Cambric Mask (1919)
- A Fool and His Money (1920)
- Tangled Trails (1921)
- The Idol of the North (1921)
- The Bootleggers (1922)
- The Ne'er-Do-Well (1923)
- Lost in a Big City (1923)
- The Love Bandit (1924)
- High Speed (1924)
- The Lost World (1925)
- Seven Chances (1925)
- Sweet Marie (1925)
- Spook Ranch (1925)
- Lord Jim (1925)
- Money to Burn (1926)
- The Scarlet Letter (1926)
- The Show (1927)
- The Road to Romance (1927)
- Mockery (1927)
- London After Midnight (1927)
- Sal of Singapore (1928)
- Dog Law (1928)
- Isle of Lost Men (1928)
- Why Sailors Go Wrong (1928)
- Terror Mountain (1928)
- Thundergod (1928)
- Bringing Up Father (1928)
- The Leatherneck (1929)
- His First Command (1929)
- One Hysterical Night (1929)
- Sea Devils (1931)
- Heaven on Earth (1931)
- Secret Menace (1931)
- Renegades of the West (1932)
- The Fighting Parson (1933)
- Cross Fire (1933)
- The Scarlet Letter (1934)
- The Pursuit of Happiness (1934)
- Law Beyond the Range (1935)

== Bibliography ==
- Munden, Kenneth White. The American Film Institute Catalog of Motion Pictures Produced in the United States, Part 1. University of California Press, 1997.
