= Swellhead =

1935 film

- Directed by: Benjamin Stoloff
- Written by: Gerald Beaumont; William Jacobs
- Produced by: Bryan Foy
- Starring: Wallace Ford; Dickie Moore; Barbara Kent
- Cinematography: Joseph A. Valentine
- Edited by: Arthur Hilton
- Production company: Bryan Foy Productions
- Distributed by: Columbia Pictures
- Release date: May 4, 1935
- Running time: 63 minutes
- Country: United States
- Language: English

Swellhead is a 1935 American comedy drama film directed by Benjamin Stoloff and starring Wallace Ford, Dickie Moore and Barbara Kent.

== Plot ==
A cocky baseball player is forever bragging about his success on the field, and off it with woman. However, after he suffers in an accident, his luck seems to have turned against him.

== Cast ==
- Wallace Ford as Terry McCall
- Dickie Moore as Billy Malone
- Barbara Kent as Mary Malone
- J. Farrell MacDonald as Umpire
- Marion Byron as Bessie
- Sammy Cohen as Casey Cohen
- Mike Donlin as Brick Baldwin
- Frank Moran as The Rube
- Bryant Washburn as Malone

== Bibliography ==
- Dick, Bernard F. (2010). Columbia Pictures: Portrait of a Studio. University Press of Kentucky. ISBN 978-0813130194.
