= Sweet Marie =

1925 film

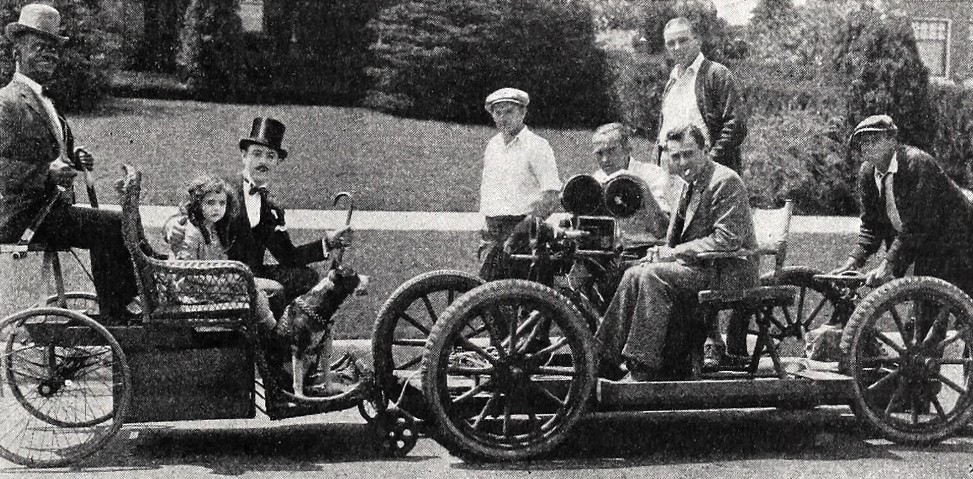
- Still with Virginia Marshall and Sid Smith in the prop car and director Stoloff in the camera car
- Directed by: Benjamin Stoloff
- Starring: Sid Smith
- Distributed by: Fox Film
- Release date: 1925
- Running time: 2 reels
- Country: United States
- Language: Silent (English intertitles)

Sweet Marie is a 1925 American short silent comedy film directed by Philadelphian director Benjamin Stoloff and starring Sid Smith.

== Cast ==
- Sid Smith as Doughboy
- Judy King as Sweet Marie
- Jules Cowles as The Top Sergeant
- Pal the Dog as Pal
- Virginia Marshall as Little Girl (uncredited)
