= Exposed (1932 film) =

1932 film

- Directed by: Albert Herman
- Written by: Mauri Grashin
- Produced by: Morris Shiller
- Starring: William Collier Jr.; Barbara Kent; Raymond Hatton
- Production company: Eagle Pictures
- Distributed by: Arthur Greenblatt Distribution Service; Butcher's Film Service (UK)
- Release date: September 1932
- Running time: 63 minutes
- Country: United States
- Language: English

Exposed is a 1932 American pre-Code crime film directed by Albert Herman and starring William Collier Jr., Barbara Kent and Raymond Hatton. It was released in Britain by Butcher's Film Service under the alternative title of Strange Roads.

== Plot ==
A doctor is hired by gangster to work providing medical treatment to his gang. However, when the doctor's policeman friend is gunned down by the gang he sets out to expose them by gathering information on their activities.

== Cast ==
- William Collier Jr. as Jim Harper
- Barbara Kent as Ruth
- Raymond Hatton as Marty
- Bobby 'Wheezer' Hutchins as Danny
- Walter McGrail as Johnny Russo
- Roy Stewart as Officer Dillon
- John Ince as Chief of Police
- Billy Engle

== Bibliography ==
- Langman, Larry & Finn, Daniel. A Guide to American Crime Films of the Thirties. Greenwood Press, 1995.
