= When Wise Ducks Meet =

1924 film

- Directed by: Benjamin Stoloff
- Distributed by: Fox Film
- Release date: 1924
- Country: USA

When Wise Ducks Meet is a 1924 two-reel, comedy film directed by Benjamin Stoloff and Clyde Carruth. The primary roles were played by ducks. It was released by Fox Film.
