= The Ne'er-Do-Well =

1923 film by Alfred E. Green

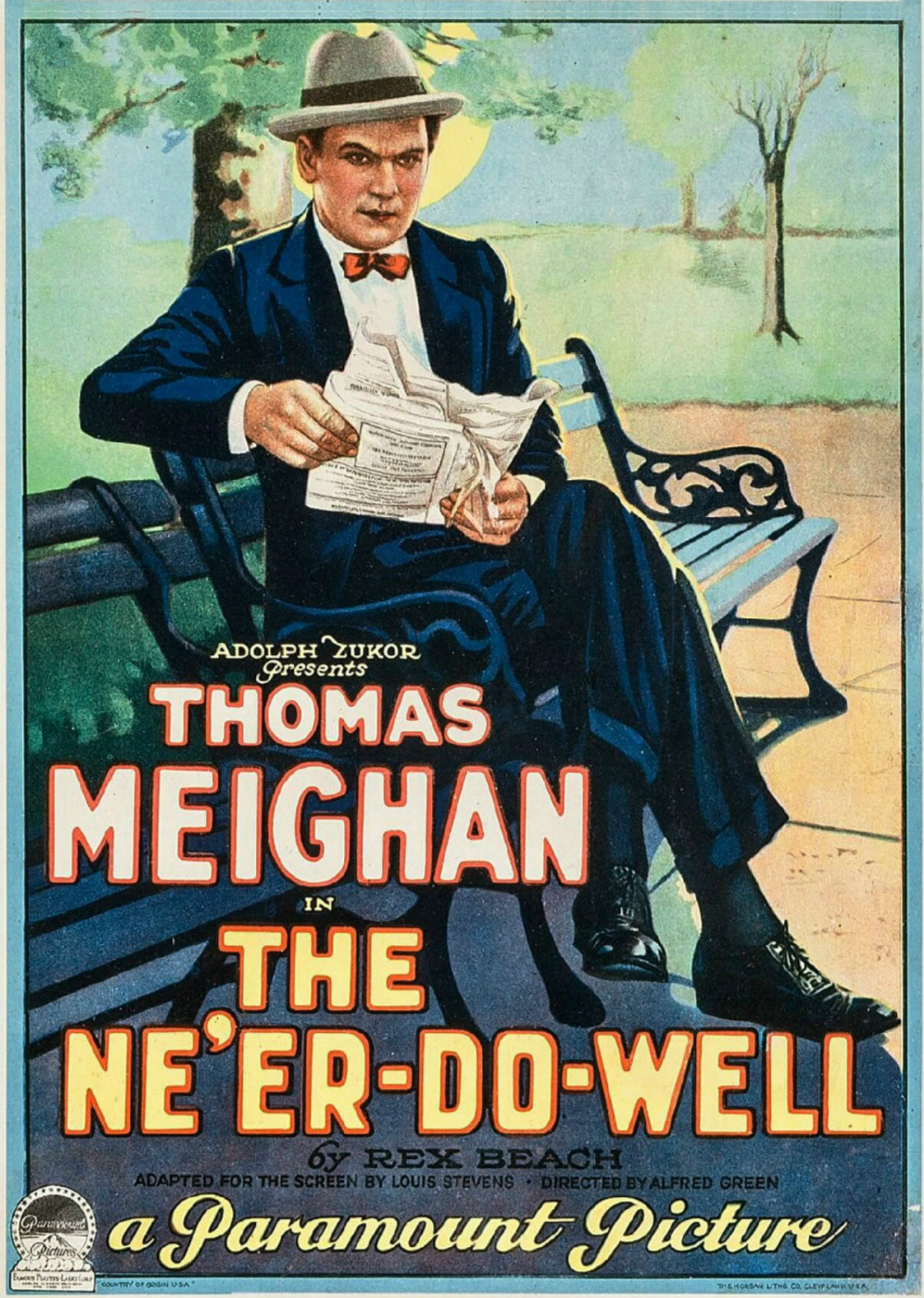
- Theatrical poster
- Directed by: Alfred E. Green
- Screenplay by: Rex Beach; Louis Stevens
- Based on: The Ne'er-Do-Well by Rex Beach
- Produced by: William Nicholas Selig; Adolph Zukor
- Starring: Thomas Meighan; Lila Lee; Gertrude Astor; John Miltern; Gus Weinberg; Sidney Smith
- Cinematography: Ernest Haller; William Miller
- Production company: Famous Players–Lasky Corporation
- Distributed by: Paramount Pictures
- Release date: April 29, 1923
- Running time: 80 minutes
- Country: United States
- Language: Silent (English intertitles)

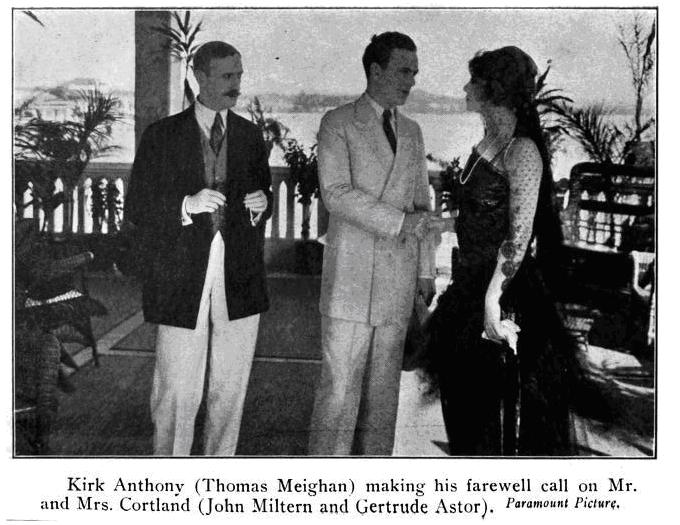
l to r:John Miltern, Thomas Meighan and Gertrude Astor.

The Ne'er-Do-Well is a 1923 American comedy silent film directed by Alfred E. Green. The film stars Thomas Meighan, Lila Lee, Gertrude Astor, John Miltern, Gus Weinberg, and Sidney Smith. The screenplay by Rex Beach and Louis Stevens is based on Rex Beach's 1911 novel of the same name. The film was released on April 29, 1923, by Paramount Pictures.

A previous version of the story was released in 1916.

== Plot ==
Disgusted with his spendthrift son, Kirk Anthony's father has Kirk shanghaied and taken to Panama, where he attracts the attention of Mrs. Edith Cortlandt and falls in love with Chiquita, the daughter of a Panamanian general. He is able to get a railroad job through Edith's husband Stephen Cortlandt and decides to make something of himself when he meets Allen Allan, a Negro soldier of fortune. When the sudden death of Stephen Cortlandt ensues, Kirk is blamed until Edith produces a suicide note and clears his name. He succeeds in his railroad position and returns to the United States with Chiquita and is finally able to earn his father's respect.

== Cast ==
- Thomas Meighan as Kirk Anthony
- Lila Lee as Chiquita
- Gertrude Astor as Edith Cortlandt
- John Miltern as Stephen Cortlandt
- Gus Weinberg as Andres Garavel
- Sidney Smith as Ramón Alfarez
- George O'Brien as Clifford
- Jules Cowles as Allen Allan
- Larry Wheat as Runnels
- Cyril Ring

== Production ==
Exteriors for The Ne’er-Do-Well were shot on location in Panama. For the aerial shots of the Panama Canal, Arthur Cozine (location manager) and William Miller (cinematographer) ascended in two Martin Bombers to photograph the canal. Interiors were completed in New York.

== Preservation ==
No known prints are known to exist, making the film lost.

== See also ==
- Gertrude Astor filmography
