= Stolen Sweeties =

1924 film

Stolen Sweeties is a 1924 2-reel short comedy silent film directed by Philadelphian director, Benjamin Stoloff. It was released by Fox Film.
