= County Hospital (film) =

1932 film

- Directed by: James Parrott
- Written by: H.M. Walker
- Produced by: Hal Roach
- Starring: Stan Laurel; Oliver Hardy
- Cinematography: Art Lloyd
- Edited by: Richard C. Currier; Bert Jordan
- Music by: Marvin Hatley; Leroy Shield
- Distributed by: Metro-Goldwyn-Mayer
- Release date: June 25, 1932
- Running time: 18:52
- Country: United States
- Language: English

County Hospital is a Laurel and Hardy short film made in 1932. It was directed by James Parrott, produced by Hal Roach and distributed by Metro-Goldwyn-Mayer. Ollie is in hospital with a broken leg, Stan comes to visit and ends up getting Ollie kicked out; on the way home Stan crashes the car.

== Plot ==
Ollie finds himself hospitalized with a broken leg, with Stan visiting him out of a lack of other engagements, bearing a less-than-ideal gift of hard-boiled eggs and nuts. Ollie expresses dissatisfaction with the gift lamenting the absence of candy Stan reminds Oliver of an unpaid debt for a previous box of candy. A comedic mishap ensues when Stan accidentally spills water, prompting Ollie to retaliate by hitting him with a bedpan.

Their antics escalate when the doctor arrives to examine Ollie, delivering the news that he must remain hospitalized for a lengthy two-month period. In a classic display of slapstick comedy, Stan inadvertently triggers a series of events resulting in the doctor's unfortunate encounter with a traction weight, leading to a precarious situation where the doctor dangles from the window while Ollie's leg becomes suspended from the ceiling. The doctor's fury prompts him to promptly eject both Ollie and Stan from the hospital. Ollie, irritated by the disruption to his "nice peaceful time," demands his clothes as they prepare to depart. However, Stan's clumsy antics continue as he inadvertently ruins the trousers of Ollie's roommate and suffers the consequences of sitting on a sedative-loaded hypodermic needle, much to the amusement of the nurse.

Their misadventures persist as Stan attempts to drive Ollie home, but succumbs to drowsiness induced by the sedative. The ensuing chaotic journey sees their car careening wildly through the streets, culminating in a collision between two streetcars that leaves their vehicle bent at a 90-degree angle, trapping them in a cycle of futile attempts to navigate the streets.

== Cast ==
- Stan Laurel (himself)
- Oliver Hardy (himself)
- Billy Gilbert as the doctor
- May Wallace as Miss Wallace, head nurse
- Estelle Etterre as Nurse Smith
- William Austin as Ollie's hospital roommate
- Belle Hare as a nurse
- Lilyan Irene as a nurse
- Dorothy Layton as a nurse
- Sam Lufkin as a police officer
- Baldwin Cooke as an orderly
- Ham Kinsey as an orderly
- Frank Holliday as a visitor

== Filming locations ==
The front-entrance facade of Culver City's 1928 City Hall building at 9770 Culver Blvd. was used as the exterior of the "County Hospital" where Stan Laurel makes an unwelcome visit to the recuperating Oliver Hardy. The facade of the City Hall was salvaged as the freestanding frontispiece of its 1995 replacement.
