= Dagmar Oakland =

American actress (1897–1989)

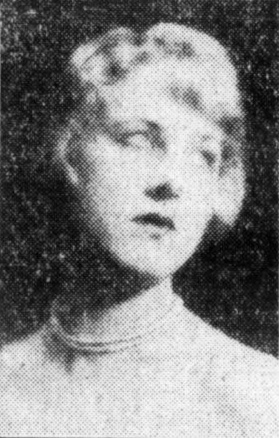
- Born: Edna Martine Dagmar Andersen; August 21, 1897; San Francisco, California, U.S.
- Died: October 8, 1989 (aged 92); Burbank, California, U.S.
- Occupation: Actress

Dagmar Oakland (born Edna Martine Dagmar Andersen; August 21, 1897 – October 8, 1989) was an American actress of stage and screen from San Francisco, California. Twice she was a member of the Ziegfeld Follies.

== Family ==
Oakland's parents were Edward Andersen of Fredrikstad, Norway and Anna Marthine Olsen, also of Norway. Her siblings' names were Edward, Herbert (née Hagbart), and Vivien. Her sister performed on Broadway and in motion pictures as Vivien Oakland. After the 1906 San Francisco earthquake, Anna Andersen, a widow since 1898, moved the family to Oakland, California, where the sisters took their stage names.

== Stage ==
Edna and Vivien appeared in vaudeville as the Anker sisters (an old family name). They changed their surname to Oakland in tribute to their hometown. They performed as the Oakland Sisters in the Boston Juveniles, a vaudeville group.

They traveled the west coast as far as Seattle, Washington. The sisters ended up in New York City, appearing with the Ziegfeld Follies and other shows. In 1915, Oakland began a solo stage career. In November 1924, she had an important role in Heidelberg, the musical version of a play made famous by Richard Mansfield.

== Film career ==
Beginning in 1930, Oakland performed in Hollywood motion pictures. Her first feature was The Heart Breaker (1930) directed by Edmund Joseph. She was cast with Joan Blondell, Gloria Shea, and Walter Kinsella. She played a reporter in Wedding Present (1936) and a nurse in Hit Parade of 1937. Oakland's film career lasted into the late 1940s with uncredited roles in Tonight and Every Night (1945), Thrill of a Romance (1945), and Riverboat Rhythm (1946).

== Marriage ==
In 1919, she married Captain Garnette Rotan, who served with distinction in World War I and later wrote as a theatre critic under the name Pierre de Rohan. Their romance began in 1917 when Oakland was playing in a Broadway theater production. They divorced in 1925. The actress became engaged to English actor Thomas Oliver Neville Clark. Clark was deported from America in June 1935 because he overstayed his visitor's permit.
