= Beauty Parlor =

1932 film by Richard Thorpe

- Film poster
- Directed by: Richard Thorpe
- Written by: Marion Orth; Harry Sauber
- Produced by: George R. Batcheller
- Starring: Barbara Kent; Joyce Compton; John Harron
- Cinematography: M.A. Anderson
- Production company: Invincible Pictures
- Distributed by: Chesterfield Pictures
- Release date: June 15, 1932
- Running time: 64 minutes
- Country: United States
- Language: English

Beauty Parlor is a pre-Code 1932 American drama film directed by Richard Thorpe and starring Barbara Kent, Joyce Compton and John Harron.

== Plot ==
Two manicurists mingle with the customers of a hotel barbershop.

== Cast ==
- Barbara Kent as Sally Dale
- Joyce Compton as Joan Perry
- John Harron as Jeffery Colt
- Dorothy Revier as Stella Fremont
- Albert Gran as Burke
- Wheeler Oakman as Fremont
- Mischa Auer as Herman Bauer
- Betty Mack as Lou
- Harry C. Bradley as Henry Mason

== Bibliography ==
- Pitts, Michael R. Poverty Row Studios, 1929-1940. McFarland & Company, 2005.
