= Sid Smith (actor) =

American actor and filmmaker

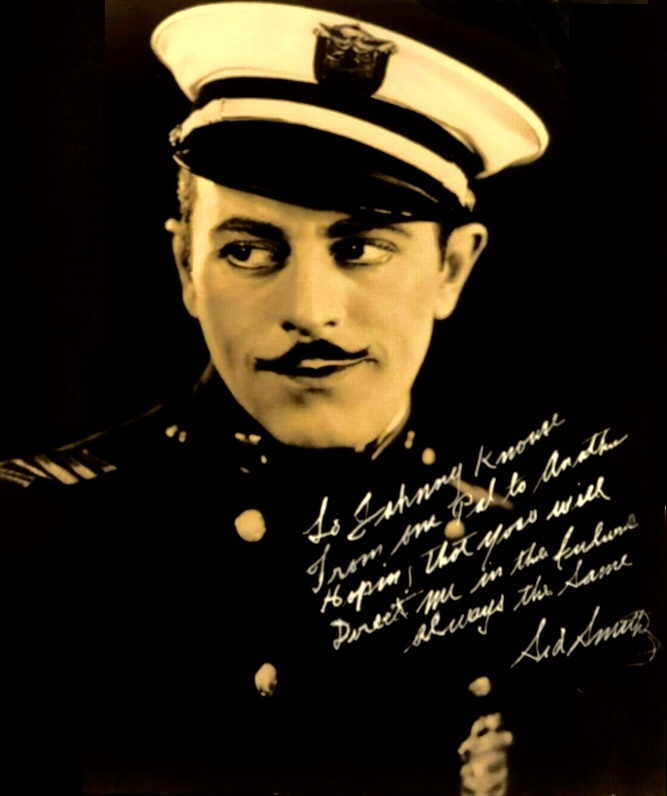
- Born: Sidney Smith; February 28, 1892; Faribault, Minnesota, U.S.
- Died: July 4, 1928 (aged 36); Hollywood, California
- Burial place: Hollywood Forever Cemetery
- Occupation: Comedian
- Years active: 1911–1928
- Spouse: Ruth Beckman (m. 1915; div. 1921)

Sidney Smith (February 28, 1892 – July 4, 1928), known on-screen as Sid Smith, was an American actor and director who appeared in short comedy films. Smith entered the motion picture industry in 1911, and eventually performed in 187 releases- most of them short silent film comedies, directing six shorts in total. Smith had his own starring series, but also worked in support of such comics as Monty Banks at Warner Bros. and Billy Bevan at the Mack Sennett studio. Smith died of alcohol poisoning, attributed to his consumption of bad liquor at a Malibu beach party. Perhaps because of the Prohibition laws then in effect, one of the few trade papers covering Smith's passing gave the cause of death as “heart trouble.”

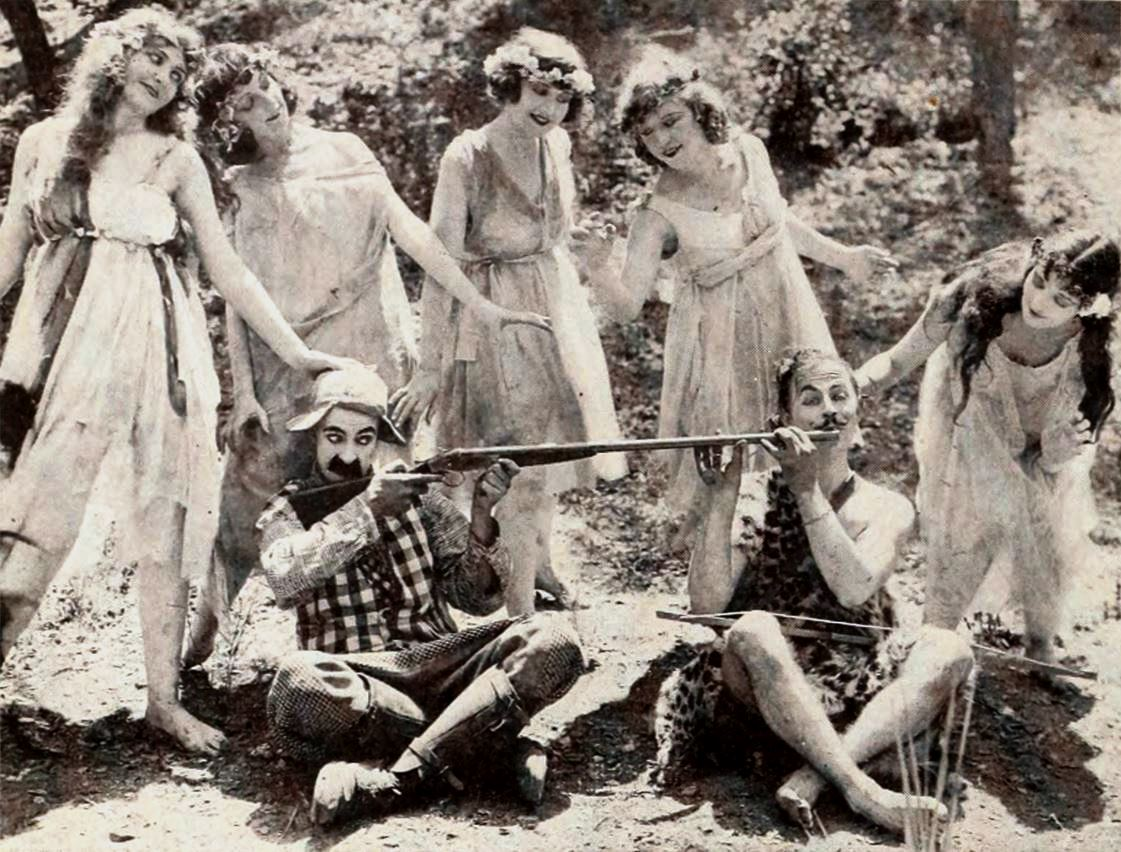
Charles Dorety and Sid Smith in an unidentified 1919 comedy short film

== Filmography ==
- The Awful Adventures of an Aviator (1915), partially survives
- The Ne'er-Do-Well (1916)
- Kismet (1920)
- Tell Us, Ouija! (1920)
- We'll Get You Yet (1921), reissued by Pathescope in the UK in the 1930s as James & the Brown Hand
- Better Late Than Never (1922)
- The Ne'er-Do-Well (1923)
- Sweet Marie (1925)
- The Heart Breaker (1925)
- Dugan of the Dugouts (1928)
- One Spooky Night (1928)
- Heave-Ho (1928), with Teddy Reavis. Extant.

== Bibliography ==
- Brent E. Walker. Mack Sennett’s Fun Factory: A History and Filmography of His Studio and His Keystone and Mack Sennett Comedies, with Biographies of Players and Personnel. McFarland, 2013.
- Editors. South East. Motion Picture News, July 11, 1928.
