= Her Forgotten Past =

1933 film

- Directed by: Wesley Ford
- Written by: George Morgan
- Produced by: Wesley Ford
- Starring: Monte Blue; Barbara Kent; Henry B. Walthall
- Cinematography: James S. Brown Jr.
- Edited by: Fred Bain
- Production company: Wesley Ford Productions
- Distributed by: Mayfair Pictures
- Release date: September 1, 1933
- Running time: 65 minutes
- Country: United States
- Language: English

Her Forgotten Past is a 1933 American pre-Code mystery film directed by Wesley Ford and starring Monte Blue, Barbara Kent and Henry B. Walthall.

== Plot ==
Without telling her wealthy father, Doris Maynard marries the family chauffeur. When he finds out the couple leave together, but after a few months she discovers that her husband is a reckless gambler, who with a warrant out for his arrest goes on the run. Doris returns home and sometime later is courted by a district attorney, but on her father's advice declines to tell him about her recent marriage as it is believed her husband is now dead in an automobile accident.

== Cast ==
- Monte Blue as Donald Thorne
- Barbara Kent as Doris Maynard
- Henry B. Walthall as Mr. Maynard
- Eddie Phillips as Dan Simmons
- William V. Mong as Manners
- Dewey Robinson as Denman
- Ted Adams as Hickey
- Frank Ball as Billings
- Budd Buster as Police Detective
- Edmund Cobb as Bill
- Gordon De Main as Malone
- Earl Dwire as Henchman
- Kit Guard as 2nd Henchman, Poker-Player
- Henry Hall as Doctor
- James T. Mack as Minister
- William H. O'Brien as James
- Paddy O'Flynn as Police Detective Connors
- Stanley Price as Briggs
- Arthur Thalasso as Police Detective
- Wally West as Newspaper Reporter

== Bibliography ==
- Pitts, Michael R. Poverty Row Studios, 1929-1940. McFarland & Company, 2005.
