= Welcome Danger =

1929 film

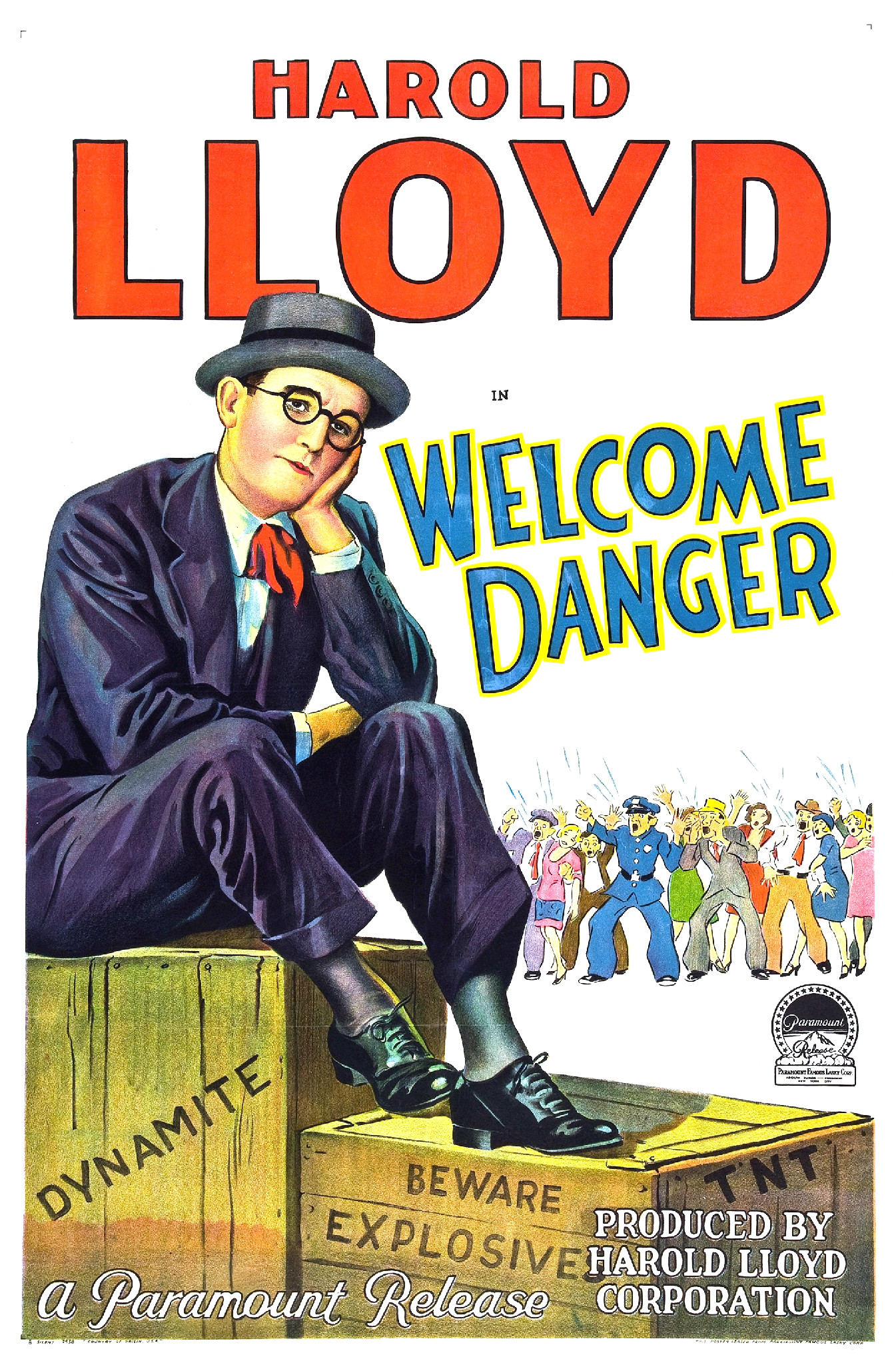
- Film poster
- Directed by: Clyde Bruckman; Malcolm St. Clair (uncredited)
- Written by: Paul Gerard Smith; Felix Adler; Lex Neal; Clyde Bruckman
- Starring: Harold Lloyd; Barbara Kent
- Cinematography: Henry O. Kohler; Walter Lundin
- Edited by: Bernard W. Burton; Carl Himm
- Production company: Harold Lloyd Corporation
- Distributed by: Paramount Pictures
- Release date: October 12, 1929
- Running time: 115 minutes (sound version); 165 minutes (silent version)
- Country: United States
- Language: English
- Budget: $979,828
- Box office: $3,000,000

Welcome Danger is a 1929 American pre-Code comedy film directed by Clyde Bruckman and starring Harold Lloyd. A sound version and silent version were filmed. Ted Wilde began work on the silent version, but became ill and was replaced by Bruckman. Wilde died from stroke two months after this film's premiere.

== Plot ==
Welcome Danger (1929)

Botany student Harold Bledsoe is bound for San Francisco to help investigate a crime wave in the city's "Chinatown" district. Since Harold is the son of San Francisco's former police captain, municipal authorities hope he will be as skilled as his father in solving crimes. Also traveling to the city, but by car, are a young woman named Billie Lee and her little brother Buddy, who needs his lame leg treated in San Francisco by "the famous Chinese physician" Dr. Chang Gow.

During a brief train stop in Colorado, Harold has his photograph taken at a vending machine. He is surprised to see a double-exposed print of himself and Billie Lee. He finally meets Billie when her car breaks down and she removes the carburetor. A motorist gives them some gasoline, but after he leaves, Billie realizes that she left the carburetor on the other car's running board. Now Harold and the Lees must spend the night along the roadside. Next morning, the trio harnesses a cow to pull their car to a gas station. Harold then catches another westbound train.

Once in San Francisco and at police headquarters, Harold is fascinated by fingerprinting, and takes prints of everyone at the building, including respected citizen John Thorne, who is pressuring the police to crack down on crime. The desk sergeant gets rid of Harold by assigning him to find the "Dragon," the mysterious master of the city's Chinese underworld. To "aid" Harold in his search, the sergeant gives him Thorne's fingerprint, but he lies and tells him it is the Dragon's print.

Harold goes to Chinatown and sees Billie, who gives him the address where she and Buddy are staying. Harold gets a potted flower for Billie. Dr. Gow, examining Buddy's leg, accidentally breaks the flowerpot, revealing a package of opium. The doctor goes to the flower shop, where he is kidnapped. Harold leaves to rescue the doctor.

In Chinatown, Harold and Clancy, a street cop he had met earlier, go to the flower shop. Aware of their presence, employees there set up a series of spooky effects to frighten them from the premises. Harold soon encounters the masked Dragon and some of his men preparing to execute Dr. Gow. Harold struggles with the Dragon, who escapes with his hostage before the police burst in and arrest everyone else.

Harold recognizes Thorne's fingerprint and denounces him, but the police think Thorne is above suspicion. They release Thorne and detain Harold. Harold gets away and follows Thorne to his home, where he eventually extracts a confession from him. The police arrive and remain skeptical until Harold finds Dr. Gow bound and gagged in a closet in Thorne's study. Thorne is arrested, and Billie accepts Harold's clumsy proposal of marriage.

== Cast of the sound version ==
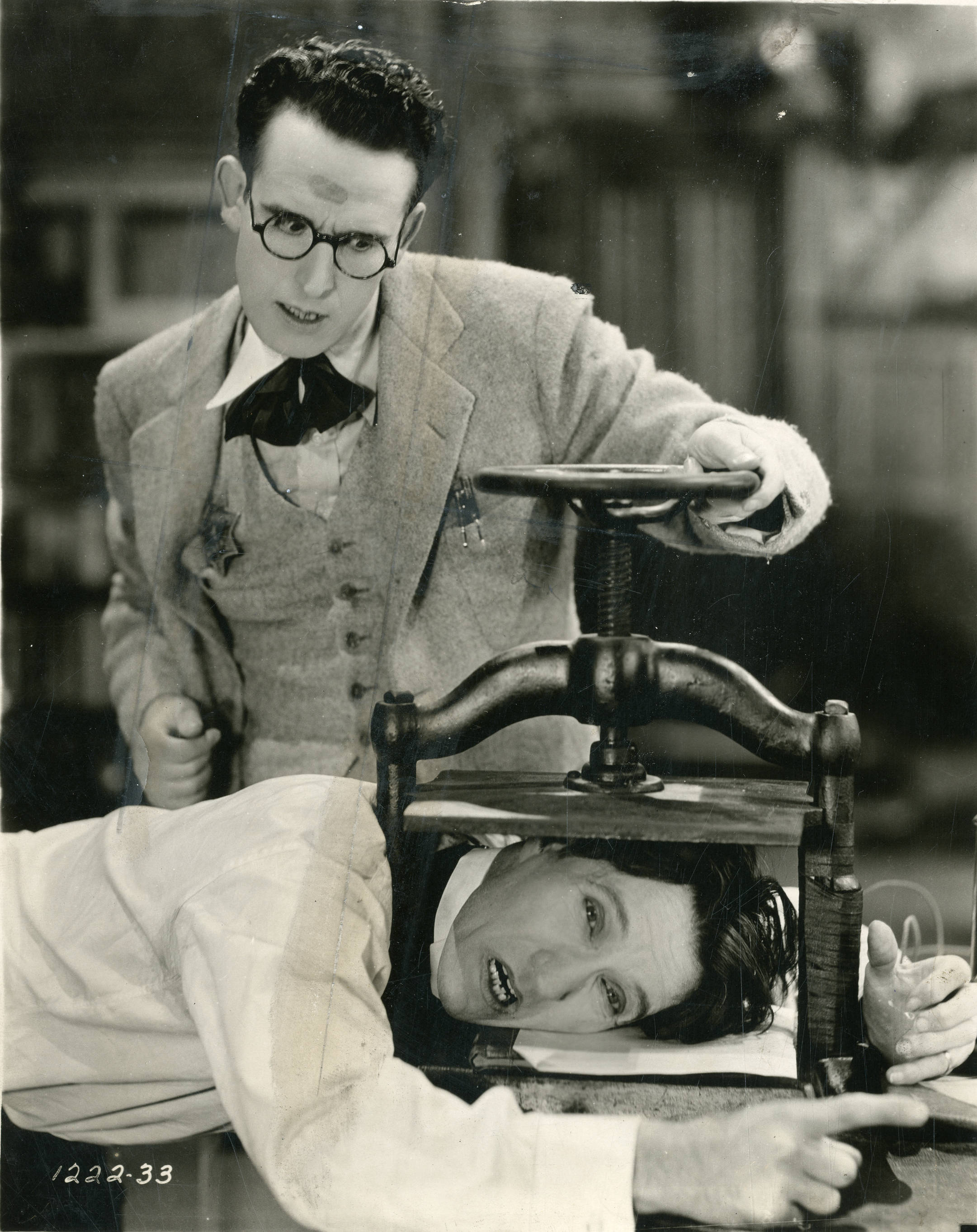
Lloyd and Middleton in a publicity shot from the film

- Harold Lloyd as- Harold Bledsoe
- Barbara Kent as Billie Lee
- Noah Young as Patrick Clancy
- Charles B. Middleton as John Thorne
- Will Walling as Captain Walton
- Edgar Kennedy as Police Desk Sergeant
- James Wang as Chang Gow
- Douglas Haig as Buddy Lee
- Blue Washington as Thorne's Henchman

== Premiere ==
In its October 3, 1929 issue, the popular New York-based trade paper The Film Daily covered the premiere of Welcome Danger.

Harold Lloyd is scheduled to arrive in New York [City] Monday to attend the world premiere of his latest Paramount release, "Welcome Danger," opening at the Rivoli Theater, October 12, according to telegraphic information received from Hollywood today.

Notably, the premiere took place two weeks prior to the Stock Market Crash of 1929.

== Harold Lloyd's first "talkie" ==
Lloyd had already completed Welcome Danger as a silent feature when his distributor, Paramount Pictures, was heavily promoting talking pictures. Lloyd decided to remake Welcome Danger with sound, going so far as to recast some of the supporting roles with stage-trained actors familiar with dialogue.

Moviegoers in the United States began to hear for the first time the voices of many of their favorite stars as Hollywood released more and more talking pictures in 1929. Many reviewers at that time, in addition to expressing their opinions about a movie's plot and production values, provided readers with their initial impressions after hearing an actor actually speak on screen. Since Welcome Danger was Harold Lloyd's first venture into the sound era, there was significant public interest in his voice. In October 1929, the influential New York entertainment publication Variety gave overall high marks to Welcome Danger and to Barbara Kent's spoken lines but offered a somewhat mixed review regarding Lloyd's recorded dialogue:

Harold Lloyd long held out against talkers, but if there is any doubt by exhibs [theater owners] that his first isn't a good Lloyd picture it should be dispelled immediately. Even talkers haven't stopped the begoggled comedian from bringing up a lot of new gags and working up situations as much as they can stand...Lloyd's voice is sometimes prone to weakness and even a consciousness of culture, but luckily for Lloyd and his customers this is mainly in the calmer scenes. When the big comedy sequences begin to build up and he goes hectic with his pantomime and slapstick his voice arises to the occasion and the audience will be likely to forget or overcome any disappointments over it in other spots...Recording is generally satisfactory, and Miss Kent is an attractive opposite to Lloyd. She photographs nicely and speaks distinctly.

Walter R. Greene, however, a reviewer for Motion Picture News in 1929, complimented Lloyd's stunts in Welcome Danger as well as the tone and general quality of the comedian's voice. "Harold Lloyd", Greene wrote, "has nothing to fear from talking pictures," adding "His voice registers excellently, and there is personality in its reproduction."

Paramount also offered the completed silent version to those theaters that had not yet converted to sound.

== Racism protest in China ==
On February 21, 1930, the first day of its release in China, the film sparked outrage among 35 viewers who, in their anger, wrote to Shanghai's Republican Daily News. They criticized the film for mocking the Chinese diaspora in America, depicting them in a deceitful and ugly manner, essentially humiliating and disgracing the Chinese people. The following day, the Chinese playwright and film director Hong Shen visited the Grand Cinema in Shanghai to watch the film. He left the theatre in protest when a scene showed Harold Lloyd throwing money on the ground to a Chinese flower seller. Before the next screening, Hong returned to the theatre to give a speech, condemning the film's offensive portrayal of Chinese people and urging the audience to boycott it. His call to action resonated with many, leading some to demand refunds. Upon learning of this, the theatre's general manager had Hong forcibly taken to his office and reported to the police. After being detained for about three hours, Hong was released. He immediately reported the incident to the Nationalist Party's Shanghai branch, calling for a ban on the film's screening.

== Preservation ==
Both the silent and sound versions have been restored by the UCLA Film and Television Archive.

This film was included in Optimum's region 2 'Harold Lloyd: The Definitive Collection' 2005 box set from the U.K., but was left out of the New Line region 1 'The Harold Lloyd Comedy Collection' 2005 box set from the U.S.

The film entered the public domain on January 1, 2025.

== See also ==
- Harold Lloyd filmography
- List of early sound feature films (1926–1929)
