= Self Defense (1932 film) =

1932 film

- Directed by: Phil Rosen
- Written by: Tristram Tupper
- Produced by: William T. Lackey; Trem Carr
- Starring: Pauline Frederick; Barbara Kent; Theodore von Eltz; Claire Windsor
- Cinematography: Archie Stout
- Distributed by: Monogram Pictures
- Release date: December 15, 1932
- Running time: 60 minutes
- Country: United States
- Language: English

Self Defense is a 1932 pre-Code American drama film directed by Phil Rosen and starring Pauline Frederick. It was produced and distributed by Monogram Pictures.

It is preserved in the Library of Congress film collection.

== Cast ==
- Pauline Frederick as Katy Devoux
- Theodore von Eltz as Tim Reed
- Barbara Kent as Nona Devoux
- Claire Windsor as Alice
- Robert Elliott as Dan Simmons
- Henry B. Walthall as Doctor Borden
- Jameson Thomas as Jeff Bowman
- Willie Fung as Charlie
- Lafe McKee as Sandy McKenzie
- Si Jenks as Farmer
- George "Gabby" Hayes as Jury foreman
