= Twice Two =

1933 short film by James Parrott

- Directed by: James Parrott
- Produced by: Hal Roach
- Starring: Stan Laurel; Oliver Hardy; Charlie Hall
- Cinematography: Art Lloyd
- Edited by: Bert Jordan
- Production company: Hal Roach Studios
- Distributed by: Metro-Goldwyn-Mayer
- Release date: February 25, 1933
- Running time: 20:27
- Country: United States
- Language: English

Twice Two is a 1933 American pre-Code Laurel and Hardy short film.

== Plot ==
It is the first wedding anniversary of Stan, who wed Oliver's sister Fannie, and Oliver, who wed Stan's sister "Sis". This matrimonial arrangement leads to the cohabitation of the two couples under one roof, with Stan and Oliver both working in the same office.

Amidst the domestic setting, the narrative unfolds with a series of incidents, including telephone gags and preparations for a surprise anniversary party organized by the wives to celebrate their first year of marriage. However, the celebratory mood takes a comical turn when a cake mishap results in Mrs. Laurel bearing an inadvertent resemblance to Queen Elizabeth I, depicted in a portrait on the dining room wall.

As Stan and Oliver arrive at the party, tensions and squabbles ensue between the two couples, punctuating the atmosphere of the celebration. The climax of the film occurs with the arrival of a delivery boy bearing yet another cake. This moment culminates in a chaotic scene where Mrs. Laurel is doused with the cake by a disgruntled Mrs. Hardy.

== Cast ==
Credited:

- Stan Laurel as Mr. Stan Laurel / Mrs. "Sis" Hardy
  - Carol Tevis as Mrs. "Sis" Hardy (voice)
- Oliver Hardy as Mr. Oliver Hardy / Mrs. Fannie Laurel
  - May Wallace as Mrs. Fannie Laurel (voice)

Uncredited:

- Baldwin Cooke as Soda Jerk
- Charlie Hall as Delivery Boy
- Ham Kinsey as Passerby

== Production notes ==
Laurel and Hardy portray dual roles in Twice Two, a theme echoed in two other films: Brats and Our Relations. The voices of Mrs. Hardy and Mrs. Laurel are dubbed by Carol Tevis and May Wallace.

Twice Two is the second occasion where Stan Laurel adopts drag to portray Oliver Hardy's spouse, a role he had previously undertaken in That's My Wife. Stan's adeptness in such roles is evidenced by his portrayals in Another Fine Mess, A Chump at Oxford, and Jitterbugs.

The production is the last Laurel & Hardy film directed by James Parrott.
