= Roaring Lions at Home =

1924 American silent short film

- Directed by: Benjamin Stoloff
- Starring: Oliver Hardy
- Cinematography: Sidney Wagner
- Production company: Fox Film
- Release date: November 23, 1924
- Country: United States
- Language: Silent

Roaring Lions at Home is a 1924 short comedy film directed by American director Benjamin Stoloff. It was released by Fox Film and starred Oliver Hardy.
