= Obey the Law (1933 film) =

1933 film by Benjamin Stoloff

- Directed by: Benjamin Stoloff
- Written by: Arthur Caesar
- Based on: East of Fifth Avenue story idea by Harry Sauber
- Produced by: Bryan Foy
- Starring: Leo Carrillo; Lois Wilson; Dickie Moore
- Distributed by: Columbia Pictures
- Release date: March 11, 1933
- Running time: 64 minutes
- Country: United States
- Language: English

Obey the Law is a 1933 American Pre-Code crime drama film released by Columbia Pictures.

== Plot ==
A good-hearted and patriotic Italian immigrant barber Tony Pasqual (Leo Carrillo) who takes pity on embittered war veteran Bob Richards (Eddie Garr). When Richards robs him, Pasqual responds by helping Richards find a job. Richards dies while trying to rescue young Dickie Chester (Dickie Moore) from illicit gambling, and Pasqual takes in Chester and his mother (Lois Wilson). Big Joe Reardon (Henry Clive) is unsuccessful in using public displays of charitable good deeds to fool Pasqual into believing that he's not the neighborhood crime boss, so he has the barber shop destroyed. Pasqual gets Reardon apprehended by the police by telling his story on radio.

== Cast ==
- Leo Carrillo as Tony Pasqual
- Dickie Moore as Dickie Chester
- Lois Wilson as Grace Chester
- Eddie Garr as Bob Richards
- Gino Corrado as Giovanni
- Ward Bond as Kid Paris
- Henry Clive as Big Joe Reardon
