= Our Relations =

1936 film by Harry Lachman

- Theatrical release poster
- Directed by: Harry Lachman
- Written by: Felix Adler; Richard Connell
- Based on: The Money Box; 1931 short story by William Wymark Jacobs
- Produced by: Stan Laurel; Hal Roach
- Starring: Stan Laurel; Oliver Hardy
- Cinematography: Rudolph Maté
- Edited by: Bert Jordan
- Music by: Leroy Shield
- Production company: Hal Roach Studios
- Distributed by: Metro-Goldwyn-Mayer
- Release date: October 30, 1936
- Running time: 1:10:44
- Country: United States
- Language: English
- Budget: $400,000

Our Relations is a 1936 American comedy film directed by Harry Lachman starring Laurel and Hardy, produced by Stan Laurel for Hal Roach Studios.

== Plot ==
Stan and Ollie are unexpectedly reunited with their long-lost twin brothers, Alf and Bert, whose presumed demise is debunked by a photograph enclosed in a letter. Alf and Bert, presently sailors aboard the SS Periwinkle, dock in the same harbor as Stan and Ollie's residence, accompanied by their wives, Daphne and Betty.

Aboard the ship, Alf and Bert encounter Finn, the chief engineer, who tempts them with the prospect of wealth accumulation. Entrusting their earnings to Finn for safekeeping, they inadvertently become entangled in a web of deceit when Finn refuses to return their wages. Matters escalate as they unwittingly pawn a valuable ring entrusted to them by the ship's captain, exacerbating their financial predicament.

Meanwhile, Stan and Ollie, joined by their wives, find themselves embroiled in a series of misunderstandings stemming from Alf and Bert's impulsive actions. Unwittingly shouldering the consequences of Alf and Bert's debts, Stan and Ollie are ensnared in a violent encounter with Finn, culminating in threats of revenge.

As the chaos unfolds, Alf and Bert's misadventures lead to their arrest, while Stan and Ollie fall victim to mafia extortionists seeking the missing ring. Amidst the ensuing turmoil, the twin pairs converge at the waterfront, where a fortuitous discovery of the ring and a spirited altercation result in their collective immersion into the water.

The twins eventually reconcile and resolve to elucidate the misunderstanding to their respective spouses. However, their lack of foresight precipitates further mishaps, culminating in a plunge into the water.

== Cast ==
=== Credited ===
- Stan Laurel as Stan/Alf Laurel
- Oliver Hardy as Ollie/Bert Hardy
- Alan Hale as Joe Grogan, innkeeper
- Sidney Toler as Captain of SS Periwinkle
- Daphne Pollard as Mrs. Daphne Hardy
- Betty Brown as Mrs. Betty Laurel (as Betty Healy)
- James Finlayson as Finn
- Iris Adrian as Alice
- Lona Andre as Lily
- Ralf Harolde as the Gangster boss
- Noel Madison as the Second gangster
- Arthur Housman as the Drunk

=== Uncredited ===
- Dell Henderson as the Night Court Judge
- James C. Morton as Grogan's barkeeper
- Harry Bernard as the confused policeman

== Production ==
Our Relations is the third of three films in which they both play a dual role: the first was Brats (1930) and the second was Twice Two (1933). The story is based on the short story "The Money Box" by W.W. Jacobs, author of "The Monkey's Paw" (1902). However, "The Money Box" does not involve any twins. The film's central idea of two sets of twins being confused for each other was most famously used in Shakespeare's The Comedy of Errors (c. 1592).

A departure from the traditional Laurel and Hardy archetype is observed in Our Relations, as Stan and Ollie assume the roles of upstanding individuals, each with a spouse and stable employment, a departure from their typical portrayal as hapless yet endearing characters struggling to make ends meet. Conversely, it is their maritime counterparts, Alf Laurel and Bert Hardy, who epitomize ineptitude and incompetence as sailors aboard the vessel S.S Periwinkle.

While aboard the ship, Alf and Bert don seafaring attire, reflecting their occupation. Upon disembarking, they adopt civilian attire, complete with iconic derby hats, rendering them nearly indistinguishable from their brothers. Notably, a reversal in sartorial conventions is observed, with Alf adorned in the customary attire while Bert opts for a bowtie, a stark contrast to Stan and Ollie's respective attire. Furthermore, musical cues serve as a distinguishing feature between the twin pairs, with Laurel and Hardy's signature theme, "Dance of the Cuckoos", accompanying the appearances of Stan and Ollie, while melodies such as "Sailing, Sailing over the Bounding Main" or the "Sailor's Hornpipe" signal the presence of Alf and Bert on screen.

The film is distinguished by the camera work of successful dramatic cinematographer Rudolph Maté (The Passion of Joan of Arc, 1928). The film was based on the story The Money Box by W.W. Jacobs. The story was adapted by Jack Jevne and Charley Rogers and the film written by Felix Adler and Richard Connell.

== Reception ==
Leonard Maltin gave it three of four stars: "Stan and Ollie get into snowballing comedy of errors with their long-lost twins. Lots of fun; best scenes in Hale's beer garden." Leslie Halliwell was enthusiastic: "A fast-moving comedy which contains some of Laurel and Hardy's most polished work as well as being their most satisfying production."

== Legacy ==
In 2000, the Dutch revivalist orchestra The Beau Hunks collaborated with the Metropole Orchestra to re-create composer Leroy Shield's soundtrack to Our Relations from original sheet music that had been discovered in a Los Angeles archive in 1994 and 1995.
