= Hook and Ladder (1932 film) =

1932 Our Gang short film

- Directed by: Robert F. McGowan
- Written by: Robert A. McGowan; Hal Roach; H. M. Walker
- Produced by: Robert F. McGowan; Hal Roach
- Cinematography: Hap Depew
- Edited by: Richard C. Currier
- Music by: Leroy Shield; Marvin Hatley
- Distributed by: MGM
- Release date: August 27, 1932
- Running time: 18 minutes
- Country: United States
- Language: English

Hook and Ladder is a 1932 Our Gang short comedy film directed by Robert F. McGowan. It was the 116th Our Gang short to be released.

== Synopsis ==
Answering the Fire Chief's request for volunteers, the Our Gang kids form their own firefighting squadron, replete with ersatz uniforms, a fire pole, a dog-and-cat-powered alarm, and a jerry-built fire engine that must be seen to be believed. After a few false alarms and delays, the kids are afforded the opportunity to put out a real fire, which they do with the expertise of veteran smoke-eaters.

== Cast ==
=== The Gang ===
- Sherwood Bailey as Spud
- Matthew Beard as Stymie
- Dorothy DeBorba as Dorothy
- Kendall McComas as Breezy
- George McFarland as Spanky
- Dickie Moore as Dickie
- Buddy McDonald as Speck
- Harold Wertz as Bouncy
- Pete the Pup as himself
- Laughing Gravy as Dog in Dickie's car

=== Additional cast ===
- Gene Morgan as Fireman
- Don Sandstrom as Fire hazard bit

== Notes and critique ==
Hook and Ladder is a remake of the 1926 Our Gang comedy The Fourth Alarm; hand made carts the "Our Gang" kids ride on in this film are exactly the same ones used in The Fourth Alarm. Gags from the 1922 "Our Gang" comedy Fire Fighters are also re-used. An amusing running gag involving Spanky McFarland's worm medicine punctuates this lively series entry.

Hook and Ladder employed the usual jazz based scoring about two thirds of the time. One third of the time the film reverted to an orchestral music scoring with several tunes from the 1930 Our Gang film When The Wind Blows. Most of the orchestral scoring was employed during the scenes where the gang was fighting a real fire.

This marked Dickie Moore's first appearance. He would be a lead character but would only remain for a season. This was also Sherwood Bailey's and Buddy McDonald's last appearances on the series.

It is also the final time an Our Gang title card says: 'Our Gang' Comedies: Hal Roach presents His Rascals in...

== See also ==
- Our Gang filmography
