= Leo Willis =

American actor

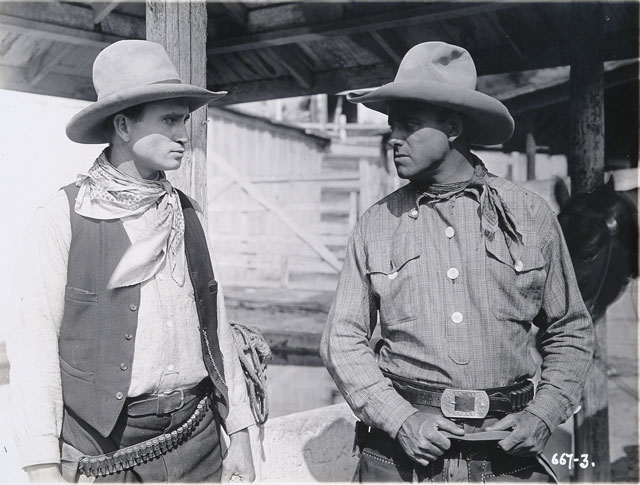
- Still with Leo Willis and Roy Stewart in The Silent Rider (1918)
- Born: January 5, 1890; Wapanucka, Oklahoma, US
- Died: 10 April 1952 (aged 62); King City, California, US
- Occupation: Actor
- Years active: 1914–1936
- Spouse(s): May Frances Hennessy (m. 1914; died 1927)
- Children: 2 daughters

Leo Willis (January 5, 1890 – April 10, 1952) was an American actor who began his career in the silent era. He played mainly tough guys and comic villains, notably opposite Harold Lloyd, Charley Chase, and Laurel and Hardy at the Hal Roach Studios.

== Early life and career ==
Born in Wapanucka, Oklahoma, Willis was the son of Joe Willis and Margurate Holdebery.

Regarding Willis's third film, the 1916 William S. Hart western The Return of Draw Egan, the Nashville Tennessean singled out as one of the film's principal "thrill[s]" a fight staged between the star and Willis, whom the paper dubs "one of Inceville's strongest men." Willis again figured prominently, this time alongside fellow villain Thomas Kurihara, in Hart's followup western, The Devil's Double.

Leo Willis in The Kid Brother (1927)

The Philadelphia Inquirer, in its contemporaneous review of Harold Lloyd's 1927 comedy The Kid Brother, states that Walter James, Willis, and Olin Francis, in their respective portrayals of the hero's father and two older brothers, "create a new standard of character work in a feature-length comedy," a point echoed by New-York Tribune critic Harriette Underhill, who characterized the trio's work as "singularly earnest [and] without exaggeration for a work of this sort."

Beginning in 1927, the final decade of Willis's screen career featured appearances—mostly in minor roles—in 11 films alongside Laurel and Hardy, including a pair, Call of the Cuckoo and Flying Elephants, in which the two appeared together prior to becoming a full-fledged team, as well as his final role, in the 1936 Charlie Chase short, On the Wrong Trek, in which the famous team makes only a cameo appearance.

== Personal life and death ==
Willis was married to May Frances Hennessey from June 1914 until her death on September 17, 1926. They had two daughters.

On April 10, 1952, at age 62, Willis died in his sleep at his home in King City, California.

== Selected filmography ==
- The Italian (1915)
- Hell's Hinges (1915)
- The Return of Draw Egan (1916)
- The Devil's Double (1916)
- One Shot Ross (1917)
- Bull's Eye (1917)
- A Regular Fellow (1919)
- The Toll Gate (1920)
- The Rent Collector (1921)
- Three Word Brand (1921)
- The Timber Queen (1922)
- Broken Chains (1922)
- Wild Bill Hickok (1923)
- Near Dublin (1924)
- Jubilo, Jr. (1924)
- Short Kilts (1924)
- The White Sheep (1924)
- Isn't Life Terrible? (1925)
- A Hero of the Big Snows (1926)
- The Tough Guy (1926)
- The Kid Brother (1927)
- Call of the Cuckoo (1927)
- Flying Elephants (1928)
- Their Purple Moment (1928)
- The Hoose-Gow (1929)
- Below Zero (1930)
- Pardon Us (1931)
- The Kid from Spain (1932)
- The Live Ghost (1934)
- The Gold Ghost (1934)
- The Bohemian Girl (1936)
