= Martha Sleeper =

American actress

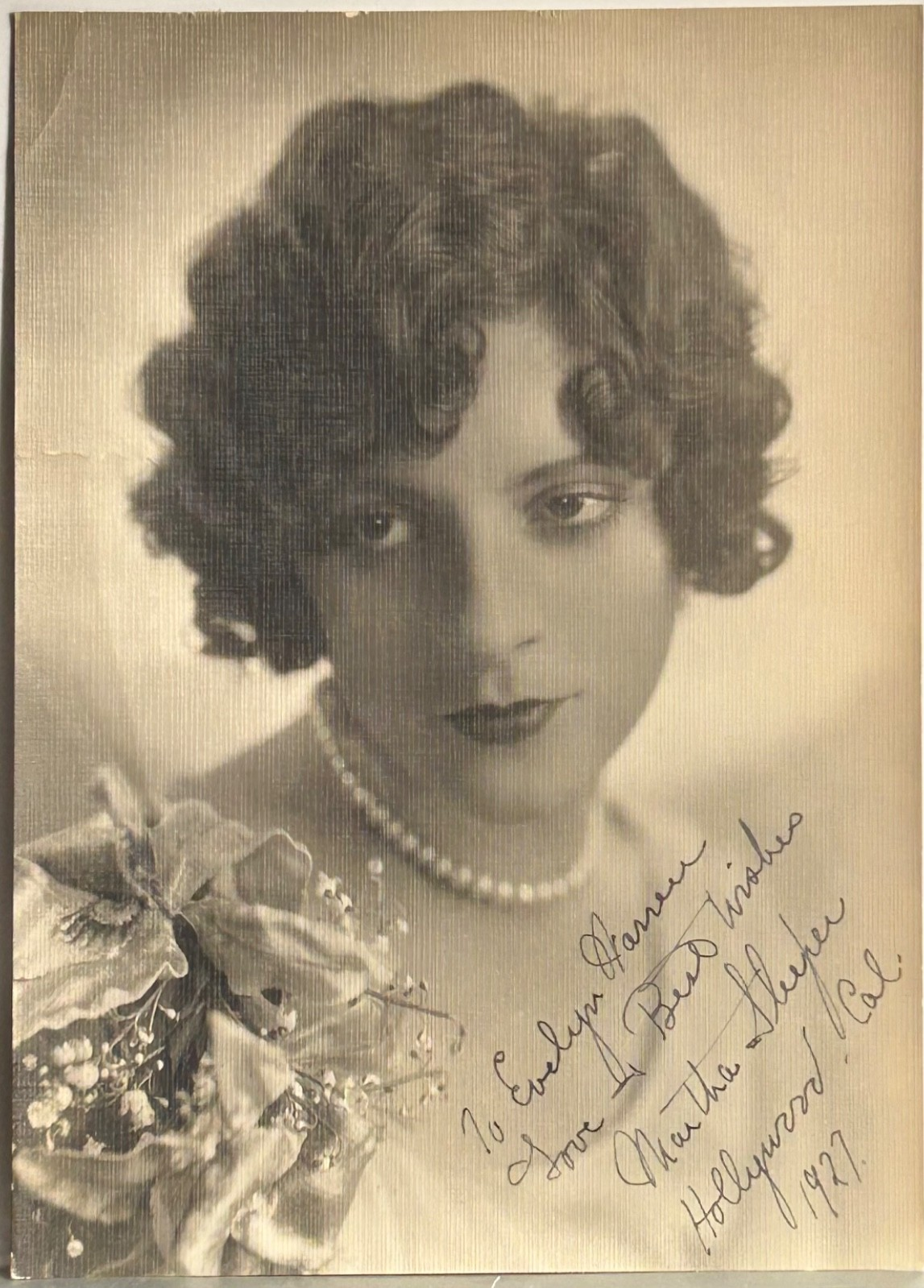
- Signed Photo (1927)
- Born: June 24, 1910; Lake Bluff, Illinois, U.S.
- Died: March 25, 1983 (aged 72); Beaufort, South Carolina, U.S.
- Occupations: Actress; businesswoman
- Years active: 1923–1945 (Acting)
- Spouses: Hardie Albright (m. 1934; div. 1940) Harry Deutschbein (m. 1944, divorced) Col. Howard C. Stelling (m. 1969)

Martha Sleeper (June 24, 1910 – March 25, 1983) was a film actress of the 1920s and 1930s and, later, a Broadway stage actress. She studied dancing for five years with Russian ballet master, Louis H. Chalif, at his New York dancing studio. Her first public exhibitions were at Carnegie Hall at his class exhibitions.

== Family ==
Sleeper reputedly spent her first years on a sheep ranch in Wyoming. Her father, William B. Sleeper, was an official of the Keith-Albee-Orpheum vaudeville circuit in New York City. Her uncle was John J. Murdock, head of KAO and one of the most powerful men in the business. He had a major impact on her career. Her mother was Minnie Akass.

Her father retired to Los Angeles, California, in 1923 due to ill health. Martha was under contract to Hal Roach studios beginning in 1924, when she was 14 years old. Her father was found dead of heart disease on September 1, 1925, in bed at his home. Sleeper, then 15 years old, with her mother and sister, were away, having taken a short trip to New York City.

== Acting career ==
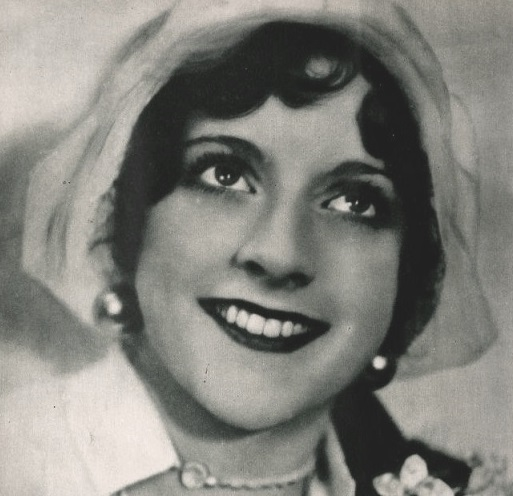
Martha Sleeper in 1928

Sleeper's film career began in 1923 and continued until 1945. Her first screen appearance, at the age of 12, was in The Mailman (1923), an independent production. After appearing in several kiddie comedies at the Christie studio she was signed by the Hal Roach studio for the Our Gang series but she quickly outgrew that role, leaving it shortly after her 14th birthday.

From 1925 to 1927 she appeared in comedies playing opposite the studio's most popular male stars. She developed into a very inventive comedienne, with an animated face of many comic expressions—especially in the Charley Chase short The Rat's Knuckles (Martha's a waitress, registering confusion when a customer pours an entire bottle of soda on his sandwich) and in the Max Davidson short Pass the Gravy (Martha, imitating a chicken, thinks she has laid an egg). Many of her early comedies were directed by Leo McCarey.

In 1927, Sleeper was one of 13 actresses selected as a WAMPAS Baby Star, whom exhibitors thought had a promising future in feature films. Late that year she left the Roach studios—which made only short-subject comedies—and signed with the FBO studio. FBO introduced Sleeper and Bryant Washburn as a new comedy team. In 1928-29 she starred in six silent features. With the coming of sound she was signed by MGM and placed in their training program.

From 1930 to 1936 she played many supporting roles in melodramas, her role typically that of a well-bred and somewhat snobbish society woman who loses her man to the film's leading lady. Frustrated by the types of roles she was being offered, Sleeper began playing in local stage productions, at one point drawing raves as Eliza Doolittle in a performance of Pygmalion in 1932.

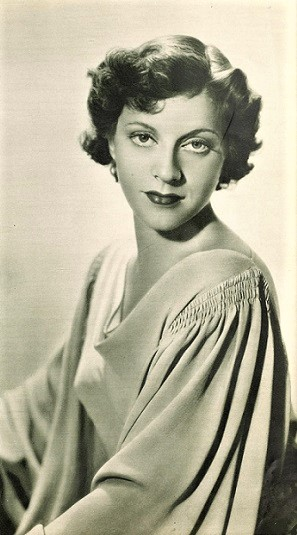
Martha Sleeper in 1935)

After appearing in some low-budget melodramas for Monogram studio, Sleeper and her husband, actor Hardie Albright, left Hollywood for New York in 1936 where Sleeper began a long run in both on- and off-Broadway plays. Her first Broadway play was Good Men and True (1934).

In 1944 she spent a summer in the stock cast at Elitch Theatre with Raymond Burr as the Leading Man. "Martha Sleeper was the leading lady and made her debut at Elitch in the 1944 season in Frederick Lonsdale's Another Love Story. She was encouraged to begin an acting career by Cecil B. De Mille. At the age of 13 Martha was consumed with the desire to become a film actress. Her parents were acquainted with Cecil B. De Mille and sent her to him in hopes that he would dissuade her from her childish ambition. But De Mille was impressed with the youngster's enthusiasm and believed she possessed talent. De Mille encouraged her to pursue work in Mack Sennett or Hal Roach comedies, which he considered the best school for beginners to learn timing and the ground work for a higher dramatic career." Aware of the pie-throwing antics of the Sennett studio, Martha chose to settle for a part with the Hal Roach comedy shorts.

In 1945, as a favor to her Hal Roach director Leo McCarey, Sleeper played the role of Patsy's mother in The Bells of St. Mary's. It was her last screen role. In 1945, after appearing in The Bells of St, Mary's, Martha returned to New York and played Spencer Tracy's wife in the Broadway play The Rugged Path.

== Business career ==
While In New York, she turned a hobby into a thriving business, finding herself at the forefront of a fashion craze for "gadget jewelry" in the late 1930s. She had designed and manufactured whimsical pieces of costume jewelry for herself, but soon other women saw these pieces and wanted to know where they could obtain a copy. Martha found a company that would manufacture her designs, and they soon became available in department stores around the country, generating Martha a substantial sideline income in addition to her stage work. Many of these pieces were manufactured using Bakelite; these pieces are now considered valuable collectibles.

In 1949, she and her second husband were on an extended cruise in the Caribbean. Her destination was the Virgin Islands and a vacation with her husband; however, when she reached Puerto Rico, she fell in love with the island. Terminating the cruise, Martha and her husband took up permanent residence in San Juan. Looking for a new challenge, and no longer interested in jewelry design, she reinvented herself and began designing women's clothing and resort wear. She had her designs manufactured locally and sold them through a boutique that she established in a 300-year-old building in Old Town San Juan. She won many awards and commissions from large corporations for unique designs. She operated this business from 1950 until her retirement in 1969. In 1969, she married her third husband and left San Juan for Beaufort, South Carolina, where she spent her remaining years.

== Death ==
Sleeper died of a heart attack, aged 72, in Beaufort, South Carolina, where she had lived with her third husband, Col. Howard C. Stelling, who survived her. She had no children.

== Former discrepancies regarding Martha Sleeper's year of birth ==
Many sources had cited 1907 as Sleeper's year of birth, but she was actually born shortly after the 1910 census was taken in April 1910. Martha's true date of birth is June 24, 1910, as verified by a copy of her birth certificate.

No "Martha Sleeper" appears in the 1910 census records; however, a "Martha Sleeper" is listed as 9 years old in the 1920 census (April 1920) and 19 years old in the 1930 census (April 1930). An airline passenger list, flight CBA 611 from St. Maarten to Charlotte Amalie, VI, on 10 Sep 1962, gives a birthdate of 6-24-1910, in Illinois (ancestry.com). A U.K. Incoming Passenger list (ancestry.com) for the RMS Queen Elizabeth, from New York to Southamptom, arriving 19 Aug 1958, gives a birthdate of 24.6.10. The Social Security Death Index records the date of birth of a "Martha Stelling" (Sleeper's third husband's surname) who died in March 1983 in Beaufort County, South Carolina, as June 24, 1910. Sleeper's 1983 New York Times obituary, as well, was titled "Martha Sleeper Is Dead At 72."

== Filmography ==
Year	Film	Role	Notes
1923	The Mailman	Betty	
1924	The Racing Kid		Short
1924	Trailing Trouble		Short
1924	Please, Teacher!		Short
1924	A Ten-Minute Egg	Mrs. Dugan	Short
1924	Seeing Nellie Home		Short
1924	Sweet Daddy	Daughter	Short
1924	Outdoor Pajamas	Girl with Runaway Pony	Short
1924	Low Bridge	Martha - Buddy's Sweetheart	Short
1924	Should Landlords Live?		Short
1924	Too Many Mammas	The Apache Dancer	Short
1924	Every Man for Himself	Lady with rings around her eyes	Short
1924	All Wet		Uncredited
1924	The Royal Razz		Short
1925	The Rat's Knuckles	Flirty McFickle	Short
1925	Plain and Fancy Girls		Short
1925	Bad Boy	Jimmie's Girl Friend	Short
1925	Are Husbands Necessary?		Short
1925	Big Red Riding Hood	The Maid, Book Store Clerk	Short
1925	Wild Papa		Short, Uncredited
1925	Sure-Mike!	Vermuda	Short
1925	Sherlock Sleuth	Hotel Operator	Short
1925	Innocent Husbands	Girl at Party	Short, Uncredited
1925	Tame Men and Wild Women		Short
1925	There Goes the Bride		Short
1925	Better Movies	Teenaged 'Vamp'	Short
1925	Should Sailors Marry?	Smyrna	Short
1925	Laughing Ladies		Short
1925	Hold Everything		Short
1926	A Punch in the Nose		Short
1926	What's the World Coming To?	Butler	Short
1926	Your Husband's Past		Short
1926	Madame Mystery		Short
1926	Dizzy Daddies	Minor Role	Short, Uncredited
1926	Ukulele Sheiks		Short
1926	Baby Clothes	Leggy Lady	Short
1926	Mum's the Word	The Nervous Little Girl	Short, Uncredited
1926	Say It with Babies	Hector's Wife	Short
1926	Don Key (Son of Burro)	Maid	Short
1926	Long Fliv the King	Princess Helga of Thermosa	Short
1926	Never Too Old		Short
1926	Thundering Fleas	Bride	Short
1926	Along Came Auntie	Marie, the Maid	Short
1926	The Merry Widower		Short; Unconfirmed
1926	Crazy Like a Fox	The Bride	Short
1926	Should Husbands Pay?	His Wife	Short
1926	Bromo and Juliet	Bit Role	Short, Uncredited
1926	Wise Guys Prefer Brunettes	Co-ed	Short, Uncredited
1927	The Honorable Mr. Buggs	The Fiancée	Short
1927	Jewish Prudence	Rachel Gimplewart	Short
1927	Fluttering Hearts	Daughter	Short
1927	The Way of All Pants		Short, Uncredited; Unconfirmed
1927	Love 'Em and Feed 'Em	Martha, a stenographer	Short
1927	Fighting Fathers		Short
1927	Flaming Fathers	Daughter	Short
1928	Pass the Gravy	Daughter	Short
1928	Should Tall Men Marry?	Martha Skittle	Short
1928	Skinner's Big Idea	Dorothy	
1928	The Little Yellow House	Emmy Milburn	
1928	Danger Street	Kitty	
1928	Taxi 13	Flora Mactavish	
1929	The Air Legion	Sally	
1929	The Voice of the Storm	Ruth	
1930	Our Blushing Brides	Evelyn Woodforth	
1930	Madam Satan	Fish Girl	
1930	War Nurse	Helen	
1931	Girls Demand Excitement	Harriet Mundy	
1931	Ten Cents a Dance	Nancy Clark	
1931	A Tailor Made Man	Corrine	
1931	Confessions of a Co-Ed	Lucille	
1932	Huddle	Barbara Winston	
1932	The Chimp	Landlord's wife Ethel	Uncredited
1932	Rasputin and the Empress	Party Girl	Uncredited
1933	The Secret of Madame Blanche	Chorus Girl Who Hears 'My Country Tis of Thee'	Uncredited
1933	Midnight Mary	Barbara Loring Mannering	
1933	Penthouse	Sue Leonard	
1933	Bombshell	Lola's Hair Stylist	Uncredited
1933	Broken Dreams	Martha Morley	
1934	Spitfire	Eleanor Stafford	
1934	Hollywood Party	Show Girl	Uncredited
1934	Tomorrow's Youth	Mrs. Hall	
1934	West of the Pecos	Ril Lambeth	
1935	Great God Gold	Marcia Harper	
1935	The Scoundrel	Julia Vivian	
1935	Two Sinners	Elsie Summerstone	
1936	Rhythm on the Range	Constance Hyde	
1936	Four Days' Wonder	Nancy Fairbrother	
1945	The Bells of St. Mary's	Mary Gallagher, Patsy's mother	(final film role)
