= Viola Richard =

American actress (1904–1973)

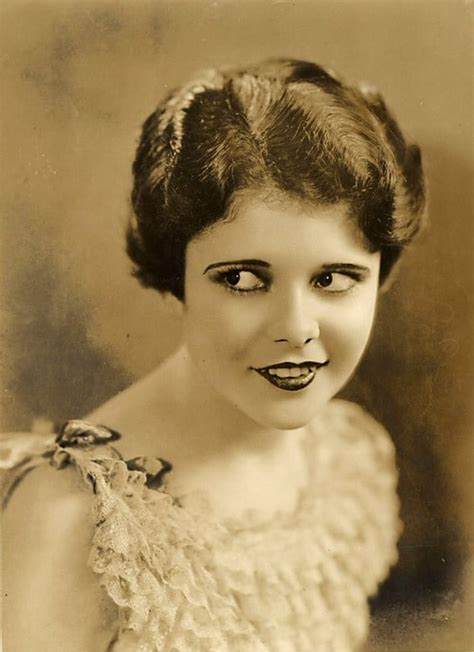
- Viola Richard circa 1925
- Born: January 26, 1904
- Died: December 28, 1973 (aged 69); Riverside, California
- Occupation: Actress
- Years active: 1926–1935
- Spouses: Alexander Kempner (m. 1928; div. 1938) Sydney Rusinow (m. 1942; died 1951) Lawrence McCafferty (m. 1953)

Viola Richard (January 26, 1904 – December 28, 1973 ) was an American actress.

== Biography ==
Richard worked at the Hal Roach Studios, where she had a five-year contract, opposite Laurel and Hardy, Charley Chase, and Max Davidson in the 1920s. She left Roach in 1928, but returned in 1935 to play small roles in an Our Gang short and again with Laurel and Hardy in Tit for Tat.

Richard was married three times. Her first marriage, to Alexander Kempner in 1928, ended in divorce in 1938. She married Sydney Rusinow in 1942, but he died in a house fire in 1951. In 1953 she married Lawrence McCafferty, and they remained married until her death; he died in 1979.

Richard died in 1973 in Riverside, California.

She is not to be confused with Viola Agnes Richard (1901–1955) of 20th Century Fox Films' wardrobe department.

== Partial filmography ==
Year	Title	Role	Notes
1926	Exclusive Rights		
1927	Why Girls Love Sailors	Willie's Girl	Short
1927	Sailors, Beware!	Society lady	Short, Uncredited
1927	Love 'Em and Feed 'Em	Viola, a telephone operator	Short
1927	Do Detectives Think?	Mrs. Foozle	Short, Uncredited
1928	Leave 'Em Laughing	Dentist's Nurse	Short, Uncredited
1928	Flying Elephants	Blushing Rose	Short
1928	Limousine Love	Mrs. Glenders	Short
1928	Should Married Men Go Home?	Brunette Girlfriend	Short, Uncredited
1935	Tit for Tat	Passerby	Short, Uncredited
1935	Sprucin' Up	Second pedestrian	Short, (final film role)
