= Do Detectives Think? =

1927 film

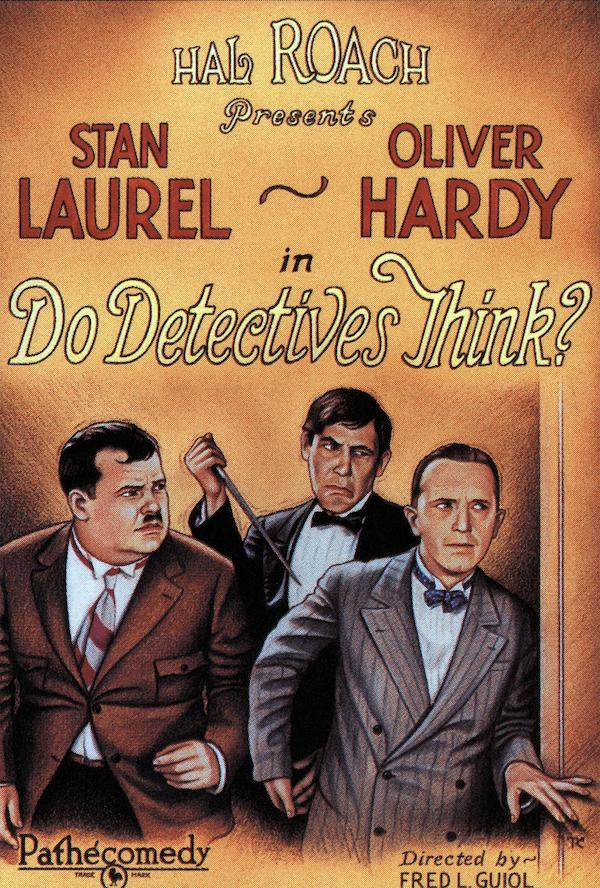
- Theatrical release poster
- Directed by: Fred Guiol
- Written by: Hal Roach; H.M. Walker (titles)
- Produced by: Hal Roach
- Starring: Stan Laurel; Oliver Hardy
- Distributed by: Pathé Exchange
- Release date: November 20, 1927
- Running time: 19 minutes
- Country: United States
- Languages: Silent film English intertitles

Full film

Do Detectives Think? or The Bodyguard is a 1927 silent comedy short film starring Stan Laurel and Oliver Hardy prior to their official billing as the duo Laurel and Hardy.

== Plot ==
A judge sentences a dangerous criminal, the Tipton Slasher, to death "for killing two Chinamen, both seriously". When Judge Foozle, in pronouncing sentence, rather gratuitously adds "And I hope you choke!", the enraged Slasher vows to cut out the Judge's tonsils. The Slasher's subsequent escape prompts the judge to hire Laurel and Hardy, two clumsy detectives, for protection. The mishaps Laurel and Hardy face while on duty include losing their hats in a cemetery and being repeatedly frightened by their own shadows. Meanwhile, the Slasher gains entry to the judge's house by disguising himself as a butler.

Hardy tries to impress the judge with his shooting skills but misses his target and destroys a sculpture. After Laurel and Hardy retire to bed, the judge's wife sees the Slasher stalking the house while brandishing a large knife and screams in alarm. Laurel and Hardy spring into action and, after much blundering, capture the Slasher. Their triumph is short-lived, however, as Laurel accidentally puts handcuffs on Hardy instead of on the Slasher, who promptly resumes terrorizing them with his knife. Ultimately, the Slasher is captured after mistaking the judge – wrapped in a sheet after emerging from a bath – for a ghost. Paralyzed with fear, the Slasher is easily subdued and turned over to the police, thanks to Laurel and Hardy's help.

== Cast ==
- Stan Laurel - Ferdinand Finkleberry
- Oliver Hardy - Sherlock Pinkham
- James Finlayson - Judge Foozle
- Noah Young - The Tipton Slasher
- Viola Richard - Mrs. Foozle
- Frank Brownlee - Detective agency boss
- Charles A. Bachman - Officer
- Will Stanton - Slasher's pal
- Charley Young - Juror
- Wilson Benge - Butler attacked by Slasher
- Ed Brandenburg - Courtroom spectator
- Charles Lloyd - Juror

== Production notes ==
Do Detectives Think? is the first film to showcase Laurel and Hardy donning their iconic attire of crumpled suits and bowler hats, the typical outfit of detectives during that era.

It was later reworked into the sound short Going Bye-Bye! (1934), and the team's last American film The Bullfighters (1945), made at 20th Century Fox.

== Homages ==
Canadian musician Nash the Slash chose his stage name based on the character in Do Detectives Think.
