= Archie Marshek =

American film editor

- Born: February 15, 1902; Cass Lake, Minnesota, U.S.
- Died: March 29, 1992 (aged 90); Lawton, Oklahoma, U.S.
- Occupation: Film Editor

Archie Marshek (February 15, 1902 – March 29, 1992) was an American film editor whose 44-year career spanned six decades.

== Biography ==
Born in Cass Lake, Minnesota, in 1902, Marshek started his career at Joseph P. Kennedy's Film Booking Offices of America (FBO) in 1927. When Kennedy formed R.K.O. in 1929 by merging F.B.O. with the Keith-Albee-Orpheum vaudeville theater circuit and striking a deal with David Sarnoff of Radio Corporation of America to access his sound technology patents, Marshek moved to the new studio. He was a staff editor at R.K.O. - Radio Pictures from 1929 to 1936 and at Paramount Pictures from 1937 to 1967.

Marshek was the first editor to cut a three-strip, live-action Technicolor film, 1934 short La Cucaracha. He also was the first to cut a full-length, three-strip Technicolor feature film, Becky Sharp (1935). He worked with directors King Vidor, Gregory La Cava, Lewis Milestone, Rouben Mamoulian, Frank Tuttle, Jack Smight and the actors Anthony Quinn and Marlon Brando when they made their feature-film directing debuts. He cut films featuring the top stars at Paramount, including Bing Crosby, Bob Hope, Dean Martin and Jerry Lewis, and Elvis Presley.

Marshek died at the age of 90 in Lawton, Oklahoma.

== Selected filmography ==
- Legionnaires in Paris (1927)
- Her Summer Hero (1928)
- Sally of the Scandals (1928)
- The Perfect Crime (1928)
- The Air Legion (1929)
- The Voice of the Storm (1929)
- Traveling Husbands (1931)
- Consolation Marriage (1931)
- Symphony of Six Million (1932)
- Bird of Paradise (1932)
- The Most Dangerous Game (1932)
- La Cucaracha (1934)
- Becky Sharp (1935)
- The Last Days of Pompeii (1935)
- The Cat and the Canary (1939)
- This Gun for Hire (1942)
- The Glass Key (1942)
- The Strange Love of Martha Ivers (1946)
- Dear Ruth (1947)
- Whispering Smith (1948)
- A Connecticut Yankee in King Arthur's Court (1949)
- Fancy Pants (1950)
- The Lemon Drop Kid (1951)
- Road to Bali (1952)
- Pardners (1956)
- The Buccaneer (1958)
- One-Eyed Jacks (1961)
- Paris When It Sizzles (1964)
- Easy Come, Easy Go (1967)
- Bonanza (TV series)
- The High Chaparral (TV series)
- No Way to Treat a Lady (1968)
- The Illustrated Man (1969)
- Rabbit, Run (1970)
- Shoot Out (1971)
