= Love 'Em and Feed 'Em =

1927 film

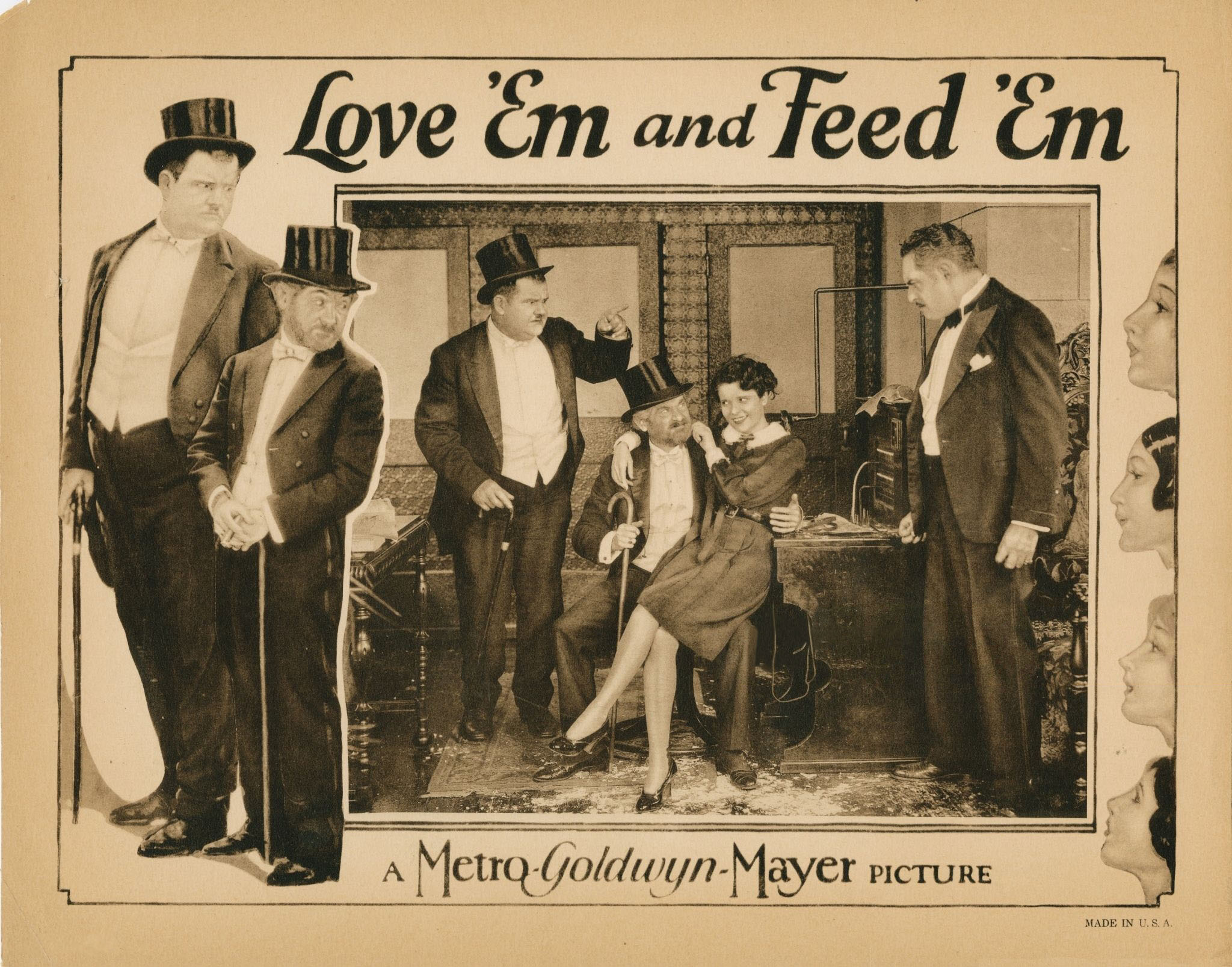
- Directed by: Clyde Bruckman
- Written by: Hal Roach; H. M. Walker
- Produced by: Hal Roach
- Starring: Max Davidson; Oliver Hardy
- Cinematography: George Stevens
- Edited by: Richard C. Currier
- Release date: November 12, 1927
- Country: United States
- Languages: Silent film English intertitles

Love 'Em and Feed 'Em is a 1927 American silent comedy film starring Max Davidson and featuring Oliver Hardy.

== Plot ==
This plot summary was published in The Moving Picture World for October 29, 1927:

On November 12 the third of the series of Max DavidsonRoach comedies is released under the title of “Love ’Em and Feed ’Em.” What the gold-diggers of Broadway did to two gold miners from the wide open spaces is a shame — but it’s funny. It is another of the prize characterizations by Davidson which are rapidly making one of the greatest of box office comedy attractions. Viola Richard and Martha Sleeper appear in the supporting cast.

== Cast ==
- Max Davidson as 'Cherokee' Cohen
- Oliver Hardy as 'Happy' Hopey
- Viola Richard as Viola, a telephone operator
- Martha Sleeper as Martha, a stenographer

== See also ==
- List of American films of 1927
- Oliver Hardy filmography
