= Tenderloin (film) =

1928 film by Michael Curtiz

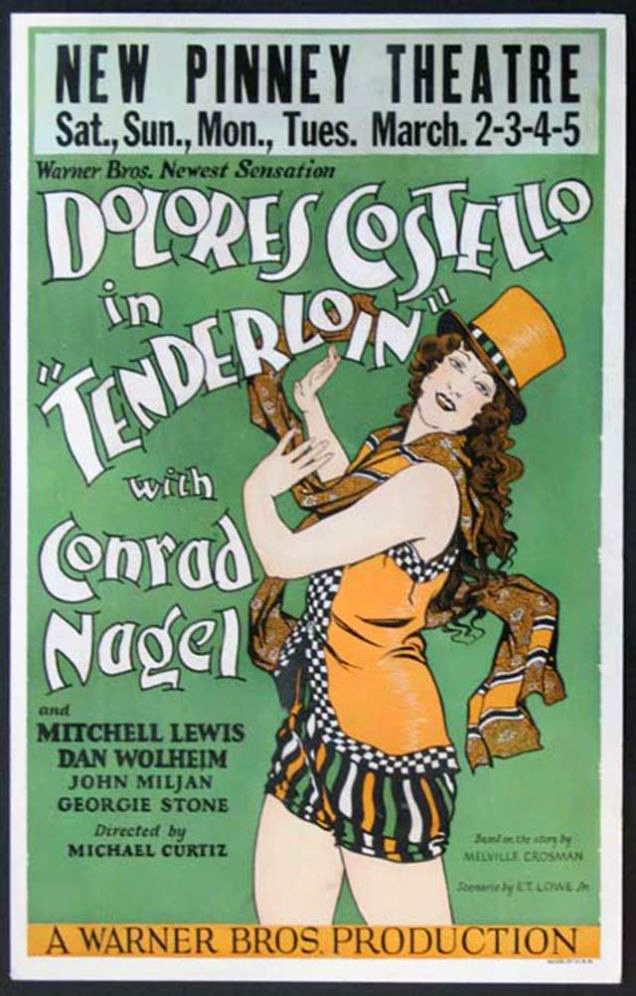
- Theatrical release poster
- Directed by: Michael Curtiz
- Written by: Edward T. Lowe Jr. (scenario, adaptation, dialogue & titles); Joseph Jackson (dialogue & titles)
- Story by: "Melvin Crossman" (Darryl Zanuck)
- Starring: Dolores Costello
- Cinematography: Hal Mohr
- Edited by: Ralph Dawson
- Production company: Warner Bros. Pictures
- Distributed by: Warner Bros. Pictures
- Release dates: March 14, 1928 (NYC); March 28, 1928 (US)
- Running time: 85 minutes
- Country: United States
- Languages: Sound (Part-Talkie); English intertitles
- Budget: $188,000
- Box office: $985,000

Tenderloin is a 1928 American sound part-talkie crime film directed by Michael Curtiz, and starring Dolores Costello. In addition to sequences with audible dialogue or talking sequences, the film features a synchronized musical score and sound effects, along with English intertitles. According to the film review in Variety, about 15 minutes of the total running time featured dialogue. The soundtrack was recorded using the Vitaphone sound-on-disc system. It was produced and released by Warner Bros. Tenderloin is considered a lost film, with no prints currently known to exist.

== Plot ==
Rose Shannon, a cabaret dancer, is in love with Chuck White, the stylish “Beau Brummell” of the Tenderloin district. One evening, she invites him to her apartment, only to discover his true nature. Terrified, she flees and stumbles upon a satchel thrown from a passing car. It bears the tag of a night-and-day bank—and seems to be filled with money.

Seizing the chance to escape her grim life and forget Chuck, Rose takes the bag. However, a policeman observes her suspicious behavior and brings her to the station. When opened, the satchel is found to contain only blank paper and iron slugs. With no evidence against her, Rose is released.

Unbeknownst to her, the satchel had been ditched by Chuck's gangster associates—Sparrow, Lefty, and the Mug—all under the leadership of the Professor. They had botched a robbery and discarded what they believed was the loot. Seeing Rose pick it up, they assume she now has the real take.

To retrieve it, the gang devises a plan. Chuck, seeking forgiveness, invites Rose to his Aunt Molly's home in the country. Weeks go by without word. The gang suspects betrayal and heads to the country hideout. A fight erupts—Chuck is beaten and tied up. The Professor convinces Rose that Chuck used her only to find the stolen loot. Crushed, she flees.

At the train station, Rose overhears Sparrow say that Chuck truly loves her. Lefty and the Mug vow revenge. Desperate to warn Chuck, Rose braves a storm to find him.

She tracks down the Professor's hideout, where the gang is holding Chuck along with a man who turns out to be the bank's cashier—a co-conspirator who has double-crossed the gang. Chaos erupts when the police raid the hideout. Gunfire is exchanged. The gang surrenders. Rose and Chuck are rescued by police.

== Cast ==
- Dolores Costello as Rose Shannon
- Conrad Nagel as Chuck White
- George E. Stone as "Sparrow"
- Mitchell Lewis as The Professor
- Dan Wolheim as "Lefty"
- Pat Hartigan as "The Mug"
- Fred Kelsey as Detective Simpson
- G. Raymond Nye as Cowles
- Evelyn Pierce as Bobbie
- Dorothy Vernon as Aunt Molly
- John Miljan as Bank Teller

== Premiere Vitaphone short subjects ==
Tenderloin premiered at the Warners' Theatre in New York City on March 14, 1928.

Title	Year
Orpheus in the Underworld Overture	1927
Beniamino Gigli & Giuseppe de Luca in Duet from Act 1 of "The Pearl Fishers" (Les pêcheurs de perles)	1927
Abe Lyman and His Orchestra	1928
Xavier Cugat and His Gigolos ("A Spanish Ensemble”)	1928
Adele Rowland in "Stories in Song"	1928

== Production ==
Tenderloin was the second Vitaphone feature with talking sequences that Warner Bros. released, five months after The Jazz Singer. The film contained 15 minutes of spoken dialog, and Warners promoted it as the first film in which actors actually spoke their roles. Reportedly, at the film's premiere, the feature was met with derisive laughter as a result of the film's stilted dialogue, resulting in two of the four talking sequences being eliminated during the first week of the film's premiere run. Critic Harriette Underhill wrote that the "screen talking devices give the characters a certain lisp, slightly detracts from the serious effect."

== Censorship ==
After the opening in New York City, the New York Censor Board objected to the scene in the farmhouse bedroom and requested that the dialog be removed. The sound was removed for the scene in next day's showing.

== Box Office ==
According to Warner Bros. records, the film earned $889,000 domestically and $96,000 foreign.

== See also ==
- List of lost films
- List of early sound feature films (1926–1929)
- List of early Warner Bros. talking features

== Bibliography ==
- Hall, Mordaunt (March 15, 1928) "A Film with Dialogue" (review) The New York Times
