= Old Clothes =

1925 film

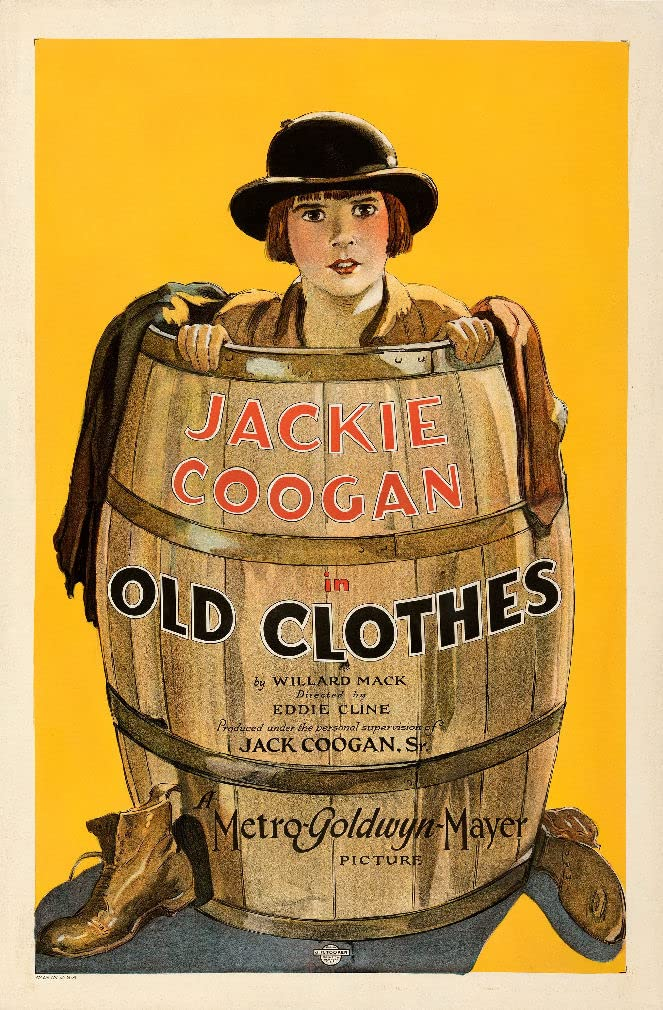
- Theatrical release poster
- Directed by: Edward F. Cline
- Screenplay by: Robert E. Hopkins
- Story by: Willard Mack
- Produced by: Jack Coogan Sr.
- Starring: Jackie Coogan; Joan Crawford; Max Davidson; Lillian Elliott; Allan Forrest
- Cinematography: Frank B. Good; Harry Davis
- Distributed by: Metro-Goldwyn-Mayer
- Release date: November 9, 1925 (United States)
- Running time: 65 minutes
- Country: United States
- Language: Silent (English intertitles)

Old Clothes is a 1925 American silent drama film directed by Edward F. Cline and starring Jackie Coogan and Joan Crawford. It was a sequel to The Rag Man. Prints of this film reportedly exist.

This was the first film in which Crawford was credited with her new name — Joan Crawford. She had been renamed by the studio, who deemed her birth name, Lucille LeSueur, as sounding unfit for a movie star.

== Plot ==
Tim Kelly and Max Ginsberg have struck it rich by investing in copper stock. But when the stock takes a dive, they are compelled to go back into their former profession — junk dealers. They take in the destitute Mary Riley as a boarder and she hits it off so well with them that she winds up becoming a partner in their rag & junk company. Mary falls in love with a man named Nathan Burke, the son of wealthy parents. Nathan's mother, however, disapproves of Mary. Eventually it is revealed that Mrs. Burke came from a poor background herself, and her long-ago sweetheart was Max. After this discovery, she gives the couple her blessings. The copper stock soars in value once again, so Kelly and Ginsberg are back in the money.

== Cast ==
- Jackie Coogan as Tim Kelly
- Max Davidson as Max Ginsberg
- Joan Crawford as Mary Kelly
- Allan Forrest as Nathan Burke
- Lillian Elliott as Mrs. Burke
- James Mason as Dapper Dan
- Stanton Heck as The adjuster
- Dynamite the Horse
