= Pass the Gravy =

1928 film

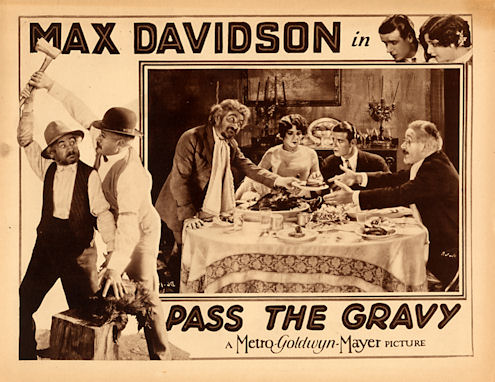
- Lobby card advertising film
- Directed by: Fred Guiol
- Written by: Fred Guiol
- Produced by: Hal Roach
- Starring: Max Davidson; Gene Morgan; Spec O'Donnell; Martha Sleeper; Bert Sprotte
- Cinematography: George Stevens
- Edited by: Richard C. Currier
- Production company: Hal Roach Studios
- Distributed by: Metro-Goldwyn-Mayer Distributing Corporation
- Release date: January 1928
- Running time: 2 reels
- Country: United States
- Language: Silent

Pass the Gravy is a 1928 short comedy silent film directed by Fred Guiol and supervised by Leo McCarey. It stars Max Davidson, Gene Morgan, Spec O'Donnell, Martha Sleeper, and Bert Sprotte. The movie was produced by Hal Roach and distributed by Metro-Goldwyn-Mayer Distributing Corporation. In 1998, the film was deemed "culturally significant" by the Library of Congress and selected for preservation in the United States National Film Registry.

== Plot ==
Schultz is proud of his prize-winning rooster, Brigham. Davidson, who lives next door, raises flowers and has a son named Ignatz. Schultz's son has just become engaged to Davidson's daughter. Although the two fathers don't get along, their children's engagement seems like a good time to bury the hatchet. A celebration dinner is planned and Ignatz is given two dollars to go purchase a chicken. But Ignatz, wanting to keep the money for himself, takes Brigham instead. When the families gather together to eat the chicken, Ignatz realizes that he left Brigham's 1st Prize tag on the now cooked leg. Gradually, they all realize the chicken is Brigham, everyone, except the two fathers, Schultz and Davidson. Ignatz runs away from home, but not before having an ambulance "stand by" for emergencies. The engaged couple pantomime the truth to Davidson who after a scuffle runs away too.

The engaged couple's pantomime efforts become increasingly frantic, and include the woman "laying an egg" and the man mussing his hair and impersonating a rooster. When Davidson catches on, a game of "keepaway' develops with the incriminating drumstick; including forward passes and flying tackles.

== Cast ==
- Max Davidson - The father
- Gene Morgan - Schultz's son
- Spec O'Donnell - Ignatz
- Martha Sleeper - The daughter
- Bert Sprotte - Schultz
