= Why Girls Say No =

1927 film

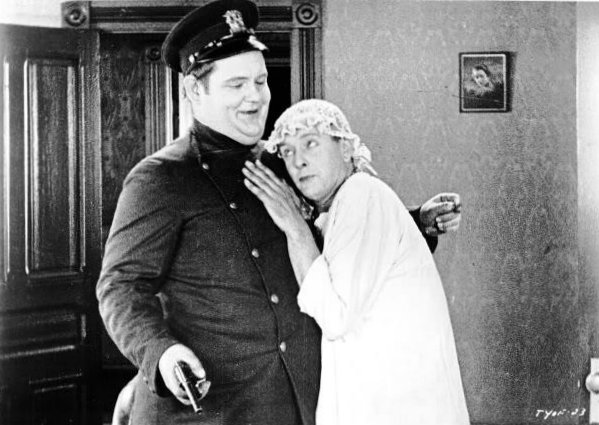
- Still with Oliver Hardy
- Directed by: Leo McCarey
- Written by: Stan Laurel; H. M. Walker
- Produced by: Hal Roach
- Starring: Marjorie Daw; Max Davidson
- Cinematography: Frank Young
- Edited by: Richard C. Currier
- Distributed by: Pathé Exchange
- Release date: February 20, 1927
- Running time: 2 reels
- Country: United States
- Language: Silent (English intertitles)

The film

Why Girls Say No is a 1927 American silent comedy film directed by Leo McCarey, starring Marjorie Daw and Max Davidson, and featuring Oliver Hardy in a supporting role.

== Plot ==
Every boy on the street is in love with Becky. But her father, Papa Whisselberg, insists that any suitors be Jewish. While getting her hair cut, Becky encounters an Irish-looking boy who cannot take his eyes off of her. He tries to follow her home but is temporarily sidelined by a policeman who winds up falling into a pit of water. He finally meets up with her, and she falls for him. Becky warns him against entering, saying her father would be brokenhearted if she married a non-Jewish boy. That night, the boy climbs the fire escape to meet Becky in her room. At the same time, a thief enters the house, the policeman in pursuit. Confusion ensues: the thief tries to disguise himself as a woman in a nightgown but his pants give him away. As he escorts the captured thief, the policeman again falls into the pit of water; the scene fades as he throws down his badge.

On the occasion of Papa's birthday, Becky welcomes the boy for the party. Papa warns Becky that he does not want an Irishman for her. Trying to be helpful, the boy helps clean up by bringing food into the kitchen. Mama leaves for a minute while the boy opens the oven to see a cake which collapses because of the open oven door. Embarrassed, he shuts the door, only to have Mama return to warn him against opening the oven door because the cake might collapse. Concerned about the impression he might make, he secretly removes the cake and takes it out the back door to think of what to do. Eyeing a bicycle pump, he uses it to return the cake to its air-filled state, and sneaks it back into the oven without Mama seeing. Everyone is seated for the presentation of Papa's cake. He begins to cut into it, but the nearby candles mysteriously blow out. After repeatedly trying to cut the cake only to have nearby objects flung from the force of air, Maxie reveals that the boy was responsible for making the cake full of air. Papa angrily throws him out of the house, but Becky follows, saying she is going to marry him. After a humorous pursuit down the streets of Los Angeles, Papa finally catches up as Becky and the boy enter his house. Inside the house Papa yells at the boy that his daughter is not going to marry an Irish boy. The boy then introduces his parents, who are clearly Orthodox Jews, leading to a happy ending. The film fades as Papa chases Maxie for playing a prank on him.

== Cast ==
- Marjorie Daw as Becky
- Creighton Hale as The boy
- Max Davidson as Papa Whisselberg
- Ann Brody as Mama Whisselberg
- Spec O'Donnell as Maxie Whisselberg
- Oliver Hardy as Police Officer
- Jesse De Vorska as Mr. Ginsberg
- Noah Young as Angry motorist (uncredited)

== See also ==
- Interfaith marriage in Judaism
- List of American films of 1927
