= Fluttering Hearts =

1927 film

- The film Fluttering Hearts
- Directed by: James Parrott
- Written by: Charley Chase; H. M. Walker
- Produced by: Hal Roach
- Starring: Charley Chase; Oliver Hardy; Eugene Pallette
- Edited by: Richard C. Currier
- Release date: June 19, 1927
- Running time: 23 minutes
- Country: United States
- Language: Silent (English intertitles)

Fluttering Hearts is a 1927 American silent romantic comedy film featuring Charley Chase, Oliver Hardy, and Eugene Pallette.

== Cast ==
- Charley Chase as Charley
- Martha Sleeper as Daughter
- Oliver Hardy as Big Bill
- William Burress as Father
- Eugene Pallette as Motorcycle Cop
- Kay Deslys as Big Bill's girl
- May Wallace as Mother
- Charlie Hall as Man under car
- Edgar Dearing as Doorman (uncredited)
- Jack Gavin as Secondary role (uncredited)
- Dick Gilbert as Secondary role (uncredited)
- Clara Guiol as Store Worker (uncredited)
