= Call of the Cuckoo =

1927 film

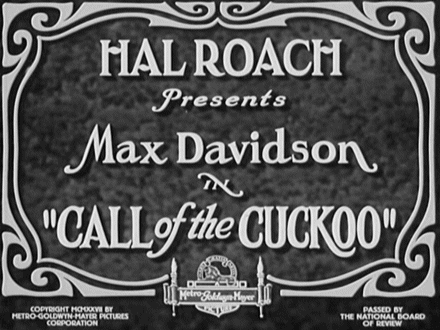
- Directed by: Clyde Bruckman
- Written by: H. M. Walker (titles)
- Produced by: Hal Roach
- Starring: Max Davidson
- Cinematography: Floyd Jackman
- Edited by: Richard C. Currier
- Distributed by: Metro-Goldwyn-Mayer
- Release date: October 15, 1927
- Running time: 18:42
- Country: United States
- Languages: Silent film; English intertitles

Full film

Call of the Cuckoo (1927) is a Hal Roach two-reel silent film released by Metro-Goldwyn-Mayer. The film's principal star is comedian Max Davidson, though the film is just as well known for cameos from other Roach stars at the time. These cameos include renowned supporting player James Finlayson, Charley Chase, and a pre-teaming Stan Laurel and Oliver Hardy.

== Plot ==
Papa Gimplewart exchanges his house, in order to escape the antics of his strange next-door neighbors, the "cuckoos", often assumed to be inmates in a lunatic asylum. They include characters played by Laurel and Hardy. Their activities include shooting an apple perched on someone's head, and carrying bricks on a human wheelbarrow. Unfortunately, the new house turns out to be jerry-built, put up in two days. The electrics, water taps and cooker are cross-connected. During the housewarming party, a fight breaks out between the guests. After several disasters occur, Papa Gimplewart asks, "Is there anything else can happen?". He then realizes that the same strange neighbors have just moved in next door.

Among the disasters are a mop removing the pattern from the kitchen floor, dirty bath water leaking from upstairs onto a meal, and a piano which slides down a sloping floor, crashes through a wall and demolishes the family car.

The couple's teenage son always lurks annoyingly, puts off the first house buyer by explaining about the neighbors, and repeatedly baulks his father's attempts to fix the flooring.

== Production ==
The opening cast list and some intertitles vary between several versions of this film. For example, the 1955 Blackhawk Films edition omits Leo Willis, and replaces "chivvy" with "nose".

Laurel and Hardy have close-cropped hair from making their previous film The Second Hundred Years just days earlier.

Excerpts from this film appeared in the Robert Youngson 1965 documentary Laurel and Hardy's Laughing 20's.

== Cast ==
- Max Davidson as Papa Gimplewart
- Spec O'Donnell as love's greatest mistake
- Lillian Elliott as Mama Gimplewart
- Leo Willis as party guest
- Stan Laurel as asylum inmate
- Oliver Hardy as asylum inmate
- Charley Chase as asylum inmate
- James Finlayson as asylum inmate
- Frank Brownlee as prospective house buyer (uncredited)
- Edgar Dearing as party guest (uncredited)
- Otto Fries as party guest (uncredited)
- Charlie Hall as asylum inmate (uncredited)
- Fay Holderness as party guest (uncredited)
- Charles Meakin as house buyer (uncredited)
- Lyle Tayo as party guest (uncredited)

== See also ==
- List of American films of 1927
- 1927 in film
