= Lynn Shores =

American film director

- Born: September 22, 1893; Binghamton, New York, United States
- Died: December 28, 1949 (aged 56); Los Angeles, California, United States
- Occupation: Director
- Years active: 1921–47 (film)

Lynn Shores (September 22, 1893 – December 28, 1949) was an American film director. Shores was born on September 22, 1893, in Binghamton, New York, and is best known for directing Sally's Shoulders (1928), A Million to One (1936) and Here's Flash Casey (1938). Lynn died on December 28, 1949, in Los Angeles, California.

== Selected filmography ==
- Sally's Shoulders (1928)
- Stolen Love (1928)
- Skinner's Big Idea (1928)
- Sally of the Scandals (1928)
- The Jazz Age (1929)
- The Voice of the Storm (1929)
- The Delightful Rogue (1929)
- The Glory Trail (1936)
- Rebellion (1936)
- Here's Flash Casey (1937)
- The Shadow Strikes (1937)
- Woman in Distress (1937)
- Charlie Chan at the Wax Museum (1940)
- Golden Hoofs (1941)

== Bibliography ==
- Munden, Kenneth White (1997). The American Film Institute Catalog of Motion Pictures Produced in the United States, Part 1. University of California Press.
