= Flying Elephants =

1928 short film by Frank Butler

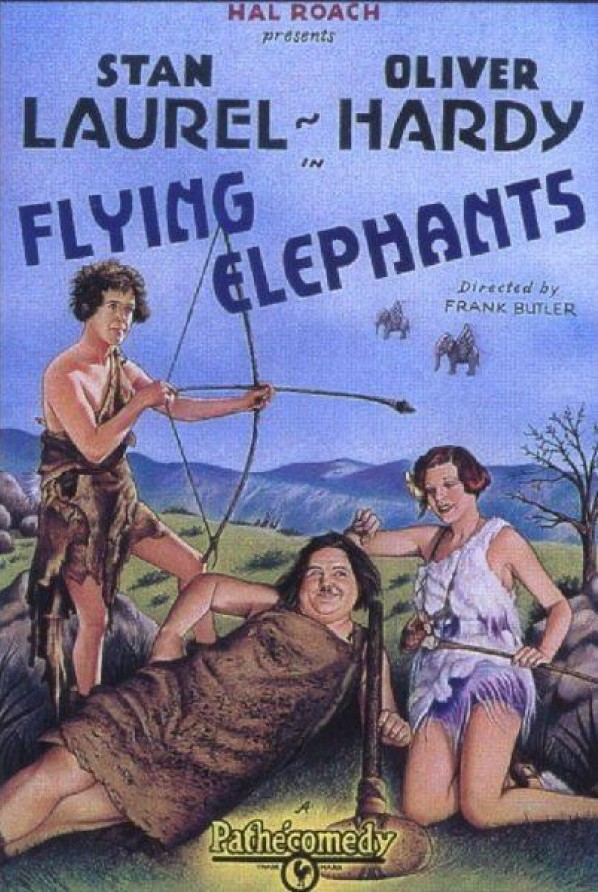
- Theatrical release poster
- Directed by: Frank Butler
- Written by: Hal Roach; H.M. Walker (titles)
- Produced by: Hal Roach
- Starring: Stan Laurel; Oliver Hardy; Jimmy Finlayson; Dorothy Coburn; Viola Richard; Fay Lanphier; Budd Fine; Tiny Sandford; Leo Willis
- Distributed by: Pathé Exchange
- Release date: February 12, 1928
- Running time: 17 minutes
- Country: United States
- Languages: Silent film English (Original intertitles)

Flying Elephants is a two-reel silent film from 1928 directed by Frank Butler and co-written and produced by Hal Roach. It stars Stan Laurel and Oliver Hardy as a pair of battling cavemen.

== Plot ==
The narrative unfolds within a Stone Age setting, where the ruler of the cave-dwelling populace mandates that all males aged 13 to 99 must secure a female partner or risk exile. Hardy embarks on a quest to find a spouse, enduring repeated blows from irate "husbands" in his pursuit. Eventually, he encounters a potential mate but remains unaware that Laurel, his companion, also seeks her hand in marriage.

As Laurel and Hardy vie for the same woman, their rivalry escalates, leading to a series of competitions to win her favor.This includes some crude and painful attempts to cure the toothache of the girl's father, Chief Saxophonus. In a pivotal scene, Laurel attempts to eliminate his competitor by luring him to a precarious cliff edge. However, his scheme is thwarted when a hostile goat intervenes, causing Hardy to plummet from the precipice. Seizing the opportunity, Laurel claims victory and the affections of the coveted bride-to-be.

== Cast ==
- Stan Laurel - Little Twinkle Star
- Oliver Hardy - Mighty Giant
- James Finlayson - Saxophonus
- Dorothy Coburn - Gorgeous Wrestler
- Viola Richard - Blushing Rose
- Fay Lanphier - Blonde Cavewoman
- Budd Fine - Hulking Caveman
- Tiny Sandford - Hulking Caveman
- Leo Willis - Fisherman

== Production and distribution ==
Although released in February 1928, Flying Elephants was actually filmed in May 1927, before the duo were established as a comedy team. As a result, the film lacks the Laurel and Hardy trademarks and consists mostly of solo performances by the two comedians.

Taking place entirely outdoors, the rocky desert locations were photographed in Moapa, Nevada. Some locations would later be used in 1940 for Hal Roach's prehistoric drama One Million B.C..

The title Flying Elephants refers to a scene where Hardy's character points out three animated pachyderms flying up above in the sky.
