= Exclusive Rights =

1926 film by Frank O'Connor

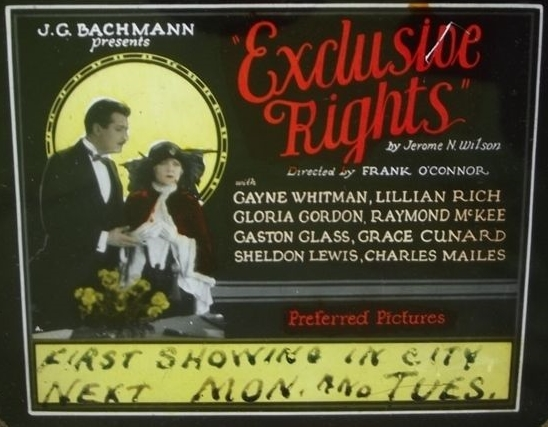
- Lantern slide advertisement
- Directed by: Frank O'Connor
- Written by: Eve Unsell
- Based on: "Invisible Government" by Jerome N. Wilson
- Starring: Gayne Whitman; Lillian Rich; Gaston Glass
- Cinematography: André Barlatier
- Production company: Preferred Pictures
- Distributed by: Preferred Pictures
- Release date: December 15, 1926
- Running time: 60 min.
- Country: United States
- Language: Silent (English intertitles)

Exclusive Rights is a 1926 American silent crime film directed by Frank O'Connor and starring Gayne Whitman, Lillian Rich, and Gaston Glass. Released by Preferred Pictures, the film was written by Eve Unsell and based upon the short story "Invisible Government" by Jerome N. Wilson.

== Plot ==
In the race for governor, Stanley Wharton emerges as a staunch opponent of Al Morris, a powerful figure controlling both criminals and politicians behind the scenes. After winning the election, Wharton upholds the death sentence of Bickel, a member of a criminal gang, for a murder conviction.

Meanwhile, Morris, in collaboration with Catherine Courtwright, Wharton's fiancée, aims to pass a new law abolishing capital punishment. To achieve this, Morris orchestrates a scheme to frame Wharton's war comrade, Mack Miller, for the murder of Bat Hoover at the Elite Club, a known gang hangout.

Caught between his loyalty to his friend and his responsibilities as governor, Wharton refuses to sign the bill, despite Catherine breaking off their engagement. Sadie, secretly married to Mack, obtains a confession from Flash Fleming, but Fleming is killed before he can sign it. Wharton employs a strategic maneuver to deceive Morris into believing that Mack has been executed, ultimately forcing Morris to reveal crucial information and obtaining a statement from Bickel.

== Cast ==
- Gayne Whitman as Stanley Wharton
- Lillian Rich as Catherine Courtwright
- Gloria Gordon as Mae Morton
- Raymond McKee as Mack Miller
- Gaston Glass as Flash Fleming
- Grace Cunard as Nightclub Hostess
- Sheldon Lewis as Bickel
- Charles Hill Mailes as Booss Morris
- Shirley Palmer as Sadie Towner
- James Bradbury Jr. as Bat Hoover
- Fletcher Norton as Garth
- Jimmy Savo as Specialty Dancer
- Viola Richard

== Production ==
In 1924, Will H. Hays of the Motion Picture Producers and Distributors of America issued a set of recommendations dubbed "the Formula" which the studios were advised to heed to maintain morality in their film plots. With scenes showing an electric chair and partial female nudity, and its assertion that criminal gangs controlled the state government, the film (and others) showed the recommendations of the Formula could be ignored.

== Bibliography ==
- Munden, Kenneth White. The American Film Institute Catalog of Motion Pictures Produced in the United States, Part 1. University of California Press, 1997.
