= The Heckler (film) =

- Directed by: Del Lord
- Written by: John Grey
- Produced by: Charley Chase; Del Lord; Hugh McCollum
- Starring: Charley Chase; Bruce Bennett; Richard Fiske
- Cinematography: Henry Freulich
- Edited by: Arthur Seid
- Release date: 1940
- Running time: 20 mins
- Country: United States
- Language: English

The Heckler (1940) is an American short film produced by Columbia Pictures Corporation directed by Del Lord and starring Charley Chase.

== Plot ==
At a baseball game, an irritating heckler (Charley Chase) annoys the crowd and the players with his obnoxious taunts.

== Reception ==
The Heckler has received positive reviews. Hal Erickson wrote that, "The Heckler is without question one of the most consistently funny shorts ever assembled at Columbia, not to mention one of Charley Chase's most hilarious performances." In his book The Great Baseball Films, Rob Edelman described The Heckler as "one of the best-ever baseball-related talkie shorts." Film critic Leonard Maltin wrote that The Heckler was one of Charley Chase's "best starring comedies" and included it in his book "The Great Movie Shorts."

It was remade with minimal stock footage as "Mr. Noisy" starring Shemp Howard in 1946.
