= Pleasure Before Business =

1927 film

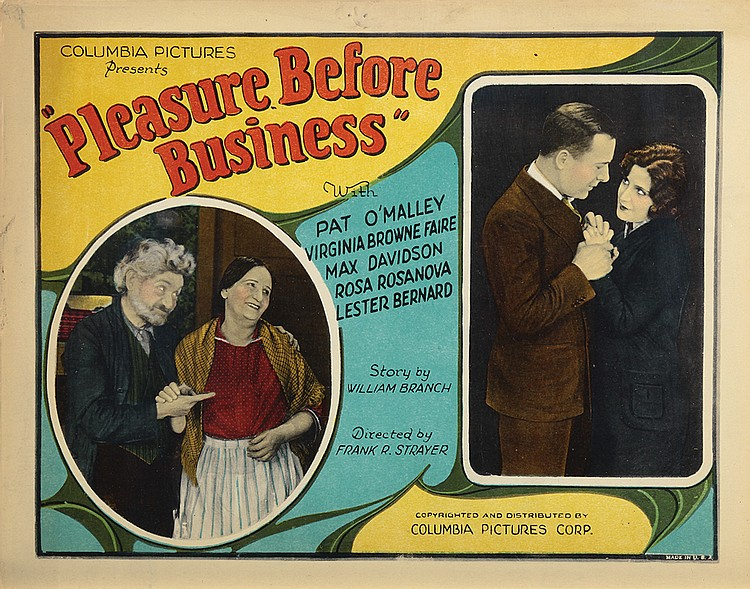
- Directed by: Frank R. Strayer
- Written by: William Branch
- Produced by: Harry Cohn
- Starring: Max Davidson; Virginia Brown Faire
- Cinematography: J.O. Taylor
- Distributed by: Columbia Pictures
- Release date: April 20, 1927
- Running time: 6 reels; 5,569 feet
- Country: United States
- Language: Silent film (English intertitles)

Pleasure Before Business is a 1927 silent film comedy directed by Frank R. Strayer and starring Max Davidson and Virginia Brown Faire. The film was produced and distributed by then upstart studio Columbia Pictures.

Preserved at the Library of Congress.

== Cast ==
- Pat O'Malley as Dr. Burke
- Virginia Browne Faire as Ruth Weinberg
- Max Davidson as Sam Weinberg
- Rosa Rosanova as Sarah Weinberg
- Lester Bernard as Morris Fishbein
- Tom McGuire as Scotchman
- Jack Raymond as Louie
- Henri Menjou as Captain

== Preservation and status ==
A complete copy of the film is held at the Library of Congress.
