= Mighty Like a Moose =

1926 film

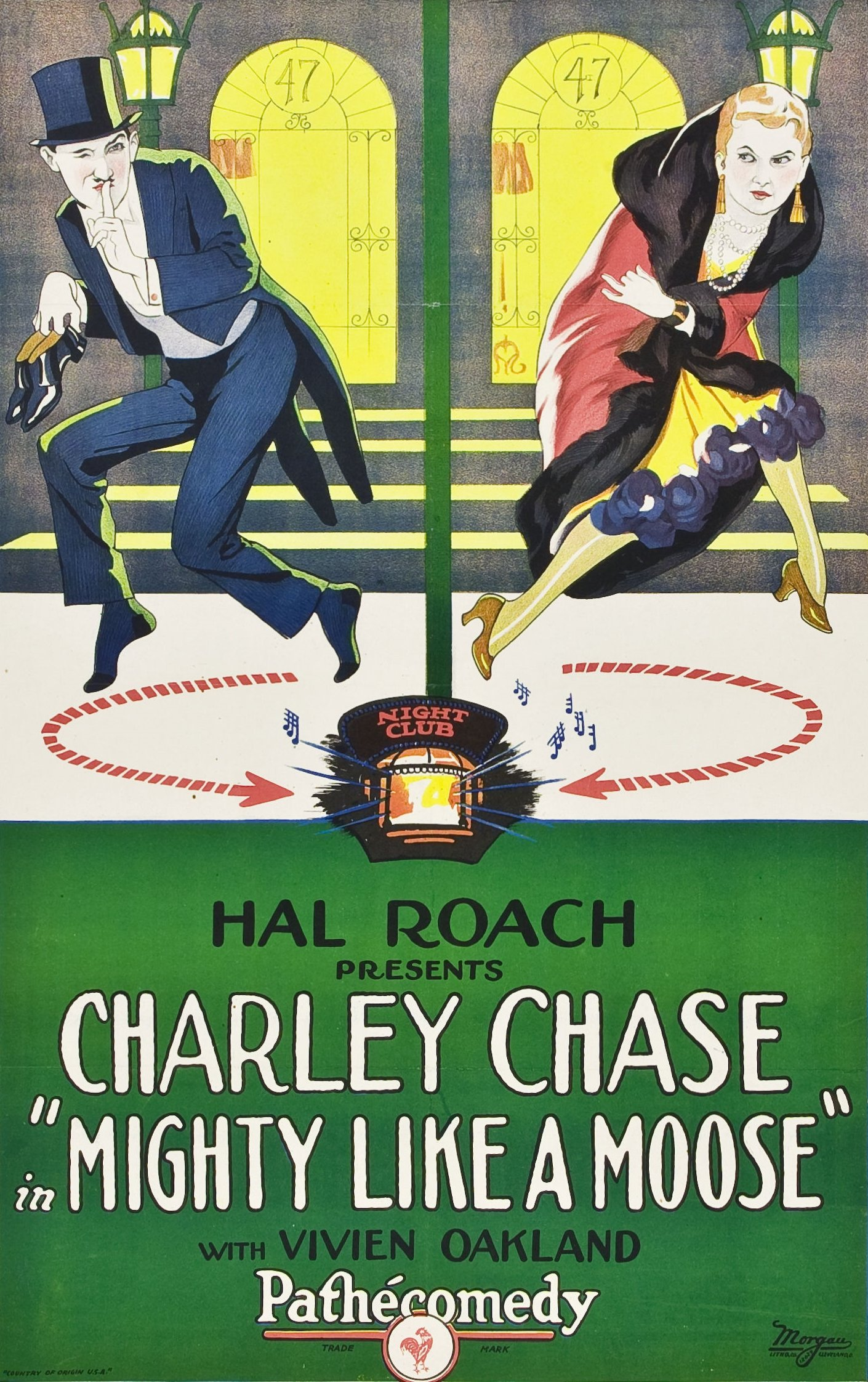
- Directed by: Leo McCarey
- Written by: Charley Chase; H. M. Walker
- Produced by: Hal Roach
- Starring: Charley Chase
- Cinematography: Len Powers
- Edited by: Richard C. Currier
- Distributed by: Pathé Exchange
- Release date: July 18, 1926
- Running time: 23 minutes
- Country: United States
- Language: Silent (English intertitles)

Mighty Like a Moose is a 1926 American silent comedy short film written by Charley Chase and directed by Leo McCarey. It was released by Pathé Exchange on July 18, 1926.

This two-reel short comedy is considered by some scholars to be Chase's finest silent film and is routinely listed among the greatest of all silent comedy short subjects. In 2007, Mighty Like A Moose was selected for preservation in the United States National Film Registry by the Library of Congress, which recognizes American films deemed "culturally, historically, or aesthetically significant."

== Plot ==
In this short silent comedy, a homely husband and his equally unsightly wife improve their looks with plastic surgery without telling each other. The two later meet, and not recognizing each other, begin to flirt, both thinking they are cheating on their spouse. The film is representative of Chase's adroit blend of farce, surrealism, and sight gags.

== Cast ==
- Charley Chase as Mr. Moose
- Vivien Oakland as Mrs. Moose
- Gale Henry as Wallflower at Party
- Charles Clary as Dentist
- Ann Howe as The Mooses' Maid
- Malcolm Denny as Gigolo at Party
