= The Voice of the Storm =

1929 film

- Directed by: Lynn Shores
- Written by: Randolph Bartlett; Fred Myton; Harold Shumate; Walter Woods
- Starring: Karl Dane; Martha Sleeper; Theodore von Eltz
- Cinematography: Robert Martin
- Edited by: Archie Marshek
- Production company: Film Booking Offices of America
- Distributed by: Film Booking Offices of America
- Release date: January 13, 1929
- Country: United States
- Languages: Silent; English intertitles

The Voice of the Storm is a 1929 American silent drama film directed by Lynn Shores and starring Karl Dane, Martha Sleeper and Theodore von Eltz.

== Cast ==
- Karl Dane as Spike
- Martha Sleeper as Ruth
- Hugh Allan as Tom Powers
- Theodore von Eltz as Franklin Wells
- Brandon Hurst as Dr. Isaacs
- Warner Richmond as Dobbs
- Lydia Yeamans Titus as Mrs. Parkin

== Bibliography ==
- Munden, Kenneth White. The American Film Institute Catalog of Motion Pictures Produced in the United States, Part 1. University of California Press, 1997.
