= The Air Legion =

1929 film by Bert Glennon

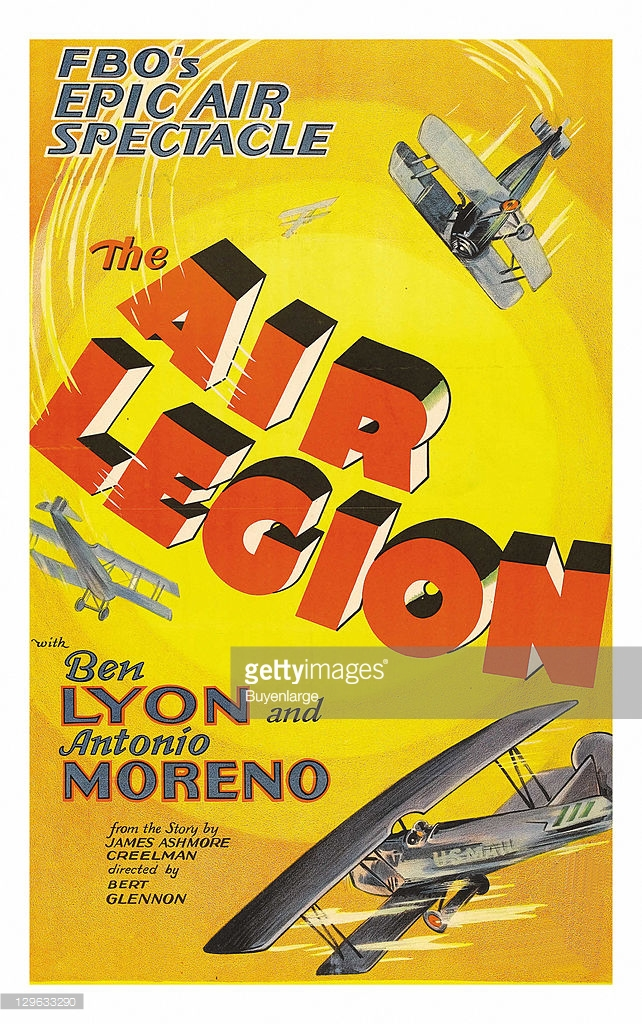
- Film poster
- Directed by: Bert Glennon; Charles Kerr
- Written by: James Ashmore Creelman (story); Fred Myton (writer); Randolph Bartlett (intertitles)
- Produced by: Film Booking Offices of America; William LeBaron
- Starring: Ben Lyon; Antonio Moreno; Martha Sleeper
- Cinematography: Paul P. Perry
- Edited by: Archie Marshek
- Production company: FBO Pictures
- Distributed by: Film Booking Offices of America
- Release date: January 6, 1929
- Running time: 70 minutes; 7 reels
- Country: USA
- Language: Silent

The Air Legion is a 1929 American aviation silent film about airmail produced and distributed by Film Booking Offices of America (FBO) and was released just as FBO was being turned into RKO Pictures. In Canada, the film was distributed by the Alliance Communications Corporation. Aviation historian Michael Paris considered the film as "virtually the last silent film" on the topic of airmail flying. (Note: The technological problems of filming with sound in an aviation environment would take a while to solve.)

Bert Glennon, a director and cinematographer, directed the film. The Air Legion stars Antonio Moreno, Ben Lyon and Martha Sleeper.

== Plot ==
Airmail pilot Steve Rogers mentors young Dave Grayson, the son of Steve's late commander in the United States Army Air Corps. On his first flight, Dave flies into a raging storm and crashes.

Thinking of himself a coward after the rough flight, Dave seeks to redeem himself. Steve covers for him and campaigns for Dave getting another chance but he again fails. In a vain attempt to avoid flying supplies to the victims of a tornado, Dave attempts to shoot himself in the leg.

With Steve's help, Dave regains his courage, later saving Steve's life. Dave wins the love of Steve's girl, Sally, and Steve gives them his blessing.

== Cast ==
- Antonio Moreno as Steve Rogers
- Ben Lyon as Dave Grayson
- Martha Sleeper as Sally
- John Gough as McGonigle
- Colin Chase as Field Manager

== Reception ==
Aviation film historian James H. Farmer in Celluloid Wings: The Impact of Movies on Aviation (1984) characterized The Air Legion as a "superior film of the period" with "refreshingly credible elements."

Aviation film historian Stephen Pendo, however, considered it a minor film, but yet an accurate example of the true dangers of flying the airmail. After a spate of aviation films that focused on aerial robbery as the main impediment, The Air Legion centered on the true issue, flying in inclement weather that threatened the safe delivery of airmail.

The Air Legion is preserved in London at the Cinema Museum.
