= Dog Shy =

1926 film

- Lobby card
- Directed by: Leo McCarey
- Written by: Charley Chase; H. M. Walker
- Produced by: Hal Roach
- Starring: Charley Chase
- Cinematography: Floyd Jackman
- Edited by: Richard C. Currier
- Distributed by: Pathé Exchange
- Release date: April 4, 1926
- Running time: 24 minutes
- Country: United States
- Language: Silent (English intertitles)

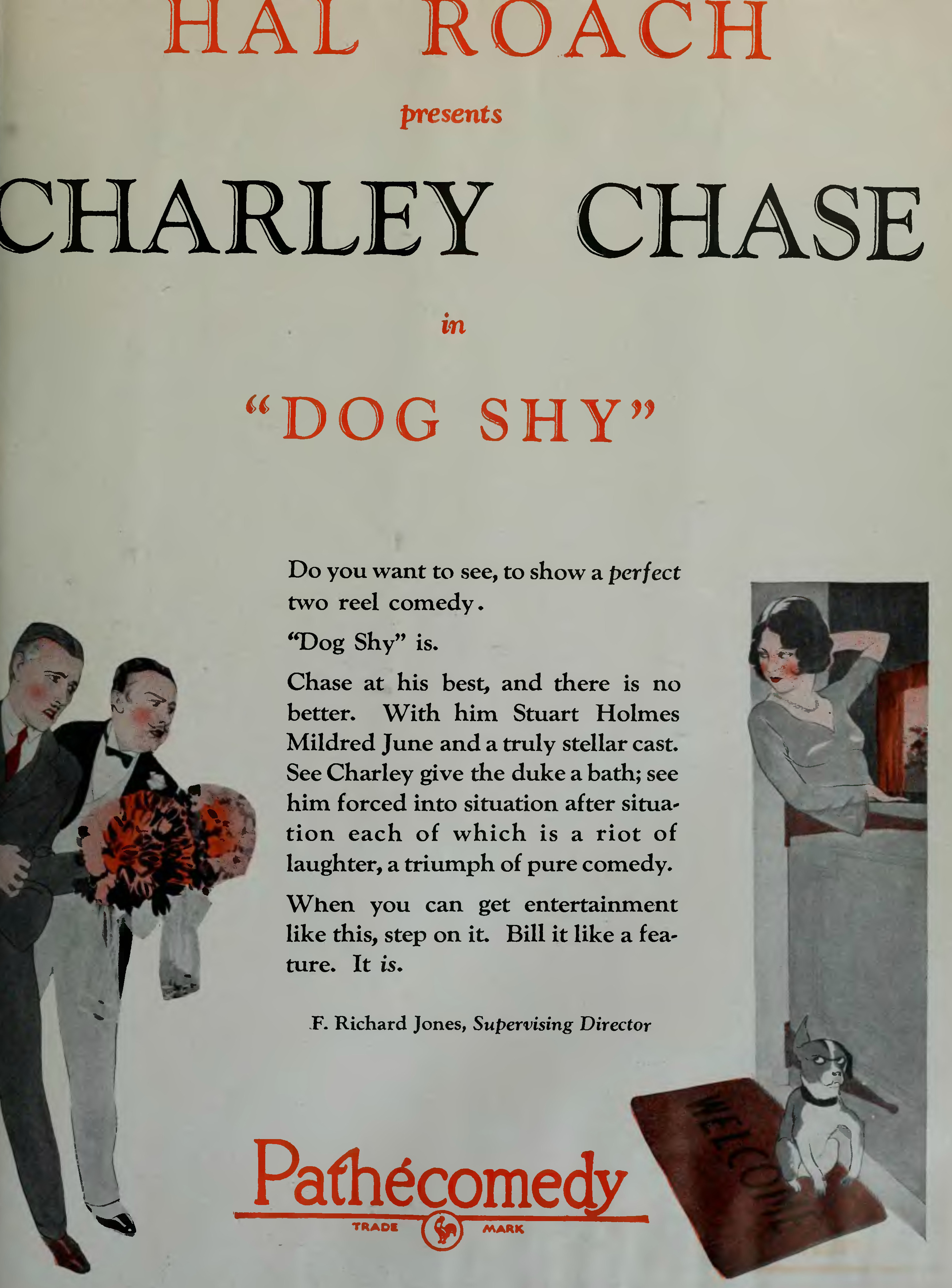
Advertisement in The Film Daily, 1926

Dog Shy is a 1926 American two-reel silent comedy film starring Charley Chase.

== Plot ==
Chase plays a young man with a fear of dogs. After being chased by one, he enters a phone booth and a young lady tells him her trouble: she is being pressured into marrying a wealthy duke against her wishes. He agrees to help her and meet at her home. He is, however, mistaken as a newly hired butler. After a series of hilarious misunderstandings and disasters, Chase is recognized as a hero and enjoys a happy ending.

== Cast ==
- Charley Chase as Charley
- Stuart Holmes as The Duke
- Mildred June as The girl
- Josephine Crowell as The girl's mother
- William Orlamond as The girl's father
- Fred Kelsey as The cop (uncredited)
- Jerry Mandy as The crook's accomplice (uncredited)
- Buddy as Duke the dog (uncredited)
