= Sailors, Beware! =

1927 film

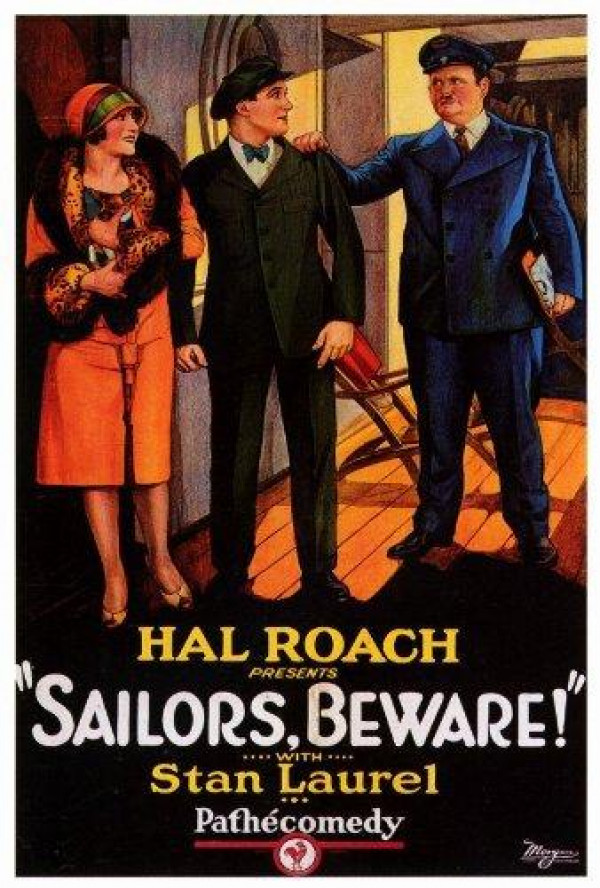
- Theatrical poster
- Directed by: Fred Guiol; Hal Yates
- Written by: Hal Roach; H.M. Walker (titles)
- Produced by: Hal Roach
- Starring: Stan Laurel; Oliver Hardy
- Distributed by: Pathé Exchange
- Release date: September 25, 1927
- Running time: 19' 51"
- Country: United States
- Languages: Silent film English intertitles
- Budget

Alternative Poster
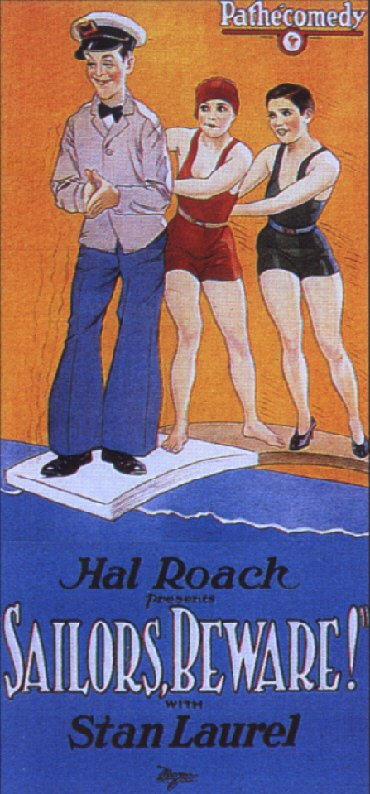

Sailors, Beware! is a silent comedy short film starring Stan Laurel and Oliver Hardy prior to their official billing as the duo Laurel and Hardy. The team appeared in a total of 107 films between 1921 and 1951.

== Plot ==
An upstanding taxi driver unknowingly picks up a woman and her "little person" accomplice, disguised as a baby, who are revealed to be criminals. Upon their departure without payment and leaving the meter running, the driver, Stan, pursues them onto a cruise ship where he uncovers their nefarious activities.

The tough Captain Bull is not pleased with the cabbie's presence, and growls that Chester can either work his way across or be murdered. Chester is put under the supervision of Purser Cryder (Hardy), who usually ends up taking the blame for the Cabbie's incompetence.

Chester suspects something is peculiar about the "Baby" when it cleans him out in a dice game. He angrily throws the "Baby" down a smokestack. Ordered to give the dirty "Baby" a bath, it is revealed to have a grown man's hairy chest. Knowing the jig is up, the "Baby" takes a measure of revenge by beating up Purser Cryder.

== Cast ==
- Stan Laurel as Chester Chaste, cabdriver
- Oliver Hardy as Purser Cryder
- Anita Garvin as Madame Ritz
- Ed Brandenburg as Other cabdriver
- Frank Brownlee as Captain Bull
- Dorothy Coburn as Lady in an easy chair
- Gustav Schaffrath as Roger/The baby
- Connie Evans as Society lady
- Barbara Pierce as Society lady
- Viola Richard as Society lady
- Tiny Sandford as Man in robe
- Will Stanton as Baron Behr
- May Wallace as Society lady
- Charley Young as a Man boarding a boat
- Lupe Vélez as Baroness Behr (uncredited)
