= Sally of the Scandals =

1928 film

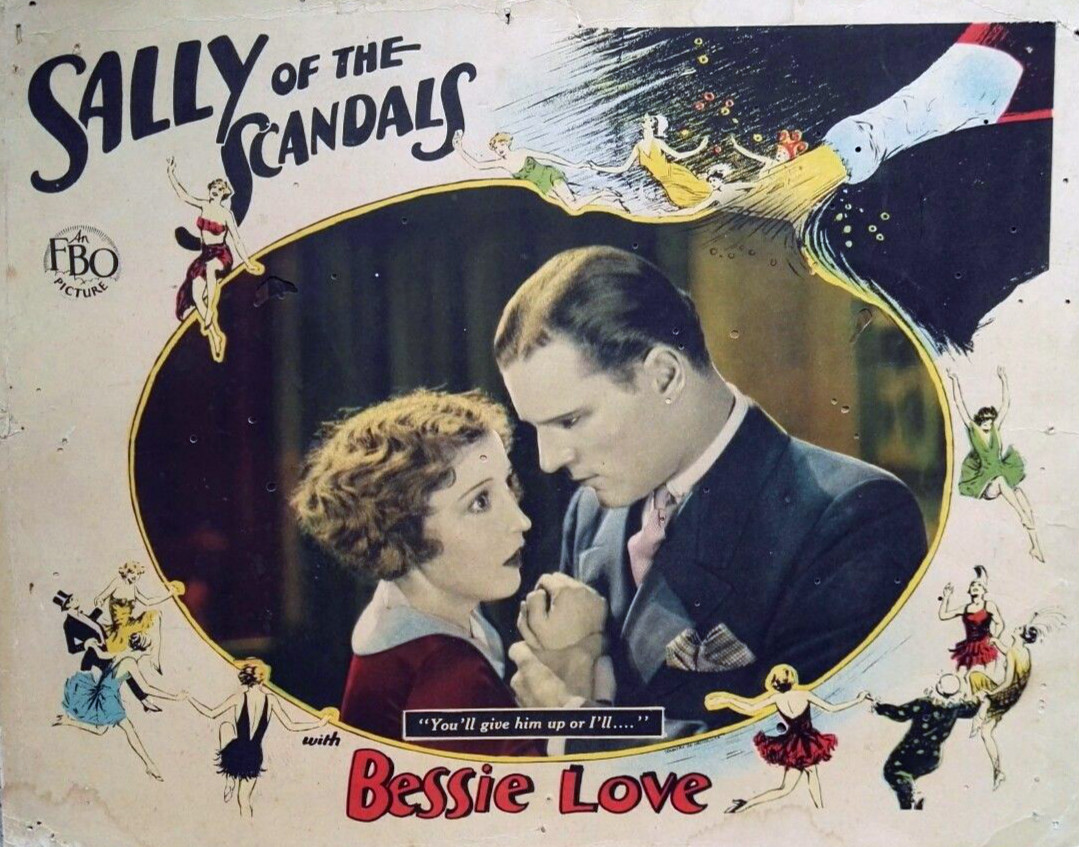
- Lobby card
- Directed by: Lynn Shores
- Written by: Enid Hibbard (story, scenario); Jack Conway (intertitles); Randolph Bartlett (intertitles)
- Starring: Bessie Love
- Cinematography: Philip Tannura
- Edited by: Archie Marshek
- Production company: Film Booking Offices of America
- Distributed by: Film Booking Offices of America
- Release date: July 15, 1928 (U.S.)
- Running time: 7 reels; 6,059 feet
- Country: United States
- Language: Silent (English intertitles)

Sally of the Scandals is a 1928 American silent crime drama film produced and released by Film Booking Offices of America. It was directed by Lynn Shores and starred Bessie Love as a chorus girl who becomes the star of a Broadway show. The film opened in New York in July 1928. Reviewers for Variety and Photoplay found the story formulaic, though Photoplay credited Love with bringing it to life. A print of the film survives in a French film archive.

== Plot ==
Chorus girl Sally Rand cares for her disabled sister, Mary. She agrees to marry Bill Reilly after he promises to pay for Mary's operation. Reilly is a gangster, but Sally believes he is a legitimate businessman. Marian Duval, the star of the Broadway show in which Sally dances, grows jealous when Steve Sinclair, the show's wealthy backer, takes an interest in Sally. When Marian's behavior threatens the show on opening night, Sally steps out of the chorus and saves the performance. At a cast party, Marian slips a diamond bracelet into Sally's pocket and accuses her of stealing it. Steve learns of Marian's and Reilly's deceptions and stops Sally from marrying Reilly. He then makes Sally the star of the show.

== Cast ==
- Bessie Love as Sally Rand
- Irene Lambert as Mary Rand
- Allan Forrest as Steve Sinclair
- Margaret Quimby as Marian Duval
- Jimmy Phillips as Kelly
- Jack Raymond as Bennie
- Jerry Miley as Bill Reilly

== Production ==
In early January 1928, The Film Daily reported that director Lynn Shores would begin filming at the FBO studios within a week. Some interior scenes were filmed using the sets and chorus of the stage production of Sunny at the Mayan Theater in Los Angeles.

== Release ==
Sally of the Scandals opened in New York at the Hippodrome in the week of July 2, 1928. Its official release date was July 15, 1928.

== Reception ==
The reviewer for Variety found the backstage story formulaic but expected it to appeal to small-town audiences, who would likely warm to Love's sweetness. The reviewer considered her Black Bottom dancing weak and rated the production only fair. Time was unimpressed, dismissing the film as sugary and judging that Love was "adequate; that is all". Photoplay dismissed it as "another story of back-stage" but credited Love with bringing life to an otherwise dull story. An Illinois exhibitor, reporting to Exhibitors Herald and Moving Picture World, rated it "a very good little program picture".

== Preservation ==
The film is preserved in the Archives françaises du film du CNC (Bois d'Arcy).
