= The Devil's Double (1916 film) =

1916 film

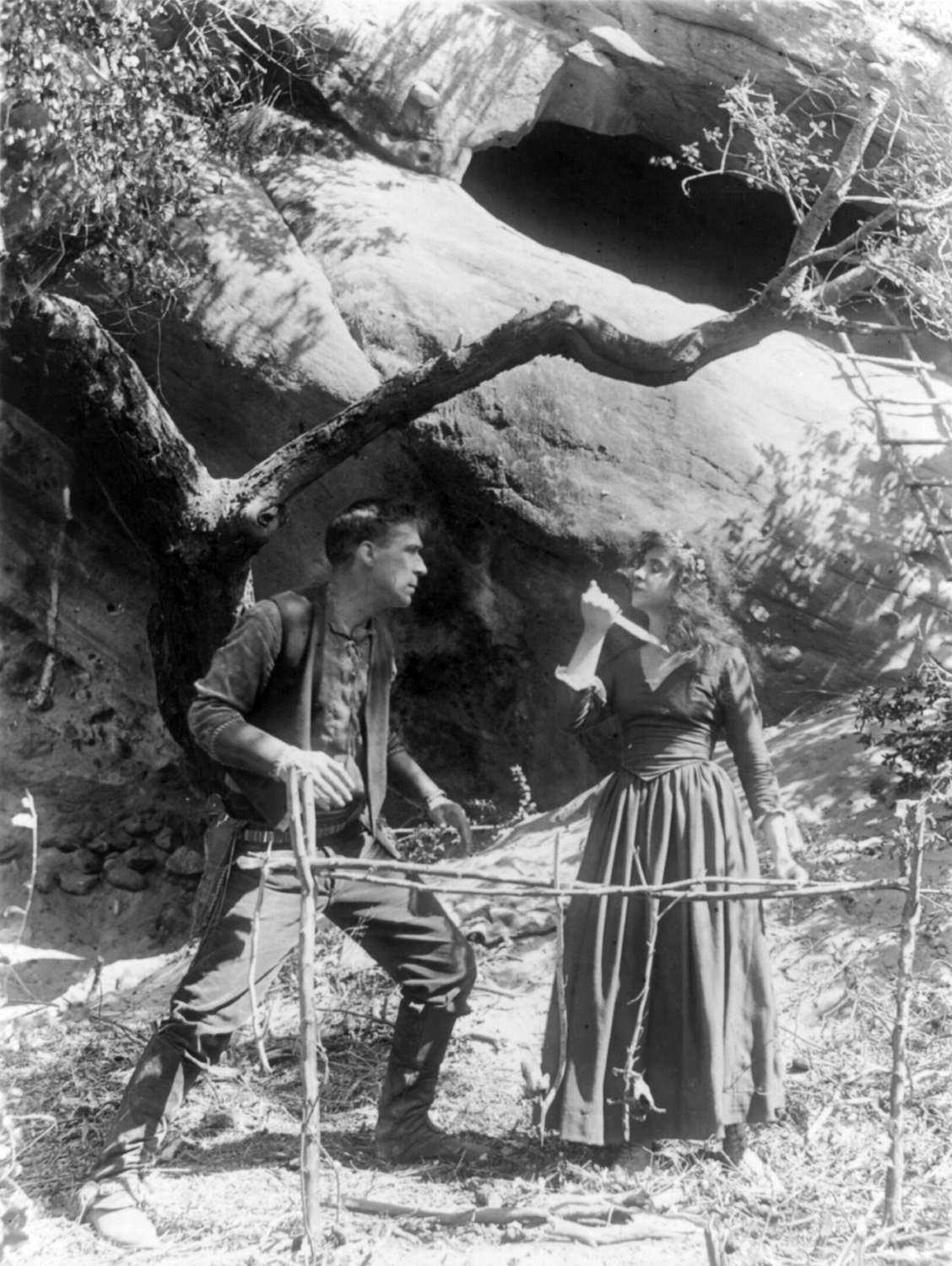
- Directed by: William S. Hart
- Written by: J. G. Hawks
- Produced by: New York Motion Picture Company
- Starring: William S. Hart; Enid Markey
- Cinematography: Joseph H. August
- Distributed by: Triangle Film Corporation
- Release date: November 26, 1916
- Running time: 50 minutes
- Country: United States
- Languages: Silent; English intertitles

The Devil's Double is a lost 1916 silent film western directed by and starring William S. Hart. It was produced by the New York Motion Picture Company and released through Triangle Film Corporation.

== Cast ==
- William S. Hart as Bowie Blake
- Enid Markey as Naomi Tarleton
- Robert McKim as Van Dyke Tarleton
- Kisaburo Kurihara as Jose Ramirez (* as Thomas Kurihara)
