= Will Stanton (actor) =

English-American character actor (1885–1969)

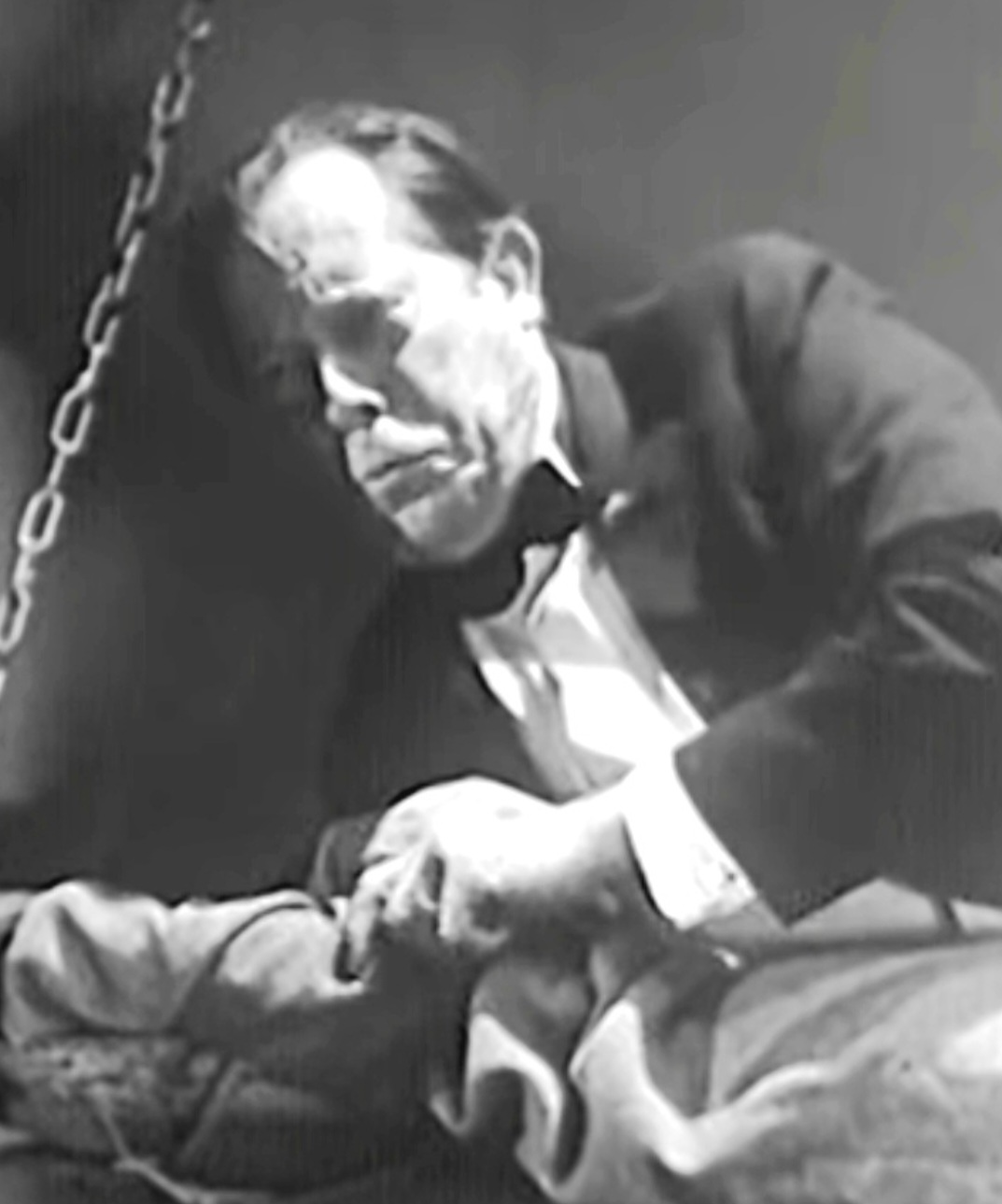
- Stanton in International Crime (1938)
- Born: William Sidney Stanton; September 18, 1885; London, England
- Died: December 18, 1969 (aged 84); Los Angeles, California, U.S.
- Resting place: Forest Lawn Memorial Park, Glendale, California
- Occupation: Actor
- Years active: 1927–1954
- Spouse: Rosalind May

William Sidney Stanton (September 18, 1885 – December 18, 1969) was an English-born American character actor, whose career spanned the first 25 years of the sound films. Stanton broke into the film industry at the end of the silent film era in 1927, appearing in several film shorts for Hal Roach Studios. He appeared in 70 films, mostly in supporting roles.

== Career ==
Stanton made his debut in a feature film with a small role in Raoul Walsh's 1928 silent film Sadie Thompson, starring Gloria Swanson, Lionel Barrymore, and Walsh. Notable films in which he appeared include: the 1933 version of Alice in Wonderland, and its cast included Cary Grant, W.C. Fields, Gary Cooper and Edward Everett Horton; the classic Mutiny on the Bounty (1935), starring Charles Laughton and Clark Gable; the 1936 film adaptation of James Fenimore Cooper's novel Last of the Mohicans; The Prince and the Pauper (1937), starring Errol Flynn; Howard Hawks' 1941 Sergeant York, with Gary Cooper; and The Ghost and Mrs. Muir (1947), directed by Joseph L. Mankiewicz. His final screen appearance was as a cab driver in the romantic comedy Adam's Rib. Stanton nade his last performance on an episode of television's Schlitz Playhouse in 1954.

== Death ==
Stanton died on December 18, 1969, in Los Angeles, and he was buried in Forest Lawn Memorial Park in Glendale.

== Filmography ==
Per AFI database

- With Love and Hisses (1927 short) as Sleeping Soldier (uncredited)
- Sailors, Beware! (1927 short) as Baron Behr (uncredited)
- Sadie Thompson (1928) as Quartermaster Bates
- The Return of Dr. Fu Manchu (1930) as Curious Passerby at Fu's Funeral (uncredited)
- Paradise Island (1930) as Limey
- Two Gun Man (1931) as Kettle-Belly (uncredited)
- Pardon Us (1931) as Insurgent Convict (uncredited)
- I Surrender Dear (1931 short) as George Dobbs (uncredited)
- Any Old Port! (1932 short) as Drunk
- Roar of the Dragon (1932) as Sailor Sam
- Me and My Gal (1932) as Drunk (uncredited)
- Cavalcade (1933) as Tommy Jolly - in the Show (uncredited)
- Sailor's Luck (1933) as J. Felix Hemingway
- Hello, Sister! (1933) as Drunk
- Alice in Wonderland (1933) as Seven of Spades (uncredited)
- Pursued (1934) as Ticket Agent (uncredited)
- The Man Who Reclaimed His Head (1934) as Drunk Soldier (uncredited)
- Baby Face Harrington (1935) as Drunken Prisoner (uncredited)
- Escapade (1935) as Singer (uncredited)
- The Irish in Us (1935) as Drunk at Fight (uncredited)
- Atlantic Adventure (1935) as Steward (uncredited)
- Bad Boy (1935) as Racker in Pool Hall (uncredited)
- The Man Who Broke the Bank at Monte Carlo (1935) as Drunken Waiter (uncredited)
- Annie Oakley (1935) as Drunk (uncredited)
- Mutiny on the Bounty (1935) as Portsmouth Joe (uncredited)
- Fury (1936) as Drunk Leaving Bar (uncredited)
- The Blackmailer (1936) as Nick (uncredited)
- The Last of the Mohicans (1936) as Jenkins
- The Gentleman from Louisiana (1936)
- White Hunter (1936) as Harry
- Lloyd's of London (1936) as Smutt
- The Prince and the Pauper (1937) as Man in Crowd (uncredited)
- Affairs of Cappy Ricks (1937) as Steward (uncredited)
- Another Dawn (1937) as John's Caddy (uncredited)
- Big City (1937) as Comet Cab Driver (uncredited)
- International Crime (1938) as Lush
- Four Men and a Prayer (1938) as Cockney in Marlanda
- Straight Place and Show (1938) as Truck Driver - Syd Robins
- Devil's Island (1939) as Bobo
- The Little Princess (1939) as Groom
- Captain Fury (1939) as Bertie Green
- Fast and Furious (1939) as Waiter (uncredited)
- We Are Not Alone (1939) as Mr. Deane (uncredited)
- The Devil and Miss Jones (1941) as Pickpocket at Precinct House (uncredited)
- Broadway Limited (1941) as Cafe Customer (uncredited)
- Sergeant York (1941) as Cockney Soldier (uncredited)
- Charley's Aunt (1941) as Messenger
- International Squadron (1941) as Minor Role (uncredited)
- Reap the Wild Wind (1942) as Rat-Faced Man (uncredited)
- This Above All (1942) as Bartender (uncredited)
- It Ain't Hay (1943) as Drunk (uncredited)
- Thumbs Up (1943) as Workman (uncredited)
- The Man from Down Under (1943) as Bettor (uncredited)
- Thank Your Lucky Stars (1943) as Pub Character in Errol Flynn Number (uncredited)
- The Lodger (1944) as Newsboy (uncredited)
- Shine on Harvest Moon (1944) as Drunk (uncredited)
- Mr. Skeffington (1944) as Sid Lapham (uncredited)
- The Canterville Ghost (1944) as Stonemason (uncredited)
- Our Hearts Were Young and Gay (1944) as Cockney Cabin Steward (uncredited)
- Lost in a Harem (1944) as Plain Native in Café (uncredited)
- A Guy, a Gal and a Pal (1945) as Barclay
- Son of Lassie (1945) as Dog Trainer (uncredited)
- Nob Hill (1945) as Tourist at Wax Museum (uncredited)
- Confidential Agent (1945) as Miner (uncredited)
- To Each His Own (1946) as Funny Little Waiter (uncredited)
- Renegades (1946) as Barfly (uncredited)
- Wife Wanted (1946) as Squint (uncredited)
- The Ghost and Mrs. Muir (1947) as Porter (uncredited)
- The Exile (1947) as Tucket
- Forever Amber (1947) as Dead Eye (uncredited)
- Slightly French (1949) as Cockney Barker (uncredited)
- Adam's Rib (1949) as Taxicab Driver (uncredited)
