= The Rag Man =

1925 film

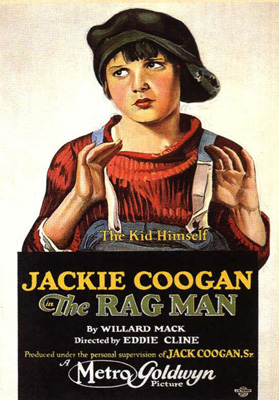
- Film poster
- Directed by: Edward F. Cline
- Written by: Willard Mack
- Produced by: Jack Coogan Sr.
- Starring: Jackie Coogan
- Cinematography: Frank B. Good; Robert Martin
- Edited by: Irene Morra
- Distributed by: Metro-Goldwyn-Mayer
- Release date: February 16, 1925
- Running time: 68 min
- Country: United States
- Language: Silent (English intertitles)

The Rag Man is a 1925 American comedy-drama film starring Jackie Coogan. The film was directed by Edward F. Cline, and written by Willard Mack. This was the first Jackie Coogan movie made entirely under the MGM banner.

== Plot ==
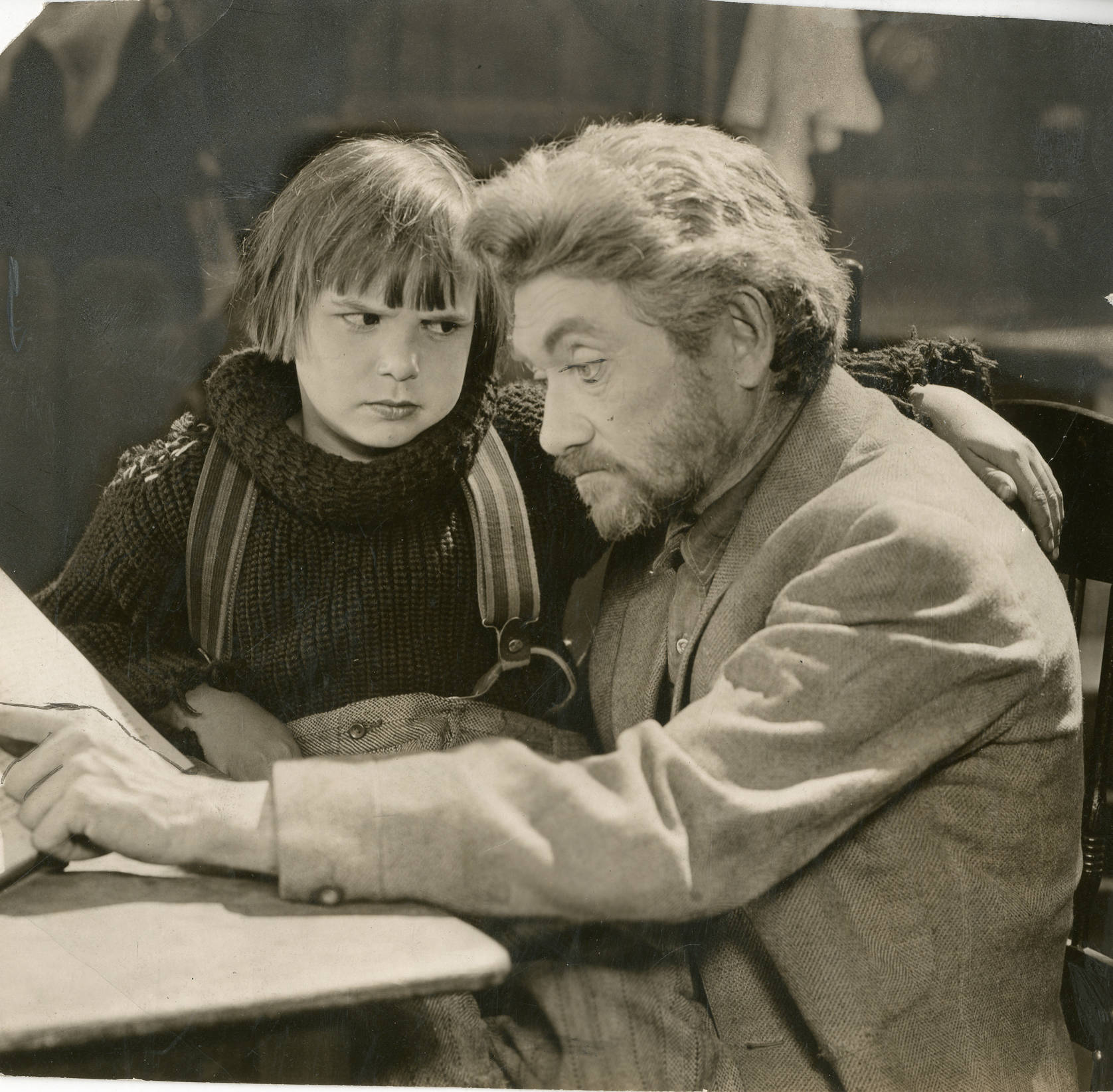

Tim Kelly is a kid who runs away from an orphanage on the Lower East Side in New York after a fire breaks out. He ends up taking refuge with Max, a lonely junk man who is down on his luck after being cheated out of a patent fortune by some unscrupulous lawyers. Little Kelly and Max form a partnership in the bottle and rag business, and eventually become close companions.

== Cast ==
- Jackie Coogan as Tim Kelly
- Max Davidson as Max Ginsberg
- Lydia Yeamans Titus as Mrs. Malloy
- Robert Edeson as Mr. Bernard
- Ethel Wales as Mrs. Bernard
- William Conklin as Mr. Richard L. Scott

== Preservation ==
A print of The Rag Man is held by MGM.
