= On the Wrong Trek =

- Directed by: Harold Law
- Produced by: Hal Roach
- Starring: Charley Chase; Rosina Lawrence; Laurel and Hardy
- Cinematography: Art Lloyd
- Edited by: William H. Ziegler
- Music by: Darrell Calker
- Distributed by: Metro-Goldwyn-Mayer
- Release date: April 18, 1936
- Running time: 18 minutes
- Country: United States
- Language: English

On the Wrong Trek is a 1936 short film starring Charley Chase, directed by Harold Law, produced by Hal Roach and distributed by MGM. It features a cameo appearance by Laurel and Hardy.

== Plot ==
Charley recounts the story of his vacation to his co-workers. For his vacation, Charley and his family drive to California, and it ends up everything but a "vacation".

Charley isn't happy about having his back-seat-driving mother-in-law along. In trying to help stalled motorist Clarence Wilson, Chase accidentally pushes his car over a cliff. Some "friendly hitchhikers" steal their car and belongings, and force the Chase's to switch clothes with them. They arrive in a hobo camp and are welcomed with open arms, and it becomes the only part of their vacation they actually enjoy.

When he finally gets back to the office, Chase discovers the irate Wilson is his new boss.

== Cast ==
- Charley Chase
- Rosina Lawrence
- Bonita Weber
- Clarence Wilson
- Stan Laurel
- Oliver Hardy

=== Laurel and Hardy cameo ===
At the start of the journey they consider taking on hitchhikers and see Stan and Oliver on the side of the road thumbing a lift (both, however, are thumbing in opposite directions until Hardy notices, slapping Laurel). Oliver is sitting on some luggage and Stan is standing, holding an umbrella. Charley remarks that they look like horse thieves, drives by and scratches the top of his head in the same way that Stan does in all of his films. They appear on screen for 13 seconds.

== Production ==
The film was released on April 18, 1936. It was the last two-reel short made in the Charley Chase series for Hal Roach. Dave Lord Heath thinks the film is unfairly and inaccurately regarded as an official part of the Laurel and Hardy film series by some. The film has its great moments, including a surprise couple of cameos, but also has a slow segment (Chase singing with a bunch of hobos) which completely brings the film to a crashing halt.
