= Harriette Underhill =

American film critic

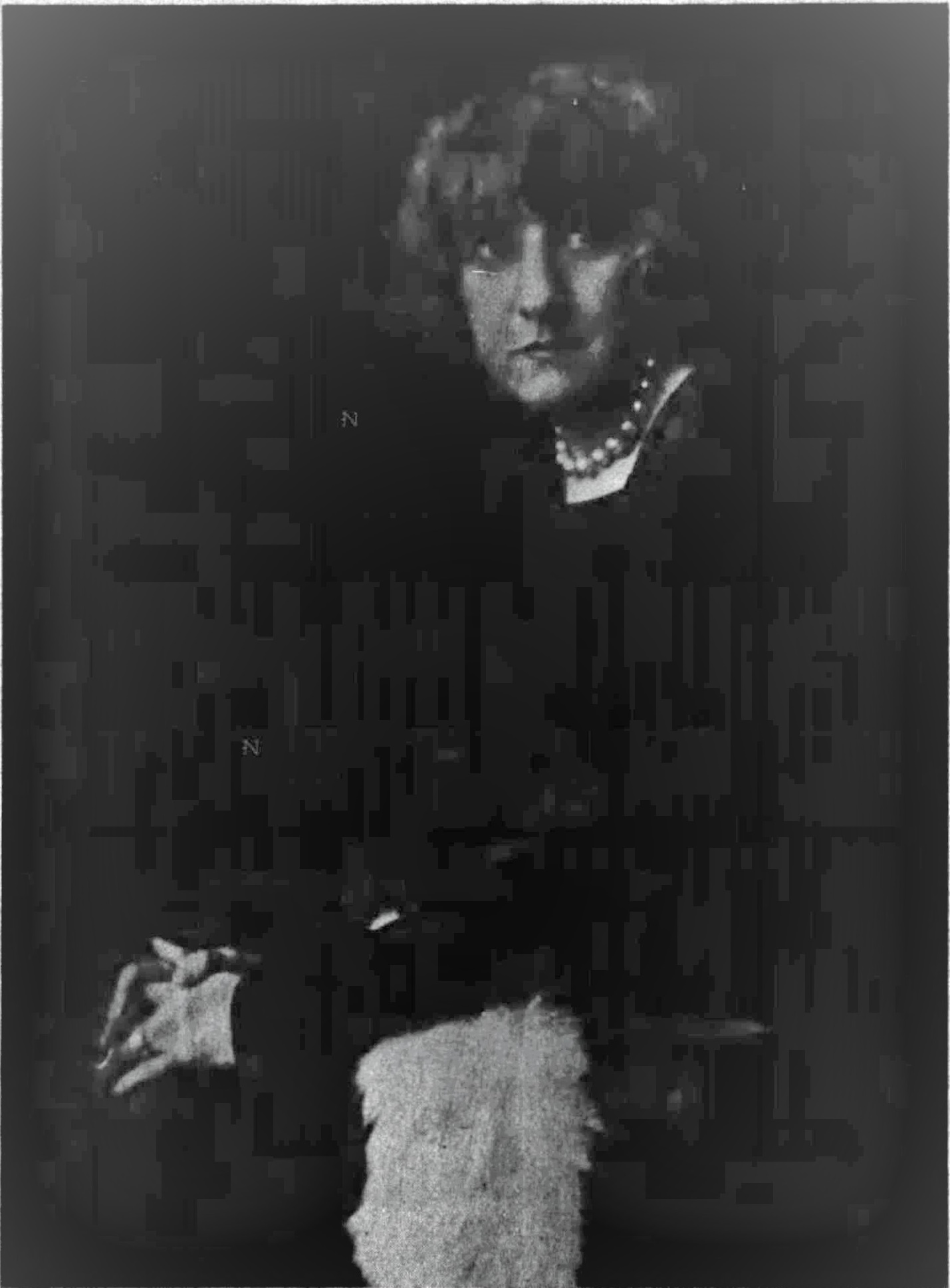
- Underhill in 1925
- Born: January 25, 1877; Troy, New York, US
- Died: May 18, 1928 (aged 51); New York City, US
- Occupations: Writer and film critic

Harriette Underhill (January 25, 1877 - May 18, 1928) was an American film critic for the New-York Tribune and its successor the New York Herald Tribune. She was the most prominent American female film critic of the silent film era.

== Biography ==
Underhill was born in Troy, New York and came to New York City not long after marrying (at age 16 according to older reports of her life). She then played minor parts in some theatre productions, including in the original chorus for the popular musical Florodora. Her father Lorenzo Underhill was a sportswriter, and she turned to journalism after his death, taking over her father's sports column at the New-York Tribune in 1908, first writing about horse and dog shows. Sometime after seeing her first movie, The Coward (1915), she asked to start writing film reviews. This was when films were first starting to get reviews in newspapers. She also wrote for film and general magazines.

Underhill was severely injured in 1919 when she was hit by a car, but continued to write. She succeeded to Virginia Tracy's film column at the Tribune. She died at her home in Manhattan on May 18, 1928, after a month-long illness, though she continued to write until the day she died, even dictating copy to her doctor and nurse.

Film scholar Richard Abel, writing in 2020 for the Women Film Pioneer Project at Columbia University, described Underhill as a "a perceptive, intelligent film critic and a compelling stylist." Her sway in Hollywood was apparent from the fact that numerous stars visited her in her final illness.

In 1923, Screenland magazine canvassed top film critics to identify the ten best movies ever made. Every critic except Underhill included The Birth of a Nation (which was already controversial at the time of its release) in their list. Of director D. W. Griffith, she once said he "is the most uneven director; some of his pictures are good and some are terrible."

== Personal ==
Underhill was married and divorced thrice per her obituary. In a 1925 interview she said "I've been married thousands of times, perhaps because I've always loved anything with an element of chance or danger."
