= Max Davidson =

German-American actor (1875–1950)

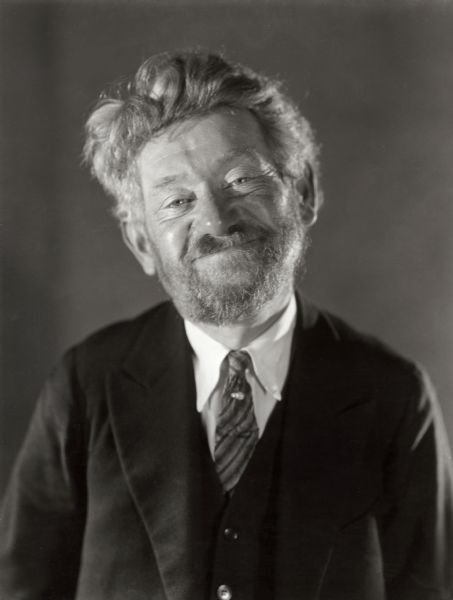
- MGM publicity photograph, 1927
- Born: May 23, 1875; Berlin, German Empire
- Died: September 4, 1950 (aged 75); Woodland Hills, Los Angeles, California, US
- Occupation: Actor
- Years active: 1912–45
- Spouse: Alice Marti (1927 – ?)

Max Davidson (May 23, 1875 – September 4, 1950) was a German-American film actor known for his comedic Jewish persona during the silent film era. With a career spanning over thirty years, Davidson appeared in over 180 films.

== Career ==
Born in Berlin to Jewish parents, Davidson emigrated to the United States in the 1890s where he began working in stock theater and vaudeville. He entered silent movies in 1912. He made a series of films featuring the character Izzy for Reliance Pictures Company in 1914. The films included Izzy Gets the Wrong Bottle, Izzy and His Rival, Izzy and the Diamond, How Izzy Stuck to His Post, How Izzy Was Saved, Izzy, the Detective, Izzy's Night Out, Izzy, the Operator, and Izzy and the Bandit.

By the mid-teens, Davidson had appeared in his first feature film, Edward Dillon's Don Quixote (1915), followed by D.W. Griffith's Intolerance, and Tod Browning's Puppets (both 1916).

He starred alongside a young Jackie Coogan in a pair of silent features, The Rag Man (1923) and Old Clothes (1925).

In 1923, he appeared in the Mack Sennett feature The Extra Girl with Mabel Normand, and in 1927 made a rare starring feature at Columbia, Pleasure Before Business, as well as playing a somewhat more serious role as a servant in the Pola Negri WW1 vehicle Hotel Imperial.

In 1926 he began working for Hal Roach, playing stereotypical Jewish comic characters. After being featured in the Mabel Normand comedy Raggedy Rose, Davidson was given a short-subject series of his own, appearing as a woebegone, put-upon fellow in such titles as Jewish-Prudence and Don't Tell Everything. He was also featured in other Hal Roach series, including the "female Laurel and Hardy" shorts co-starring Anita Garvin and Marion Byron. Davidson's best-known starring shorts are Call of the Cuckoo (1927), featuring cameos by Stan Laurel, Oliver Hardy, and Charley Chase; and the recently revived Pass the Gravy (1928), deemed "culturally significant" by the Library of Congress and selected for preservation in the National Film Registry.

== Career decline ==
Max Davidson's exaggerated Jewish caricature was popular enough with audiences to sustain a string of silent shorts, but the coming of sound gave Davidson a voice. Although Davidson's native German accent was not so thick as to ruin his chances in talking pictures, his dialect gave his screen character a new and potentially offensive dimension, and Hal Roach forestalled any protests by discontinuing the series entirely. Davidson did appear in a few of Roach's earliest talkies, including the Edgar Kennedy short Hurdy Gurdy (1929) and the Our Gang short Moan and Groan, Inc. (1929). But Davidson's established ethnic character was too broad to survive as a starring attraction, and he spent the rest of his career playing bit roles almost exclusively.

Davidson's largest role in sound films was as cowboy Tom Tyler's good-natured Jewish sidekick in the 1936 western feature Roamin' Wild. He was still familiar to the movie-comedy community; when Charlie Chaplin needed ethnic types to portray the residents of a Jewish ghetto in The Great Dictator (1940), Max Davidson was cast. He continued to play ethnic shopkeepers, opposite The Three Stooges in No Census, No Feeling (1940) and The East Side Kids in Clancy Street Boys (1943), among several other films.

His final screen appearance was in the 1945 Clark Gable film Adventure. Davidson died on September 4, 1950, in Woodland Hills, Los Angeles, California.

== Partial filmography ==
Year	Title	Role	Notes
1913	Scenting a Terrible Crime	The Superintendent	
1914	An Interrupted Séance	Landlord	
1915	Caught by the Handle	Mr. Riche	
1916	Sunshine Dad	Mystic Seer	
1916	Intolerance	Neighbor	
1916	The Heiress at Coffee Dan's	Shorty Olson	
1917	A Daughter of the Poor	Joe Eastman	Alternative titles: The Heart of the Poor; The Spitfire
1917	The Scrub Lady		Max and Marie Dressler in the film
1918	The Hun Within	Max	
1919	The Hoodlum	Abram Isaacs	
1919	The Mother and the Law	The Kindly Neighbor	
1921	No Woman Knows	Ferdinand Brandeis	
1921	The Idle Rich	The tailor	
1922	Second Hand Rose	Abe Rosenstein	
1922	Turn to the Right	Pawnbroker	
1922	Remembrance	Georges Cartier	
1922	The Right That Failed	Michael Callahan	
1923	The Ghost Patrol	Rapushkin	
1923	The Rendezvous	Commissar	
1923	The Darling of New York	Solomon Levinsky	
1924	Fools Highway	Old Levi	
1924	Hold Your Breath	Street Merchant	
1925	The Rag Man	Max Ginsburg	
1925	Old Clothes	Max Ginsburg	
1925	Justice of the Far North	Izzy Hawkins	
1925	Hogan's Alley	Clothier	
1926	Raggedy Rose	Moe Ginsberg	
1927	Hotel Imperial	Elias Butterman	
1927	Why Girls Say No	Papa Whisselberg	
1927	Pleasure Before Business	Sam Weinberg	
1927	Jewish Prudence	Papa Gimplewart	
1927	Don't Tell Everything		
1927	Should Second Husbands Come First?		
1927	Flaming Fathers		
1927	Call of the Cuckoo	Papa Gimplewart	
1927	Love 'Em and Feed 'Em		
1928	The Boy Friend	Papa Davidson	
1928	Feed 'Em and Weep	Max, restaurant manager	
1928	Pass the Gravy	The father	National Film Registry
1928	Dumb Daddies		
1928	Came the Dawn		
1929	So This Is College	Moe Levine, the tailor	
1929	Moan and Groan, Inc.	The lunatic	
1929	Hurdy Gurdy		
1930	The Shrimp	Professor Schoenheimer	
1931	The Itching Hour		
1931	Oh! Oh! Cleopatra	Royal musician	
1932	Docks of San Francisco	Max, Detective	
1933	The Cohens and Kellys in Trouble	Larsen	Uncredited
1934	Straight Is the Way	Old clothes man	Uncredited
1935	Metropolitan	Tailor	Uncredited
1936	Roamin' Wild	Abe Wineman	
1937	The Girl Said No	Max	Alternative title: With Words and Music
1939	The Great Commandment	Old man	
1940	The Great Dictator	Jewish man	Uncredited
1940	Kitty Foyle: The Natural History of a Woman	Flower man	Uncredited
1940	No Census, No Feeling	Storekeeper	Uncredited
1942	Reap the Wild Wind	Juror	Uncredited
1945	Adventure	Man in library	Uncredited
