= Charley Chase =

American actor, comedian, director, writer (1893–1940)

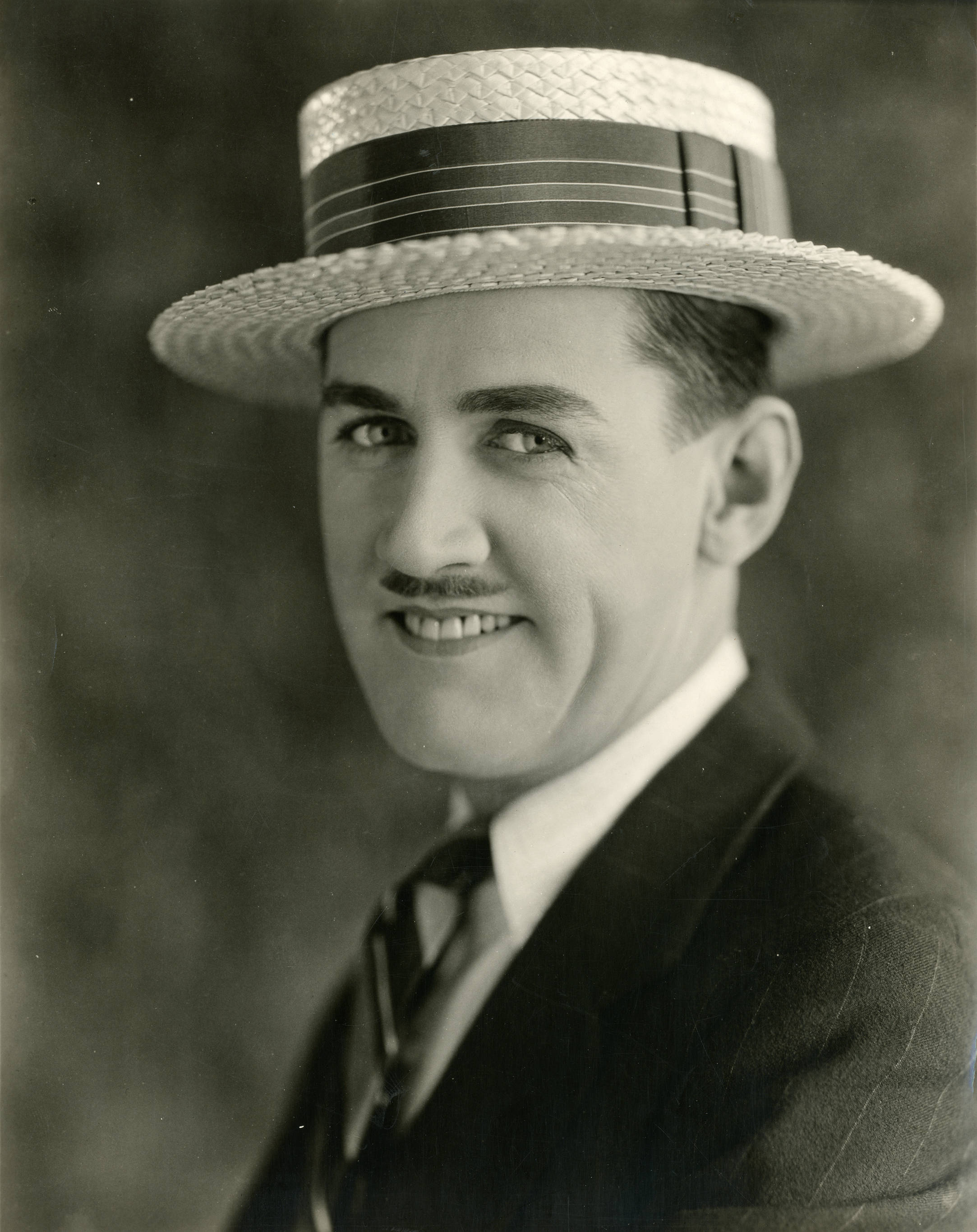
- Chase in 1926
- Born: Charles Joseph Parrott; October 20, 1893; Baltimore, Maryland, U.S.
- Died: June 20, 1940 (aged 46); Hollywood, California, U.S.
- Resting place: Forest Lawn Memorial Park, Glendale, California, U.S.
- Other names: Charlie Chase, Charles Chase, Jimmy Jump
- Occupations: Comedian; vaudevillian; actor; screenwriter; director; songwriter
- Years active: c.1906–1940
- Spouse: Bebe Eltinge (m. 1914–1940)
- Relatives: James Parrott (brother)

Charles Joseph Parrott (October 20, 1893 – June 20, 1940), known professionally by his stage name Charley Chase, was an American comedian, vaudevillian, actor, screenwriter and film director. He worked for many pioneering comedy studios but is chiefly associated with the producer Hal Roach. Chase was the elder brother of the comedian/director James Parrott.

== Life and career ==
Born Charles Joseph Parrott in Baltimore, Maryland, Charley Chase began performing in vaudeville as a teenager and started his career in films by working at the Christie Film Company in 1912. He then moved to Keystone Studios, where he began appearing in bit parts in the Mack Sennett films, including those of Charlie Chaplin. By 1915 he was playing juvenile leads in the Keystones, and directing some of the films as Charles Parrott. His Keystone credentials were good enough to get him steady work as a comedy director with other companies; he directed many of Chaplin imitator Billy West's comedies, which featured a young Oliver Hardy as a villain.

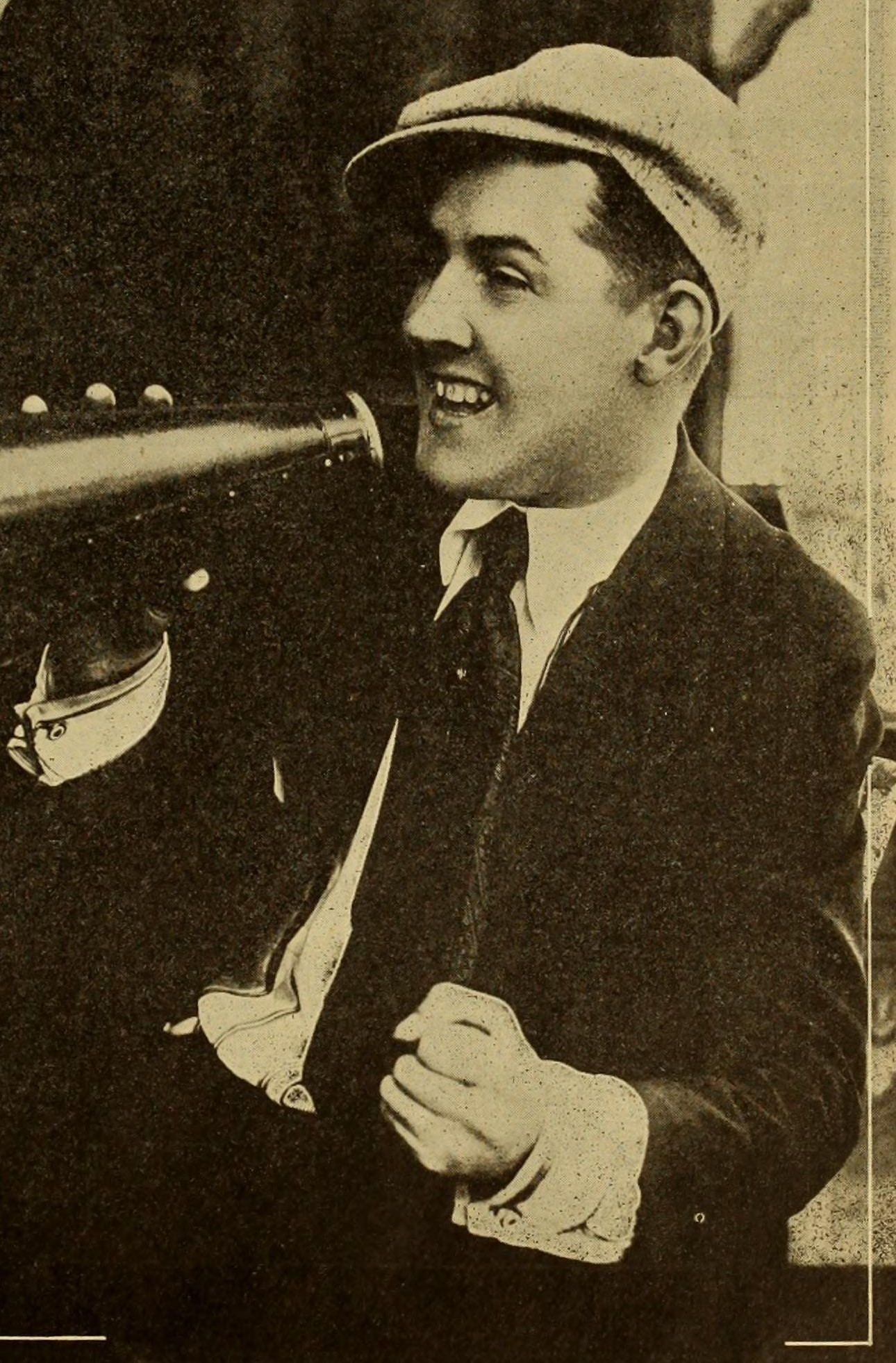
Chase directing, 1916

He worked at Henry Lehrman's L-KO Kompany during its final months of existence. Then in 1920, Chase began working as a film director for the Hal Roach Studios. Among his notable early work for Roach was supervising the first entries in the Our Gang series. Chase became director-general of the Hal Roach studio in late 1921, supervising the production of all the Roach series except the Harold Lloyd comedies. Following Lloyd's departure from the studio in 1923, Chase moved back in front of the camera with his own series of shorts, adopting the screen name Charley Chase.

Chase was a master of the comedy of embarrassment, and he played either hapless young businessmen or befuddled husbands in dozens of situation comedies. His screen persona was that of a pleasant young man with a dapper moustache and ordinary street clothes; this set him apart from the clownish makeup and crazy costumes used by his contemporaries. His earliest Roach shorts cast him as a hard-luck fellow named "Jimmie Jump" in one-reel (10-minute) comedies.

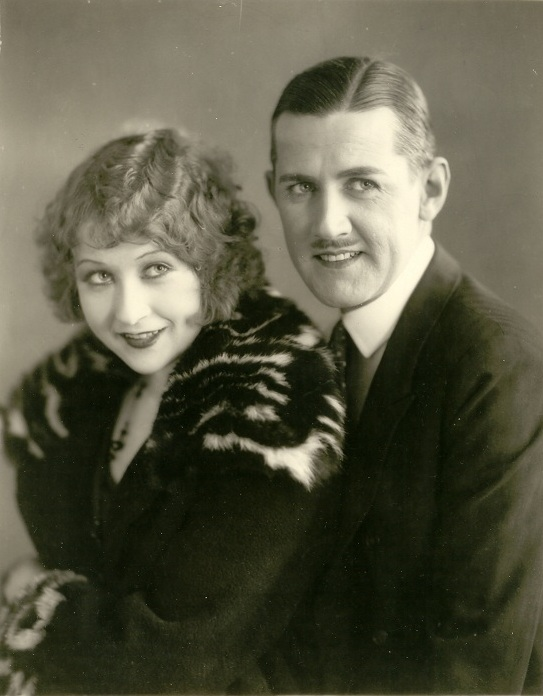
Katherine Grant and Charley Chase in a publicity photo

The first Chase series was successful and expanded to two reels (20 minutes); this would become the standard length for Chase comedies, apart from a few three-reel featurettes later. The direction of the Chase series was taken over by Leo McCarey, who, in collaboration with Chase formed the comic style of the series: characterization and farce instead of knockabout slapstick. Some of Chase's starring shorts of the 1920s, particularly Mighty Like a Moose, Crazy Like a Fox, Fluttering Hearts, and Limousine Love, are often considered to be among the finest in silent comedy. Chase remained the guiding hand behind the films, assisting anonymously with the directing, writing, and editing.

Chase moved with ease into sound films in 1929 and became one of the most popular film comedians of the period. He continued to be very prolific in the talkie era, often putting his fine singing voice on display and including his self-penned humorous songs in his comedy shorts. The two-reeler The Pip from Pittsburg, released in 1931 and co-starring Thelma Todd, is one of the most celebrated Charley Chase comedies of the sound era. Throughout the decade, the Charley Chase shorts continued to stand alongside Laurel and Hardy and Our Gang as the core output of the Roach studio. Chase was featured in the Laurel and Hardy feature Sons of the Desert; Laurel and Hardy made cameo appearances as hitchhikers in Chase's On the Wrong Trek.

On the Wrong Trek was supposed to be the final Charley Chase short subject. By 1936 producer Hal Roach was now concentrating on making ambitious feature films. Chase played a character role in the Patsy Kelly feature Kelly the Second and starred in a 55-minute feature, Bank Night, lampooning the popular Bank Night phenomenon of the 1930s. Chase's feature was plagued with a host of production and legal problems, and the film was drastically edited down to two reels and finally released as one last Charley Chase short, Neighborhood House. The 55-minute version included a subplot, in which gangsters raid the theater and hold Chase captive; this footage was removed. Featured players Margaret Irving, George Chandler, Charles Lane, and Tom Dugan were cast in the feature, but did not appear in the revised short-subject version. Chase was then dismissed from the Roach studio.

== Later years and death ==
In 1937, Chase began working at Columbia Pictures, where he spent the rest of his career starring in his own series of two-reel comedies, as well as producing and directing other Columbia comedies, including those of The Three Stooges, Andy Clyde, Smith and Dale, Walter Catlett, and Herman Bing. He directed the Stooges' classic Violent Is the Word for Curly (1938). He is often credited with writing the film's song "Swinging the Alphabet". However, the tune actually originates with 19th-century songwriter Septimus Winner. Recent research asserts that the Chase family's maid introduced the song to Chase and taught it to his daughters. Chase's own shorts at Columbia favored broader sight gags and more slapstick than his earlier work, although he does sing in two: The Grand Hooter and The Big Squirt (both 1937).

Chase reportedly suffered from depression and alcoholism for most of his professional career, and his tumultuous lifestyle began to take a serious toll on his health. His hair had turned prematurely gray, and he dyed it jet-black for his Columbia comedies. Years later Hal Roach said, "I never saw him drunk at the studio, and I never saw him sober outside of it."

His younger brother, comedy writer-director James Parrott, had personal problems resulting from a drug treatment (his diet medications were actually addictive amphetamines) and died in 1939. Chase was devastated. He had refused to give his brother money to support his drug habit, and friends knew he felt responsible for Parrott's death. He coped with the loss by throwing himself into his work and by drinking more heavily than ever, despite doctors' warnings.

The stress ultimately caught up with him. Just over a year after his brother's death, Charley Chase died of a heart attack in Hollywood, California, on June 20, 1940. He is interred in the Forest Lawn Memorial Park Cemetery near his wife Bebe Eltinge in Glendale, California.

For his contribution to the motion picture industry, Charley Chase received a star on the Hollywood Walk of Fame at 6630 Hollywood Boulevard on February 8, 1960.

== Revivals ==
Hal Roach licensed his film library to Film Classics, which re-released the Chase films to theaters in the 1940s. (The company refilmed the titles to eliminate the MGM logo and trademark, and misspelled Chase's name as "Charlie".) In 1950 the Hal Roach comedies were released to syndicated television, and Charley Chase was introduced to new audiences.

Columbia's Charley Chase comedies, unlike most of the Columbia short-subject series, were never re-released to theaters in later years; they only played first-run. Instead, the Chase scripts were recycled; 12 of the 20 stories were strong enough to be remade in the 1940s with other comedians. For example, Chase's The Heckler (1940) was remade with Shemp Howard as Mr. Noisy (1946), The Wrong Miss Wright (1937) was remade with Vera Vague as You Dear Boy! (1943), The Big Squirt was remade with Bert Wheeler as The Awful Sleuth (1951), and The Nightshirt Bandit (1938) was remade with Andy Clyde as Go Chase Yourself (1948) and Pardon My Nightshirt (1956).

Producer Robert Youngson featured Charley Chase in his feature-length compilations of silent comedies, beginning with The Golden Age of Comedy (1957) and ending with 4 Clowns (1970).

Since the 1990s, there has been a revival of interest in the films of Charley Chase, due in large part to the increased availability of his comedies. An extensive website researching his life and work, The World of Charley Chase, was created in 1996. Two books devoted to Chase followed: a biography, Smile When the Raindrops Fall, was published in 1998; The Charley Chase Scrapbook, compiled from Chase's own collections of photos, writings, and souvenirs, was published in 2016.

Chase's sound comedies for Hal Roach were briefly televised in the late 1990s on the short-lived American cable network the Odyssey Channel. Retrospectives of Chase's work organized by The Silent Clowns Film Series were held in 1999, 2001, 2006, 2008, 2018, and 2022 in New York City.

A marathon of selected Charley Chase shorts from the silent era was broadcast in 2005 on the American cable television network Turner Classic Movies. In late 2006, Turner Classic Movies began to air Charley Chase's sound-era comedies. In January 2011, several of his sound shorts were featured during Turner Classic Movies' tribute to Hal Roach Studios.

In 2007, Mighty Like a Moose (1926) was selected for inclusion in the Library of Congress's National Film Registry, solidifying its reputation as one of the most celebrated comedies of the silent era and cementing Chase's status as a pioneer of early film comedy.

Kino International released two Charley Chase DVD volumes in 2004 and 2005 for their Slapstick Symposium series. The films came from archives and collectors around the world. In 2009, VCI Entertainment released Becoming Charley Chase, a DVD boxed set of Charley Chase's early silent films.

In 2013, Sony Home Entertainment released digital restorations of Charley Chase's twenty short comedies for Columbia Pictures (1937–1940) as part of its "Columbia Choice Collection" DVD series.

During 2018–2022, the entire run of Charley Chase's sound-era short comedies for Hal Roach, produced between 1929 and 1936, was released on DVD in four volumes by Kit Parker Films. In 2024 Parker released Blu-Ray and DVD volumes of Charley Chase's vintage-1927 silent comedies.

In 2025, the monograph Charley Chase in Front Of The Camera by Lorenzo Tremarelli expanded the catalogue of Chase's work with new research into lost films from his silent era, providing updated critical analysis of his films.

== Partial filmography ==
- The Masquerader (1914 short) – Actor (uncredited)
- His New Profession - Nephew
- Tillie's Punctured Romance (1914) – Detective in movie theatre (uncredited)
- Chased into Love (1917 short)
- Her Dangerous Path (1923) – Glen Harper
- Long Live the King (1923)
- The King of Wild Horses (1924) – Boyd Fielding
- All Wet (1924 short) – Jimmie Jump
- Looking for Sally (1925 short) – Jimmie Jump
- Isn't Life Terrible? (1925 short) – The Husband
- Is Marriage Goofy (1925) – Charley
- Dog Shy (1926 short) – Charley
- Hard Boiled (1926) uncredited
- Mighty Like a Moose (1926, Short) – Mr. Moose – The Husband
- Crazy like a Fox (1926 short) – Wilson, the groom
- Bromo and Juliet (1926 short) – Charley
- The Lighter That Failed (1927 short) – Chase
- Fluttering Hearts (1927 short) – Charley
- Now I'll Tell One (1927 short) – Charley
- Call of the Cuckoo (1927 short) – Asylum inmate (uncredited)
- Limousine Love (1928 short) – The Groom
- Modern Love (1929) – John Jones
- Le joueur de golf (1930, Spanish-language version of All Teed Up)
- Chercheuses d'or (1930, Spanish-language version of Dollar Dizzy)
- Garde la bombe (1930, Spanish-language version of Looser than Loose)
- The Pip from Pittsburg (1931 short) – Charley
- Arabian Tights (1933 short) – Charley
- Sons of the Desert (1933) – Charley Chase, delegate from Texas
- Life Hesitates at 40 (1935 short) – Himself
- Public Ghost #1 (1935 short) – Himself
- On the Wrong Trek (1936 short) – Himself
- Neighborhood House (1936) – Himself
- Kelly the Second (1936) – Dr. J. Willoughby Klum
- Oh, What a Knight! (1937, director of Herman Bing short)
- Violent Is the Word for Curly (1938, director of Three Stooges short)
- Saved by the Belle (1939, director of Three Stooges short)
- Teacher's Pest (1939 short) – Himself
- The Heckler (1940 short) – Noisy

== See also ==
- List of United States comedy films
