= Clyde Cook (actor) =

Australian-American actor, comedian and vaudevillian (1891–1984)

Clyde Wilfred Cook
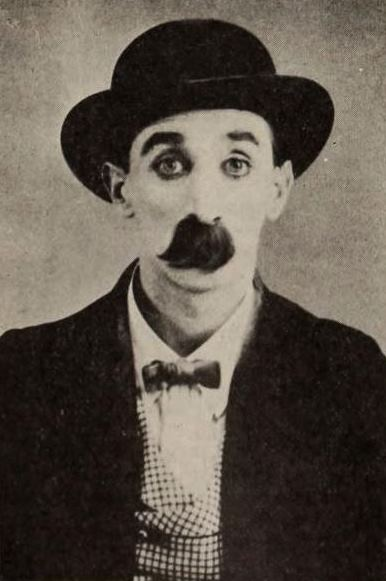
- Cook in 1920
- Born: 16 December 1891; Port Macquarie, New South Wales, Australia
- Died: 13 August 1984 (aged 92); Carpinteria, California, U.S.
- Occupations: Actor; comedian; vaudevillian
- Years active: 1901–1953
- Spouse: Alice Draper (m. 1925; div. 1938)
- Children: 1

Clyde Wilfred Cook (16 December 1891 – 13 August 1984) was an Australian-American actor, comedian and vaudevillian who went on to perform in Hollywood and whose career spanned the silent film era, talkies and television.

== Career in Australia ==
He was born to John and Annie Cook at Hamilton, near Port Macquarie, Australia. Cook moved with his family to Sydney when he was 6. He was already a skilled acrobat and dancer before he first appeared on stage in 1901 and within a few years he had developed a successful reputation as an all-around comic entertainer. In 1906, J. C. Williamson placed Cook under contract and he worked with the company until about 1911, when he departed for the United Kingdom, determined to try his luck in the London music hall scene. After some difficulty he succeeded and subsequently also worked at the Folies Bergere for 14 weeks. He returned to Australia in 1916.

Although he appears to have expressed a desire to join up during the First World War, unspecified "physical defects" (perhaps owing to his slight frame) meant he was unable to join the First Australian Imperial Force. Instead he devoted much time to fund-raising and entertaining soldiers. His trademark moustache also appeared for the first time during Australian performances in 1917. In 1918 he appeared in his first film, His Only Chance a J. C. Williamson production made to support Red Cross fund-raising. Then in 1919, at the height of the Spanish flu epidemic, Cook brought an action against J. C. Williamson over the impact on performers' contracts, caused by their closure of theatres. The action failed. Soon after Cook left Australia for the United States.

== Move to the United States ==
Appearing at the New York Hippodrome from mid-1919 until early 1920, he was reportedly an immediate success - often styled as the "Inja Rubber Idiot" in his early U.S. performances. During this season he was seen by film producer William Fox, who signed him for a series of comedy shorts to be made in Hollywood. He arrived there in 1920, making a string of comedies.

== Stardom ==
In 1925 he was signed by Hal Roach for a series of short comedies. Some of these were directed by Stan Laurel and featured ridiculous visual gags, which Cook enacted with flair. One such vignette, in Wandering Papas (1926), had Cook crossing a stream on foot, by raising his shoes to his knees and striding across the water. In addition to his acrobatics, Cook capitalized on his facial reactions, ranging from affability to determination to blank bemusement. These comedies made Clyde Cook a comedy star.

He was signed by Warner Bros. in 1927. He made a transition to supporting character roles in sound films, which revealed his Australian speaking voice. This soon typecast him in cockney roles, as in the Bulldog Drummond and Mr. Moto film series.

== Personal life ==
Cook married actress Alice (née Draper) in 1925 and a child, Julia, was born of the union. However, the marriage was not a success and they divorced acrimoniously in 1938. In 1948 Cook returned to Australia to make contact with his older brother Tom, with whom he had no contact for twelve years.

== Later career ==
Like many character players, Cook continued to play small parts into the 1950s, including television (as a London newspaper vendor in "A Ghost for Scotland Yard", a 1953 episode of The Adventures of Superman) and the Joe McDoakes movie comedies. His final film was the John Ford feature Donovan's Reef, made in 1963.

Cook died on August 13, 1984, at his home in Carpinteria, California.

== Partial filmography ==
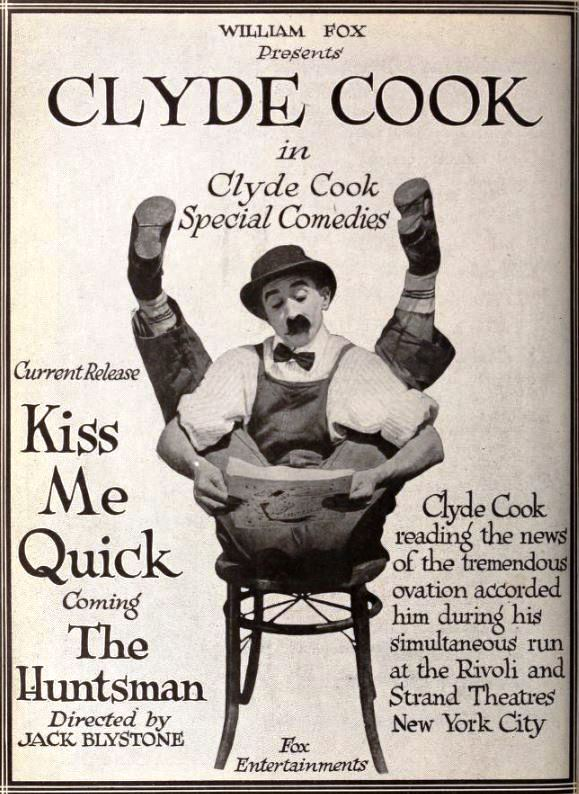
In 1920, Clyde Cook starred in Kiss Me Quick, directed by Hampton Del Ruth

- His Only Chance (1918)
- Soldiers of Fortune (1919) - (uncredited)
- Skirts (1921) - Peter Rocks Jr.
- He Who Gets Slapped (1924) - A Clown (uncredited)
- So This Is Marriage? (1924) - Mr. Brown
- Should Sailors Marry? (1925, Short) - Cyril D'Armond
- What's the World Coming To? (1926, Short) - Claudia, the Blushing Groom / the baby
- Wandering Papas (1926, Short) - Camp Cook
- Wife Tamers (1926, Short) - The Butler
- Miss Nobody (1926) - Bertie
- The Winning of Barbara Worth (1926) - Tex
- White Gold (1927) - Homer
- The Brute (1927) - Oklahoma Red
- The Climbers (1927) - Pancho Mendoza
- Simple Sis (1927) - Jerry O'Grady
- Barbed Wire (1927) - Hans
- The Bush Leaguer (1927) - Skeeter McKinnon
- A Sailor's Sweetheart (1927) - Sandy McTavish
- Good Time Charley (1927) - Bill Collins
- Beware of Married Men (1928) - Botts
- Domestic Troubles (1928) - James Bullard / Horace Bullard
- Pay as You Enter (1928) - Clyde Jones
- Five and Ten Cent Annie (1928) - Elmer Peck
- The Docks of New York (1928) - 'Sugar' Steve
- Through the Breakers (1928) - John Lancaster
- Celebrity (1928) - Circus
- Beware of Bachelors (1928) - Joe Babbitt
- Interference (1928) - Hearse Driver
- The Spieler (1928) - Luke aka 'Perfesser' McIntosh
- Captain Lash (1929) - Cocky
- Strong Boy (1929) - Pete
- A Dangerous Woman (1929) - Tubbs
- Masquerade (1929) - Blkodgett
- In the Headlines (1929) - Flashlight
- The Taming of the Shrew (1929) - Grumio
- Officer O'Brien (1930) - Limo Lewis
- Women Everywhere (1930) - Sam Jones
- The Dude Wrangler (1930) - Pinkey Fripp
- The Dawn Patrol (1930) - Bott
- Wings of Adventure (1930) - Pete 'Skeets' Smith
- Sunny (1930) - Sam
- The March of Time (1930) - Himself
- Daybreak (1931) - Josef
- Never the Twain Shall Meet (1931) - Porter
- The Secret Witness (1931) - Larson - Building Engineer
- Blondie of the Follies (1932) - Dancer
- West of Singapore (1933) - Ricky
- Oliver Twist (1933) - Chitling
- Shock (1934) - Hawkins
- The Informer (1935) - Flash Patron (uncredited)
- Calm Yourself (1935) - Joe
- The Bishop Misbehaves (1935) - Mission Patron Leading Search for Frenchy (uncredited)
- Barbary Coast (1935) - Oakie
- The White Angel (1936) - Perkins, a Soldier (uncredited)
- Tugboat Princess (1936) - Steve, the engineer
- Bulldog Drummond Escapes (1937) - Alf
- Another Dawn (1937) - Sgt. Murphy
- Wee Willie Winkie (1937) - Pipe Major Sneath
- Souls at Sea (1937) - Hendry - Coachman (uncredited)
- Love Under Fire (1937) - Bert
- One Hundred Men and a Girl (1937) - Oscar - Man in Restaurant (uncredited)
- Lancer Spy (1937) - Orderly (uncredited)
- Bulldog Drummond's Peril (1938) - Constable Sacker
- Kidnapped (1938) - Cook - Blubber
- Mysterious Mr. Moto (1938) - Sandwich Man (uncredited)
- The Storm (1938) - Tailor (uncredited)
- Storm Over Bengal (1938) - Alf
- Arrest Bulldog Drummond (1939) - Constable Sacker
- The Little Princess (1939) - Attendant
- Bulldog Drummond's Secret Police (1939) - Constable Hawkins
- Bulldog Drummond's Bride (1939) - Traffic Control Constable (uncredited)
- Pack Up Your Troubles (1939) - British Guard (uncredited)
- The Light That Failed (1939) - Soldier (uncredited)
- Wolf of New York (1940) - Jenkins (uncredited)
- The Sea Hawk (1940) - Walter Boggs
- Dance, Girl, Dance (1940) - Claude - Harris' Valet (uncredited)
- Sergeant York (1941) - Cockney Soldier (uncredited)
- Ladies in Retirement (1941) - Bates
- Unexpected Uncle (1941) - Johnny's Band Singer (uncredited)
- Suspicion (1941) - Photographer (uncredited)
- Klondike Fury (1942) - Yukon
- This Above All (1942) - Truck Driver (uncredited)
- Counter-Espionage (1942) - Hot Chestnuts Huckster (uncredited)
- White Cargo (1942) - Ted - First Mate of the Congo Queen
- Forever and a Day (1943) - Cabby
- The Mysterious Doctor (1943) - Herbert (uncredited)
- The Man from Down Under (1943) - Ginger Gaffney
- Follow the Boys (1944) - Stooge (uncredited)
- The White Cliffs of Dover (1944) - Jennings (uncredited)
- To Each His Own (1946) - Mr. Harkett
- The Verdict (1946) - Barney Cole
- Bulldog Drummond at Bay (1947) - Hotel Clerk (uncredited)
- To the Victor (1948) - Cockney Bartender
- Sword in the Desert (1949) - Sentry (uncredited)
- When Willie Comes Marching Home (1950) - Tarjack (uncredited)
- Pride of Maryland (1951) - Fred Leach
- Rogue's March (1953) - Fisherman (uncredited)
- Loose in London (1953) - English Cabbie
- The Maze (1953) - Cab Driver (uncredited)
- Abbott and Costello Meet Dr. Jekyll and Mr. Hyde (1953) - Drunk in Pub (uncredited)
- Donovan's Reef (1963) - Australian Officer (uncredited) (final film role)
