= Stop Flirting =

1925 film

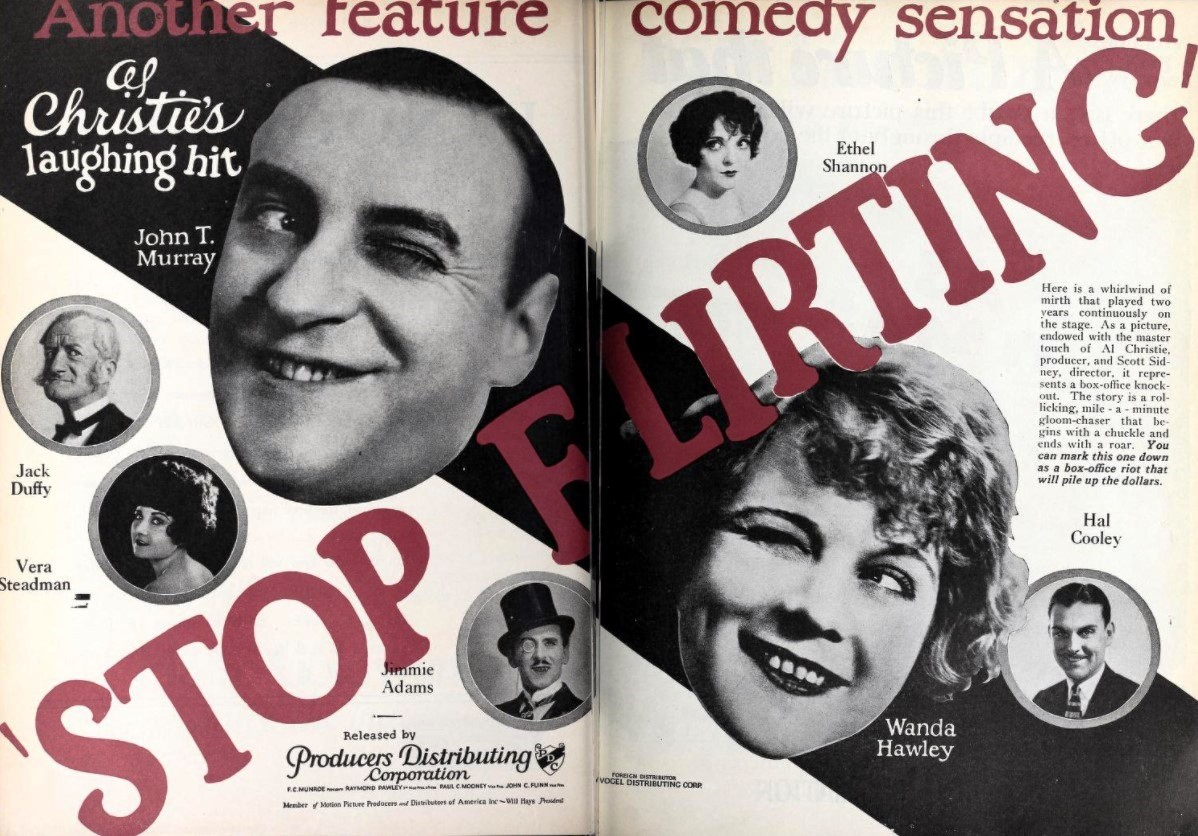
- Advertisement
- Directed by: Scott Sidney
- Written by: Joseph Farnham
- Based on: For Goodness Sake by Frederick J. Jackson
- Produced by: Al Christie; Charles Christie
- Starring: Wanda Hawley; John T. Murray; Ethel Shannon
- Cinematography: Georges Benoît
- Production company: Christie Film Company
- Distributed by: Producers Distributing Corporation
- Release date: March 30, 1925
- Running time: 60 minutes
- Country: United States
- Language: Silent (English intertitles)

Stop Flirting is a 1925 American silent comedy film directed by Scott Sidney and starring Wanda Hawley, John T. Murray, and Ethel Shannon. It is based on the 1923 West End play of the same title, which itself is based on the original 1922 Broadway musical For Goodness Sake by Frederick J. Jackson.

== Synopsis ==
On their honeymoon Vivian Reynolds finds her husband Perry in the company of another woman twice. To teach him a lesson she begins flirting with every man she encounters. To pay her back, Perry then stages his death in a plane crash. When she discovers the truth she is even more enraged. After a further series of misadventures the couple eventually reconcile.

== Cast ==
- Wanda Hawley as Vivian Marsden Reynolds, The Bride
- John T. Murray as Perry Reynolds, The Groom
- Hallam Cooley as Jeffrey Newfield
- Ethel Shannon as Marjorie Leeds
- Jimmie Adams as Baron Foucould
- Vera Steadman as Suzanne
- Jack Duffy as Joseph, the Butler
- James Harrison as Teddy
- David James as Bobby Anderson
- Rolfe Sedan as One of Vivian's Admirers

== Bibliography ==
- Connelly, Robert B. The Silents: Silent Feature Films, 1910-36, Volume 40, Issue 2. December Press, 1998.
- Munden, Kenneth White. The American Film Institute Catalog of Motion Pictures Produced in the United States, Part 1. University of California Press, 1997.
