= Miss Nobody (1926 film) =

1926 film by Lambert Hillyer

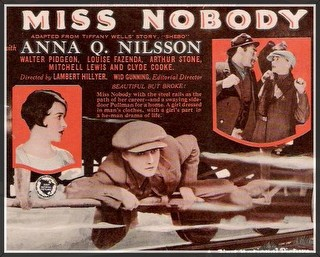
- 1926 theatrical poster
- Directed by: Lambert Hillyer
- Written by: George Marion, Jr. (intertitles)
- Based on: "Shebo" by Tiffany Wells
- Produced by: John McCormick (Production Manager)
- Starring: Anna Q. Nilsson; Walter Pidgeon; Louise Fazenda
- Cinematography: John W. Boyle
- Edited by: Alexander Hall
- Distributed by: First National Pictures
- Release date: June 27, 1926
- Running time: 7 reels; 6,859 feet
- Country: United States
- Language: Silent (English intertitles)

Miss Nobody is a 1926 American silent drama film produced and distributed by First National Pictures and directed by Lambert Hillyer. The film is based on a short story by Tiffany Wells titled "Shebo"; the likely feminine pronunciation of hobo. The stars of the film were Anna Q. Nilsson and Walter Pidgeon, then in an early role in his career. The plot of this film bears a striking resemblance to Beggars of Life, made two years later at Paramount.

== Plot ==
The father of an heiress dies broke leaving her destitute without inheritance. She falls in with a group of hobos, and she travels incognito cross country dressed as a man.

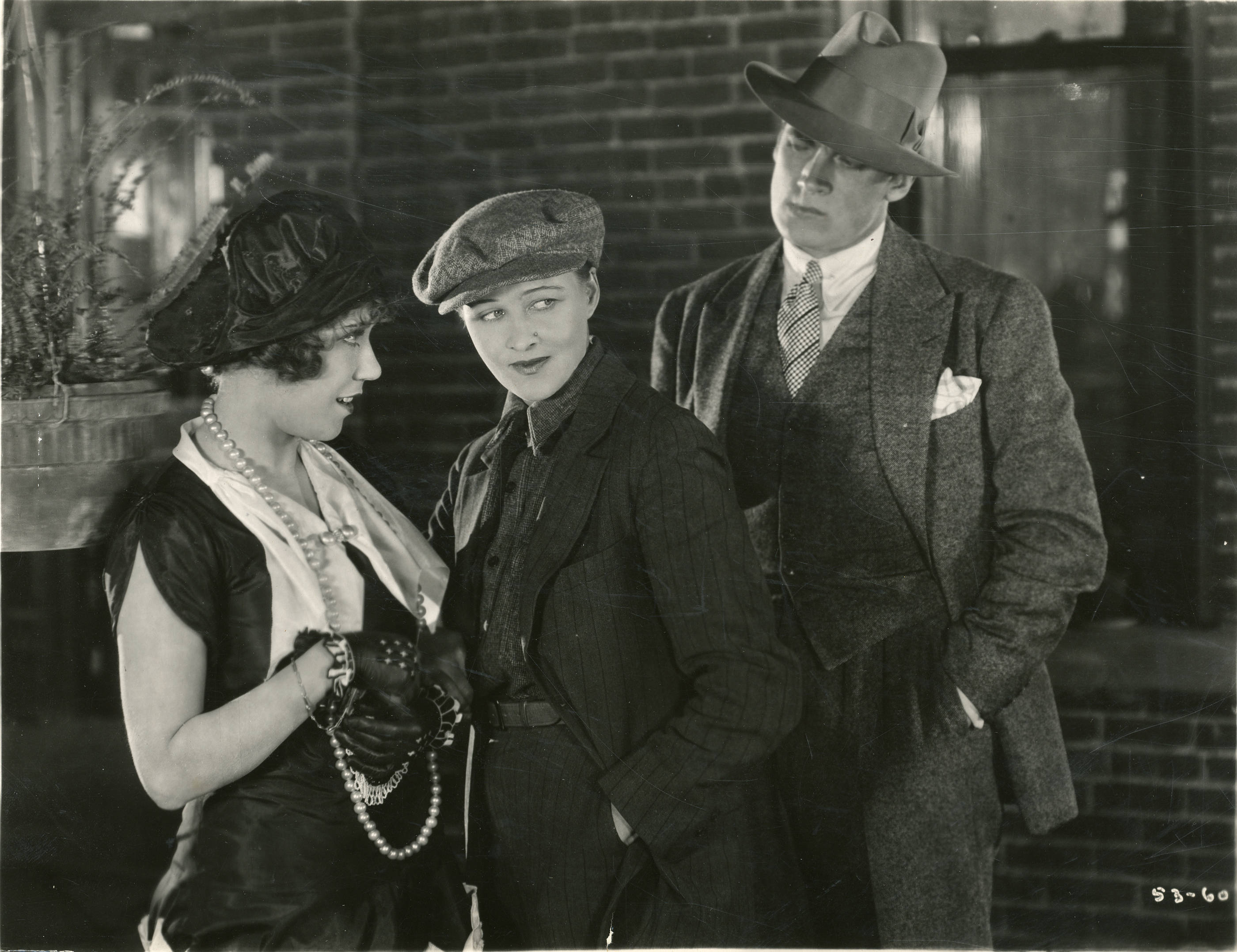
Still with Anna Q. Nilsson in male clothing

== Cast ==
- Anna Q. Nilsson as Barbara Brown
- Walter Pidgeon as Bravo
- Louise Fazenda as Mazie Raleigh
- Mitchell Lewis as Harmony
- Clyde Cook as Bertie
- Arthur Stone as Happy
- Anders Randolf as J.B. Hardiman
- Claire Du Brey as Ann Adams
- Jed Prouty as The Farmer
- Caroline Rankin as His Wife
- George Nichols as The Sheriff
- Elita Proctor Otis as Miriam Arnold (credited as Oleta Otis)
- James Gordon as Police Sergeant
- Fred Warren as Barker

== Preservation ==
This film appears to now be a lost film. Two other silent films titled Miss Nobody from 1917 (starring Gladys Hulette) and 1920 (starring Billie Rhodes) are preserved in the film collection of the Library of Congress.
