= A Sailor's Sweetheart =

1927 film

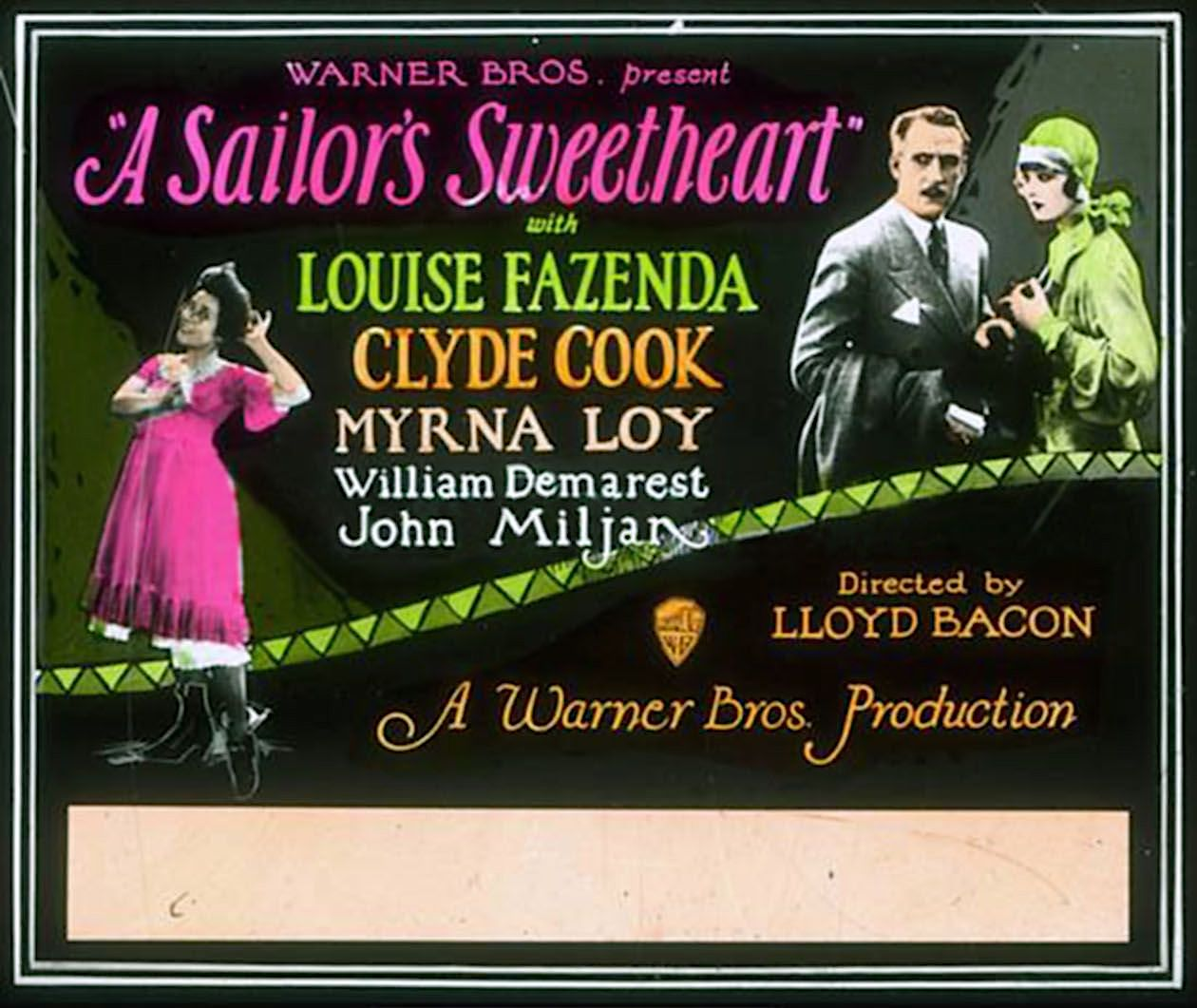
- Lantern slide
- Directed by: Lloyd Bacon
- Screenplay by: John Farrow
- Starring: Louise Fazenda; Myrna Loy; Clyde Cook
- Cinematography: Frank Kesson
- Production company: Warner Bros.
- Distributed by: Warner Bros.
- Release date: September 24, 1927
- Running time: 60 minutes
- Country: United States
- Languages: Sound (Synchronized) (English Intertitles)

A Sailor's Sweetheart is a 1927 American synchronized sound film comedy directed by Lloyd Bacon. While the film has no audible dialog, it was released with a synchronized musical score with sound effects using the Vitaphone sound-on-disc process. It stars Louise Fazenda and Clyde Cook.

== Plot ==
Cynthia Botts, a prim, lonely spinster and headmistress of an exclusive girls’ school, is stunned to learn she has inherited the estate of the recently deceased Mr. Doolittle, the school's wealthy patron. Finally believing love may be within her reach, the awkward but hopeful Cynthia sets off for Hawaii in search of moonlit romance.

Meanwhile, Professor Meekham, a pious, two-faced colleague who hoped to share in the inheritance himself, grows green with envy. Determined to claw his way back into contention, he seeks out the executor of the will in hopes of rewriting his fate.

On the day of her departure, Cynthia impulsively marries the suave Mark Krisel, a man posing as a respectable banker but in truth a professional fortune-hunter who targets wealthy, naïve women. Cynthia believes she's finally found her Prince Charming—until aboard the ship she discovers a love note addressed to her new husband from “Claudette”, his mistress. In a fit of betrayed fury, she throws Mark out a porthole and, in the chaos, tumbles through the door—colliding with Sandy MacTavish, a bumbling Scottish sailor spying through the keyhole.

Both Cynthia and Sandy are swept overboard and rescued by rum-runners, who are themselves apprehended shortly after by Prohibition agents. Handcuffed together as potential smugglers, the mismatched pair escape the authorities through quick thinking and scramble back to Cynthia's school. Still chained at the wrist, Cynthia sneaks Sandy into her apartment via a closet, and disguises him in a woman's outfit. When Professor Meekham appears, Cynthia nervously introduces Sandy as “Miss Jones,” claiming she missed her ship to Hawaii.

The charade continues into the night. Cynthia and Sandy, finding a bottle of Meekham's “liver tonic”—really just bootleg liquor—indulge together and loosen up. Cynthia slurs with affection, “What happensh to the shailorsh on a night like thish?” just as her maid Lena Svenson arrives, shocked to find her mistress drinking with a cross-dressed “lady.” Cynthia has Lena fetch a file to remove the cuffs: “Thisch guy ’shnot my husband... he’sh jus' 'nother victim of my maidenly charmsh.”

The next morning brings more complications. Meekham arrives with the Doolittle attorney to deliver a stern warning: a codicil in the will states that any scandal will nullify Cynthia's inheritance, passing the entire fortune to Professor Meekham instead.

As if things weren't tangled enough, Mark Krisel returns to claim his bride—and her money. Cynthia, now free from the handcuffs, insists that Sandy is her husband. Chaos ensues as the Prohibition agents arrive, still searching for their escaped detainees. But the tables turn: the agents recognize Mark Krisel and Claudette as wanted criminals in a marriage fraud ring. They're promptly arrested, exonerating Cynthia and Sandy.

With her name cleared, Cynthia proudly introduces Sandy as her future husband.

== Cast ==
- Louise Fazenda as Cynthia Botts
- Clyde Cook as Sandy MacTavish
- Myrna Loy as Claudette Ralston
- William Demarest as Detective
- John Miljan as Mark Krisel
- Dorothea Wolbert as Lena Svenson
- Tom Ricketts as Professor Meekham

== Preservation ==
An incomplete print exists in England at the British Film Institute (BFI)/National Film and Television Archive, London.

== See also ==
- List of early sound feature films (1926–1929)
- List of early Warner Bros. sound and talking features
