= William Demarest =

American actor (1892–1983)

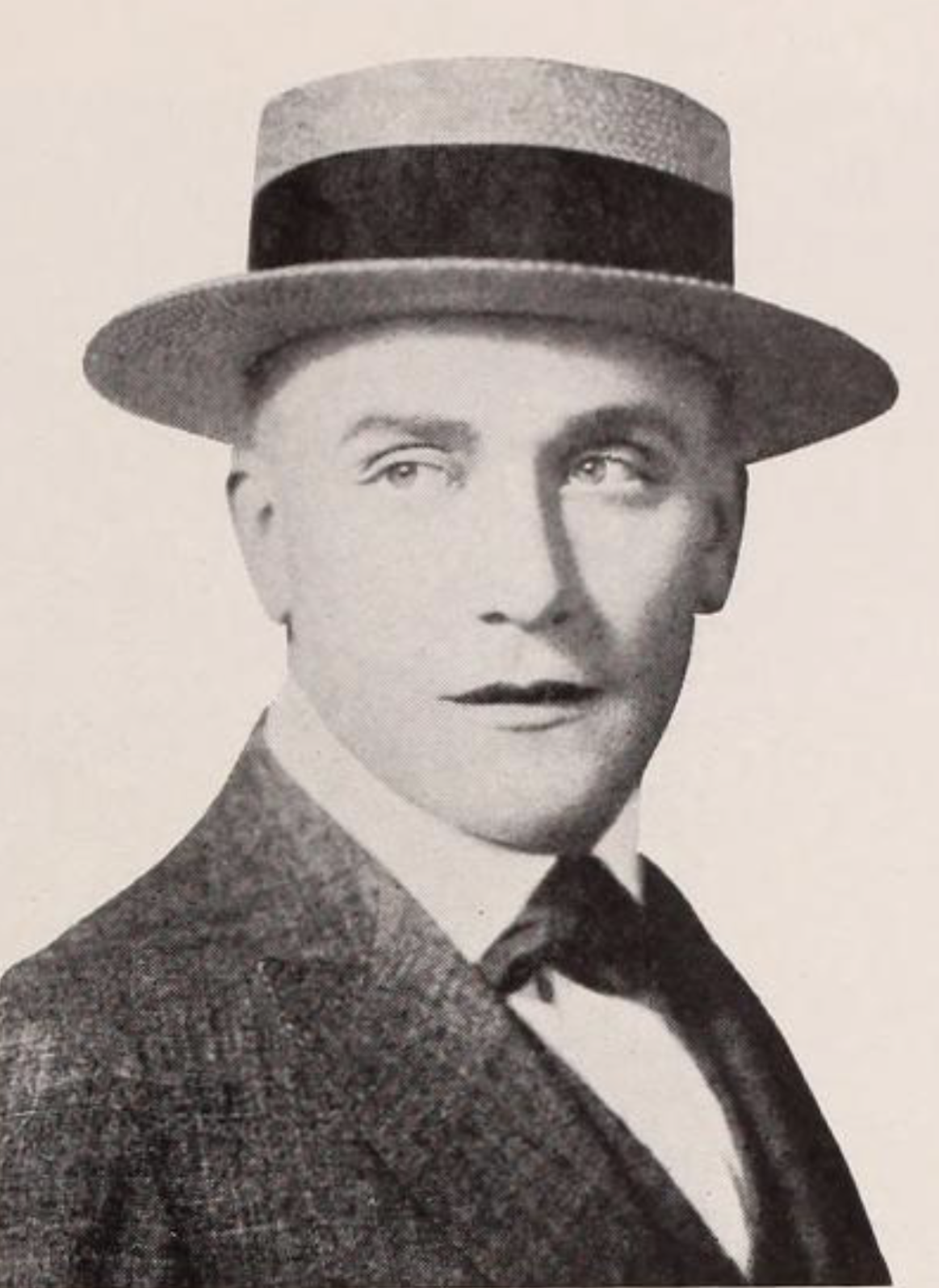
- 1923 photograph of William Demarest
- Born: Carl William Demarest; February 27, 1892; Saint Paul, Minnesota, U.S.
- Died: December 28, 1983 (aged 91); Palm Springs, California, U.S.
- Resting place: Forest Lawn Memorial Park, Glendale, California
- Occupation: Actor
- Years active: 1920–1978
- Spouses: Estelle Collette (m. 1923; div. 1941) (died 1968) Lucille Thayer (m. 1942) (died 2009)

Carl William Demarest (February 27, 1892 – December 28, 1983) was an American actor, known especially for his supporting roles in screwball comedies by Preston Sturges and as Uncle Charley in the sitcom My Three Sons from 1965 until 1972. Demarest, who frequently played crusty but good-hearted roles, was a prolific film and television actor, appearing in over 140 films, beginning in 1926 and ending in the late 1970s. Before his career in movies, he performed in vaudeville for two decades.

== Early life ==
Carl William Demarest was born in Saint Paul, Minnesota, the youngest of three sons of Wilhelmina (née Lindgren) and Samuel Demarest. During William's infancy, the family moved to New Bridge, a hamlet in Bergen County, New Jersey. He served in the U.S. Army during World War I.

== Career ==
Demarest began his career performing in Vaudeville, in his youth with his two older brothers and later with his wife Estelle Collette (born Esther Zichlin) as "Demarest and Colette". He then moved to Broadway, and by 1926 had moved into films. By the 1940s he was a member of director Preston Sturges' informal troupe of character actors, appearing in 10 films written by Sturges, many of them screwball comedies, and eight films in all under Sturges' direction. Among these he had prominent roles in The Lady Eve, Sullivan's Travels, Hail the Conquering Hero, and The Miracle of Morgan's Creek. Demarest was such a familiar figure at the Paramount studio that just his name was used in the 1950 movie Sunset Boulevard as a potential star for William Holden's unsold baseball screenplay.

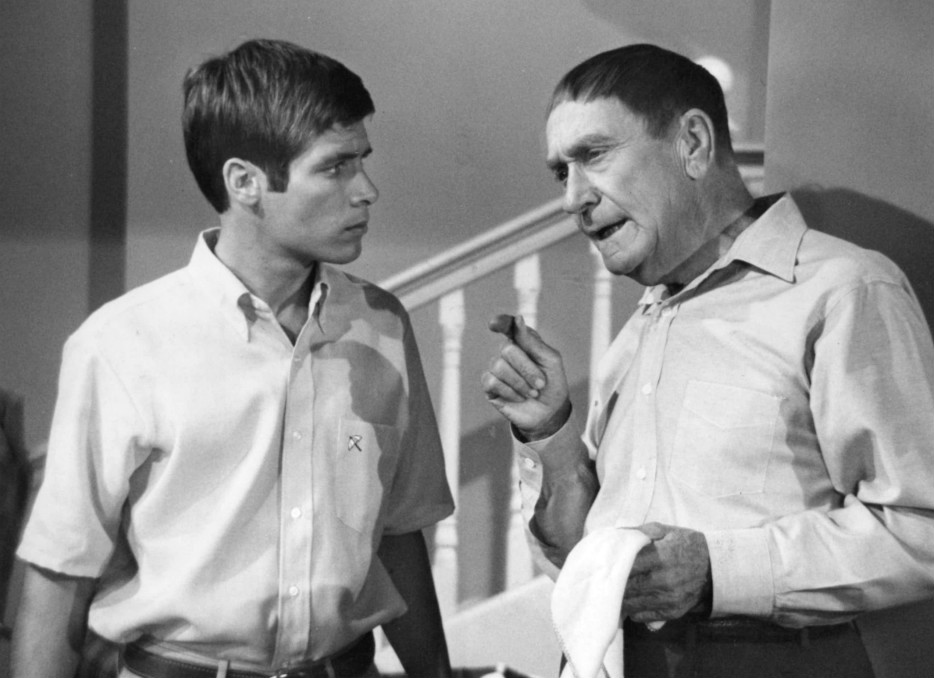
Demarest with Don Grady in My Three Sons (1969)

In 1951 Demarest had a featured role in The Strip opposite Mickey Rooney as a philosophic nightclub owner and pianist fronting for a band composed of Louis Armstrong, Jack Teagarden, Barney Bigard, Earl "Fatha" Hines, and Rooney himself on drums.

He played folksy Jeb Gaine, an occasional sidekick to the main character, in the 1961–62 season of the Western series Tales of Wells Fargo.

Demarest appeared as Police Chief Aloysius of the Santa Rosita Police Department in the film It's a Mad, Mad, Mad, Mad World (1963) and in 1964 he co-starred in an episode originally aired in the final season of The Twilight Zone ("What's in the Box"), portraying a hen-pecked husband who murders his wife, played by Joan Blondell. Several years later, Blondell and Demarest reunited on an episode of My Three Sons.

His most famous television role was in the sitcom My Three Sons from 1965 to 1972, playing Uncle Charley O'Casey. He replaced William Frawley, who was in failing health. Demarest had worked with series star Fred MacMurray previously in the films Hands Across the Table (1935), Pardon My Past (1945), On Our Merry Way (1948), and The Far Horizons (1955), and was a personal friend.

== Personal life ==
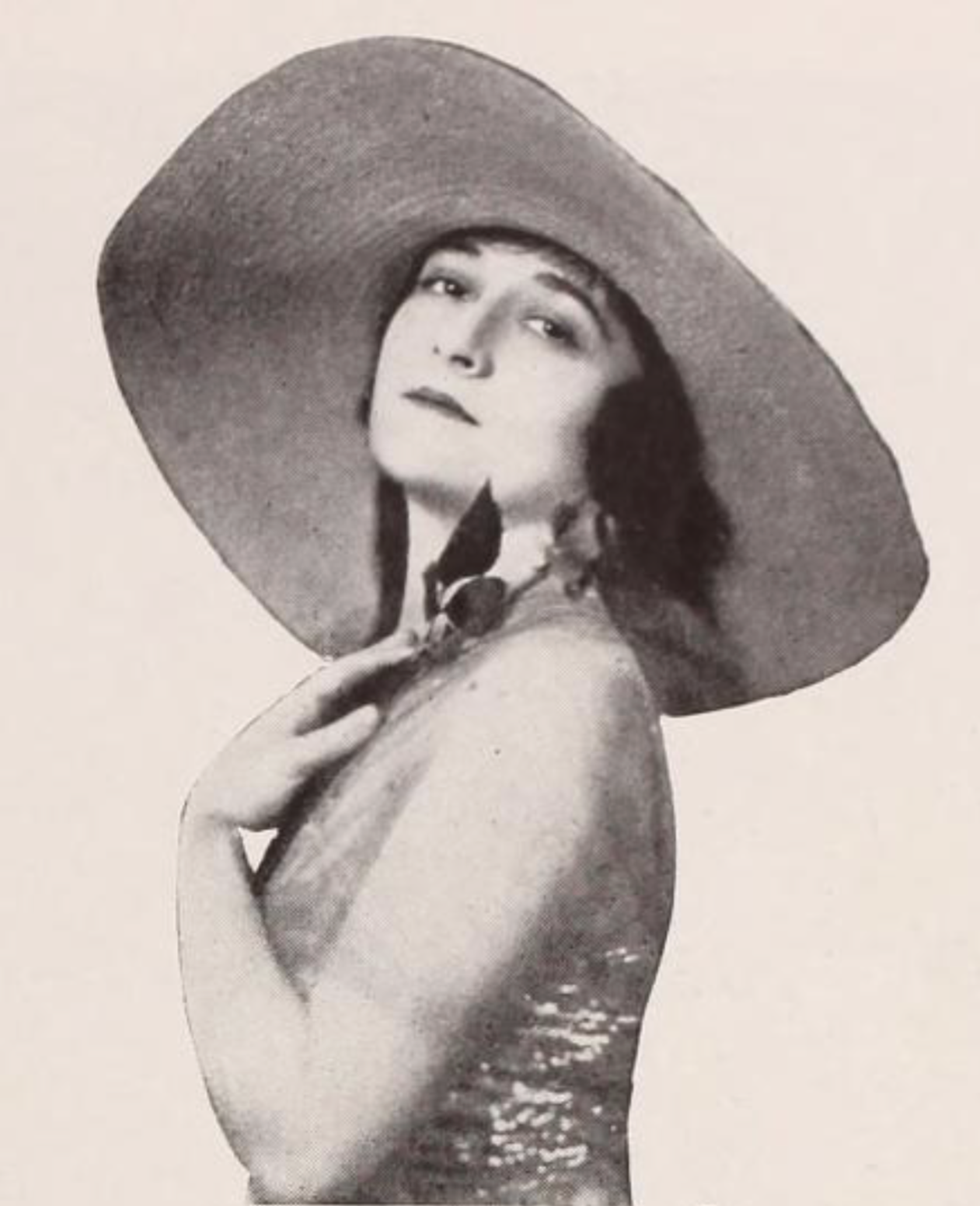
Demarest's first wife, Estelle Collette

Demarest was married twice. His first wife was his vaudeville partner Estelle Collette, born Esther Zichlin. Demarest helped raise her daughter, author Phyllis Gordon Demarest, from her earlier marriage, in 1907, to English poet and novelist Samuel Gordon, who had divorced Zichlin before his death. Demarest's second wife was Lucille Thayer, born Lucille Theurer, whom he married in Prescott, Arizona, on August 31, 1942. Thayer, who later became an activist on health issues in the motion picture industry, was appointed California's lay-chairman of the American Nurses Association in October 1960.

== Death ==
Demarest died at his home in Palm Springs, California on December 28, 1983, and his body is interred at Forest Lawn Memorial Park in Glendale, California.

== Awards and recognition ==
Demarest received a single Academy Award nomination for his supporting role in The Jolson Story (1946), playing Al Jolson's fictional mentor. He shared the screen with the real Al Jolson in The Jazz Singer.

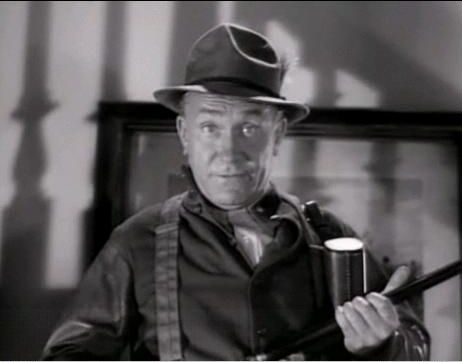
Demarest in The Palm Beach Story (1942)

Demarest also received an Emmy nomination for the 1968–1969 season of My Three Sons as Best Supporting Actor in a Comedy Role.

Demarest has a star on the Hollywood Walk of Fame for his contributions to motion pictures, bestowed upon him on August 8, 1979, by the Hollywood Chamber of Commerce. In attendance at the ceremony and then later at Musso & Frank Grill for celebrations were his My Three Sons co-stars Fred MacMurray and his wife June Haver, Tina Cole, Stanley Livingston, Barry Livingston, and Dawn Lyn.

In 1998, a Golden Palm Star on the Palm Springs Walk of Stars was dedicated to him.

== Partial filmography ==
=== Features ===
- When the Wife's Away (1926)
- Finger Prints (1927) as Cuffs Egan
- Don't Tell the Wife (1927) as Ray Valerian
- The Gay Old Bird (1927) as Mr. Fixit
- Matinee Ladies (1927) as Man-About-Town
- A Million Bid (1927) as George Lamont
- Simple Sis (1927) as Oscar
- The Black Diamond Express (1927) as Fireman
- What Happened to Father? (1927) as Detective Dibbin
- The First Auto (1927) as The Village Cut-Up
- The Bush Leaguer (1927) as John Gilroy
- A Sailor's Sweetheart (1927) as Detective
- The Jazz Singer (1927) as Buster Billings (uncredited)
- A Reno Divorce (1927) as James, the chauffeur
- Sharp Shooters (1928) as 'Hi Jack' Murdock
- A Girl in Every Port (1928) as Man in Bombay (uncredited)
- The Escape (1928) as Trigger Caswell
- Pay as You Enter (1928) as 'Terrible Bill' McGovern
- Five and Ten Cent Annie (1928) as Briggs
- The Butter and Egg Man (1928) as Jack McLure
- The Crash (1928) as Louie
- Fog Over Frisco (1934) as Spike Smith
- Many Happy Returns (1934) as Brinker
- The Circus Clown (1934) (scenes deleted)
- Fugitive Lady (1934) as Steve Rogers
- After Office Hours (1935) as Police Detective (uncredited)
- The Casino Murder Case (1935) as Auctioneer (uncredited)
- The Murder Man (1935) as 'Red' Maguire
- Bright Lights (1935) as Detective
- Diamond Jim (1935) as Harry Hill
- Hands Across the Table (1935) as Natty (uncredited)
- White Lies (1935) as Roberts
- The Great Ziegfeld (1936) as Gene Buck (uncredited)
- Wedding Present (1936) as 'Smiles' Benson
- Love on the Run (1936) as Editor Lees Berger
- Charlie Chan at the Opera (1936) as Sergeant Kelly
- Mind Your Own Business (1936) as Droopy
- Time Out for Romance (1937) as Willoughby Sproggs
- Don't Tell the Wife (1937) as Larry 'Horace' Tucker
- Oh, Doctor (1937) as Marty Short
- The Hit Parade (1937) as Parole Officer
- The Great Hospital Mystery (1937) as Mr. Beatty
- The Great Gambini (1937) as Sergeant Kirby
- Easy Living (1937) as Wallace Whistling
- Blonde Trouble (1937) as Paul Sears
- Wake Up and Live (1937) as Radio Station Attendant
- Big City (1937) as Beecher
- Rosalie (1937) as Army Coach
- Rebecca of Sunnybrook Farm (1938) as Henry Kipper
- Romance on the Run (1938) as Police Lieutenant Eckhardt
- One Wild Night (1938) as Editor Collins
- Josette (1938) as Joe, Diner Owner
- Peck's Bad Boy with the Circus (1938) as Daro
- While New York Sleeps (1938) as Red Miller
- The Great Man Votes (1939) as Charles Dale
- King of the Turf (1939) as Arnold
- The Gracie Allen Murder Case (1939) as Police Sergeant Ernest Heath
- The Cowboy Quarterback (1939) as Rusty Walker
- Miracles for Sale (1939) as Quinn
- Mr. Smith Goes to Washington (1939) as Bill Griffith
- Laugh It Off (1939) as Barney 'Gimpy' Cole
- Wolf of New York (1940) as Bill Ennis
- The Farmer's Daughter (1940) as Victor Walsh
- The Great McGinty (1940) as Skeeters – The Politician
- Comin' Round the Mountain (1940) as Gutsy Mann
- The Golden Fleecing (1940) as Swallow
- Christmas in July (1940) as Mr. Bildocker
- Little Men (1940) as Constable Tom Thorpe
- The Lady Eve (1941) as Muggsy
- The Devil and Miss Jones (1941) as First Detective
- Rookies on Parade (1941) as Mike Brady
- Ride on Vaquero (1941) as Bartender Barney
- Country Fair (1941) as Stogie McPhee
- Dressed to Kill (1941) as Inspector Pierson
- All Through the Night (1941) as Sunshine
- Sullivan's Travels (1941) as Mr. Jonas
- Glamour Boy (1941) as Papa Doran
- True to the Army (1942) as Sergeant Butts
- My Favorite Spy (1942) as Flower Pot Policeman
- Pardon My Sarong (1942) as Detective Kendall
- The Palm Beach Story (1942) as First Member Ale and Quail Club
- Behind the Eight Ball (1942) as McKenzie
- Life Begins at Eight-Thirty (1942) as Police Officer
- Johnny Doughboy (1942) as Harry Fabian
- Stage Door Canteen (1943) as William Demarest
- Dangerous Blondes (1943) as Detective Gatling
- True to Life (1943) as Uncle Jake
- The Miracle of Morgan's Creek (1944) as Constable Edmund Kockenlocker
- Nine Girls (1944) as Walter Cummings
- Once Upon a Time (1944) as Brandt
- Hail the Conquering Hero (1944) as Sergeant Heffelfinger
- The Great Moment (1944) as Eben Frost
- Salty O'Rourke (1945) as Smitty
- Along Came Jones (1945) as George Fury
- Duffy's Tavern (1945) as Himself
- Pardon My Past (1945) as Chuck Gibson
- Our Hearts Were Growing Up (1946) as Peanuts Schultz
- The Jolson Story (1946) as Steve Martin
- The Perils of Pauline (1947) as George 'Mac' McGuire
- Variety Girl (1947) as Barker
- On Our Merry Way (1948) as Floyd
- The Sainted Sisters (1948) as Vern Tewilliger
- Night Has a Thousand Eyes (1948) as Lieutenant Shawn
- Whispering Smith (1948) as Bill Dansing
- Sorrowful Jones (1949) as Regret
- Jolson Sings Again (1949) as Steve Martin
- Red, Hot and Blue (1949) as Charlie Baxter, Press Agent
- When Willie Comes Marching Home (1950) as Herman Kluggs
- Riding High (1950) as Happy
- Never a Dull Moment (1950) as Mears
- He's a Cockeyed Wonder (1950) as Bob Sears
- The First Legion (1951) as Monsignor Michael Carey
- Excuse My Dust (1951) as Harvey Bullitt
- The Strip (1951) as Fluff
- Behave Yourself! (1951) as Officer O'Ryan
- What Price Glory (1952) as Corporal Kiper
- The Blazing Forest (1952) as Syd Jessup
- The Lady Wants Mink (1953) as Harvey Jones
- Dangerous When Wet (1953) as Pa Higgins
- Here Come the Girls (1953) as Dennis Logan
- Escape from Fort Bravo (1953) as Campbell
- The Yellow Mountain (1954) as Jackpot Wray
- Jupiter's Darling (1955) as Mago
- The Far Horizons (1955) as Sergeant Gass
- The Private War of Major Benson (1955) as John
- Lucy Gallant (1955) as Charles Madden
- Sincerely Yours (1955) as Sam Dunne
- Hell on Frisco Bay (1956) as Dan Bianco
- The Rawhide Years (1956) as Brand Comfort
- The Mountain (1956) as Father Belacchi
- Pepe (1960) as Movie Studio Gateman
- The Big Bankroll (1961) as Henry Hecht
- Twenty Plus Two (1961) as Desmond Slocum
- Son of Flubber (1963) as Mr. Hummel
- It's a Mad, Mad, Mad, Mad World (1963) as Aloysius, Chief of the Santa Rosita Police Department
- Viva Las Vegas (1964) as Mr. Martin
- That Darn Cat (1965) as Mr. MacDougall
- Don't Be Afraid Of The Dark (1973) as Mr. Harris
- The Wild McCullochs (1975) as Father Gurkin
- Won Ton Ton, the Dog Who Saved Hollywood (1976) as Studio Gatekeeper

=== Short subjects ===
- A Night at Coffee Dan's (1927) as M.C.
- Amateur Night (1927) as Theatre Manager
- The Night Court (1927) as Defense Counsel (uncredited)
- Seeing Things (1930)
- The Run Around (1932)

=== Television ===
- The Danny Thomas Show in 5 episodes (1957–1958) as Mr. Daly
- Alfred Hitchcock Presents (1958) in Season 4 Episode 11: "And the Desert Shall Blossom" as Tom Akins
- The Rebel in "The Hope Chest" (1960) as Ulysses Bowman
- Love and Marriage (1959–1960) as William Harris
- Tales of Wells Fargo (1961–1962) as Jeb Gaine
- Wagon Train in Season 4 Episode 25 (1961) "The Christopher Hale Story"
- Going My Way in "The Slasher" (1963) as Marty
- Bonanza in the episode "The Hayburner" (1963) as Enos Milford
- Bonanza in the episode "Old Sheba" (1964) as Angus Tweedy
- The Twilight Zone in Season 5 Episode 24 (1964) "What's in the Box" as Joe Britt
- My Three Sons (215 episodes, 1965–1972) as Uncle Charley O'Casey
- McMillan and Wife [Two Dollars on Trouble to Win] S2/Ep07 (1973) as Uncle Cyrus, [Deadly Inheritance] S5/E01 (1975) as Andy Kenesaw

== Radio appearances ==
Year	Program	Episode/source
1940	Stars over Hollywood	The Town Constable
