= Maggie's First False Step =

- Release date: 1917
- Country: United States
- Language: Silent (English intertitles)

Maggie's First False Step is a 1917 short film directed by Frank Griffin and Mack Sennett, and starring Charles Murray, Louise Fazenda and Wallace Beery. The short was produced by Sennett at the Keystone Film Company and distributed by Triangle Distributing. The supporting cast features Alice Davenport and Mary Thurman.

== Cast ==
Charles Murray... The Floorwalker
Louise Fazenda ... Maggie - the Country Girl
Wallace Beery ... The Villain
Harry Booker ... Maggie's Father
Alice Davenport ... Maggie's Mother
Mary Thurman
