= Wife Tamers =

1926 film

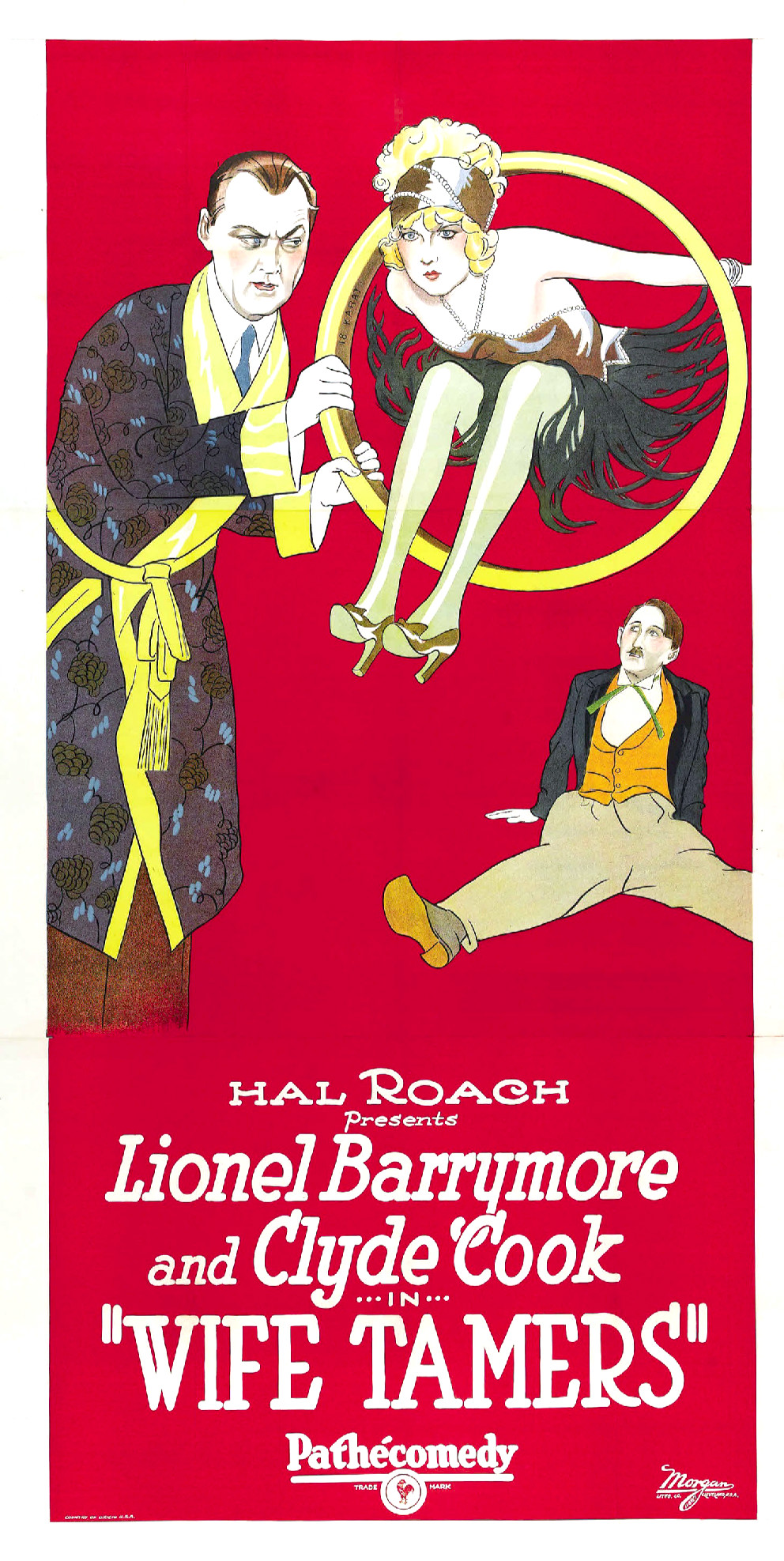
- Film poster
- Directed by: James W. Horne
- Written by: Carl Harbaugh; Grover Jones; Stan Laurel; Hal Yates
- Produced by: Hal Roach
- Starring: Lionel Barrymore; Clyde Cook; Gertrude Astor
- Cinematography: Len Powers
- Distributed by: Pathé Exchange
- Release date: March 28, 1926
- Running time: 20 minutes
- Country: United States
- Language: Silent (English intertitles)

Wife Tamers is a 1926 American silent short comedy film directed by James W. Horne and produced by Hal Roach. It stars Lionel Barrymore, Clyde Cook, and Gertrude Astor. It was distributed by Pathé Exchange.

== Cast ==
- Lionel Barrymore as Mr. Barry
- Clyde Cook as The Butler
- Gertrude Astor as Mrs. Barry
- Vivien Oakland as The Other Woman
- James Finlayson as The Waiter
- John T. Murray as A Friend

== Preservation ==
Prints of Wife Tamers survive at UCLA Film & Television Archive and Loose Than Loose Publishing.

== See also ==
- Lionel Barrymore filmography
- Gertrude Astor filmography
