= Vivien Oakland =

American actress (1895–1958)

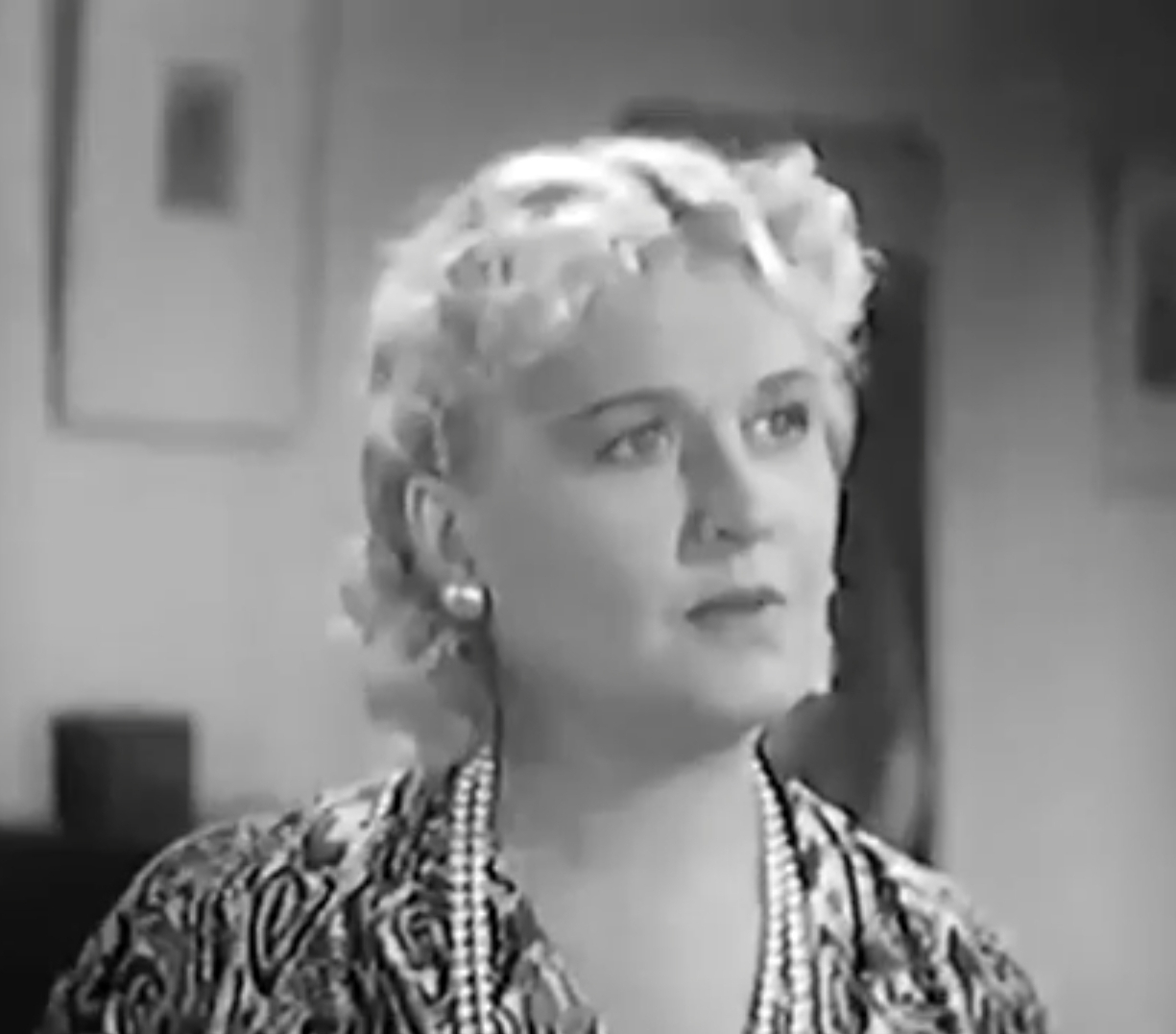
- Oakland in Amateur Crook (1937)
- Born: Vivian Ruth Andersen; May 20, 1895; San Francisco, California, U.S.
- Died: August 1, 1958 (aged 63); Hollywood, California, U.S.
- Resting place: Chapel of the Pines Crematory
- Other names: Vivian Oakland; Vivienne Oakland
- Occupation: Actress
- Years active: 1915–1951
- Spouse(s): John T. Murray (m. 19??; died 1957)

Vivien Oakland (born Vivian Ruth Andersen; May 20, 1895 – August 1, 1958), was an American actress best known for her work in comedies in Hollywood in the 1920s and 1930s, most notably with the Hal Roach Studios. Oakland appeared in 157 films between 1915 and 1951.

== Family ==
Born Vivian Ruth Andersen in San Francisco, California, she was the daughter of Norwegian immigrants Edward Andersen and Anna Marthine Olsen. Her siblings' names were Edward, Herbert (née Hagbart), and Edna. She was one half of the vaudeville team "The Oakland Sisters" with her younger sister Edna, who later performed in motion pictures as Dagmar Oakland. After the 1906 San Francisco earthquake, Anna Andersen, a widow since 1898, moved the family to Oakland, California. In 1917, Vivien married actor John T. Murray (1886–1957). Oakland performed on Broadway and with the Ziegfeld Follies.

== Career ==
She supported Laurel and Hardy on several occasions, and sometimes played the wife of Edgar Kennedy and Leon Errol in their series of short films. She played mostly bit roles in feature films in the 1940s before making her last film, an Errol comedy, in 1951. She retired from acting in 1951, settling in Sherman Oaks, California. She died seven years later and was buried in Chapel of the Pines Crematory.

== Partial filmography ==
- Destiny (1915)
- Madonna of the Streets (1924)
- The Rainbow Trail (1925)
- The Teaser (1925)
- Wife Tamers (1926)
- Tony Runs Wild (1926)
- Along Came Auntie (1926)
- Mighty Like a Moose (1926)
- Say It with Babies (1926)
- Redheads Preferred (1926)
- Two-Time Mama (1927)
- Love 'em and Weep (1927)
- Uncle Tom's Cabin (1927)
- Wedding Bills (1927)
- We Faw Down (1928)
- The Man in Hobbles (1928)
- That's My Wife (1929)
- The Time, the Place and the Girl (1929)
- In the Headlines (1929)
- Personality (1930)
- The Florodora Girl (1930)
- Back Pay (1930)
- The Matrimonial Bed (1930)
- Oh Sailor Behave (1930)
- A Lady Surrenders (1930)
- Many a Slip (1931)
- Gold Dust Gertie (1931)
- A House Divided (1931)
- The Age for Love (1931)
- Cock of the Air (1932)
- The Tenderfoot (1932)
- Secrets of the French Police (1932)
- Scram! (1932)
- They Just Had to Get Married (1932)
- Neighbors' Wives (1933)
- Merry Wives of Reno (1934)
- The Defense Rests (1934)
- Money Means Nothing (1934)
- Rendezvous at Midnight (1935)
- Star of Midnight (1935)
- Keystone Hotel (1935)
- Lady Luck (1936)
- Way Out West (1937)
- Should Wives Work? (1937)
- Amateur Crook (1937)
- Double Danger (1938)
- Rebellious Daughters (1938)
- Slander House (1938)
- A Chump at Oxford (1940)
- Pop Always Pays (1940)
- The Man in the Trunk (1942)
- Laugh Your Blues Away (1942)
- The Girl Who Dared (1944)
- The Man Who Walked Alone (1945)
- Utah (1945)
- Night and Day (1946)
- Bunco Squad (1950)
- Punchy Pancho (1951)
