= Finger Prints (film) =

1927 film by Lloyd Bacon

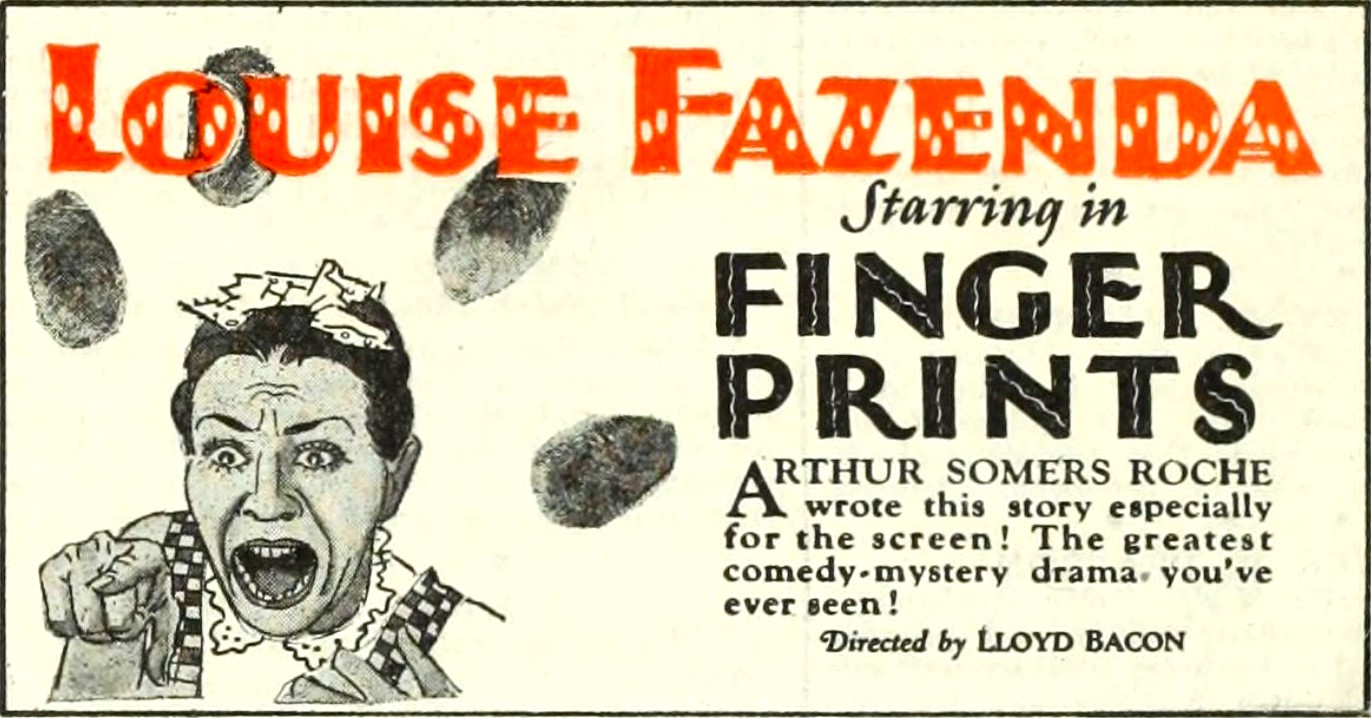
- Advertisement
- Directed by: Lloyd Bacon
- Written by: C. Graham Baker; Edward Clark; Arthur Somers Roche
- Starring: Louise Fazenda; John T. Murray; Helene Costello
- Cinematography: Virgil Miller
- Production company: Warner Bros.
- Release date: January 8, 1927
- Running time: 70 minutes
- Country: United States
- Language: Silent (English intertitles)

Finger Prints is a 1927 American silent comedy crime film directed by Lloyd Bacon and starring Louise Fazenda, John T. Murray, and Helene Costello.

== Cast ==
- Louise Fazenda as Dora Traynor
- John T. Murray as Homer Fairchild
- Helene Costello as Jacqueline Norton
- Myrna Loy as Vamp
- George Nichols as S.V. Sweeney
- Martha Mattox as Mother Malone
- Franklin Pangborn as The Bandoline Kid
- William Demarest as Cuffs Egan
- Bob Perry as Hard-Boiled Ryan
- Edgar Kennedy as O.K. McDuff
- Jerry Miley as Chicago Ed
- Joseph B. Stone as Cabbage Head McCarthy
- Warner Richmond as 'Annie Laurie' Andy Norton
- Lew Harvey as Secret Service Man
- William Desmond

== Preservation ==
With no prints of Finger Prints located in any film archives, it is a lost film. It is referenced in the dialogue of Hitchcock's 1929 film Blackmail, in which a detective says he wants to see the picture, though he expects the details to be wrong. His girlfriend disagrees, saying, "I hear they got a real criminal to direct it. Just to be on the safe side." However, the director, Lloyd Bacon, who had a long and distinguished career, did not have any known criminal record.
