= Pay as You Enter =

1928 film

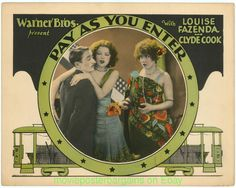
- Lobby card
- Directed by: Lloyd Bacon
- Written by: Joseph Jackson; Fred Stanley; Darryl F. Zanuck
- Starring: Louise Fazenda; Clyde Cook; William Demarest
- Cinematography: Norbert Brodine
- Production company: Warner Bros.
- Distributed by: Warner Bros.
- Release date: May 12, 1928
- Running time: 55 minutes
- Country: United States
- Languages: Sound (Synchronized) (English Intertitles)
- Budget: $83,000
- Box office: $139,000

Pay as You Enter is a 1928 American synchronized sound comedy film directed by Lloyd Bacon and starring Louise Fazenda, Clyde Cook, and William Demarest. While the film has no audible dialog, it was released with a synchronized musical score with sound effects using the sound-on-disc Vitaphone process. The title refers to the fare collection system used on a streetcar.

== Plot ==
Mary Smith is a cheerful waitress working in a bustling quick-lunch wagon. She harbors a secret love for “Terrible Bill” McGovern, the rough-and-tumble conductor, who, unfortunately for Mary, is busy courting the gold-digging Yvonne De Russo. Meanwhile, Clyde Jones, the shy motorman on the same streetcar, secretly adores Mary but lacks the courage to openly woo her.

After losing a fight and the favor of Yvonne, Terrible Bill faces another blow when one of Yvonne's admirers, defeated by Bill, informs Mary that she has unexpectedly inherited a fortune. Though the fortune never appears, fate soon smiles on Mary when she is struck by a society woman's car and awarded $1,000 in damages.

Seizing the opportunity to win Yvonne back, Bill pretends to court Mary, hoping to get hold of her money. He takes her to the carmen's ball, where Clyde arrives with Yvonne in tow. Bill rudely shoves Clyde aside and plots with Yvonne to steal Mary's settlement.

The night takes a wild turn when Bill elopes with Mary on a streetcar, but Clyde intervenes, engaging Bill in a fierce fight. The chaotic battle sends the streetcar careening out of control. Eventually, the car is brought to a stop, and Mary throws herself into Clyde's arms, grateful after he miraculously defeats Terrible Bill. Thus ends the comical and heartfelt romance unfolding in the car barns.

== Cast ==
- Louise Fazenda as Mary Smith
- Clyde Cook as Clyde Jones
- William Demarest as 'Terrible Bill' McGovern
- Myrna Loy as Yvonne De Russo

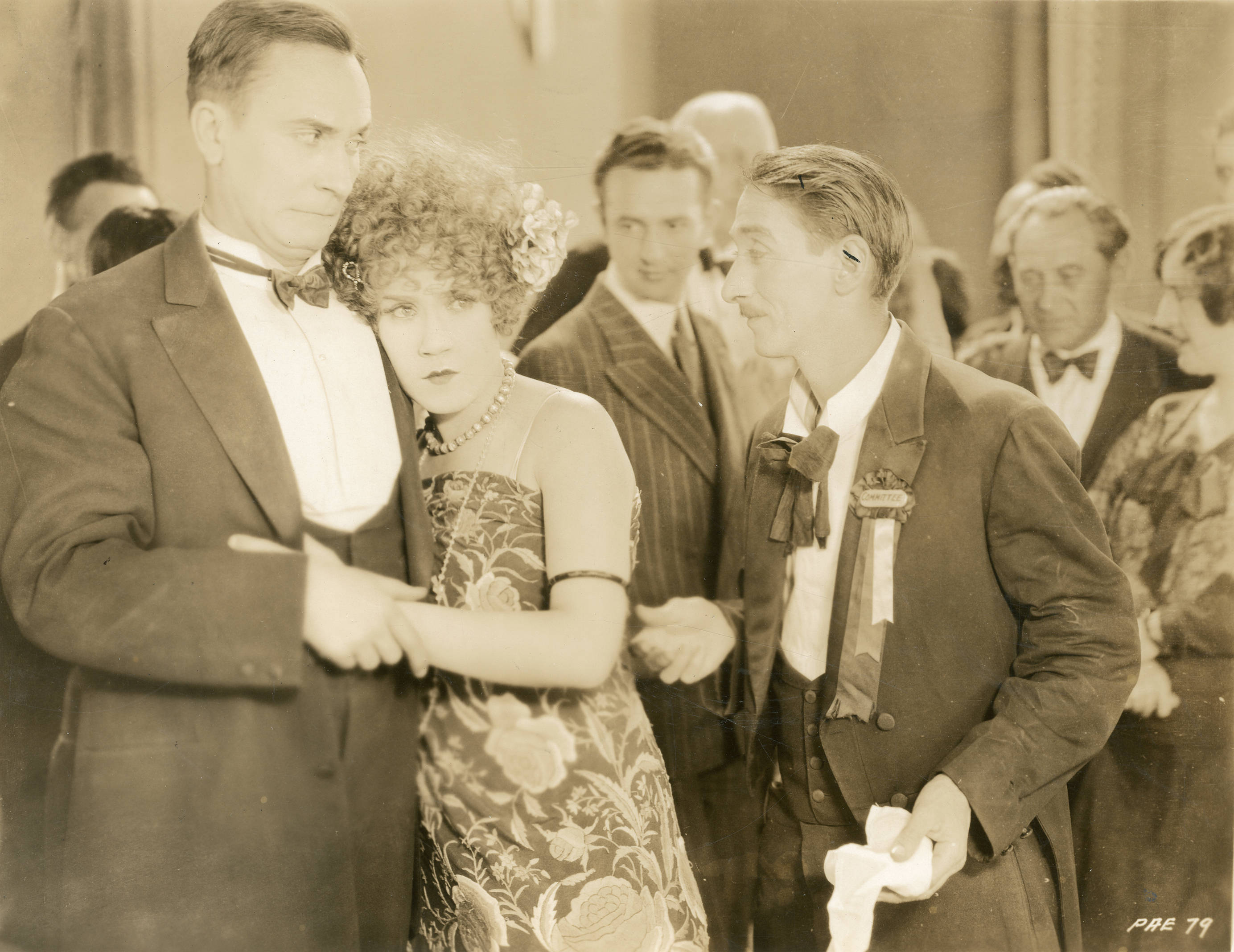
Still with Demarest, Fazenda, and Cook

== Box office ==
According to Warner Bros records the film earned $101,000 domestic and $38,000 foreign.

== Preservation ==
Pay as You Enter is a lost film.

== See also ==
- List of early sound feature films (1926–1929)
