= Five and Ten Cent Annie =

1928 film by Roy Del Ruth

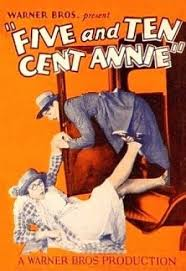
- theatrical release poster
- Directed by: Roy Del Ruth
- Written by: Charles R. Condon; Joseph Jackson; Robert Lord; Jack L. Warner
- Starring: Louise Fazenda; Clyde Cook; William Demarest
- Cinematography: Norbert Brodine
- Edited by: Ralph Dawson
- Production company: Warner Bros. Pictures
- Distributed by: Warner Bros. Pictures
- Release date: May 28, 1928
- Running time: 60 minutes
- Country: United States
- Languages: Sound (Part-Talkie); English Intertitles

Five and Ten Cent Annie is a 1928 American sound part-talkie comedy film directed by Roy Del Ruth and starring Louise Fazenda, Clyde Cook and William Demarest. In addition to sequences with audible dialogue or talking sequences, the film features a synchronized musical score and sound effects along with English intertitles. The soundtrack was recorded using the Vitaphone sound-on-disc system.

== Plot ==
Annie, a spunky salesgirl at the local five-and-dime store, dreams of excitement beyond the counter. She shares a sweet affection with Elmer Peck, a shy but earnest street cleaner who secretly adores her. Elmer's mundane life takes a dramatic turn when he inherits a large fortune from his eccentric Uncle Adam.

Unbeknownst to Elmer, the inheritance comes with a peculiar clause: if Elmer dies without marrying, the entire fortune reverts to Briggs, his uncle's seemingly loyal servant. Briggs, however, is far from faithful. Determined to claim the money for himself, the scheming valet begins a campaign of sabotage, planting traps and staging accidents to discredit or endanger Elmer. He even brings in a wild cast of accomplices—including a gold-digging blonde vamp, a midget disguised as a baby, and a bungling gang of burlesque bandits—to make Elmer's life a nonstop circus.

As Elmer's fortunes rise, so do the stakes. After multiple attempts to derail a romance between Elmer and Annie, Briggs hatches his boldest plan yet: he shanghais Elmer and puts him aboard a ship, hoping to keep him away from Annie long enough to invalidate the marriage clause. But Annie, clever and courageous, disguises herself as a crewman and sneaks aboard the ship.

Just as Briggs prepares to dispose of Elmer for good, Annie signals the Coast Guard. A wild rescue ensues, with boats, brawls, and barrels of slapstick chaos. The Coast Guard storms the vessel and saves Elmer. Briggs is arrested, and his plot collapses in spectacular comedic fashion.

Back on land, Annie and Elmer finally marry, securing the fortune, and more importantly, each other. They walk off into a future full of laughter, far from butlers, bandits, and bogus babies.

== Cast ==
- Louise Fazenda as Annie
- Clyde Cook as Elmer Peck
- William Demarest as Briggs
- Gertrude Astor as Blonde
- Tom Ricketts as Adam Peck
- Douglas Gerrard as Judge
- George Beranger as Orchestra Leader
- Eddie Haffner as Midget
- Flora Finch as Guest
- Sunshine Hart as Guest
- Billy Franey as Guest

== Preservation ==
Only a fragment of the film is known to exist at BFI National Film and Television archive, London.

== See also ==
- List of early sound feature films (1926–1929)
- List of early Warner Bros. sound and talking features
- Paradise for Two, a lost 1927 silent about inheritance
- The Cruise of the Jasper B (1926), a very similar themed film

== Bibliography ==
- Monaco, James. The Encyclopedia of Film. Perigee Books, 1991.
