= Simple Sis =

1927 film by Herman C. Raymaker

- Directed by: Herman C. Raymaker
- Screenplay by: Albert Kenyon
- Story by: Melville Crossman (Note: One of three pseudonyms used by Darryl F. Zanuck while he was writing for Warner Bros.)
- Starring: Louise Fazenda; Clyde Cook; Myrna Loy
- Cinematography: Frank Kesson
- Production company: Warner Bros.
- Distributed by: Warner Bros.
- Release date: June 11, 1927
- Running time: 70 minutes
- Country: United States
- Language: Silent (English intertitles)
- Budget: $57,000
- Box office: $185,000

Simple Sis is a 1927 American silent comedy-melodrama directed by Herman C. Raymaker and starring Louise Fazenda as a poor, plain laundress hoping for romance, supported by Clyde Cook as a shy suitor and Myrna Loy as a cruel beauty.

No copies of Simple Sis are known to exist; it is presumed lost.

== Plot ==
Sis, a laundress, is neither beautiful nor clever, but she still wishes to attract a boyfriend. When attractive Edith Van inadvertently hides her love-letter in the wrong pocket, Sis finds it and, thinking it is for her, goes to meet the lover. The mistake is soon exposed and Edith ridicules Sis. Sis meets truck driver Jerry when he rescues her from a purse-snatcher. Because of his extreme shyness, she thinks he has no interest in her. After taking in the orphaned Buddy, Sis loses her job. Although she saves Buddy from a fire, welfare workers remove him from her care. In the end, Sis, Jerry, and Buddy are united as a family.

== Cast ==
- Louise Fazenda as Sis
- Clyde Cook as Jerry O'Grady
- Myrna Loy as Edith Van
- William Demarest as Oscar
- Billy Kent Schaefer as Buddy
- Cathleen Calhoun as Mrs. Brown, Buddy's Mother

== Release ==
Simple Sis was released June 11, 1927, the second of four Warner Bros. feature films released that month.

Variety summed up the production as "colorless" and "of negligible entertainment or box office value". The reviewer for Motion Picture News called it "hokum" and thought it came across as depressing rather than comedic. In the brief Photoplay review, audiences were warned of boredom and Fazenda was deemed "worthy of better stories".

=== Box office ===
According to Warner Bros. records, the film earned $136,000 domestically and $49,000 foreign.
