= The Bush Leaguer =

1927 film

- Lobby card
- Directed by: Howard Bretherton
- Written by: Harvey Gates (scenario)
- Story by: Charles Gordon Saxton
- Starring: Monte Blue; Leila Hyams
- Cinematography: Norbert Brodine
- Production company: Warner Bros.
- Distributed by: Warner Bros.
- Release date: August 20, 1927 (limited release)
- Running time: 7 reels
- Country: United States
- Languages: Sound (Synchronized) (English intertitles)

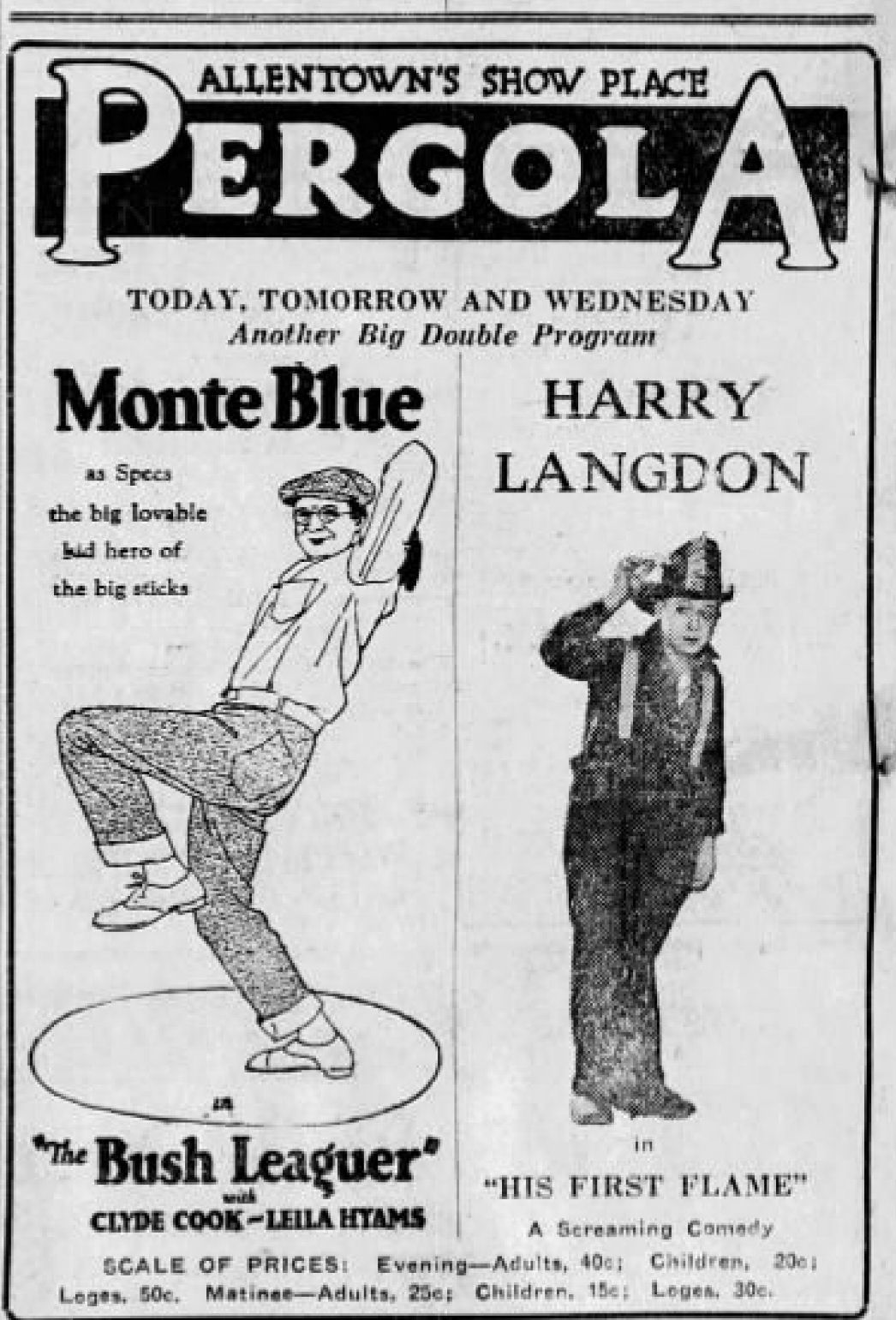
Theater advertisement for the film

The Bush Leaguer is a lost 1927 American synchronized sound comedy film directed by Howard Bretherton and starring Monte Blue and Leila Hyams. While the film has no audible dialog, it was released with a synchronized musical score with sound effects using the Vitaphone sound-on-disc process. The film was produced and distributed by the Warner Bros.

== Plot ==
In an Idaho town, garage owner Thomas Buchanan "Specs" White works on motors and develops a new type of gas pump that he believes could change the filling station industry. He also plays as an ace pitcher for the local sandlot baseball team. His life changes when a woman from Los Angeles catches his attention.

Specs' lucky break comes when “Lefty” Murphy, a scout for a Pacific Coast League club, sees him pitch and offers him a shot with the Los Angeles team. Though he never dreamed of turning pro, the promise of money to finance his invention—and perhaps another look at the mystery woman—lure him westward to the big city.

At spring training, Specs finds the game far more brutal than hometown ball. The team's wisecracking catcher Skeeter McKinnon delights in mocking him, and even tough but fair manager John Gilroy begins to suspect that his new pitcher is no more than a bush leaguer. Then fate steps in—Specs finds a photo in an old newspaper of his dream girl, captioned “Alice Hobbs, Los Angeles Belle, Returns Home.” Reenergized by hope and infatuation, Specs throws himself into his training with new determination.

The transformation is dramatic. Specs begins to shine, just in time for Gilroy, who's under pressure from Wallace Ramsey, attorney for team owner Alice Hobbs, to deliver a winning season. Specs becomes the unexpected backbone of a pennant-hungry team.

But the pressure of opening day proves too much. The crowd, the noise, the scale—it all unravels Specs. His pitching falters, and Gilroy reluctantly pulls him from the game. Humiliated, Specs walks off the field—only to lock eyes with the woman from his dreams. She is seated in the box seats, and to his shock, she smiles again. Holding up a baseball with her name and phone number scrawled on it, she tosses it toward him. But fate plays another trick—the ball rolls through the dirt and Specs retrieves it to find all that remains legible is “Alice, Main 123.”

Undeterred, Specs calls every number beginning with “Main 123” until he reaches Alice—only to discover that she is not just his dream girl, but the owner of the team. A friendship blossoms, and her faith in him helps guide Los Angeles toward the top of the league. As the final game of the season approaches, Specs' pitching has placed the team in a tie for first place.

Behind the scenes, Ramsey—fearing Specs’ influence and eyeing ownership himself—plots sabotage. He dispatches two crooked promoters, Stetson and Young, to offer Specs and Skeeter a bribe to throw the final game. Skeeter gets into a brawl with Stetson, only to be rescued by Specs. Later, Young approaches Specs alone. Unknown to them, Alice overhears the conversation. When Specs remains silent, she assumes the worst.

Game day arrives and Specs is nowhere to be found. Skeeter, now sidelined with a broken finger, can't explain the absence. What no one knows is that Specs had been summoned to a last-minute meeting with major financiers interested in backing his gas pump invention. He loses track of time.

Disillusioned, Alice fears she was right to doubt him—until Skeeter tracks Specs down and rushes him to the stadium. It's the seventh inning. The team is trailing 5 to 3. As he jogs onto the field, the crowd roars. Despite her heartbreak, Alice sends him a kiss from the stands, rekindling his spirit.

Specs pitches magnificently, tying the game by the ninth. Then, with two outs and the bases loaded, he steps up to bat. He slams a scorching line drive into the outfield and charges around the bases. Sliding into home, he scores the winning run. The stadium erupts.

In a jubilant rush, Specs and Alice embrace on the field, surrounded by cheering fans and eager photographers. Before

== Cast ==
- Monte Blue as Buchanan "Specs" White
- Clyde Cook as Skeeter McKinnon
- Leila Hyams as Alice Hobbs
- William Demarest as John Gilroy
- Richard Tucker as Wallace Ramsey
- Burt Marshall as Stetson
- Tom Dempsey as The "Parson"
- Wilfred North as Stokes
- William Wilson as William "Lefty" Murphy
- Violet Palmer as Marie, Alice's maid
- Rodney Hildebrand as Detective

== See also ==
- List of baseball films
- List of early sound feature films (1926–1929)
- List of early Warner Bros. sound and talking features
