= Tony Runs Wild =

1926 film

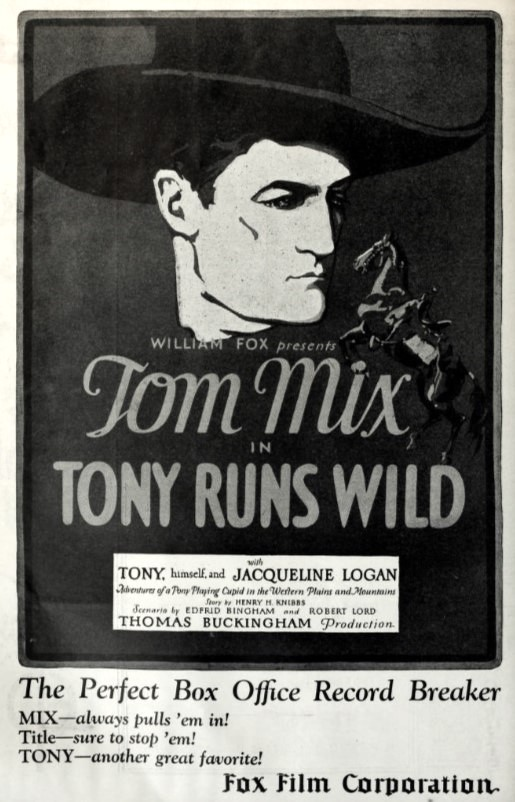
- Advertisement
- Directed by: Tom Buckingham
- Written by: Edfrid A. Bingham (scenario); Robert Lord (scenario)
- Story by: Henry H. Knibbs
- Starring: Tom Mix; Tony the Horse; Jacqueline Logan; Lawford Davidson; Duke R. Lee; Vivien Oakland
- Cinematography: Daniel B. Clark
- Production company: Fox Film Corporation
- Distributed by: Fox Film Corporation
- Release date: April 18, 1926
- Running time: 67 minutes; 6 reels
- Country: United States
- Language: Silent (English intertitles)

Tony Runs Wild is a 1926 American silent Western film directed by Tom Buckingham and starring Tom Mix, Tony the Horse, Jacqueline Logan, Lawford Davidson, Duke R. Lee, and Vivien Oakland. The film was released by Fox Film Corporation on April 18, 1926.

== Cast ==
- Tom Mix as Tom Trent
- Tony the Horse as Tony – the Wild Horse Leader
- Jacqueline Logan as Grace Percival
- Lawford Davidson as Slade
- Duke R. Lee as Bender (credited as Duke Lee)
- Vivien Oakland as Mrs. Johnson (credited as Vivian Oakland)
- Marion Harlan as Ethel Johnson
- Edward Martindel as Mr. Johnson
- Raymond Wells as Sheriff
- Dick Carter as Ranch Foreman (credited as Richard Carter)
- Arthur Morrison as Auto Stage Driver
- Lucien Littlefield as Red
- Jack Padjan as Deputy Sheriff (uncredited)

== Preservation ==
A copy of Tony Runs Wild survives in the Czech Film Archive.
