= Domestic Troubles =

1928 film by Ray Enright

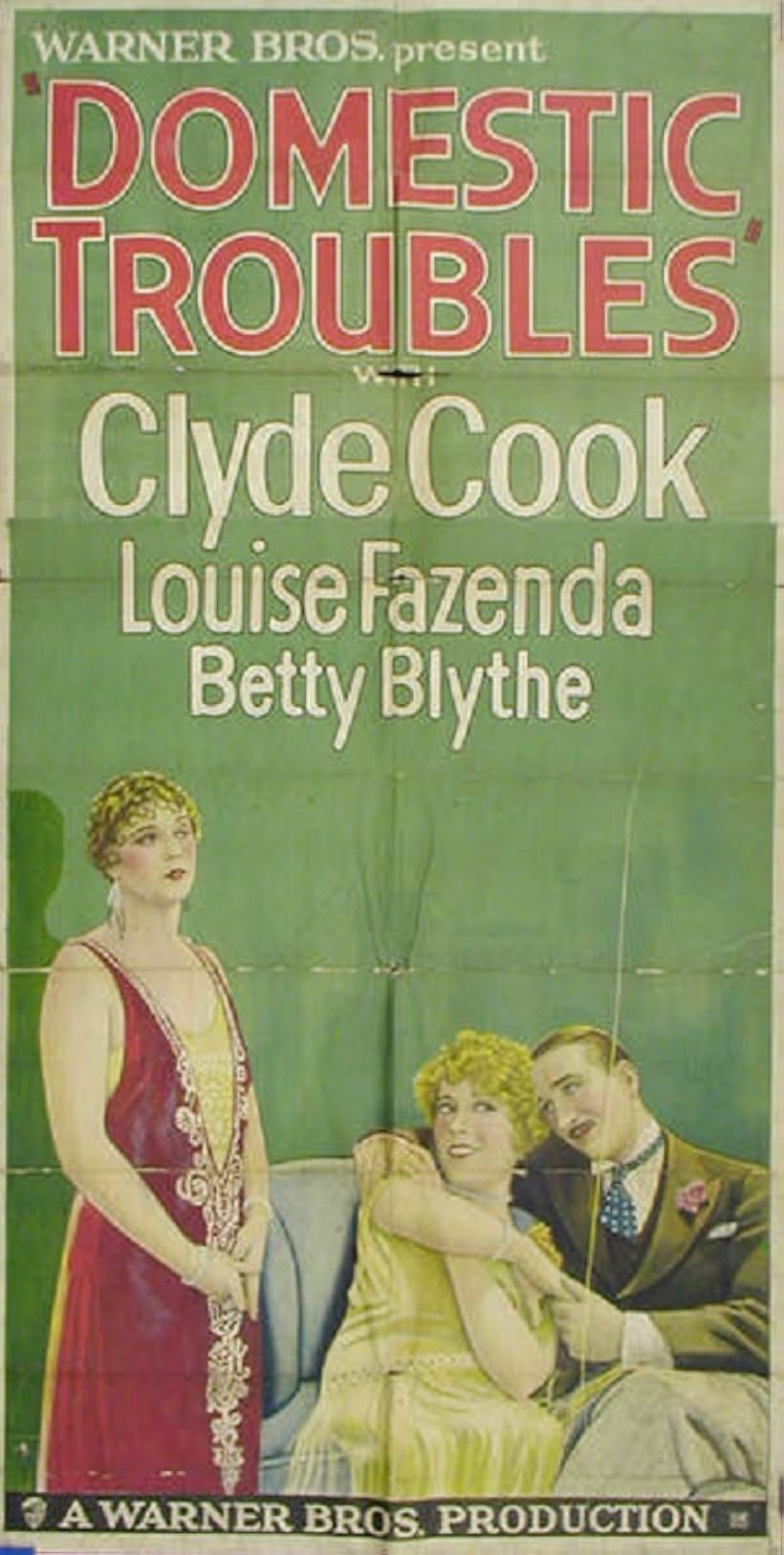
- Directed by: Ray Enright
- Written by: C. Graham Baker; Joseph Jackson
- Starring: Clyde Cook; Louise Fazenda; Betty Blythe
- Cinematography: Charles Van Enger
- Edited by: George Marks
- Production company: Warner Bros. Pictures
- Distributed by: Warner Bros. Pictures
- Release date: March 28, 1928
- Running time: 58 minutes
- Country: United States
- Languages: Sound (Synchronized) (English Intertitles)

Domestic Troubles is a 1928 American synchronized sound comedy film directed by Ray Enright and starring Clyde Cook, Louise Fazenda and Betty Blythe. While the film has no audible dialog, it was released with a synchronized musical score with sound effects using the sound-on-disc Vitaphone process. The film was produced and released by Warner Bros. Pictures.

== Plot ==
Twin brothers James and Horace Bullard may share the same face, but that's where the similarity ends. James is a dapper, fun-loving man-about-town, while Horace is a stiff-collared prude with old-fashioned morals. Ironically, fate has played a joke on both: James is married to a strident, no-nonsense clubwoman, Carrie, while Horace has landed a flirty, party-loving wife, Grace.

Before leaving on a lecture tour, Carrie warns James that any misconduct in her absence will lead to a permanent separation. James, who genuinely cares for her, vows to behave—but not before taking one final joyride with a vivacious showgirl named Lola. Unfortunately, that “last hurrah” lands him in jail for speeding, sentenced to five days behind bars.

In a panic, James calls on his upright twin Horace to save face by impersonating him until Carrie returns. Horace, eager to help his brother, informs Grace that he's going on a business trip and moves into James's home just as Carrie comes back—surprisingly softened and ready to reconcile.

To avoid domestic awkwardness, Horace suggests a night out—something James might have done. Trying to stay in character, he takes Carrie to a wild nightclub. There, under swirling lights and jazz, Horace spots none other than his own wife Grace, dazzling the crowd and clearly enjoying the nightlife. To save her from scandal, and to further the impersonation, Horace gallantly offers to bring her “home”—which only makes matters more tangled.

Grace, who has long admired her roguish brother-in-law James, is intrigued by his sudden gentlemanly attentions. Carrie, on the other hand, is outraged by the arrival of a strange woman in her home, and becomes increasingly suspicious of her “husband’s” attentions to her. Determined to eject Grace, she finds herself in a standoff with the increasingly flustered Horace.

As the night wears on, Grace playfully flirts with "James"—until she notices a small strawberry birthmark on his neck. It's a mark she knows all too well: her own husband Horace has one in the exact same place. In an instant, she realizes the truth and decides to have a little fun of her own.

Just as things spin toward total disaster, the real James is released from jail and walks into the chaos. Horace, relieved beyond words, shoves his brother into Carrie's bedroom to take over. Carrie, delighted to see her husband finally behaving like himself again, accepts him warmly—none the wiser about the double act that just took place.

Meanwhile, Grace confronts Horace about his impersonation—but assures him all is forgiven if he, in turn, can forgive her for her wild ways. The domestic crisis is resolved, and the only one left in the dark is Carrie, who never learns the truth behind her husband's sudden “reform.”

== Cast ==
- Clyde Cook as James Bullard / Horace Bullard
- Louise Fazenda as Lola
- Betty Blythe as Carrie
- Jean Lefferty as Grace
- Arthur Rankin as Meredith Roberts

== Preservation ==
The film is now lost.

== See also ==
- List of early sound feature films (1926–1929)
- List of early Warner Bros. sound and talking features

== Bibliography ==
- Roy Liebman. Vitaphone Films: A Catalogue of the Features and Shorts. McFarland, 2003.
