= John T. Murray =

Australian actor (1886–1957)

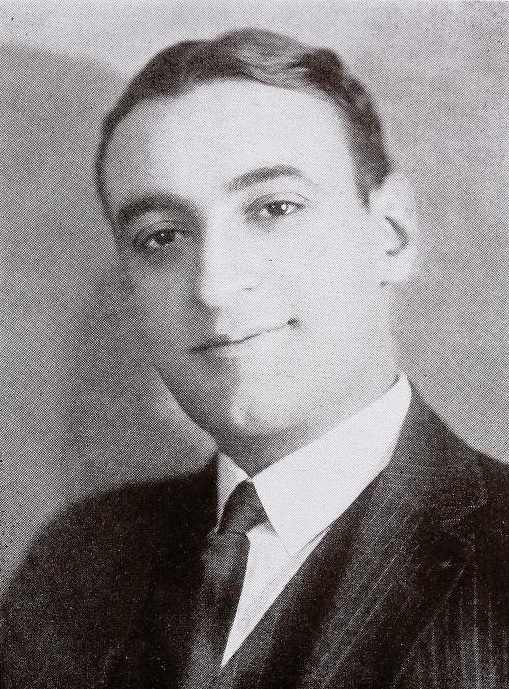
- Born: 28 September 1886; Melbourne, Victoria, Australia
- Died: 12 February 1957 (aged 70); Los Angeles, California, U.S.
- Occupation: Actor
- Years active: 1924–1943
- Spouse: Vivian Oakland

John T. Murray (28 August 1886 – 12 February 1957) was an Australian stage and film actor.

== Biography ==
Born in Melbourne in 1886, Murray was married to actress Vivien Oakland, who he had appeared with on the vaudeville stage. He died in Woodland Hills, California in 1957 from a stroke.

== Selected stage appearances ==
- The Passing Show of 1915 (1915)
- The Show of Wonders (1917)
- The Whirl of New York (1921)
- The Yankee Princess (1922)

== Partial filmography ==
- Sally (1925)
- Joanna (1925)
- Stop Flirting (1925)
- High Steppers (1926)
- Wife Tamers (1926) (short)
- The Gay Old Bird (1927)
- Finger Prints (1927)
- Sonny Boy (1929)
- Honky Tonk (1929)
- Personality (1930)
- Young as You Feel (1931)
- Charlie Chan Carries On (1931)
- Alexander Hamilton (1931)
- Love Birds (1934)
- The Lady in Scarlet (1935)
- Small Town Boy (1937)
- Girl Loves Boy (1937)
- Gang Bullets (1938)
- Down on the Farm (1938)
- Quick Millions (1939)
- The Hardys Ride High (1939)

== Bibliography ==
- Emily W. Leider. Myrna Loy: The Only Good Girl in Hollywood. University of California Press, 2011.
