= This Woman (film) =

1924 film directed by Phil Rosen

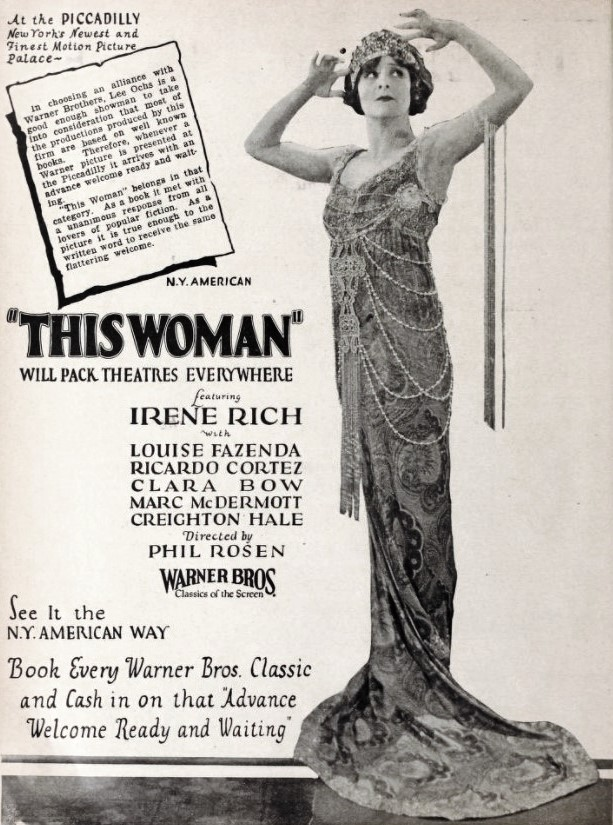
- Advertisement
- Directed by: Phil Rosen
- Screenplay by: Louis D. Lighton; Hope Loring
- Based on: This Woman by Howard Rockey
- Starring: Irene Rich; Ricardo Cortez; Louise Fazenda
- Cinematography: H. Lyman Broening
- Production company: Warner Bros.
- Distributed by: Warner Bros.
- Release date: November 2, 1924
- Running time: 70 minutes
- Country: United States
- Language: Silent (English intertitles)

This Woman is a 1924 American silent drama film directed by Phil Rosen, written by Louis D. Lighton and Hope Loring, and starring Irene Rich, Ricardo Cortez, Louise Fazenda, Frank Elliott, Creighton Hale, and Marc McDermott. Based on the 1924 novel This Woman by Howard Rockey, it was released by Warner Bros. on November 2, 1924.

== Plot ==
As described in a review in a film magazine, facing poverty, Carol Drayton a singer, attempts suicide but is saved by Rose, a young woman of the streets who buys her a meal in a questionable café. Gordon Duane, a wealthy man joins them, the place is raided, Duane lies about Carol. She is arrested and goes to jail under an assumed name. Released, she wanders about the street penniless. An intoxicated Bobby Bleecker pays her to sing in front of his sweetheart Aline Sturdevant's house.

Stratini, a famous impresario, is charmed with her voice and offers to teach her, and she becomes a protégé of the wealthy Sturdevants. The butler finds her jail release and steals a necklace, seeking to force her to aid him. Bobby comes to the rescue, learns the truth but keeps mum.

Whitney Duane falls in love with Carol but doubts her because of gossip. Carol meets Rose who is down and out and borrows money from Bobby to aid her. This makes Bobby's sweetheart, Aline, jealous.

Gordon Duane returns from abroad. To clear matters, Carol tells her story implicating Duane. She prepares to leave, but Stratini, who has always believed in her, sticks by her, and Carol makes him admit that he loves her.

== Cast ==
- Irene Rich as Carol Drayton
- Ricardo Cortez as Whitney Duane
- Louise Fazenda as Rose
- Frank Elliott as Gordon Duane
- Creighton Hale as Bobby Bleecker
- Marc McDermott as Stratini
- Helen Dunbar as Mrs. Sturdevant
- Clara Bow as Aline Sturdevant
- Otto Hoffman as Judson

== Preservation ==
A complete print of This Woman is preserved at Lobster Films, Paris.
