= Wandering Papas =

1926 comedy film

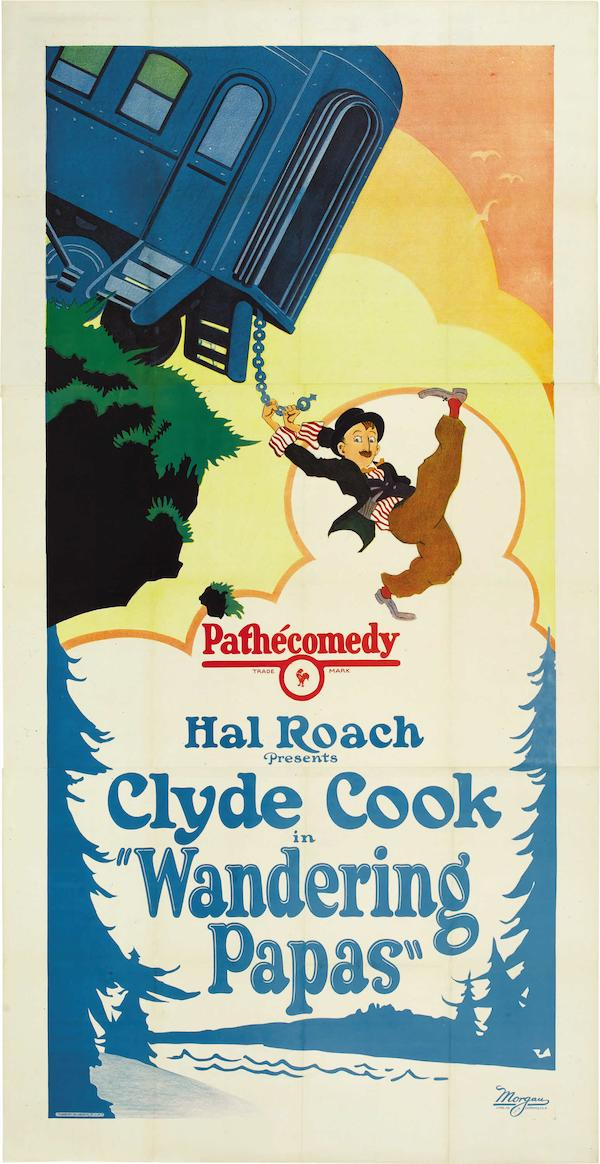
- Film poster
- Directed by: Stan Laurel
- Written by: Stan Laurel; H. M. Walker; Hal Yates
- Produced by: Hal Roach
- Starring: Oliver Hardy
- Cinematography: Glen Carrier; Len Powers; Frank Young
- Edited by: Richard C. Currier
- Distributed by: Pathé Exchange
- Release date: February 21, 1926
- Running time: 20 minutes
- Country: United States
- Languages: Silent film English intertitles

Wandering Papas (1926)

Wandering Papas is a 1926 American comedy film starring Clyde Cook, featuring Oliver Hardy, and directed by Stan Laurel.

== Cast ==
- Clyde Cook as The camp cook
- Oliver Hardy as The foreman (as Babe Hardy)
- Sue O'Neill as Susie, the hermit's daughter
- Tyler Brooke as Onion, a bridge engineer
- Adolph Milar as The hermit (as Adolph Millar)

== See also ==
- List of American films of 1926
