= Louise Fazenda =

American actress (1895–1962)

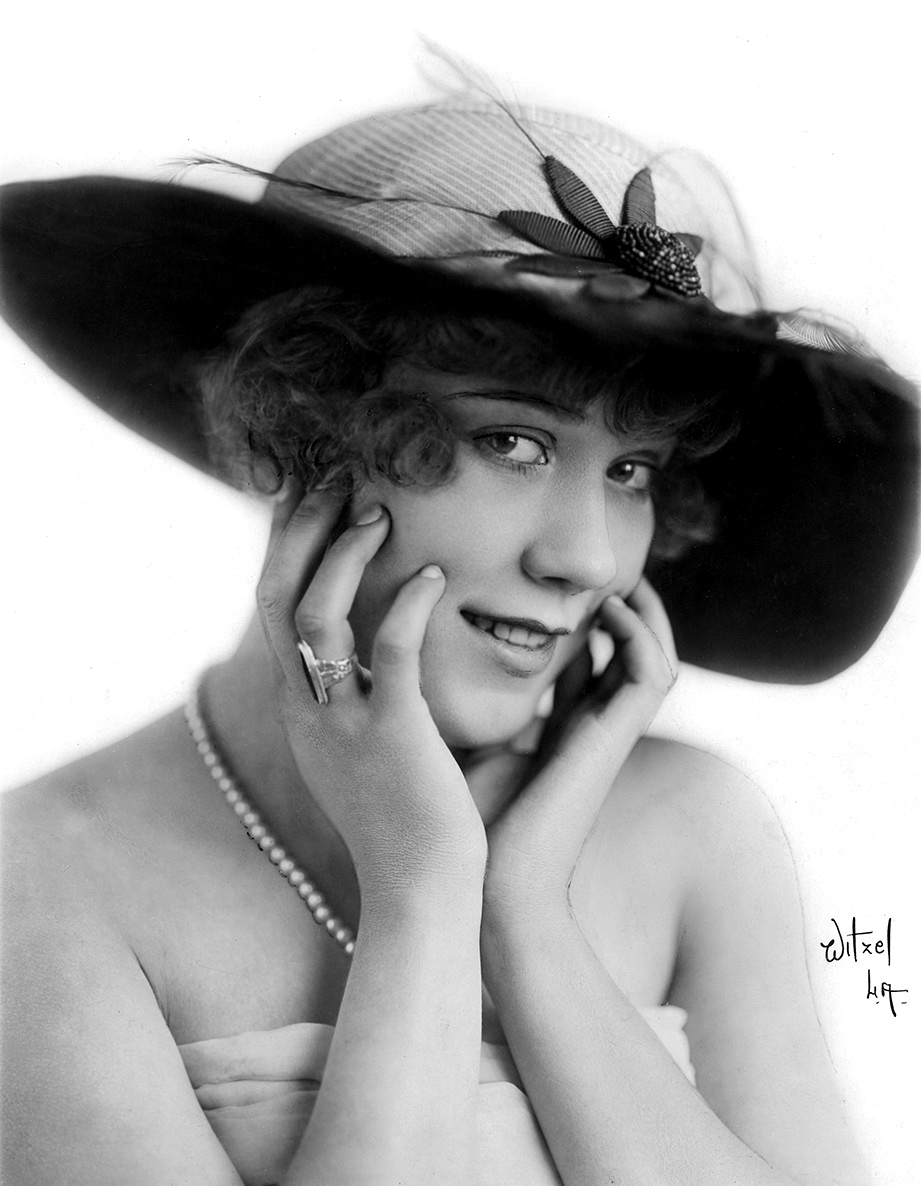
- Fazenda in 1920
- Born: June 17, 1895; Lafayette, Indiana, U.S.
- Died: April 17, 1962 (aged 66); Beverly Hills, California, U.S.
- Resting place: Inglewood Park Cemetery, Inglewood, California
- Occupation: Actress
- Years active: 1913–1939
- Spouses: Noel M. Smith (m. 1917; div. 1926) Hal B. Wallis (m. 1927)
- Children: 1

Signature
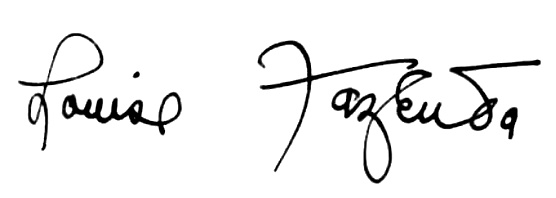

Louise Fazenda (June 17, 1895 – April 17, 1962) was an American film actress, appearing chiefly in silent comedy films.

== Early life ==
Fazenda was born in her maternal grandparents' house in Lafayette, Indiana, the daughter of merchandise broker Joseph A. Fazenda, who was born in Mexico, and Nelda T. Schilling Fazenda, a Chicago native. She was of Portuguese, French, and Italian descent on her father's side and of German descent on her mother's.

The Fazenda family moved to California, where Joseph Fazenda opened a grocery store. Louise attended Los Angeles High School and St. Mary's Convent, and one of her jobs after school was delivering groceries for the family business by a horse-drawn wagon.

== Career ==
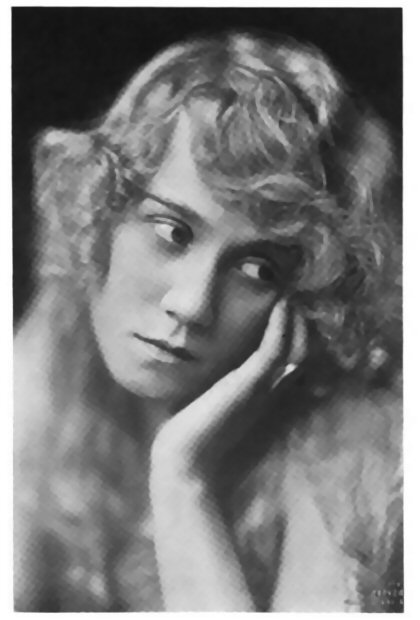
Who's Who in the Film World, 1914

She made her first film in 1913. She gained experience with bit parts. She was best known as a character actor in silent films, playing roles such as a fussy spinster and a blacksmith.

She briefly left films from 1921 to 1922 to perform vaudeville. Her transition into talking pictures led to more serious roles, including the giggly fiancée in the prestige antiwar film The Road Back. The Old Maid, in 1939, was her last of her nearly 300 movie appearances.

== Marriage ==
In 1927, Fazenda married Hal B. Wallis, a producer at Warner Bros., and they remained married until her death. They had one son, Brent, who became a psychiatrist.

== Death ==
Fazenda died of a cerebral hemorrhage in Beverly Hills, California. Wallis was in Hawaii making Girls! Girls! Girls! starring Elvis Presley and left immediately for home. She was interred at the Inglewood Park Cemetery in Inglewood, California. At her funeral, many stories were told of Fazenda's volunteer work, such as caring for children at UCLA Medical Center and taking in two children during World War II.

== Recognition ==
Fazenda has a star at 6801 Hollywood Boulevard in the Motion Pictures section of the Hollywood Walk of Fame.

She appears in the lyrics of "Out in the Street", a rock-ballad from 1975 by hard rock band UFO. "Your comic book impersonations, Louise Fazenda and Buster Keaton"

== Selected filmography ==
Year	Title	Role	Notes
1913	Poor Jake's Demise	Servant	Short subject Incomplete
1913	Almost an Actress	Susie	Short subject Lost film
1915	Hogan's Romance Upset		Short subject
1915	Fatty's Tintype Tangle	Edgar's Wife	Short subject
1916	The Marble Heart		Lost film
1916	Maid Mad		Short subject
1917	Maggie's First False Step		Lost film
1919	Bullin' the Bullsheviki		
1919	Salome vs. Shenandoah		Short subject Lost film
1920	Down on the Farm	Louise, the Farmer's Daughter	
1920	Married Life	Wife of Heckler at Theatre	
1921	A Small Town Idol	Theatregoer	
1922	Bright Eyes	the Golfer	Short subject
1922	The Beauty Shop	Cremo Panatella	Lost film
1922	Bow Wow	the Country Girl	Lost film
1922	Quincy Adams Sawyer	Mandy Skinner	Lost film
1922	The Beautiful and Damned	Muriel	Lost film
1923	The Fog	Millie Richards	Lost film
1923	The Spider and the Rose	Dolores	Lost film
1923	Main Street	Bea Sorenson	Lost film
1923	Mary of the Movies		Cameo; Uncredited; Incomplete film
1923	The Spoilers	Tilly Nelson	
1923	Tea: With a Kick!		Lost film
1923	The Gold Diggers	Mabel Munroe	Incomplete film
1923	The Wanters	Mary	Lost film
1923	The Old Fool	Dolores Murphy	Lost film
1924	The Dramatic Life of Abraham Lincoln	Sally, a Country Girl	Incomplete film
1924	The Galloping Fish	Undine	
1924	True as Steel	Miss Leeds	Incomplete film
1924	Listen Lester	Arbutus Quilty	
1924	Being Respectable	Deborah Carpenter	
1924	This Woman	Rose	
1924	The Lighthouse by the Sea	Flora Gale	
1925	The Night Club	Carmen	
1925	Cheaper to Marry	Flora	
1925	The Price of Pleasure	Stella Kelly	Lost film
1925	Déclassé	Mrs. Walton	
1925	A Broadway Butterfly	Cookie Dale	Lost film
1925	Grounds for Divorce	Marianne	Incomplete film, missing reel 3
1925	The Love Hour	Jenny Tibbs	Lost film
1925	Compromise	Hilda	Lost film
1925	Bobbed Hair	Sweetie	
1925	Hogan's Alley	Dolly	
1926	The Bat	Lizzie Allen	
1926	Footloose Widows	Flo	
1926	Miss Nobody	Mazie Raleigh	Lost film
1926	The Passionate Quest	Madame Mathilde	Lost film
1926	Tin Gods		Lost film
1926	Millionaires	Reba, Esther's Sister	Lost film
1926	The Old Soak	Annie	Lost film
1926	The Lady of the Harem	Yasmin	Lost film
1926	Ladies at Play	Aunt Katherine	Lost film
1927	Finger Prints	Dora Traynor	Lost film
1927	The Red Mill	Gretchen	
1927	The Gay Old Bird	Sisseretta Simpkins	
1927	Babe Comes Home	Laundry Girl	Lost film
1927	Cradle Snatchers	Susan Martin	Incomplete film, missing reels 3 and 4
1927	Simple Sis	Sis	Lost film
1927	A Sailor's Sweetheart	Cynthia Botts	Incomplete film
1927	A Texas Steer	Mrs. Ma Brander	Lost film
1927	Ham and Eggs at the Front	Cally Brown	
1928	Tillie's Punctured Romance	Tillie, a Runaway	Lost film
1928	Domestic Troubles	Lola	Lost film
1928	Pay as You Enter	Mary Smith	Lost film
1928	Vamping Venus	Maggie Cassidy / Circe	Lost film
1928	Five and Ten Cent Annie	Annie	Lost film A fragment exists
1928	Heart to Heart	Aunt Katie Boyd	
1928	The Terror	Mrs. Elvery	Lost film
1928	Noah's Ark	Hilda/Tavern Maid	Film survives as a partially restored 108 minute version; the original 138 minute version is lost
1928	Outcast	Mable	
1928	Riley the Cop	Lena Krausmeyer	
1928	Taxi 13		Uncredited
1929	Stark Mad	Mrs. Fleming	Lost film
1929	The Desert Song	Susan	
1929	House of Horror	Louise	Lost film
1929	Hot Stuff	Aunt Kate	
1929	On with the Show!	Sarah Fogharty	
1929	Hard to Get	Ma Martin	
1929	The Show of Shows	in 'Recitations' Sketch	
1929	The Broadway Hoofer	Jane	
1930	No, No, Nanette	Sue Smith	Incomplete film
1930	Wide Open	Agatha Hathaway	
1930	Loose Ankles	Sarah Harper	
1930	High Society Blues	Mrs. Granger	
1930	Spring Is Here	Emily Braley	
1930	Bride of the Regiment	Teresa, the Maid	Lost film A 20-second fragment exists
1930	Rain or Shine	Frankie	
1930	Leathernecking	Hortense	
1930	Viennese Nights	Gretl Kruger	
1931	Gun Smoke	Hampsey Dell	
1931	Misbehaving Ladies	Aunt Kate Boyd	
1931	Newly Rich	Maggie Tiffany	
1931	The Mad Parade	Fanny Smithers	
1931	The Cuban Love Song	Elvira	
1932	Racing Youth	Daisy Joy	
1932	Once in a Lifetime	Helen Hobart	
1932	The Unwritten Law	Lulu Potts	
1933	Hunting Trouble	Walter's Wife	Short subject
1933	Alice in Wonderland	White Queen	
1934	Caravan	Governess Bessie Opitz	
1934	Wonder Bar	Mrs. Pratt	
1935	The Winning Ticket	Nora Tomasello	
1935	The Casino Murder Case	Becky	
1935	Broadway Gondolier	Flaggenheim	
1935	Bad Boy	Mrs. Harris – Landlady	
1935	The Widow from Monte Carlo	Rose Torrent	
1936	Colleen	Alicia Ames	
1936	Doughnuts and Society	Kate Flannagan	
1936	I Married a Doctor	Bea Sorenson	
1937	Ready, Willing, and Able	Clara Heineman	
1937	The Road Back	Angelina	
1937	Ever Since Eve	Abbie Belldon	
1937	Merry-Go-Round of 1938	Mrs. Penelope Updike	
1937	First Lady	Mrs. Lavinia Mae Creevey	
1938	Swing Your Lady	Sadie	
1938	Down on the Farm	Aunt Ida	
1939	The Old Maid	Dora	
