= The Gay Old Bird =

1927 film directed by Herman C. Raymaker

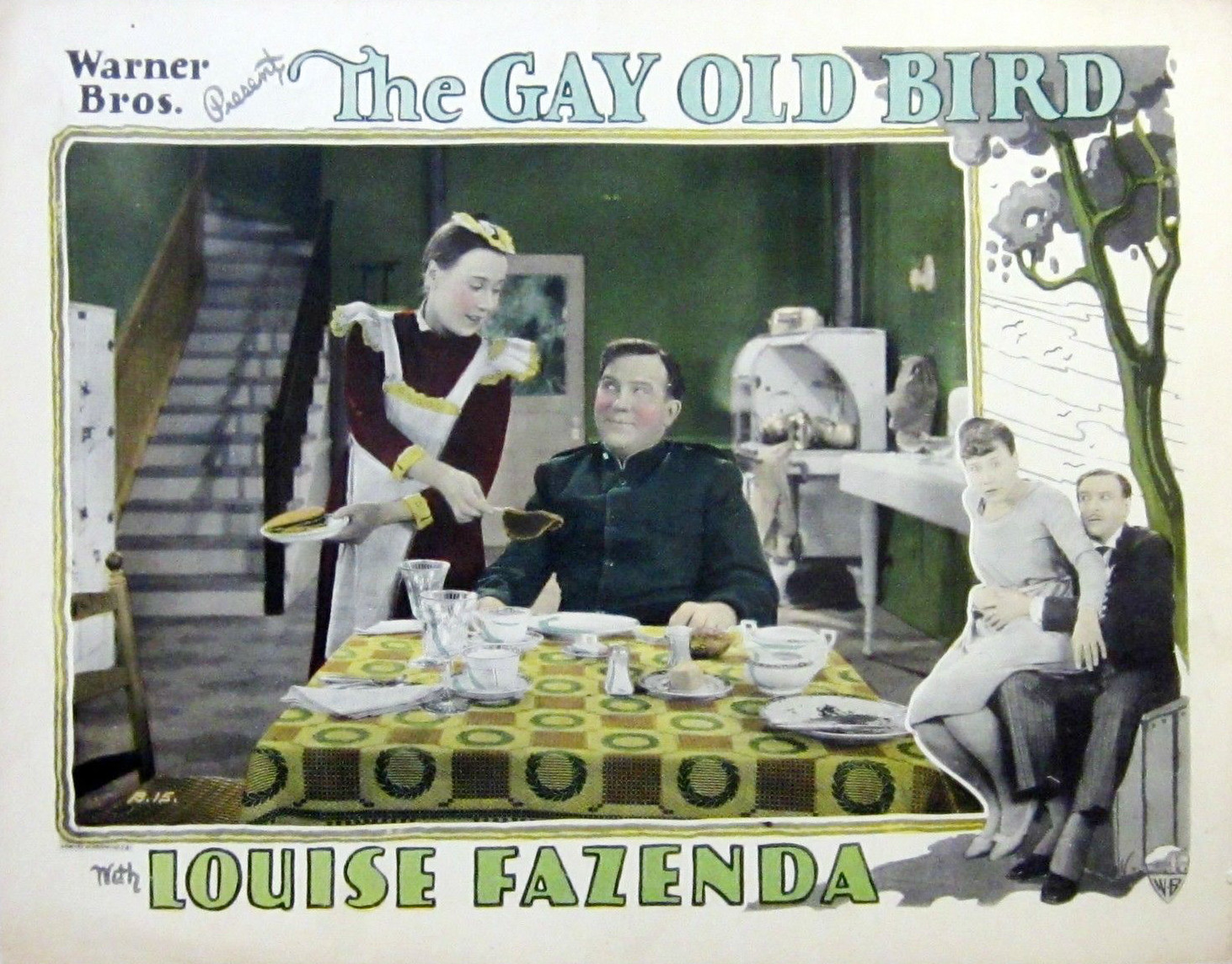
- Lobby card
- Directed by: Herman C. Raymaker
- Screenplay by: C. Graham Baker; Edward Clark
- Story by: Virginia Dale
- Starring: Louise Fazenda; John T. Murray; Jane Winton; William Demarest; John Steppling; Frances Raymond
- Cinematography: Virgil Miller
- Production company: Warner Bros.
- Distributed by: Warner Bros.
- Release date: February 26, 1927
- Running time: 70 minutes
- Country: United States
- Language: English
- Budget: $98,000
- Box office: $184,000

The Gay Old Bird is a 1927 American comedy film directed by Herman C. Raymaker and written by C. Graham Baker and Edward Clark. The film stars Louise Fazenda, John T. Murray, Jane Winton, William Demarest, John Steppling and Frances Raymond. The film was released by Warner Bros. on February 26, 1927.

== Cast ==
- Louise Fazenda as Sisseretta Simpkins
- John T. Murray as Mr. Cluney
- Jane Winton as Mrs. Cluney
- William Demarest as Mr. Fixit
- John Steppling as Uncle
- Frances Raymond as Aunt
- Edgar Kennedy as Chauffeur

== Box Office ==
According to Warner Bros records the film earned $140,000 domestically and $44,000 foreign.
