= Wolf of New York =

- Directed by: William C. McGann
- Screenplay by: Gordon Kahn; Lionel Houser
- Story by: Leslie T. White; Arnold Belgard
- Produced by: Robert North
- Starring: Edmund Lowe; Rose Hobart; James Stephenson; Jerome Cowan; William Demarest; Maurice Murphy
- Cinematography: Reggie Lanning
- Edited by: Ernest J. Nims
- Music by: William Lava
- Production company: Republic Pictures
- Distributed by: Republic Pictures
- Release date: January 23, 1940
- Running time: 67 minutes
- Country: United States
- Language: English

Wolf of New York is a 1940 American crime film directed by William C. McGann and written by Gordon Kahn and Lionel Houser. The film stars Edmund Lowe, Rose Hobart, James Stephenson, Jerome Cowan, William Demarest and Maurice Murphy. The film was released on January 23, 1940, by Republic Pictures.

== Plot ==
Gangster melodrama concerns a stolen bonds and securities racket and an unethical young lawyer who gets entangled with the underworld but ultimately comes down on the side of right by trying to defend an innocent man and helping to bring the gangster and his colleagues to justice.

== Cast ==
- Edmund Lowe as Chris Faulkner
- Rose Hobart as Peggy Nolan
- James Stephenson as Hiram Rogers
- Jerome Cowan as Cosgrave
- William Demarest as Bill Ennis
- Maurice Murphy as Frankie Mason
- Charles D. Brown as Const. Nolan
- Edward Gargan as W. Thornton Upshaw
- Andrew Tombes as Sylvester Duncan
- Ben Welden as Owney McGill
- Ann Baldwin as Gladys
- Roy Gordon as Governor
