= Party Fever =

- Directed by: George Sidney
- Written by: Hal Law; Robert A. McGowan
- Produced by: Jack Chertok for MGM
- Starring: Darla Hood; Eugene Lee; Carl Switzer
- Cinematography: Robert Pittack
- Music by: David Snell
- Distributed by: Metro-Goldwyn-Mayer
- Release date: August 27, 1938
- Running time: 9:31
- Country: United States
- Language: English

Party Fever is a 1938 Our Gang short comedy film directed by George Sidney. It was the 170th Our Gang short to be released.

== Plot ==
Once again, Alfalfa and Butch are bitter rivals for the affections of Darla. The nerdish Waldo comes up with a solution: Alfalfa and Butch will compete for the title of Junior Mayor of Greenpoint during Boys' Week, and whichever one wins will earn the honor of escorting Darla to the annual Strawberry Festival. But despite the strenuous efforts of both young candidates, a "dark horse" wins not only the election, but also the girl.

Alfalfa, backed by Porky and Buckwheat, launches a clean-up campaign. But Butch replaces the garbage mess they've just cleaned up. Alfalfa takes revenge with an overripe tomato,

Alfalfa decides to go up in a balloon basket to prove what a daredevil he is, but the tie-rope breaks and he goes sky high.Butch is only too happy to bring him down with a slingshot.

== Cast ==
=== The Gang ===
- Carl Switzer as Alfalfa
- Darla Hood as Darla
- Eugene Lee as Porky
- Billie Thomas as Buckwheat
- Pete the Pup as Himself

=== Additional cast ===
- Tommy Bond as Butch
- Darwood Kaye as Waldo
- Sidney Kibrick as Woim
- Joe Levine as Kid bullied by Butch
- Frank Jaquet as Uncle Frank, the Mayor of Greenpoint

=== Crowd extras ===
Grace Bohanon, Bobby Callahan, Payne Johnson, Harold Switzer, Laura June Williams

== Notes ==
Party Fever was the fifth consecutive entry made without George McFarland as Spanky, who would rejoin the series with the next entry, Aladdin's Lantern. It was also the last Our Gang short in which Pete the Pup would appear.

== See also ==
- Our Gang filmography
