= The Little Ranger =

- Directed by: Gordon Douglas
- Written by: Hal Law; Robert A. McGowan
- Produced by: Jack Chertok
- Cinematography: Robert Pittack
- Music by: David Snell
- Distributed by: Metro-Goldwyn-Mayer
- Release date: August 6, 1938
- Running time: 10:38
- Country: United States
- Language: English

The Little Ranger is a 1938 Our Gang short comedy film directed by Gordon Douglas. It was the 169th short in the Our Gang series, and the first produced by Metro-Goldwyn-Mayer, who purchased the rights to the series from creator Hal Roach.

== Plot ==
Snubbed by his girlfriend Darla, Alfalfa accepts the invitation of tomboyish Muggsy to attend the local picture show. While watching the adventures of his favorite cowboy star, Alfalfa dreams that he himself is a Wild West sheriff, with his pals Buckwheat and Porky as deputies. Naturally, Darla also figures prominently in Alfalfa's dream, as does his archrival Butch. What happens next determines Alfalfa's destiny when he wakes up from his dream.

== Cast ==
=== The Gang ===
- Carl Switzer as Alfalfa
- Darla Hood as Darla
- Eugene Lee as Porky
- Billie Thomas as Buckwheat
- Shirley Coates as Muggsy

=== Additional cast ===
- Tommy Bond as Butch
- Sidney Kibrick as Woim
- Darwood Kaye as Waldo
- Grace Bohanon as Girl in theatre

=== Members of Butch's gang ===
Dix Davis, Tim Davis, Calvin Robert Ellison, Joe "Corky" Geil, Henry Lee, Joe Levine, Harold Switzer, Fred Walburn

== Notability ==
The Little Ranger was the first Our Gang entry to be produced at MGM. By 1936, Hal Roach, who had produced the series at his studio since 1922, had wanted to get out of the increasingly less profitable short subjects market and into feature films. While Roach successfully moved Laurel and Hardy into features and began producing several other feature properties such as Topper, the Our Gang feature General Spanky was a box office failure and MGM persuaded Roach to keep the series in production as a series of one-reel shorts.

Roach constantly fought with MGM to get distribution for a larger number of feature film releases as the studio's short subject output was reduced to only the Our Gang one-reelers. In early 1938, United Artists offered Roach a more lucrative and flexible distribution deal, prompting him to end his deal with MGM. This was done by delivering a final Roach-MGM Laurel and Hardy feature, Block-Heads, canceling two "All-Star" musical features Roach was contracted to produce for MGM, and selling the entire Our Gang unit to MGM.

The Our Gang sale was done at MGM's insistence rather than canceling the still-popular and profitable series. The sale included rights to the name "Our Gang", contracts for the child actors and writers, and a provision that forbade Roach to produce any Our Gang-like films or to reissue any Our Gang film he had produced. Then-current Our Gang director Gordon Douglas was loaned out for several months to launch the series at MGM, who would hire George Sidney as the permanent series director.

Hal Roach Studios veterans Hal Law and former part-time director Robert A. McGowan transferred to MGM to write the screenplays for the new Our Gang shorts. McGowan was the nephew of Our Gang's original director and producer Robert F. McGowan, and had directed several mediocre 1920s/early 1930s Our Gang shorts himself under the pseudonym "Anthony Mack".

== Production notes ==
The Little Ranger was filmed late in June 1938, six weeks after Hide and Shriek. In their book The Little Rascals: The Life and Times of Our Gang, film historians Leonard Maltin and Richard W. Bann stated that The Little Ranger was "a fine example of what could have been done with Our Gang at their new headquarters". MGM continued producing the 10-minute Our Gang shorts until 1944. Many subsequent works are seen as lesser entries in the series canon.

This was also the fourth short of five to be made without George "Spanky" McFarland. McFarland had departed from the series when his contract with Roach ended in February 1938, and would return when rehired by MGM in July. Tommy "Butch" Bond, Darwood "Waldo" Kaye, and Sidney "The Woim" Kibrick returned for this short and would continue with the series until 1940 on a recurring status. The new Our Gang theme song was an instrumental medley of "London Bridge", "Here We Go Round the Mulberry Bush" and "The Farmer in the Dell". It remained in use until the series ended in 1944.

== See also ==
- Our Gang filmography
