= Football Romeo =

- Directed by: George Sidney
- Written by: Hal Law; Robert A. McGowan
- Produced by: Jack Chertok for MGM
- Starring: Carl Switzer; George McFarland; Tommy Bond; Darla Hood; Eugene Lee; Billie Thomas
- Cinematography: Clyde De Vinna
- Edited by: Jack White
- Music by: David Snell
- Distributed by: Metro-Goldwyn-Mayer
- Release date: November 12, 1938
- Running time: 10:25
- Country: United States
- Language: English

Football Romeo is a 1938 Our Gang short comedy film directed by George Sidney. It was the 173rd Our Gang short to be released.

== Plot ==
The gang squares off against Butch's Assassins in a crucial football game. Star player Alfalfa balks at participating, leaving it up to Darla to coerce and cajole him into donning his uniform. The climax of the game finds Alfalfa attempting a sixty-yard touchdown, despite the formidable opposition of his lifelong rival Butch.

== Cast ==
=== The Gang ===
- Carl Switzer as Alfalfa
- Darla Hood as Darla
- George McFarland as Spanky
- Eugene Lee as Porky
- Billie Thomas as Buckwheat
- Gary Jasgur as Gary
- Leonard Landy as Phooey

=== Additional cast ===
- Tommy Bond as Butch
- Sidney Kibrick as The Woim
- Barbara Bedford as Alfalfa's mother

=== Bit players and extras ===
Becky Bohanon, Buddy Bowles, Floyd Fisher, Charline Flanders, Morris Grace Jr., Bruce Grant, Joe Levine, Roger McGee, Norman Salling, Corrine Varian, Robert Winkler

== Notes ==
Football Romeo benefited from the comedy expertise of uncredited script contributor Jack White, who directed many Three Stooges films at Columbia Pictures under the pseudonym "Preston Black".

== See also ==
- Our Gang filmography
