= Duel Personalities =

- Directed by: George Sidney
- Written by: Hal Law; Robert A. McGowan
- Produced by: Jack Chertok for MGM
- Cinematography: Jackson Rose
- Distributed by: MGM
- Release date: March 11, 1939
- Running time: 9:51
- Country: United States
- Language: English

Duel Personalities is a 1939 Our Gang short comedy film directed by George Sidney. It was the 177th Our Gang short to be released.

== Plot ==
Upset that his youthful sweetheart Darla has once again thrown him over in favor of neighborhood bully Butch, Alfalfa tries to forget his troubles by watching the free performance by Professor William Delmore, a famed hypnotist. Chosen as a subject, Alfalfa is hypnotized into believing that he is the fearless D'Artagnan, of Three Musketeers. Before Professor Delmore can remove the hypnotic suggestion, he is knocked unconscious. Armed with this bold new personality, Alfalfa not only sweeps Darla off her feet, but also challenges the dumbfounded Butch (Rochefort) to a duel. But between the time of the challenge to the actual duel, a couple of things happen which could change the entire complexity of the duel itself.

== Cast ==
=== The Gang ===
- Carl Switzer as Alfalfa
- Darla Hood as Darla
- Eugene Lee as Porky
- George McFarland as Spanky
- Billie Thomas as Buckwheat

=== Additional cast ===
- Tommy Bond as Butch
- Shirley Coates as Muggsy
- Darwood Kaye as Waldo
- Sidney Kibrick as The Woim
- John Davidson as Professor William Delmere, hypnotist
- Phillip Terry as Professor's assistant
- Winstead Weaver as Assistant
- Lester Dorr as Onlooker
- Mary Milford as Onlooker
- Becky Bohanon as Extra
- Priscilla Lyon as Extra
- Allan Randall as Extra
- Jo-Jo La Savio as Extra
- Ruth Tobey as Extra

== See also ==
- Our Gang filmography
