= Time Out for Lessons =

- Directed by: Edward Cahn; Bud Murray
- Written by: Hal Law; Robert A. McGowan
- Produced by: Jack Chertok for MGM
- Cinematography: Robert Planck
- Edited by: Ralph E. Goldstien
- Distributed by: MGM
- Release date: December 2, 1939
- Running time: 10:49
- Country: United States
- Language: English

Time Out for Lessons is a 1939 Our Gang short comedy film directed by Edward Cahn. It was the 185th Our Gang short to be released.

== Plot ==
Afalfa is preparing for a football game with the gang before his father takes him aside to talk about his poor grades. Alfalfa is told that he has a lot of Grade "D" on his tests and unless he improves his academic standing he'll never get to college. Alfalfa responds, "Don't 'D' stand for 'Dandy'?" He then informs his father that he intends to sail through college on a football scholarship. His father then puts forth an illustration to Alfalfa who imagines that he is a student at "Hale University" (a spoof of Yale University) and that he is a big football star with poor grades. During his dream about future gridiron triumphs, Alfalfa is brought down to earth when he envisions himself being disqualified by his professor from the inevitable "big game" due to his lousy grades. After picturing this scenario our hero vows to put football on the back burner in favor of cracking the books. His father encourages him to balance them out and not neglect one for the other. So, while Alfalfa doesn't give up football, he promises and encourages the gang to take "Time Out For Lessons".

== Cast ==
=== The Gang ===
- Carl Switzer as Alfalfa
- Mickey Gubitosi as Mickey
- Darla Hood as Darla
- George McFarland as Spanky
- Billie Thomas as Buckwheat
- Shirley Coates as Muggsy
- Darwood Kaye as Waldo
- Leonard Landy as Leonard

=== Additional cast ===
- Gloria Brown as Spanky's dance partners
- Hugh Chapman as Kid encouraging Leonard
- Paul Hilton as Roommate
- Dickie Humphries as Kid encouraging Buckwheat
- Valerie Lee as Mickey's dance partner
- Si Wills as Alfalfa's father

=== College extras ===
Joe "Corky" Geil, James Gubitosi, Jovanni Gubitosi, Janice Hood, Jackie Horner, Payne Johnson, Larry Kert, Sidney Kibrick, Rae-Nell Laskey, Gerald Mackey, Tommy McFarland, Glenn Mickens, Priscilla Montgomery, Betty Ann Muir, Jo-Jo La Savio, Harold Switzer

== Notes ==
- The film was the last appearance of Sidney Kibrick. He was initially a background character while his older brother Leonard was the gang bully. After his brother leaves, Sidney is teamed up with a new bully, Butch, played by Tommy Bond. Sidney becomes known as "Woim". His last episode as Butch's sidekick had been Captain Spanky's Showboat.
- Features an instrumental version of "The Jitterbug", a song written (but removed) from The Wizard of Oz.

== See also ==
- Our Gang filmography
