= Fishy Tales =

1937 film

- Title card
- Directed by: Gordon Douglas
- Produced by: Hal Roach
- Starring: Eugene Lee; George McFarland; Carl Switzer
- Cinematography: Art Lloyd
- Edited by: William H. Ziegler
- Music by: Marvin Hatley
- Distributed by: MGM
- Release date: August 28, 1937
- Running time: 10' 30"
- Country: United States
- Language: English

Fishy Tales is a 1937 Our Gang short comedy film directed by Gordon Douglas. and written by Jack Jevne. starring Eugene Lee, George McFarland, and Carl Switzer. It was the 157th Our Gang short to be released.

== Cast ==
=== The Gang ===
- Eugene Lee as Porky
- George McFarland as Spanky
- Carl Switzer as Alfalfa
- Billie Thomas as Buckwheat
- Gary Jasgur as Junior

=== Additional cast ===
- Tommy Bond as Butch
- Sidney Kibrick as Woim
- Darla Hood as Darla

=== Audience extras ===
John Collum, Barbara Goodrich, Darwood Kaye, Tommy McFarland, Billy Minderhout, Dickie De Nuet, Harold Switzer

== See also ==
- Our Gang filmography
