= Practical Jokers =

- Directed by: George Sidney
- Written by: Hal Law; Robert A. McGowan
- Produced by: Jack Chertok for MGM
- Starring: Darla Hood; Eugene Lee; George McFarland; Carl Switzer; Billie Thomas; Tommy Bond; Gary Jasgur; Sidney Kibrick; Leonard Landy; Marie Blake
- Distributed by: Metro-Goldwyn-Mayer
- Release date: December 17, 1938
- Running time: 8:24
- Country: United States
- Language: English

Practical Jokers is a 1938 Our Gang short comedy film directed by George Sidney. It was the 174th Our Gang short to be released.

== Plot ==
Hoping to get even for all the practical jokes perpetrated by neighborhood troublemaker Butch, the Gang plans to sabotage Butch's birthday party. The weapon of choice is a firecracker, which is substituted for one of the birthday candles. Unfortunately, the kids in general and Alfalfa in particular are unable to escape from the party before the big (and tasty) explosion.

== Cast ==
=== The Gang ===
- Darla Hood as Darla
- Eugene Lee as Porky
- George McFarland as Spanky
- Carl Switzer as Alfalfa
- Billie Thomas as Buckwheat

=== Additional cast ===
- Tommy Bond as Butch
- Gary Jasgur as Gary
- Sidney Kibrick as Woim
- Leonard Landy as Leonard
- Marie Blake as Butch's mother
- June Preston Party attendee
- Joe Levine as Party extra

== See also ==
- Our Gang filmography
