= The Big Premiere =

- Directed by: Edward Cahn
- Written by: Hal Law; Robert A. McGowan
- Produced by: Jack Chertok; Richard Goldstone
- Starring: George McFarland; Carl Switzer; Darla Hood; Billie Thomas; Mickey Gubitosi; Shirley Coates; Darwood Kaye; Ethelreda Leopold; John Dilson; Eddie Gribbon
- Cinematography: Paul C. Vogel
- Edited by: Adrienne Fazan
- Music by: David Snell
- Distributed by: Metro-Goldwyn-Mayer
- Release date: March 9, 1940
- Running time: 10:30
- Country: United States
- Language: English

The Big Premiere is a 1940 Our Gang short comedy film directed by Edward Cahn. It was the 188th Our Gang short to be released.

== Plot ==
The gang unintentionally wreaks havoc at the gala Hollywood premiere of the adventure epic Gun Boats. Chased away by the angry authorities, the undaunted kids decide to stage their own movie premiere—and they even film a movie for the occasion. Unfortunately, the gang's cinematic effort, entitled The Mysteeryus Mystery, is not as entertaining as the efforts by Buckwheat to remove his feet from a block of cement.

== Cast ==
=== The Gang ===
- Mickey Gubitosi as Mickey
- Darla Hood as Darla
- George McFarland as Spanky
- Carl Switzer as Alfalfa
- Billie Thomas as Buckwheat
- Shirley Coates as Muggsy
- Darwood Kaye as Waldo

=== Additional cast ===
- John Dilson as theater owner
- Eddie Gribbon as police officer
- Ethelreda Leopold as Irma Acacia

=== Barn extras ===
Giovanna Gubitosi, James Gubitosi, Larry Harris, Arthur Mackey, Tommy McFarland, Harold Switzer, Clyde Wilson

== See also ==
- Our Gang filmography
