= Auto Antics =

1939 American film by Edward L. Cahn

- Directed by: Edward Cahn
- Written by: Hal A. Law; Robert A. McGowan
- Produced by: Jack Chertok for MGM
- Starring: Darla Hood; Eugene Lee; George McFarland; Carl Switzer; Billie Thomas; Mickey Gubitosi; Leonard Landy; Tommy Bond; Sidney Kibrick
- Cinematography: Harold Marzorati
- Edited by: Roy Brickner
- Distributed by: MGM
- Release date: July 22, 1939
- Running time: 10:05
- Country: United States
- Language: English

Auto Antics is a 1939 American short comedy film in the Our Gang series directed by Edward Cahn. It was written by Hal A. Law and Robert A. McGowan and was the 182nd Our Gang short to be released.

== Plot ==
Banners proclaim "Greenpoint's Proudest Day! – Mammoth Celebration Dedicating Our New Sewer System", featuring the Kidmobile Race with a first prize of five dollars.Our Gang's hopes to win the race are nearly dashed when town bully Butch arranges for the gang's pet dog Whiskers to be picked up by the dog pound. But instead of demoralizing the gang, the impoundment of Whiskers merely gives them a stronger reason to win the race and claim the prize, with which they will pay the dog's license fee. There is no shortage of dirty tricks on the part of Butch and his henchman Woim, who try everything to wreck the Gang's chances and their homemade "auto."

== Cast ==
=== The Gang ===
- Darla Hood as Darla
- Eugene Lee as Porky
- George McFarland as Spanky
- Carl Switzer as Alfalfa
- Billie Thomas as Buckwheat
- Mickey Gubitosi as Mickey
- Leonard Landy as Leonard

=== Additional cast ===
- Tommy Bond as Butch
- Sidney Kibrick as Woim
- Baldwin Cooke as Luke
- Major James H. McNamara as Mayor of Greenpoint
- Joe Whitehead as dogcatcher

== Notes ==
Auto Antics features the final appearance of Eugene "Porky" Lee, who was dismissed from the series after growing significantly taller (to the point that he became taller than George "Spanky" McFarland) during Our Gang's first year at MGM. Robert Blake, who had just replaced Gary Jasgar as the tag-along toddler, assumed the role vacated by Porky at the beginning of Our Gang's 1939–40 season of shorts.

Darla Hood became ill during the filming of Auto Antics. One shot features the kids hanging on to the back of the dogcatchers' truck as it starts down the road. Carl "Alfalfa" Switzer was, according to Hood in a later interview, "in one of his little moods" and ruined every take of that shot. At the end of the thirty-second take, Hood passed out from the exhaust fumes and had to be escorted to the hospital.

== Reception ==
Kine Weekly wrote: "A racing fixture for home-made toy autos. As funny for the youngsters as Our Gang pictures invariably are. Ideal for juvenile programmes."

== See also ==
- Our Gang filmography
