= Came the Brawn =

1938 film

- Film poster
- Directed by: Gordon Douglas
- Produced by: Hal Roach
- Starring: Carl Switzer; Tommy Bond; Darla Hood; George McFarland; Billie Thomas; Eugene Lee; Darwood Kaye; Sidney Kibrick
- Cinematography: Art Lloyd
- Edited by: William H. Ziegler
- Music by: Leroy Shield
- Distributed by: MGM
- Release date: April 16, 1938
- Running time: 11 minutes
- Country: United States
- Language: English

Came the Brawn is a 1938 Our Gang short comedy film directed by Gordon Douglas. Produced by Hal Roach and released to theaters by Metro-Goldwyn-Mayer, it was the 165th entry in the Our Gang series.

== Notes ==
Came the Brawn marked Spanky McFarland's, Tommy "Butch" Bond's, Sidney "Woim" Kibrick's, and Darwood "Waldo" Kaye's final appearances in the Hal Roach-produced Our Gang shorts. Butch, Woim, and Waldo were recurring characters and would not be needed for the last three episodes but would all return for The Little Ranger, the first Our Gang short produced after the series' sale to MGM in mid-1938.

Spanky's contract expired after the completion of Came the Brawn, and he officially retired from the series at this time. After going on a personal tour, Spanky rejoined Our Gang in the late summer of 1938, after its transfer to MGM. He would remain another four and a half years.

== Cast ==
=== The Gang ===
- Darla Hood as Darla
- Eugene Lee as Porky
- George McFarland as Spanky
- Carl Switzer as Alfalfa
- Billie Thomas as Buckwheat

=== Additional cast ===
- Tommy Bond as Butch
- Darwood Kaye as Waldo
- Sidney Kibrick as Woim
- Henry Lee as Spike
- Billy Minderhout as Kid with big eyes
- Roger Terry as 'Wise fella'
- Ernest Wechbaugh as Kid with too much muscle
- Betsy Gay as Effie (scene deleted)

=== Audience extras ===
Patsy Currier, Charles Flickinger, Joe Geil, Paul Hilton, Cheryl Hopper, Tommy McFarland, Dicke De Nuet, Raymond Rayhill Powell, Spencer Quinn, Drew Roddy, Harold Switzer, Voigt Williams, David Wilmot

== See also ==
- Our Gang filmography
