= Rushin' Ballet =

1937 film

- Film poster
- Directed by: Gordon Douglas
- Produced by: Hal Roach
- Starring: George McFarland; Carl Switzer; Billie Thomas; Eugene Lee; Tommy Bond; Sidney Kibrick; Darla Hood; Darwood Kaye; Harold Switzer; John Collum; Kathryn Sheldon
- Cinematography: Art Lloyd
- Edited by: William H. Ziegler
- Music by: Marvin Hatley
- Distributed by: MGM
- Release date: April 24, 1937
- Running time: 10:39
- Country: United States
- Language: English

Rushin' Ballet is a 1937 Our Gang short comedy film directed by Gordon Douglas. It was the 154th Our Gang short to be released.

== Plot ==
When Porky and Buckwheat have their marbles stolen by the school bully Butch and his minion Woim, they go to Spanky and Alfalfa at the Secret Revenger's Club. Incurring the wrath of the bullies by throwing tomatoes at them, Spanky and Alfalfa try to avoid them by donning skirts and hiding among the ballet chorus. Butch is so eager for mayhem that he does the same thing. The result is a rather unique ballet that has the audience in stitches...and the school faculty in agony. By the end of their rather unique ballet, which resulted in Alfalfa getting the marbles back, Porky and Buckwheat get their payback on Butch and Woim by throwing tomatoes at them as the bullies bow to the audience.

== Cast ==
=== The Gang ===
- Eugene Lee as Porky
- George McFarland as Spanky
- Carl Switzer as Alfalfa
- Billie Thomas as Buckwheat

=== Additional cast ===
- Tommy Bond as Butch
- Sidney Kibrick as Woim
- Darla Hood as Dancer
- Darwood Kaye as Boy dancer
- Harold Switzer as Boy dancer
- Gloria Brown as Ballet dancer
- Elaine Merk as Ballet dancer
- Camille Williams as Ballet dancer
- Kathryn Sheldon as Harried dance recital teacher
- John Collum as Boy in audience

== See also ==
- Our Gang filmography
