= Pay as You Exit =

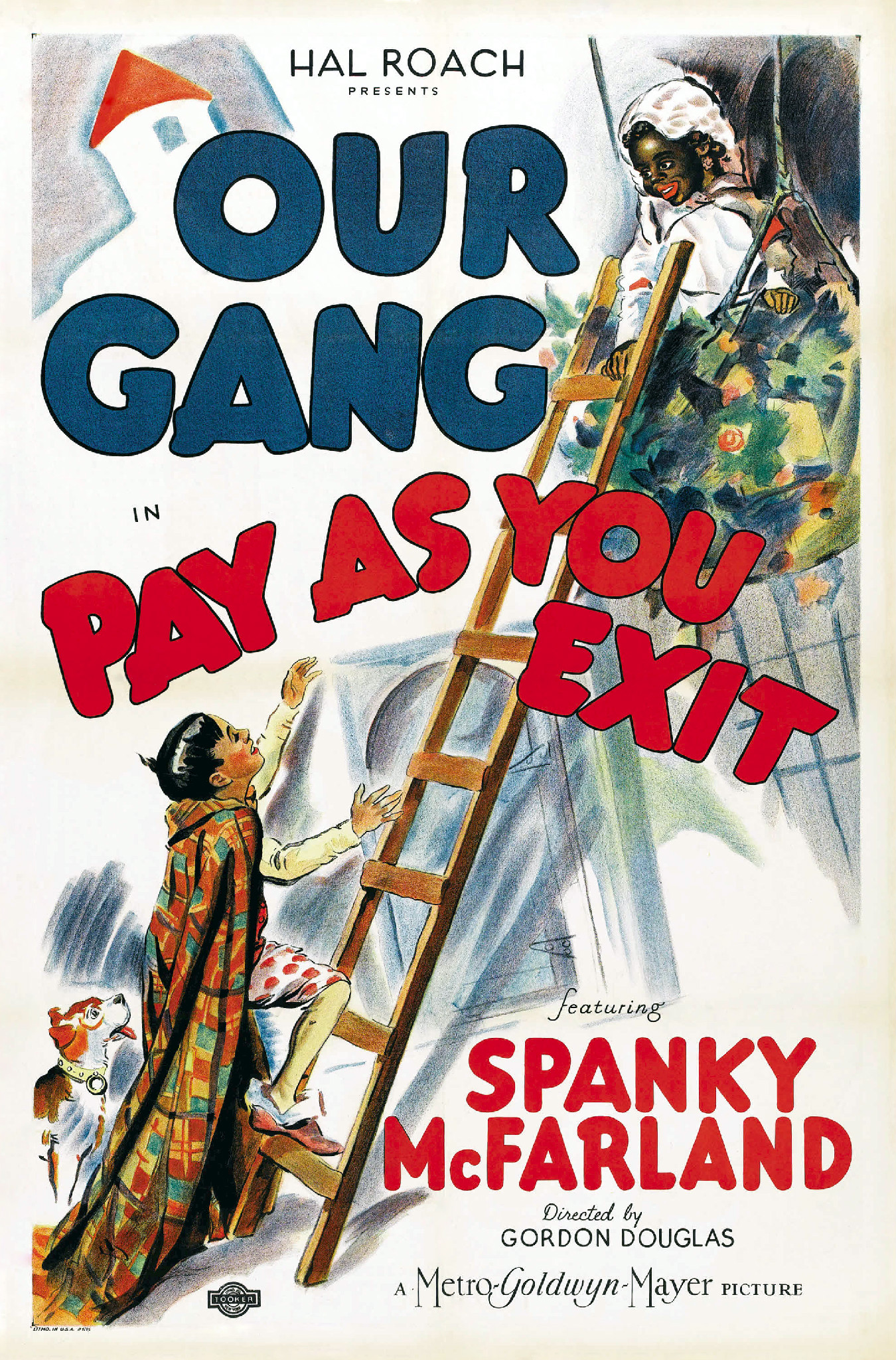
- Film poster
- Directed by: Gordon Douglas
- Produced by: Hal Roach
- Cinematography: Walter Lundin
- Edited by: William H. Ziegler
- Music by: Leroy Shield; Marvin Hatley
- Distributed by: Metro-Goldwyn-Mayer
- Release date: October 24, 1936
- Running time: 10:27
- Country: United States
- Language: English

Pay as You Exit is a 1936 Our Gang short comedy film directed by Gordon Douglas. It was the 148th Our Gang short to be released.

== Plot ==
Hoping to attract customers to Spanky's barnyard production of Romeo and Juliet, star performer Alfalfa proposes a "pay as you exit" policy: If the kids like the show, they will pay the allotted "one penny" admission on the way out.

The performance is nearly over before it starts when leading lady Darla walks out, complaining that Alfalfa has been eating onions (which, he insists, improves his splendid speaking voice.) Spanky stalls for time in a cute weight-lifting act. Alfalfa hits upon a replacement for Darla: Buckwheat, decked out in a lovely blonde wig and Juliet costume. When the kids in the audience recognize him, they clap and cheer and call out, "It's Buckwheat! Hooray for Buckwheat!"

However, the ladder Alfalfa is standing on gives way; Buckwheat saves him before he falls. When the ladder gives way again, Alfalfa tells Buckwheat to hold on tight, but the aroma of onions gets to Buckwheat, causing him to let go. As the ladder weaves, Spanky drops the curtain and Alfalfa and the ladder then tear through it and into the audience, much to their laughing delight.

When the audience leaves, Spanky admonishes him for his "pay as you exit" scheme. But pay they did and Alfalfa and Spanky eat onions as a toast to their success.

== Notes ==
- Joe Cobb, an Our Gang star from the series' silent days, makes a return appearance.
- Among the incidental music played on the Victrola by stagehand Porky in the course of the show are LeRoy Shield's familiar background tunes "In My Canoe" and "Hide and Go Seek", as well as "Walking the Deck", a tune written for the 1936 Laurel and Hardy feature Our Relations.
- The Buckwheat character was originally a girl, but had morphed into a boy by this episode, appearing for the first time in his new costuming—overalls, striped shirt, oversized shoes, and a large unkempt Afro—which was retained for the series until the end.

== Cast ==
=== The Gang ===
- Darla Hood as Darla
- Eugene Lee as Porky
- George McFarland as Spanky
- Carl Switzer as Alfalfa
- Billie Thomas as Buckwheat

=== Additional cast ===
- Joe Cobb as Leader of the audience kids

=== Audience extras ===
John Collum, Rex Downing, Jack Egger, Paul Hilton, Sidney Kibrick, Harold Switzer, Marvin Strin, Robert Winckler

== See also ==
- Our Gang filmography
