= Framing Youth =

1937 film

- Directed by: Gordon Douglas
- Produced by: Hal Roach
- Cinematography: Art Lloyd
- Edited by: William H. Ziegler
- Music by: Marvin Hatley
- Distributed by: MGM
- Release date: September 11, 1937
- Running time: 11 minutes
- Country: United States
- Language: English

Framing Youth is a 1937 Our Gang short comedy film directed by Gordon Douglas. It was the 158th Our Gang short to be released.

== Cast ==
=== The Gang ===
- Carl Switzer as Alfalfa
- Billie Thomas as Buckwheat
- Darla Hood as Darla
- Eugene Lee as Porky
- George McFarland as Spanky
- Gary Jasgur as Junior

=== Additional cast ===
- Tommy Bond as Butch
- Ernie Alexander as Usher
- Jack Mulhall as Radio Announcer
- Olive Brasno as Singing voice over (voice)
- The Meglin Kiddies as Singing voice overs (voice)
- John Collum as Audience extra
- Harold Switzer as Extra

== Review ==
"'Framing Youth' is [sic] short and sweet. Despite its brief running time, there is introductory material, exposition, a crisis, a climax, and an ideal conclusion. Everything clicks."

== See also ==
- List of American films of 1937
- Our Gang filmography
