= Captain Spanky's Showboat =

Captain Spanky's Show Boat
- Directed by: Edward Cahn
- Written by: Hal A. Law; Robert A. McGowan
- Produced by: Jack Chertok for MGM
- Starring: Our Gang; Robert BlakeT ommy Bond
- Cinematography: Robert Pittack
- Edited by: Roy Brickner
- Music by: David Snell
- Distributed by: MGM
- Release date: September 9, 1939
- Running time: 10:42
- Country: United States
- Language: English

Captain Spanky's Show Boat is a 1939 Our Gang short comedy film directed by Edward Cahn. It was the 183rd Our Gang short to be released.

== Plot ==
Once again, the gang stages an elaborate musical show in Spanky's backyard. Angered over the fact that Alfalfa has been chosen as the show's singing star, bully Tommy Butch sneaks backstage with the intention of sabotaging the production. But Butch is hoisted on his own petard, and the show goes on as scheduled.

== Cast ==
=== The Gang ===
- George McFarland as Spanky
- Mickey Gubitosi as Mickey
- Darla Hood as Darla
- Carl Switzer as Alfalfa
- Billie Thomas as Buckwheat
- Shirley Coates - Muggsy
- Leonard Landy - Leonard

=== Additional cast ===
- Tommy Bond as Butch
- Sidney Kibrick as Woim
- Buddy Boles as Violinist
- George Crosby as One of Darla's dance partners
- Darwood Kaye as Waldo
- Clyde Wilson as Boy introducing acts
- Tim Davis as Extra
- Spencer Quinn as Extra

== See also ==
- Our Gang filmography
