= Spooky Hooky =

1936 film

- Directed by: Gordon Douglas
- Written by: Hal Roach
- Produced by: Hal Roach
- Starring: George McFarland; Carl Switzer; Billie Thomas; Eugene Lee; Dudley Dickerson; Rosina Lawrence; Laughing Gravy
- Cinematography: Art Lloyd
- Edited by: William H. Ziegler
- Music by: Leroy Shield; Marvin Hatley
- Distributed by: Metro-Goldwyn-Mayer
- Release date: December 5, 1936
- Running time: 10:17
- Country: United States
- Language: English

Spooky Hooky is a 1936 Our Gang short comedy film directed by Gordon Douglas. It was the 149th Our Gang short to be released.

== Plot ==
When Alfalfa, Spanky, Buckwheat and Porky become bored with school, they decide to fake an illness for the next day and leave a note on their teacher Miss Lawrence's desk so that they can go to the circus, which they had just seen arrive in town. However, when Miss Lawrence reveals that she plans on taking the class to the circus the next day, Spanky tries to hurry back to the school to retrieve the note, but Porky and Buckwheat return and lock the door behind them before Spanky is able to make it to the door. Now with no way to get back in the school, the boys decide to sneak into the school later that night to recover the note. What follows is a series of scared chaos that the boys and the school's janitor encounter.

The boys do succeed in recovering the note; however, in the final scene, each of the four boys are shown in a four-way split-screen taking a cold medicine the next morning as their mothers declare in unison, "For the last time, you can't go to school today," indicating that the disappointed boys are now really sick and cannot go to school on the day of the circus.

== Cast ==
=== The Gang ===
- George McFarland as Spanky
- Carl Switzer as Alfalfa
- Billie Thomas as Buckwheat
- Eugene Lee as Porky

=== Additional cast ===
- Dudley Dickerson as Sam, the janitor
- Rosina Lawrence as Miss Lawrence
- Laughing Gravy as himself

=== Schoolyard extras ===
Patsy Barry, John Collum, Paul Hilton, Sidney Kibrick, Jackie Lindquist, Dickie De Nuet, Donald Proffitt, Harold Switzer, Robert Winckler

== See also ==
- Our Gang filmography
