= Mail and Female =

1937 film

- Title card
- Directed by: Fred C. Newmeyer
- Produced by: Hal Roach
- Starring: George McFarland; Carl Switzer; Billie Thomas; Eugene Lee; Darla Hood; Henry Lee
- Cinematography: Art Lloyd
- Edited by: William H. Ziegler
- Music by: Marvin Hatley
- Distributed by: MGM
- Release date: November 13, 1937
- Running time: 10 minutes
- Country: United States
- Language: English

Mail and Female is a 1937 Our Gang short comedy film directed by Fred C. Newmeyer. It was the 160th Our Gang short to be released.

== Plot ==
The Gang's male members, headed by Spanky, decided to create the "He-Man Woman Haters Club" in reaction to not being invited to one of the girl's parties. When the kids ask for a president, Spanky elects his pal Alfalfa without his authorization, under the notion that Alfalfa "hates women". Yet, Alfalfa's absence to the meeting was due to the fact that he was writing a letter to his sweetheart Darla.

Alfalfa is informed by Buckwheat and Porky that he has been unanimously elected president of Spanky's new club. Before Alfalfa proceeds to the barn, he requests that Buckwheat and Porky are to deliver the note and he requests it be "under the hat". Misunderstanding the phrase "Under the hat", Buckwheat puts Alfalfa's letter under his hat.

Upon arriving at the club, Alfalfa is greeted with cheers. Not knowing what the club is, Alfalfa commands the members to follow the rules; if they fail to do so, they will suffer a paddling from "sergeant-at-arms" Spike, to whom Alfalfa has presented the "official paddle." When Alfalfa asks Spanky what the club is about, Spanky delivers the news that he is the head of the "He-Man Woman Haters Club" and is forbidden to look, talk, walk with or send letters to girls. Upon figuring this out, Alfalfa says that he has important business to attend to, and leaves the club to look for Buckwheat and Porky. Upon finding Buckwheat and Porky, they inform Alfalfa that they did what they were told. Alfalfa proceeds to Darla's house to retrieve the note before his fellow members discover that he has broken the rules he's enforced. When asking Darla to give back the note, she responds that she does not know what note he is talking about. At this time, Buckwheat and Porky inform Spanky that Alfalfa is going to Darla's house. Spanky, Spike, Buckwheat and Porky decide to investigate, with Spike taking along the paddle.

Alfalfa spots Spanky, Spike, Buckwheat and Porky coming toward Darla's house, where he is still visiting. In desperation, Alfalfa hides in a closet and asks Darla not to give away his hiding spot. When the members arrive, they ask Darla if Alfalfa has been over. Upon denying that she saw him that day, the members search the house in order to find Alfalfa. After giving up, Alfalfa makes a noise in the closet he was in, giving away his position. When the members open the closet, they find "Darla's cousin" Amelia who was from New York, who is just Alfalfa dressed in woman's clothing. "Amelia" offers the members some ice cream which they accept. The boys begin to like Amelia and admit to liking her when she asks. When "Amelia" steps out to bring back lemonade, Alfalfa comes back angered at his members, grabs the paddle, and proceeds to order the boys to line up to be paddled. He goes down the line, paddling Spike (who complains that he's the sergeant-at-arms) and then Spanky. But when he orders Buckwheat to stoop over to receive his paddling, as he stoops over his hat falls off exposing Alfalfa's love letter, which Spanky picks up. In anger, Spanky tells the boys to get Alfalfa. In fear, Alfalfa jumps out the window into a pool, where he is humiliated when the others stand at the window and laugh at him.

== Cast ==
=== The Gang ===
- Carl Switzer as Alfalfa / Cousin Amelia
- Darla Hood as Darla
- Eugene Gordon Lee as Porky
- George McFarland as Spanky
- Billie Thomas as Buckwheat
- Henry Wesley Lee as Spike

== See also ==
- Our Gang filmography
