= Kiddie Kure =

1940 film by Edward L. Cahn

- Directed by: Edward Cahn
- Written by: Hal Law; Robert A. McGowan
- Produced by: Jack Chertok; Richard Goldstone for MGM
- Starring: George McFarland; Carl Switzer; Darla Hood; Billie Thomas; Mickey Gubitosi; Billy Laughlin; Thurston Hall; Gerald Oliver Smith; Edwin Stanley
- Cinematography: Jackson Rose
- Edited by: Leon Borgeau
- Distributed by: Metro-Goldwyn-Mayer
- Release date: November 23, 1940
- Running time: 10:46
- Country: United States
- Language: English

Kiddie Kure is a 1940 American short comedy film directed by Edward Cahn. It was the 194th Our Gang short to be released.

== Plot ==
While playing baseball near the home of wealthy hypochondriac Mr. Morton, the gang inadvertently breaks one of Morton's windows. This mishap coincides with a plan hatched by Morton's wife to get her husband's mind off his imaginary illnesses by adopting some children.

Hoping to prove that he would be an unsuitable parent, Morton pretends that he is crazy, the better to scare away the gang and to dissuade Mrs. Morton from her adoption scheme. Instead, the kids prove to Morton that he does not need all his pills and poultices, thereby giving the old man a new lease on life and a better appreciation of children.

== Cast ==
=== The Gang ===
- Darla Hood as Darla
- Mickey Gubitosi as Mickey
- Billy Laughlin as Froggy
- George McFarland as Spanky
- Carl Switzer as Alfalfa
- Billie Thomas as Buckwheat

=== Additional cast ===
- Rollie and Bobby Jones as Tisket and Tasket
- Thurston Hall as Mr. Bill Morton
- Gerald Oliver Smith as Evans the butler
- Edwin Stanley as Doctor Malcolm Scott
- Josephine Whittel as Mrs. Julie Morton
- Freddie Chapman as Rival team member (scenes deleted)
- Hugh Chapman as Rival team member (scenes deleted)

== Production notes ==
Kiddie Kure is a partial remake of Second Childhood, which starred much of the same cast. It also marked the final appearance of Carl "Alfalfa" Switzer. At 12 years of age, he was the oldest member of the cast.

== See also ==
- Our Gang filmography
