= Little Sinner =

- Directed by: Gus Meins
- Produced by: Hal Roach
- Cinematography: Francis Corby
- Edited by: Louis McManus
- Music by: Leroy Shield
- Distributed by: Metro-Goldwyn-Mayer
- Release date: October 26, 1935
- Running time: 17' 15"
- Country: United States
- Language: English

Little Sinner is a 1935 Our Gang short comedy film directed by Gus Meins. It was the 139th Our Gang short to be released, and the first appearance of two-year old Porky.

== Plot ==
Anxious to go fishing, Spanky skips out of Sunday school, despite the admonitions of his pals Alfalfa, Mildred, Sidney, and Marianne that "Something's going to happen to you." Actually, everything happens to Spanky and his kid brother (Eugene "Porky" Lee) in the course of the morning. Chased out of a private estate by a cantankerous caretaker, the two boys wander into a dark, mysterious woods just as an eclipse occurs and at the same time a large group of Black worshipers are holding a mass baptism ceremony. Some view the baptism and background singing of the Negro spiritual "I Am Leaning on The Lord", which contains the words: "Why don't you come out of the wilderness" as a racist stereotype. However, as Spanky, Porky and Buckwheat are scared out of the woods, a wilderness, it could merely be a play on the song's words for their situation.

Inevitably, the kids scare the worshippers, and vice versa, culminating in a hectic chase.

== Note ==
- Little Sinner was withdrawn from the "Little Rascals" TV package in 1971 due to its racial content. It was reinstated in 1979 with severely edited prints that exclude the eclipse and the baptism. Professor Lisa Yaszek said of the racist depiction, "Apparently somehow these black Americans don't know what an eclipse is, so they have that very stereotypical reaction of confusion and fear, which causes chaos for the boys... the way it plays out is so stereotypical and really horrible." The original version was reinstated for the 2001 to 2003 showings on AMC and the 2016 showings on MeTV.
- This episode marks the first appearance of Eugene Gordon Lee as Porky.

== Cast ==
=== The Gang ===
- Eugene Lee as Porky
- George McFarland as Spanky
- Billie Thomas as Buckwheat
- Carl Switzer as Alfalfa
- Jerry Tucker as Jerry
- Rex Downing as Our Gang member
- Sidney Kibrick as Our Gang member
- Donald Proffitt as Our Gang member
- Jackie Banning as Mary Ann (unconfirmed)

=== Additional cast ===
- Ray Turner as Man at Baptism/Man losing tent
- Clarence Wilson - Property owner
- Barbara Goodrich as Church extra
- Joan Lott as Church extra
- Philip Marley Rock as Church extra
- John Collum as Undetermined role
- Mildred Kornman as Undetermined role
- Dickie De Nuet as Undetermined role
- The Etude Chorus as Singers at Baptism

== See also ==
- Our Gang filmography
- List of films featuring eclipses
