= Steve Donovan, Western Marshal =

1950s TV show

- Also known as: Western Marshal
- Genre: Western
- Starring: Douglas Kennedy; Eddy Waller
- Country of origin: United States
- Original language: English
- No. of seasons: 1
- No. of episodes: 39

Production
- Executive producer: Jack Chertok
- Producer: Harry Poppe
- Camera setup: Single-camera
- Running time: 25 mins.
- Production company: Jack Chertok Television Productions

Original release
- Network: Syndication
- Release: September 24, 1955 – June 16, 1956

Steve Donovan, Western Marshal (also known as Western Marshal) is an American Western television series that aired in syndication from September 24, 1955 to June 6, 1956.

== Cast and characters ==
- Douglas Kennedy as United States Marshal Steve Donovan.
- Eddy Waller as Rusty Lee, assistant of Donovan.

== Production ==
Jack Chertock's Vibar Productions filmed the show on the Iverson Movie Ranch.

== Reception ==
Billboard described the 1951 pilot as "a slick swift-paced item which shows the know-how [producer Jack] Chertok picked up in the course of turning out his Lone Ranger series."

== Steve Donovan, Texas Ranger ==
In July 1952, Consolidated Television Productions began syndication of Steve Donovan, Texas Ranger, which starred Kennedy. Twenty-six 30-minute filmed episodes were available. The program was a Jack Chertok production.
