= Sidney Kibrick =

American child actor (1928–2026)

- Born: Sidney Henry Kibrick; July 2, 1928; Minneapolis, Minnesota, U.S.
- Died: January 3, 2026 (aged 97); Northridge, California, U.S.
- Occupation: Child film actor
- Years active: 1933–1943
- Known for: Our Gang short subjects film series
- Family: Leonard Kibrick (brother)

Sidney Henry Kibrick (July 2, 1928 – January 3, 2026) was an American child actor primarily active in Hollywood of the 1930s, most notable for appearing in the Our Gang short subjects film series, featuring in more than two dozen, between 1933 and 1939. Kibrick was the last living actor who played a featured Our Gang character.

== Early life ==
Kibrick was born July 2, 1928, in Minneapolis, Minnesota. His older brother, Leonard Kibrick, was also an actor who appeared in the Our Gang series.

His family relocated to Los Angeles when he was five. He attended Mount Vernon Junior High School and later studied at the University of Southern California. He was Jewish.

== Career ==
=== Our Gang ===
Kibrick was discovered at Grauman's Chinese Theatre while accompanying his mother. He subsequently appeared in the Our Gang short subjects produced by Hal Roach. He made early uncredited film appearances, including Out All Night (1933), and became a regular member of the series in 1935. From 1937 to 1939, he portrayed "Woim" (a Brooklyn accent vernacular pronunciation of "worm"), the sidekick to the bully "Butch", played by Tommy Bond.

Kibrick left acting at age 15.

=== Later career ===
After leaving the film industry, Kibrick worked as a real estate developer. He remained involved in Our Gang reunions and related events.

== Personal life and death ==
Kibrick lived in Los Angeles. In 2022, he attended an exhibit at the Hollywood Museum marking the 100th anniversary of the Our Gang series and its Blu-ray release.

He died on January 3, 2026, at a hospital in Northridge, Los Angeles, at the age of 97. He was the last living principal cast member of Our Gang.

== Filmography ==
Year	Title	Type	Role
1933	Out All Night	Feature film	Little Boy (uncredited)
1933	The Kid's Last Fight	Short subject	Thug (uncredited)
1933	The Bowery	Feature film	Little boy on pier eating sandwich (uncredited)
1933	Allez Oop	Short subject	Boy watching Buster (uncredited)
1934	Tomorrow's Youth	Feature film	Boy waiting to play baseball (uncredited)
1935	Anniversary Trouble	Short subject	As Our Gang
1935	Beginner's Luck	Short subject	Our Gang member (credited as Our Gang)
1935	Little Papa	Short subject	Our Gang member
1935	Little Sinner	Short subject	Our Gang member (as Our Gang)
1935	Our Gang Follies of 1936	Short subject	Our Gang member (as Our Gang)
1935	Babes in Hollywood	Short subject	Boy (uncredited)
1936	The Pinch Singer	Short subject	Our Gang member (as Our Gang)
1936	The Peppery Salt	Short subject	Boy (uncredited)
1936	Bored of Education	Short subject	Woim
1936	Two Too Young	Short subject	Student
1936	Pay As You Exit	Short subject	Audience member
1937	Reunion in Rhythm	Short subject	Our Gang member
1937	The Great O'Malley	Feature film	Street kid (uncredited)
1937	Glove Taps	Short subject	Woim
1937	Hearts Are Thumps	Short subject	Woim
1937	Rushin' Ballet	Short subject	Woim
1937	Dead End	Feature film	Boy (uncredited)
1937	Fishy Tales	Short subject	Woim
1937	The Pigskin Palooka	Short subject	Spike's sidekick
1937	Nothing Sacred	Feature film	Boy chorister with squirrel
1938	Rawtide	Short subject	Boy playing baseball
1938	Came the Brawn	Short subject	Woim
1938	The Little Ranger	Short subject	Woim
1938	Party Fever	Short subject	Woim
1938	Just Around the Corner	Feature film	Gang member (uncredited)
1938	Football Romeo	Short subject	The Woim
1938	Practical Jokers	Short subject	Woim
1939	Jesse James	Feature film	Boy (uncredited)
1939	Duel Personalities	Short subject	Woim
1939	Cousin Wilbur	Short subject	Woim
1939	Baby Daze	Short subject	Neighbor, boy wearing a fedora (uncredited)
1939	The Jones Family in Hollywood	Feature film	Young boy (uncredited)
1939	Dog Daze	Short subject	Woim
1939	Auto Antics	Short subject	Woim
1939	Captain Spanky's Show Boat	Short subject	Woim
1939	Time Out for Lessons	Short subject	Football player
1940	Music in My Heart	Feature film	Boy (uncredited)
1940	Pier 13	Feature film	Boy catcher
1940	Spring Parade	Feature film	Boy (uncredited)
1940	Little Man	Feature film	Young Danny (uncredited)
1942	The Man Who Returned to Life	Feature film	Newsboy (uncredited)
1942	Flight Lieutenant	Feature film	Pudgy (uncredited)
1943	Keep 'Em Slugging	Feature film	Kid at meeting (uncredited)
