= David Snell (composer) =

American conductor and composer (1897–1967)

David L. Snell
- Born: 10 September 1897; Milwaukee, Wisconsin, US
- Died: 27 March 1967 (aged 69); Glendale, California, US
- Occupation: Composer
- Known for: Shadow of the Thin Man

David L. Snell (10 September 1897 – 27 March 1967) was a pianist, conductor, composer and music director. He composed the music for over 170 shorts, series or feature films for the Metro-Goldwyn-Mayer film studio.

== Early years ==
David L. Snell was born on 10 September 1897 in Milwaukee, Wisconsin. He became a pianist, and studied at the Wisconsin Conservatory of Music, Wisconsin College and the Meyer Conservatory of Music. He formed his own orchestra, and was the musical director for several stage productions.

== Metro-Goldwyn-Mayer music director ==
Snell joined Metro-Goldwyn-Mayer's music department in 1937, turning out music for a range of films from low-cost "B" movies to expensive features. He would spend his entire film career with MGM. He was conductor, composer, and music director for MGM for twenty-one years.' The work could be high pressure. In November 1938 Franz Waxman had just five days to put together the fifty-minute score for A Christmas Carol so it could be released in time for the holiday season. Snell helped out, writing the opening and closing credit cues and half a dozen other cues based on themes provided by Waxman.

Snell wrote music for many full-length films, shorts and B-movie series such as Dr. Kildare, Maisie and The Thin Man.

His songs include Under The Stars, Downstream Drifter, Come Back Little Girl Of Mine and Once Over Lightly.

Snell's scores often showed first-rate craftmanship, but his work has generally been ignored, perhaps because in most cases he chose to simply underscore the dialog as opposed to contributing complementary musical ideas. However, for the 1947 Lady in the Lake, based on the Raymond Chandler novel and set around Christmas time, Snell chose to use a choir singing a cappella without musical accompaniment, providing an austere and effective "black and white" score to accompany the stark black and white cinematography. The moody music echoed Christmas carols.

David L. Snell died at home in Glendale, California on March 27, 1967.

== Filmography ==
Snell is credited as composer in many films, including:

- 1935 Prince, King of Dogs (Documentary short, uncredited)
- 1935 Windy (Short, uncredited)
- 1937 A Family Affair
- 1937 Bars and Stripes (Short)
- 1937 Candid Cameramaniacs (Short, uncredited)
- 1937 Carnival in Paris (Short)
- 1937 Dangerous Number
- 1937 Equestrian Acrobats (Documentary short, uncredited)
- 1937 Madame X
- 1937 Married Before Breakfast
- 1937 My Dear Miss Aldrich
- 1937 Some Time Soon (Short, musical score)
- 1937 Song of Revolt (Short, musical score)
- 1937 The Thirteenth Chair
- 1937 You're Only Young Once
- 1938 Aladdin's Lantern (Short, uncredited)
- 1938 Anaesthesia (Short, uncredited)
- 1938 Billy Rose's Casa Mañana Revue (Short, uncredited)
- 1938 Bravest of the Brave (Short, uncredited)
- 1938 Captain Kidd's Treasure (Short, uncredited)
- 1938 Electrical Power (Documentary short, as Dave Snell)
- 1938 Football Thrills of 1937 (Documentary short, uncredited)
- 1938 Grid Rules (Documentary short, uncredited)
- 1938 Hollywood Goes to Town (Short documentary)
- 1938 Joaquin Murrieta (Short)
- 1938 Judge Hardy's Children
- 1938 Love Finds Andy Hardy (musical score by)
- 1938 Men of Steel (Short, musical score)
- 1938 Music Made Simple (Short, uncredited)
- 1938 Nostradamus (Short)
- 1938 Once Over Lightly (Short, musical score)
- 1938 Out West with the Hardys
- 1938 Party Fever (Short, uncredited)
- 1938 Passing Parade (Short)
- 1938 Snow Gets in Your Eyes (Short, musical score by)
- 1938 Strange Glory (Short)
- 1938 That Mothers Might Live (Short)
- 1938 The Canary Comes Across (Short)
- 1938 The Forgotten Step (Short, uncredited)
- 1938 The Great Heart (Short)
- 1938 The Historical Mystery: Miracle of Salt Lake (Documentary short)
- 1938 The Little Ranger (Short, uncredited)
- 1938 The Magician's Daughter (Short)
- 1938 The Man on the Rock (Short)
- 1938 The World Is Ours (Short, music score)
- 1938 They Live Again (Documentary short)
- 1938 Tracking the Sleeping Death (Short)
- 1938 What Do You Think? (Number Three, Short, uncredited)
- 1938 What Do You Think?: Tupapaoo (Short, as Dave Snell)
- 1938 Young Dr. Kildare
- 1939 Andy Hardy Gets Spring Fever
- 1939 Angel of Mercy (Short)
- 1939 Blackmail
- 1939 Burn 'Em Up O'Connor
- 1939 Calling Dr. Kildare
- 1939 Captain Spanky's Showboat (Short)
- 1939 Dancing Co-Ed
- 1939 Football Thrills of 1938 (Short, uncredited)
- 1939 Happily Buried (Short)
- 1939 Henry Goes Arizona
- 1939 Heroes at Leisure (Documentary short)
- 1939 Ice Antics (Short)
- 1939 Joe and Ethel Turp Call on the President
- 1939 Judge Hardy and Son
- 1939 Marine Circus (Documentary short, uncredited)
- 1939 Miracle at Lourdes (Short)
- 1939 Prophet Without Honor (Short)
- 1939 Radio Hams (Short, uncredited)
- 1939 Somewhat Secret (Short)
- 1939 Stronger Than Desire
- 1939 The Giant of Norway (Short)
- 1939 The Greener Hills (Short, uncredited)
- 1939 The Hardys Ride High
- 1939 The Secret of Dr. Kildare
- 1939 The Story of Alfred Nobel (Short)
- 1939 The Story of Dr. Jenner (Short)
- 1939 The Story That Couldn't Be Printed (Short)
- 1939 The Women
- 1939 These Glamour Girls
- 1939 They All Come Out (uncredited)
- 1939 Thunder Afloat
- 1939 Yankee Doodle Goes to Town (Short)
- 1940 20 Mule Team
- 1940 A Way in the Wilderness (Short)
- 1940 Andy Hardy Meets Debutante
- 1940 Dr. Kildare Goes Home (musical score)
- 1940 Dr. Kildare's Crisis
- 1940 Dr. Kildare's Strange Case
- 1940 Football Thrills of 1939 (Short)
- 1940 Gallant Sons
- 1940 Gold Rush Maisie
- 1940 Hollywood: Style Center of the World (Documentary short)
- 1940 Phantom Raiders
- 1940 Sky Murder
- 1940 Stuffie (Short)
- 1940 The Big Premiere (Short, uncredited)
- 1940 The Ghost Comes Home
- 1940 The Golden Fleecing
- 1940 The Hidden Master (Short)
- 1940 The Man from Dakota
- 1940 Third Finger, Left Hand
- 1940 Wyoming
- 1941 Billy the Kid
- 1941 Down in San Diego
- 1941 Football Thrills of 1940 (Short)
- 1941 Love Crazy
- 1941 Main Street on the March! (Short)
- 1941 Maisie Was a Lady
- 1941 Murder in 3-D (Short, uncredited)
- 1941 Ringside Maisie
- 1941 Shadow of the Thin Man
- 1941 Tarzan's Secret Treasure
- 1941 The Penalty
- 1941 The People vs. Dr. Kildare
- 1941 The Wild Man of Borneo
- 1941 Unholy Partners
- 1941 Washington Melodrama
- 1942 Acro-Batty (Short, uncredited)
- 1942 Born to Sing (uncredited)
- 1942 Flag of Mercy (Short)
- 1942 Football Thrills of 1941 (Short)
- 1942 Grand Central Murder
- 1942 Jackass Mail
- 1942 Kid Glove Killer
- 1942 Melodies Old and New (Short, uncredited)
- 1942 Nazi Agent (uncredited)
- 1942 Northwest Rangers
- 1942 Pacific Rendezvous
- 1942 Sunday Punch (uncredited)
- 1942 Tarzan's New York Adventure
- 1942 The Courtship of Andy Hardy
- 1942 The Greenie (Short, uncredited)
- 1942 The Omaha Trail
- 1942 The Vanishing Virginian
- 1942 The War Against Mrs. Hadley (musical score)
- 1942 Tish
- 1942 Victory Vittles (Short, uncredited)
- 1942 What About Daddy? (Short, uncredited)
- 1943 First Aid (Short, uncredited)
- 1943 The Man from Down Under
- 1943 The Youngest Profession
- 1944 Andy Hardy's Blonde Trouble
- 1944 Barbary Coast Gent
- 1944 Gentle Annie
- 1944 Maisie Goes to Reno
- 1944 Rationing
- 1944 See Here, Private Hargrove
- 1944 Twenty Years After (Short)
- 1945 Between Two Women
- 1945 Dangerous Partners
- 1945 Keep Your Powder Dry
- 1945 The Hidden Eye
- 1945 The Thin Man Goes Home
- 1945 Twice Blessed (uncredited)
- 1945 What Next, Corporal Hargrove?
- 1946 Bad Bascomb
- 1946 Love Laughs at Andy Hardy
- 1946 The Cockeyed Miracle
- 1946 The Show-Off
- 1946 Up Goes Maisie
- 1947 Dark Delusion
- 1947 Killer McCoy
- 1947 Lady in the Lake
- 1947 Merton of the Movies
- 1947 Song of the Thin Man
- 1947 The Mighty McGurk
- 1947 Undercover Maisie
- 1948 A Southern Yankee
- 1948 Alias a Gentleman
- 1948 It Can't Be Done (Short, uncredited)
- 1948 My Old Town (Short, uncredited)

== Sources ==
- Brown, Royal S. (1994). Overtones and Undertones: Reading Film Music. University of California Press. ISBN 978-0-520-08320-2.
- "David Snell". IMDb.
- "Dave Snell". Monstrous Movie Music.
- Helvering, David Allen (2007). Functions of Dialogue Underscoring in American Feature Film. ISBN 978-0-549-23504-0.
- McCarty, Clifford (2000). Film Composers in America: A Filmography, 1911-1970. Oxford University Press. ISBN 978-0-19-511473-7.
- Neumeyer, David; Platte, Nathan (6 December 2011). Franz Waxman's Rebecca: A Film Score Guide. Scarecrow Press. ISBN 978-0-8108-8366-6.
- Phillips, Gene D. (2000). Creatures of Darkness: Raymond Chandler, Detective Fiction, and Film Noir. University Press of Kentucky. p. 108. ISBN 0-8131-2700-9.
