= George Sidney =

American film director and producer (1916–2002)

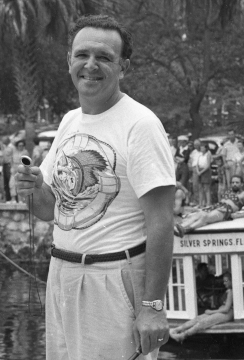
- Sidney while filming 1955's Jupiter's Darling
- Born: October 4, 1916; New York City, U.S.
- Died: May 5, 2002 (aged 85); Las Vegas, Nevada, U.S.
- Occupations: Film director, producer
- Years active: 1937–1967
- Spouses: Lillian Burns (divorced); Jane Robinson (m. 1973–1991); Corinne Entratter Sidney, known also as Corinne Cole (m. 1991–2002)

George Sidney (October 4, 1916 – May 5, 2002) was an American film director and producer who worked primarily at Metro-Goldwyn-Mayer. His work includes cult classics Bye Bye Birdie (1963) and Viva Las Vegas (1964). With an extensive background in acting, stage direction, film editing, and music, Sidney created many of post-war Hollywood's big budget musicals, such as Annie Get Your Gun (1950), Show Boat (1951), Kiss Me Kate (1953), Jupiter's Darling (1955), and Pal Joey (1957). He was also a president of the Screen Directors Guild for 16 years.

A founding partner of Hanna-Barbera animation studio, Sidney was a proponent of the integration of animation into live action, which is immortalized in the dance scene between actor Gene Kelly and Jerry Mouse in Anchors Aweigh (1945). An avid art collector, gardener, musician, painter, and photographer, George Sidney was known for his impeccable sense of style and generosity. His clothing, original scripts, notes, and personal papers are housed in a namesake collection at The Smithsonian National Museum of American History.

== Biography ==
=== Early life ===
George Sidney was born into show business. His father, Louis "L.K." Sidney, was the CEO of the Loew's Incorporated theatre chain. An only child, Sidney tagged along with his father to work at Radio City Music Hall, where he learned the art of choreography, set design, and stage direction. His mother, Hazael Mooney, was a Vaudeville star and half of the aquacade team The Mooney Sisters. Sidney attended Riverdale Country School in the Bronx, New York.

Sidney absorbed the world of New York City theatre and art. At five years old, he played the lead role in The Littlest Cowboy, a 1921 film with western actor Tom Mix.

After a reputed tryst with a showgirl from The Rockettes, Sidney was sent to Los Angeles at age 15 to learn the movie business from the studio head of Metro-Goldwyn-Mayer, Louis B. Mayer. Sidney began as a dog walker and errand boy in the early 1930s.

=== Early career at MGM ===
Sidney soon learned the art of editing at MGM, where he worked alongside aspiring film maker Fred Zinnemann, who went on to direct From Here to Eternity (1953) and Oklahoma! (1955). By the age of 20, Sidney directed many screen tests, with established and aspiring stars, including Errol Flynn, Tyrone Power, Judy Garland and Ava Gardner. Sidney honed his skills with 85 one-reel shorts—a genre that eventually gave him two Academy Awards with "Quicker'n A Wink" (1940) and "Of Pups and Puzzles" (1941).

In 1936 Sidney directed a short called Polo. The following year he made Pacific Paradise with Cliff Edwards, Sunday Night at the Trocadero with Reginald Denny and Billy Rose's Casa Mañana Revue.

In 1938 at age 22, Sidney directed the Our Gang short comedies, which MGM had acquired from Hal Roach upon George's recommendation. Sidney loathed the series and frequently claimed in interviews he was only seven years older than the oldest cast member. Actually, the oldest cast member, semi-regular Tommy Bond was ten years his junior; stars Carl Switzer and Spanky McFarland were eleven and twelve years younger, and the rest of the regular cast was under ten. His credits include Party Fever (1938), Men in Fright (1938), Football Romeo (1938), Practical Jokers (1938), Alfalfa's Aunt (1939), Practical Jokers (1939), Tiny Troubles (1939), Duel Personalities (1939), Clown Princes (1939), Cousin Wilbur (1939), Dog Daze (1939). He also did non Our Gang movies like Love on Tap (1939), Hollywood Hobbies (1939), Loews Christmas Greeting (the Hardy Family) (1939) and A Door Will Open (1940).

Sidney moved on to direct the Crime Does Not Pay series and popular Pete Smith specialties like What's Your IQ? (1940), Quicker'n a Wink (1940), Third Dimensional Murder (1941).

=== Features ===
Sidney made his feature debut with Free and Easy (1941) replacing Edward Buzzell at the last minute. "Nobody else on the lot would do it," he later said. He continued to make shorts like Willie and the Mouse (1941) and Of Pups and Puzzles (1942). His second feature was Pacific Rendezvous (1942) where he was again called in at the last minute to replace another director.

During World War II, Sidney was assigned to the Air Force to supervise the Atomic Energy Commission Film Program at Eniwetok, for which received the Certificate of Merit from the Department of Defense and the Plaque of Honor from the United States Air Force. He was a central figure in the filming of nuclear testing projects.

Sidney directed the war movie Pilot No. 5 (1943) with Franchot Tone which was a minor hit. He then made a string of expensive, popular musicals starting with Thousands Cheer (1943), starring Gene Kelly and Kathryn Grayson and featuring numerous guest appearances . He followed this with Bathing Beauty (1944), Esther Williams' first Techniolor musical, co starring Red Skelton, which was a blockbuster, as was Anchors Aweigh (1945) with Gene Kelly, Grayson and Frank Sinatra. Sidney directed some sequences for Ziegfeld Follies (1945) then made the blockbuster The Harvey Girls (1946), starring Judy Garland and Angela Lansbury. The film introduced Cyd Charisse in her first speaking part. Sidney directed Holiday in Mexico (1946), Jane Powell's first movie for MGM and a solid hit. He was one of several directors on Till the Clouds Roll By (1946).

Sidney had a chance to direct a non musical with the drama Cass Timberlane (1947) with Spencer Tracy and Lana Turner. This was followed by a hugely popular all star adaptation of The Three Musketeers (1948) starring Gene Kelly and Lana Turner. "People thought making The Three Musketeers was ridiculous but it worked," said Sidney. In September 1947 he criticised the spate of psychiatry flms.

Sidney made an anti Communist drama The Red Danube (1949) which was a box office disappointment. More popular was a romantic comedy with Clark Gable and Loretta Young, Key to the City (1951). He returned to musicals with Annie Get Your Gun (1950), where he stepped in to replace Charles Walters as director, and Betty Hutton replaced Judy Garland. It was a hit, as was Show Boat (1951).

Scaramouche (1952) was originally envisioned as a musical but was changed into a straight swashbuckler and was a big hit. It starred Stewart Granger who Sidney worked with on Young Bess (1953). Sidney directed Kiss Me Kate (1953) with Howard Keel and Kathryn Grayson. Keel and Esther Williams were in Jupiter's Darling (1955), which was a notable flop.

=== Columbia ===
Sidney accepted a contract with Columbia in order to make the biopic The Eddy Duchin Story (1956) which was a big hit. In May 1956 it was announced he would leave MGM after 24 years, with ten months to go on his contract, in order to work for his own company, George Sidney Productions; his father would be president. According to Variety "Departure of George Sidney from Metro marks the end of a one-studio success saga spanning a generation. He came to MGM as a messenger boy, rising to become one of the Culver lot’s top film makers."

Sidney's first movie for his own company, Pal Joey (1957), a musical with Frank Sinatra, Kim Novak and Rita Hayworth was a notable success. Columbia financed it, and Sidney's next film, Jeanne Eagels (1957), was another biopic with Novak.

In 1957 it was announced Sidney would make three films for Columbia, Andersonville, The Great Sebastians and Crossroads of the Pacific (from a play by his father). Ultimately, none of them were made.

In 1958 Sidney signed a deal to make three more pictures for the company. The films were Who Was That Lady? (1960) with Dean Martin and Tony Curtis, the all-star Pepe (1960), a vehicle for Cantinflas, and Here Come the Brides. His commitment to Pepe meant that he had to drop out of a Mark Hellinger biopic.

In October 1960 Sidney's deal with Columbia was rewritten so that he had to provide four more films, bringing the total to seven.

In 1961 Sidney announced that he was scheduled to produce five films at Columbia: Return Fare, to be directed by Mel Ferrer; Here Comes the Brides, a musical which he would direct; Lady Is a Dame and Diamond Bikini, which he would also direct; and The Trap, written by Richard Nash.

Sidney directed Bye Bye Birdie (1963) after the original director, Gower Champion, dropped out. The film made a star of Ann-Margret. "That was a great deal of fun," said Sidney. "It was a young people's picture, with a lot of bright, gay, noisy cast members yelling and screaming."

He returned to MGM to make A Ticklish Affair (1964) with Shirley Jones and Viva Las Vegas (1964) with Ann Margret and Elvis Presley; the latter was a huge hit. Sidney made the TV special Who Has Seen the Wind? (1965), then reunited with Ann Margret on The Swinger (1966), a commercial disaster. His last feature as director was Half a Sixpence (1967) with Tommy Steele for Paramount.

In both his technical skill and artistic vision, Sidney stands among the 20th century's most celebrated film directors. He was ranked second 11 years later. Sidney's dedication to the craft of movie making gave his films a visual intensity that captivated the American public.

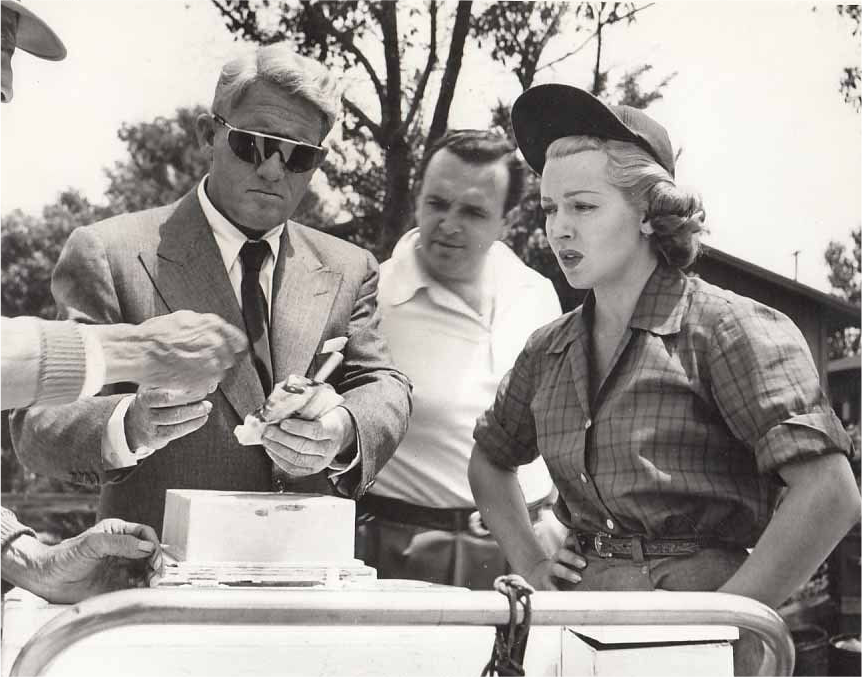
George Sidney behind Spencer Tracy and Lana Turner on the set of Cass Timberlane (1947)

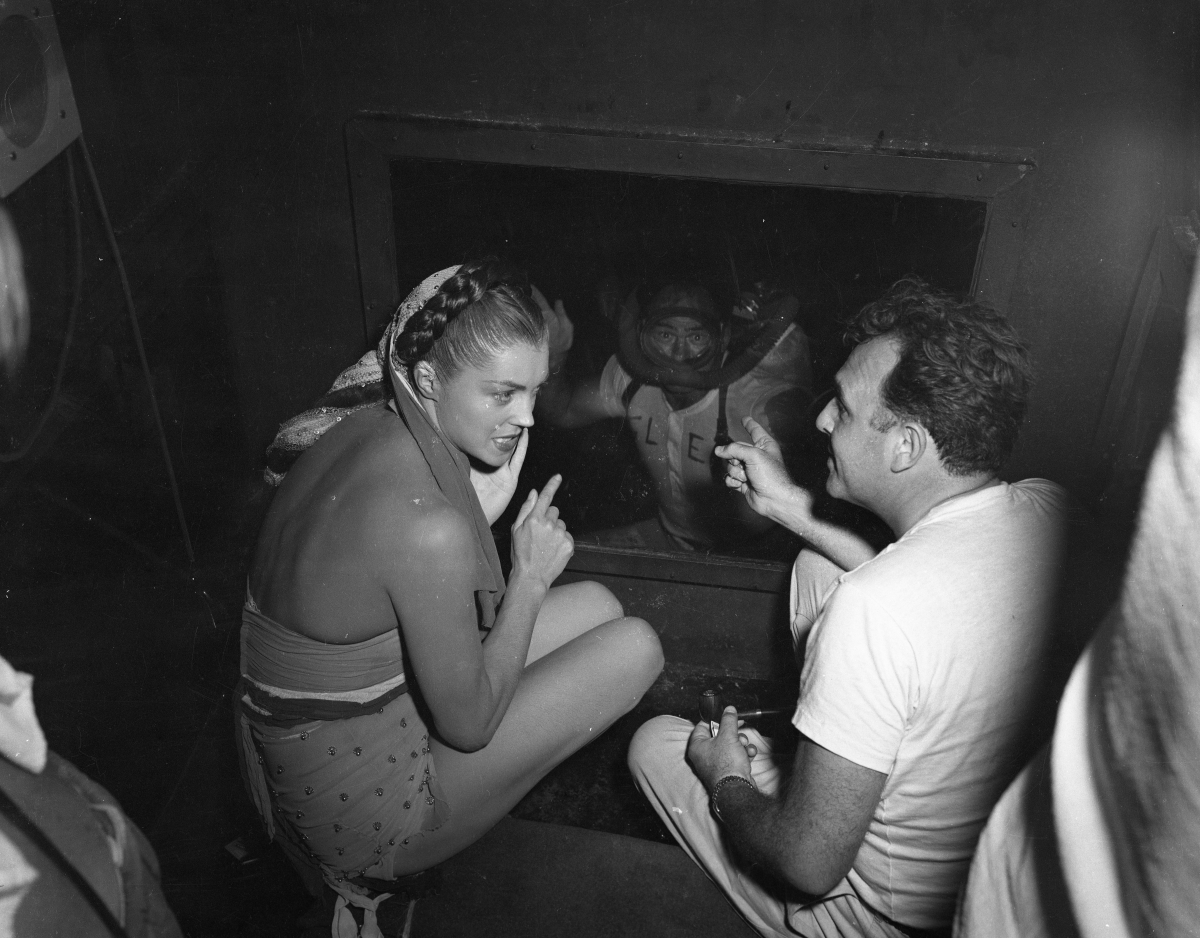
Esther Williams with George Sidney in glass bottom boat during filming of "Jupiter's Darling" at Silver Springs.

== Animation ==
Sidney became good friends with MGM animation directors William Hanna and Joseph Barbera. Hanna and Barbera's Jerry Mouse appeared alongside Gene Kelly in Sidney's film Anchors Aweigh (1945). After MGM closed its animation studio on May 15, 1957, Sidney helped Hanna and Barbera form a deal with Screen Gems, the television division of Columbia Pictures, to form the successful television animation studio Hanna-Barbera Productions, and was a shareholder in the company. Sidney later featured Hanna-Barbera's Fred Flintstone, Barney Rubble, Huckleberry Hound, and Yogi Bear in Bye Bye Birdie (1963).

In 1961, Sidney appeared as himself, along with the canine Lassie in the episode "The Stones Go to Hollywood" of the sitcom The Donna Reed Show. The episode plugged Sidney's then current feature film Pepe, in which Donna Reed made a cameo.

== Professional service, awards and tributes ==
Sidney devoted much of his later life to professional service as a mentor to directors, writers, and educators. Sidney became the youngest president of the Directors Guild of America, having been nominated by his friend, director John Ford. A lifelong learner, Sidney attended law school at the University of Southern California and lectured extensively about film production. George Sidney's work has been celebrated at museums and film festivals around the world: Paris, Barcelona, Helsinki, Moscow, Las Vegas, Palm Springs, Deauville, and Honolulu. He has a star on the Hollywood Walk of Fame. at the Northwest corner of Hollywood Boulevard and Vine. Sidney was nominated for the Directors Guild of America Award four times, starting with the lush Technicolor remake of Show Boat. In 1958, he was presented with a Golden Globe Award for Best World Entertainment through Musical Films.

Posthumously, Sidney's widow, Corinne Entratter Sidney, donated the director's extensive professional archive to the Smithsonian Institution. These artifacts include scripts with handwritten notes, personal correspondence, and his extensive photography collection spanning Sidney's 60-year career in the film industry. A renowned clotheshorse, Sidney was routinely on Mr. Blackwell's Best Dressed List. He was known for his love of Hermes neckwear and British tailoring. His clothing is in the costume collection at Los Angeles County Museum of Art and the Nevada State Museum, Las Vegas.

== Personal life ==
Sidney married drama coach Lillian "Burnsie" Burns Salzer (1903–1998) on 25 December 1941. He was fifteen years her junior. In the late 1970s, he married Jane Adler Robinson (d. 1991), who was the widow of actor Edward G. Robinson (1893–1973). In 1991, Sidney married actress, model and journalist Corinne Kegley Entratter, also known as Corinne Cole, who was the widow of showman and Las Vegas entrepreneur Jack Entratter. Sidney was a prolific photographer. He collected art and was an avid and skilled gardener. Sidney was a member of the Royal Horticultural Society. He died in Las Vegas, Nevada at age 85 from lymphoma on May 5, 2002. His remains was returned to California and entombed at Hillside Memorial Park.

== Awards and nominations ==
Year	Group	Award	Film	Result
1952	Directors Guild of America	Outstanding Directorial Achievement in Motion Pictures	Show Boat	Nominated
1953	Directors Guild of America	Outstanding Directorial Achievement in Motion Pictures	Scaramouche	Nominated
1954	Directors Guild of America	Outstanding Directorial Achievement in Motion Pictures	Young Bess	Nominated
1957	Directors Guild of America	Outstanding Directorial Achievement in Motion Pictures	The Eddy Duchin Story	Nominated
1959	Directors Guild of America	DGA Honorary Life Member Award	-	Won
1986	Directors Guild of America	Robert B. Aldrich Achievement Award	-	Won
1998	Directors Guild of America	President's Award	-	Won
1995	Golden Apple Award	Louella Parsons Award	-	Won
1958	Golden Globe Award	Best World Entertainment Through Musical Films	-	Won
1993	San Luis Obispo International Film Festival	King Vidor Memorial Award	-	Won

== Partial filmography ==
Year	Title	Director	Producer
1943	Pilot #5	Yes	No
1943	Thousands Cheer	Yes	No
1944	Bathing Beauty	Yes	No
1945	Anchors Aweigh	Yes	No
1946	The Harvey Girls	Yes	No
1946	Holiday in Mexico	Yes	No
1947	Cass Timberlane	Yes	No
1948	The Three Musketeers	Yes	No
1949	The Red Danube	Yes	No
1950	Key to the City	Yes	No
1950	Annie Get Your Gun	Yes	No
1951	Show Boat	Yes	No
1952	Scaramouche	Yes	No
1953	Young Bess	Yes	No
1953	Kiss Me Kate	Yes	No
1955	Jupiter's Darling	Yes	No
1956	The Eddy Duchin Story	Yes	No
1957	Jeanne Eagels	Yes	Yes
1957	Pal Joey	Yes	No
1960	Pepe	Yes	Yes
1963	Bye Bye Birdie	Yes	Yes
1963	A Ticklish Affair	Yes	No
1964	Viva Las Vegas	Yes	Yes
1966	The Swinger	Yes	Yes
1967	Half a Sixpence	Yes	Yes

== Bibliography ==
- Davis, Ronald L. (2005). Just Making Movies. University Press of Mississippi. p. 64. ISBN 9781578066902.
- Monder, Eric (1994). George Sidney: Bio-Bibliography. Greenwood Press. ISBN 9780313284571.
