= Darwood Kaye =

American child actor (1929–2002)

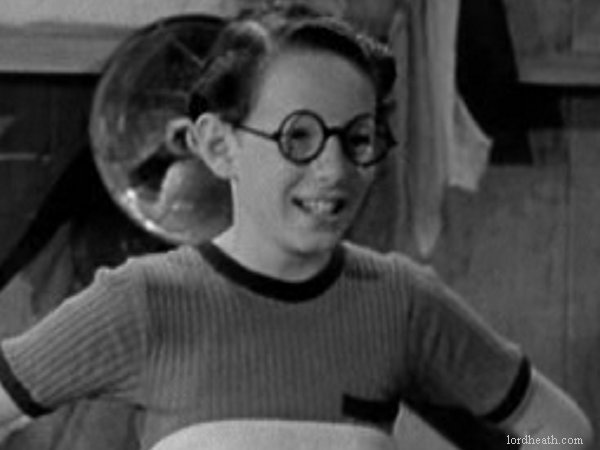
- Born: Darwood Kenneth Smith; September 8, 1929; Fort Collins, Colorado, U.S.
- Died: May 15, 2002 (aged 72); Riverside, California, U.S.
- Occupations: Actor, pastor
- Spouse: Jean Venden
- Children: 4

Darwood Kenneth Smith (September 8, 1929 – May 15, 2002), also known as Darwood Kaye, was an American child actor most notable for his semi-regular role as the bookish rich kid Waldo in the Our Gang short subjects series from 1937 to 1940. As an adult, Smith became a Seventh-day Adventist pastor, ministering at several churches until his death in 2002.

Kaye was discovered in 1935 while his family was on vacation in Hollywood, California; he was asked to come to the studios for a screen test, and made some uncredited appearances in films in 1936.

== Career ==
=== Our Gang ===
Kaye had a small role in Hal Roach's 1937 Our Gang comedy Glove Taps. His first speaking part was in Hearts Are Thumps, released the same year. In most of his Our Gang appearances, Kaye portrayed "Waldo", a rich kid with an officious, studious nature who competed with schoolmates "Alfalfa" Switzer and "Butch" Bond for the affections of little Darla Hood.

Kaye appeared with other Our Gang cast members in live performances in the early 1940s. A 1940 Fort Worth Star-Telegram article about the Our Gang cast said that Kaye and another cast member "display the most essential characteristics of actors in that neither is affected by the constantly unsympathetic roles they must play. Darwood is easily recognizable as a 'regular guy' in any juvenile company and conducts himself with good manners and lack of effrontery which distinguish him from Waldo." According to Variety, he and Switzer performed "an eccentric tap routine which registered well for nice laughs and applause" in San Antonio in late December 1940.

Kaye remained a semi-regular in Our Gang through 1940, by which time production of the series had moved from the Hal Roach studio to Metro-Goldwyn-Mayer. He appeared in a total of 21 Our Gang films. After leaving the Our Gang series Kaye appeared as "Waldo" in Barnyard Follies at Republic Pictures in late 1940. Minor roles in other films included the musical Best Foot Forward (1943) and Kansas City Kitty (1944); in both he played "Killer".

=== As pastor ===
After serving in the U.S. Army for a year and a half, Smith attended La Sierra University, a Seventh-day Adventist college in Riverside, California. He married another student attending La Sierra, Jean Venden, in June 1951, with whom he had four sons: Dan, David, Richard, and Donald.

Smith became a minister in the Seventh-day Adventist Church, ministering at churches in the nearby cities of La Crescenta, San Diego, Palm Springs, Escondido, Santa Maria, Oceanside. and in northern California at the Saint Helena SDA church.

In 1957, the Smiths moved to Siam (present day Thailand), where Darwood, now known as Pastor Ken Smith, did missionary work. Three years later, the couple's fourth son, Donald, was born in Bangkok. The Smiths remained in Thailand for fourteen years before going back to the U.S. permanently. Smith continued his clerical career, ministering in several Southern California churches and supervising missionary work.

== Death and legacy ==
On May 15, 2002, Smith was severely injured in a hit and run crash on Arlington Avenue in Riverside, California. He died later that evening at Riverside Community Hospital, surrounded by his family. He was buried at the Crestlawn Memorial Park in Riverside.

His son David wrote the biography Finding Waldo: From Little Rascal to Adventist Pastor by Darwood Kaye (Pacific Press, 2009).
