= Harold Switzer =

American actor (1925–1967)

Harold "Slim" Switzer
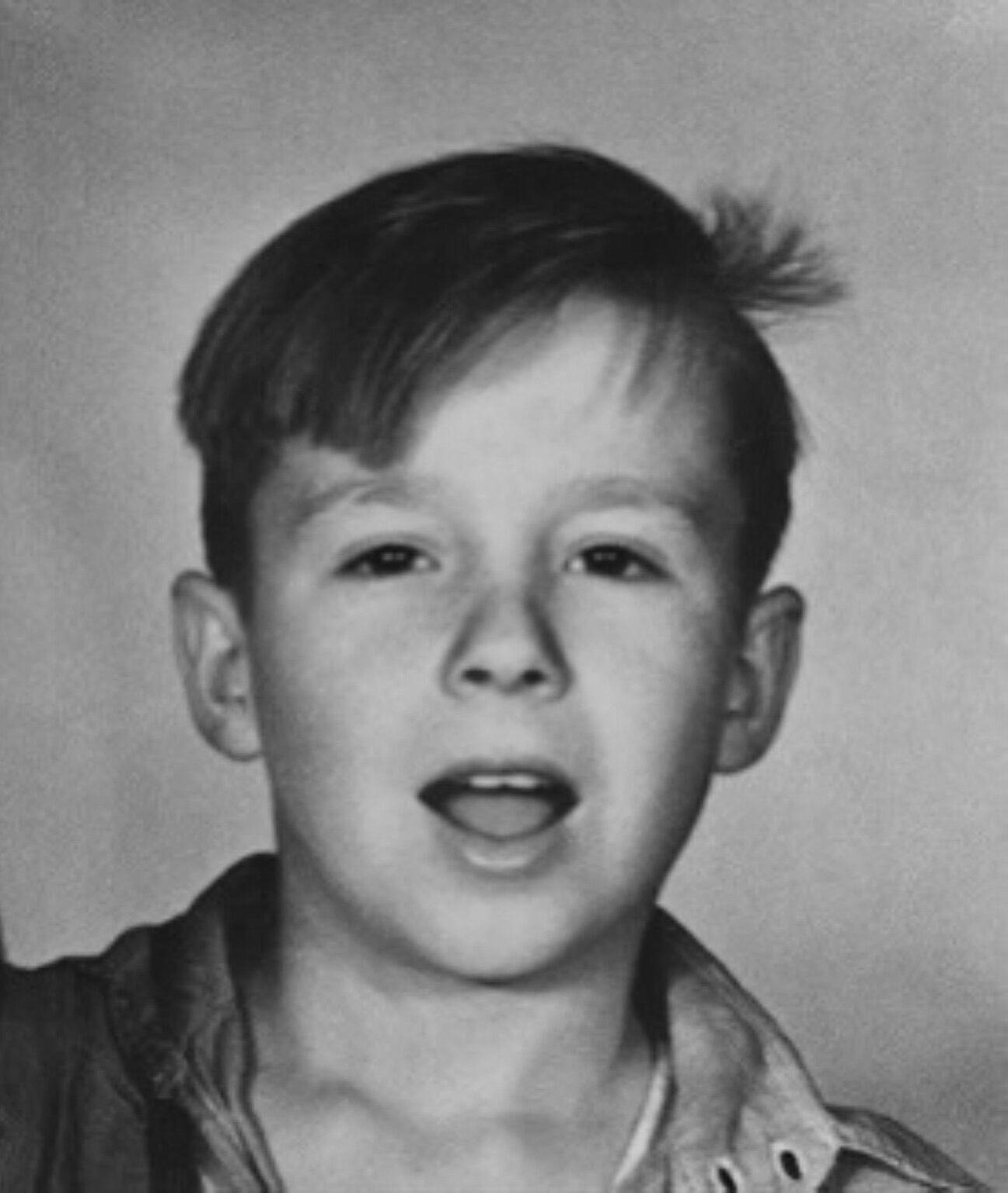
- Switzer in 1936
- Born: Harold Frederick Switzer; January 16, 1925; Paris, Illinois, U.S.
- Died: April 14, 1967 (aged 42); Glendale, California, U.S.
- Resting place: Hollywood Forever Cemetery
- Other names: Slim; Deadpan
- Occupation: Child actor
- Years active: 1935-1967
- Spouse: Beverly Osso (m. 1950; div. 1956)
- Children: 5
- Family: Carl "Alfalfa" Switzer (brother)

Harold Frederick Switzer (January 16, 1925 – April 14, 1967) was an American child actor, most notable for appearing in the Our Gang short subjects series as an extra. He was the older brother of gang member Carl "Alfalfa" Switzer.

== Early life and family ==
Switzer was born in Paris, Illinois, the first son of George Frederick (1905–1960) and Gladys C. Shanks Switzer (1904–1997). He and younger brother, Carl, became famous around their hometown for their musical talent and performances; both sang and played a number of instruments.

== Our Gang ==
The Switzers took a trip to California in 1934 to visit with family members. While sightseeing they eventually wound up at Hal Roach Studios. Following a public tour of the facility, 8-year-old Harold and 6-year-old Carl entered into the Hal Roach Studio's public cafeteria, the Our Gang Café, and began an impromptu performance. Producer Hal Roach was present at the commissary that day and was impressed by the performance. He signed both Switzers to appear in Our Gang. Harold was given two nicknames, "Slim" and "Deadpan," and Carl was dubbed "Alfalfa."

The Switzer brothers first appeared in the 1935 Our Gang short, Beginner's Luck. Harold played the mandolin, while both brothers sang She'll Be Comin' 'Round The Mountain. By the end of the year, due to his comedic timing and appearance, Carl was one of the main characters in the series, while Harold had more or less been relegated to the role of a background player. Harold notably wore a light blue shirt with navy blue overalls. Both Carl and Harold outgrew the series by 1940, with Slim's last appearance in The New Pupil.

== Adult years and death ==
Harold Switzer did not pursue an on-screen career after leaving the Our Gang series, and his Our Gang appearances would remain his only film credits.

Though not saddled with the same problems his younger brother was faced with due to being typecast as a "child star," Harold had his own problems. For several years, he operated a Speed Queen Company franchise, installing and servicing washers and dryers. In 1967, after killing a customer over a dispute, Switzer drove himself to a remote area in Inglewood, California and died by suicide. He was 42.

Harold "Slim" Switzer is interred at the Hollywood Forever Cemetery in Hollywood, California, next to his father, George Frederick Switzer. Carl is on the other side of their father.

== Personal life ==
Switzer was married to Beverly Osso for six years. They had three children: Judith Ann, Tony Frederick and Teddy Berton. Switzer also fathered two children, Gladys and Dawn, with Rose Lavon.

== Filmography ==
- Beginner's Luck
- Teacher's Beau
- Sprucin' Up
- The Lucky Corner
- Our Gang Follies Of 1936
- Divot Diggers
- The Pinch Singer
- Second Childhood
- Arbor Day
- Bored of Education
- Two Too Young
- Pay As You Exit
- General Spanky
- Glove Taps
- Rushin' Ballet
- Fishy Tales
- Framing Youth
- The Pigskin Palooka
- Mail And Female
- Our Gang Follies Of 1938
- Three Men In A Tub
- Came The Brawn
- The Little Ranger
- Party Fever
- Aladdin's Lantern
- Clown Princes
- Cousin Wilbur
- Time Out For Lessons
- The Big Premiere
- The New Pupil
