= Carl "Alfalfa" Switzer =

American actor and singer (1927–1959)

Carl Switzer
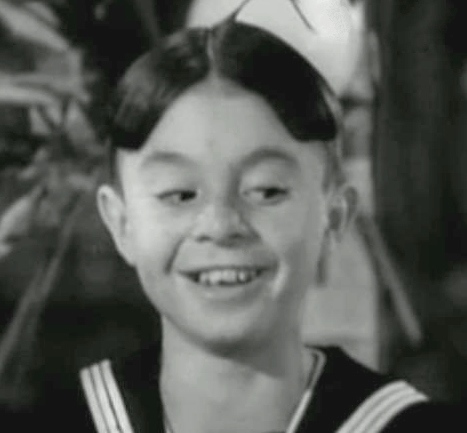
- Switzer in Our Gang Follies of 1938
- Born: Carl Dean Switzer; August 8, 1927; Paris, Illinois, U.S.
- Died: January 21, 1959 (aged 31); Mission Hills, Los Angeles, California, U.S.
- Cause of death: Homicide by gunshot wound
- Resting place: Hollywood Forever Cemetery, Los Angeles, California
- Other name: Alfalfa Switzer
- Occupations: Singer; child actor; dog breeder; guide
- Years active: 1935–1959
- Spouse: Dian Collingwood (m. 1954; div. 1957)
- Children: 1
- Relatives: Harold "Slim" Switzer (brother)

Carl Dean Switzer (August 8, 1927 – January 21, 1959) was an American child actor, comic singer, dog breeder, and guide. He was best known for his role as Alfalfa in the Our Gang series of short-subject comedies.

Switzer (rhyming with "Schweitzer", as pronounced in the Our Gang shorts Framing Youth and Alfalfa's Aunt) began his career as a child actor in 1935. He appeared in the Our Gang shorts as Alfalfa, one of the series' most popular and best-remembered characters. After outgrowing the series in 1940, Switzer struggled to find substantial roles, but was typecast as a juvenile actor. As an adult, he appeared mainly in bit parts and B-movies. He later became a dog breeder and hunting guide.

Switzer married heiress Diantha Collingwood in 1954 and they had one son. Switzer was shot and killed by Moses "Bud" Stiltz in 1959 due to a disagreement regarding a business arrangement.

== Early life ==
Carl Switzer was born in Paris, Illinois, on August 8, 1927, the youngest of four children born to Gladys Carrie Shanks (1904–1997) and George Frederick "Fred" Switzer (1905–1960). Gladys and Fred's first child, a boy, died in 1922, an hour and a half after being born. Carl's sister Janice Switzer was born in 1923 and his brother Harold Switzer was born in 1925. Harold and he became famous in their hometown for their musical talent and performances. Both sang and could play a number of instruments.

== Career ==
=== Our Gang ===
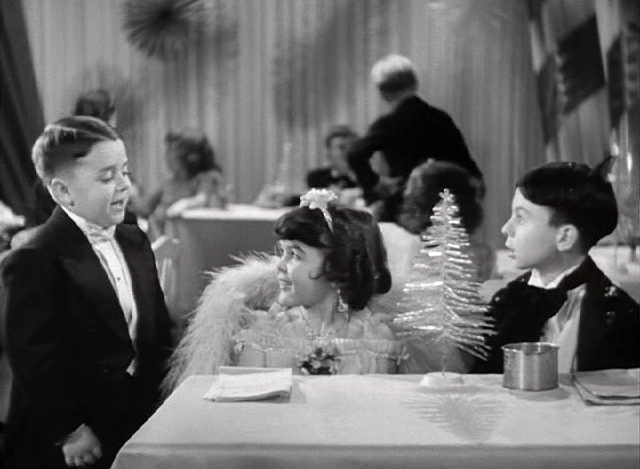
Switzer (right) as Alfalfa in Our Gang Follies of 1938, with fellow Our Gang cast members George "Spanky" McFarland and Darla Hood

In 1934, the Switzers traveled to California to visit family. While sightseeing, they went to Hal Roach Studios. Following a public tour, eight-year-old Harold and six-year-old Carl entered the Hal Roach Studio's open-to-the-public cafeteria, the Our Gang Café, and began an impromptu performance. Producer Hal Roach was present and was impressed. He signed both brothers to appear in Our Gang. Harold was given two nicknames, "Slim" and "Deadpan", while Carl was dubbed "Alfalfa".

The brothers first appeared in the 1935 Our Gang short Beginner's Luck. By the end of the year, Alfalfa was one of the main characters, with a distinctive cowlick hairstyle, while Harold had been relegated to the background. Although Carl was an experienced singer and musician, his character Alfalfa was often called upon to sing popular songs for comic effect, most often those of Bing Crosby and Pinky Tomlin. The comic effect was achieved by playing the musical accompaniment slightly beyond the young singer's range, so Switzer would struggle to reach the high notes -- resulting in squeaky, off-key tones.

By the end of 1937, Switzer's "Alfalfa" had surpassed the series' nominal star, George "Spanky" McFarland, in popularity. While the boys got along, their fathers argued constantly over their sons' screen time and salaries. Switzer's best friend among the Our Gang actors was Tommy Bond, who played his on-screen nemesis "Butch". In Bond's words, Switzer and he became good friends because "neither of us could replace the others".

=== Adult years ===
Switzer's tenure in Our Gang ended in 1940, when he was 12. His first role after leaving the series was as a boy scout in I Love You Again (1940) starring William Powell and Myrna Loy. He then co-starred in the 1941 comedy Reg'lar Fellers. The next year, he had a supporting role in Mrs. Wiggs of the Cabbage Patch. Switzer continued to appear in films in various supporting roles, including in Johnny Doughboy (1942), The Human Comedy (1943), Going My Way (1944), and The Great Mike (1944).

Switzer's last starring roles were in a brief series of imitation Bowery Boys films. He reprised his "Alfalfa" character, complete with comically sour vocals, in PRC's Gas House Kids comedies in 1946 and 1947. The Gas House Kids might have continued indefinitely, but the PRC studio was absorbed by the Eagle-Lion company in August 1947, ending the series. By this time, Switzer was downplaying his earlier Our Gang work. In his 1946 resumé, he referred to the films generically as "M-G-M short product".

Switzer had small parts in both the 1946 Christmas film It's a Wonderful Life, as Donna Reed's date at a high school dance, and again in the 1948 film On Our Merry Way, as the mayor's trumpet-playing son in a fixed musical talent contest. In 1952, he played a busboy in the film Pat and Mike starring Spencer Tracy and Katharine Hepburn. In the 1954 musical film White Christmas, only his photograph was used; he appeared in costume as "Freckle-Faced Haynes, the Dog-Faced Boy", an army buddy of Bing Crosby and Danny Kaye's).

In the 1950s, Switzer started acting on television. Between 1952 and 1955, he made six appearances on The Roy Rogers Show. He also guest-starred in an episode of the American science-fiction anthology series Science Fiction Theatre and The George Burns and Gracie Allen Show. In 1953 and 1954, Switzer co-starred in three William A. Wellman-directed films: Island in the Sky and The High and the Mighty, both starring John Wayne, and Track of the Cat, starring Robert Mitchum. Switzer himself was impressed by the Track of the Cat assignment, in which he played a white-haired Native American; it was the first time he had been called upon to play an adult character role. In 1955, he was featured (but not credited) in the Bowery Boys comedy Dig That Uranium, reuniting him with former Gas House Kids teammate Bennie Bartlett. Switzer had a bit part as a Hebrew whose son is born during the Exodus in Cecil B. DeMille's The Ten Commandments. Switzer's final film role was in the 1958 drama The Defiant Ones.

== Personal life ==
Offscreen, Switzer bred and trained hunting dogs and guided hunting expeditions. Among his notable clients were Roy Rogers and Dale Evans (godparents of Switzer's son), James Stewart, and Henry Fonda.

In early 1954, Switzer went on a blind date with Diantha Collingwood (1930–2004), also known as Dian or Diana. She was the daughter of Lelo and Faye Collingwood, and an heiress to the grain elevator empire Collingwood Grain. Collingwood had moved with her mother and sister to California in 1953 because her sister wanted to become an actress. Switzer and Collingwood got along well and married in Las Vegas three months later.

In 1956, with his money running out and Diantha pregnant, his mother-in-law offered them a farm near Pretty Prairie, Kansas. Their son, Justin Lance Collingwood Switzer (later Justin Lance Collingwood Eldridge) was born that year. They divorced in 1957. Diantha married Richard Rosswell "Ross" Eldridge (1933–2007), who adopted and raised Lance as his own, and had two other children by him, sons Chris and Lee Eldridge.

In 1987, former Our Gang co-star George "Spanky" McFarland recalled a meeting with Switzer when they spoke about the farm:

The last time I saw Carl was 1957. It was a tough time for me—and him. I was starting a tour of theme parks and county fairs in the Midwest. Carl had married this girl whose father owned a pretty good-sized farm near Wichita. When I came through town, he heard about it and called. He told me he was helping to run the farm, but he finally had to put a radio on the tractor while he was out there plowing. Knowing Carl, I knew that wasn't going to last. He may have come from Paris, Illinois, but he wasn't a farmer! We hadn't seen each other since we left the 'Gang.' So we had lunch. We talked about all the things you'd expect. And then I never saw him again. He looked pretty much the same. He was just Carl Switzer—kind of cocky, a little antsy—and I thought to myself he hadn't changed that much. He still talked big. He just grew up.

On January 26, 1958, Switzer was getting into his car in front of a bar in Studio City, when a bullet smashed through the window and struck him in the upper right arm. However, the gunman was never caught. Later that December, Switzer was arrested in Sequoia National Forest for cutting down 15 pine trees he had intended to sell illegally as Christmas trees. He was sentenced to one year's probation. Switzer was also ordered to pay a $225 fine (more than $2,500 today).

== Death ==
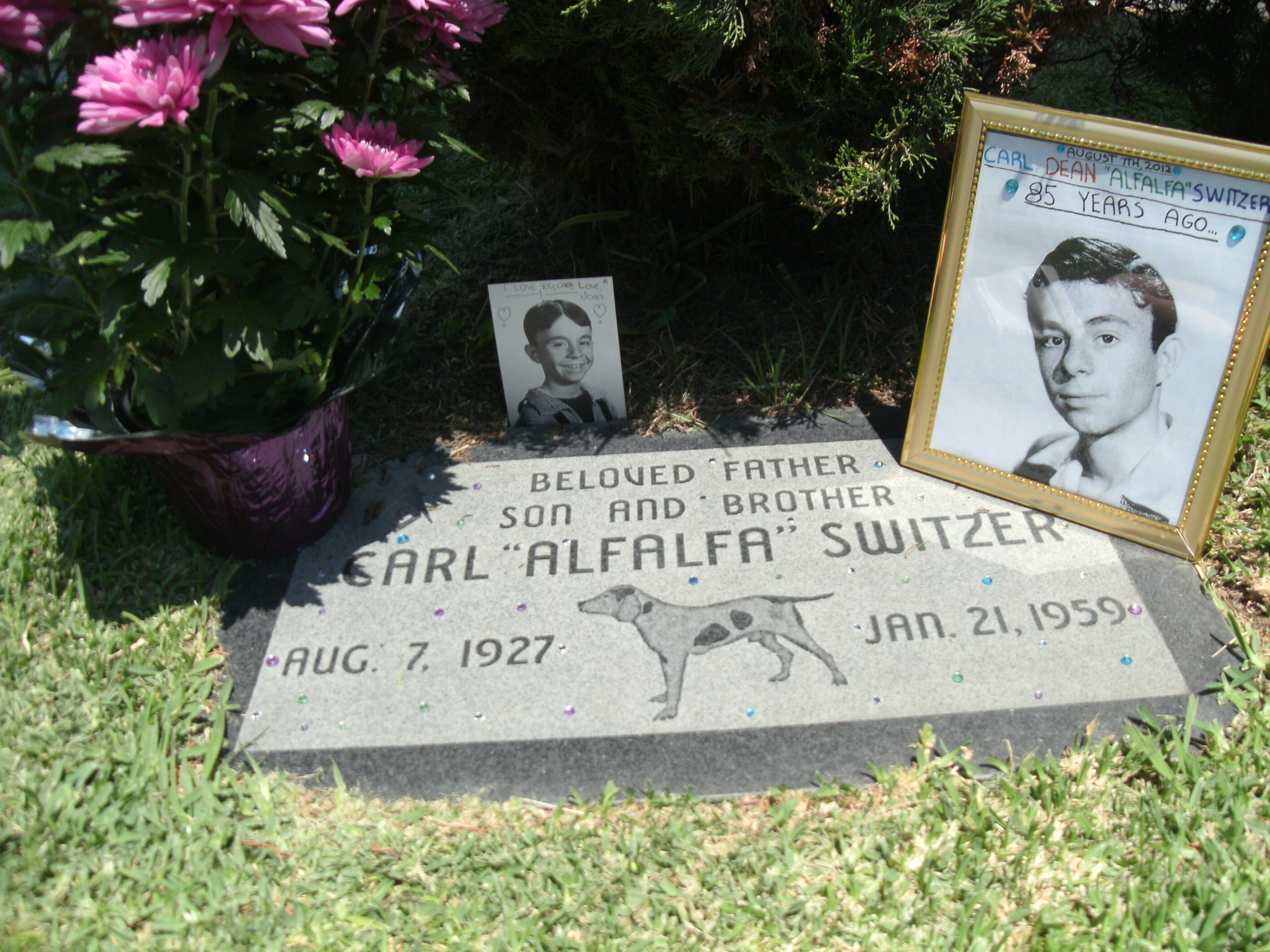
The grave of Carl Switzer at the Hollywood Forever Cemetery

Sometime in 1958, Switzer agreed to train a hunting dog, a Treeing Walker Coonhound, for Moses Samuel "Bud" Stiltz. Stiltz was Switzer's longtime friend and sometime business partner, whom Switzer had met while working with Roy Rogers on various productions at the Corriganville Movie Ranch. The dog, while in Switzer's possession, ran off to chase after a bear and disappeared. After learning that the dog had been lost while in Switzer's care, Stiltz demanded that Switzer had to either return his dog or pay him the equivalent of the dog's value.

Switzer was then working as a bartender. Unable to produce the money to settle the debt, Switzer took out ads in newspapers and put up fliers, offering a reward for the safe return of the animal. Eventually, the dog was located and brought to the bar where Switzer was working. Switzer rewarded the rescuer with $35.00 in cash and $15.00 in drinks (equivalent to $550 in 2025). Switzer was annoyed by the cash outlay; a few days later, in an emotional conversation with his friend Jack Piott, a 37-year-old unit still photographer, the two decided that Stiltz should reimburse Switzer the finder's fee. Their argument was that the dog was Stiltz's and not Switzer's.

The two arrived at Stiltz's home in Mission Hills, at 10400 Columbus Avenue. Stiltz shared the home with his wife, Rita Corrigan, and his stepchildren. Switzer and Piott intended to demand money from Stiltz. Though differing accounts of the event exist, all agree that Stiltz was struck over the left side of his head with a glass clock. He later retreated to his room to retrieve a .38-caliber revolver, and Switzer tried to wrestle the gun from him. Their struggle caused the gun to discharge and almost shot Tom Corrigan, Stiltz's 14-year-old stepson. Stiltz regained the weapon and shot Switzer.

Stiltz's account of the event was one of self-defense, testifying that Switzer had banged on his front door, yelling "Let me in, or I'll kick in the door." The threat was followed by a struggle that began with one of the men, Switzer or Piott, striking Stiltz with the clock. This prompted Stiltz to retrieve his firearm. According to Stiltz, Switzer threatened him with a knife and yelled, "I'm going to kill you!" Stiltz fired and shot Switzer in the groin, damaging an artery that caused massive internal bleeding. Switzer was pronounced dead on arrival at 7:27 pm at the hospital at the age of 31.

Tom Corrigan's account differed significantly from his stepfather's. He told investigators that Stiltz shot Switzer as Piott and he were leaving. After the gun's accidental discharge that almost hit Corrigan, Switzer turned to Piott and said they needed to leave. The two were headed for the door when Stiltz then fired the fatal shot. Switzer never drew a knife, as Stiltz had claimed he had.

Corrigan was never called to testify at the coroner's inquest, and Stiltz testified in his own favor. His testimony was taken to be truthful, despite physical evidence that contradicted his account and his past perjury conviction. Years later, Corrigan stood by what he told officers had happened that night, and said his stepfather did not have to kill Switzer.

=== Later accounts ===
The shooting was judged to be self-defense. The inquest regarding Switzer's death revealed that what was reported as a "hunting knife" was in fact a penknife. It had been found by crime-scene investigators under his body.

Over 42 years later, in January 2001, Tom Corrigan told reporters, "It was more like murder". He said he heard the knock on the front door, and Switzer said "Western Union for Bud Stiltz," and Corrigan's mother, Rita Corrigan, opened the door to find a drunk Switzer, complaining about a perceived month-old debt and demanding repayment. Corrigan said Switzer entered the house first, followed by Jack Piott. Switzer said he was going to beat up Stiltz, and Stiltz confronted Switzer with a .38-caliber revolver in his hand.

Corrigan said that Switzer grabbed the revolver and Stiltz and Switzer struggled over it. He said Piott broke a glass-domed clock over Stiltz's head, causing Stiltz's eye to swell shut. During the struggle, a shot was fired into the ceiling and Corrigan was struck in the leg by a fragment. Corrigan said his two younger sisters ran to a neighbor's house to call for help. "Well, we shot Tommy, enough of this," he said he recalled Switzer saying, just before Switzer and Piott started to leave the house.

Corrigan said he had just stepped out the front door when he heard, but did not witness, a second shot behind him. He said he then turned and saw Switzer sliding down the wall with a surprised look on his face after Stiltz had shot him. Corrigan said he saw a closed penknife at Switzer's side, which he presumed fell out of his pocket or his hand. He said he then saw his stepfather shove Piott against the kitchen counter and threaten to kill him, too. Corrigan said they heard emergency sirens as Piott begged for his life, and that he thought this was the only reason Stiltz did not kill Piott. Corrigan said his stepfather lied in his account of the event before the coroner's jury.

Corrigan said a Los Angeles Police Department detective interviewed him and asked if he would testify before the judge. Corrigan said he agreed to, but he was never called before the court.

Moses Stiltz died in 1983 at the age of 62.

=== Burial ===
Carl Switzer was interred at the Hollywood Forever Cemetery in Hollywood, California, on January 27, 1959. Because he died the same day as Cecil B. DeMille, his death received only minor notice in most newspapers, as DeMille's obituary dominated the columns. Switzer had appeared as a slave (uncredited) in one of the last films for which DeMille was credited as a director, The Ten Commandments.

Switzer's gravestone features the square and compasses of Freemasonry and an image of a hunting dog.

== Selected filmography ==
Film
Year	Title	Role	Notes
1930	Little Rascals: Best of Our Gang		
1935	Beginner's Luck	Tom	Short film
1935	Teacher's Beau	Alfalfa	Short film
1935	Sprucin' Up	Alfalfa	Short film
1935	Our Gang Follies of 1936	Alfalfa	Short film
1936	The Lucky Corner	Alfalfa	Short film
1936	Too Many Parents	Kid Singer	
1936	Arbor Day	Alfalfa	Short film
1936	Kelly the Second	Boy with stomach ache	Uncredited
1936	Spooky Hooky	Alfalfa	Short film
1936	Easy to Take	Alfred Bottle	
1937	Reunion in Rhythm	Alfalfa	Short film
1937	Rushin' Ballet	Alfalfa	Short film
1937	Pick a Star	Minor role	Uncredited
1937	Mail and Female	Alfalfa / Cousin Amiela	Short film
1937	Our Gang Follies of 1938	Alfalfa	Short film
1937	Wild and Woolly	Zero	
1938	Scandal Street	Bennie Nordskudder	
1938	Canned Fishing	Alfalfa	Short film
1938	Came the Brawn	Alfalfa	Short film
1938	Hide and Shriek	Alfalfa, alias X-10	Short film
1938	Football Romeo	Alfalfa	Short film
1939	The Ice Follies of 1939	Small Boy	Uncredited
1939	Duel Personalities	Alfalfa	Short film
1939	Clown Princes	The Great Alfalfa	Short film
1939	Captain Spanky's Show Boat	Alfalfa	Short film
1939	Time Out for Lessons	Alfalfa	Short film
1940	Alfalfa's Double	Alfalfa / Cornelius	Short film
1940	Good Bad Boys	Alfalfa	Short film
1940	Goin' Fishin'	Alfalfa	Short film
1940	I Love You Again	Leonard Harkspur Jr.	
1940	Kiddie Kure	Alfalfa	Short film
1940	Barnyard Follies	Alfalfa	Credited as "Alfalfa" Switzer
1941	Reg'lar Fellers	Bump Hudson	
1942	My Favorite Blonde	Frederick	Uncredited
1942	Henry and Dizzy	Billy Weeks	
1942	There's One Born Every Minute	Junior Twine	Credited as Alfalfa Switser
1942	The War Against Mrs. Hadley	Messenger	
1942	Mrs. Wiggs of the Cabbage Patch	Billy Wiggs	
1942	Johnny Doughboy	Alfalfa	
1943	The Human Comedy	Auggie	Uncredited
1943	Shantytown	Bindy	
1943	Dixie	Boy in street	Uncredited
1944	Rosie the Riveter	Buzz Prouty	
1944	Going My Way	Herman Langerhanke	Uncredited
1944	The Great Mike	Speck	
1944	Together Again	Elevator operator	Uncredited
1945	Man Alive	Ignatius	Uncredited
1945	She Wouldn't Say Yes	Delivery boy	Uncredited
1946	Courage of Lassie	First youth, a hunter	
1946	Gas House Kids	Sammy Levine	
1946	It's a Wonderful Life	Freddie Othello	Uncredited
1947	Gas House Kids Go West	Alfalfa	
1947	Gas House Kids in Hollywood	Alfalfa	
1947	Driftwood	Messenger	Uncredited
1948	On Our Merry Way	Leopold "Zoot" Wirtz	Alternative title: A Miracle Can Happen
1948	State of the Union	Bellboy	
1948	Big Town Scandal	Frankie Snead	Alternative title: Underworld Scandal
1949	A Letter to Three Wives	Leo, second messenger	Uncredited
1949	Alias the Champ	Newsboy	
1950	House by the River	Walter Herbert	Uncredited
1950	Redwood Forest Trail	Sidekick Alfie	
1951	Belle Le Grand	Messenger Boy	Uncredited
1951	Cause for Alarm!	Guy with Tex	Uncredited
1951	Two Dollar Bettor	Chuck Nordlinger	
1951	Here Comes the Groom	Messenger	Uncredited
1952	Pat and Mike	Busboy	
1952	I Dream of Jeanie	Freddie	Credited as Carl Dean Switzer
1952	The WAC from Walla Walla	Pvt. Cronkheit	Uncredited
1953	Island in the Sky	Sonny Hopper	
1953	Flight Nurse	Rifleman	Uncredited
1954	The High and the Mighty	Ensign Keim	
1954	This Is My Love	Customer	
1954	Track of the Cat	Joe Sam	
1954	White Christmas	Bennie Haynes (photograph only)	
1955	Not as a Stranger	Unexpected father	Uncredited
1955	Francis in the Navy	Timekeeper	Uncredited
1956	Dig That Uranium	Shifty Robertson	Uncredited
1956	The Ten Commandments	Slave	Uncredited
1956	Between Heaven and Hell	Savage	Uncredited
1957	Motorcycle Gang	Speed	
1958	The Defiant Ones	Angus	(final film role)

Television
Year	Title	Role	Notes
1952–1955	The Roy Rogers Show	Various roles	6 episodes
1954	The George Burns and Gracie Allen Show	Victor the Delivery Boy	Episode: "George Gets Call from Unknown Victor"
1955	Lux Video Theatre	Mailer	Episode: "Eight Iron Men"
1955	Science Fiction Theatre	Pete	Episode: "The Negative Man"

== Documentary ==
- "The Life and Death of Carl 'Alfalfa' Switzer", Grave Explorations, via YouTube, July 2, 2020.
