= Jack Chertok =

Television and film producer (1906–1995)

- Born: July 13, 1906; Atlanta, Georgia
- Died: June 14, 1995 (aged 88); Los Angeles, California
- Occupations: Television and film producer
- Years active: 1935–1966

Jack Chertok (July 13, 1906 – June 14, 1995) was an American film and television producer perhaps best known to modern viewers as producer for the 182 black-and-white episodes of The Lone Ranger.

== Career ==
Born in Atlanta, Georgia, to Russian-Jewish immigrants Annie Rouglin Chertok and Isadore Chertok, Chertok began his career in the mid-1930s, when he began producing a wide variety of film shorts for Metro-Goldwyn-Mayer (MGM), including comedies, documentaries, and crime dramas. His comedy short How to Sleep, starring Robert Benchley, won the 1935 Academy Award for Best Short Subject, Comedy. He was the producer for many short films in MGM's Crime Does Not Pay series and produced many of the Our Gang shorts after MGM took over that series from Hal Roach.

In 1949, Chertok made the move to television, producing 182 episodes for The Lone Ranger television series. He is also credited as a producer for other series such as Sky King, Steve Donovan, Western Marshal, Cavalcade of America for DuPont, and The Lawless Years. He was executive producer for the television series Private Secretary (1953–57), Steve Donovan, Western Marshal (1955–56), Johnny Midnight (1960), My Favorite Martian (1963–66), and My Living Doll (1964–65).

During the early 1960s, Chertok ran a summer camp in Barton Flats, California, named Camp Purple Sage, which featured horseback riding, arts and crafts, ping-pong, etc.

== Death ==
On June 14, 1995, Chertok died at the age of 88 in Los Angeles, California.

== Awards ==
Year	Award	Result	Category	Film
1936	Academy Award	Won	Best Short Subject, Comedy	How to Sleep
