= Eugene "Porky" Lee =

American child actor (1933–2005)

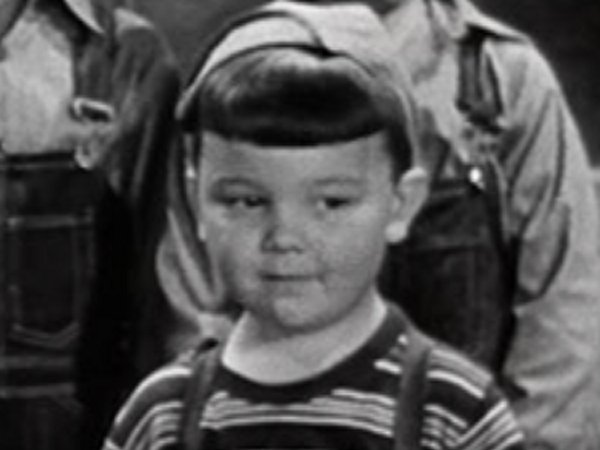
- Eugene "Porky" Lee in Our Gang Follies of 1938 (1937)
- Born: October 25, 1933; Fort Worth, Texas, U.S.
- Died: October 16, 2005 (aged 71); Minneapolis, Minnesota, U.S.
- Other name: Eugene Gordon Lee
- Occupation: Child actor
- Years active: 1935–1955
- Spouse: ? (?–1971)
- Partner: Janice McClain (1992–2005) (his death)
- Children: 1

Eugene Gordon Lee (October 25, 1933 – October 16, 2005) was an American child actor, most notable for appearing in the Our Gang (Little Rascals) comedies as Porky from 1935 to 1939. During his tenure in Our Gang, Porky originated the catchphrase "O-tay!", though it is commonly attributed to fellow character Buckwheat, played by Billie "Buckwheat" Thomas.

== Early life ==
Eugene Gordon Lee was born in Fort Worth, Texas on October 25, 1933 and he was adopted.

== Career ==
=== Our Gang ===
Lee began performing in motion pictures in 1935, after producer Hal Roach noted how much the eighteen-month-old toddler looked like Our Gang star George "Spanky" McFarland (who was also from Texas). The Lee family traveled from Texas to Culver City, California. Nicknamed "Porky" by the studio, Eugene Lee joined the cast as Spanky's little brother. Porky appeared in 42 Our Gang comedies over four years. Lee, McFarland, and Our Gang co-stars Carl "Alfalfa" Switzer, Billie "Buckwheat" Thomas, and Darla Hood constituted what is today the most familiar incarnation of Our Gang.

This group moved from Hal Roach Studios to Metro-Goldwyn-Mayer in 1938 after Roach sold the series. When Lee grew several inches in height during early 1939 (to the point that the five-year-old was the same height as ten-year-old McFarland), MGM replaced him with Mickey Gubitosi, later better known by the stage name Robert Blake.

=== Educator ===
After leaving the series, Lee retired from motion pictures, and entered public school. As an adult, he became an alternative school educator at Broomfield High School in Colorado. Lee changed his name to Gordon Lee (naming himself after his favorite Our Gang director, Gordon Douglas) to avoid any connection with his former acting career.

=== Embracing his acting career ===
In the early 1980s, Lee began appearing at Little Rascals reunions and began a business selling "Porky"-related merchandise. Finally embracing his past, Lee was known to tell Our Gang fans "we are relics of history."

== Personal life and death ==
After retiring from education, Lee moved to Minnesota's Twin Cities to be closer to his son, Douglas.

Janice McClain was his partner for his final 13 years.

On October 16, 2005, after battling lung cancer and brain cancer, he died in a Minneapolis nursing home at the age of 71, nine days before his 72nd birthday.

== See also ==
- List of notable brain tumor patients
