= Tommy Bond =

American actor (1926–2005)

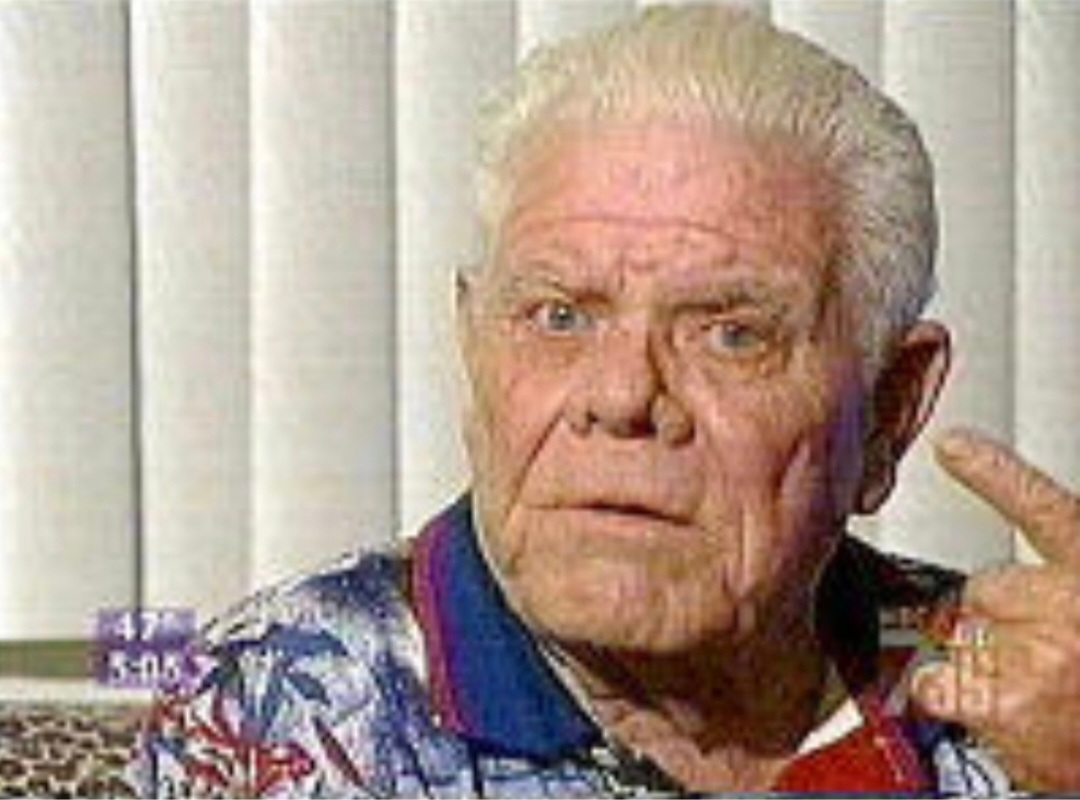
- Bond in 2001
- Born: Thomas Ross Bond; September 16, 1926; Dallas, Texas, U.S.
- Died: September 24, 2005 (aged 79); Northridge, California, U.S.
- Resting place: Riverside National Cemetery, Riverside, California
- Other name: Butch
- Occupations: Actor; director; producer; writer
- Years active: 1932–2005

Thomas Ross Bond (September 16, 1926 – September 24, 2005) was an American actor, director, producer and writer. He was best known for his work as a child actor for two nonconsecutive periods in Our Gang (Little Rascals) comedies (first as "Tommy" and later as "Butch"). He is also noted for being the first actor to appear onscreen as DC Comics character Jimmy Olsen in the film serials Superman (1948) and Atom Man vs. Superman (1950).

== Biography ==
=== Early years and Our Gang ===
Born in Dallas, Texas, Bond got his start in 1931 at the age of 5 when a talent scout for Hal Roach studios approached him as he was walking down a Dallas street with his mother.

Bond was hired at Hal Roach Studios for the Our Gang series in the summer of 1931 to begin work that upcoming fall, at around the same time as George "Spanky" McFarland was hired. Bond worked in Our Gang for three years, alternately appearing as a supporting character and a background actor. His speaking roles increased by 1934, including his most substantive role up to that point, as the gang's band conductor in Mike Fright. In late 1934, Bond left the series and returned to public school, still earning periodic bit parts in Hollywood productions.

After leaving the gang for the first time, Bond also worked as a voice actor, most notably in several of Tex Avery's Merrie Melodies cartoons for Warner Bros. His best known voice role was as the speaking voice of "Owl Jolson" in Tex Avery's 1936 Merrie Melodies cartoon, I Love to Singa.

Bond returned to Our Gang on a recurring basis late in 1936, when Roach hired him to play "Butch", the neighborhood bully. In the film Practical Jokers, his mother calls him "Tommy", apparently indicating that "Butch" was a nickname. Bond's first short as Butch was Glove Taps. Besides filling the role of the archetypal Our Gang bully, the Butch character also regularly competed with meek Alfalfa (Carl Switzer) for the affections of his sweetheart Darla (Darla Hood). While in Our Gang, Bond appeared in a number of outside films, such as those featuring fellow Hal Roach Studios comedians Charley Chase and Laurel and Hardy.

By the late 1930s Bond was so established as a juvenile actor that other studios recruited him for feature films. He was a regular in Columbia's Five Little Peppers series of children's stories in 1939-40. He also appeared opposite singing star Gloria Jean in Universal's A Little Bit of Heaven (1940).

When the Our Gang series moved to Metro-Goldwyn-Mayer in 1938, Bond remained with the group. His final Our Gang short was Bubbling Troubles (1940). Bond continued to work in other MGM productions following his departure from Our Gang. In total, Bond appeared in 27 Our Gang shorts – 13 as "Tommy" and 15 as "Butch".

=== Later years ===
After serving in the U.S. Navy during World War II, Bond returned to acting, and appeared in two Gas House Kids features alongside former on-screen rival Carl Switzer. In the late 1940s, Bond became the first actor to portray cub reporter Jimmy Olsen in two Superman film serials: Superman (1948) and Atom Man vs. Superman (1950).

In 1951, Bond graduated from college and quit acting, but remained in show business in the areas of television directing and production, and worked with individuals such as Norman Lear, George Schlatter, and many others. He worked at KTTV in Los Angeles from the 1950s to the early 1970s. He then went to work for KFSN in Fresno from the early 1970s to 1991. Bond also worked as a production manager on Rowan & Martin's Laugh-In.

During the 1960s, Bond was an active member of Emmanuel Lutheran Church in North Hollywood where a number of his Hollywood friends and colleagues attended. Together, they were instrumental in the production and presentation of the annual Christmas Pageant presented on the grounds of Emmanuel's school Laurel Hall. The production, which involved a cast of several hundred, a chariot and horses, numerous other animals and professional Hollywood sets and lighting, was presented each year during the Christmas season for several weeks leading up to Christmas. Grandstand-style bleachers were installed that seated about 1000 guests. Highlights of the pageant included a horse-driven chariot and Roman soldiers on horseback riding through the gates of Bethlehem to proclaim the census requiring Jews to register in their hometowns. Bond was instrumental in arranging for the production to be filmed and aired on Metromedia-owned Channel 11, KTTV in about 1965.

In 1972, he appeared as a guest on I've Got a Secret while working as a production assistant on the show. Bond retired from television in 1991. In his latter years he lived in the Fresno and Madera Ranchos area, and served as a spokesman for a number of Our Gang-related materials. Bond published his autobiography, Darn Right It's Butch: Memories of Our Gang/The Little Rascals, with the help of Fresno teacher, film historian and co-author Ron Genini, in 1994. Tommy's son, Thomas R. Bond II "Butch, Jr.", who is a film and television producer, worked with his father in their family production company, Biograph Company. The senior Bond also hosted The Rascals, a documentary on the life and times of the Little Rascals.

Throughout his lifetime, Bond appeared in 73 films, was a charter member of the Screen Actors Guild, joining in 1937, and worked with many Hollywood stars in the years of 1933 to 1951, including James Stewart, Eleanor Powell, Ray Bolger, Frank Morgan, and Eddie Cantor among many others.

== Death ==
Bond died on September 24, 2005, at age 79 due to complications from heart disease in Northridge, California. He was survived by his wife, son, and grandson. He is buried at U.S. Veterans Riverside National Cemetery in Riverside, California.

== Filmography ==
Year	Title	Role	Notes
1934	Kid Millions	Little Boy In Ice Cream Number	Uncredited
1935	The Marriage Bargain	Jimmy Sparks	
1935	The Calling of Dan Matthews	Tommy	Uncredited
1936	Next Time We Love	Pesky Kid	Uncredited
1936	The Return of Jimmy Valentine	Listener	Uncredited
1936	I Love to Singa	Owl Jolson	Uncredited
1936	Silly Billies	Student	Uncredited
1936	Counterfeit	Dicky	Uncredited
1936	Libeled Lady	Waif	Uncredited
1937	Champagne Waltz	Otto, Singing Student	Uncredited
1937	Married Before Breakfast	Baglipp's Kid	Uncredited
1937	Hideaway	Oscar Peterson	
1937	Rosalie	Mickey the Mascot	Uncredited
1938	City Streets	Tommy Francis Devlin	
1938	Block-Heads	Neighbor's Son	Uncredited
1939	Five Little Peppers and How They Grew	Joey Pepper	
1940	Five Little Peppers at Home	Joey Pepper	
1940	Out West with the Peppers	Joey Pepper	
1940	Five Little Peppers in Trouble	Joey Pepper	
1940	A Little Bit of Heaven	Jerry	
1941	Adventure in Washington	"Peewee" Haynes	
1941	New York Town	Willie	Uncredited
1943	This Land Is Mine	Pug-Nosed School Bully	Uncredited
1944	Man from Frisco	Russ Kennedy	
1945	Twice Blessed	Horace	
1945	The Beautiful Cheat	Jimmy	
1947	Gas House Kids Go West	Chimp	
1947	Gas House Kids in Hollywood	Chimp	
1948	Big Town Scandal	Waldo "Dum Dum" Riggs	
1948	Superman	Jimmy Olsen	Serial
1949	The Lucky Stiff	Newsboy	Uncredited
1949	Any Number Can Play	Mike	Uncredited
1949	Intruder in the Dust	Minor Role	Uncredited
1949	Tokyo Joe	Fingerprint Sergeant	Uncredited
1949	Battleground	Runner	Uncredited
1950	Atom Man vs. Superman	Jimmy Olsen	Serial
1950	Hot Rod	Jack Blodgett	
1951	Call Me Mister	Little Soldier	Uncredited
1951	Bedtime for Bonzo	Student Reading Newspaper	Uncredited
1971	The Love Machine	Stagehand	Uncredited
1972	I've Got a Secret	Himself	
2004	Bob's Night Out	Crazy Neighbor	(final film role)

== Books ==
- Bond, Tommy, w. Genini, Ron (1994). Darn Right It's Butch: Memories of Our Gang/The Little Rascals. Delaware: Morgan Press. ISBN 0-9630976-5-2.
