= Darla Hood =

American child actress (1931–1979)

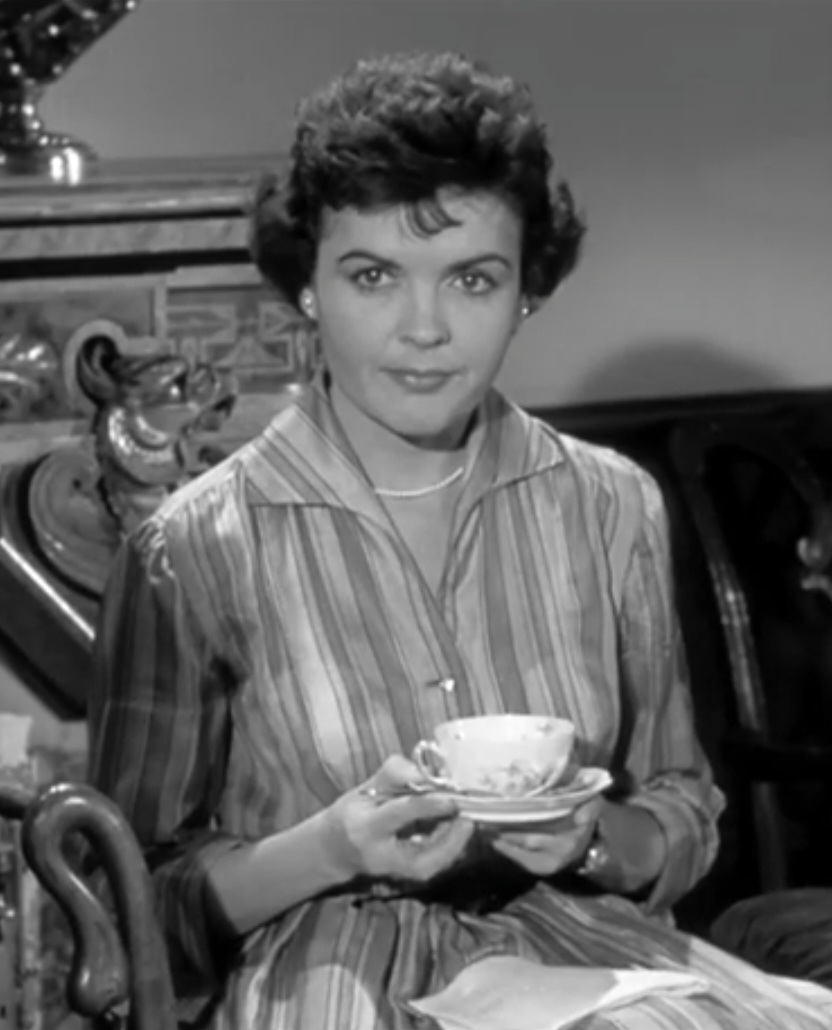
- Hood in The Bat (1959)
- Born: Darla Jean Hood; November 8, 1931; Leedey, Oklahoma, U.S.
- Died: June 13, 1979 (aged 47); North Hollywood, California, U.S.
- Resting place: Hollywood Forever Cemetery
- Other name: Cookie
- Occupation: Child actress
- Years active: 1935–1979
- Spouses: Robert W. Decker (m. 1949; div. 1957) Jose Granson (m. 1957)
- Children: 3

Darla Jean Hood (November 8, 1931 – June 13, 1979) was an American child actress, best known as the female lead in the Our Gang series from 1935 to 1941. As an adult, she performed as a singer in nightclubs and on television.

== Our Gang ==
Hood was born in Leedey, Oklahoma, the only child of music teacher Elizabeth Davner, and James Claude Hood, who worked in a bank. Her mother introduced her to singing and dancing at an early age, taking her to lessons in Oklahoma City. Just after her third birthday she was taken to New York City, where she was seen by Joe Rivkin, a casting director for Hal Roach Studios, who arranged a screen test. She was hired and went to Culver City, California, to appear in the Our Gang series.

Hood used her real name in the series except for her debut, in which her character's name was "Cookie". She made her debut at age four in the 1935 film Our Gang Follies of 1936 and was soon given a role in The Bohemian Girl with Laurel and Hardy. From 1935 through 1941, she continued to play in Our Gang. She is well remembered for her coquettish character, typically the love interest of Alfalfa, Butch, or (occasionally) Waldo. One of her most memorable moments was singing "I'm in the Mood for Love" in The Pinch Singer.

Hood's final Our Gang appearance was at age 10 in 1941's Wedding Worries.

== After Our Gang ==
When she outgrew her role in Our Gang, Hood appeared in several other movies and attended school in Los Angeles. While at Fairfax High School, she organized a vocal group called the Enchanters with four boys. Shortly after graduation, the quintet was booked by producer and vaudeville star Ken Murray for his famous "Blackouts", a stage variety show. The group remained with Murray's Blackouts during its long run in New York City and Hollywood.

Hood went solo with singing engagements in nightclubs and guest appearances on television. The deep, rich voice she developed as an adult was a striking contrast to the child singing most of the public remembered. She was a regular on The Ken Murray Show from 1950 to 1951. In 1955, she was a leading lady in the act of ventriloquist Edgar Bergen. In 1957, Hood was a regular performer on The Merv Griffin Show on ABC. Other credits that year include a hit record, "I Just Wanna Be Free." and a duet with Johnny Desmond in the Sam Katzman movie Calypso Heat Wave. Between 1959 and 1962, she recorded several singles for the small Ray Note and Acama labels.

In January 1959, Hood released a new record, "My Quiet Village" (Ray Note Records). Joe Rivkin, who discovered her as a child, saw the cover and cast her in her final film role—her first adult role in a movie—playing a secretary in the suspense drama The Bat with Vincent Price and Agnes Moorehead. In 2018, along with Hood's recording of "Silent Island," "My Quiet Village" was re-released by The Numero Group both on the Exotica compilation Technicolor Paradise: Rhum Rhapsodies & Other Exotic Delights and on Silent Island, a digital-download-only retrospective of Hood's vocal music.

Hood was a guest on such TV shows of the early 1960s as You Bet Your Life and The Jack Benny Program, where she appeared on October 30, 1962, as "Darla" in a spoof of the Our Gang comedies with Jack Benny (who appeared as Alfalfa), and The Charlotte Peters Show in St. Louis. She did singing and voice-over on TV commercials, which included Campbell's Soup and Chicken of the Sea tuna. She was also featured in The Little Rascals Christmas Special (1979) as the voice of Spanky and Porky's mother. She appeared in her own nightclub act at the Coconut Grove in Los Angeles, the Copacabana in New York, and the Sahara Hotel and Casino in Las Vegas, Nevada.

== Personal life ==
Hood was married twice, first to singer and insurance salesman Robert W. Decker (1949–1957), then to record-company executive Jose Granson (1957–1979). She and Granson had three children. Tommy "Butch" Bond mentioned that her marriage to Granson was difficult because he used a wheelchair following a stroke.

== Death ==
Hood was busy organizing the 1980 Little Rascals reunion for the Los Angeles chapter of The Sons of the Desert when she underwent an appendectomy at Canoga Park Hospital, Canoga Park, California. After the procedure, she died unexpectedly of heart failure on June 13, 1979, at age 47. An autopsy disclosed that Hood had contracted hepatitis from a contaminated blood transfusion given during the operation which led to her death.

Hood's funeral was held on June 18 at Pierce Brothers Mortuary chapel and attended by approximately 150 relatives and friends, including former Our Gang cast members Micki "Happy" Laughlin and Matthew "Stymie" Beard as well as Lucille Prin (wife of Hal Roach). Dr. Kenneth Watson of Hollywood United Methodist Church delivered the eulogy, sharing personal messages from Hood's mother, Elizabeth Liberatore, and her daughter, Darla Jo Granson. Hood's husband, Jose Granson; her stepfather; daughter; and stepdaughter Robin were present, though her son Brett was unable to attend. Hood's mother was unable to attend due to the emotional difficulty of the occasion.

Upon learning of Hood's death, fellow Our Gang member Billie "Buckwheat" Thomas said "I hate to hear it. It's a shock. She was an awfully nice person, a fine woman. We got along real good as kids." Thomas died a little over a year later.

== Filmography ==
Year	Title	Role	Notes
1936	The Bohemian Girl	Arline as a Child	
1936	Neighborhood House	Mary Chase	
1939	The Ice Follies of 1939	Sister	Uncredited
1942	Born to Sing	'Quiz Kid'	
1943	Happy Land	Lenore Prentiss - Age 12	Uncredited
1957	Calypso Heat Wave	Johnny's Duet Partner	
1957	The Helen Morgan Story	Girl Singer at Piano	Uncredited
1959	The Bat	Judy Hollander	
1965	Gulliver's Travels Beyond the Moon	Princess	(English version), Voice
