= Spanky McFarland =

American child actor (1928–1993)

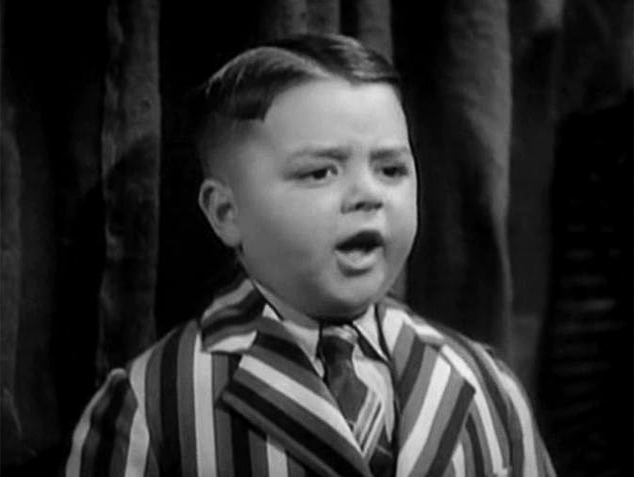
- McFarland as "Spanky" in Our Gang Follies of 1938
- Born: George Robert Phillips McFarland; October 2, 1928; Dallas, Texas, U.S.
- Died: June 30, 1993 (aged 64); Grapevine, Texas, U.S.
- Occupation: Child actor
- Years active: 1931–1944
- Spouse: Doris McFarland (m. 1967)
- Children: 3

George Robert Phillips McFarland (October 2, 1928 – June 30, 1993) was an American actor most famous for starring as a child as Spanky in Hal Roach's Our Gang series of short-subject comedies of the 1930s and 1940s. The Our Gang shorts were later syndicated to television as The Little Rascals.

In addition to his work in Our Gang and its feature-film spin-off General Spanky (1936), McFarland regularly appeared in co-starring or supporting juvenile roles in feature films produced by other studios throughout the 1930s. These included Kentucky Kernels (1934) with Bert Wheeler and Robert Woolsey, The Trail of the Lonesome Pine (1936) with Sylvia Sidney and Fred MacMurray, and Peck's Bad Boy with the Circus (1938). Leaving acting as a teenager, McFarland had several varying careers as an adult before finding success as a sales executive. He spent the final decades of his life as a public speaker reflecting on his child-acting career.

== Early life ==
McFarland was born in Dallas, Texas, on October 2, 1928, to Virginia Winifred (née Phillips) and Robert Emmett McFarland. He had three siblings: Thomas ("Tommy", who appeared in a few Our Gang episodes as "Dynamite"), Amanda, and Roderick ("Rod"). He attended Lancaster High School in Lancaster, Texas.

Before joining the Our Gang comedies, "Sonny", as he was called by his family, modeled children's clothing for a Dallas department store and was also seen around the Dallas area on highway billboards and in print advertisements for Wonder Bread. This established Sonny early on in the local public's eye as an adorable child model and provided experience before cameras.

== Career ==
=== Our Gang ===
In January 1931, in response to a trade magazine advertisement from Hal Roach Studios in Culver City, California, requesting photographs of "cute kids", Spanky's Aunt Dottie (Virginia's sister) sent pictures from Sonny's portfolio. An invitation for a screen test arrived that spring, leading to his acting career. Portions of Spanky's screen test are included in a 1932 Our Gang entry, Spanky.

The nickname "Spanky" is erroneously said to have arisen from warnings by his mother not to misbehave during one of the initial discussions with Hal Roach in his office. McFarland contradicted the tale, saying that the name was given by a Los Angeles newspaper reporter. Use of the "Spanky" name by McFarland for subsequent business or personal activities was expressly granted to McFarland in one of his studio contracts. In later years some family members would affectionately refer to him as "Spank".

Upon being discovered at age three, he instantly became a key member of the Our Gang children's comedy movie series and one of Hollywood's stars. His earliest films show him as an outspoken toddler, grumpily going along with the rest of the gang. His scene-stealing abilities brought him more attention, and by 1935 he was the de facto leader of the gang, often paired with Carl "Alfalfa" Switzer, and always the enterprising "idea man". Switzer's character became as much of a scene-stealer as the young McFarland was, and the two boys' fathers fought constantly over screen time and star billing for their children.

Spanky McFarland's only starring feature-film role was in the 1936 Hal Roach film General Spanky, an unsuccessful attempt to move the Our Gang series into features. He also appeared as a juvenile performer in many non-Roach feature films, including the Wheeler & Woolsey comedy Kentucky Kernels, the early Technicolor feature The Trail of the Lonesome Pine (1936), and two Fritz Lang features of the 1940s.

Following the 1938 Our Gang short Came the Brawn, McFarland "retired" from Our Gang, beginning a personal appearance tour. In mid-1938, Hal Roach sold the Our Gang unit to Metro-Goldwyn-Mayer, who began casting for a new "team leader" character in Spanky's vein and ended up rehiring McFarland himself. He remained in the MGM Our Gang productions until his final appearance in the series Unexpected Riches in 1942, at age fourteen.

=== Later years ===
In 1952, at age 24, McFarland joined the U.S. Air Force. Upon his return to civilian life, indelibly typecast in the public's mind as "Spanky" from Our Gang, he found himself unable to find work in show business. He took less glamorous jobs, including work at a soft drink plant, a hamburger stand, and a popsicle factory. In the mid-1950s, when the Our Gang comedies were syndicated on television as The Little Rascals, McFarland hosted an afternoon children's show, The Spanky Show, on KOTV television in Tulsa, Oklahoma. The show included a studio audience and appearances by other celebrities such as James Arness. Little Rascals shorts were also shown. Station executives prevented McFarland from developing and expanding the show's format, and by 1960 McFarland had quit the show.

After that stint, he continued at odd jobs: selling wine, operating a restaurant and night club, and selling appliances, electronics, and furniture. He was selling for Philco-Ford Corporation, where he advanced to national sales training director. During this time, McFarland continued to make personal appearances and cameo roles in films and television, including an appearance on The Mike Douglas Show with Darla Hood and William "Buckwheat" Thomas.

In 1985, as general manager, McFarland helped launch the classic movie channel The Nostalgia Channel. During the 1990s, after his self-described "semi-retirement", Spanky lent his name and celebrity to help raise money for charities, primarily by participating in golf tournaments. Spanky also had his own namesake charity golf classic for 16 years, held in Marion, Indiana. He also traveled the country doing speaking engagements and lectures about his movie roles and his days in the Our Gang. His final television appearance was in 1993, playing himself in the cold open of the Cheers episode "Woody Gets An Election".

In January 1994, McFarland posthumously joined fellow alumnus Jackie Cooper to become one of only two Our Gang members to receive a star on Hollywood's Walk of Fame.

== Death ==
McFarland died of "a heart attack or an aneurysm" at his home; his remains were cremated shortly thereafter. A cenotaph for McFarland to be placed at the Texas State Cemetery in Austin, Texas, has been approved, but according to the cemetery's website, has yet to be installed.

== Namesake ==
The 1960s sunshine pop rock group Spanky and Our Gang named themselves after McFarland's character because singer Elaine "Spanky" McFarlane's last name was similar to his. However, this is disputed by biographer Bruce Eder, who has said her fellow musician Arnie Lanza gave her the nickname "Spanky," based on what he saw as her resemblance to George McFarland who played "Spanky" in the Our Gang comedies.

In 1990, McFarland filed a $100,000 lawsuit against a bar owner in St. Paul, Minnesota. McFarland claimed that "Spanky's" bar on East 7th Street used his name and face for thirteen years without permission. The lawsuit also called for McFarland to receive all of the internal merchandise and equipment featuring his likeness. The case was eventually settled, and the owner changed the name to Checker's Bar.

== Filmography ==
McFarland appeared as "Spanky" in 95 Our Gang films between 1932 and 1942. He also appeared in:

- One Track Minds (1933, Short) as Spanky (uncredited)
- Day of Reckoning (1933) as Johnny Day
- Miss Fane's Baby Is Stolen (1934) as Johnny Prentiss
- The Cracked Iceman (1934, Short) as boy who says 'Just skip it'
- Kentucky Kernels (1934) as Spanky
- Here Comes the Band (1935) as Spanky Lowry
- O'Shaughnessy's Boy (1935) as Joseph "Stubby" O'Shaughnessy (as a child)
- The Trail of the Lonesome Pine (1936) as Buddie Tolliver
- General Spanky (1936) as Spanfield George 'Spanky' Leonard
- Varsity Show (1937) as Hap
- Peck's Bad Boy with the Circus (1938) as Pee Wee
- Johnny Doughboy (1942) as Spanky
- I Escaped from the Gestapo (1943) as Billy
- Seeing Hands (1943, Short) as the boy leading the initiation (uncredited)
- Cowboy and the Senorita (1944) as the kid who trips Teddy Bear (uncredited)
- The Woman in the Window (1944) as the boy scout who finds Mazard's body (uncredited)
- Spanky's Clubhouse (1950) as host
- The George Gobel Show (1955) as self
- The Aurora Encounter (1986) as the governor
- King B: A Life in the Movies (1993) as himself
- Cheers (1993, Episode: "Woody Gets an Election") as himself (final appearance)
