= Our Gang Follies of 1936 =

1935 short film by Gus Meins

- Title card
- Directed by: Gus Meins
- Produced by: Hal Roach
- Starring: George McFarland; Billie Thomas; Carl Switzer; Scotty Beckett; Darla Hood; Eugene Lee
- Cinematography: Art Lloyd
- Edited by: Bert Jordan
- Music by: Marvin Hatley; LeRoy Shield; Walter Donaldson; Sam M. Lewis; Joe Young; Harry McGregor Woods; Pinky Tomlin; Coy Poe; Jimmie Grier; Ethelbert Nevin
- Distributed by: MGM
- Release date: November 10, 1935
- Running time: 18 minutes
- Country: United States
- Language: English

Our Gang Follies of 1936 is a 1935 Our Gang short comedy film directed by Gus Meins. Produced by Hal Roach and released to theaters by Metro-Goldwyn-Mayer, it was the 140th Our Gang short to be released and the first of several musical entries in the series.

== Plot ==
The gang stages a big musical revue in Spanky's cellar ("6 Acts of Swell Actin," reads a sign above the cellar door). Spanky, as the master of ceremonies, persuades the neighborhood kids through song to come to the show, which includes performances by a miniature chorus line, a trio of farm girls, a group of kids dressed as skeletons, and featured spots for Alfalfa and a new girl named Cookie.

Backstage, there is pandemonium involving Buckwheat's dealings with a mischievous little monkey, as well as Spanky's worrying over his star act, the Flory-Dory Girls, whose tardiness forces the would-be impresario to keep shuffling his acts. When the show reaches its final act with still no sign of the Flory-Dories, Spanky has the other boys dress in the Flory-Dories' costumes. Since he knows the girls' dance, Spanky figures the gang can pull off the act in drag if everyone just does what he does. Unknown to Spanky, however, the monkey that was terrorizing Buckwheat has hidden in the bustle of Spanky's costume. The monkey pulls a needle from the costume during the dance and begins stabbing Spanky in the rear, and the other boys mimic his out-of-character jolts of pain and discomfort to the audience's amusement. Spanky manages to accidentally shake his dress to the floor, and the other boys follow suit, ruining the act as the audience roars with laughter.

Cookie tries to bring down the curtain, but only succeeds in trapping the boys in front of the curtain, causing them to scramble underneath as Spanky closes out the show (with the curtain hiding his corset, garters and lace leggings) and sends the audience of kids home.

== Notes ==
A follow-up to the popular radio/talent show based Our Gang entries Mike Fright and Beginner's Luck, Our Gang Follies of 1936 took the concept of those two films one step further by having the kids themselves stage an elaborate revue on their own. Follies of 1936 was a particular success with theater owners, leading to a long line of Our Gang mini-musicals, among them a direct sequel, Our Gang Follies of 1938, and several other all-revue shorts, including Reunion in Rhythm, Ye Olde Minstrels, and Melodies Old and New, among others.

The short marked the first appearance of Darla Hood, who was added to the Our Gang cast while Follies of 1936 was in production, necessitating last-minute rewrites to include her in the film. Her nickname of "Cookie" was dropped after this initial short due to the opinion of Darla being a good name. Darla would remain with Our Gang for six years, becoming its most famous leading lady and a featured part of many of the musical numbers in the short films.

Follies of 1936 is also the first Our Gang short to feature Carl "Alfalfa" Switzer rendering an off-key rendition of a popular pop ballad, in this case Pinky Tomlin's "The Object of My Affection". Alfalfa's parodies of pop songs quickly became standard features of the Our Gang shorts, and many future Our Gang comedies, including The Pinch Singer and Framing Youth, are built around the young singer's (in)ability to sell a song.

Scotty Beckett, whose role as Spanky's sidekick had been marginalized with Alfalfa's introduction into the series in early 1935, made his final appearance in Follies of 1936 before departing Our Gang for a successful career as a child actor in feature films. Another Our Gang short featuring Beckett, The Lucky Corner, would be released four months after Follies of 1936, although it was filmed in 1935.

At least eight Meglin Kiddies made appearances as either musical number performers or as extras.

== Cast ==
=== Main Our Gang cast ===
- Scotty Beckett as Scotty
- Darla Hood as Cookie
- Eugene Gordon Lee as Porky
- George McFarland as Spanky
- Carl Switzer as Alfalfa
- Billie Thomas as Buckwheat
- Dickie Jones as Dickie
- Dickie De Nuet as Little boy
- Sidney Kibrick as Our Gang member
- Donald Proffitt as Our Gang member
- Leona McDowell as Usherette
- Jackie White as Girl helped with dress
- George the Monk as Monkey

=== Featured musical performers ===
- The Brian Sisters: Doris, Betty and Gwen as Farm girls
- Junior Cavanaugh and Garrett Joplin as Tap dancers
- Patsy Northup, Georgia Bank, and Peggy Speth as Hula dancers
- Joy Wurgaft as Girl singing with Alfalfa
- The Meglin Kiddies as the 'Follys' Chorus

=== Featured audience members ===
- Rex Downing as Audience member with glasses
- Leonard Kibrick as Leonard
- Harold Switzer as Harold
- Jerry Tucker as Jerry
- Dix Davis as Boy lifted in air by fat kids
- Kay Frye as Scared girl in audience
- Philip Hurlic as Black boy in audience
- Marvin Strin as Fat kid in audience
- Billy Lee Wolfstone as Fat kid in audience

=== Dancers and audience extras ===
Jackie Banning, Therese Bonner, Daniel Boone, Frances Bowling, Patty Brown, Moyer "Sonny" Bupp, Janet Comerford, Barbara Goodrich, Joan Gray, Paul Hilton, Phyllis Holt, Joyce Kay, Patty Kelly, Mildred Kornman, Yvonee Lohn, Priscilla Lyon, Billy Minderhout, June Preston, Phillip Marley Rock, Jimmy Somerville, Delmar Watson, Jackie White

== Musical numbers ==
Songwriters are noted in italics.

1. "Step Up, Kids!/Tap Dance/She'll Be Coming 'Round the Mountain/Honolulu Baby" (Marvin Hatley, Gus Meins) - Spanky, Alfalfa, Jerry, Junior Cavanaugh, Garrett Joplin, Patsy Northrup, Georgia Bank, Peggy Speth
2. "Hello, Hello, Hello/Good Morning Children" (Hatley) - Chorus Girls
3. "How Ya Gonna Keep 'Em Down On The Farm (After They've Seen Paree)" (Walter Donaldson, Sam M. Lewis, Joe Young) - The Brian Sisters
4. "I'll Never Say 'Never Again' Again" (Harry McGregor Woods) - Cookie
5. "The Ghost Frolic" (Hatley) - Kids in skeleton costumes
6. "The Object Of My Affection" (Pinky Tomlin, Coy Poe, Jimmie Grier) - Alfalfa, Joy Wurgaft, Cookie
7. "Narcissus" (Ethelbert Nevin) - The "Flory-Dory Sixtette": Spanky, Alfalfa, Buckwheat, Scotty, Dickie Jones, and Sidney

== See also ==
- Our Gang filmography
- Florodora
