= Paula Stevens =

Paula Stevens may refer to:

- Paula Stevens, character in Allez Oop
- Paula Stevens, see List of Sunset Beach characters
