= Dog Daze =

Dog Daze may refer to:

- Dog Daze (1939 film), an Our Gang short comedy film
- Dog Daze (1937 film), a Merrie Melodies cartoon
