= For Pete's Sake =

For Pete's Sake may refer to:

- For Pete's Sake!, a 1934 Our Gang short
- For Pete's Sake (film), a 1974 American screwball comedy
- "For Pete's Sake" (Luke Cage), a 2018 television episode
- "For Pete's Sake", a song by Pete Rock & CL Smooth from Mecca and the Soul Brother, 1992
- "For Pete's Sake", a song by the Monkees from Headquarters, 1967
