= Arbor Day (film) =

1936 film

- Directed by: Fred C. Newmeyer
- Produced by: Hal Roach
- Starring: George McFarland; Carl Switzer; George Branso; Olive Branso; George Guhl; Maurice Cass; Darla Hood; Billie Thomas; Rosina Lawrence; Hattie McDaniel
- Cinematography: Milton R. Krasner
- Edited by: Bert Jordan
- Music by: Marvin Hatley
- Distributed by: MGM
- Release date: May 2, 1936
- Running time: 17' 14"
- Country: United States
- Language: English

Arbor Day is a 1936 Our Gang short comedy film directed by Fred C. Newmeyer. It was the 145th Our Gang short to be released.

== Plot ==
Spanky attempts to hide from the truant officer and avoid going to school, where he is being forced to participate in the Green Street Grammar School's annual Arbor Day show. Alfalfa tries to talk him out of his fears, but truant officer Smithers happens along to personally usher both children to school himself.

Meanwhile, a husband and wife dwarf pair (George and Olive Brasno) walk out on their circus sideshow jobs. They disguise themselves as children to enjoy a day about town, but Smithers mistakes them for actual children and takes them to school. At school, the kids trudge through their Arbor Day recitals and songs (Alfalfa contributes a squeaky rendition of Joyce Kilmer's "Trees" set to music by Oscar Rasbach.) When the dwarfs-in-disguise offer to join in the show, they contribute a shimmy routine which shocks the entire audience of faculty and parents. The circus proprietor turns up to apprehend the two dwarfs, who, as they are carried away back to the circus, call out to the recital audience "Come over and see a good show sometime!" Principal Cass then informs Smithers he's fired, to Spanky and Alfala's delight.

== Cast ==
=== The Gang ===
- Darla Hood as Darla
- George McFarland as Spanky
- Carl Switzer as Alfalfa
- Billie Thomas as Buckwheat

=== Additional cast ===
- Daniel Boone - Brown-haired boy in pageant
- Gloria Brown as Ballet dancer
- Betsy Gay as Ballet dancer
- George Brasno as Man Midget
- Olive Brasno as Woman Midget
- Maurice Cass as Mr. Cass
- George Guhl as Truant Officer Smithers
- Rosina Lawrence as Miss Lawrence
- Hattie McDaniel as Buckwheat's mother
- Dick Rush as Murphy, the side show barker
- Kathryn Sheldon as Miss Argyle
- May Wallace as Autograph Seeker
- John Collum as Classroom extra
- Jack Egger as Classroom extra
- Bobby Dunn as Crowd Extra
- Rolfe Sedan as Crowd Extra

== Notes ==
- Arbor Day marks a return Our Gang appearance for George and Olive Brasno, a brother-sister midget team who appeared in Shrimps for a Day a year prior. George Guhl portrays their nemesis truant officer. The film also features future Academy Award winner Hattie McDaniel as the mother of Billie "Buckwheat" Thomas, and Rosina Lawrence in her first appearance as the Gang's schoolteacher Miss Lawrence. Arbor Day was the last regular two-reel Our Gang comedy. All further releases in the series—save for the special release Our Gang Follies of 1938—would be one reel (approximately ten minutes) in length.
- While not edited substantially for inclusion in the Little Rascals television syndication package from the 1950s to the 1990s, Arbor Day was moderately edited for time constraints when broadcast as part of the American Movie Classics network's Little Rascals package from 2001 to 2003.

== See also ==
- Our Gang filmography
