= Scotty Beckett =

American actor (1929–1968)

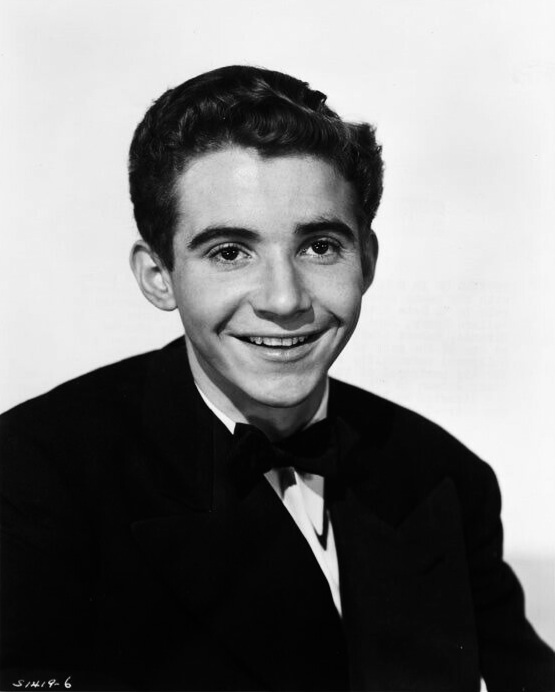
- Beckett in 1948
- Born: Scott Hastings Beckett; October 4, 1929; Oakland, California, U.S.
- Died: May 10, 1968 (aged 38); Los Angeles, California, U.S.
- Resting place: San Fernando Mission Cemetery
- Education: University of Southern California (dropped out)
- Occupation: Actor
- Years active: 1933–1957
- Spouses: Beverly Baker (m. 1949; div. 1950) Sunny Vickers (m. 1951; div. 1957) Margaret Sabo (m. 1961)
- Children: 1

Scott Hastings Beckett (October 4, 1929 – May 10, 1968) was an American actor. He began his career as a child actor in the Our Gang shorts and later costarred on Rocky Jones, Space Ranger.

== Early life and career ==
Born in Oakland, California, Beckett got his start in show business at age three when the family moved to Los Angeles. A casting director heard him singing by chance at Cedars of Lebanon Hospital where his father was recovering from an illness. The director told his parents Beckett had movie potential. He auditioned, and landed a part in Gallant Lady (1933), alongside Dickie Moore. The same year, his father died. In 1934, he joined Our Gang, in which Moore had appeared from 1932 to 1933.

=== Our Gang ===
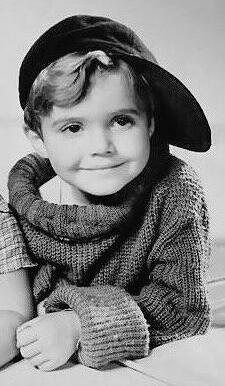
Beckett in a publicity photo in 1934.

Beckett appeared as a regular in the Our Gang short subjects series from 1934 to 1935. In it, he played George "Spanky" McFarland's best friend and partner in mischief. His trademark look was a crooked baseball cap and an oversized sweater exposing one shoulder. His role was taken over by Carl "Alfalfa" Switzer in 1935, and he left the series for features in 1936. In 1939, he returned briefly as Alfalfa's cousin, Wilbur, in Cousin Wilbur and Dog Daze.

== Career after Our Gang ==
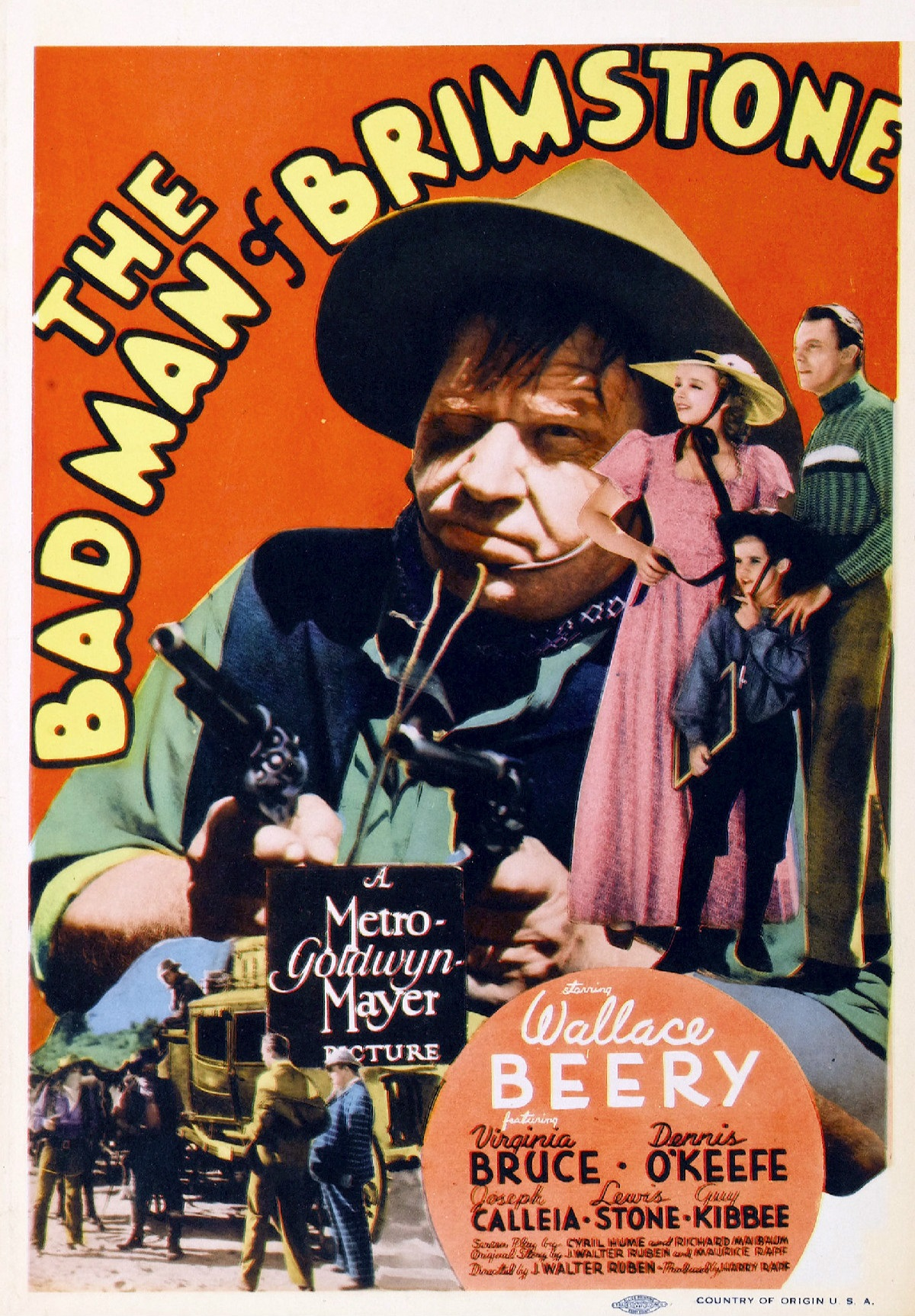
Beckett on the poster for The Bad Man of Brimstone (1937)

After his Our Gang tenure ended, Beckett won increasingly prominent roles in major Hollywood films, usually playing the star's son or the hero as a boy. Among his major credits are Dante's Inferno with Spencer Tracy, Anthony Adverse with Fredric March, The Charge of the Light Brigade with Errol Flynn, Conquest with Greta Garbo, Marie Antoinette with Norma Shearer; Ali Baba and the Forty Thieves, in which he played Jon Hall's character as a child, and Kings Row, in which he played Robert Cummings's character as a child. In 1940, he played Tim in My Favorite Wife, starring Cary Grant and Irene Dunne. He appeared as one of the unborn children in Shirley Temple's The Blue Bird (1940). He also had a central role in the wartime film The Boy from Stalingrad (1943).

Beckett attended Los Angeles High School and took time off from filming to try his luck on the stage. Adolescence did not hamper his career, as he won important roles as that of young Al Jolson in The Jolson Story, with his singing voice provided by Rudy Wissler, and Junior in the radio show The Life of Riley. His performance as Jolson was described as "touching, enchanting, and to all indications, accurate". In 1947, he appeared alongside former Our Gang member Dickie Moore and Marilyn Monroe in Dangerous Years.

Beckett was signed by MGM in 1947, with his first role under contract as Will Parker in Cynthia. He gained the role of Oogie Pringle in A Date with Judy, the film adaptation of the radio series of the same name, opposite Jane Powell as Judy Foster. In 1949, he was featured in the war drama Battleground and the following year he starred as the fast-talking Tennessee Shad in the comedy The Happy Years. By 1950, the success of those three films resulted in expectations that his career would rise. Unfortunately, while other actors his age moved into leading roles, his career declined, as evidenced by his small role in Nancy Goes to Rio, again with Powell.

Beckett attended the University of Southern California, but dropped out when the combined workload of school and films became too great. Although he was working steadily at MGM, his life grew increasingly tumultuous in the late 1940s and early 1950s. In 1948, he was arrested on suspicion of drunk driving.

In 1954, Beckett's career took an upward turn when he was cast as Winky, the comic sidekick in the popular TV show Rocky Jones, Space Ranger. However, he was fired from the series after being arrested on a concealed weapons charge and for passing a bad check. According to actor Jimmy Lydon, who appeared with him in the Gasoline Alley films and also replaced him after he was fired from Rocky Jones, he earned a bad reputation due to his excessive drinking. Lydon also claimed that he made many enemies because he gambled frequently but refused to pay his gambling debts or repay money that was lent to him. After being fired from Rocky Jones, he made only a few subsequent TV and film appearances, some uncredited bit parts, before leaving show business forever.

== Post-acting life ==
After leaving the entertainment industry, Beckett sold real estate, cars, and twice enrolled at universities with the intention of becoming a physician. He was also arrested several times for drunkenness, drunk driving, drug possession, and passing bad checks. His first arrest for drunk driving came in 1948, followed by a second arrest in March 1959. In February 1957, he was arrested after attempting to cross the Mexican border with 250 "stimulant pills." On August 14, 1959, he was arrested for possessing four Benzedrine pills. He was released after twelve hours after the county prosecutor refused to press charges. Four days later, at age 29, he sustained a broken hip and skull fracture after crashing his car into a tree while driving in West Los Angeles. Lydon claimed that the accident left Beckett severely disabled and he had to utilize a wheelchair and crutches for the remainder of his life. In 1962, he attempted suicide after a heavy drinking binge.

== Personal life ==
Beckett was married three times and had one child. He married professional tennis player Beverly Baker on September 28, 1949, in Las Vegas. She was granted a divorce in June 1950. His second marriage was to model and actress Sunny Vickers. They married in 1951 and had one son, Scott Jr., before divorcing in 1957. In 1961, he married Margaret C. Sabo; she remained with him until his death.

== Death ==
On May 8, 1968, Beckett checked into a Los Angeles nursing home to seek medical attention after suffering a serious beating (the circumstances surrounding it were never made clear). He was found dead in his room on May 10. He was 38 years old. A note and pills were found, but the Los Angeles County coroner stated that an exact cause of death was unknown even though an autopsy had been performed. While no official cause of death has been listed, various media reports state that he overdosed on either barbiturates or alcohol.

Beckett is buried at San Fernando Mission Cemetery in Mission Hills, Los Angeles.

== Filmography ==
=== Short subjects ===
- Sailor Made Widow (1934)
- Hi'-Neighbor! (1934) as Scotty
- For Pete's Sake! (1934) as Scotty
- The First Round-Up (1934) as Scotty
- Honky Donkey (1934) as Scotty
- Mike Fright (1934) as Scotty
- Washee Ironee (1934) as Scotty
- Mama's Little Pirate (1934) as Scotty
- Shrimps for a Day (1934) as Scotty
- Anniversary Trouble (1935) as Scotty
- Beginner's Luck (1935) as Scotty
- Teacher's Beau (1935) as Scotty
- Sprucin' Up (1935) as Scotty
- Little Papa (1935) as Scotty
- Our Gang Follies of 1936 (1935) as Scotty
- The Lucky Corner (1936) as Scotty
- M-G-M Miniature: Little Boy Blue (1936) as The Boy
- The King Without a Crown (1937) as King Louis XVII, the Dauphin (uncredited)
- Cousin Wilbur (1939) as Wilbur Nesbitt Newcome II
- Dog Daze (1939) as Wilbur
- The Royal Rodeo (1939) as The King
- Cinderella's Feller (1940) as The Young Prince
- The Flag of Humanity (1940) as Johnny Wilson (uncredited)

=== Films ===
- Gallant Lady (1933) as Deedy - Age 2 (film debut, uncredited)
- I Am Suzanne (1933) as Child in Hospital (uncredited)
- George White's Scandals (1934) as Child (uncredited)
- Stand Up and Cheer! (1934) as Boy Auditioning for Miss Adams (uncredited)
- Whom the Gods Destroy (1934) as Jack Forrester, Age 4
- Romance in the Rain (1934) as Child Specialty
- Babes in Toyland (1934) as Schoolboy (uncredited)
- Sailor Made Widow (1934)
- Dante's Inferno (1935) as Alexander Carter
- Pursuit (1935) as Donald McCoy 'Donny' Smith
- I Dream Too Much (1935) as Boy on Carousel
- The Case Against Mrs. Ames (1936) as Bobbie Ames
- Anthony Adverse (1936) as Anthony's Son
- Old Hutch (1936) as Roy Hutchins (uncredited)
- The Charge of the Light Brigade (1936) as Prema Singh
- When You're in Love (1937) as Little Boy with Whistle (uncredited)
- A Doctor's Diary (1937) as Billy (uncredited)
- Slave Ship (1937) as Boy (uncredited)
- It Happened in Hollywood (1937) as Boy (uncredited)
- Life Begins with Love (1937) as Young Boy
- Conquest (1937) as Alexandre Walewska (uncredited)
- Wells Fargo (1937) as Young Nick Pryor (uncredited)
- The Bad Man of Brimstone (1937) as Sammy Grant (uncredited)
- No Time to Marry (1938) as Junior
- The Devil's Party (1938) as Mike O'Mara as a Child (uncredited)
- Marie Antoinette (1938) as The Dauphin
- Smashing the Rackets (1938) as Franz's Boy (uncredited)
- Listen, Darling (1938) as Billie Wingate
- Love Affair (1939) as Boy on Ship (uncredited)
- The Flying Irishman (1939) as Henry Corrigan - 7 Years Old (uncredited)
- Blind Alley (1939) as Davy
- Mickey the Kid (1939) as Bobby
- The Escape (1939) as Willie Rogers
- Our Neighbors – The Carters (1939) as Dickie Carter
- Days of Jesse James (1939) as Buster Samuels
- The Blue Bird (1940) as Child
- My Son, My Son! (1940) as Oliver as a Child
- My Favorite Wife (1940) as Tim - the Ardens' Son
- Gold Rush Maisie (1940) as Harold Davis
- Street of Memories (1940) as Tommy Foster
- Father's Son (1941) as Danny (uncredited)
- Aloma of the South Seas (1941) as Tanoa as a Child
- The Vanishing Virginian (1942) as Joel Yancey
- Kings Row (1942) as Parris Mitchell - as a Boy
- It Happened in Flatbush (1942) as Squint
- Between Us Girls (1942) as Little Prince Leopold
- The Youngest Profession (1943) as Junior Lyons
- The Boy from Stalingrad (1943) as Pavel
- Good Luck, Mr. Yates (1943) as Jimmy Dixon
- Heaven Can Wait (1943) as Henry Van Cleve - Age 9 (uncredited)
- Ali Baba and the Forty Thieves (1944) as Ali Baba as a Child
- The Climax (1944) as The King
- Circumstantial Evidence (1945) as Freddy Hanlon
- Junior Miss (1945) as Haskell Cummings Jr.
- My Reputation (1946) as Kim Drummond
- Her Adventurous Night (1946) as Junior Fry
- White Tie and Tails (1946) as Bill Latimer
- The Jolson Story (1946) as Asa Yoelson / Al Jolson, as a boy
- Cynthia (1947) as Will Parker
- Dangerous Years (1947) as Willy Miller
- A Date with Judy (1948) as Ogden 'Oogie' Pringle
- Michael O'Halloran (1948) as Michael O'Halloran
- Any Number Can Play (1949) as Paul Kyng as a Boy, in Photo (uncredited)
- Battleground (1949) as William J. Hooper
- Life of St. Paul Series (1949) as Jacob
- Nancy Goes to Rio (1950) as Scotty Sheldan
- Louisa (1950) as Jimmy Blake
- The Happy Years (1950) as 'Tennessee' Shad
- Gasoline Alley (1951) as Corky
- Corky of Gasoline Alley (1951) as Corky Wallet
- Hot News (1953) as Bill Burton
- Rocky Jones, Space Ranger (1953-1954) (TV series) as Winky
- The High and the Mighty (1954) as Coast Guard Navigator (uncredited)
- Three for Jamie Dawn (1956) as Gordon Peters
- Public Pigeon No. 1 (1957) as Photographer (uncredited)
- The Oklahoman (1957) as Messenger at Ranch (uncredited)
- Monkey on My Back (1957) as Corpsman (final film, uncredited)
