= The Arizona Wildcat (1927 film) =

1927 film

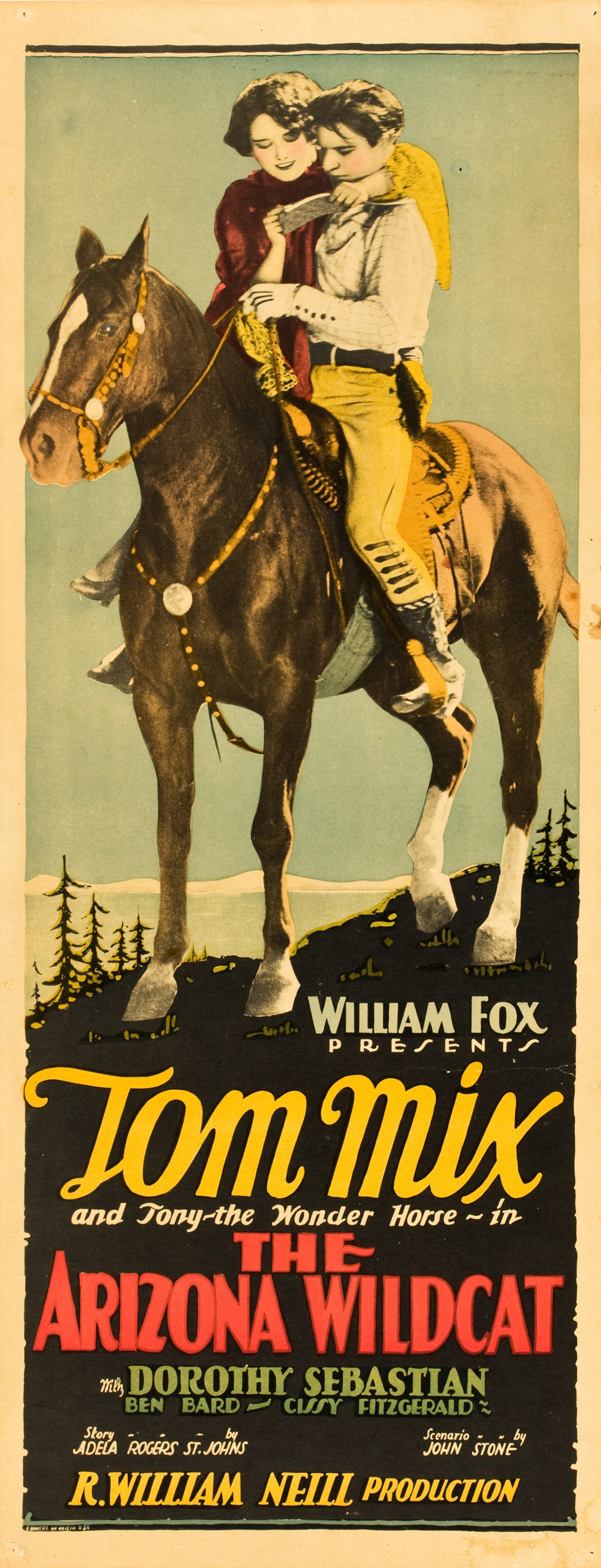
- Film poster
- Directed by: Roy William Neill
- Written by: Adela Rogers St. Johns; John Stone
- Starring: Tom Mix; Dorothy Sebastian; Ben Bard
- Cinematography: Daniel B. Clark
- Production company: Fox Film
- Distributed by: Fox Film
- Release date: November 20, 1927
- Running time: 50 minutes
- Country: United States
- Language: Silent (English intertitles)

The Arizona Wildcat is a 1927 American silent Western film directed by Roy William Neill and starring Tom Mix, Dorothy Sebastian, and Ben Bard.

== Cast ==
- Tom Mix as Tom Phelan
- Tony the Wonder Horse as Tony
- Dorothy Sebastian as Regina Schyler
- Ben Bard as Wallace Van Acker
- Cissy Fitzgerald as Mother Schyler
- Bill Elliott as Roy Schyler (as Gordon Elliott)
- Monte Collins as Low Jack Wilkins
- Doris Dawson as Marie
- Marcella Daly as Helen Van Acker

== Preservation ==
With no prints of The Arizona Wildcat located in any film archives, it is a lost film.

== Bibliography ==
- Jensen, Richard D. The Amazing Tom Mix: The Most Famous Cowboy of the Movies. 2005.
