= The Girl on the Front Page =

1936 American comedy crime film directed by Harry Beaumont

- Directed by: Harry Beaumont
- Written by: Marjorie Chanslor; Roy Chanslor; Harry Clork; Alice D. G. Miller; George Owen; Austin Parker; Albert R. Perkins
- Produced by: Robert Presnell Sr.; Charles R. Rogers
- Starring: Edmund Lowe; Gloria Stuart; Reginald Owen
- Cinematography: Milton R. Krasner
- Edited by: Philip Cahn
- Music by: Heinz Roemheld
- Production company: Universal Pictures
- Distributed by: Universal Pictures
- Release date: September 27, 1936
- Running time: 75 minutes
- Country: United States
- Language: English

The Girl on the Front Page is a 1936 American comedy crime film directed by Harry Beaumont and starring Edmund Lowe, Gloria Stuart and Reginald Owen. It was produced and distributed by Hollywood major Universal Pictures.

== Plot ==
After inheriting a newspaper from her father, the socialite Joan Langford clashes with the managing editor Hank Gilman. He is a hard-bitten newsman who resents her interference in the running of the paper. Disguising herself as an aspiring young journalist, she gets a job at the paper. Although Gilman is in fact well aware of who she is and assigns her to very difficult assignments to convince her that the newspaper business is not for her. However she eventually gains his respect, and together they thwart an attempt at blackmail by Langford's British butler who is revealed to be the head of a society of criminal servants.

== Main cast ==
- Edmund Lowe as Hank Gilman
- Gloria Stuart as Joan Langford
- Reginald Owen as Archie Biddle
- Spring Byington as Mrs. Langford
- Gilbert Emery as Thorne
- David Oliver as Flash
- Robert Gleckler as Bill
- Phillip Trent as Edward
- Maxine Reiner as Annette

== Bibliography ==
- Gates, Phillipa. Detecting Women: Gender and the Hollywood Detective Film. SUNY Press, 2011.
