= Olive Brasno =

American actress (1917–98)

- Brasno in Charlie Chan at the Circus, 1936
- Born: October 17, 1917; Old Bridge, New Jersey, US
- Died: January 25, 1998 (aged 80); Lakeland, Florida, U.S.
- Resting place: Saint Marys Cemetery, East Brunswick, New Jersey
- Occupations: Actress, dancer
- Years active: 1933–1959
- Spouse: Gus Wayne (~1961-1998) (his death)

Olive Brasno (October 17, 1917 – January 25, 1998) was a dwarf dancer and actress who was known for her song and dance act with her brother, George. She also appeared in a few films through the 1930s and 1940s.

Born in the community of Old Bridge, New Jersey, and later residing in South River, Olive and George Brasno were first recognized as a brother-and-sister dwarf singing team in a partnership with Buster Shaver's vaudeville act.

== Career ==
Dancer/actress Olive Brasno Wayne spent the bulk of her career performing on stage, but she also occasionally appeared in feature films. She launched her professional career dancing and singing in vaudeville along with her brother George Brasno. The act was called "Buster Shaver, Olive and George", and it toured nationally. She and George appeared in Little Miss Broadway (1938) opposite Shirley Temple. Other film credits include The Mighty Barnum (1934) and Sitting Pretty (1933). She and her brother appeared in one of the original Charlie Chan films with Warner Oland, Charlie Chan at the Circus (1936). She also appeared with her brother in the Our Gang films Shrimps for a Day (1934) and Arbor Day (1936).

She was offered a part as a "Munchkin" in The Wizard of Oz (1939) but turned it down because she and her brother were making more money in vaudeville.

== Personal life ==
Olive Brasno married dwarf actor Gus Wayne, who played one of the Munchkin soldiers in The Wizard of Oz; the couple were married for 37 years.

== Death ==
Olive Brasno died in Lakeland, Florida, on January 25, 1998, at the age of 80. After 37 years of marriage, she outlived her husband by two days.
