= Sunday Dinner for a Soldier =

1944 film by Lloyd Bacon

- Directed by: Lloyd Bacon
- Written by: Martha Cheavens (story); Melvin Levy; Wanda Tuchock
- Produced by: Walter Morosco
- Starring: Anne Baxter; John Hodiak
- Cinematography: Joseph MacDonald
- Edited by: J. Watson Webb Jr.
- Music by: Alfred Newman
- Distributed by: 20th Century Fox
- Release date: December 8, 1944
- Running time: 85 minutes
- Country: United States
- Language: English
- Box office: $2 million

Sunday Dinner for a Soldier is a 1944 American drama romance war film directed by Lloyd Bacon and starring Anne Baxter and John Hodiak. It is based on a novelette by Martha Cheavens.

== Plot ==
A poor family in Florida saves all the money they can in order to plan a Sunday dinner for a soldier at a local Army airbase. They don't realize that their request to invite the soldier never got mailed. On the day of the scheduled dinner, another soldier is brought to their home and love soon blossoms between him (Hodiak) and Tessa (Baxter), the young woman who runs the home.

== Cast ==
- Anne Baxter as Tessa
- John Hodiak as Eric Moore
- Charles Winninger as Grandfather
- Anne Revere as Agatha
- Chill Wills as Mr. York
- Robert Bailey as Kenneth Normand
- Bobby Driscoll as Jeep
- Jane Darwell as Mrs. Dobson

== Radio adaptation ==
On February 19, 1945, Baxter, Hodiak, and Winninger appeared in a radio adaptation of the film on Lux Radio Theatre.
