= Gus Meins =

German film director (1893–1940)

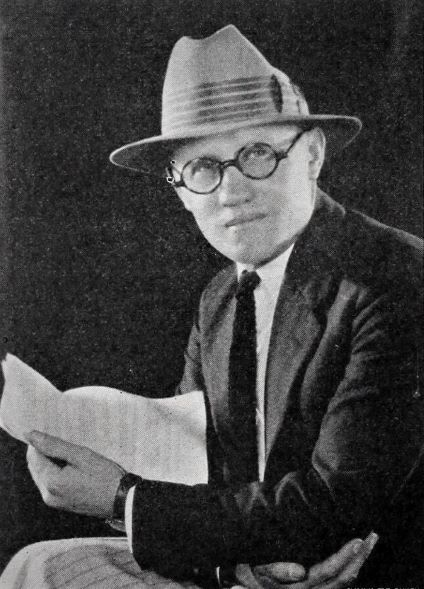
- From a 1925 magazine
- Born: Gustave Peter Ludwig Luley; March 6, 1893; Frankfurt, Germany
- Died: August 1, 1940 (aged 47); La Crescenta, California, US
- Occupation: Film director
- Years active: 1922 - 1940

Gus Meins (March 6, 1893 – August 1, 1940), born Gustave Peter Ludwig Luley, was an American film director. He was born in Frankfurt, Germany.

== Career ==
Meins started out in the ‘teens as a cartoonist for the Los Angeles Evening Herald before becoming a comedy writer for Fox Film in 1919.

In the 1920s, Meins directed a number of silent short subjects film series for Universal Pictures, including the Buster Brown comedies. He is best known as senior director of Hal Roach's Our Gang comedies from 1934 to 1936, and also as director of Laurel and Hardy's Babes in Toyland (1934). His assistant director was a young Gordon Douglas, who became senior director in 1936 when Meins left Our Gang for other directing jobs at Roach. Meins left Roach in 1937 over creative differences.

== Death ==
In the summer of 1940, Meins faced prosecution on "morals charges", having been accused of sex offenses against six youths. The director swore his innocence but stated that the case would ruin his career, regardless of the outcome. He left home on the night of Thursday, August 1 telling his son, Douglas: "You probably won't see me again."

Meins was found dead in his car on August 4, reportedly having committed suicide by inhaling carbon monoxide days earlier. Bizarrely, the circumstances of his death in a car from suffocation were reminiscent of the demise five years earlier of comedian Thelma Todd, whom he had frequently directed.

He was interred at Grand View Memorial Park Cemetery in Glendale, California.

He was generally remembered as 'a cheerful, convivial gentleman'. His son Douglas Meins (1918–1987) appeared in at least seven Republic and Warner films in the late 1930s and early 1940s; he then served in the U.S. Army Corps during World War II.

== Selected filmography ==
Feature films:

- Babes in Toyland (1934), starring Laurel and Hardy
- His Exciting Night (1939)
- The Covered Trailer (1939)

ZaSu Pitts/Thelma Todd shorts:

- Sneak Easily (1933)
- Asleep in the Feet (1933)
- Maids à la Mode (1933)
- One Track Minds (1933)

Thelma Todd/Patsy Kelly shorts:

- Beauty and the Bus (1933)
- Backs to Nature (1933)
- Air Fright (1933)
- Babes in the Goods (1934)
- Soup and Fish (1934)
- Maid in Hollywood (1934)
- I'll Be Suing You (1934)
- Three Chumps Ahead (1934)
- One-Horse Farmers (1934)
- Done In Oil (1934)
- An All-American Toothache (1936)
- Hill-Tillies (1936)

Our Gang shorts:

- Second Childhood (1936)
- The Lucky Corner (1936)
- Our Gang Follies of 1936 (1935)
- Little Sinner (1935)
- Little Papa (1935)
- Sprucin' Up (1935)
- Teacher's Beau (1935)
- Beginner's Luck (1935)
- Anniversary Trouble (1935)
- Shrimps for a Day (1934)
- Mama's Little Pirate (1934)
- Mike Fright (1934)
- Honky Donkey (1934)
- The First Round-Up (1934)
- For Pete's Sake! (1934)
- Hi'-Neighbor! (1934)
