= Sprucin' Up =

- Directed by: Gus Meins
- Produced by: Hal Roach
- Cinematography: Art Lloyd
- Edited by: Louis McManus
- Music by: Marvin Hatley; Leroy Shield
- Distributed by: MGM
- Release date: June 1, 1935
- Running time: 16:45
- Country: United States
- Language: English

Sprucin' Up is a 1935 Our Gang short comedy film directed by Gus Meins. It was the 137th Our Gang short to be released.

== Plot ==
Hoping to get on the good side of the new truant officer (Dick Elliott), the gang goes out of their way to impress the man's cute daughter (Marianne Edwards), even unto making such sacrifices as taking baths, combing hair, shining shoes, and washing behind the ears.

Both Spanky and Alfalfa pay a social call on Marianne, and before long, the two lifelong pals have become romantic rivals. Ultimately, Spanky and Alfalfa stage an athletic competition to determine who is the better man, an undertaking with prickly results.

== Note ==
Sprucin' Up was originally going to be known as Good Night Ladies.

According to The Lucky Corner Web Site, the boys can be identified in the scene where they are sitting on the curb, from left to right as: Harold Switzer, Robert Lenz, Alvin Buckelew, Scotty Beckett, George "Spanky" McFarland, Billie "Buckwheat" Thomas, Carl "Alfalfa" Switzer, and Donald Proffitt.

== Cast ==
=== The Gang ===
- George McFarland as Spanky
- Carl Switzer as Alfalfa
- Scotty Beckett as Scotty
- Billie Thomas as Buckwheat
- Alvin Buckelew as Alvin
- Donald Proffitt as Our Gang member
- Robert Lentz as Our Gang member
- Harold Switzer as Harold
- Pete the Pup as himself

=== Additional cast ===
- Marianne Edwards as Miss Jones, the new girl
- Jerry Tucker as Percy
- Harry Bernard as Officer Riley
- James P. Burtis as Real estate agent
- Dick Elliott as Mr. Jones, father
- Bess Flowers as Scotty's mother
- Leota Lorraine as Spanky's mother
- Lillian Rich as Mrs. Jones, mother
- Gertrude Sutton as Alfalfa's mother
- Viola Richard as Second pedestrian
- Lester Dorr as First pedestrian
- Billy Bletcher as Scotty's father (scenes deleted)
- Blanche Payson as Scotty's mother (scenes deleted)

== See also ==
- Our Gang filmography
