= Maxine Reiner =

American actress (1916–2003)

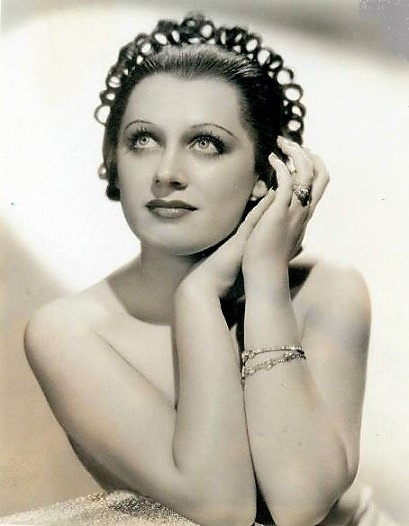
- Publicity photo of Reiner in 1935
- Born: March 16, 1916; Tamaqua, Pennsylvania, U.S.
- Died: June 19, 2003 (aged 87); Los Angeles, California, U.S.
- Other names: Maxine Sokolov
- Occupation: Actress
- Years active: 1935–1936
- Spouses: Joseph I. Myerson (m. 1935; div. 1936) Harry Eliot Sokolov (m. 1937; div. 1950) Frank M. Grossman (m. 1950)
- Children: 1

Maxine Reiner (March 16, 1916 – June 19, 2003) was an American actress. She was more noted for off-screen marital troubles than for her film performances.

== Early life and education ==
Reiner was born in Tamaqua, Pennsylvania, the daughter of Bernard Reiner and Ida Eisenberg Reiner. Her family was Jewish. Her father owned a chain of women's specialty shops, and his father was a jeweler.

She attended a school of elocution and dramatic art in Philadelphia, and acted in plays there.

== Career ==
Reiner modeled for advertisements and in swimsuits as a young woman. She moved to Los Angeles with her mother and sister after high school, to seek a career in the film business. She was soon under contract with Paramount Pictures, and later with Universal Pictures. Her first film was Wanderer of the Wasteland (1935).

She also had screen credits in Charlie Chan at the Circus (1936), Sins of Man (1936), and The Girl on the Front Page (1936), and smaller uncredited roles in It Had to Happen (1936) and Flying Hostess (1936).

== Personal life ==
Reiner married a friend of her parents', businessman Joseph I. Myerson, in 1935; they divorced in 1936, in a contested trial that made headlines. "She said she earned more money than I did and didn't need me," Myerson told The Los Angeles Times in February 1936.

Her second husband was film producer Harry Eliot Sokolov. They married in 1937, had a son, Thomas, born in 1943, and lived in Beverly Hills, California, with her mother and younger sister; they divorced in 1950.

She was linked in gossip columns with author Max Rubinstein in 1951. Her third husband was Frank M. Grossman; they were married briefly in the 1950s.

== Death ==
Reiner died in Los Angeles in 2003, aged 87 years. Her son, Thomas R. Sokolov, is a judge on the Superior Court of Los Angeles County. Her younger sister was cookbook author Naomi Shuwarger.
