= Ben Bard =

American actor (1893–1974)

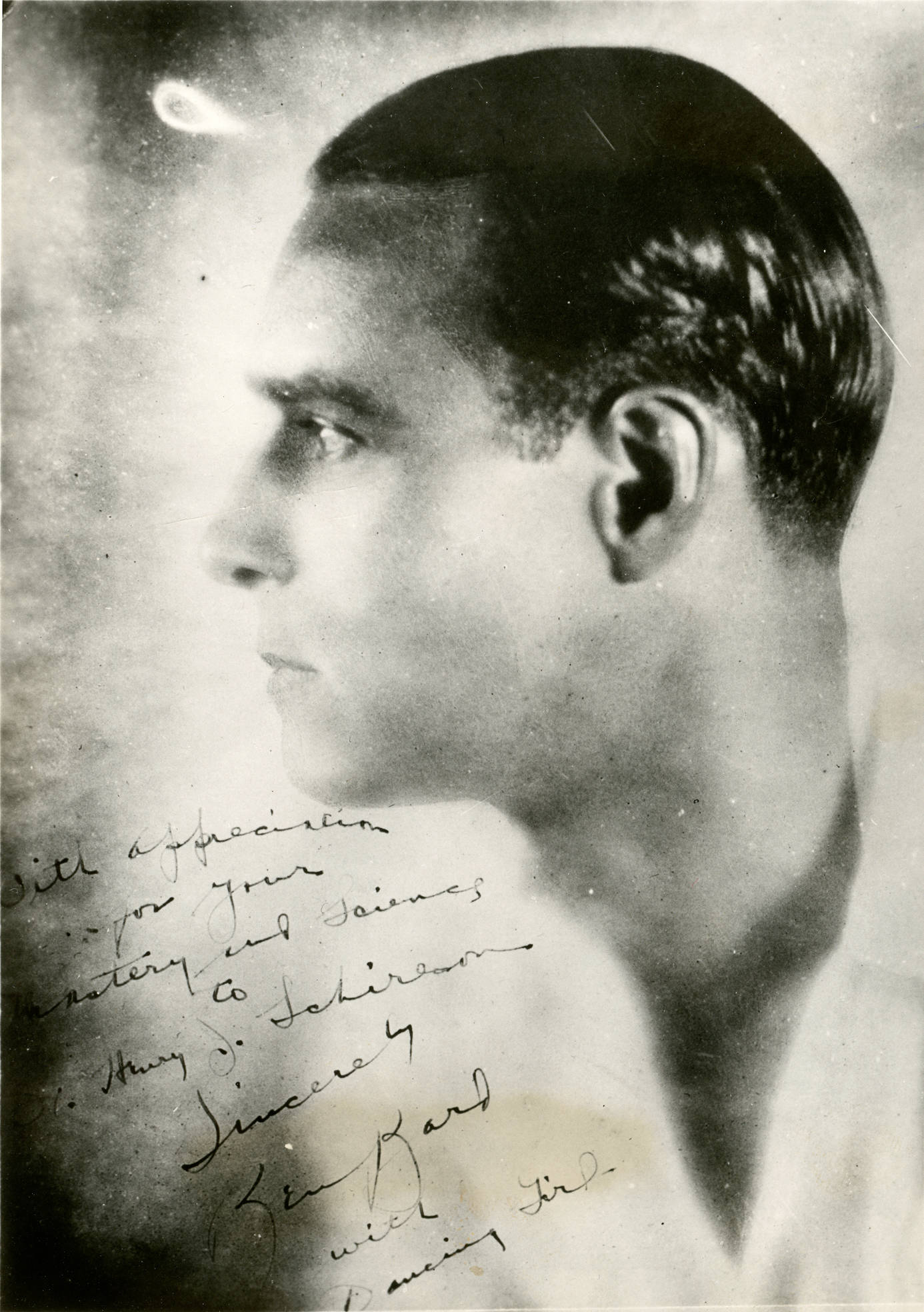
- Born: Benjamin Greenberg; January 26, 1893; Milwaukee, Wisconsin, U.S.
- Died: May 17, 1974 (aged 81); Los Angeles, California, U.S.
- Resting place: Forest Lawn Memorial Park; Great Mausoleum; Azalea Terrace; Ruth Roland's family crypt
- Occupations: Film, stage actor
- Spouses: Ruth Roland (m. 1929; died 1937) Roma Clarisse (m. 1939; died 1947) Jackie Lynn Taylor (m. 1948; div. 1954)

Ben Bard (born Benjamin Greenberg; January 26, 1893 – May 17, 1974) was an American actor, comedian, and baritone who worked in musical theatre, vaudeville, and film. He began his career in the early 1910s; achieving initial success in musicals and vaudeville as a singer. As he gained more experience his abilities branched out into dancing and acting. In 1917 he toured in Rag Doll in Ragland which included a stop on Broadway at the Olympic Theatre. He spent the next eight years performing in a variety of touring musical revues with intermittent work in vaudeville between shows.

With M. K. Jerome, Bard co-wrote the music to the revue Razzle Dazzle of 1918. In 1921 he was cast in the touring production of The Whirl of New York as a straight man for the comedian Jack Pearl. He and Pearl formed a double act which they played both in vaudeville and in musicals; including performances in the Broadway shows The Dancing Girl (1923) and Topics of 1923. After taking their show to the Orpheum Circuit in California in 1925, Bard left his partnership with Pearl and worked as a film actor in Los Angeles from 1926 through 1946. In the 1930s he founded the Ben Bard Dramatic School and became a celebrated drama teacher in L.A. He continued to teach until as late as 1969.

== Early life and career ==
Benjamin Dixon Greenberg was born in Milwaukee, Wisconsin on January 26, 1893. He worked as a neckware salesman in Illinois before becoming a singer and actor. He adopted the stage name Ben Bard; appearing under that name as early as 1911 in the musicals The Queen of Spooneyland and The Hen Peck Family at the Shubert Theatre in Salt Lake City, Utah in which he was a featured singer. In 1912 he became a song plugger for Harry Von Tilzer's music publishing company. He began working in vaudeville that year in Chicago under Von Tilzer's sponsorship to promote his company's songs for sheet music sales. In 1913 he worked as a cabaret singer in Chicago before working in Jacksonville, Florida as a singer at the Prince Theater.

In 1914 Bard performed at the Ideal Theater in Columbia, South Carolina with the local paper stated he possessed a "40 horsepower voice, singing anything from opera to ragtime" and "proved himself to be a high class singing act." Later that year he was engaged as a singer at theaters in Wisconsin before working in vaudeville for the B. F. Keith circuit. By December 1914 he was back in Chicago working as a restaurant singer at Golden Pheasant Inn where he was advertised as a baritone. In 1915 he was employed as a singer at A. G. Bainbridge's theater in Minneapolis in shows like the musical revue West Night Hotel. In 1916 he worked in a singing act in vaudeville with Charles Weller in the Orpheum Circuit.

In 1917 Bard starred in the musical Rag Doll in Ragland on tour in venues like the Lyric Theater in Dayton, Ohio, the Gayety Theatre in Buffalo, New York, and a brief stop on Broadway at the Casino Theatre before moving to the Gayety Theatre in Brooklyn. After this he joined the theatre troupe Billy Watson's Oriental Burlesquers for performances in Massachusetts; including at Boston's Howard Athenaeum in August 1917. The company then moved to Broadway's Olympic Theatre in September 1917 where they presented the triple bill The Doll Shop, At Fort Hoakum and At the Fair. The company then resumed touring nationally in the 1917–1918 season with Bard as a member for performance in theaters in Wisconsin, Michigan, Missouri, Iowa, Indiana, Ohio, Pennsylvania, and Maryland. After this he partnered with Jack Wilson in vaudeville in the B. F. Keith circuit in 1918.

== Later life and career ==
=== Razzle Dazzle of 1918 and Powder Puff Revue ===
Bard and M. K. Jerome co-composed the music to the music revue Razzle Dazzle of 1918 which was produced by Harry Hastings and premiered at the Broadway Theatre in Camden, New Jersey in August 1918. This show subsequently toured in 1918–1919 to theaters in Massachusetts, Pennsylvania, Washington D.C., and Brooklyn. After the close of this tour he performed in the burlesque Manhattan Please (also known as Girls al la Carte) in 1919 at theaters in New Jersey, Connecticut, Massachusetts, New York, Pennsylvania, Maryland, and Washington D.C. By November 1919 he had left this production and performing once again as a headline singer in the Orpheum Circuit in New Orleans, but resumed working in the Girls a la Carte tour in January 1920 when the show reached Omaha, Nebraska. He was still in the show when it reached the Columbia Theatre in New York City in April 1920.

In the 1920–1921 season Bard performed in Arthur Pearson's Powder Puff Revue which opened at the Gaiety Theatre in Boston in August 1920. The show than toured to Hartford, Connecticut where the local paper stated that Bard carried the show with several interesting songs and dances. Some other stops on the tour included performances in Brooklyn, Washington D.C., Baltimore, Philadelphia, Pittsburgh, Akron, Ohio, Cleveland, Des Moines, Iowa, Omaha, Nebraska, Kansas City, Missouri, Detroit, Toronto, Montreal, and Buffalo, New York. In March 1921 it played at the Columbia Theatre in New York City.

=== Bard and Pearl ===
In October 1921 Bard joined the cast of The Whirl of New York for its national tour in which he was partnered in a "chatter and patter" act with comedian Jack Pearl. When the tour moved on from Pittsburgh to Cincinnati, The Cincinnati Enquirer review highlighted his work as an effective straight man for Pearl. The production toured to other American cities in 1921–1922; including St. Louis, Indianapolis, Philadelphia, Boston, Toronto, Chicago, and Washington D.C. After this show he worked in partnership with Pearl as a comic duo in vaudeville. In summer of 1922 they were engaged at Keeney's Theatre in Brooklyn. After this they appeared together in the revue Spice of 1922 which opened in Atlantic City, New Jersey in August 1922 with a cast led by Adele Rowland. This was followed by more performances together on tour in The Whirl of New York in the fall of 1922.

Bard and Pearl starred in the 1923 Broadway musical revue The Dancing Girl which opened at the Winter Garden Theatre in January 1923. Bard portrayed the Chief Inspector and Pearl his assistant. In the 1923–1924 season they performed together in the Broadway musical revue Topics of 1923 at first the Broadhurst Theatre and later at the Winter Garden Theatre. They also performed excerpts of this show on the radio. After this they appeared in the musical Artists and Models (1924) which was produced by the Shubert family, and then toured in vaudeville in their show Good Little Devils (1924–1925) before rejoining the touring cast of Artists and Models from performances from April 1925 through June 1925. After this Bard and Pearl worked at the Orpheum Theatre in San Francisco and the Orpheum Theatre in Los Angeles in late summer 1925.

=== Film actor ===
While working at the Orpheum in Los Angeles, Bard befriended the serial film actress Ruth Roland, and newspaper gossip columns began speculating about the nature of their friendship in October 1925. They formed a romantic attachment and ultimately married in 1929. Their marriage lasted until Rowland's death in 1937. Bard began working pictures in 1926. That year he, Pearl, and Sascha Beaumont appeared in an early short film with sound, Jack Pearl and Ben Bard, made in Lee DeForest's Phonofilm sound-on-film process which according to one scholar had "credible sound". After this he signed a six picture film contract with the Fox Film Corporation which was later extended into longer term work.

Bard initially worked as a leading man in silent films for Fox; including Sandy (1926), My Own Pal (1926), 7th Heaven (1927), Two Flaming Youths (1927), The Arizona Wildcat (1927), Love Makes 'Em Wild (1927), The Secret Studio (1927), Come to My House (1927), Dressed to Kill (1928), No Other Woman (1928), and Fleetwing (1928) among others. He transitioned into sound films. Some of his other film credits include Romance of the Underworld (1928), Love and the Devil (1929), Born Reckless (1930), The Bat Whispers (1930), Meet the Baron (1933), The Seventh Victim (1943), The Leopard Man (1943), The Ghost Ship (1943), Youth Runs Wild (1944), and Black Angel (1946).

=== Ben Bard Dramatic School and later life ===
By 1934 Bard had founded the Ben Bard Dramatic School (BBDS) in Los Angeles which offered training in both stage and film acting. The school had a theatre company attached to it, the Ben Bard Players, which gave opportunities to its students to perform in professional quality productions. This company performed productions at the Ben Bard Playhouse (also known as the Ben Bard Theater) on Wilshire Boulevard in L.A. which were directed by Bard The BBDS became one of the more prominent and respected acting schools in Hollywood. Some prominent alumni of the school included Turhan Bey, Jack Carson, Angie Dickinson, Alan Ladd, Cliff Robertson, Shirley Temple, and Gig Young. In September 1956 Bard was appointed head of the New Talent Department at Twentieth-Century-Fox in September 1956, at which time he stepped away from the BBDS.

Bard worked as a dialogue director for MGM during the 1960s, and resumed teaching at BBDS after leaving Twentieth-Century-Fox. He was still teaching at BBDS as late as 1969.

== Personal life and death ==
In 1929 Bard married the serial film star Ruth Roland, and was married to Roland until her death in 1937. In 1939, he married Roma Clarisse, an actress and last recipient of the Ruth Roland Scholarship to Ben Bard Drama. They had 3 children before she died in 1947. He subsequently married Jackie Lynn Taylor, an actress in the Our Gang series.

Bard died in Los Angeles on May 17, 1974, aged 81. His resting place is with Ruth Roland in an unmarked grave in the Great Mausoleum at Forest Lawn Memorial Park in Glendale, California.
