= Marianne Edwards =

American child actress (1930–2013)

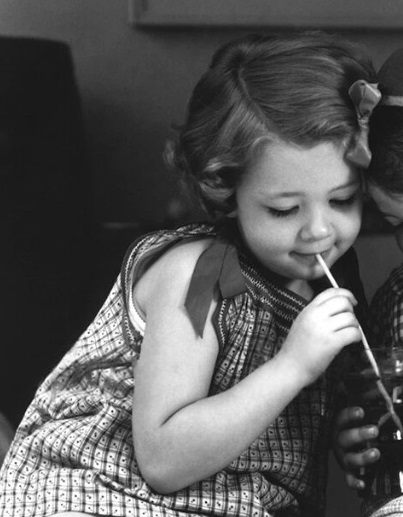
- Born: December 9, 1930; Los Angeles, California, U.S.
- Died: November 8, 2013 (aged 82)
- Occupation: Film actress
- Years active: 1933–1939

Marianne Edwards (December 9, 1930 – November 8, 2013) was an American child actress who appeared in the Our Gang film series from 1934 to 1936. She also appeared in several feature films in the 1930s, including Gold Diggers Of 1933, Babes In Toyland, and Stand Up and Cheer!.

Edwards was signed to a five-year contract with Hal Roach Studios in 1935, when she was just four years old, and publicized as competition for Shirley Temple.

Edwards' most memorable Our Gang appearance was as the five-year-old Amateur Night contestant "Daisy Dimple, Dancer Par Excellence" suddenly stricken with stage fright in Beginner's Luck. In the film George "Spanky" McFarland wins the prize money for her so she can buy her dancing costume ("Girlie, the dress is in the bag!"). In another classic installment, Edwards was wooed by Spanky and Carl "Alfalfa" Switzer in Sprucin' Up, only to be won over by rich kid Jerry Tucker.

== Selected filmography ==
- Little Miss Thoroughbred (1938)
- Love Is on the Air (1937) (uncredited)
- Hollywood Hotel (1937)
- Stand-In (1937)
- Jungle Jim (1936–1937 serial)
- The Lucky Corner (1936)
- The Pinch Singer (1936)
- Sprucin' Up (1935)
- Teacher's Beau (1935)
- Beginner's Luck (1935)
- Babes in Toyland (1934)
- Air Hawks (1934)
- Shrimps for a Day (1934)
- For Pete's Sake! (1934)
- Stand Up and Cheer! (1934)
- Gold Diggers of 1933 (1933)
