= Penny Serenade =

1941 film by George Stevens

- Theatrical release poster
- Directed by: George Stevens
- Screenplay by: Morrie Ryskind
- Based on: Penny Serenade (1940 McCall's story) by Martha Cheavens
- Produced by: George Stevens
- Starring: Irene Dunne; Cary Grant; Beulah Bondi
- Cinematography: Joseph Walker
- Edited by: Otto Meyer
- Music by: W. Franke Harling
- Color process: Black and white
- Production company: Columbia Pictures
- Distributed by: Columbia Pictures
- Release date: April 24, 1941 (USA)
- Running time: 120 minutes
- Country: United States
- Language: English
- Box office: $835,000

Penny Serenade is a 1941 American melodrama film directed by George Stevens starring Irene Dunne and Cary Grant as a loving couple who must overcome adversity to keep their marriage and raise a child. It was produced and distributed by Columbia Pictures. Grant was nominated for the Academy Award for Best Actor for his performance.

== Plot ==
Penny Serenade (1941)

The film charts the meeting, courtship and marriage of Julie Gardiner and Roger Adams through the playing of popular songs relevant to each time period. After their spur-of-the-moment marriage on New Year's Eve and a night in Roger's train compartment en route to San Francisco, a now pregnant Julie rejoins Roger in Tokyo, where he has a stint as a reporter. Julie loses their unborn child in the 1923 Tokyo earthquake and returns with Roger to California. They are despondent, until their friend Applejack Carney encourages them to adopt a child. While Roger struggles to keep his newspaper going in the (fictional) California town of Rosalia, Julie keeps house and fits out the nursery.

They apply at an adoption agency for a two-year-old boy, and receive a call from the agency's Miss Oliver to say that a five-week-old baby girl is available. Though Roger would have preferred a boy, he falls in love with the baby, and he and Julie care for her during their one-year probation period. At the end of that time, Roger has lost his newspaper, and the law prevents him from adopting the baby without an income. Roger appears before the judge and delivers an impassioned plea to keep the child, whom he considers his own. The judge awards custody, and Roger returns home to Julie with their daughter.

Years later, Roger and Julie swell with pride as their daughter, Trina, not yet old enough to play an angel in the Christmas play, plays the "echo" instead. The following Christmas, Julie writes to Miss Oliver that Trina has died from a sudden illness. The child's death sends Roger into a deep depression, and Julie resolves to leave him, believing he no longer needs her. Just as she is about to leave for the train station, the couple receive a phone call from Miss Oliver, saying that a two-year-old boy, as they had previously asked for, has just become available for adoption and she is giving them priority. Roger and Julie embrace, ready to rebuild their marriage with a new child.

== Cast ==
- Irene Dunne as Julie Gardiner (Adams)
- Cary Grant as Roger Adams
- Beulah Bondi as Miss Oliver
- Edgar Buchanan as Applejack Carney
- Ann Doran as Dotty "Dot"
- Eva Lee Kuney as Trina (age 6)
- Leonard Willey as Doctor Hartley
- Wallis Clark as Judge
- Walter Soderling as Billings
- Jane Biffle (listed as "Baby Biffle" in end-credits) as Trina (age 1)

== Production ==
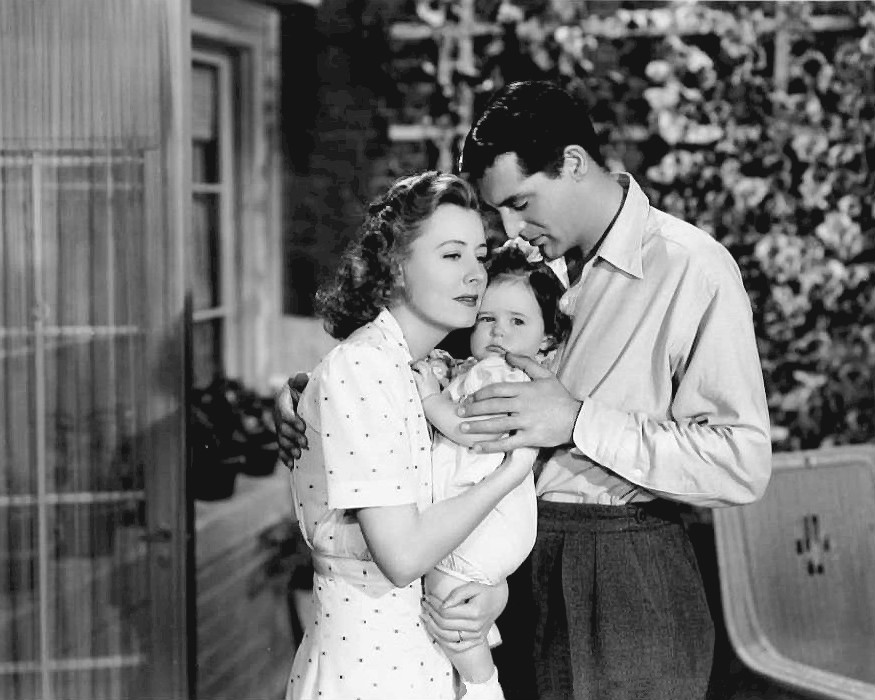
Grant and Dunne with Baby Biffle in a scene from the film

=== Development ===
For $25,000, Columbia Pictures purchased the rights to a story by Martha Cheavens published in McCall's and engaged Cheavens as script consultant. Morrie Ryskind was credited for the screenplay.

The film depicts the passage of time through the playing of songs. According to George Stevens' papers stored at the Academy of Motion Picture Arts and Sciences library, Stevens kept close track of the chronology of the songs to accurately match them to the different time periods in the script. These songs include "The Japanese Sandman", "These Foolish Things", "Just a Memory", "Three O'Clock in the Morning", "Ain't We Got Fun", and "The Prisoner's Song".

=== Casting ===
Penny Serenade is the third of three films pairing Grant and Dunne, each time playing a married couple.

At the time, California law restricted the time an infant could be present in a film studio to two hours per day; during that time, the infant could be kept on a sound stage for only one hour, and be filmed under the studio lights for only twenty minutes at a time. To double the amount of time he could film the character of Trina both as a baby and as a one-year-old, Stevens hired identical twin girls for Trina at each age. The baby was played by Judith and Dianna Fleetwood, and the one-year-old by Joan and Jane Biffle.

=== Filming ===
Filming took place from October 14, 1940, to January 15, 1941.

== Release ==
The film was released on April 24, 1941. For its promotion in Philadelphia, Ray Wolf, Manager of Affiliated circuit's Frolic Theatre, distributed chocolate pennies both door to door as well as on busy street corners during rush hours.

== Critical reception ==
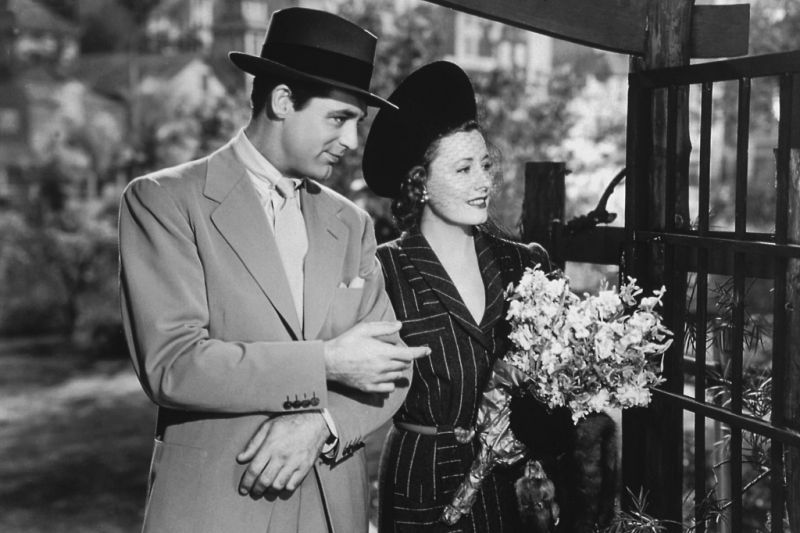
Grant and Dunne in Penny Serenade

On the review aggregator website Rotten Tomatoes, 94% of 18 critics' reviews are positive, with an average rating of 7.50/10. Variety commended both the direction and the acting for lifting the script out of maudlin melodrama. Describing the plot elements as "tenderness, heart-throb, comedy and good, old-fashioned, gulping tears", the review notes: "Half a dozen times the yarn approaches the saccharine, only to be turned back into sound, human comedy-drama". A Time review also lauded Stevens' direction, stating: "Grant and Dunne cannot overcome the ten-little-fingers-and-ten-little-toes plot ... it is too often a moving picture which does not move. Skillful direction saves it from turning maudlin". Radio Times said that Grant "gives a lesson in screen acting and was rightly Oscar-nominated for a superb, subtly-shaded portrayal that keeps sentimentality at bay".

When the movie premiered at the Radio City Music Hall, Bosley Crowther, in a somewhat ambivalent review, concludes "[there is] some very credible acting on the part of Mr. Grant and Miss Dunne is responsible in the main for the infectious quality of the film. Edgar Buchanan, too, gives an excellent performance as a good-old-Charlie friend, and Beulah Bondi is sensible as an orphanage matron. Heart-warming is the word for both of them. As a matter of fact, the whole picture deliberately cozies up to the heart. Noël Coward once dryly observed how extraordinarily potent cheap music is. That is certainly true of Penny Serenade".

Grant considered his role in Penny Serenade as his best performance. Dunne often remarked that this was her favorite film "because it reminded her of her own adopted daughter".

== Accolades ==
Grant was nominated for the Academy Award for Best Actor for his performance. He lost to Gary Cooper's portrayal of Sergeant York at the 14th Academy Awards.

== Adaptations ==
Penny Serenade was dramatized as a half-hour radio play on the November 16, 1941, broadcast of The Screen Guild Theater, starring Cary Grant and Irene Dunne in their original roles. It was also presented as an hour-long drama on Lux Radio Theater, first on April 27, 1942, with Robert Taylor and Barbara Stanwyck, and then on May 8, 1944, starring Joseph Cotten and Irene Dunne. Dunne again starred in July 1953 on CBS Radio's General Electric Theater.

A television adaptation for Lux Video Theatre, starring Phyllis Thaxter and Don Taylor, was broadcast on January 13, 1955, on NBC.

== Copyright status and home media ==
The copyright on Penny Serenade was not renewed when its initial 28-year term expired and it entered the public domain in 1970. Subsequently, the film has seen many releases by budget labels on various home video formats, but all are of very poor quality and most, but not all, are missing a pivotal five-minute scene in which Grant pleads with a judge to be allowed to adopt despite the failure of his newspaper. The original elements are now with Paramount Global (under Paramount Pictures), via the company's former Republic Pictures library. Using these elements, Penny Serenade has been released uncut and in high quality on Blu-ray and DVD in the US (Olive Films, 2013) and Germany (Alive, 2017).

== In popular culture ==
The main character in Ang Lee's Lust, Caution (2007) watches Penny Serenade in a Shanghai movie theater showing Western films.

In the film Thelma & Louise (1991), state police and FBI personnel watch Penny Serenade on late-night television while monitoring a phone tap at Thelma's home in Arkansas. (Only the film's audio is briefly heard.)

In The Sopranos episode "The Weight" (2002), Ginny Sacrimoni claims to be up late because Penny Serenade was on AMC, when in fact she was weighing herself.
