= Charlie Chan at the Circus =

1936 film by Harry Lachman

- Directed by: Harry Lachman
- Written by: Robert Ellis
- Produced by: John Stone
- Starring: Warner Oland
- Cinematography: Daniel B. Clark
- Edited by: Alex Troffey
- Production company: 20th Century Fox
- Distributed by: 20th Century Fox
- Release date: March 27, 1936
- Running time: 72 minutes
- Country: United States

Charlie Chan at the Circus is the 11th film produced by Fox starring Warner Oland as Charlie Chan. A seemingly harmless family outing drags a vacationing Chan into a murder investigation.

The film's sets were designed by the art director Duncan Cramer.

== Plot ==
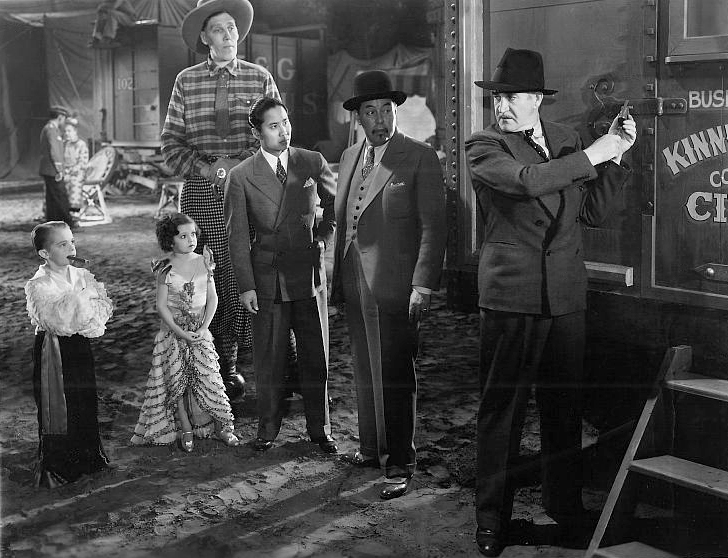
Keye Luke and Warner Oland in Charlie Chan at the Circus

Charlie Chan takes his wife and twelve children on an outing to a circus after receiving a free pass from one of the owners, Joe Kinney. Kinney wants Chan to find out who is sending him anonymous threatening letters. Nearly all of the circus workers are suspects since Kinney is very unpopular. However, when Chan goes to meet him during the night's performance, he finds the man dead, seemingly killed by a rampaging gorilla who somehow escaped from his cage.

Lieutenant Macy takes charge of the investigation, assisted by Chan and his overzealous eldest son Lee, who also takes the opportunity to (unsuccessfully) romance Su Toy, the contortionist. On Chan's advice, Macy lets the circus continue to its next stop, with the trio tagging along. During the train ride, an attempt is made to murder Chan with a poisonous cobra.

Then someone tries to break into the circus's safe, but nothing is missing. Macy finds a marriage certificate inside, showing that Kinney supposedly married circus wardrobe lady Nellie Farrell in Mexico. However, Kinney's fiancé Marie Norman claims that she can prove Kinney was not in Mexico on the day indicated on the certificate. Before she can prove it, during her act, someone shoots one of the ropes of her trapeze swing and she falls to the ground, seriously injured, but still alive.

A doctor is summoned. Chan states that Marie is too badly hurt to move, so the doctor must operate on the spot. Chan asks everyone to keep quiet and clear the area, so as not to cause a potentially fatal distraction for the medical staff during the delicate operation.

Meanwhile, Chan has noticed a newspaper article about a crime committed at a casino on the day of Kinney's alleged marriage. He sends his son to a phone for a description of the crooks involved by the police. When Lee returns, he sees a man slug the policeman guarding the gorilla's cage and letting the ape out again. He struggles with the man but is knocked out.

The gorilla reaches the tent where the operation is in progress and tries to cause trouble. The operation is a fake, as is the gorilla. He is shot to death by policemen masquerading as doctors. It is revealed to be snake charmer Tom Holt in a costume, trying to pin a second death on the escaped animal. He and Kinney had robbed the casino and hidden out at the circus. However, they had a falling out over the division of the money, leading to Kinney's murder. Nellie Farrell and her brother Dan are also arrested for trying to use a forgery to gain half interest in the circus. Charlie Chan agrees to obtain a lifetime pass to the circus for his family. He sees Lee Chan and Su Toy having some romance together wondering if any future grandchildren will be able to see the circus, too.

== Cast ==
- Warner Oland as Charlie Chan
- Keye Luke as Charlie's Number One Son, Lee Chan
- George Brasno as Colonel Tim, a midget performer at the circus
- Olive Brasno as Lady Tiny, Colonel Tim's midget wife
- Francis Ford as John Gaines, half-owner of the circus
- Maxine Reiner as Marie Norman, an aerialist and fiancée of Joe Kinney
- John McGuire as Hal Blake
- Shirley Deane as Louise Norman, Marie's sister
- Paul Stanton as Joe Kinney, the other half owner
- J. Carrol Naish as Tom Holt
- Booth Howard as Dan Farrell
- Drue Leyton as Nellie Farrell
- Wade Boteler as Lieutenant Macy
- Shia Jung as Su Toy, a contortionist (love interest to Lee Chan)

== Reception ==
Writing for The Spectator in 1936, Graham Greene gave the film a good review claiming that "Charlie Chan […] needs no recommendation". Greene noted that as yet the Charlie Chan films had been "always well made and well acted", and that "the new picture is particularly agreeable" due to the audience's introduction to Chan's complete family.

In his review of the film in The New York Times, critic Frank Nugent reported that it "pays some attention to the elements of plot structure, and relatively little to pseudo-Confucian maxims, though not little enough, perhaps," that "there are several shots full of the magic of a circus train at night," but "in the final analysis [...] any Chan picture is bound to be an essentially hack job at this late date."
