= The Lucky Corner =

1936 American short film by Gus Meins

- Directed by: Gus Meins
- Produced by: Hal Roach
- Starring: George McFarland; Carl Switzer; Billie Thomas; Leonard Kibrick; Scotty Beckett
- Cinematography: Hap Depew
- Edited by: Louis McManus
- Music by: Marvin Hatley
- Distributed by: MGM
- Release date: March 14, 1936
- Running time: 15' 55"
- Country: United States
- Language: English

The Lucky Corner is a 1936 Our Gang short comedy film directed by Gus Meins. It was the 143rd Our Gang short to be released.

== Plot ==
Scotty and his grandfather Gus are the proprietors of a sidewalk lemonade stand. The small operation struggles to compete with the ornate sidewalk diner run by Leonard's father. Leonard is too engrossed in his comic book to pay attention to waiting customers, and when they leave he whines to his father, who gets a policeman to force Gus and Scotty from their corner. Buckwheat's father, a boot black, offers Gus room to set up his stand, while Spanky, Alfalfa, and the other kids stage a parade and an impromptu talent show to draw customers to Gus's booth.

After some misadventures with Buckwheat (who cannot read) putting starch instead of sugar in the lemonade (Leonard does not know this when he steals the lemonade; the customers spit it out and call the same policeman), Gus and Scotty's business starts to thrive. Then Leonard comes over to belabor the gang for "doping" the lemonade, just before Spanky slips an electric scalp-massager into Leonard's pants. Spanky then connects and disconnects the plug, starting and stopping the device and causing Leonard to writhe around in front of a gathering crowd in a weird snake dance, while Spanky's band plays "Stars and Stripes Forever".

== Notes ==
- A sequel to For Pete's Sake! (which also featured William Wagner and Leonard Kibrick as a father/son villain team), The Lucky Corner was filmed and completed in mid-1935. However, the short was withheld from release until March 1936, by which time Scotty Beckett, one of the principal Our Gang kids in the short, had departed the series.
- In 1971, King World, who distributed the Our Gang shorts to television as The Little Rascals, edited parts of The Lucky Corner with content it deemed to be possibly racially insensitive or offensive. These edits were later reinstated when The Little Rascals aired on the AMC cable TV network between 2001 and 2003.

== Cast ==
=== The Gang ===
- Scotty Beckett as Scotty
- George McFarland as Spanky
- Carl Switzer as Alfalfa
- Billie Thomas as Buckwheat
- Gloria Brown as Gloria
- Alvin Buckelew as Alvin
- Marianne Edwards as Marianne
- Harold Switzer as Harold
- Billy Minderhout as Our Gang member
- Donald Proffitt as Our Gang member
- Merrill Strong as Our Gang member
- Pete the Pup as himself

=== Additional cast ===
- Leonard Kibrick as Leonard
- Ernie Alexander as First customer
- Joe Bordeaux as Painter
- Bobby Dunn as Customer accused of 'poisoning' officer
- Gus Leonard as Gus, Scotty's Grandpa
- Charles Lloyd as Barber
- Joe Mathey as Buckwheat's father
- James C. Morton as Officer
- Art Rowlands as Customer who screams
- William Wagner as Leonard's father
- John Collum as Crowd extra
- Bunny Brownson as Crowd extra
- Lester Dorr as Crowd extra
- Jack Hill as Crowd extra
- Fred Holmes as Crowd extra
- Jack Lipson as Crowd extra
- Sam Lufkin as Crowd extra
- Priscilla Lyon as Undetermined role
- Tommy McFarland as Undetermined role
- Snooky Valentine as Undetermined role

== See also ==
- Our Gang filmography
