= Cousin Wilbur =

- Directed by: George Sidney
- Written by: Hal Law; Robert A. McGowan
- Produced by: Jack Chertok for MGM
- Starring: Carl Switzer; George McFarland; Darla Hood; Scotty Beckett; Billie Thomas; Eugene Lee; Tommy Bond; Sidney Kibrick
- Cinematography: Jackson Rose
- Edited by: Roy Brickner
- Distributed by: MGM
- Release date: 29 April 1939
- Running time: 10:24
- Country: United States
- Language: English

Cousin Wilbur is a 1939 Our Gang short comedy film directed by George Sidney. It was the 179th Our Gang short to be released.

== Plot ==
Despite his initial reluctance, Alfalfa invites his cousin Wilbur to join the All 4 One Club. Wilbur quickly boosts membership by offering cash compensation (usually a penny or two) for every black eye and bruised nose inflicted by Butch and Woim. When two tough guys attempt to intimidate the club, Wilbur surprises everyone by proving himself to be the best bare-knuckle fighter in the neighborhood.

== Notes ==
This episode marked the return of Scotty Beckett, who was Spanky's sidekick from 1934 to 1935. Alfalfa, who joined the gang several months before Beckett left, replaced him at the end of that year. Beckett now returned as Alfalfa's nerdy cousin, replete the horn-rimmed glasses.

== Cast ==
=== The Gang ===
- Scotty Beckett as Cousin Wilbur
- Eugene Lee as Porky
- Darla Hood as Darla
- George McFarland as Spanky
- Carl Switzer as Alfalfa
- Billie Thomas as Buckwheat

=== Additional cast ===
- Tommy Bond as Butch
- Sidney Kibrick as Woim
- Leonard Landy as Leonard
- Gary Jasgur as Slapsie
- Joe Geil as Kid with a black eye
- Philip Hurlic as Buckwheat's friend
- Mary Currier as Alfalfa's mother
- Freddie Chapman as Club member
- Payne Johnson as Club member
- Darwood Kaye as Club member
- Joe Levine as Club member
- Tommy McFarland as Club member
- Harold Switzer as Club member

== See also ==
- Our Gang filmography
