= Eva Lee Kuney =

American child actress, dancer, and draftswoman

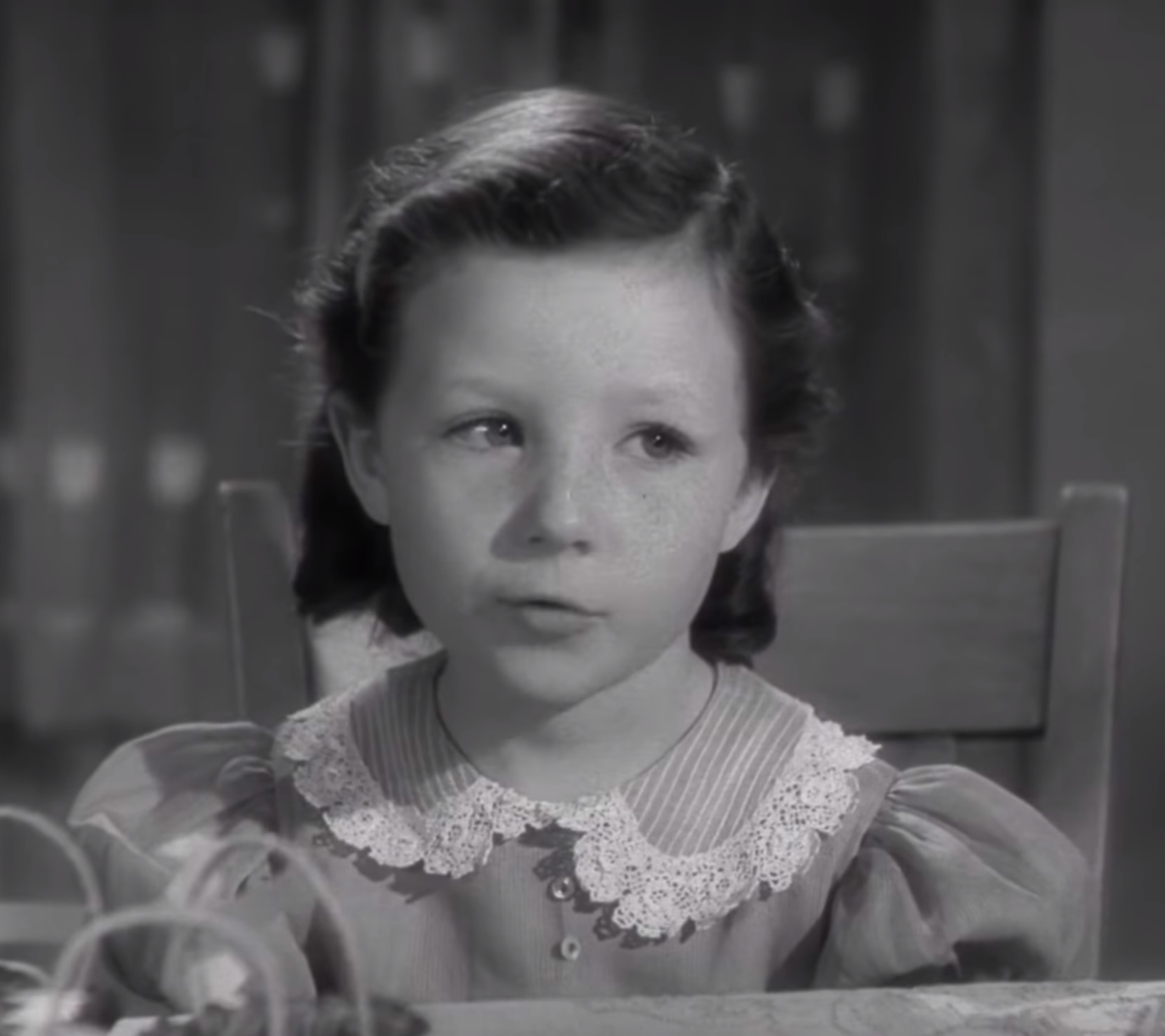
- Kuney in Penny Serenade
- Born: April 24, 1934; Hollywood, California, U.S.
- Died: May 24, 2015 (aged 81); Las Vegas, Nevada, U.S.
- Other names: Eva Feldman; Lee Feldman
- Occupations: Actress; dancer; draftswoman
- Years active: 1935–1954
- Spouses: Arthur "Buddy" Grover (m. 1955-19??); 2 children; Kenneth Feldman (m. 1972)

Eva Lee Kuney Grover Feldman (April 24, 1934 – May 24, 2015) was an American child actress, dancer, and draftswoman. She appeared in her first film at the age of 18 months and performed in numerous uncredited film roles.

Kuney's best known role and only screen credit was as six-year-old Trina, the adopted daughter of Cary Grant's and Irene Dunne's characters in Penny Serenade (1941). Turning to dance, Kuney worked as a contract player for film studios until the age of 18, when she accepted a temporary job in a stage show in Las Vegas and continued performing there. Kuney later worked as a draftswoman for the Clark County Transportation Department and volunteered her services to many community theater groups in the city.

== Career ==
Eva Lee Kuney, known as "Lee", was born on April 24, 1934, in Hollywood, California, to parents Leon and Edna Kuney. Her father worked in the Hollywood film industry. At the age of 18 months she appeared in her first film, Little Papa, one of the Our Gang comedies, act when she was 18 months old as Spanky's baby sister. She was one of about a dozen small children used to fill out the background of Munchkin scenes in The Wizard of Oz (1939), as there were not enough little people to populate the set.

In 1940, after a two-year drought with no film roles, Kuney's mother saw a casting notice for the role of the six-year-old girl in Penny Serenade. Kuney was selected over 500 other applicants. She received her first screen credit playing Trina in the film. In 1942, she appeared as herself in a comedy play titled "Camera Angles", which featured many young Hollywood actors and actresses playing themselves in a benefit performance for the Anne Lehr Milk Fund.

Turning to dance, Kuney became a contract player for film studios; among her performances were the films Holiday Inn (1942) and White Christmas (1954).

Kuney graduated from North Hollywood High School. At age 18 she accepted a dancing job in San Francisco from choreographer Donn Arden, who then offered her a temporary gig in his new stage show at the Desert Inn in Las Vegas. She went on to dance in Las Vegas stage shows starring Dean Martin, Frank Sinatra, and Patti Page.

After retiring from the stage, Kuney worked as a draftswoman for the Clark County Transportation Department. She later volunteered her time and advice to many community theater groups in Las Vegas.

== Personal life and death ==
Kuney married her first husband, Arthur "Buddy" Grover, a musician, in 1955. The couple had a son and daughter, Brad and Andrea. In 1972, Kuney married Kenneth Feldman, a speech pathologist who later was active as a community theater actor and director in Las Vegas.

Eva Kuney Feldman died in Las Vegas on May 24, 2015, at the age of 81.

== Filmography ==
Year	Title	Role	Notes
1935	Little Papa	Marvel	Uncredited
1938	The Sisters		Uncredited
1938	Five of a Kind		Uncredited
1939	The Wizard of Oz	Background extra in Munchkin scenes	Uncredited
1941	Penny Serenade	Trina (age 6)	
1941	Lydia	Little Blind Girl	Uncredited
1944	Hi, Beautiful	Girl	Uncredited
1945	A Tree Grows in Brooklyn	Girl	Uncredited
1947	Driftwood	A child of McDougal	Uncredited
1948	So Dear to My Heart	Honey Girl	Uncredited
