= Honky Donkey =

1934 film

- Title screen
- Directed by: Gus Meins
- Produced by: Hal Roach
- Starring: Wally Albright; George McFarland; Tommy Bond; Scotty Beckett; Matthew Beard
- Cinematography: Francis Corby
- Edited by: Bert Jordan
- Music by: Leroy Shield
- Distributed by: MGM
- Release date: June 2, 1934
- Running time: 16 minutes
- Country: United States
- Language: English

Honky Donkey is a 1934 Our Gang short comedy film directed by Gus Meins. It was the 129th Our Gang short to be released. It was partially filmed at the Culver Hotel.

== Plot ==
A pampered rich boy named Wally is shown getting spoiled by his overprotective mother. His mom takes him to a doctor, wrapping him in blankets. The mother goes off to do shopping. The mother tells Wally to go directly home with no stopping to play. Barclay is the snobbish/timid chauffeur who drives him. She then warns Barclay giving him the authoritative finger. On the way, Wally tells Barclay to "drive through some alleys... some dirty ones" in an attempt to meet with the gang. He comes across them in an alley on a vacant lot, playing on a makeshift merry-go-round. The device is powered by the gang's pet mule Algebra, who pulls the platform in circles whenever he hears a person sneeze, and stops when he hears a ringing bell like an alarm clock. Wally has been looking for some friends among a group his snobbish mom would look down on.

The kids are soon chased off by the owner, and Wally offers to take the gang to his house so they can play undisturbed. They cajole Barclay into driving back slowly, leading Algebra behind the car on a rope. They attract a fairly large crowd when Algebra, hearing the ringing of a stop sign at a busy intersection, sits down and refuses to get up. Barclay gets in an argument with a traffic cop, until Spanky offers a solution. The children are then crammed into the front seat while Algebra sits in the back.

When the gang arrives at Wally's house, they play in the yard, leaving Barclay to get Algebra out of the car. He winds up getting knocked unconscious when Algebra kicks him in the head, and Wally's housekeeper comes out of the house and screams in horror at the sight of the mule sitting in their car. Barclay then sneezes, leading Algebra to chase him into the house and begin tearing things up inside. Sneezes and ringing bells ensue. Wally's mother comes home unawares. She sees the gang running around and her household staff in disarray. Wally's mom sneezes and Algebra starts to chase her. She is surprised that none of her staff are coming to help her. She starts to run away with Algebra in pursuit. The mother slides down the bannister. Her staff try to rescue her. They open the front door, but the mother sneezes and the animal is after her. Wally's mother makes a wild dash across her large lawn and jumps into the fountain. Algebra lets out a loud, wild and long laugh. (The laugh is that of Mickey Daniels, a former rascal.)

== Cast ==
=== The Gang ===
- Wally Albright as Wallace
- Matthew Beard as Stymie
- Scotty Beckett as Scotty
- Tommy Bond as Tommy
- George McFarland as Spanky
- Willie Mae Taylor as Buckwheat
- Philbrook Lyons as Our Gang member

=== Additional cast ===
- Don Barclay as Barclay
- Mickey Daniels as Algebra the Mule's Laugh (voice)
- Bess Flowers as Maid
- Pete Gordon as Bicycle Rider
- Julia Griffith as Household servant
- Charles McAvoy as Officer
- William Wagner as Realtor

== See also ==
- Our Gang filmography
