= The Mighty Barnum =

1934 film by Walter Lang

- Directed by: Walter Lang
- Written by: Gene Fowler; Bess Meredyth; John Huston (uncredited)
- Produced by: Darryl F. Zanuck
- Starring: Wallace Beery; Adolphe Menjou; Virginia Bruce; Rochelle Hudson
- Cinematography: J. Peverell Marley
- Edited by: Barbara McLean
- Music by: Alfred Newman
- Production company: Twentieth Century Pictures
- Distributed by: United Artists
- Release date: December 23, 1934
- Running time: 85 minutes
- Country: United States
- Language: English

The Mighty Barnum is a 1934 film, directed by Walter Land and starring Wallace Beery,is a highly fictionalized biography of the American showman P.T. Barnum. The movie was written by Gene Fowler and Bess Meredyth. The supporting cast features Adolphe Menjou, Virginia Bruce as Jenny Lind, and Rochelle Hudson.

Beery had played Barnum four years earlier in A Lady's Morals, a biography of singer Jenny Lind.

== Plot ==
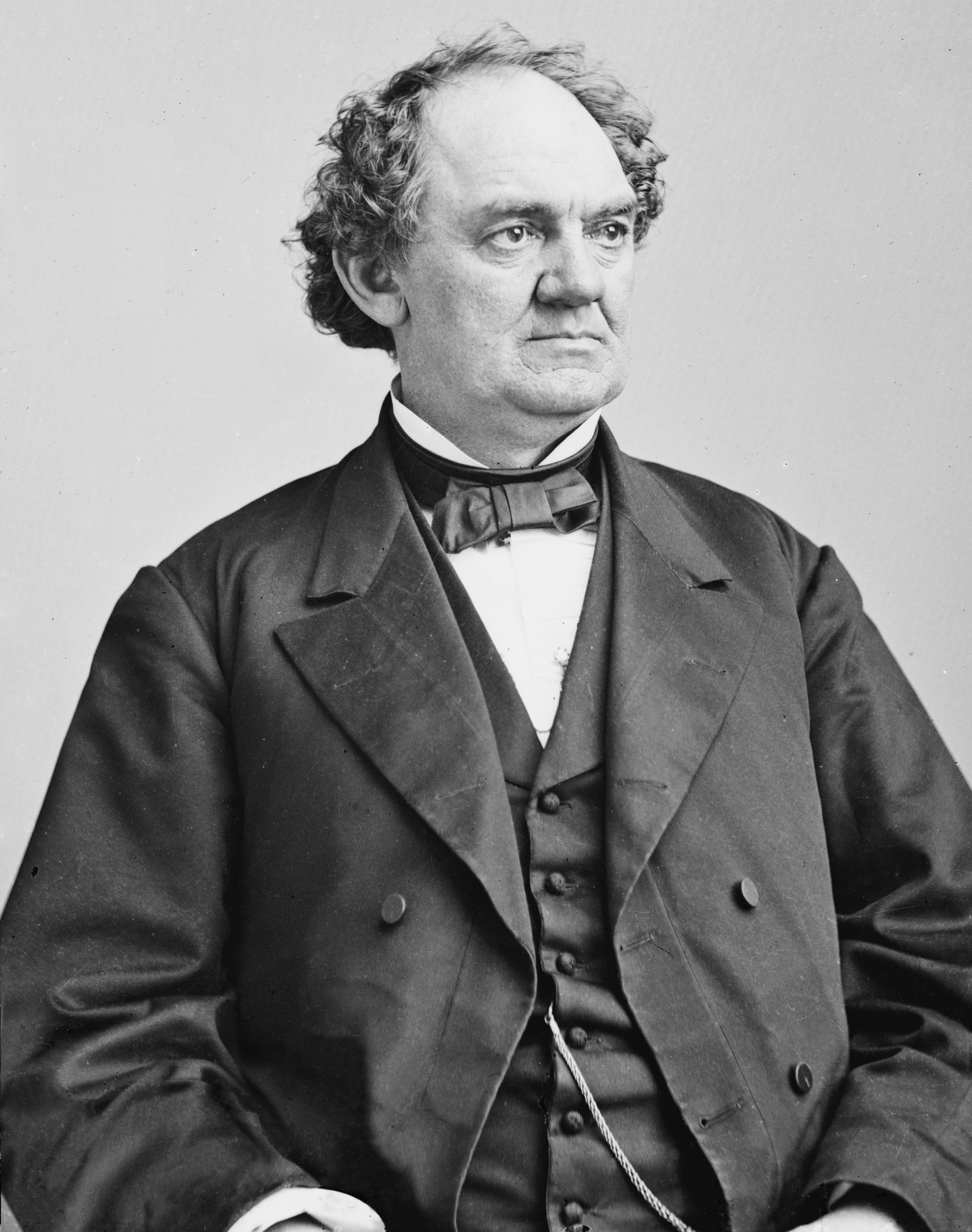
The real P.T. Barnum

Wallace Beery as P.T. Barnum

In 1835, P.T. Barnum is operating a general store in New York City. His passion is the collection of freaks of nature; his collection includes a stuffed two-headed calf and a three-headed frog. He lives with his wife Nancy and a Mr. Walsh, a man with an alcohol abuse problem. Nancy does not like Barnum spending money on oddities, which has left the two of them in debt. She also does not enjoy living with Walsh. Barnum hopes that Walsh will help him establish a museum of oddities once he stops drinking. When the Barnums' young niece Ellie tells Walsh that she loves him, he promises that he will not fall in love with anyone else until she becomes an adult

Nancy finally tells Barnum that they need to give up the store and move back to Connecticut. She gives him money from her father to buy train tickets home. Barnums goes out to buy the tickets. However, he spots Mr. Walsh ordering buttermilk and assumes he is now sober. Excited to finally start the museum, he uses $200 of his wife's money to rent a livery stable to exhibit his collection. Barnum spends the remaining $50 buying the contract of Joice Heth from promoter J. P. Skiff. Heth is an elderly woman posing as the 160-year-old former nursemaid to George Washington. She becomes a living part of the new museum.

Barnum's museum of oddities is an instant success. Seeing the museum's prosperity, Skiff attempts to blackmail Barnum by revealing Heth's true again. Skiff demands $1,000, but Barnum throws him out. Skiff then goes to the newspapers, who expose the Heth fraud Barnum then hires Madame Zorro, the original bearded lady, to join the museum, reviving public interest. Publisher Horace Greeley New-York Tribune calls Madame Zorro another hoax, although she is actually genuine. He publicly bets Barnum $5,000, the winnings going to charity, that he will prove Madame Zero is not a woman. The plan is for a group of society ladies to perform the determination.

However, Skiff bribes Madame Zorro with $1,000 to stay away from the examination, replacing her with a man with chest hair. When the ladies examine the bearded lady, they are shocked and outraged to discover that she is a man. Indignant at being deceived, a mob destroys Barnum's museum. Nancy gets ready to leave the city again and a despondent Walsh starts drinking again, upsetting Ellie.

At that point, Barnum and Walsh meet a dwarf named Tom Thumb. He needs a job so that he can marry his sweetheart Lavinia, also a dwarf. Tom and Lavinia become the basis of Barnum and Walsh's new road show, prompting Nancy to remain in New York. Over time, Barnum and his show become famous. They tour the United States and then travel to Europe and Great Britain, where Barnum is received by Queen Victoria. At the end of the international tour, Barnum and the show return to the United States. Walsh remains in Europe to buy Jumbo, the world's largest elephant, for their show.

Barnum is disappointed when Walsh returns to the United States without Jumbo. However, has brought back the soprano Jenny Lind, known in Europe as the Swedish Nightingale. When Barnum hears her sing at his show and sees the crowd react, he realizes that Lind is far more valuable than Jumbo. As his show grows in popularity, Barnum becomes more egotistical. Falling in love with Lind, he neglects his museum, his wife Nancy and the "freaks" in the museum. Barnum throws a banquet for Lind, attended by the Swedish consul, the poet Henry Wadsworth Longfellow and the mayor of New York. Barnum insults the Swedish consul by interrupting the Swedish National Anthem. When Barnum innocently toasts Lind with a vulgar Swedish phrase, everyone is offended and leaves the banquet. The next day, Barnum and Walsh get into a heated argument that devolves into a fight. Jenny and Walsh leave the museum and Nancy finally goes home. Barnum goes bankrupt and loses the museum property.

Some time later, Barnum is sitting on a bench near the site of his old museum, Tom Thumb comes up to Barnum and invites him out for dinner. When Barnum arrives at the restaurant, he finds Madame Zorro and the other "freaks" waiting for him. They all agree to work for nothing to get a new museum going. Walsh has also decided to help Barnum, but wants to surprise him. On the night of the museum opening, he hides inside a mummy case in the museum. Nancy also returns to New York for the opening.

As the museum opens, Skiff starts a fire inside it. Barnum then hears Walsh yelling inside the mummy case. The new museum is destroyed. However, Walsh has another surprise for Barnum. To express her gratitude, Lind bought Jumbo for Barnum and Walsh brought the elephant to New York. Walsh tells an adult Ellie that he only loves her.

As Barnum and Walsh lead Jumbo in a parade in New York City, they decide to form a new partnership and create a traveling circus. However, Barnum does not like the sound of "Barnum and Walsh," Learning for the first time that Walsh's first name is Bailey, he christens their endeavor "Barnum and Bailey, the Greatest Show on Earth."

== Cast ==
Adolphe Menjou as Bailey Walsh

- Wallace Beery as P.T. Barnum
- Adolphe Menjou as Bailey Walsh
- Virginia Bruce as Jenny Lind
- Rochelle Hudson as Ellen
- Janet Beecher as Nancy Barnum
- Tammany Young as Todd
- Herman Bing as Farmer Schultz
- Lucille La Verne as Joice Heath
- George Brasno as Tom Thumb
- Olive Brasno as Lavinia Thumb
- May Boley as the Bearded Lady
- John Hyams as J.P. Skiff
- Ian Wolfe as Swedish Consul
- Davison Clark as Horace Greeley
- George MacQuarrie as Daniel Webster
- Charles Judels as Maitre D'Hotel
- Philo McCullough as Publicity Man (uncredited)
- Frank Morgan as Joe (uncredited)
- Frances Raymond as Matron (uncredited)
- Matty Roubert as Hotel bellhop
