= Martha Cheavens =

American novelist

Martha Cheavens (1899–1975) was an American novelist, short-story writer and poet, several of whose works were adapted for the screen.

== Life ==
The oldest child of John Self Cheavens, a Baptist missionary and founder of the National Baptist Convention of Mexico, Martha Louise Cheavens was raised in Mexico and Texas. She graduated in 1922 from the Missouri School of Journalism. She was married to Hugh J. Schuck, a foreign editor for the New York Daily News. They raised a son, Hugh Schuck Junior, and an adopted daughter, Nancy Proudman. The couple lived in Great Neck, New York, Westport, Connecticut, and King of Prussia, Pennsylvania. (New York Times obituary, 28 March 1975)

== Work ==
Martha Cheavens published widely in magazines intended for a female readership, including: "Dream Market," in Women's Home Companion, December, 1936; "A Japanese Carol," The American Magazine, January 1937; "Missouri Rose," Good Housekeeping, July 1939; "Sleep Not My Country," Good Housekeeping, June 1942; "Eighteen to Twenty," McCall's, May, 1943; "For All the Time There Is," McCall's, June, 1945; "The Ringing Stars," Ladies Home Journal, December, 1946.

Her first novel, Spun By an Angel, is a young-adult story set in the Sierra Madre mountains, and based upon the author's own experience.

== Works adapted for the screen ==
Cheavens' best-known works are those made into motion pictures. The first, and most enduringly popular, is Penny Serenade, a 1941 movie starring Cary Grant and Irene Dunne. Loosely adapted from an incident in Cheavens' own life, it tells the story of a newspaperman and his wife whose marriage suffers when their adopted daughter dies.

The less well-known Sunday Dinner for a Soldier (1944) is "a warm, sentimental little tale about an impoverished, parentless brood who have their hearts set on entertaining a service man." (New York Times review, 25 January 1945)

A third story, "The Ringing Stars," was optioned by Hollywood, but apparently never produced. It concerns a Navy chaplain who loses his faith during the war, but rediscovers it while serving his flock at home in Texas. (Although not necessarily the inspiration for this story, Cheavens' brother Frank Cheavens served briefly as a Baptist minister in Texas before becoming a psychologist). The script was retitled twice, as Fall on Your Knees and Crosswinds. (New York Times article, 26 January 1947). It was published in hardcover under the latter title in 1948. A reviewer considered it overly sentimental, saying that "Miss Cheavens poses a stark enough dilemma for her hero, but takes care to avoid coming to grips with reality from that point on." (Andrea Parke, New York Times review, 17 October 1948).

== Further research ==
As of February 2007, no works by Martha Cheavens were in print. Used copies of her books are readily available, and magazines containing her work can occasionally be found as well.

Some of Cheavens' personal papers, including a script for Penny Serenade (1941), are preserved in the archives of the University of Missouri in Columbia, Missouri (link below).
