= Little Papa =

- Directed by: Gus Meins
- Produced by: Hal Roach
- Cinematography: Harry Forbes
- Edited by: Louis McManus
- Music by: Leroy Shield
- Distributed by: MGM
- Release date: September 21, 1935
- Running time: 19' 27"
- Country: United States
- Language: English

Little Papa is a 1935 Our Gang short comedy film directed by Gus Meins. It was the 138th Our Gang short to be released.

== Plot ==
Although Spanky would like to play football with the rest of the gang, he is stuck at home taking care of his baby sister. Hoping to lull the kid to sleep, thereby allowing himself to sneak out of the house, Spanky tries all sorts of "sure-fire" beddie-bye methods. But neither he nor his co-conspirator "Alfalfa" are able to coerce the little brat into drifting off to dreamland—though they do briefly fall asleep themselves.

Their efforts briefly succeed but ultimately fail when, in the process of inflating a football, they cause its air sac to burst loudly, waking the baby and ruining all their efforts.

== Cast ==
=== The Gang ===
- Scotty Beckett as Scotty
- George McFarland as Spanky
- Carl Switzer as Alfalfa
- Billie Thomas as Buckwheat
- Alvin Buckelew as Alvin
- Dickie De Nuet as Little Our Gang member
- Sidney Kibrick as Our Gang member
- Donald Proffitt as Our Gang member

=== Additional cast ===
- Patsy May as Baby
- Ruth Hiatt as Mother
- Eva Lee Kuney (uncredited)

== Notes ==
- This short marks the first appearance of Patsy May, who only made 3 other Our Gang appearances after this.

== See also ==
- Our Gang filmography
