= William Wagner (actor) =

American actor

- Born: November 7, 1883; New York City, New York, U.S.
- Died: March 11, 1964 (aged 80); Hollywood, Los Angeles, California, U.S.
- Resting place: Mountain View Cemetery and Mausoleum, Los Angeles County, California
- Years active: 1931-1948

William Wagner (November 7, 1883 – March 11, 1964) was an American character actor. He appeared in over 50 films between 1931 and 1948. During these years, most of times, he had played in small roles such as butlers, anonymous clerks, persnickety store managers, and other such roles. He became famous for The Rustler's Roundup (1933), It Happened One Night (1934), and Rebecca of Sunnybrook Farm (1938)

== Film ==
Born in New York City, New York, Williams is best remembered for his role in the Our Gang films For Pete's Sake! and The Lucky Corner.

== Death ==
Wagner died on March 11, 1964, in Hollywood, California. He was 80 years of age.

== Selected filmography ==
- Rustlers' Roundup (1933)
- Honky Donkey (1934)
- Jane Eyre (1934)
- The Gay Divorcee (1934)
- For Pete's Sake! (1935)
- The Lucky Corner (1936)
- Second Honeymoon (1937)
