= Little Miss Broadway =

1938 film by Irving Cummings

- Theatrical release poster
- Directed by: Irving Cummings
- Written by: Harry Tugend; Jack Yellen
- Produced by: Darryl F. Zanuck; David Hempstead
- Starring: Shirley Temple; Edna May Oliver; George Murphy; Phyllis Brooks
- Cinematography: Arthur C. Miller
- Edited by: Walter A. Thompson
- Music by: Harold Spina; Walter Bullock
- Distributed by: Twentieth Century-Fox Film Corporation
- Release date: July 29, 1938
- Running time: 70 minutes
- Country: United States
- Language: English

Little Miss Broadway is a 1938 American musical drama film directed by Irving Cummings. The screenplay was written by Harry Tugend and Jack Yellen. The film stars Shirley Temple in a story about a theatrical boarding house and its occupants, and was originally titled Little Lady of Broadway. In 2009, the film was available on DVD and videocassette.

== Plot ==
Betsy Brown is released from an orphanage into the care of Pop Shea, her parents' friend who runs a boarding house for theatrical performers. Sarah Wendling, the curmudgeon owner and next-door neighbor of the building, detests "show people" and their noise, and demands Pop pay the $2,500 back rent he owes or move out immediately. Her nephew Roger is in love with Pop's daughter Barbara and files suit against Sarah in order to gain control of the building and his inheritance, with which he plans to stage a show starring the hotel's residents. Sarah questions the soundness of Roger's investment in the show, and Betsy convinces the judge to see the production before he decides the case. With the assistance of her friends, the little girl presents a lavish musical revue in the courtroom that so impresses one of the observers, he offers the troupe $2,500 a week to star in his International Follies. Having had a change of heart, Sarah insists the show is worth $5,000 and convinces the impresario to double his offer. Roger and Barbara then announce their intent to wed and adopt Betsy.

== Cast ==
- Shirley Temple as Betsy Brown, an orphan
- George Murphy as Roger, Sarah's nephew, Betsy's adoptive father
- Jimmy Durante as Jimmy Clayton, a bandleader
- Phyllis Brooks as Barbara, Pop's daughter, Betsy's adoptive mother
- Edward Ellis as Pop Shea, Betsy's parents' friend
- Edna May Oliver as Sarah Wendling
- George Barbier as Fiske
- Jane Darwell as Miss Hutchins
- El Brendel as Ole, an animal trainer
- Donald Meek as Willoughby Wendling, Sarah's brother
- Patricia Wilder as Flossie, Hotel variety Switchboard Operator
- Claude Gillingwater Sr. as The Judge
- George Brasno and Olive Brasno as Themselves
- Charles Williams as Mike Brody
- Charles Coleman as Simmons, Sarah's butler
- Russell Hicks as Perry
- The Brian Sisters as Themselves
- Claire Du Brey as Miss Blodgett
- Robert Gleckler as Detective
- C. Montague Shaw as Miles
- Frank Dae as Pool
- Eddie Collins, Syd Saylor, Jerry Colonna, and Heinie Conklin as Clayton's band members
- Barbra Bell Cross as Carol, an orphan (uncredited)
- Hank Mann as Ventriloquist (uncredited)

== Production ==
Murphy, who was not satisfied with the dance routine in "We Should Be Together," insisted that movie's closing dance number be reworked. Despite Temple's mother's concerns, Temple was on board with it. The dance number proved so popular with the cast and crew that Murphy and Temple gave an encore performance after the cameras stopped rolling.

== Music ==
Six songs were written by Harold Spina (music) and Walter Bullock (lyrics). All were performed by Temple.

- "Little Miss Broadway"
- "Be Optimistic"
- "How Can I Thank You?"
- "We Should Be Together"
- "If All the World Were Paper"
- "Swing Me an Old Fashioned Song"

"Hop, Skip, and Jump", a Temple duet with Jimmy Durante, was cut from the film but is still visible in the original trailer.

Other songs appearing in the movie include:

- "When You Were Sweet Sixteen"
- "Loch Lomond"
- "Auld Lang Syne"

== Release ==
=== Critical reception ===
The New York Times wrote, "The devastating Mistress Temple is slightly less devastating than usual [...] it can't be old age, but it does look like weariness [...] although she performs with her customary gaiety and dimpled charm, there is no mistaking the effort every dimple cost her."

TV Guide called it "a delightful Shirley Temple vehicle in which she again does what she does best – portray a singing, dancing, pouting orphan girl."

== See also ==
- Shirley Temple filmography
