= Rustlers' Roundup =

1933 film by Henry MacRae

- Theatrical release poster
- Directed by: Henry MacRae
- Screenplay by: Frank Howard Clark
- Story by: Ella O'Neill
- Produced by: Stanley Bergerman; Carl Laemmle, Jr.
- Starring: Tom Mix; Diane Sinclair; Noah Beery, Jr. Douglass Dumbrille; Roy Stewart; Nelson McDowell
- Cinematography: Daniel B. Clark
- Edited by: Albert Akst; Russell F. Schoengarth
- Production company: Universal Pictures
- Distributed by: Universal Pictures
- Release date: March 16, 1933
- Running time: 56 minutes
- Country: United States
- Language: English

Rustlers' Roundup is a 1933 American pre-Code Western film directed by Henry MacRae and written by Frank Howard Clark. The film stars Tom Mix, Noah Beery Jr., Douglass Dumbrille, Roy Stewart and Nelson McDowell. The film was released on March 16, 1933, by Universal Pictures.

== Cast ==
- Tom Mix as Tom Lawson
- Diane Sinclair as Mary Brand
- Noah Beery Jr. as Danny Brand
- Douglass Dumbrille as Bill Brett
- Roy Stewart as Dave Winters
- Nelson McDowell as Sheriff Brass
- William Desmond as San Dimas Sheriff Holden
- Frank Lackteen as Henchman Bayhorse
- William Wagner as Lawyer Homer Jones
- Gilbert Holmes as Husky
- Bud Osborne as Henchman Sodden
