= George Brasno =

American actor (1911–82)

- Brasno in Charlie Chan at the Circus, 1936
- Born: December 23, 1915; Old Bridge, New Jersey, US
- Died: August 15, 1982 (aged 70); South River, New Jersey, US
- Resting place: Saint Marys Cemetery, East Brunswick, New Jersey, US
- Other name: George Shaver
- Occupation: Actor
- Years active: 1933–1945

George F. Brasno (December 23, 1915 – August 15, 1982) was an American actor who appeared in a few films through the 1930s and 1940s. He and his sister Olive Brasno were first recognized as a brother and sister little-people singing team in a partnership with Buster Shaver's vaudeville act. He was also billed as George Shaver.

== Career ==
Brasno was the son of Mr. and Mrs. George Brasno, born in the community of Old Bridge, New Jersey, and later resided in South River. Brasno and his sister Olive Brasno started out as a brother and sister dwarf act performing with the Johnny Jones Exposition. Buster Shaver saw them, and they joined his vaudeville act. In 1937, George and Olive Brasno were offered roles in the film The Wizard of Oz (1939) but they declined because they were making more money on the road with their singing act.

Despite turning down the opportunity, they starred in a few movies and shorts between public appearances such as: The Great John L. (1945), Little Miss Broadway (1938), Arbor Day (1936), Charlie Chan at the Circus (1936), Carnival (1935), The Mighty Barnum (1934), Shrimps for a Day (1934), and Sitting Pretty (1933).

For several years, the pair was joined by brother Richard to form an entertainment trio.

Billed as George Shaver, Brasno appeared on Broadway as part of the family trio in Are You With It? (1945).

== Death ==
George Brasno died in South River, New Jersey on August 15, 1982. He was 70 years old.

== Filmography ==
=== Film ===
Year	Title	Role	Notes
1933	Sitting Pretty	A Neighbor	Uncredited
1934	Shrimps for a Day	Dick as a child	Short Film
1934	The Mighty Barnum	Gen. Tom Thumb	
1934	Vaudeville	George - Small Singer	Short Film; credited as Olive & George
1935	Carnival	Midget	Uncredited
1936	Charlie Chan at the Circus	Tim	
1936	Arbor Day	Boy Midget	Short Film
1938	Little Miss Broadway	Self	Credited as George
1945	The Great John L.	Tom Thumb	Uncredited
