= Dog Daze (1939 film) =

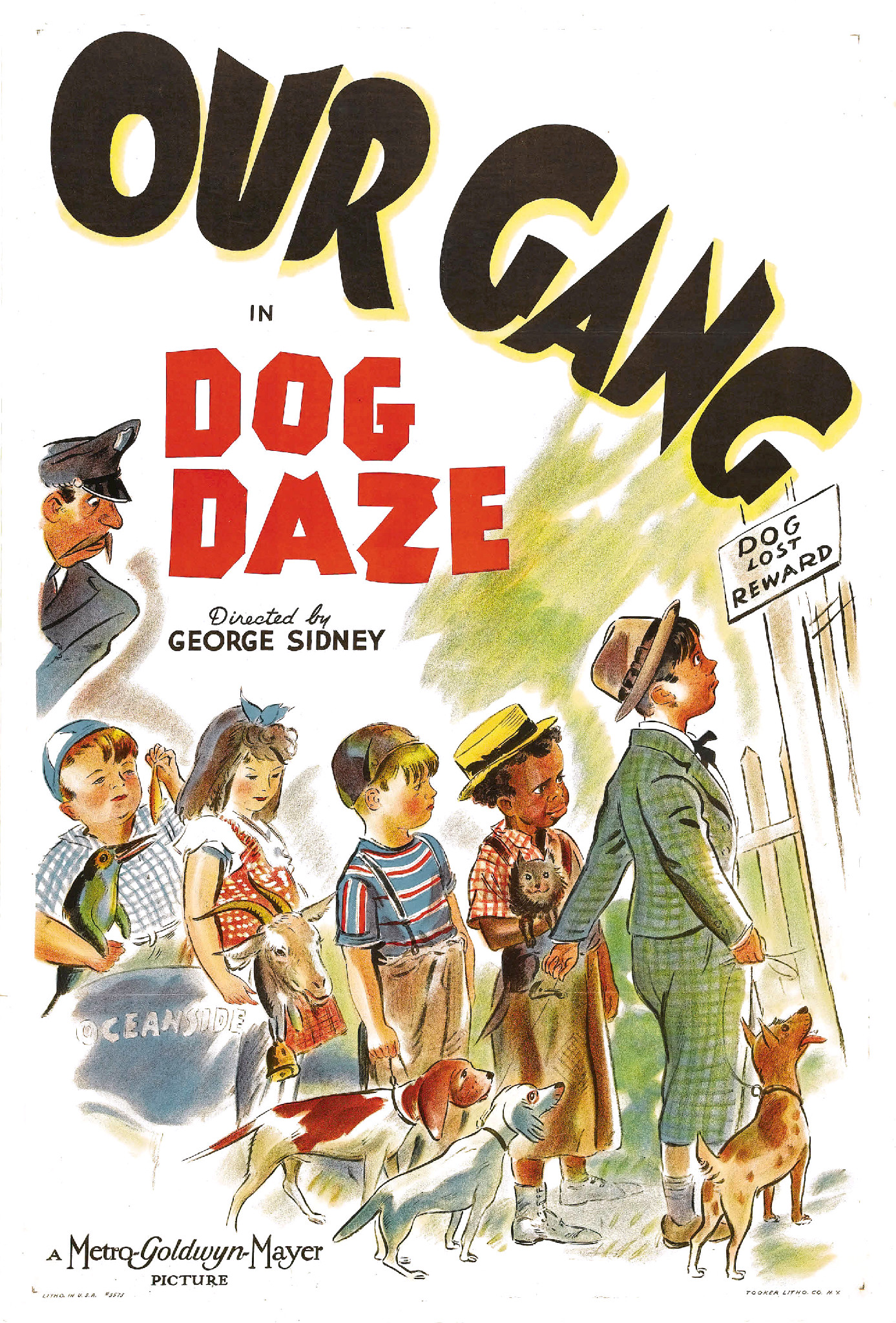
- Directed by: George Sidney
- Written by: Alfred Giebler
- Produced by: MGM
- Starring: Darla Hood; Eugene Lee; George McFarland
- Cinematography: Harold Marzorati
- Edited by: Tom Biggart
- Distributed by: MGM
- Release date: 1 July 1939
- Running time: 10' 34"
- Country: United States
- Language: English

Dog Daze is a 1939 Our Gang short comedy film directed by George Sidney. It was the 181st Our Gang short to be released.

== Plot ==
The gang must raise 37 cents to pay off Butch. They earn a dollar for taking care of an injured dog, which turns out to be a police station mascot. But a goat devours the dollar bill. The kids hit upon a sure-fire moneymaking scheme; they will "rescue" every dog in town, thereby collecting a dollar from each grateful owner. Naturally, the pet owners are upset when their pooches mysteriously disappear, and before long the gang is in hot water with the cops.

Also in the mix is the trained penguin belonging to a frantic vaudevillian. Porky releases the penguin, hoping the dogs will chase it up the block and away from them. However, the police notice the chase and bring the animals back. Nonetheless, the police reward The Gang with a new soap box racer. As soon as the kids start downhill, the dogs take off after them, bowling over their owners. The last shot is of the penguin walking directly into the camera lens.

== Cast ==
- Darla Hood as Darla
- Eugene Lee as Porky
- George McFarland as Spanky
- Carl Switzer as Alfalfa
- Billie Thomas as Buckwheat
- Scotty Beckett as Wilbur

=== Additional cast ===
- Tommy Bond as Butch
- Sidney Kibrick as Woim
- Wade Boteler as Precinct Officer Riley
- Lee Phelps as Officer Sweeney
- John Power as Captain Pindle

== See also ==
- Our Gang filmography
