= Beginner's Luck (1935 film) =

1935 American short film by Gus Meins

- Directed by: Gus Meins
- Produced by: Hal Roach
- Cinematography: Art Lloyd
- Edited by: Louis McManus
- Music by: Marvin Hatley
- Distributed by: MGM
- Release date: February 23, 1935
- Running time: 18:24
- Country: United States
- Language: English

Beginner's Luck is a 1935 Our Gang short comedy film directed by Gus Meins. It was the 135th Our Gang short to be released. It was also the first short for seven-year-old Carl "Alfalfa" Switzer and his ten-year-old brother Harold Switzer to appear.

== Plot ==
Spanky has been entered into an amateur show by his overly aggressive stage mother. He wants nothing to do with this and would rather not act. The gang comes up with a plan to disrupt his recitation and make him flop which makes Spanky very pleased.

At the theater, the mother infuriates the MC saying 'My son is too much of an artist to open a show". After the first act, as the mother is putting on his costume the MC asks if he's ready which he isn't and the MC decides to have him go on last.With every performance by children, the gang in the audience lets out a cheer, which angers the pianist ahead of them.

Spanky befriends a girl called Daisy who has bombed her act but needs the prize money to buy a special dress. Spanky has a change of heart and decides to win the prize. He asks permission from his mom. She says "All I want is that you are a hit". He promises Daisy, "Girlie, the dress is in the bag". Now he has to tell the gang. His mom won't let him go into the audience as he's about to go on. Instead, she volunteers to speak to the boys. She has no idea there is a plot and just gives them a pep talk about rooting for Spanky. The gang decide to ignore her and prepare themselves.

Spanky steps out on the stage clad in a Roman Centurion costume, reciting William Shakespeare's Julius Caesar. The gang erupts with noisemakers and peashooters. Spanky stoically performing his act with him having an amusing slow burn annoyance while enduring his friends embarrassing him surprisingly makes his act the hit of the show, with everyone laughing and loving it except his Mother.

Spanky tries to shut his visor on his helmet but it gets stuck shut he starts to roam around the stage like a Chinese dragon. The mother begs that he be taken off, but he is too much of a hit. She tries to run on the stage but the MC grabs her. The mother then goes behind the curtain with a stage pole to pull her son off. She felt she had to rescue him from this cruel, mean audience. She tries to put an end to the audience's enjoyment of laughing at her son. She moves the pole out trying to catch Spanky, only to insert the pole into an electrical outlet. This shocks her, she drops the pole and is knocked back to be sitting on her heels. She has accidentally opened the curtain grommet which holds the curtain halves together. She is kneeling there wringing the shock out of her hands.Daisy asked the MC to give Spanky another chance. He tells her that Spanky has already won the prize money, much to Daisy's delight.

The mother hooks Spanky and starts to pull him back, he is fighting her and she is being pulled out on the stage a little. It takes a little time but she has him close and it's only a few more minutes and she will have him. The grandmother sees the grommet hook dangling between the mother's legs in between her dress hem and shoes. The Old lady sees her chance to give a comeuppance to Spanky's mom. She turns to the MC saying "Here's where we stop the show". The MC says "GO AHEAD" knowing the audience is going to love this. The curtain raises and the hook fits right into the mother's hem, where it's impossible to remove. It worked so well the mother doesn't even know her dress has been snagged. Then the mother feels it and realizes her predicament. Spanky's mom lets out a screech. The mother is now the one who is being humiliated on stage as the curtain goes higher her dress goes up with the audience howling its approval. The dress is yanked off her and runs up on the curtain. The mother is thrown down to kneeling on the stage in her slip, she goes into shock and becomes petrified her head is back, mouth wide open and eyes looking straight up, she seems hypnotized by her dress dangling on the curtain. Spanky rushes to hide her from being ogled and places a stage prop in front of her, once this is in place he hears a wild increase in the laughter, the prop has a caricature of a squatting dog's body on it with the mother's head perched on top. Spanky looks at his mom, she looks so humiliated his eyes bulge and his helmet top starts to spin wildly. The audience is near a riotous level of howling at her. Spanky's mother's rescue has been a fiasco with her being made a spectacle of on the stage.

== Cast ==
=== The Gang ===
- George McFarland as Spanky
- Matthew Beard as Stymie
- Scotty Beckett as Scotty
- Billie Thomas as Buckwheat
- Alvin Buckelew as Alvin
- Jerry Tucker as Jerry
- Eileen Bernstein as Our Gang member
- Sidney Kibrick as Our Gang member
- Cecilia Murray as Our Gang member
- Donald Profitt as Our Gang member
- Merrill Strong as Our Gang member
- Pete the Pup as himself

=== Additional cast ===
- Marianne Edwards as Daisy Dimple
- Laura June Kenny as Floradora Dolly
- The Cabin Kids as Themselves
- Bonnie Lynn as Little girl singing
- The Meglin Kiddies as the Floradora Dollies
- Carl Switzer as Tom (Arizona Nightingale's)
- Harold Switzer as Jerry (Arizona Nightingale's)
- Freddie Walburn as Kid with the harmonica
- Jackie White as Tapdancer
- Bess Flowers as Friend of Spanky's mother
- Charlie Hall as Stage hand
- Tom Herbert as Master of Ceremonies
- Ruth Hiatt as Daisy's mother
- Kitty Kelly as Spanky's mother
- James C. Morton as Piano player
- May Wallace as Spanky's grandmother
- Ernie Alexander as Audience member
- Fred Holmes as Audience member
- Jack Lipson as Audience member
- Tommy McFarland as Audience member
- Robert McKenzie as Audience member
- Snooky Valentine as Undetermined role

== See also ==
- Our Gang filmography
