= Allez Oop =

1934 film

- Film poster
- Directed by: Buster Keaton; Charles Lamont
- Written by: Ewart Adamson; Ernest Pagano
- Produced by: E. H. Allen; E. W. Hammons
- Starring: Buster Keaton
- Cinematography: Dwight Warren
- Production company: Educational Pictures
- Distributed by: Fox
- Release date: May 25, 1934
- Running time: 21 minutes
- Country: United States
- Language: English

Allez Oop is a 1934 American short comedy film starring Buster Keaton. It was the second film Keaton made for Educational Pictures.

== Plot ==
Elmer (Buster Keaton) works at a clock repair shop and falls for a woman named Paula (Dorothy Sebastian), a customer who brings in her watch to be fixed. Eventually, Elmer invites Paula to go to the circus with him, where she soon becomes enamored with the lead trapeze artist (George J. Lewis). In an effort to win her heart, Elmer attempts to become an expert in acrobatics as well by practicing in his backyard with a swing and mattress, but with very little success. In the end, though, he is able to show his true mettle, performing amazing athletic feats in order to save Paula from a deadly fire.

== Cast ==
- Buster Keaton as Elmer
- Dorothy Sebastian as Paula Stevens
- George J. Lewis as The Great Apollo
- Harry Myers as Circus spectator
- The Flying Escalantes as Acrobatic Troupe
- Leonard Kibrick as Boy watching Buster (uncredited)

== In popular culture ==
- The scene where Elmer rescues Paula from the fire was featured on Sesame Street, teaching the concept of "help." The segment was narrated by Anne Meara.

== See also ==
- List of American films of 1934
- Buster Keaton filmography
