= For Pete's Sake! =

- Directed by: Gus Meins
- Produced by: Hal Roach
- Starring: George McFarland; Scotty Beckett; Tommy Bond; Wally Albright; Matthew Beard; Pete the Pup
- Cinematography: Francis Corby
- Edited by: Ray Snyder
- Music by: Marvin Hatley; Leroy Shield
- Distributed by: Metro-Goldwyn-Mayer
- Release date: April 14, 1934
- Running time: 17' 50"
- Country: United States
- Language: English

For Pete's Sake! is a 1934 Our Gang short comedy film directed by Gus Meins. It was the 127th Our Gang short to be released.

== Plot ==
After Wally fills little Marianne's favorite doll with sawdust and gives it to her, neighborhood bully Leonard lassos it with a rope and swings it out in the street, where a passing truck crushes it. The gang then promises to purchase a new doll for the brokenhearted girl, as her big sister Jane comforts her.

Unfortunately, the kids have no money; but it doesn't dampen their spirits. They window shop for a doll at the local toy store, where Leonard's equally obnoxious father, who coincidentally owns the store, agrees to give the kids a doll if they will trade their beloved Pete the Pup for it. Balking at this proposition, the kids concoct a variety of moneymaking schemes, all of them doomed to failure. Tearfully, the gang surrenders and trades Pete for the doll. Pete does major damage to the store seconds later, and Leonard's father grabs the doll back, claiming compensation for damage to his store. But Pete's continued destruction convinces him to give the doll and the dog back to the gang. They then take the doll to a happy Marianne.

== Cast ==
=== The Gang ===
- Wally Albright as Wally
- Matthew Beard as Stymie
- Scotty Beckett as Scotty
- Tommy Bond as Tommy
- George McFarland as Spanky
- Carlena Beard as Stymie's sister
- Marianne Edwards as Marianne
- Jacqueline Taylor as Jane
- Edmund Corthell as Our Gang member
- Barbara Goodrich as Our Gang member
- Philbrook Lyons as Our Gang member
- Billie Thomas, uncredited, as an unnamed Our Gang member
- Pete the Pup as himself

=== Additional cast ===
- Leonard Kibrick as Leonard
- Fred Holmes as Fred
- Lyle Tayo as Fred's Wife
- William Wagner as Storekeeper

== See also ==
- Our Gang filmography
