= Leonard Kibrick =

American child actor (1924–1993)

- Born: September 6, 1924; Minneapolis, Minnesota, U.S.
- Died: January 4, 1993 (aged 68); Rancho Mirage, California, U.S.
- Resting place: Desert Memorial Park
- Occupation: child actor
- Years active: 1933–1990
- Relatives: Sidney Kibrick (brother)

Leonard Kibrick (September 6, 1924 – January 4, 1993) was an American child actor.

== Career ==
Kibrick was most notable for appearing in the Our Gang short subjects series from 1934 to 1936, usually portraying the villain. Kibrick first appeared in the 1934 Our Gang short For Pete's Sake. He appeared in many more Our Gang shorts for the next two years. His final Our Gang short was the 1936 The Lucky Corner. His role as the bully in the series was taken over by Tommy Bond (as "Butch") in 1937, and Leonard's younger brother Sidney Kibrick portrayed Butch's sidekick, "The Woim".

== Death ==
A native of Minneapolis, Minnesota, Kibrick died of cancer on January 4, 1993.

== Filmography ==
Film
Year	Title	Role	Notes
1933	The Bowery	Older boy on the pier	Uncredited
1933	Man's Castle	Baseball Team's Catcher	Uncredited
1933	Lone Cowboy	Irving	Uncredited
1933	The Mystery Squadron	Boy with Bag of Jellybeans	Serial, [Ch. 1], Uncredited
1934	For Pete's Sake!	Leonard	Short
1934	Mike Fright	Leonard	Short
1934	Allez Oop	Little Boy watching Buster	uncredited
1934	I'll Fix It	Boy	Uncredited
1934	Kid Millions	Lenny	Uncredited
1934	Flirting with Danger	Little Bill	Uncredited
1935	Life Returns	Boy in Clubhouse	Uncredited
1935	Under Pressure	Minor Role	Uncredited
1935	Two-Fisted	Boy Outside Boxing Ring	Uncredited
1935	Ah, Wilderness!	Boy with Firecrackers	Uncredited
1936	Little Lord Fauntleroy	Fighting Boy	Uncredited
1936	The Lucky Corner	Leonard	Short
1936	Poor Little Rich Girl	Freckles	Uncredited
1936	San Francisco	Choirboy	Uncredited
1936	Kelly the Second	Newsboy	Uncredited
1936	Dimples	Children's Band Member #1	
1936	Conflict	Boy	Uncredited
1937	The Great O'Malley	Newsboy	Uncredited
1937	Two Wise Maids	Minor Role	Uncredited
1937	Love Is News	Newsboy	Uncredited
1937	Michael O'Halloran	Benny Levinsky	Uncredited
1937	Dangerous Holiday	Butch, the Bully	Uncredited
1937	It Could Happen to You	Boy	Uncredited
1937	One Mile from Heaven	Butch	Uncredited
1937	Nothing Sacred	Older Red-Headed Boy Chorister	Uncredited
1938	Love Is a Headache	Mike's Friend	Uncredited
1938	The Goldwyn Follies	Violinist at Radio Station	Uncredited
1938	A Slight Case of Murder	Orphan	Uncredited
1938	Five of a Kind	Newsboy	Uncredited
1938	Just Around the Corner	Gang Member	Uncredited
1938	Peck's Bad Boy with the Circus	One of Bill's Friends	Uncredited
1939	Jesse James	Boy	Uncredited
1939	Fisherman's Wharf	Gang Member - Accordion Player	Uncredited
1939	Rose of Washington Square	Newsboy	Uncredited
1939	It's a Wonderful World	Herman Plotka	
1939	She Married a Cop		
1940	He Married His Wife	Messenger Boy	Uncredited
1942	Roxie Hart	Newsboy	Uncredited
1942	It Happened in Flatbush	Kid Running Down Sidewalk	Uncredited
