= Jackie Lynn Taylor =

American actress (1925–2014)

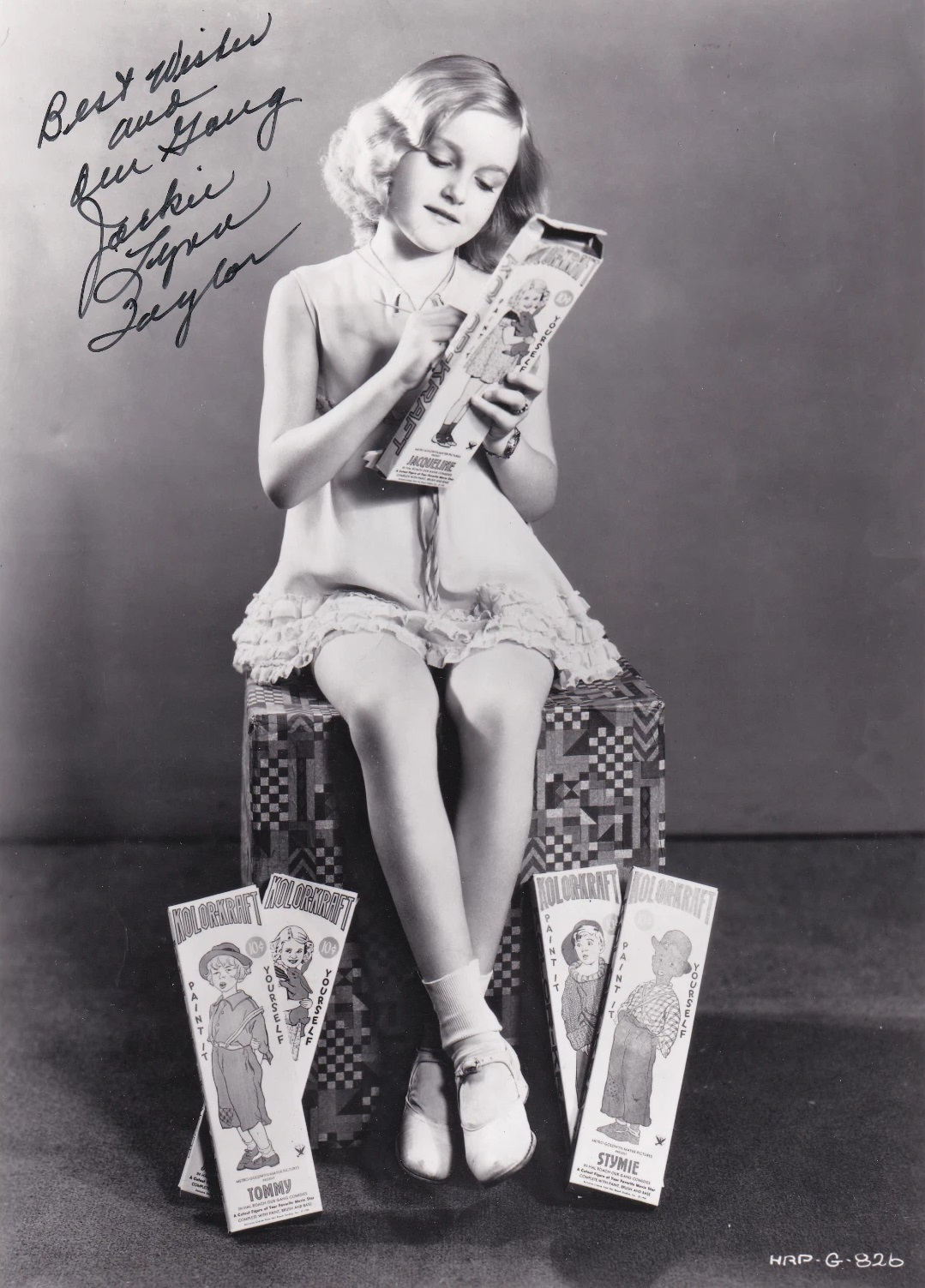
- Taylor in 1935
- Born: Jacklyn DeVon Taylor; June 29, 1925; Compton, California, U.S.
- Died: May 5, 2014 (aged 88); Citrus Heights, California, U.S.
- Occupation: Actress
- Years active: 1933–1951
- Spouse: Ben Bard (m. 1948; div. 1954) Jack Fries (m. 1966)

Jacklyn DeVon Taylor (June 29, 1925 – May 5, 2014), professionally known as Jackie Lynn Taylor, was an American child actress.

== Biography ==
Jacklyn DeVon Taylor was born in Compton, California, and appeared in five Our Gang short subjects from 1934 to 1935. She often portrayed the sister or girlfriend of one of the boys, usually Wally Albright.

She joined KTTV in 1951 as the hostess of the first daily two-hour variety show in the Los Angeles area. For over ten years, she had the top-rated television show in the San Diego area. Her credits also include directing and producing television programs as well as performing in over 75 movies, numerous TV dramas and national commercials.

== Personal life ==
In 1948, Taylor married Ben Bard, who was a film actor, stage actor, and acting teacher. They divorced in 1954.

Taylor and her second husband, television producer/journalist Jack Fries, who were married for 48 years until her death, produced and co-hosted Little Rascals Family Theater, which aired in Southern California from the mid 1970s through the mid 1980s. Segments of the show, including interviews with several former Gang members as adults, are available on home video.

Jackie and Jack discussed bias in the news as well as Taylor's Our Gang films. In 1975, they moved to Kansas City, Missouri, to study for the ministry. Jack was ordained in 1977, Jackie in 1979. They have served churches in St. Joseph and Kansas City (Missouri), San Juan Capistrano and San Diego (California), and Reno/Carson City (Nevada).

The couple retired in Sacramento. Both taught Voice Power Dynamics at Sierra College in Rocklin, California, operated their RascalandUSA.com website, and spoke before service clubs and civic organizations in Northern California. They were working on a joint autobiography, Suddenly It’s Tomorrow, which was to be released in late 2006.

== Death ==
Jackie Taylor Fries died from Alzheimer's disease on May 5, 2014, aged 88.
