= Pitts and Todd =

1930s comedy duo

Pitts and Todd were a 1930s movie comedy duo consisting of actresses ZaSu Pitts and Thelma Todd. Assembled by Hal Roach as the female counterparts to Laurel and Hardy, upon Pitts' departure, similar duos were formed that included Todd and/or actresses Patsy Kelly, Pert Kelton and Lyda Roberti.

== History ==
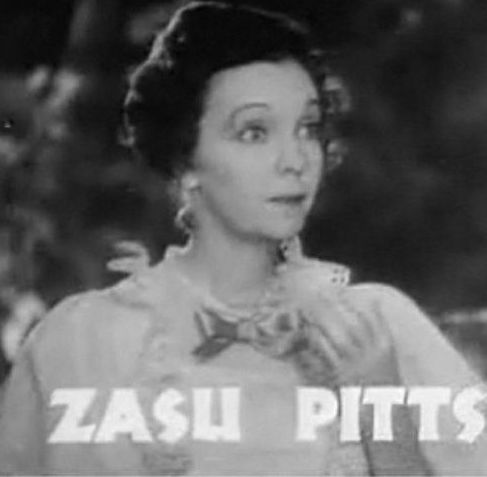
ZaSu Pitts

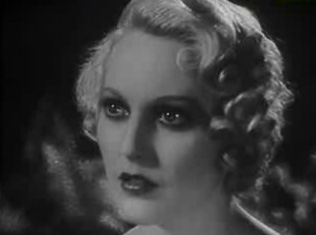
Thelma Todd

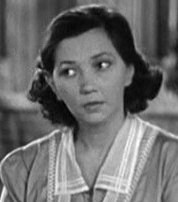
Patsy Kelly

Roach had previously paired Anita Garvin and Marion Byron in 1928 and 1929, but only three films resulted. Pitts and Todd had both previously worked with Roach in various short films and feature films before filming 17 shorts for Roach from 1931 to 1933.

The 1930 Leroy Shield song "Beautiful Lady" was used as the theme song for the Pitts and Todd films. Stan Laurel and Oliver Hardy made a guest appearance in the 1931 short On the Loose. The 1932 short Show Business was directed by Jules White and was later reworked as the 1936 Three Stooges Columbia short A Pain in the Pullman. These popular pre-code shorts feature frequent female physical comedy, human limb twister piles, and mugging from Pitts and Todd, with the latter often "accidentally" losing her clothing.

In mid-1933, Pitts left the Hal Roach studios and Patsy Kelly was hired as Todd's new partner. This team filmed 21 short films until Todd's death at the end of 1935. Kelly was next paired with Pert Kelton for one short, and then with Lyda Roberti for two shorts and one feature film, Nobody's Baby. Roberti died in 1938 at age 31.

In 1941, Pitts and Kelly made their only appearance together in the feature film Broadway Limited. The women echo Laurel and Hardy in one sequence when sharing a bed with a baby and a leaking hot-water bottle.

== Filmography ==
All short subjects were released by Hal Roach Studios and MGM. Many were directed by Gus Meins and featured Billy Gilbert as the exasperated heavy or comic foil.

=== ZaSu Pitts and Thelma Todd ===
- Let's Do Things (1931)
- Catch-as-Catch-Can (1931)
- The Pajama Party (1931)
- War Mamas (1931)
- On the Loose (1931)
- Sealskins (1932)
- Red Noses (1932)
- Strictly Unreliable (1932)
- The Old Bull (1932)
- Show Business (1932)
- Alum and Eve (1932)
- The Soilers (1932)
- Sneak Easily (1933)
- Asleep in the Feet (1933)
- Maids a la Mode (1933)
- The Bargain of the Century (1933)
- One Track Minds (1933) (with Spanky McFarland and Sterling Holloway)

=== Thelma Todd and Patsy Kelly ===
- Beauty and the Bus (1933)
- Backs to Nature (1933)
- Air Fright (1933)
- Babes in the Goods (1934)
- Soup and Fish (1934)
- Maid in Hollywood (1934)
- I'll Be Suing You (1934)
- Three Chumps Ahead (1934)
- One-Horse Farmers (1934)
- Opened by Mistake (1934)
- Done in Oil (1934)
- Bum Voyage (1934)
- Treasure Blues (1935)
- Sing Sister Sing (1935)
- The Tin Man (1935)
- The Misses Stooge (1935)
- Slightly Static (1935)
- Twin Triplets (1935)
- Hot Money (1935)
- Top Flat (1935)
- An All-American Toothache (1936)

=== Patsy Kelly and Pert Kelton ===
- Pan Handlers (1936)

=== Patsy Kelly and Lyda Roberti ===
- Hill-Tillies (1936)
- At Sea Ashore (1936)
- Nobody's Baby (1937)

=== ZaSu Pitts and Patsy Kelly ===
- Broadway Limited (United Artists, 1941)
