= Soup and Fish =

1934 film

- Directed by: Gus Meins
- Produced by: Hal Roach
- Starring: Thelma Todd; Patsy Kelly
- Cinematography: Francis Corby
- Edited by: Louis McManus
- Music by: Leroy Shield
- Distributed by: Metro-Goldwyn-Mayer
- Release date: March 31, 1934
- Running time: 18 min
- Country: United States
- Language: English

Soup and Fish is a 1934 American pre-Code comedy short directed by Gus Meins and starring Thelma Todd and Patsy Kelly. It was released by Metro-Goldwyn-Mayer, produced by Hal Roach and it is the 5th entry in the Todd and Kelly pairing for the series.

== Cast ==
- Thelma Todd as Thelma
- Patsy Kelly as Patsy
- Billy Gilbert as Count Gustav
- Gladys Gale as Mrs. Dukesberry
- Don Barclay as 1st butler
- Ernie Alexander as dog hospital intern
- Baldwin Cooke as 4th butler
- Charlie Hall as 2nd butler
- Alphonse Martell as 3rd butler
- Virginia Karns as daughter
- Eric Mayne as man receiving electric permanent
- Ellinor Vanderveer as society matron
