= Patsy Kelly =

American actress (1910–1981)

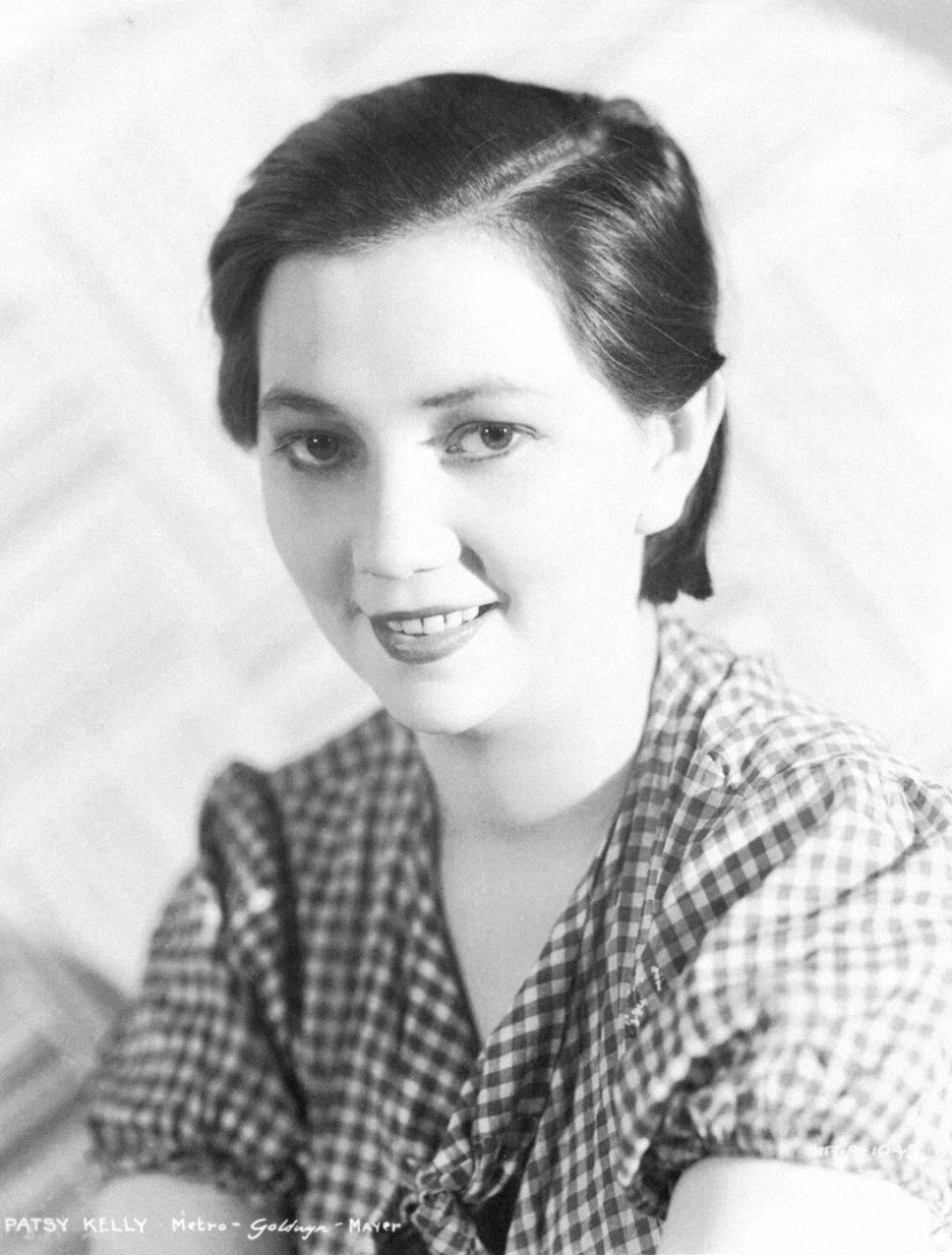
- Kelly in 1930
- Born: Bridget Sarah Veronica Rose Kelly; January 12, 1910; Brooklyn, New York, U.S.
- Died: September 24, 1981 (aged 71); Woodland Hills, Los Angeles, California, U.S.
- Resting place: Calvary Cemetery, Queens, New York
- Occupation: Actress
- Years active: 1927–1979

Patsy Kelly (born Bridget Sarah Veronica Rose Kelly; January 12, 1910 – September 24, 1981) was an American actress. She is known for her role as the brash, wisecracking sidekick to Thelma Todd in a series of comedy shorts produced by Hal Roach in the 1930s. Kelly continued to appear in similar roles after Todd's death in 1935.

After her film career declined in the mid-1940s, Kelly returned to New York City, where she worked in radio and summer stock. She also became a lifelong friend and personal assistant of Tallulah Bankhead's. Kelly returned to the screen after 17 years with guest spots on television and sporadic film roles. She returned to the stage in the 1971 revival of No, No, Nanette, for which she won a Tony Award.

== Early life and early career ==
Kelly was born Bridget Sarah Veronica Rose Kelly in Brooklyn, New York City, to Irish immigrant parents John and Delia Kelly. Her father was a police officer who left Ballinrobe, County Mayo, Ireland around 1900 to escape persecution. He died in 1942. Her mother Delia died in 1930. She was the youngest of five children, only two of whom were born in America. She acquired the nickname "Patsy" by being the butt of her family's gentle teasing and becoming the "fall guy" for many of their shenanigans. "I was always spinning and tripping about the house, usually over chairs." She was originally inspired to become a firefighter decades before the field would open to the first FDNY woman in 1982, but her mother enrolled her in a dancing school to keep her off the streets of Manhattan.

Her New York entertainment debut came as a member of a vaudeville chorus at age 12. Learning how to tap dance at Jack Blue's School of Rhythm and Tap, she befriended future talent and fellow hoofer Ruby Keeler. She had had more than her share of scrapes when she was young. She fell from a fire escape when she was seven, was struck by an automobile when she was eight, and was involved in no less than five accidents in one week at the age of nine. At this point, her parents decided to send her to dancing school, where she broke her ankle at the end of her first week. She first attended St. Paul's Cathedral School, then Professional Children's School with Keeler.

In 1923, at age 13, she advanced from pupil to instructor, making $18 a week but coming home at nearly two or three in the morning. "So," Kelly once recalled, reminiscing about the years leading up to that, "Father Quinn, who knew about me and my tap, advised my mother to send me to dancing school. He thought perhaps that would get me interested in something besides baseball. It did. I liked the dancing, and in time, I began to teach in the school where I had just been studying."

She performed in Frank Fay's act, first in a song-and-dance routine and later as Fay's comic foil. Her brother John W. (Willie) originally tried out for the job, but ultimately, Kelly ended up landing the position at The Palace Theatre with Fay, while Willie went to work at the Waldorf Astoria, after being Fay's chauffeur for a while. "My brother didn't care. He thought it was sissy stuff, anyhow." In one routine, Kelly told Fay and the audience that she had been at the beauty parlor. Fay remarked, "And they didn't wait on you?" She remained with Fay for several seasons until Fay eventually dismissed her, either for refusing a proposal of marriage, not calling him by his surname, or refusing to travel to England.

=== Broadway ===
Kelly made her Broadway debut in 1927, performing in Harry Delmar's Revels with Bert Lahr and Winnie Lightner at the Shubert Theatre. In other Broadway activity, she performed in Three Cheers (1928) with Will Rogers and Dorothy Stone, Earl Carroll's Sketch Book (1929) with William Demarest and Faith Bacon, Earl Carroll's Vanities (1930) with Jack Benny and Jimmy Savo, The Wonder Bar (1931) with Al Jolson, and in the Howard Dietz-Arthur Schwartz musical revue Flying Colors (1932) with Clifton Webb, Imogene Coca, Buddy Ebsen, and Charles Butterworth. In her later years, she appeared in No, No, Nanette (1971) with Ruby Keeler and Jack Gilford, and Irene (1973) with Debbie Reynolds.

== Film career ==
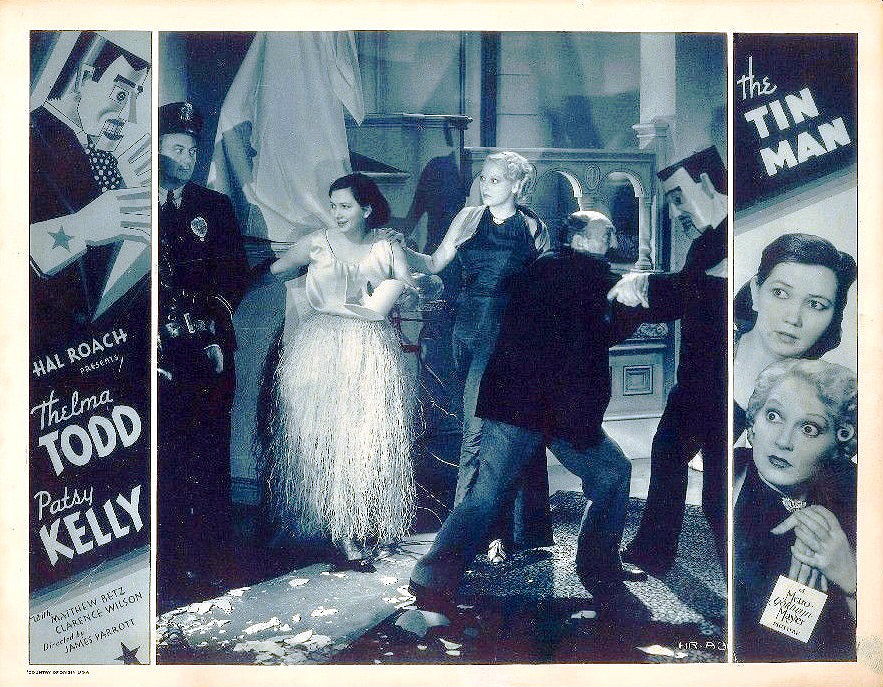
Lobby card for short comedy The Tin Man (1935) with Patsy Kelly and Thelma Todd

=== The early 1930s ===
Kelly made her screen debut in a Vitaphone short subject filmed in Brooklyn, The Grand Dame (1931), where she plays a rich gun moll. In 1933, reputedly after seeing her in Flying Colors, producer Hal Roach hired Kelly to team up with Thelma Todd in a series of short-subject comedies, and to replace her then-current co-star ZaSu Pitts after a contract dispute, beginning with Beauty and the Bus (1933). Pitts had demanded a salary hike of $8000 per script, so Roach terminated her services. Before making the move to Hollywood, Kelly intimated, "I'll be a flop in movies. Besides, I don't like 'em, and I never did believe there was a place called Hollywood. Somebody made it up!" She once confided to Motion Picture, "I tried it for a few days and thought it was the silliest fool business in the world. I had to get up about five in the morning and get a lantern to light my way to the studio. I'd get there and there'd be no audience, no applause. It was like talking to myself. Someone was always hollering, 'Quiet!' or 'Hush!' My voice was always too loud or not loud enough. You had to knock yourself out with a powder puff in this business. Make up every minute. I was always hanging out a window, off the edge of a cliff, or from the side of a car going 90 miles an hour. Or I was being knocked on the bean with a pot or a pan. First day I was yelling, 'Say, where are those doubles I've heard about?' After a few days of it, I packed my duds and took a train back east."

Kelly, therefore, was quite reluctant to make the transition to films at first, but Thelma Todd encouraged her to remain in Hollywood, so she did. Todd even drove to Pasadena to stop Kelly from returning on the train bound for New York. She also helped Kelly with her finances and tax trouble during the first few stages of her move out west. Already in debt, Todd suggested to her not to file for bankruptcy, that it would damage her credit rating. "Those were the happiest days I had in pictures," Patsy said in 1937, "I have made more money since, but the fun Thelma and I had making those silly two-reel comedies is something that comes only once in a lifetime. Thelma was better than any tonic and taught me a lot about comedy."

Shortly after filming wrapped on Beauty and the Bus, in August 1933, Kelly was injured as a passenger in a car driven by Gene Malin, the prominent drag performer. Malin apparently confused the gears and reversed off a pier into the water, after performing at the Ship Cafe, a club in Venice, Los Angeles. Malin was killed; Kelly and fellow passenger Jimmy Forlenza suffered serious injuries. She was told by the doctors that she had only 10 years left to live based on the amount of sandy water that got into her lungs, but actually survived for decades after the accident. Kelly once said, "I overheard a jury of grave-faced doctors nodding their heads over my supposedly unconscious body. They were giving me a maximum of 10 years to live. Maybe they're right. When I heard that scientific verdict, I was plenty scared. But I pulled myself together and said, 'Kelly, there's only one way to beat this rap: don't worry — and have fun out of the remaining years.'"

The Todd-Kelly shorts cemented Kelly's image as a brash, freewheeling, fun-loving, wisecracking woman who frequently punctured the pomposity of other characters. Most were directed by Gus Meins, such as Air Fright (1933), Maid in Hollywood (1934), and Babes in the Goods (1934). Later entries in the series, such as Slightly Static (1935), showcased Kelly's dancing skills. Referring to the time she spent at the Hal Roach Studios, Kelly exclaimed: "I laughed from the time I arrived at the studio until I left at night. I was almost ashamed to take a paycheck." Kelly made 21 shorts with Todd before Todd died in 1935 of carbon monoxide poisoning after filming An All-American Toothache (1936) with Mickey Daniels and Duke York. Years later, regarding Todd's death, Kelly revealed, "She had a fight with her lover at a party that night. I wasn't there but friends of mine were and they told me about it. There were a lot of suspicious things surrounding her death that never got explained. She most certainly wasn't drunk. Thelma used to nurse one drink for a whole evening and she never touched drugs of any kind. She was a strong New England woman with a powerful sense of humor and a wonderful zest for life. I always figured God wanted another angel. She was too young and too beautiful..."

Todd was eventually replaced by the bubbly Pert Kelton for one short, Pan Handlers (1936), but Kelton was quickly replaced by Lyda Roberti, a Polish-born comedienne with a thick foreign accent. Together, they starred in the cute Hal Roach comedy Nobody's Baby (1937) just before Roberti's untimely death. According to Kelly, Roberti died of heart failure in 1938 while bending over to tie a shoelace. Incidents like these further perpetuated Kelly's reputation as a jinx in Hollywood, and though some considered her bad luck, her performances were never hampered by this. "You see, something, darned if I know what it is, has happened to me since I came to this crazy town. Everyone I loved, turned to, needed, has gone, just like Thelma. It was Jean Malin, that swell New York actor and impersonator, first. I'd been a friend of Jean and his wife for years in New York. Then I went down to the Ship Café that night of Jean's disappearance. I glanced up at the flashing sign over the door that said, 'Jean Malin's last night,' and as clearly as I'm hearing you, a voice said, 'Be careful, it is his last night.' He backed the car into the ocean off the end of the pier just one hour later. We were all submerged in the water. Adrenalin worked with me. It didn't with Jean."

Her feature-length debut was playing the role of Jill Barker in MGM’s Going Hollywood (1933); she shared screen time with the likes of Marion Davies, Bing Crosby, Fifi D’Orsay, and Ned Sparks. The part was a little more than a mere walk-on, and she did not have a chance to show off her musical talents in it, although the picture does contain several delightful musical moments supplied by entertainers including Crosby and the Radio Rogues.

Kelly's various film roles in the 1930s ranged from the deadpan, screwball comedic to the impressively and powerfully dramatic. Very little was written that she could not handle on screen. On the comedic side, she showed up in such light-hearted Americana as Pick a Star (1937) with Rosina Lawrence, Jack Haley, and Laurel and Hardy, in the knee-slapping boxing comedy Kelly the Second (1936) with Guinn Williams and Charley Chase, and in the biting political satire Thanks A Million (1935) with Dick Powell, Ann Dvorak, and famed radio personality Fred Allen. For drama, she showed off her more serious side in films such as the politically flavored Jean Harlow vehicle The Girl From Missouri (1934) with Franchot Tone and Lionel Barrymore and Private Number (1936) starring Loretta Young and Basil Rathbone.

In 1935, before Todd's death and after Stan Laurel had a falling out with Hal Roach over a contract disagreement, talk arose of Kelly joining Oliver Hardy to play his wife and Spanky McFarland’s mother in a series called The Hardy Family, but the project was jettisoned when Laurel returned to the fold. A pilot entitled Their Night Out was announced, with James W. Horne slated to direct, but it never got past the talking stage. She was in the running to play Laurel's wife in Sons of the Desert (1933), but the part was eventually filled by Dorothy Christy.

During the 1930s, Kelly also appeared in musicals such as Going Hollywood (1933), the college football extravaganza Pigskin Parade (1936) with Stuart Erwin and Judy Garland (in her first film role), playing second banana in Sing, Baby, Sing (1936) with Gregory Ratoff, Adolphe Menjou, and Ted Healy, and Paramount Pictures' Every Night at Eight (1935), playing one of a trio of hopeful singers (the other two played by Alice Faye and Frances Langford) who are discovered by an ambitious, blue-collar bandleader by the name of Tops Cardona sympathetically played by George Raft, who christens them "the Swanee Sisters". In the film, Kelly gets to showcase her singing talents by crooning out Jimmy McHugh-Dorothy Fields melodies such as the light and breezy "I Feel a Song Coming On" and "Speaking Confidentially". The movie introduced the world to the song "I'm in the Mood for Love", which is sung by Langford. The tap dancing she learned when she was young was put to good use in 20th Century Fox's Thanks a Million and Warner Bros.' Go Into Your Dance (1935) starring Ruby Keeler and Al Jolson in their only screen pairing. According to columnist Ruth White: "Wherever you find a laughing group on a sound stage, you will find Patsy in the center of it. She's everybody's friend, as kindly to the prop boys as she is with the most famous stars... This jolly picture thief... makes picture work such play that not until the film is previewed do her co-stars realize she has stolen the show."

=== The late 1930s and early 1940s ===
In 1936, she told an interviewer: "Of course I was fortunate in having enjoyed a long and fairly successful stage career before going to Hollywood, but just the same, I had to start all over again, as there is as much difference between stage and screen acting technique as there is between day and night... The average small-town girl who comes to Movieland without previous stage or screen experience will find the road ahead rough and heartbreaking at times."

In 1937, she was sent to a sanitarium to go on a diet and she lost 50 pounds. Though the new, slimmer Kelly did not last too long, she was quite proud of her accomplishment. "Look! I can almost hide behind Gary Cooper sideways!"

By the end of the decade, she appeared as shopgirl Peggy O' Brien in Hal Roach's There Goes My Heart (1938), starring Fredric March and Virginia Bruce playing Alan Mowbray's love interest, and as Kitty in The Gorilla (1939) featuring a creepy Bela Lugosi and the always delightfully zany and offbeat Ritz Brothers, a performance she once cited as the favorite performance of her own. In the early 1940s, her proficient acting and comedic talents had her share the screen with big-named stars such as John Barrymore (in his final film role), Gary Cooper, Merle Oberon, Walter Brennan, John Wayne, Bert Lahr, Lupe Velez, Eddie Albert, Victor McLaglen, and even Phil Silvers and Ann Miller in their big-screen debut, Hit Parade of 1941. She also co-starred with her predecessor ZaSu Pitts in Roach's train comedy Broadway Limited (1941) around this period. Familiar faces that appear frequently in her films include Si Jenks, Douglas Fowley, Charlie Hall, Marion Davies, Don Barclay, and Arthur Housman.

In her films, one could find her often playing a sassy maid or an assistant, as she did in features such as Page Miss Glory, The Gorilla, Topper Returns, and Merrily We Live. Subsequently, these comic supporting roles were a harbinger of things to come for Kelly. She jested that she was often cast as a maid, "...because I had a maid's costume that fit. They didn't have to get me a new outfit. They lent it from one studio to another."

After appearing in a film or two for RKO, she then began starring in low-budget fare such as My Son, The Hero (1943) with Roscoe Karns and Maxie Rosenbloom, and Danger! Women at Work (1943), pictures released by Producers Releasing Corporation.

== Later career ==
Kelly's film career had stalled in the 1940s after being blackballed by the studios for outing herself as a lesbian. She returned to New York City, where she worked in radio with personalities such as Barry Wood on NBC's The Palmolive Party (which was broadcast on Saturday nights at 10 pm), toured the U.S. and Canada to entertain the troops during World War II, and did summer stock theatre in shows such as My Sister Eileen and On the Town. She also worked as a personal assistant to Tallulah Bankhead and appeared with her on stage in Dear Charles (1955). She later moved into Bankhead's mansion Windows in Bedford Village, New York, acting as her domestic, or "guest resident".

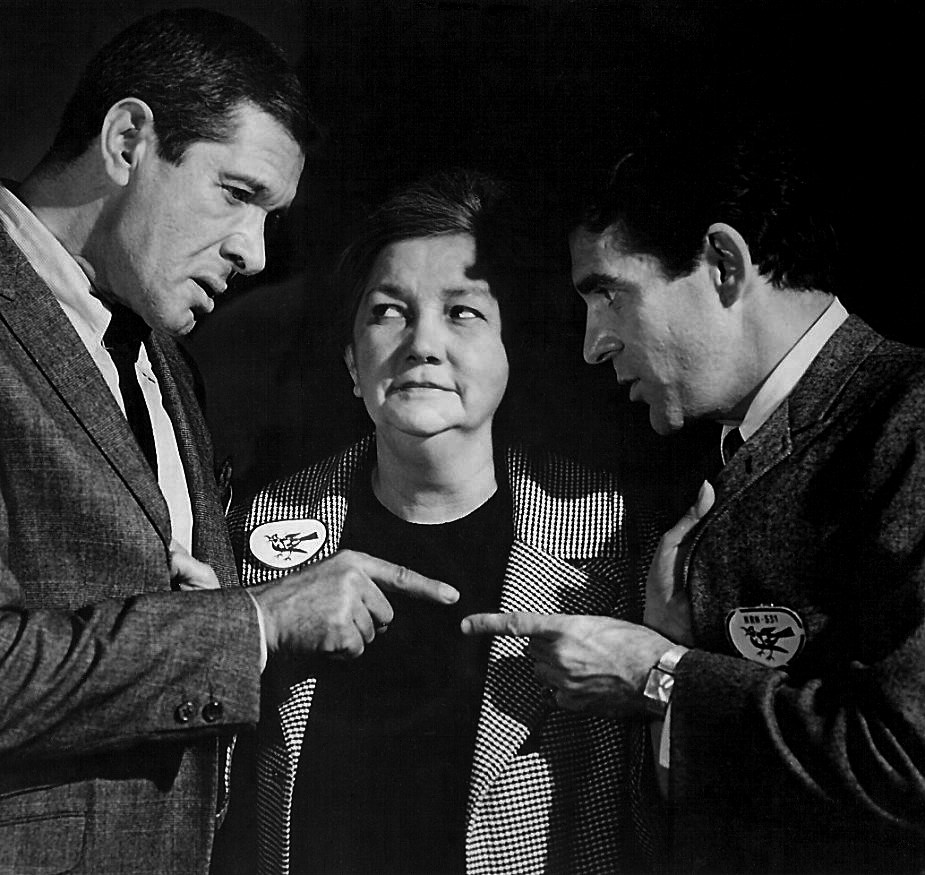
Photo of guest stars Jan Murray, Patsy Kelly and Pat Harrington Jr. from the television program The Man From U.N.C.L.E.. The three play roles of THRUSH executives jockeying for power in the organization in the episode "The Hula Doll Affair".

In the 1950s, Kelly began acting on television and returned to occasional film roles. On TV, she appeared in guest roles on 26 Men, Kraft Television Theatre, The Man from U.N.C.L.E, The Dick Van Dyke Show, The Wild Wild West, and Alfred Hitchcock Presents, as well as many unsold pilots. During the 1960s, she made memorable appearances as Mac the Nurse in The Naked Kiss (1964) and as Laura-Louise McBirney in the psychological horror film Rosemary's Baby (1968), directed by Roman Polanski, alongside veteran actors Sidney Blackmer, Ruth Gordon, Ralph Bellamy, and Maurice Evans.

In 1971, Kelly returned to Broadway in the revival of No, No, Nanette with fellow hoofers Ruby Keeler and Helen Gallagher. She scored a huge success as the wisecracking, tap-dancing maid, and won Broadway's 1971 Tony Award for Best Featured Actress in a Musical for her performance in the show. She matched that success the following year, when she starred in Irene with Debbie Reynolds, and was again nominated for a Tony.

In 1976, Kelly appeared as the housekeeper Mrs. Schmauss in the Walt Disney film Freaky Friday starring Jodie Foster and Barbara Harris. Her last role in a feature film was in another Disney comedy, The North Avenue Irregulars (1979), also co-starring Harris, along with Cloris Leachman, Edward Herrmann, and Karen Valentine. Kelly's final onscreen appearance was a guest spot in a two-part episode of The Love Boat in 1979.

She continued appearing in film and television roles until she suffered a stroke in January 1980 that limited her ability to speak.

== Personal life ==
Kelly was a lesbian, but her sexuality was apparently unknown to the public during her career. She described herself as a "big dyke" to a biographer, but forbade him to publish that information until her career was over. The quote was published in 1994, long after Kelly's death. Kelly had perhaps hinted at her sexual orientation during the 1930s, when she revealed to Motion Picture magazine how she had been sharing an apartment with actress Wilma Cox for several years with no intention of getting married. However, Kelly never publicly claimed to be a lesbian due in part to probable harm to her reputation and career in that era. Kelly later confirmed she had an affair with actress Tallulah Bankhead while working as Bankhead's personal assistant.

Reportedly, Kelly was briefly engaged to a serviceman named Otto Malde in 1942, but the marriage never materialized.

Kelly loved food and eventually learned how to cook well.

In addition to performing in films, Kelly was a rabid film fan and sometimes watched seven or eight films a week.

Kelly enjoyed badminton, poker, and golf.

In 1933, she survived a catastrophic car crash that killed Jean Malin, one of her closest friends.

In January 1980, Kelly, while in San Francisco, suffered a stroke that caused her to lose the ability to speak. She was admitted to Englewood Nursing Home in Englewood, New Jersey, on the advice of her old friend Ruby Keeler, where she underwent therapy.

== Death ==
On September 24, 1981, Kelly died of cancer at the Motion Picture & Television Country House and Hospital in Woodland Hills, California. Her funeral was held on September 28 at St. Malachy Roman Catholic Church in Manhattan. She is interred alongside her parents, John and Delia Kelly, in Calvary Cemetery in Queens, New York.

For her contribution to the motion picture industry, she has a star on the Hollywood Walk of Fame at 6669 Hollywood Boulevard, right near Musso & Frank Grill.

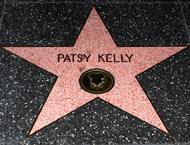
Patsy Kelly's star on the Hollywood Walk of Fame

== Credits ==
Stage

Year	Title	Role	Performance dates
1927	Harry Delmar's Revels	various	(Nov 28, 1927 - Mar 1928)
1928	Three Cheers	Bobbie Bird	(Oct 15, 1928 - Apr 13, 1929)
1929	Earl Carroll's Sketch Book	various	(Jul 01, 1929 - Jun 07, 1930)
1930	Earl Carroll's Vanities	various	(Jul 01, 1930 - Jan 03, 1931)
1931	The Wonder Bar	Electra Pivonka	(Mar 17, 1931 - May 29, 1931)
1932	Flying Colors	Lessie Bevis/Mrs. McVitty	(Sep 15, 1932 - Jan 25, 1933)
1955	Dear Charles	Madame Bouchemin	(Sep 15, 1954 - Jan 29, 1955)
1971	No, No, Nanette	Pauline	(Jan 07, 1971 - Oct 28, 1972)
1973	Irene	Mrs. O'Dare	(Mar 13, 1973 - May 3, 1975)

Short subjects

- Expensive Kisses (1930)
- The Grand Dame (1931)
- Beauty and the Bus (1933) teamed with Thelma Todd
- Backs to Nature (1933) teamed with Thelma Todd
- Air Fright (1933) teamed with Thelma Todd
- Babes in the Goods (1934) teamed with Thelma Todd
- Soup and Fish (1934) teamed with Thelma Todd
- Roamin' Vandals (1934)
- Maid in Hollywood (1934) teamed with Thelma Todd
- I'll Be Suing You (1934) teamed with Thelma Todd
- Three Chumps Ahead (1934) teamed with Thelma Todd
- One-Horse Farmers (1934) teamed with Thelma Todd
- Opened By Mistake (1934) teamed with Thelma Todd
- Done In Oil (1934) teamed with Thelma Todd
- Bum Voyage (1934) teamed with Thelma Todd
- Treasure Blues (1935) teamed with Thelma Todd
- Sing Sister Sing (1935) teamed with Thelma Todd
- The Tin Man (1935) teamed with Thelma Todd
- The Misses Stooge (1935) teamed with Thelma Todd
- Slightly Static (1935) teamed with Thelma Todd
- Twin Triplets (1935) teamed with Thelma Todd
- Hot Money (1935) teamed with Thelma Todd
- Top Flat (1935) teamed with Thelma Todd
- An All-American Toothache (1936) teamed with Thelma Todd
- Pan Handlers (1936) teamed with Pert Kelton
- At Sea Ashore (1936) teamed with Lyda Roberti
- Hill-Tillies (1936) teamed with Lyda Roberti
- Babies, They're Wonderful! (1947)

Filmography

Year	Title	Role	Notes
1929	A Single Man	uncredited/unknown/bit	silent film
1933	Going Hollywood	Jill Barker	
1934	The Countess of Monte Cristo	Mimi Schmidt	
1934	The Girl from Missouri	Kitty Lennihan	
1934	The Party's Over	Mabel	
1934	Transatlantic Merry-Go-Round	Patsy Clarke	
1935	Go into Your Dance	Irma 'Toledo' Knight	
1935	Every Night at Eight	Daphne O' Connor	
1935	Page Miss Glory	Betty	
1935	Thanks a Million	Phoebe Mason	
1936	Private Number	Gracie	
1936	Kelly the Second	Molly Patricia Kelly	First starring feature film
1936	Sing, Baby, Sing	Fitz	
1936	Pigskin Parade	Bessie Winters	Alternative title: Harmony Parade
1937	Nobody's Baby	Kitty Reilly	
1937	Pick a Star	Nellie Moore	
1937	Ever Since Eve	Sadie Day, aka Susie Wilson	
1937	Wake Up and Live	Patsy Kane	
1938	Merrily We Live	Etta	
1938	There Goes My Heart	Peggy O'Brien	
1938	The Cowboy and the Lady	Katie Callahan	
1939	The Gorilla	Kitty	
1940	Hit Parade of 1941	Judy Abbott	Alternative title: Romance and Rhythm
1941	Road Show	Jinx	
1941	Topper Returns	Emily	
1941	Broadway Limited	Patsy Riley	
1941	Playmates	Lulu Monahan	
1942	Sing Your Worries Away	Bebe McGuire	
1942	In Old California	Helga	
1943	Ladies' Day	Hazel Jones	
1943	My Son, the Hero	Gertie Rosenthal	
1943	Danger! Women at Work	Terry Olsen	Last starring feature film
1960	Please Don't Eat the Daisies	Maggie	
1960	The Crowded Sky	Gertrude Ross	
1964	The Naked Kiss	Mac, the Head Nurse	
1966	The Ghost in the Invisible Bikini	Myrtle Forbush	
1967	C'mon, Let's Live a Little	Mrs. Fitts	
1968	Rosemary's Baby	Laura-Louise McBirney	
1970	The Phynx	Herself	
1976	Freaky Friday	Mrs. Schmauss	
1979	The North Avenue Irregulars	Mrs. Rose Rafferty / Blarney Stone, Irregular	Alternative title: Hill's Angels

TV credits

Year	Title	Role	Notes
1952–1953	All Star Revue	Various	6 episodes
1955	Lux Video Theatre		Season 5 Episode 24: "One Foot in Heaven"
1957	Kraft Television Theatre		Season 10 Episode 43: "The Big Break"
1959	26 Men	Big Kate	Season 2 Episode 30: "The Last Kill"
1960	Laramie	Bea	Season 1 Episode 19: "The Legend of Lily"
1960	The Untouchables	Slapsie Sadie	Season 1 Episode 27: "Head of Fire: Feet of Clay"
1960	Alfred Hitchcock Presents	Minnie Redwing	Season 6 Episode 7: "Outlaw in Town"
1962	The Dick Van Dyke Show	Juror	Season 1 Episode 24: "One Angry Man"
1962	Pete and Gladys	Katy	Season 2 Episode 33: "The Case of the Gossipy Maid"
1963	Arrest and Trial	Catalina Sorelli	Season 1 Episode 1: "Call It a Lifetime"
1964	Burke's Law	Agatha Beauregard / Big Mouth Annie	Season 1 Episode 27: "Who Killed WHO IV?" and "Who Killed Mr. Cartwheel"
1964	Burke's Law	Big Mouth Annie	Season 2 Episode 6: "Who Killed Mr. Cartwheel?"
1966	Vacation Playhouse	Miss Primrose	Season 4 Episode 6: "My Son, The Doctor"
1966	The Wild Wild West	Prudence Fortune	Season 2 Episode 4: "The Night of the Big Blast"
1967	The Wild Wild West	Mrs. Bancroft	"The Night of the Bogus Bandits"
1967	The Man from U.N.C.L.E.	Mama Sweet	Season 3 Episode 22: "The Hula Doll Affair"
1967	Laredo	Abbie Heffernan	Season 2 Episode 23: "A Question of Guilt"
1968	Bonanza	Mrs. Neeley	Season 9 Episode 16: "A Girl Named George"
1969	Love, American Style	Mrs. Hennessy	Season 1 Episode 6 (Segment: "Love and the Watchdog")
1969	The Pigeon	Mrs. Macready, the Landlady	ABC Movie of the Week
1970	Barefoot in the Park	Old Lady	Season 1 Episode 1: Pilot
1975–1976	The Cop and the Kid	Brigid Murphy	11 episodes
1979	The Love Boat	Mabel Hopkins	Season 3 Episode 10: "The Love Lamp Is Lit/Critical Success/Rent a Family/Take My Boyfriend, Please/The Man in Her Life: Part 1"
1979	The Love Boat	Mabel Hopkins	Season 3 Episode 11: "The Love Lamp Is Lit/Critical Success/Rent a Family/Take My Boyfriend, Please/The Man in Her Life: Part 2"

== Recordings ==
"I'm Gonna Hang My Hat On The Tree That Grows in Brooklyn" (Shapiro/Pescal/Cherig) played by Al Goodman and His Orchestra. Sung by Patsy Kelly and Barry Wood; V-Disc, Nov. 1944

== See also ==
- Pitts and Todd
