= Bed of Roses (1933 film) =

1933 film

- original film poster
- Directed by: Gregory LaCava; Charles Kerr (assistant)
- Written by: Wanda Tuchock; Gregory LaCava; Eugene Thackrey
- Produced by: Merian C. Cooper
- Starring: Constance Bennett; Joel McCrea; Pert Kelton
- Cinematography: Charles Rosher
- Edited by: Basil Wrangell
- Music by: Max Steiner
- Distributed by: RKO Radio Pictures
- Release date: July 14, 1933
- Running time: 70 minutes
- Country: United States
- Language: English

Bed of Roses is a 1933 pre-Code romantic comedy film co-written and directed by Gregory La Cava and starring Constance Bennett. The picture was released by RKO Radio Pictures with a supporting cast featuring Joel McCrea and Pert Kelton.

The film is preserved in the Library of Congress collection.

== Plot ==
Lorry and Minnie are prostitutes who occasionally get hapless male admirers drunk before robbing them. After being released from a Louisiana jail, they head down the Mississippi River on a steamboat. Lorry steals $60 from a "Mr. Smith" she entertains in her room, and when she is confronted by the boat's captain, who accuses her of the theft, she escapes by jumping off the vessel into the river. She loses the $60 as she is rescued by cotton-barge skipper Dan, so she robs him, too.

Once in New Orleans, Lorry disguises herself as a newspaper writer to meet publishing magnate Stephen Paige of whom she took notice on the steamboat. She then gets him drunk, takes him to his home, and the next morning blackmails him into supporting her, including renting a lavish apartment for her. She returns to the cotton barge and repays Dan his "loan" and they fall in love. Minnie now arrives at Lorry's apartment, soon followed by Stephen, who threatens to expose her sordid past, causing her to leave him, but not to return to Dan, whom she had agreed to marry. When Stephen cannot persuade her to return to him, he realizes that she really does love Dan, and he brings about their reunion with the help of the now-married Minnie.

== Cast ==
- Constance Bennett as Lorry Evans
- Joel McCrea as Dan
- John Halliday as Stephen Paige
- Pert Kelton as Minnie Brown Oglethorpe
- Samuel S. Hinds as Father Doran (as Samuel Hinds)
- Franklin Pangborn as Floorwalker
- Tom Francis as Salesman (as Tom Herbert)
- Wade Boteler as River Boat Purser
- Eddy Chandler as River Boat Steward
- Jane Darwell as Mrs. Webster - Head Prison Matron
- Arthur Hoyt as Hoyt - Paige's Secretary
- John Larkin as Black Man Meeting Released Prisoner
- Matt McHugh as "Jones"
- Robert Emmett O'Connor as River Boat Captain Scroggins
- George Reed as Alice - Dan's Shipboard Cook
- Mildred Washington as Genevieve, Lorry's Maid

== Reception ==
The film in 1933 received generally mediocre reviews in leading newspapers and trade papers. The one consistent exception in the print media's rather lukewarm reaction to the production was Pert Kelton, whose performance was widely praised. In his review for The New York Times, critic Mordaunt Hall views the "callous creature" portrayed by Constance Bennett as initially "disconcerting", and he finds parts of the story unbelievable, noting that its "characters do not always behave as if they were drawn from life." Hall, however, does recognize Kelton for doing "remarkably well as the slangy Minnie".

The Film Daily in its July 1, 1933, issue judges Bed of Roses as "average entertainment" and describes Bennett as moving "through her part without any distinction." On the other hand, Kelton's performance also impressed the trade paper. "She fits the hard-boiled part perfectly", The Film Daily observes, "and scores repeatedly with hearty laughs." Abel Green in his review for Variety, another widely read entertainment paper at the time, refers to the "so-so flicker" as "tawdry and unwholesome in the main". He too preferred to focus on Kelton:

It's a short cast but Pert Kelton stands out head and shoulders above everything with a Maywestish hip-rolling, nasal-twanging, get-your-man routine which is something of a surprise. It so eclipses the rest of it, including the star (in some of those scenes she makes a stooge out of Bennett) that it evidences an unsuspected magnanimity on the part of the star or a physical handicap which forfended any further editing. Miss Kelton...does not suggest the robust Miss West in build, other than in general demeanor. Hers is a more slinky vamp, wise cracking and ever-effective, with the choicest phrases handed to her.
