= The Misses Stooge =

1935 film

- Directed by: James Parrott
- Produced by: Hal Roach
- Starring: Thelma Todd; Patsy Kelly
- Cinematography: Walter Lundin
- Edited by: William Terhune
- Music by: Leroy Shield
- Distributed by: Metro-Goldwyn-Mayer
- Release date: April 20, 1935
- Running time: 19 minutes
- Country: United States
- Language: English

The Misses Stooge is a 1935 American comedy short released by Metro-Goldwyn-Mayer, produced by Hal Roach and directed by James Parrott, and starring Thelma Todd and Patsy Kelly. It is the 16th entry in the series.

== Cast ==
- Thelma Todd as Thelma
- Patsy Kelly as Patsy
- Esther Howard as the hostess
- Herman Bing as Sazerac the Magician
- Harry Bowen as Mr. Schmidt
- Rafael Alcayde as The Duke of Gigolette
- Henry Roquemore as Pinsky
