= Twin Triplets =

1935 film

- Directed by: William Terhune
- Produced by: Hal Roach
- Starring: Thelma Todd; Patsy Kelly
- Cinematography: William H. Ziegler
- Music by: Leroy Shield
- Distributed by: Metro-Goldwyn-Mayer
- Release date: October 12, 1935
- Running time: 19 min
- Country: United States
- Language: English

Twin Triplets is a 1935 American comedy short released by Metro-Goldwyn-Mayer, produced by Hal Roach and directed by James Parrott, and starring Thelma Todd and Patsy Kelly. It is the 18th entry in the series.

== Cast ==
- Thelma Todd as Thelma
- Patsy Kelly as Patsy
- Greta Meyer as Mrs. Borgerschmith
- John Dilson as J. Benton, City Editor
- Billy Bletcher as Merchant
- Bess Flowers as Nurse
- Charlie Hall as Ambulance Attendant
