= On the Loose (1931 film) =

1931 film

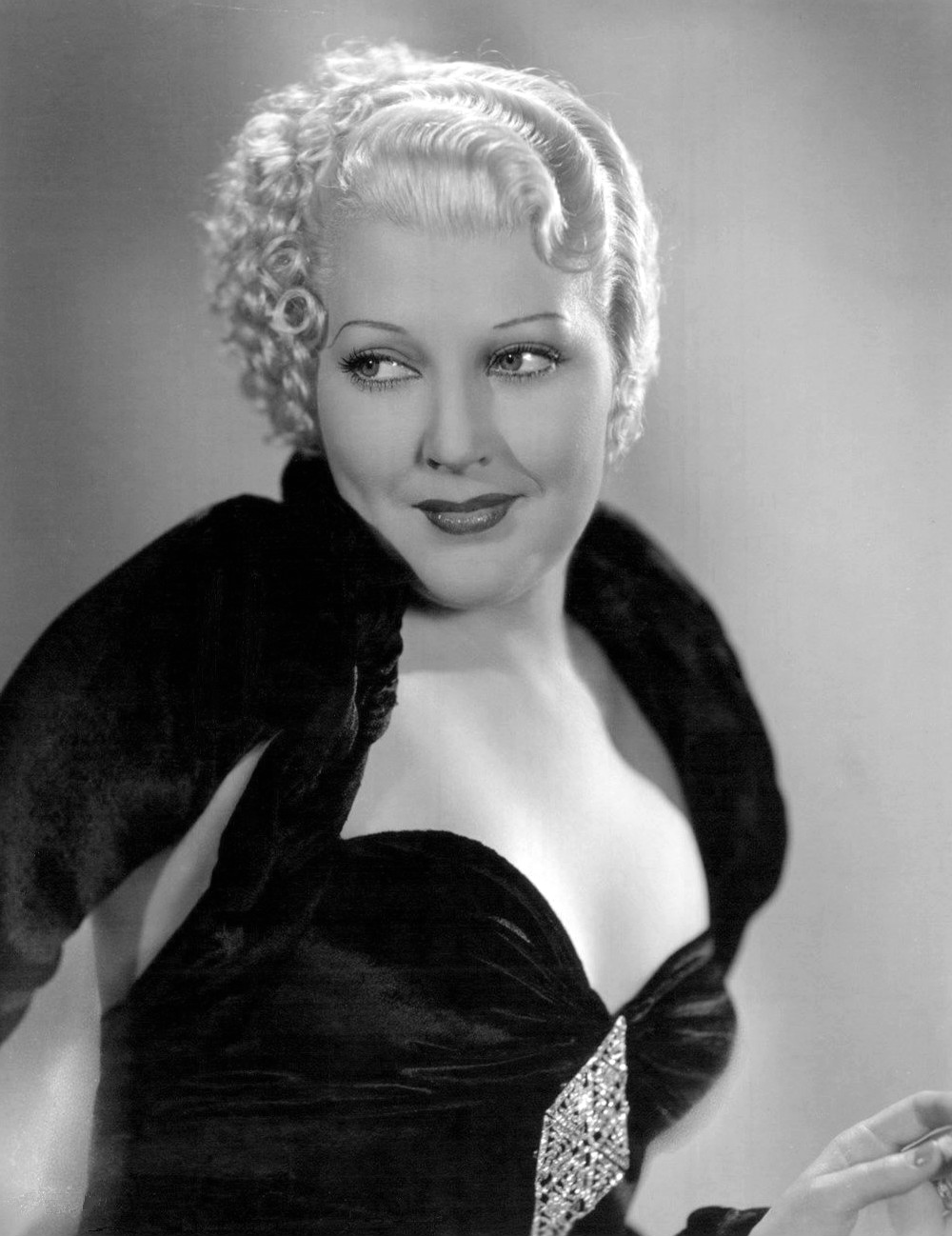
- Thelma Todd in 1933
- Directed by: Hal Roach
- Written by: H. M. Walker
- Produced by: Hal Roach
- Starring: ZaSu Pitts; Thelma Todd; Stan Laurel (guest); Oliver Hardy (guest)
- Music by: Leroy Shield
- Distributed by: Metro-Goldwyn-Mayer
- Release date: December 26, 1931
- Running time: 20:35
- Country: United States
- Language: English

On the Loose is a 1931 American pre-Code comedy short released by Metro-Goldwyn-Mayer, produced and directed by Hal Roach, and starring ZaSu Pitts and Thelma Todd. Laurel and Hardy make a guest appearance. It is the fifth film in the Pitts and Todd series.

== Plot ==
The short begins with Thelma and ZaSu entering their shared New York apartment and complaining about all of the cheap, monotonous dates they recently have endured. In every case their boyfriends have taken them to Coney Island. The next day, while stopping along a city sidewalk, a passing car splashes them with mud and water. The young male driver stops and offers to buy them some new clothes. They accept his offer and later agree to go on a date, which yet again involves a trip to Coney Island. The date does not go well, and they are relieved to go home.

== Laurel and Hardy guest ==
At the end of the film there is a knock at Thelma and ZaSu's apartment door. Stan and Ollie appear and ask them to go on a date to Coney Island. Angered by the offer, the frustrated roommates start throwing ornaments at Stan and Oliver who beat a hasty retreat. Laurel and Hardy are on screen for only 41 seconds.

== Cast ==
- ZaSu Pitts as ZaSu
- Thelma Todd as Thelma
- John Loder as Mr. Loder
- Claud Allister as Mr. Loder's friend
- Billy Gilbert as Pierre, the dressmaker
- Otto Fries (uncredited) as the belligerent bully
- Stan Laurel (uncredited) as Stan (guest)
- Oliver Hardy (uncredited) as Ollie (guest)
- Dorothy Layton (uncredited) as bully's girlfriend
