= The Tin Man (1935 film) =

1935 film

- Directed by: James Parrott
- Written by: Jack Jevne; William Terhune
- Produced by: Hal Roach
- Starring: Thelma Todd; Patsy Kelly
- Cinematography: Art Lloyd
- Edited by: Louis McManus
- Music by: Leroy Shield
- Distributed by: Metro-Goldwyn-Mayer
- Release date: March 30, 1935
- Running time: 19 minutes
- Country: United States
- Language: English

The Tin Man is a 1935 American comedy short released by Metro-Goldwyn-Mayer, produced by Hal Roach, directed by James Parrott, and starring Thelma Todd and Patsy Kelly. It is the 15th entry in the series.

== Plot summary ==
A comedic short where two friends, Thema and Patsy, find themselves in a house owned by a mad scientist.

The film starts with Thema and Patsy trying to find a house in the dark and fog. It is discovered that Thema wrote down the address when she was in the dark and did not realize that the pen was out of ink. They drive until they see a house with a light on, while driving, they hear a radio story about an escape convict, who is revealed to have been hiding in the back seat. A gag where the convict always in the same room, but never discovered will play through the whole film. After ringing the doorbell with no response, the pair enter the house to find it seemingly unoccupied and with cloth all over the furniture, but the women are being watched by a mad scientist through a peephole. He reveals to himself that he designed the house as a trap, intending to seek revenge on women for his spurred love life. The scientist activates a robot through which he attempts to seduce Patsy, by being mean to Thema. The scientist plays pranks on Thema until she gets fed up and attacks the robot, meanwhile, Patsy discovers the hidden scientist. She berates him as he loses control of the robot. After the conflict between the robot, mad scientist, and convict resolve, the women are able to escape the house.

== Cast ==
- Thelma Todd as Thelma
- Patsy Kelly as Patsy
- Matthew Betz as The Criminal
- Clarence Wilson as The Mad Scientist
- Billy Bletcher as The Voice of The Robot
