= Three Cheers =

1928 musical

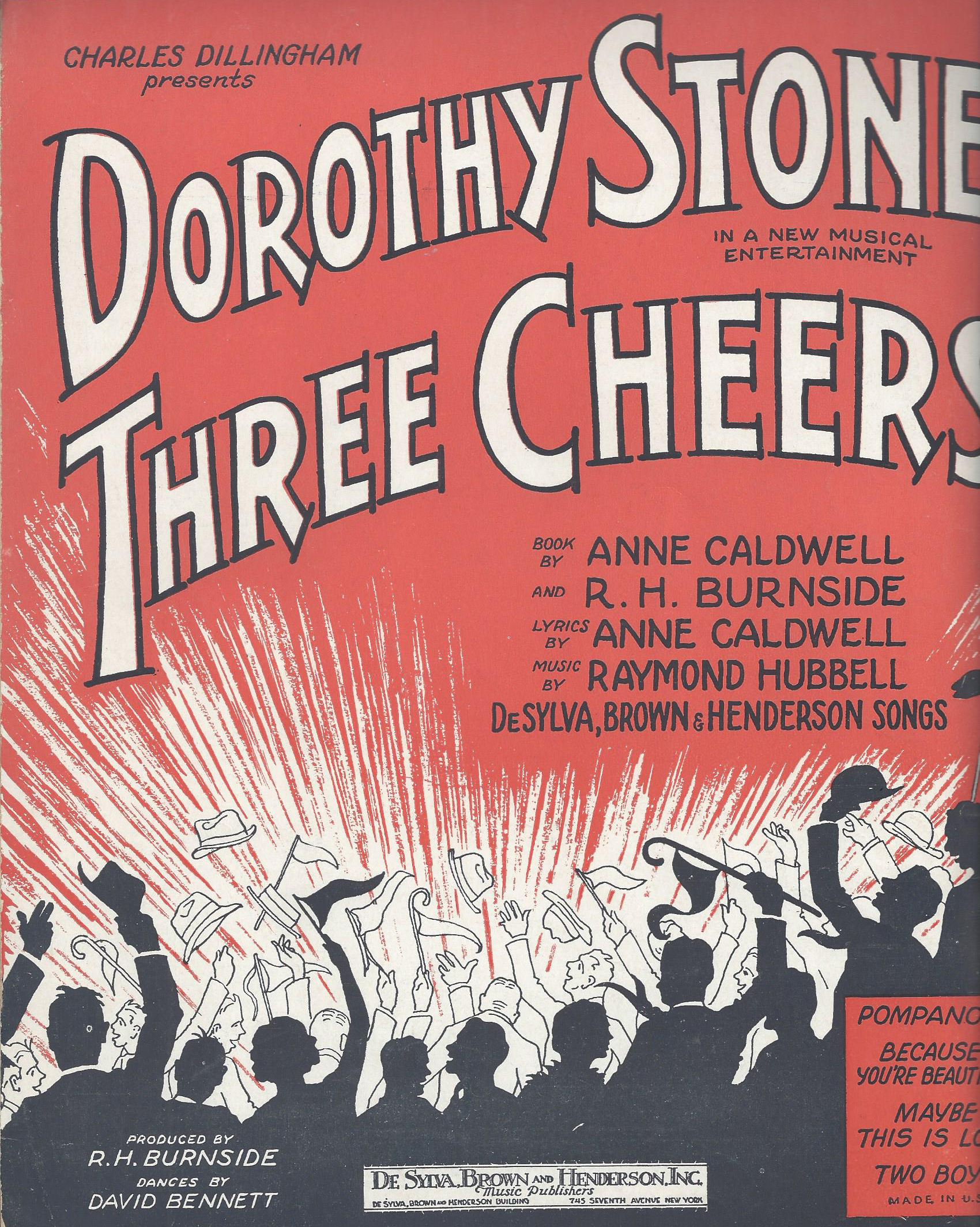
- Sheet Music Cover
- Music: Raymond Hubbell
- Lyrics: Anne Caldwell
- Book: Anne Caldwell and R. H. Burnside

Three Cheers is an American “new musical entertainment” (musical comedy) in two acts, with a book by Anne Caldwell and R. H. Burnside, lyrics by Anne Caldwell, and music by Raymond Hubbell with additional lyrics by Lew Brown and B. G. DeSylva and additional music by Ray Henderson. The show was presented by Charles Dillingham and produced by R. H. Burnside at the Globe Theatre, and opened October 15, 1928.

The show was staged by R. H. Burnside with dances by David Bennett. The musical director was George Hirst. The scenic designers were Sheldon K. Viele and Raymond Sovey, and costume design by Charles LeMaire. It ran for 210 performances, closing on April 13, 1929.

The cast headlined Dorothy Stone as Princess Sylvia and Will Rogers (substituting for Fred Stone who was injured in an airplane crash), as King Pompanola. Fred joined the cast later in the run. Other members of the cast included Edward Allan as Spike, Thea Dore as Floria Farleigh, Maude Eburne as Queen Ysobel, Alan Edwards as Harry Vance, Cynthia Foley as Ermyntrude, Kathryn Hereford as Mike, Patsy Kelly as Bobbie Bird, John Lambert as Malotte, James Murray as Captain Meurice, Janet Velie as Daphne De Lorne, Florine Phelps and Irene Phelps as Letty and Betty, Phyllis Rae as Zaia, Oscar Ragland as The Duke, and Evangeline Raleigh as Audrey Nugent.

Act I is set in and around the Palace of Itza and Act II in Hollywood. The plot concerns a motion picture company that invades the territory of Itza hoping to get some photos of castles, Kings, and the like. Princess Sylvia falls in love with Harry Vance (Alan Edwards), the director, which slows matters up a little but not much.

== Songs ==
Act 1
- “The Americans Are Here”
- “(My) Orange Blossom Home”
- “Lady Luck”
- “Maybe This Is Love”†
- “It’s an Old Spanish Custom”
- “Pompanola”†
- “Because You’re Beautiful”
- “Bobby and Me”

† By DeSylva, Brown & Henderson

Act 2
- “The Silver Tree”
- “Gee, But It’s Great to Be Alive”
- “Look Pleasant”
- “Two Boys”
- “Let’s All Sing the Lard Song”††
- “Putting on the Ritz”
- “Happy Hoboes”
- “Bride Bells”

†† Music by Leslie Sarony
