= They Go Boom! =

1929 film

They Go Boom
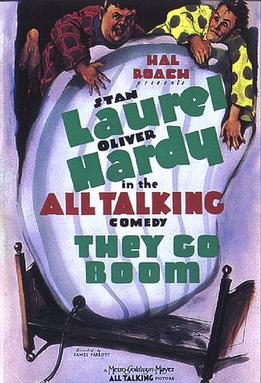
- Theatrical release poster
- Directed by: James Parrott
- Written by: Leo McCarey (story); H. M. Walker
- Produced by: Hal Roach
- Starring: Stan Laurel; Oliver Hardy; Charlie Hall; Sam Lufkin
- Cinematography: Art Lloyd; George Stevens
- Edited by: Richard C. Currier
- Music by: William Axt; S. Williams
- Distributed by: Metro-Goldwyn-Mayer
- Release date: September 21, 1929
- Running time: 20:16
- Country: United States
- Language: English

They Go Boom is a 1929 short comedy film directed by James Parrott and starring Laurel and Hardy.

== Plot ==
Laurel and Hardy find themselves in a rented room, attempting to rest for the night. However, their efforts are thwarted by Hardy's persistent sneezing due to a cold and Laurel's disruptive snoring, leading to mutual insomnia. Despite their endeavors to alleviate these disturbances, their attempts only exacerbate the situation, culminating in disorder and disarray.

Their troubles escalate when the irate owner of the room threatens eviction due to the commotion. Upon returning to their quarters, a mishap occurs as their air mattress is inadvertently filled with gas, causing it to expand uncontrollably until they are pressed against the ceiling. As they grapple with the dire predicament, panic ensues, further compounded when Hardy's sneeze triggers the mattress to explode.

The commotion attracts the attention of the hotel owner and law enforcement authorities, who enter the room just as Hardy's sneeze causes the ceiling to collapse, adding to the chaos and calamity.

== Cast ==
- Stan Laurel as Stan
- Oliver Hardy as Ollie

Uncredited

- Charlie Hall as Landlord
- Sam Lufkin as Policeman

== Production ==
Typical of early talkies, the film has no musical score but makes effective use of sound effects. There is only music at the beginning and end of the film, the opening titles utilising the song "Runnin' Wild".
