= Danger! Women at Work =

1943 film directed by Sam Newfield

- Theatrical release poster
- Directed by: Sam Newfield
- Screenplay by: Martin Mooney
- Story by: Gertrude Walker; Edgar G. Ulmer
- Produced by: Jack Schwarz
- Starring: Patsy Kelly; Mary Brian; Isabel Jewell; Wanda McKay; Betty Compson; Cobina Wright Sr.
- Cinematography: Ira H. Morgan
- Edited by: Robert O. Crandall
- Production company: Producers Releasing Corporation
- Distributed by: Producers Releasing Corporation
- Release date: August 23, 1943
- Running time: 59 minutes
- Country: United States
- Language: English

Danger! Women at Work is a 1943 American comedy film directed by Sam Newfield and written by Martin Mooney. The film stars Patsy Kelly, Mary Brian, Isabel Jewell, Wanda McKay, Betty Compson and Cobina Wright Sr.. The film was released on August 23, 1943, by Producers Releasing Corporation.

== Plot ==
Pert and Marie are gas station attendants and Terry drives a cab, all doing their part for the war effort. Terry inherits a bungalow in Glendale and a 10-ton truck from her recently deceased Uncle Joe, and is at her wits' end as to what to do with the rig. Terry and Pert are advised to go into the trucking business by Pert's boyfriend, Danny. The girls are soon approached by someone named Benny from the finance company who threatens to repossess the truck if the mortgage on it isn't settled. Danny introduces the girls to his boss and he agrees to pay them $100 if they bring back a load of nitroglycerin back from Las Vegas, but they need to carry cargo there in order for them to travel legally on the highways, so they advertise. They are then visited by a smooth operator named Duke Edwards who promises them $125 to drive a load of furniture to Las Vegas in time for the opening of a gambling casino. They take up the offer and hit the road, but not before Terry gets her driver's license and then a trucking license with her fiancé, Pete, who is also a trucker.

Along the way to Vegas, they pick up several hitchhikers: a rich society matron named Regina with amnesia, Madame Sappho the Fortune-Teller, and a young woman named Doris Bendix, the daughter of a millionaire, who is running away from a family who wants her to marry a rich engineer, despite her considerations. Before crossing the Nevada border, a motorcycle patrolman warns them that they cannot drive at night in that area, and that they must stay at the motel up the road for the night. Once at the motel, they find themselves a couple of seedy characters in the lounge and play a round of craps with them. Terry wins big, and claims they never played a game of craps in their entire lives. The losing gamblers overhear on the radio about Miss Bendix and the $5000 reward for her location. Sam, the bellboy at the motel, points her photo out in a newspaper to them. Meanwhile, Regina's husband, Mr. North (a rich rancher and former senator), is trying to locate his wife. He asks the motel manager about her, and is told she had just left with several other girls in a truck.

The women all later end up in jail after the gamblers send out a warrant. Pete and Danny rush to Nevada to provide any help they can. Terry explains everything that occurred to Judge Higginbottom, clears everything up, and he lets them off. He also ends up marrying Terry and Pete, Pert and Danny, and Doris and her chosen fiancé, Tommy. Terry smashes a vase over Regina's head, and she regains her memory, reuniting with her husband.

== Cast ==
- Patsy Kelly as Terry Olsen
- Mary Brian as Pert
- Isabel Jewell as Marie
- Wanda McKay as Doris Bendix
- Betty Compson as Madame Sappho
- Cobina Wright Sr. as Regina
- Jack Randall as Danny
- Warren Hymer as Pete
- Vince Barnett as Benny
- Michael Kirk as Tommy

== Additional info ==
This was Patsy Kelly's last starring role in a motion picture. Though endeared by the public, she was soon after blackballed by the major studios in Hollywood for her refusal to discontinue her homosexual activity off-camera. She paid the bills over the next decade or so by appearing on radio, TV game shows, the occasional teleplay, and "working" as a domestic for Tallulah Bankhead. She did not appear in another film for seventeen years, until Please Don't Eat the Daisies in 1960, and from thereafter appeared in only supporting roles.
