= Kelly the Second =

1936 film by Gus Meins

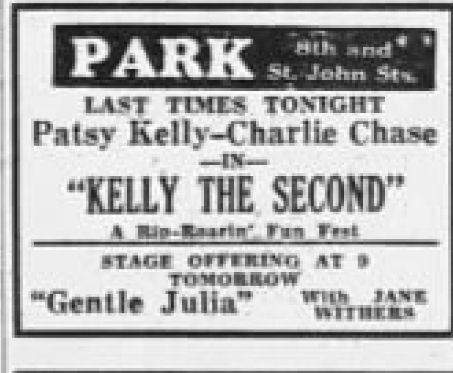
- Newspaper advertisement
- Directed by: Gus Meins
- Written by: Jack Jevne (adaptation); Gordon Douglas (adaptation); Tom Bell (dialogue); Arthur V. Jones (dialogue)
- Screenplay by: Jefferson Moffitt; William Terhune
- Produced by: Hal Roach
- Starring: Patsy Kelly; Guinn Williams; Charley Chase
- Cinematography: Art Lloyd
- Edited by: Jack Ogilvie
- Music by: Marvin Hatley
- Production company: Hal Roach Studios
- Distributed by: Metro-Goldwyn-Mayer
- Release date: August 21, 1936
- Running time: 70 minutes
- Country: United States
- Language: English

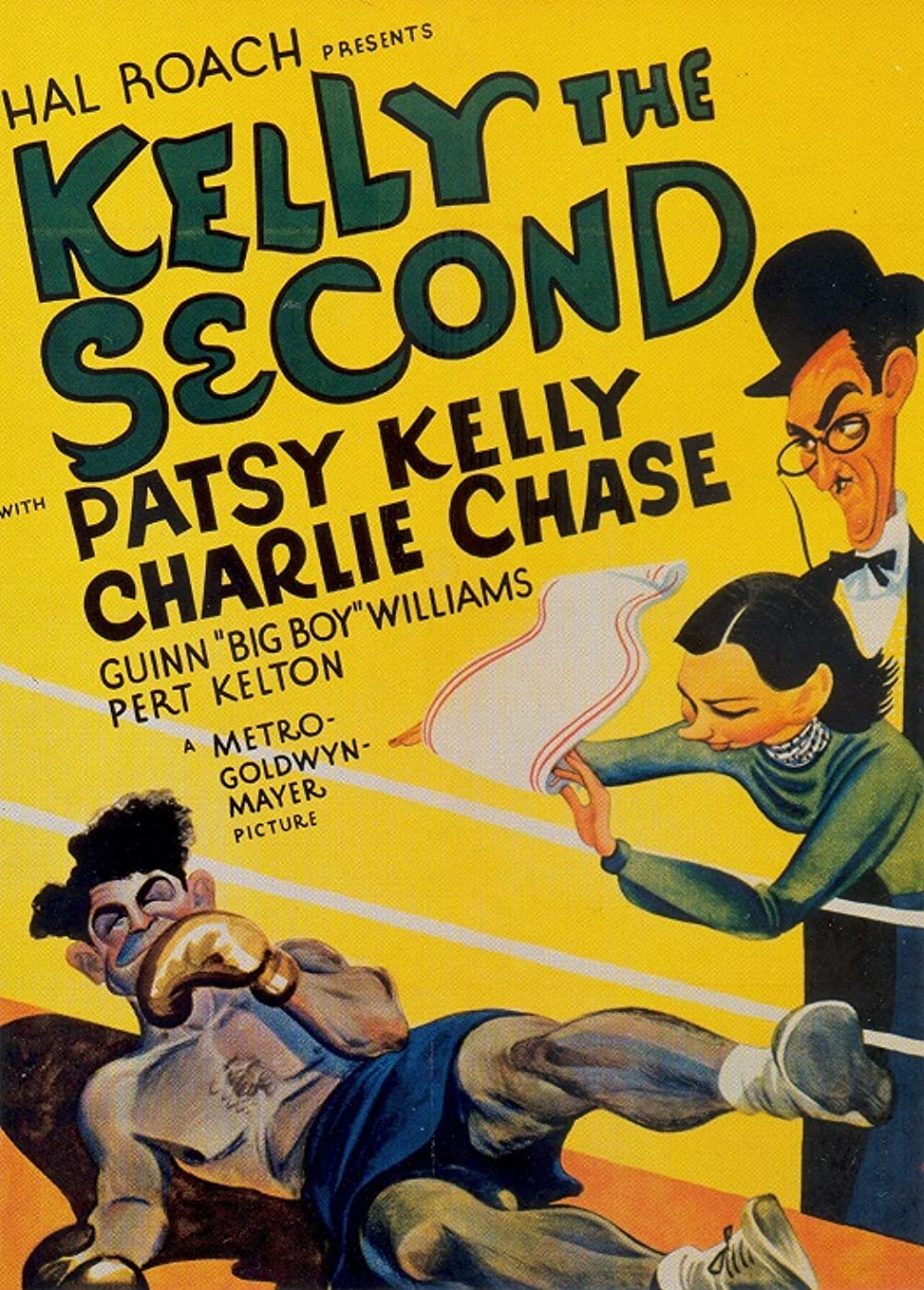
Kelly the Second (1936)

Kelly the Second is a 1936 American romantic comedy film directed by Gus Meins and starring Patsy Kelly, Guinn Williams, and Charley Chase. This Hal Roach studio film was distributed by Metro-Goldwyn-Mayer. The title is a pun, "Second" referring not to lineage but a boxer's corner man (or woman in this case).

It was Chase's final feature as well as his last film for Roach after a 15-year run at the studio; Roach was phasing out short subjects and didn't feel Chase could carry a feature, so he was let go.

== Plot ==
After a traffic incident culminating in a brawl, feisty Molly Kelly (Kelly) comes up with the idea of making truck driver Cecil Callahan (Williams) a professional boxer, aided by her boss Doc Klum (Chase). Complications arise when mobster Ike Arnold (Brophy), impressed by Cecil's punching, declares himself a partner, putting additional pressure on him to win. Further muddying the waters is Ike's girl friend Gloria (Kelton), who's set her sights on Cecil, much to Molly's dismay.

Note: The gag of Cecil becoming enraged when he hears The Irish Washerwoman was recycled from The Three Stooges' short Punch Drunks, though in that case the song was Pop Goes the Weasel.

== Cast ==
- Patsy Kelly as Molly Kelly
- Guinn Williams as Cecil Callahan
- Charley Chase as Doc Klum
- Pert Kelton as Gloria
- Edward Brophy as Ike Arnold
- Harold Huber as Spike
- Maxie Rosenbloom as Butch Flynn
- DeWitt C. Jennings as Judge
- Syd Saylor as Dan

Many of Roach's contract players appear in uncredited bits, including Carl "Alfalfa" Switzer, Max Davidson, Charlie Hall, Harry Bernard and James C. Morton.
