= An All-American Toothache =

1936 film

- Directed by: Gus Meins
- Produced by: Hal Roach
- Starring: Thelma Todd; Patsy Kelly
- Cinematography: Art Lloyd
- Edited by: Jack Ogilvie
- Music by: Leroy Shield
- Distributed by: Metro-Goldwyn-Mayer
- Release date: January 25, 1936
- Running time: 20 min
- Country: United States
- Language: English

An All-American Toothache is a 1936 American comedy short released by Metro-Goldwyn-Mayer, produced by Hal Roach and directed by Gus Meins, and starring Thelma Todd and Patsy Kelly. It is the 21st and last entry in the Todd and Kelly series, which came to an end upon Todd's death in December 1935.

== Cast ==
- Thelma Todd as Thelma Alice Todd
- Patsy Kelly as Patricia Veronica Kelly
- Mickey Daniels as Elmer
- Duke York as Coach Bill
- Johnny Arthur as The Dental Professor
- Bud Jamison as 2nd Plumber
- Billy Bletcher as 1st Plumber
- Si Jenks as Janitor

== Synopsis ==
Thelma creates a fake toothache for Patsy whose coveted tooth might help Elmira win the big game.
