= Slightly Static =

- Directed by: William Terhune
- Produced by: Hal Roach
- Cinematography: Hap Depew
- Edited by: Ray Snyder
- Music by: Leroy Shield
- Distributed by: Metro-Goldwyn-Mayer
- Release date: September 7, 1935
- Running time: 19 minutes
- Country: United States
- Language: English

Slightly Static is a 1935 American short comedy film directed by William H. Terhune. It was the debut film of Roy Rogers who performed with the Sons of the Pioneers although his name was uncredited. It is the 17th entry in the series.

== Cast ==
- Thelma Todd... Thelma
- Patsy Kelly ... Patsy
- Harold Waldridge ... Mr. Campbell's Son, Elmer
- Dell Henderson ... Mr. Campbell (as Del Henderson)
- The Randall Sisters ... Vocal Trio (as Randall Sisters)
- Sons of the Pioneers ... Male Singers
