= The Hit Parade (film) =

1937 film by Gus Meins

- Directed by: Gus Meins
- Screenplay by: Bradford Ropes; Samuel Ornitz; Harry Ruskin
- Story by: Bradford Ropes
- Produced by: Nat Levine
- Starring: Frances Langford; Phil Regan; Max Terhune; Edward Brophy; Louise Henry; Pert Kelton
- Cinematography: Ernest Miller
- Edited by: Ernest J. Nims; Lester Orlebeck
- Music by: Alberto Colombo
- Production company: Republic Pictures
- Distributed by: Republic Pictures
- Release date: April 26, 1937
- Running time: 83 minutes
- Country: United States
- Language: English

The Hit Parade is a 1937 American musical film directed by Gus Meins and written by Bradford Ropes, Samuel Ornitz and Harry Ruskin. The film stars Frances Langford, Phil Regan, Max Terhune, Edward Brophy, Louise Henry and Pert Kelton. The film was released on April 26, 1937, by Republic Pictures. Republic later reissued the film in 67 minute length as I'll Reach for a Star.

== Plot ==
Pete Garland gets fired by singer Monica Barrett, and out of spite finds Ruth Allison and decides to make her a star, he succeeds, but Ruth has some dark secrets.

== Cast ==
- Frances Langford as Ruth Allison
- Phil Regan as Pete Garland
- Max Terhune as Rusty Callahan
- Edward Brophy as Mulrooney
- Louise Henry as Monica Barrett
- Pert Kelton as Eadie White
- Pierre Watkin as J. B. Hawley
- J. Farrell MacDonald as Sgt. O'Hara
- Monroe Owsley as Teddy Leeds
- Inez Courtney as Tillie
- William Demarest as Parole Officer
- George Givot as Herman
- Sammy White as Dancer
- Paul Garner as Member, The Gentle Maniacs
- Sam Wolfe as Member, The Gentle Maniacs
- Richard Hakins as Member, The Gentle Maniacs
- Yvonne Manoff as Member, The Tic Toc Girls
- Mildred Winston as Member, The Tic Toc Girls
- Barbara Johnston as Member, The Tic Toc Girls
- Carl Hoff as Bandleader of 'The Hit Parade Orchester'
- Ivie Anderson as Ivy
- Duke Ellington as Duke Ellington
- Eddy Duchin as Eddy Duchin
- Pat Padgett as Pat of Pick and Pat / Molasses of Molasses and January
- Pick Malone as Pick of Pick and Pat / January of Molasses and January
- Al Pearce as Al Pearce
- Sayle Taylor as The Voice of Experience
- Ed Thorgersen as Ed Thorgersen
- Ed 'Oscar' Platt as Oscar
- Lou Fulton as Elmer
- Arlene Harris as Arlene 'Chatterbox' Harris
- Stanley Fields as Bedtime Story Man

== Soundtrack ==
- Happy Days Are Here Again

Music by Milton Ager
Lyrics by Jack Yellen
Performed by Carl Hoff & The Hit Parade Orchestra

- I've Got to Be a Rug Cutter

Written by Duke Ellington Performed by Ivie Anderson and the Duke Ellington Orchestra

- If It Wasn't for Pete

Music by Sam H. Stept
Lyrics by Ned Washington
Sung by Sammy White
Danced by Sammy White with chorus

- The Glory Beyond

Music by Alberto Colombo
Danced by Frances Langford and Pert Kelton

- I'll Reach for a Star

Music by Lou Handman
Lyrics by Walter Hirsch
Sung by Frances Langford

- Sweet Heartache

Music by Sam H. Stept
Lyrics by Ned Washington
Sung by Phil Regan
Reprised by Frances Langford

- Last Night I Dreamed of You

Music by Lou Handman
Lyrics by Walter Hirsch
Sung by Frances Langford

- Geschichten aus dem Wienerwald/Wiener Blut - Medley

Music by Johann Strauss
Arranged by Eddy Duchin
played by Eddy Duchin and His Orchestra
Danced by Galante and Leonarda

- Was It Rain?

Music by Lou Handman
Lyrics by Walter Hirsch
Sung by Frances Langford

- Love Is Good for Anything That Ails You

Written by Cliff Friend and Matty Malneck
Performed by the Tic-Toc Girls, Duke Ellington Orchestra, Eddy Duchin & His Orchestra and Carl Hoff & The Hit Parade Orchestra with chorus

- Sweet Heartache

Music by Sam H. Stept
Lyrics by Ned Washington
Sung by Phil Regan and Frances Langford

- Hail Alma Mater

Music by Sam H. Stept
