= Tom Francis =

English footballer (1920–1996)

Personal information
- Full name: Thomas George Francis
- Date of birth: 20 October 1920
- Place of birth: Bermondsey, England
- Date of death: April 1996 (aged 75)
- Place of death: Lambeth, England
- Position: Goalkeeper

Senior career*
Years	Team	Apps	(Gls)
1938–1946	Cheltenham Town		
1946–1947	Millwall	1	(0)
1947–1949	Chelmsford City	27	(0)
- Tunbridge Wells United
- * Club domestic league appearances and goals

Thomas George Francis (20 October 1920 – April 1996) was an English footballer who played as a goalkeeper.

== Career ==
Francis began his career with non-league club Cheltenham Town in 1938, however Francis' time at Cheltenham was interrupted by World War II. In 1946, Francis signed for Millwall, making a single Football League appearance during his time at the club. In 1947, Francis joined Chelmsford City. In the 1948–1949 season, Francis temporarily lost his place to Lew Collins, regaining it back for an FA Cup tie away to Guildford City on 13 November 1948. Francis left Chelmsford in 1949. Francis later played for Tunbridge Wells United.
