= Lyda Roberti =

American actress

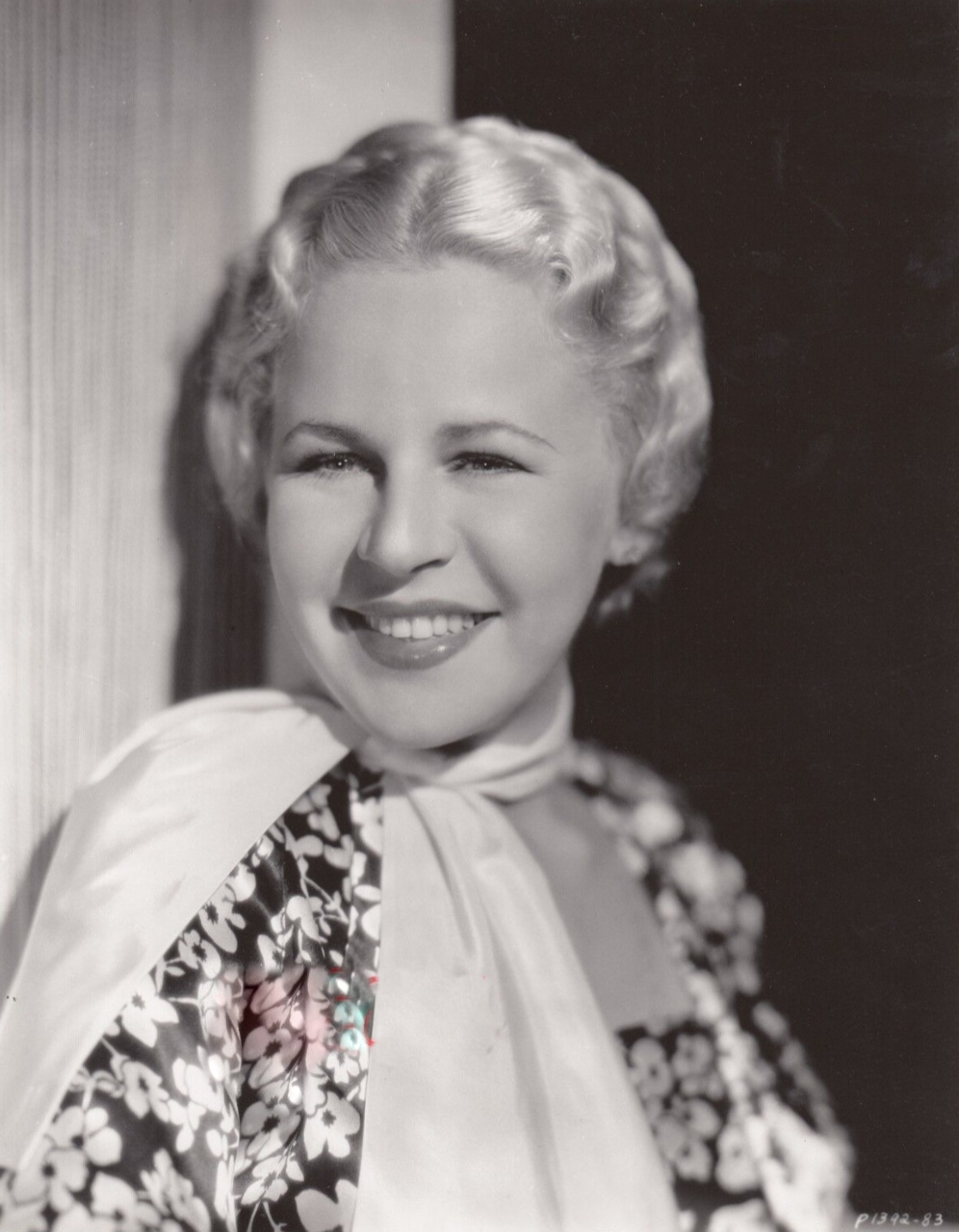
- Roberti in 1934
- Born: Lyda Pecjak; May 20, 1906; Warsaw, Kingdom of Poland, Russian Empire (present-day Warsaw, Poland)
- Died: March 13, 1938 (aged 31); Glendale, California, U.S.
- Resting place: Forest Lawn Memorial Park, Glendale, California
- Occupations: Actress, singer
- Years active: 1928–1938
- Spouse: Bud Ernst (m. 1935)

Lyda Roberti (née Pecjak; May 20, 1906 – March 13, 1938) was an American singer and stage and film actress. (According to the opening credits of "The Big Broadcast of 1936," Lyda is pronounced LEE-duh.)

== Early years ==
Born in Warsaw, then part of Imperial Russia, Lyda Roberti was the daughter of a German father (a professional clown surnamed Pecjak) and a Polish mother. As a child she performed in the circus as a trapeze artist and bareback rider. She had an elder brother, Robert, also born in Poland, and a younger sister, Manya.

To escape the upheaval in Russia after the Communist revolution in 1917, the Pecjak family settled in Shanghai, China, where Lyda earned money as a dancer in the Carlton café. Eventually, she saved enough money to pay her passage to the United States, where she performed in vaudeville in both San Francisco and Los Angeles.

== Career ==
Roberti made her Broadway debut in You Said It in 1931 and, with its success, became an overnight sensation. During her run with the show, she was nicknamed "Broadway's preferred Polish blonde". Historian Edward Jablonski found that "much of her appeal to the audiences at the time was due to her Polish accent" and cited instances when her pronunciation of certain consonants would "stir audiences to gales of laughter."

In 1932, she was signed to Paramount Pictures, where she appeared in Edward F. Cline's comedy film Million Dollar Legs (1932) as "Mata Machree, The Woman No Man Can Resist", a Mata Hari-type spy hired to undermine the President of Klopstokia (played by W.C. Fields) in his efforts to secure money for his destitute country.

In 1933, she performed in two more Broadway musicals: the short-lived Pardon My English and the much more successful Roberta. Throughout the 1930s, she played in a string of films. Her sexy but playful characterizations, along with the accent she had acquired during her years in Europe and Asia, made her popular with audiences. In 1936, Roberti replaced Thelma Todd in several films after Todd's death.

== Personal life ==
On June 25, 1935, Roberti married aviator Bud Ernst in Yuma, Arizona. They separated one year later but secretly reconciled in January 1937 and remained together until her death.

Roberti struggled with health issues for most of her life, mainly related to her heart. In the spring of 1935, she underwent surgery for heart and appendix issues. In 1936, she was forced to withdraw from Wives Never Know owing to an unnamed illness. A series of heart attacks forced her to curtail her workload in 1937.

== Death ==
On the night of March 13, 1938, Roberti suffered another severe heart attack. Dr. Myron Babcock unsuccessfully administered heart stimulants, and Roberti died at age 31 with husband Ernst at her bedside. Her funeral two days later drew 400 people, including many of her Hollywood colleagues.

According to her friend and co-star Patsy Kelly, Roberti died from a heart attack while bending to tie her shoelace. In an interview with Leonard Maltin for Film Fan Monthly, Kelly said, "As a child, her father was in the circus, and he used to throw her on bareback, and we never knew it had affected her heart, and one day – boom!"

Roberti is interred in the Forest Lawn Memorial Park Cemetery in Glendale, California.

== Filmography ==
Year	Title	Role	Notes
1928	Undersea Revue		Short
1932	Dancers in the Dark	Fanny Zabowolski	
1932	Million Dollar Legs	Mata Machree	
1932	The Kid from Spain	Rosalie	
1933	Three-Cornered Moon	Jenny	
1933	Torch Singer	Dora Nichols	
1933	Meet the Baron	College Girl	Uncredited
1934	College Rhythm	Mimi	
1934	Hollywood Rhythm	Herself	Short
1935	George White's 1935 Scandals	Manya	
1935	The Big Broadcast of 1936	Countess Ysobel de Naigila	
1936	At Sea Ashore	Herself	Short
1936	Hill-Tillies	Herself	Short
1937	Nobody's Baby	Lena Marchetti	
1937	Pick a Star	Dagmar	
1938	Wide Open Faces	Kitty Fredericks	(final film role)
