= Million Dollar Legs (1932 film) =

1932 film

- promotional poster
- Directed by: Edward F. Cline
- Written by: Nicholas T. Barrows; Joseph L. Mankiewicz
- Produced by: Herman J. Mankiewicz; B. P. Schulberg
- Starring: Jack Oakie; W. C. Fields; Ben Turpin; Lyda Roberti; George Barbier; Andy Clyde; Hank Mann
- Cinematography: Arthur L. Todd
- Music by: Rudolph G. Kopp (uncredited); John Leipold (uncredited)
- Distributed by: Paramount Pictures
- Release date: July 8, 1932
- Running time: 64 minutes
- Country: United States
- Language: English

Million Dollar Legs is a 1932 American pre-Code comedy film starring Jack Oakie and W.C. Fields, directed by Edward F. Cline, produced by Herman J. Mankiewicz (co-writer of Citizen Kane) and B.P. Schulberg, co-written by Joseph L. Mankiewicz, and released by Paramount Pictures. The film was inspired by the 1932 Summer Olympics, held in Los Angeles, California.

== Plot ==
While visiting the mythical country of Klopstokia on business, brush salesman Migg Tweeny collides with a young woman on the street and the two fall instantly in love. Her name is Angela—all the women in Klopstokia are named Angela, and the men are named George—and she is the daughter of Klopstokia's president, whose country is bankrupt, and who relies upon his great physical strength to dominate a cabinet that is conspiring to overthrow him. Tweeny, hoping to win the hand of the president's daughter in marriage, presents him with a plan to remedy Klopstokia's financial woes: The president is to enter the 1932 Summer Olympics, win the weightlifting competition, and collect a large cash reward that has been offered to medalists by Tweeny's employer. Tweeny then sets out to find athletes to make up Klopstokia's Olympic team, and quickly discovers that the country abounds in athletes of exceptional abilities. The team, with Tweeny as their trainer, boards a steamship bound for America.

Meanwhile, the rebellious cabinet ministers, who are determined to sabotage Klopstokia's Olympic bid, have enlisted the services of "Mata Machree, the Woman No Man Can Resist", a Mata Hari-based spy character who sets out to destroy the Klopstokian team's morale by seducing each athlete and then setting them against each other in a collective brawl. Her efforts have the intended effect: When the team arrives in Los Angeles, it is in no condition to compete. After a pep talk from Tweeny fails to inspire them, Angela tracks down Mata, defeats her in an underwater fight, and forces a confession from her before the assembled team, which restores the athletes' fighting spirit. They take to the field and begin winning events.

By the time the weightlifting competition begins, Klopstokia needs only three more points for victory. In the film's final scene, Tweeny excites the president's fierce temper in order to inspire him to a final superhuman effort. The president throws a 1,000-lb weight at Tweeny, missing him, but winning both the weightlifting competition and the shot put for Klopstokia.

== Cast ==
- Jack Oakie as Migg Tweeny
- W.C. Fields as the President
- Ben Turpin as Mysterious Man
- Lyda Roberti as Mata Machree
- George Barbier as Mr. Baldwin
- Andy Clyde as the Major-Domo
- Hank Mann as a Customs Inspector
- Susan Fleming as Angela
- Hugh Herbert as Secretary of the Treasury
- Irving Bacon as Secretary of War (uncredited)
- Dickie Moore as Willie - Angela's brother
- Ben Taggart as the Ship Captain (uncredited)
- Billy Gilbert as sneezing cabinet minister (uncredited)

== Reviews ==
In 1932, The New York Times' reviewer described the film as "a hopefully mad sort of picture ... where a series of comedians conducted themselves with a total lack of dignity."

After a June 2010 screening in Tribeca, The New Yorker writer David Denby described the film's odd, fragmented structure as well as its overall surreal tone:

Million Dollar Legs...is about as close as Hollywood (in this case, Paramount) ever came to the spirit of Dada. The movie is so silly that it seems both artless and weirdly avant-garde, a style that the studios never quite explored again. Sequences begin and end abruptly; lovers talk parodistic nonsense to each other; Lyda Roberti, a comic dancer and singer with a delicious pan-European accent and alarmingly active hips (she makes Kim Cattrall look inhibited), turns up as a femme fatale, apparently based on Marlene Dietrich. The film bears some resemblance to the Marx Brothers' manic Duck Soup, which came out the following year and is actually more disciplined.

Critic Pauline Kael named Million Dollar Legs as one of her favorite films, calling it a "lunatic musical satire".

== See also ==
- List of films about the sport of athletics
