= Pert Kelton =

American actress (1907–1968)

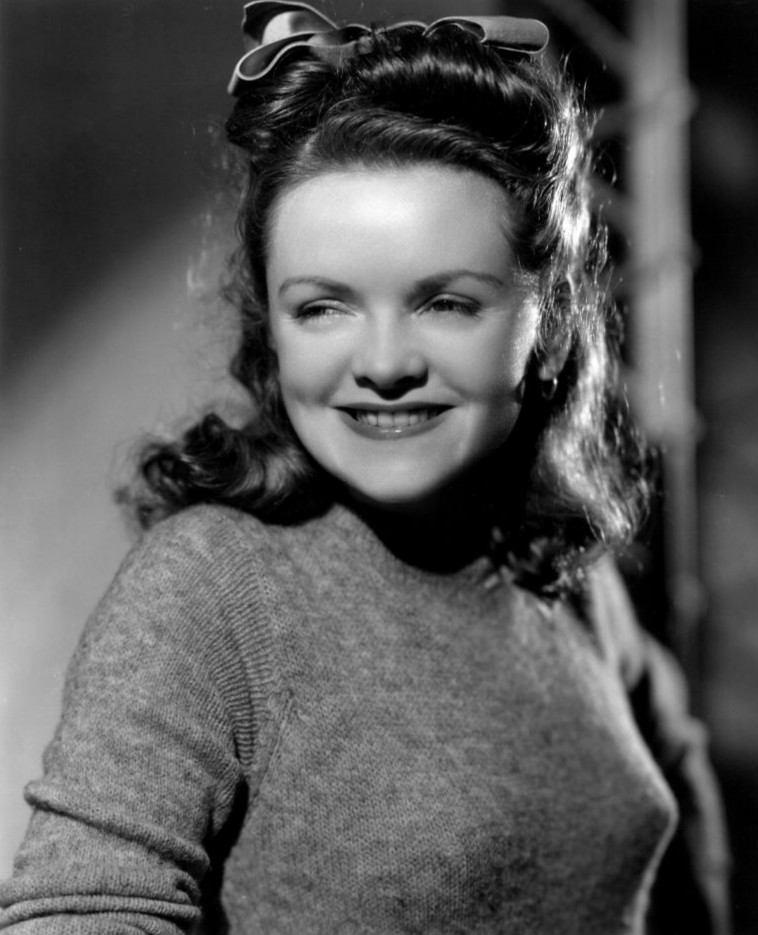
- Kelton in 1942
- Born: October 14, 1907; Great Falls, Montana, U.S.
- Died: October 30, 1968 (aged 61); Ridgewood, New Jersey, U.S.
- Occupation: Actress
- Years active: 1925 (professionally) –1968
- Spouse: Ralph Bell (19??-1968; her death)
- Children: 2

Pert L. Kelton (October 14, 1907 – October 30, 1968) was an American stage, movie, radio, and television actress. She was the original Alice Kramden in The Honeymooners with Jackie Gleason. During the 1930s, she was a prominent comedic supporting and leading actress in Hollywood films such as Gregory La Cava's Bed of Roses with Constance Bennett and Raoul Walsh's The Bowery with Wallace Beery and George Raft (both released in 1933). She performed in a dozen Broadway productions between 1925 and 1968. She is probably best known for creating the role of Mrs. Paroo in the original 1957 Broadway production of the musical The Music Man, which she reprised in the 1962 movie adaptation. In the early 1950s, her career was interrupted as a result of Hollywood blacklisting, leading to her departure from The Honeymooners.

== Early life ==
Pert L. Kelton was born in 1907 in Great Falls, Montana. Her mother, Sue Kelton, was a native of Canada; her father, Edward Kelton, a native of California.

Kelton was reportedly named by her aunt, who suggested the name "Pert" to her mother after her favorite theatrical role, the character "Pert Barlow" in a play called Checkers.

In 1910, while accompanying her parents and sister on an overseas tour of shows, she debuted on stage at the age of three in Cape Town, Union of South Africa.

Upon her return to the United States with her family, Kelton was enrolled in private schools for her early formal education and for extensive training in dance, voice, and drama. By age 12, after appearing for a while with her parents as "The Three Keltons", she began appearing as a solo act or "single" in vaudeville; and by age 17 she was performing on Broadway, initially as a cast member in Jerome Kern's 1925 musical comedy Sunny, starring Marilyn Miller.

== Films ==
Kelton and her parents had moved to California to work in Hollywood films by the latter half of 1927. Her first credited movie role there was as Rosie in First National Pictures' 1929 release Sally, based on the Broadway hit by the same name. The federal census of 1930 showed that Kelton was living in Los Angeles at the Warner-Kelton Hotel – later called the Hotel Brevoort (and Tropical Gardens) – sharing room 666. That same census identifies all three of the Keltons as employed actors in "motion pictures".

Kelton was a young comedienne in A-list movies during the 1930s, often portraying the leading lady's wisecracking friend. She had a memorable turn in 1933 as dance hall singer "Trixie" in The Bowery alongside Wallace Beery, George Raft, Jackie Cooper, and Fay Wray. Directed by Raoul Walsh, the film is based on the story of Steve Brodie, the first man who reportedly jumped off the Brooklyn Bridge in 1886 and lived to brag about it. Kelton at one point in the film sings to a rowdy, appreciative crowd in an energetic dive, using a curious New York accent to good comedic effect, with Beery and Raft arguing afterwards over her attentions.

In Gregory LaCava's 1933 pre-Code comedy Bed of Roses, Kelton plays Minnie, a witty prostitute who is a partner in crime with Lorry, portrayed by Constance Bennett. The two women in the plot are fond of getting admiring men helplessly drunk before robbing them, at least until getting caught and tossed into jail. Kelton has all the best lines, surprisingly wicked and amusing observations that would never be allowed in an American film after the Hollywood Production Code was adopted. Nevertheless, in 1933 her performance in Bed of Roses was widely praised by critics in leading newspapers and trade papers.

Kelton for the remainder of the 1930s performed in over 20 more feature films and shorts. After her appearance in the 1939 film Whispering Enemies, she redirected her career, returning again to theatre and to performing increasingly on radio and later on the rapidly expanding medium of television. She did not return to the "big screen" until 1962, when she was cast as Mrs. Paroo in The Music Man.

== Radio and return to New York ==
By April 1940, Pert had left California and was living in New York City again, sharing a $65-per-month apartment in Manhattan on West 55th Street with three other women, two of whom were employed as dancers in the theatre and the third as a secretary. A federal census taker canvassing Manhattan that year concisely identified Kelton in his enumeration ledger as "Actress, Theatre & Movies" and recorded her given age as only 28, although in the spring of 1940 Kelton was actually 32 years old. If not a mistake in documentation, it is possible that Kelton herself, feeling the pressures to maintain a youthful profile within the image-conscious realm of entertainment, "shaved" a few years off her age when answering census questions at that time. Her documented lack of consistent employment during the previous year may be indicative too of the professional pressures she was experiencing after her film career in Hollywood began to wane in the late 1930s. According to the United States Census of 1940, Kelton was employed for only six weeks during the entire year of 1939, a total time of employment far less than the weeks worked by her roommates over the same period.

Once Kelton had resettled in New York during the early 1940s, she began to work in theatre again, and she became a familiar voice on radio as well, performing on programs such as Easy Aces, It's Always Albert, The Stu Erwin Show, and on the 1941 soap opera We Are Always Young. Later, In 1949, she did the voices of five different radio characters on The Milton Berle Show. She was also a regular cast member of The Henry Morgan Show; and in the early 1950s, she performed the role of the tart maid Agnes in the Monty Woolley vehicle The Magnificent Montague, along with reprising her Berle show role of Martha Harrison, who never said anything but "Yeeessss!" Martha inspired the Warner Brothers Looney Tunes character Miss Prissy, a dowdy white hen in a blue bonnet.

== Television ==
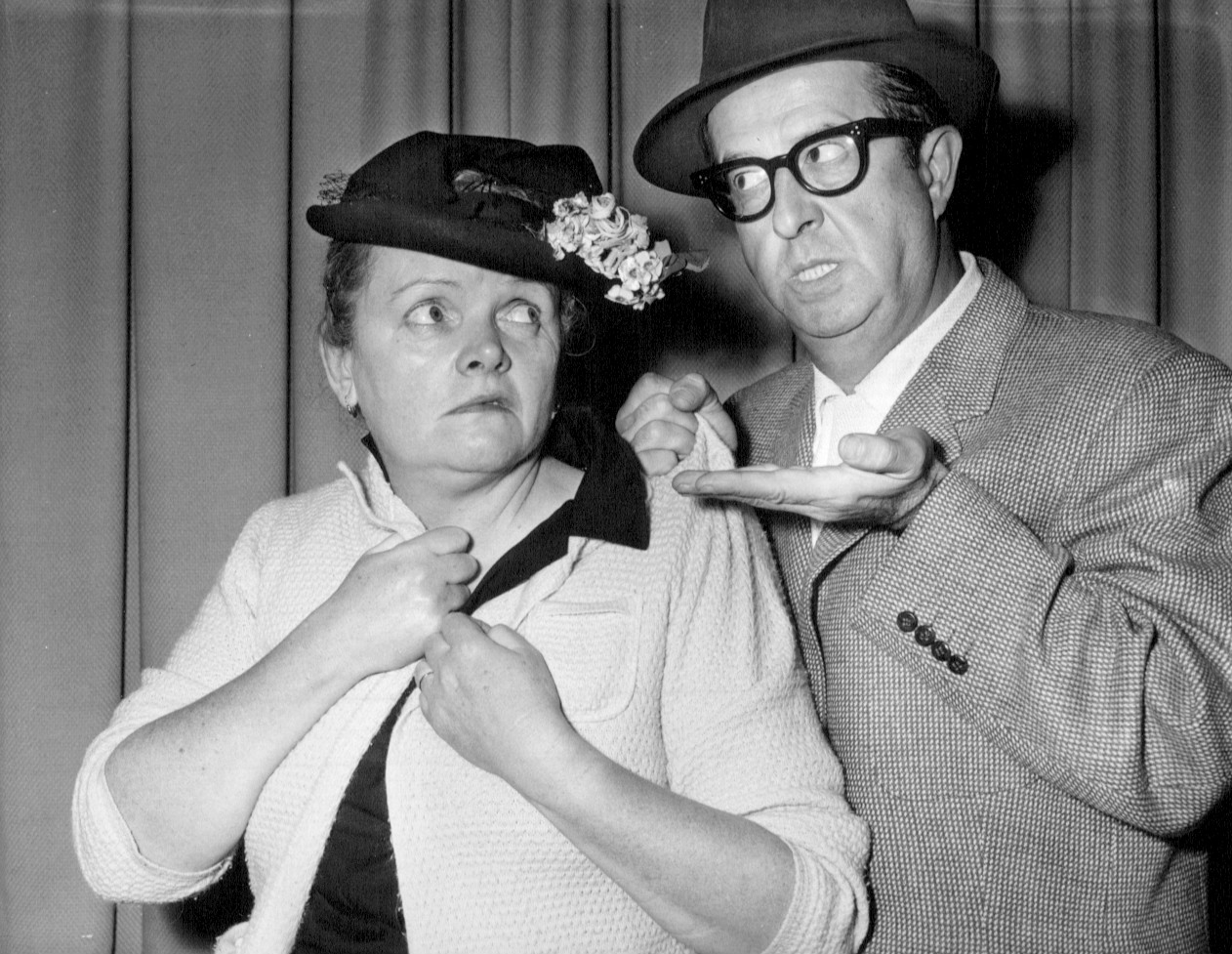
Kelton performing with Phil Silvers in a 1963 CBS comedy special

Kelton appeared in Henry Morgan's Great Talent Hunt, first aired January 26, 1951, hosted by Henry Morgan, and with Kaye Ballard, Art Carney, and Arnold Stang.

Kelton was the original Alice Kramden in The Honeymooners comedy sketches on the DuMont Television Network's Cavalcade of Stars. These sketches formed the eventual basis for the 1955 sitcom The Honeymooners. Jackie Gleason starred as her husband Ralph Kramden, and Art Carney as their upstairs neighbor Ed Norton. Elaine Stritch played Trixie, the burlesque dancer wife of Norton, for one sketch before being replaced by Joyce Randolph.

Kelton appeared in the original sketches, generally running about 10 to 20 minutes, shorter than the later one-season half-hour series episodes and 1960s hour-long musical versions. However, she was abruptly dropped from her role due to being blacklisted and was replaced by Audrey Meadows. Rather than acknowledge that she was blacklisted, her producers explained that her departure was based on alleged heart problems. Kelton and her husband had been listed in Red Channels, an early 1950s publication of alleged communists or fellow travelers in the U.S. entertainment industry. Kelton sued the publication for libel, but later dropped the suit. In his book The Forgotten Network, David Weinstein wrote Kelton remained on Cavalcade of Stars through the final season of the series (1951–1952), and suggests that it may have been because Jackie Gleason had resisted attempts at having her dropped.

In the 1960s, Kelton was invited back to Gleason's CBS show to play Alice's mother in an episode of the hour-long musical version of The Honeymooners (also known as The Color Honeymooners), with Sheila MacRae as a fetching young Alice.

In 1963, Kelton appeared on The Twilight Zone, playing the overbearing mother of Robert Duvall in the episode "Miniature." The next year she guest-starred on the popular family sitcom My Three Sons. In this episode "Stage Door Bub", Kelton portrays Thelma Wilson, a veteran itinerant stage actress who longs for a settled domestic life but soon realizes that that lifestyle is actually ill-suited for her personality.

In her last years, Kelton was strongly identified with Spic and Span because of commercials for the product.

== Hotel owner ==
Pert Kelton was part owner of the Warner-Kelton Hotel, built in the late 1920s, at 6326 Lexington Avenue in Los Angeles. Kelton and her parents resided in the hotel during the late 1920s until at least 1930. (A February 20, 1928, article in the Standard-Examiner (Ogden, Utah) incorrectly identifies the hotel as the Walton-Kelton Hotel.) The hotel catered to actors, poets, and musicians, such as Cary Grant, Orry Kelly, Rodgers and Hart, Monroe Salisbury, Sadakichi Hartmann, and later, Elizabeth Short. The building had a small outdoor theater, in a garden to the south, with a wishing well that may have inspired the song "There's a Small Hotel" from the musical On Your Toes (1936). It also housed a speakeasy in the basement. A sign above the hotel entrance reads "Joyously Enter Here". It was later the home of the California Television Society.

== Personal life and death ==
When away from rehearsing and performing, Kelton enjoyed art as a pastime and became a "passionate" painter. She was married to actor-director Ralph S. Bell, with whom she had two sons, Brian and Stephen.

As resident of Washington Township, Bergen County, New Jersey, Kelton died of a heart attack on October 30, 1968, at age 61 while swimming at the YMCA in Ridgewood, New Jersey.

== Filmography ==
Features

- Sally (1929) as Rosie
- Hot Curves (1930) as Cookie
- Bed of Roses (1933) as Minnie Brown
- The Bowery (1933) as Trixie Odbray
- The Meanest Gal in Town (1934) as Lulu White
- Sing and Like It (1934) as Ruby
- Bachelor Bait (1934) as Allie Summers
- Pursued (1934) as Gilda (uncredited)
- Lightning Strikes Twice (1934) as Fay, the Fan Dancer
- Hooray for Love (1935) as Trixie Chummy
- Mary Burns, Fugitive (1935) as Goldie Gordon
- Annie Oakley (1935) as Vera Delmar
- Kelly the Second (1936) as Gloria
- Sitting on the Moon (1936) as Mattie
- Cain and Mabel (1936) as Toddy
- Laughing at Trouble (1936) as Ella McShane
- Women of Glamour (1937) as Nan LaRoque
- The Hit Parade (1937) as Eadie White
- Meet the Boyfriend (1937) as Beulah Potts
- You Can't Take It with You (1938) as Inmate (uncredited)
- Slander House (1938) as Mazie Mason
- Rhythm of the Saddle (1938) as Aunt Hattie
- Whispering Enemies (1939) as Virginia Daniels
- Hollywood Bound (1947), Edited from A Night at the Biltmore Bowl
- The Music Man (1962) as Mrs. Paroo
- Love and Kisses (1965) as Nanny
- The Comic (1969) as Mama Bell (posthumous release; final film role)

Short Subjects:

- Their Wives' Vacation (1930)
- Next Door Neighbors (1931) as Mrs. Green
- The Albany Branch (1931) as Pert Kelsey
- Signing 'em Up (1933) as Herself
- Screen Snapshots Series 14, No. 8 (1935)
- A Night at the Biltmore Bowl (1935) as Pert Kelton
- Pan Handlers (1936) as Pert
- Cinema Circus (1937) as Pert Kelton (uncredited)

== See also ==
- Pitts and Todd
