= Pick a Star =

1937 film by Edward Sedgwick

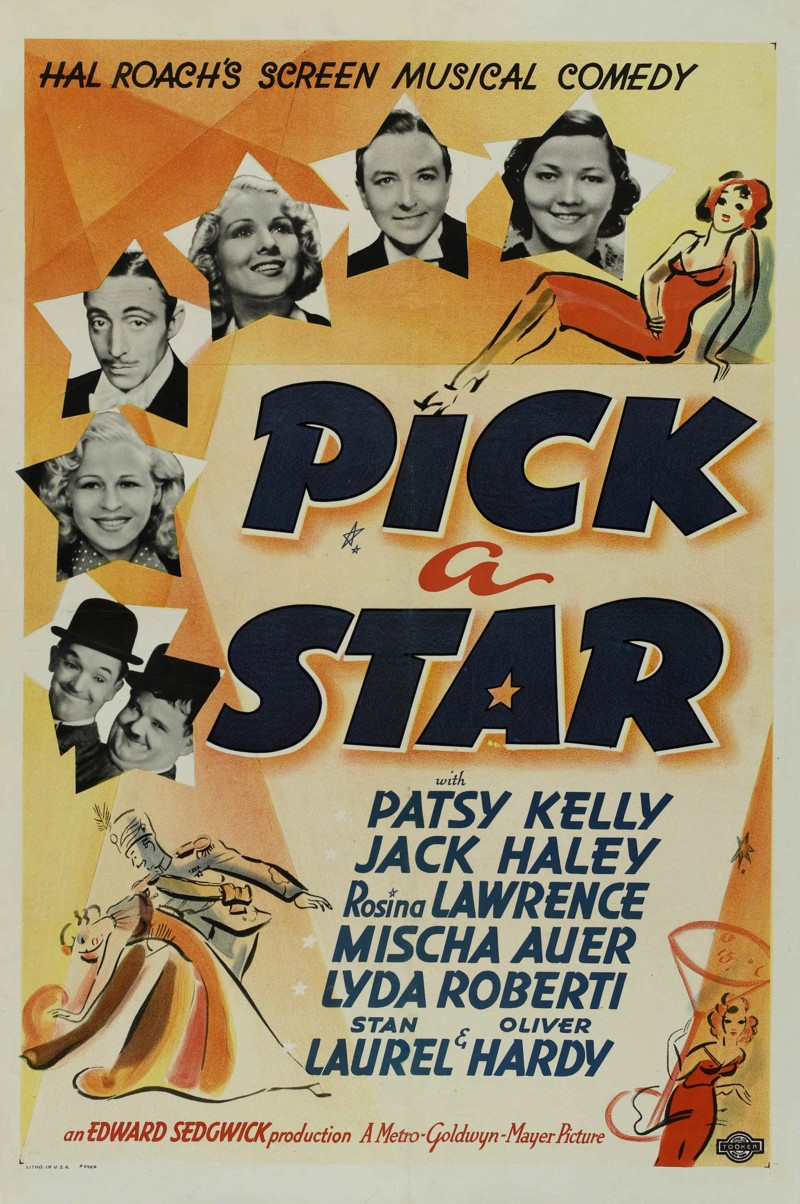
- Film poster
- Directed by: Edward Sedgwick
- Written by: Richard Flournoy; Arthur V. Jones; Thomas J. Dugan
- Produced by: Hal Roach
- Starring: Rosina Lawrence; Patsy Kelly; Jack Haley; Mischa Auer; Lyda Roberti
- Cinematography: Norbert Brodine; Art Lloyd
- Edited by: William H. Terhune
- Music by: Marvin Hatley
- Production company: Hal Roach Studios
- Distributed by: Metro-Goldwyn-Mayer
- Release date: May 21, 1937
- Running time: 76 minutes
- Country: United States
- Language: English

Pick a Star is a 1937 American musical comedy film starring Rosina Lawrence, Jack Haley, Patsy Kelly and Mischa Auer, directed by Edward Sedgwick, produced by Hal Roach and released through Metro-Goldwyn-Mayer, and filmed by Norbert Brodine. A reworking of Buster Keaton's first talkie, Free and Easy (1930), the film is mostly remembered today for two short scenes featuring Laurel and Hardy.

The film was reissued as Movie Struck by Astor Pictures in 1954.

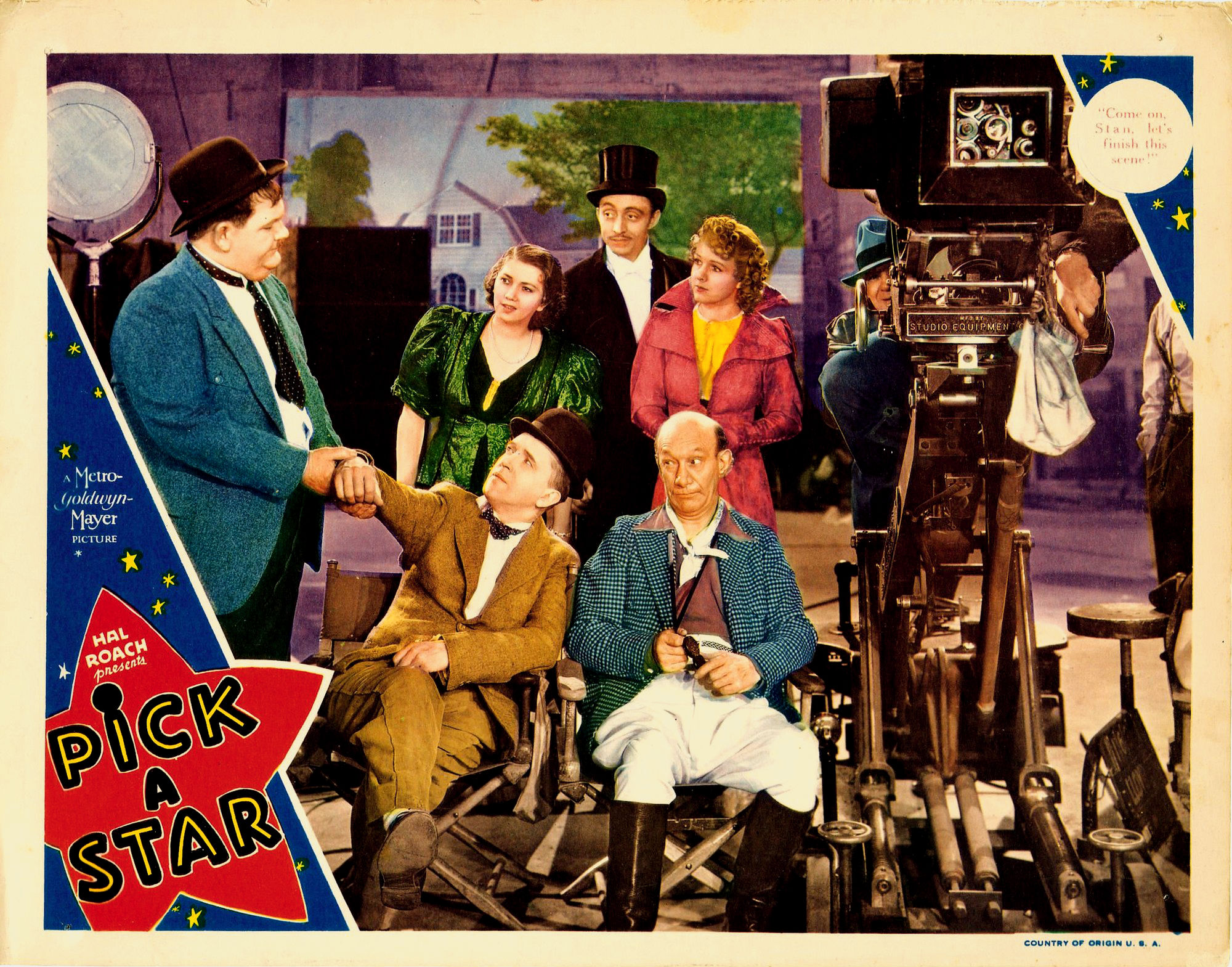
Lobby card for the film

== Plot ==
Cecelia enters a talent show in Waterloo, Kansas with the promise that the winner will be given a part in a movie. Cecilia wins but never receives her prize because the organizer has run off with the cash.

The emcee, Joe Jenkins, feels partly responsible for her disappointment and promises Cecilia that he will go to Hollywood to launch her career as a movie star. He sells his garage and moves to Hollywood, but is only able to find a job bussing tables at a local nightclub. He writes to Cecilia, however, that he has become a successful entertainer.

Cecilia has in the meantime crossed paths with Latin lover movie idol Rinaldo Lopez, who arrives in Waterloo when his plane makes an emergency landing there. Two of the other passengers give their plane tickets to Cecilia and her sister Nellie, who then accompany Rinaldo to Hollywood.

When she surprises Joe by showing up at the nightclub where he works Joe pretends that he is part of the floor show rather than just a busboy. The club owner exposes Joe as a busboy and fires him. Cecilia leaves with Rinaldo. Joe follows Cecilia as she leaves, and while standing in the street watching Cecilia depart in taxicab, he is hit by studio mogul Mr. Klawheimer's limosine. Mr. Klawheimer gives Joe a job as a studio driver in order to avoid a lawsuit.

Meanwhile Rinaldo takes the girls to the studio to watch musical star Dagmar shoot an elaborate scene modeled after the extravagant numbers shot by Busby Berkeley. Nellie wanders onto the set where Laurel and Hardy are filming a scene in a Mexican barroom, directed by James Finlayson. After watching them film a brawl, she asks the team whether they're afraid of hurting themselves. Hardy explains that the bottles they hit each other with are lightweight phonies and offer their heads in demonstration. Nellie is handed an actual liquor bottle by mistake and knocks the team out cold.

While Nellie is distracted Rinaldo invites Cecilia to his apartment. They are driven there by Joe, who sees what Rinaldo has in mind, and drives back to the studio to get Nellie after dropping Cecilia and Rinaldo off. While Joe and Nellie return, Cecilia is crying, prompting Nellie to knock Rinaldo out cold. Joe stays to revive Rinaldo when Cecilia and Nellie leave, and Rinaldo promises that he will try to get Cecilia a job in the movies.

Later Laurel and Hardy engage in a musical competition involving a trumpet and a tiny harmonica. When Hardy accidentally swallows the harmonica Laurel shows how to continue to play it by pressing the right spots on Hardy's belly.

Dagmar storms off the set in a fit of pique. A fed-up studio shoehorns Cecilia in her place and she makes good after Joe helps her overcome her stage fright during her screen test.

== Cast ==
- Patsy Kelly as Nellie Moore
- Jack Haley as Joe Jenkins
- Rosina Lawrence as Cecilia Moore
- Mischa Auer as Rinaldo Lopez
- Lyda Roberti as Dagmar
- Charles Halton as Mr. Klawheimer
- Tom Dugan as Dimitri Hogan
- Russell Hicks as Mr. Stone
- Cully Richards as Night club M.C.
- Spencer Charters as Judge
- Sam Adams as Sheriff
- Robert Gleckler as Head waiter
- Joyce Compton and Johnny Arthur as Newlyweds
- James Finlayson as Director
- Walter Long as Bandit--(last appearance with Laurel&Hardy)
- Wesley Barry as Assistant director
- Johnny Hyams as Mr. McGregor
- Leila McIntyre as Mrs. McGregor
- Stan Laurel and Oliver Hardy as Movie stars
- Felix Knight as Nightclub Singer (uncredited)

== See also ==
- Laurel and Hardy films
- Laurel and Hardy
- Stan Laurel
- Oliver Hardy
- James Finlayson
