= Broadway Limited (film) =

1941 film by Gordon Douglas

- Pictured: Victor McLaglen, Dennis O'Keefe, Marjorie Woodworth, Leonid Kinskey and ZaSu Pitts
- Directed by: Gordon Douglas
- Written by: Rian James (original screenplay)
- Produced by: Hal Roach (producer)
- Starring: Victor McLaglen; Dennis O'Keefe; ZaSu Pitts
- Cinematography: Henry Sharp
- Edited by: Bert Jordan
- Music by: Charles Previn
- Production company: Hal Roach Studios
- Distributed by: United Artists
- Release date: June 13, 1941
- Running time: 75 minutes
- Country: United States
- Language: English
- Budget: $500,000
- Box office: $257,305

Broadway Limited is a 1941 American comedy film directed by Gordon Douglas and starring Victor McLaglen, Dennis O'Keefe and ZaSu Pitts. The film takes its name from the Broadway Limited train that the Pennsylvania Railroad used to run between New York and Chicago.

== Plot ==
Movie director Ivan Ivanski (Leonid Kinskey) stages a publicity stunt involving actress April Tremaine (Marjorie Woodworth), railroad engineer Mike Monohan (Victor McLaglen), and a baby (Gay Ellen Dakin), which turns into a real kidnapping, leaving Tremaine caught in the middle aboard the flagship train of the Pennsylvania Railroad.

== Cast ==
- Victor McLaglen as Maurice "Mike" Monohan
- Marjorie Woodworth as April Tremaine / Mary Potter
- Dennis O'Keefe as Dr. Harvey North
- Patsy Kelly as Patsy Riley
- ZaSu Pitts as Myra Pottle
- Leonid Kinskey as Ivan Makail Ivanski
- George E. Stone as Lefty
- Gay Ellen Dakin as Baby
- Charles C. Wilson as Detective
- John Sheehan as Conductor
- Edgar Edwards as State Trooper
- Eric Alden as State Trooper
- Sam McDaniel as Train Porter
- J. Farrell McDonald as RR Line Supt. Mulcahy (uncredited)
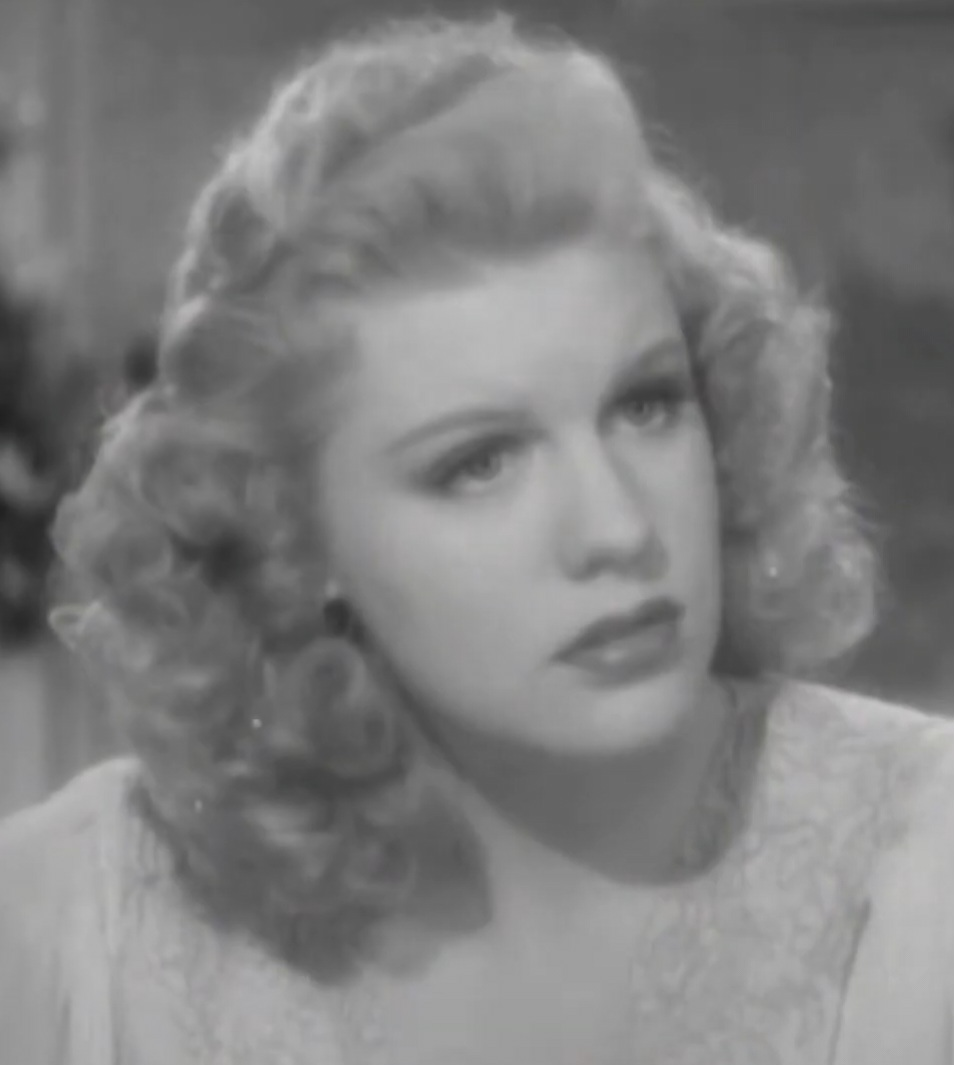
Marjorie Woodworth in Broadway Limited

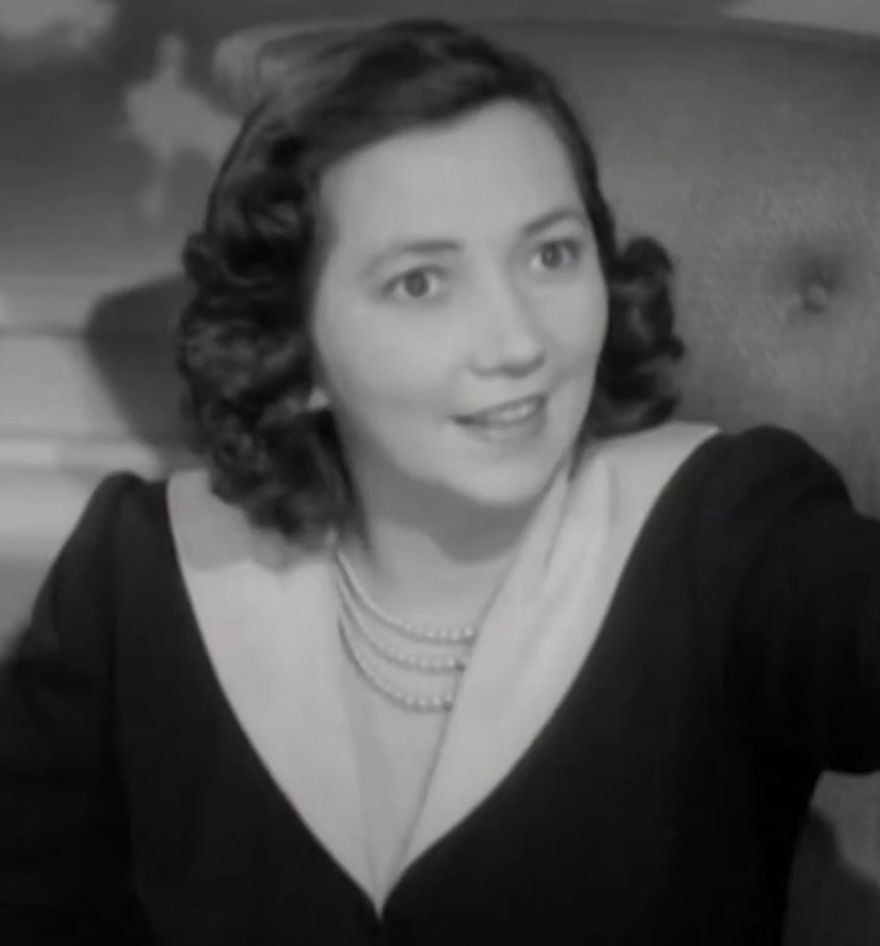
Patsy Kelly in Broadway Limited

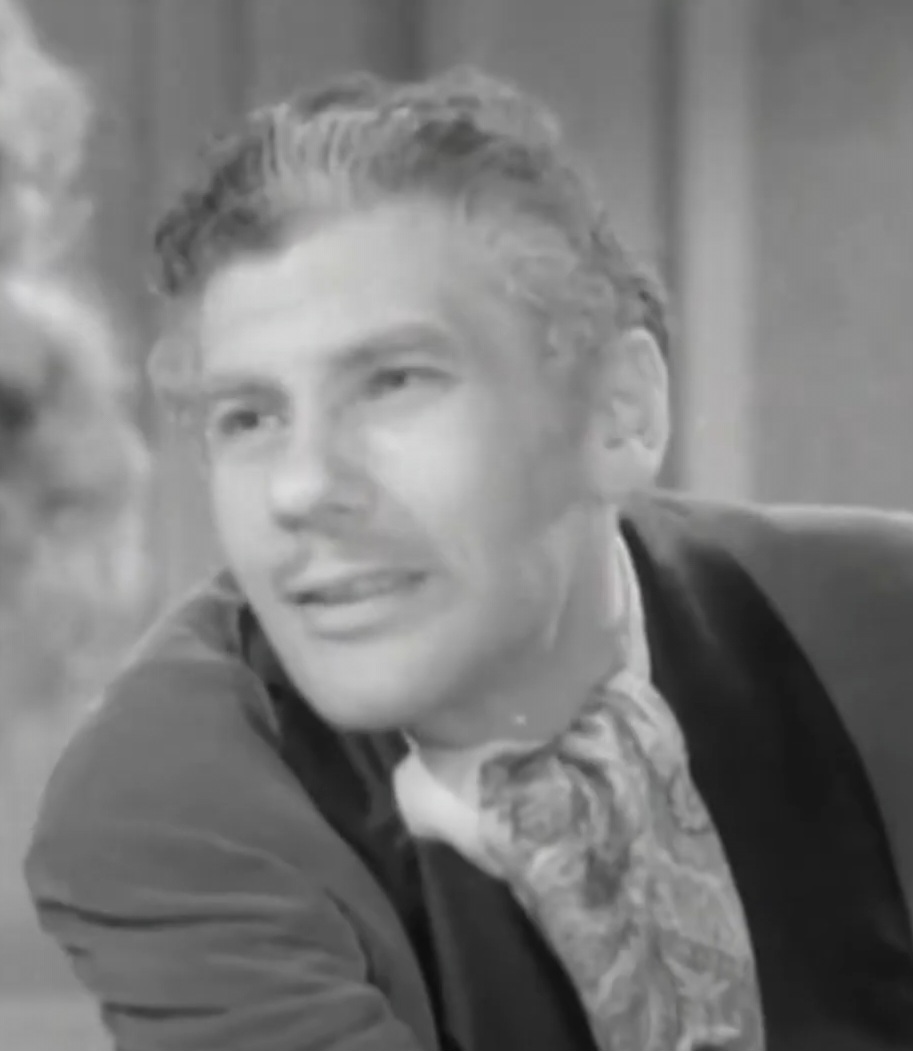
Leonid Kinskey in Broadway Limited
