= Charlie Hall (actor, born 1899) =

English actor (1899–1959)

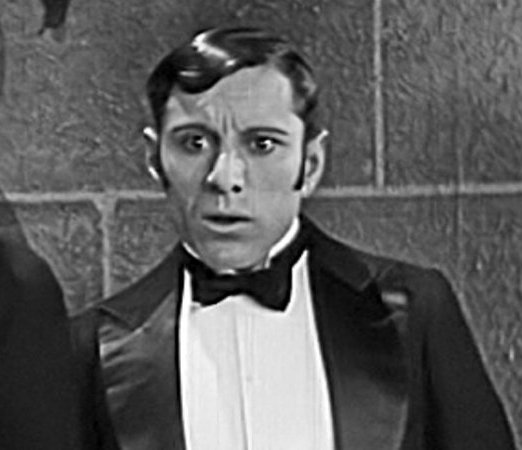
- Hall in Love 'em and Weep, 1927
- Born: 19 August 1899; Birmingham, Warwickshire, England
- Died: 7 December 1959 (aged 60); Los Angeles, California, United States
- Years active: 1921–1956
- Spouses: Wilda George; Dolly Gray (died 1937)

Charlie Hall (also credited Charley Hall; 19 August 1899 – 7 December 1959) was an English film actor. He is best known for his appearances as a nemesis of Laurel and Hardy. He performed in nearly 50 films with them, making Hall the most frequent supporting actor in the comedy duo's productions.

== Life and career ==
Hall was born in Ward End, Birmingham, Warwickshire, and learned carpentry as a trade; however, as a teenager, he became a member of the Fred Karno troupe of stage comedians. In his late teens, he visited his sister in New York City and stayed there, finding employment as a stagehand. While working behind the scenes, he met the comic actor Bobby Dunn and they became friends; Dunn convinced Hall to take a stab again at acting, which he did. By the mid-1920s, Hall was working for Hal Roach. Stan Laurel, one of Roach's comedy stars, was also a graduate of the Karno troupe.

As an actor, Hall worked with such comedians as Buster Keaton and Charley Chase, but he is best remembered as a comic foil for Laurel and Hardy. He appeared in nearly 50 of their films, sometimes in bit parts, but often as a mean landlord or opponent in many of their memorable tit-for-tat sequences. Unlike the usual villains in Laurel and Hardy films, who were big and burly, Charlie Hall (billed as "Charley" Hall in the Roach comedies) was of short stature, standing 5 ft 5 in tall. His height and slight English accent allowed him to be convincingly cast as a college student, despite being 40 years old, in Laurel and Hardy's A Chump at Oxford.

Hall almost never played starring roles; the exception was in 1941, when he was teamed with character comedian Frank Faylen by Monogram Pictures. Hall continued to play bits and supporting roles in short subjects and features through the 1940s and 1950s, occasionally on television, and appearing briefly in Charlie Chaplin's final American film, Limelight (1952).

In 1956 he played his final roles, firstly in the TV show Cheyenne, season 1, episode 11, "Quicksand", and finally in a Joe McDoakes short, So You Want to Play the Piano.

== Death and legacy ==
Hall died of colon cancer at his home in North Hollywood, California on 7 December 1959 and was buried three days later in Forest Lawn Memorial Park in nearby Glendale. On the retired actor's official death certificate—registered by the California Department of Public Health on December 10, 1959—his "Last Occupation" is cited as "Prop Maker" at "Warner Brothers Studio".

A J D Wetherspoon's public house in the Erdington suburb of Birmingham is named The Charlie Hall in tribute to him.

== Selected filmography ==
- Cruise of the Jasper B (1926) - Mover (uncredited)
- College (1927) - Coxswain (uncredited)
- Leave 'Em Laughing (1928) - Landlord (uncredited)
- Coney Island (1928) - Brawler (uncredited)
- Crooks Can't Win (1928) - 'Bull' Savage
- Lady Be Good (1928) - Backstage Actor in Blackface (uncredited)
- The Butter and Egg Man (1928) - Pickpocket (uncredited)
- Two Tars - (1928) - Shopkeeper (uncredited)
- Captain Swagger (1928) - Messenger (uncredited)
- Must We Marry? (1928)
- Double Whoopee (1929) - Cab driver (uncredited)
- Why Bring That Up? (1929) - Tough
- They Go Boom (1929) - Landlord (uncredited)
- Let's Go Native (1930) - Mover (uncredited)
- Men of the North (1930) - Townsman at Hearing (uncredited)
- Noche de duendes (1930) - Un pasajero (uncredited)
- Los calaveras (1931) - The Landlord
- Politiquerías (1931) - Elevator Operator
- Sweepstakes (1931) - Little Cook (uncredited)
- Laughing Gravy (1931) - Landlord
- Come Clean (1931) - Ice Cream vendor (uncredited)
- Pardon Us (1931) - Dental Assistant (uncredited)
- Bad Company (1931) - Ship's Steward (uncredited)
- Delicious (1931) - Policeman (uncredited)
- The Music Box (1932) - Postman (uncredited)
- Law and Order (1932) - Saloon Waiter (uncredited)
- What Price Hollywood? (1932) - Reporter (uncredited)
- Million Dollar Legs (1932) - Klopstokian Athlete (uncredited)
- Hold 'Em Jail (1932) - Referee (uncredited)
- Pack Up Your Troubles (1932) - Janitor (uncredited)
- Les carottiers (1932) - Bellboy / Landlord
- Cynara (1932) - Courtroom Spectator (uncredited)
- King Kong (1933) - Member of Ship's Crew (uncredited)
- Diplomaniacs (1933) - Shaffner the Valet (uncredited)
- Morning Glory (1933) - Actor (uncredited)
- Sons of the Desert (1933) - 2nd Waiter (uncredited)
- The Midnight Patrol (1933) - Tire Thief's Partner (uncredited)
- Busy Bodies (1933) - Shop Worker (uncredited)
- Cockeyed Cavaliers (1934) - Coach Driver (uncredited)
- Call It Luck (1934) - Detective (uncredited)
- The Gay Divorcee (1934) - Messenger at Dock (uncredited)
- Kentucky Kernels (1934) - Cigarette Stand Owner (uncredited)
- The Live Ghost (1934) - Sailor at Table
- Them Thar Hills (1934) - Mr.Hall
- Babes in Toyland (1934) - Townsman (uncredited)
- Kid Millions (1934) - Native (uncredited)
- Tit for Tat (1935) - Mr.Hall
- Top Hat (1935) - Minor Role (uncredited)
- Thicker Than Water (1935) - Bank Teller (uncredited)
- Bonnie Scotland (1935) - Native Henchman (uncredited)
- Annie Oakley (1935) - Drunk in Saloon (uncredited)
- The Bohemian Girl (1936) - Gypsy Offering Congratulations (voice, uncredited)
- Neighborhood House (1936) - Movie Usher on Stage (uncredited)
- Kelly the Second (1936) - Ring Attendant (uncredited)
- Swing Time (1936) - Taxi Driver (uncredited)
- Our Relations (1936) - Man in Pawnshop (uncredited)
- Shall We Dance (1937) - Ship's Bartender (uncredited)
- Pick a Star (1937) - Assistant Director (uncredited)
- Riding on Air (1937) - Singer / Barber (uncredited)
- Hey! Hey! USA (1938) - Leary's pal
- Captain Fury (1939) - Gossiping Citizen (uncredited)
- Five Came Back (1939) - Airport Worker (uncredited)
- Man About Town (1939) - Stage Pageboy / Bob's Assistant (uncredited)
- Bachelor Mother (1939) - Dance Hall Official (uncredited)
- The Hunchback of Notre Dame (1939) - Mercury (uncredited)
- A Chump at Oxford (1939) - Student Hector
- Mexican Spitfire (1940) - Elevator Operator (uncredited)
- Vigil in the Night (1940) - Courtroom Spectator (uncredited)
- Primrose Path (1940) - Man in Diner (uncredited)
- Curtain Call (1940) - Second Waiter (uncredited)
- Saps at Sea (1940) - Desk Clerk (uncredited)
- You Can't Fool Your Wife (1940) - Ritz Amsterdam Bellboy
- Millionaires in Prison (1940) - Cockney Convict Heckler (uncredited)
- Mexican Spitfire Out West (1940) - Elevator Boy (uncredited)
- One Night in the Tropics (1940) - Second S.S. Atlantica Steward (uncredited)
- They Met in Argentina (1941) - Sailor in Cantina Brawl (uncredited)
- San Antonio Rose (1941) - Waiter (uncredited)
- Father Steps Out (1941) - Short Hobo 'Nap', aka Napoleon
- Top Sergeant Mulligan (1941) - Budd Doolittle
- Niagara Falls (1941) - Bellhop (uncredited)
- Cadet Girl (1941) - Soldier at Camp Show (uncredited)
- The Mexican Spitfire's Baby (1941) - Nightclub Waiter (uncredited)
- Hellzapoppin' (1941) - Taxi Driver (uncredited)
- Man from Headquarters (1942) - Newspaper Photographer
- Sing Your Worries Away (1942) - Waiter (uncredited)
- Yokel Boy (1942) - Gaffer (uncredited)
- The Falcon Takes Over (1942) - Swan Club Waiter Louie (uncredited)
- The Big Street (1942) - Caviar Waiter in New York (uncredited)
- Police Bullets (1942) - Rabbit
- Criminal Investigator (1942) - Soapy Davis
- Seven Days' Leave (1942) - Waiter (uncredited)
- Forever and a Day (1943) - Minor Role (scenes deleted)
- The Ape Man (1943) - Barney the Photographer (uncredited)
- Honeymoon Lodge (1943) - Hotel Handyman (uncredited)
- Holy Matrimony (1943) - Townsman (uncredited)
- So's Your Uncle (1943) - Waiter
- His Butler's Sister (1943) - Porter (uncredited)
- Swingtime Johnny (1943) - (uncredited)
- The Lodger (1944) - Comedian (uncredited)
- Week-End Pass (1944) - Man Hit by Tomato (uncredited)
- The Canterville Ghost (1944) - Bold Sir Guy's Squire (uncredited)
- In Society (1944) - Mugg (uncredited)
- Hi, Beautiful (1944) - Milkman (uncredited)
- She Gets Her Man (1945) - Painter Gag Man (uncredited)
- Her Lucky Night (1945) - Window-Washer (uncredited)
- On Stage Everybody (1945) - Painter (uncredited)
- Radio Stars on Parade (1945) - Horse's Front End (scenes deleted)
- Mama Loves Papa (1945) - Bartender (uncredited)
- Confidential Agent (1945) - Miner (uncredited)
- The Crimson Canary (1945) - Apartment Janitor (uncredited)
- Without Reservations (1946) - Window-Washer (uncredited)
- Dressed to Kill (1946 film) - Cab Driver (uncredited)
- Sister Kenny (1946) - Airport Attendant (uncredited)
- Abie's Irish Rose (1946) - Hotel Porter
- The Milkman (1950) - Ed (uncredited)
- Limelight (1952) - Newsboy (uncredited)
- Million Dollar Mermaid (1952) - Minor Role (uncredited)
- Androcles and the Lion (1952) - Town Crier (uncredited)
- Rogue's March (1953) - Batman (uncredited)
- The Abbott and Costello Show (Television)--1953, Second Season---Roof Repairman
- Illegal (1955) - Bellhop (uncredited)
- So You Want to Play the Piano (1956) - Clyde (uncredited)
- Alfred Hitchcock Presents (1956) (Season 1 Episode 21: "Safe Conduct") as Man with Pool Cue (uncredited)
