= Leroy Shield =

American film score and radio composer (1893–1962)

Leroy Bernard Shield
- Leroy Shield as director of music for NBC

Background information
- Also known as: Roy Shield; Roy Shields; Leroy Shields
- Born: October 2, 1893; Waseca, Minnesota, U.S.
- Died: January 9, 1962 (aged 68) Vero Beach, Florida, U.S.
- Genres: Film score, show tunes
- Occupations: Songwriter; composer; conductor
- Labels: RCA Victor, National Broadcasting Company

Leroy Bernard Shield (October 2, 1893 – January 9, 1962) was an American film score and radio composer. He is best known for the themes and incidental music he wrote for the classic Hal Roach comedy short films of the 1930s, including the Our Gang and Laurel and Hardy series.

== Career ==
Shield was a native of Waseca, Minnesota. Around 1922, he became a staff musician for the Victor Talking Machine Company (which later became RCA Victor), where he composed and conducted on-air music, and provided piano accompaniment on hundreds of popular and USF (US domestic foreign language) Victor recordings. He also worked part-time for the Hal Roach film studio, composing countless background themes that became associated with such Roach comedy stars as Laurel and Hardy, Our Gang, ZaSu Pitts and Thelma Todd, and Charley Chase. "The Good Old Days", Shield's composition for the 1930 Our Gang short Teacher's Pet, became the series's theme song, "Let's Go" was the theme used for shorts by The Boy Friends, and his 1930 song "Beautiful Lady" was used as the theme song for the Pitts and Todd films.

On September 25, 1930, Shield recorded his only commercial recordings, "Sing Song Girl" (vocal by James Blackstone) and "Song Of The Big Trail" (vocal by Bud Jamison), issued as Victor 22548.

His only known screen appearance was as the bandleader in the nightclub scenes for the premiere Pitts and Todd 1931 short entitled Let's Do Things, which was directed by Roach himself.

== Later career and death ==
A series of miscommunications led to Shield's requests for scoring assignments from the Roach organization being repeatedly declined after 1936; the work went instead to Marvin Hatley. Shield continued to work for NBC in various musical capacities, including composition and conducting. He also wrote two tone poems, Gloucester and The Great Bell, and the classical Union Pacific Suite.

In 1942, he was awarded an honorary doctorate at the Chicago Musical College and was henceforth known as "Dr. Roy Shield".

In 1947 Shield replaced H. Leopold Spitalny as the personnel contractor for Arturo Toscanini's NBC Symphony Orchestra. He accompanied Toscanini and the orchestra on their 1950 coast-to-coast tour of the United States. Shield retired in 1955. He died on January 9, 1962, in Vero Beach, Florida.

== Legacy ==
In 1992, the Dutch band The Beau Hunks transcribed and recorded Shield's music from the Hal Roach comedies. The recordings drew praise from cartoonist R. Crumb, who rendered a portrait of Shield for the CD cover, and led to a renewed appreciation of the composer's work. In late 2016, producer and pianist Alessandro Simonetto published a CD, Leroy Shield: The Laurel & Hardy Piano Music (AEVEA/OnClassical AE16024) with music from the original manuscripts and publications, and some piano transcriptions of Shield's music.

== Listen to ==
- Leroy Shield: clips and concerts
