= List of black-and-white films that have been colorized =

This is a list of black and white films that were subsequently colorized.

== A ==
Title	Year produced	Year colorized	Distributor and color conversion company
Above and Beyond	1952	1992	Turner Entertainment
The Absent-Minded Professor	1961	1986	The Walt Disney Company (Color Systems Technology) (Note: Color Systems Technology, Inc. was later named CST Entertainment Imaging Inc. and CST Entertainment Inc. The company went bankrupt in 1997.)
An Ache in Every Stake	1941	2004	Columbia Pictures (West Wing Studios)
Across the Pacific	1942	1987	Turner Entertainment
Action in the North Atlantic	1943	1988	Turner Entertainment
Adam's Rib	1949	1988	Turner Entertainment
The Adventures of Huckleberry Finn	1939	1989	Turner Entertainment
Advise & Consent	1962	1988	Hal Roach Studios (Note: Hal Roach Studios produced films from 1914 until its bankruptcy in 1960. The company was reorganized in 1971. Its library was purchased by Hal Roach Studios, Inc., a Canadian company unrelated to Hal Roach. Its subsidiary, Colorization, Inc., was one of the pioneers of digital film colorization. The company and its assets changed hands in a convoluted fashion, operating as Qintex Entertainment and as part of companies including Cabin Fever Entertainment, Hallmark Entertainment and RHI Entertainment, now Sonar Entertainment.)
Africa Screams	1949	1988	Color Systems Technology
Africa Screams	1949	2005	Legend Films
Africa Squeaks	1940	1992	Warner Bros.
After the Thin Man	1936	1993	Turner Entertainment
All Fall Down	1962	1989	Turner Entertainment
Allegheny Uprising	1939	1989	Turner Entertainment
All the Young Men	1960	1992	Columbia Pictures (American Film Technologies)
Alpine Antics	1936	1995	Warner Bros.
Ambush	1950	1992	Turner Entertainment
The Americanization of Emily	1964	1990	Turner Entertainment
Anatomy of a Murder	1959	1992	Columbia Pictures (American Film Technologies)
And Then There Were None	1945	1974	20th Century Fox
And the Wife Shall Revere Her Husband	1965	2016	Spentzos Film (West Wing Studios)
Angel and the Badman	1947	1986	Hal Roach Studios (Colorization, Inc.)
Angel and the Badman	1947	1991	Republic Pictures
Angels with Dirty Faces	1938	1989	Turner Entertainment (Color Systems Technology)
The Angry Hills	1959	1992	Turner Entertainment
Annie Oakley	1935	1991	Turner Entertainment
Another Fine Mess	1930	1992	Cabin Fever Entertainment
Arbor Day	1936	1994	RHI Entertainment, Inc.
Arch of Triumph	1948	1992	Republic Pictures
Arsenic and Old Lace	1944	1988	Turner Entertainment (Color Systems Technology)
The Asphalt Jungle	1950	1988	Turner Entertainment
Autumn Leaves	1956	1991	Columbia Pictures (American Film Technologies)
The Awful Truth	1937	1991	Columbia Pictures (American Film Technologies)

== B ==
Title	Year produced	Year colorized	Distributor and color conversion company
Babes in Arms	1939	1993	Turner Entertainment
Babes in Toyland	1934	1991	American Film Technologies
Babes in Toyland	1934	2006	Legend Films (retitled March of the Wooden Soldiers)
Baby Take a Bow	1934	1995	20th Century Fox
Baby the Rain Must Fall	1965	1992	Columbia Pictures (American Film Technologies)
The Bachelor and the Bobby-Soxer	1947	1988	Turner Entertainment
Bachelor Mother	1939	1989	Turner Entertainment
Back to Bataan	1945	1989	Turner Entertainment
The Bad and the Beautiful	1952	1989	Turner Entertainment
Badman's Territory	1946	1991	Turner Entertainment
Bargain Day	1931	1994	RHI Entertainment, Inc.
The Barn Dance	1929	1991	The Walt Disney Company
Bataan	1943	1988	Turner Entertainment
Battle Circus	1953	1991	Turner Entertainment
Battleground	1949	1989	Turner Entertainment
Be Big!	1931	1992	Cabin Fever Entertainment
Bear Facts	1938	2009	Legend Films
Beau Hunks	1931	1992	Cabin Fever Entertainment
Bedtime Worries	1933	1994	RHI Entertainment, Inc.
Beer Barrel Polecats	1946	2007	Columbia Pictures (West Wing Studios)
Before I Hang	1940	1992	Columbia Pictures (CST Entertainment Imaging, Inc.)
Beginner's Luck	1935	1994	RHI Entertainment, Inc.
The Bells of St. Mary's	1945	1987	Republic Pictures
Below Zero	1930	1992	Cabin Fever Entertainment
Berth Marks	1929	1992	Cabin Fever Entertainment
Beyond Tomorrow	1940	2004	Legend Films (retitled Beyond Christmas)
The Big Sky	1952	1989	Turner Entertainment
The Big Sleep	1946	1989	Turner Entertainment
The Big Steal	1949	1991	Turner Entertainment
Birthday Blues	1932	1994	RHI Entertainment, Inc.
The Bishop's Wife	1947	1991	The Samuel Goldwyn Company (American Film Technologies)
Black Beauty	1946	1988	Color Systems Technology
Black Dragons	1942	1989	American Film Technologies, Inc.
Black Hand	1950	1992	Turner Entertainment
Black Magic	1949	1989	Color Systems Technology
The Black Room	1935	1994	Columbia Pictures (CST Entertainment Imaging)
Blackboard Jungle	1955	1990	Turner Entertainment
Block-Heads	1938	1991	RHI Entertainment, Inc.
Blood on the Moon	1948	1990	Turner Entertainment
Blood on the Sun	1945	1992	Republic Pictures
Blotto	1930	1992	Cabin Fever Entertainment
The Blow Out	1936	1995	Warner Bros.
Blue Monday	1938	1988	Turner Entertainment
Blue Steel	1934	1990	Color Systems Technology
Blue Steel	1934	1995	CST Entertainment, Inc. (retitled Bandits of the Badlands)
Blue Steel	1934	2006	Legend Films (retitled Stolen Goods)
The Boogie Man Will Get You	1942	1996	Columbia Pictures (CST Entertainment Imaging, Inc.)
The Bohemian Girl	1936	1991	Hal Roach Studios
Bombardier	1943	1992	Turner Entertainment
Boom Boom	1936	1993	Warner Bros.
Boom Town	1940	1988	Turner Entertainment
Boots Malone	1952	1996	Columbia Pictures (CST Entertainment Imaging, Inc.)
Bored of Education	1936	1994	RHI Entertainment, Inc.
Bored of Education	1936	2009	Legend Films
Born Yesterday	1950	1991	Columbia Pictures (American Film Technologies)
Boys Town	1938	1989	Turner Entertainment
Brats	1930	1992	Cabin Fever Entertainment
Brewster's Millions	1945	1989	Color Systems Technology
The Bride Came C.O.D.	1941	1991	Turner Entertainment
Bride of the Monster	1955	2008	Legend Films
Brideless Groom	1947	2007	Columbia Pictures (West Wing Studios)
Bright Eyes	1934	1986	20th Century Fox (Color Systems Technology)
Bringing Up Baby	1938	1989	Turner Entertainment
Building a Building	1933	1991	The Walt Disney Company
Buried Treasure	1938	1988	Turner Entertainment
Busy Bodies	1933	1991	Hal Roach Studios

== C ==
Title	Year produced	Year colorized	Distributor and color conversion company
Calling All Curs	1939	2006	Columbia Pictures (West Wing Studios)
Came the Brawn	1938	1994	RHI Entertainment, Inc.
Camille	1936	1990	Turner Entertainment (Color Systems Technology)
Canned Fishing	1938	1994	RHI Entertainment, Inc.
The Canterville Ghost	1944	1991	Turner Entertainment
Captain Blood	1935	1987	Turner Entertainment
Captain January	1936	1994	20th Century Fox
The Captain's Pup	1938	1988	Turner Entertainment
Captains Courageous	1937	1989	Turner Entertainment
Carbine Williams	1952	1987	Turner Entertainment
Carnival of Souls	1962	2004	Legend Films
Casablanca	1942	1988	Turner Entertainment (American Film Technologies Inc.)
The Case of the Stuttering Pig	1937	1995	Warner Bros.
The Catered Affair	1956	1988	Turner Entertainment
Chain Lightning	1950	1991	Turner Entertainment
Champion	1949	1991	Republic Pictures
The Charge of the Light Brigade	1936	1987	Turner Entertainment (Color Systems Technology)
Chickens Come Home	1931	1992	Cabin Fever Entertainment
The Chimp	1932	1992	Cabin Fever Entertainment
China Seas	1935	1990	Turner Entertainment
Choo-Choo!	1932	2007	Legend Films
A Christmas Carol	1938	1988	Turner Entertainment
A Christmas Carol	1951	1989	VCI Entertainment
Christmas in Connecticut	1945	1989	Turner Entertainment
A Chump at Oxford	1940	1990	RHI Entertainment, Inc.
The Citadel	1938	1992	Turner Entertainment
Clash by Night	1952	1992	Turner Entertainment
Cleaning House	1938	1988	Turner Entertainment
The Clock	1945	1993	Turner Entertainment
Colorado Territory	1949	1991	Turner Entertainment
Command Decision	1948	1989	Turner Entertainment
Confusions of a Nutzy Spy	1943	1992	Warner Bros.
Copacabana	1947	1992	Republic Pictures
Cornered	1945	1991	Turner Entertainment
The Corsican Brothers	1941	1988	Color Systems Technology
The Count of Monte Cristo	1934	1989	Color Systems Technology
County Hospital	1932	1992	Cabin Fever Entertainment
The Cowboy and the Lady	1938	1991	The Samuel Goldwyn Company (American Film Technologies)
A Coy Decoy	1941	1990	Warner Bros.
Creature from the Haunted Sea	1961	2008	Legend Films
Creature with the Atom Brain	1955	1996	Columbia Pictures (CST Entertainment Imaging, Inc.)
The Crimson Ghost	1946	1990	Republic Pictures
Crisis	1950	1989	Turner Entertainment
Crosby, Columbo, and Vallee	1932	1992	Turner Entertainment
Crossfire	1947	1991	Turner Entertainment
Cry of the Hunted	1953	1992	Turner Entertainment
Cry of the Werewolf	1944	1992	Columbia Pictures (CST Entertainment Imaging)
Cry Terror!	1958	1990	Turner Entertainment
Curly Top	1935	1986	20th Century Fox (American Film Technologies)
The Curse of the Cat People	1944	1990	Turner Entertainment
Cyrano de Bergerac	1950	1992	Republic Pictures

== D ==
Title	Year produced	Year colorized	Distributor and color conversion company
The Daffy Doc	1938	1995	Warner Bros.
The Daffy Duckaroo	1942	1990	Warner Bros.
Daffy's Southern Exposure	1942	1992	Warner Bros.
Dakota	1945	1992	Republic Pictures
A Damsel in Distress	1937	1993	Turner Entertainment
Dangerous Moonlight	1941	1992	Turner Entertainment
Dark Command	1940	1991	Republic Pictures
Dark Passage	1947	1990	Turner Entertainment
Dark Victory	1939	1987	Turner Entertainment
David Copperfield	1935	1988	Turner Entertainment
The Dawn Rider	1935	1995	CST Entertainment, Inc. (retitled Avenging Angel)
The Dawn Rider	1935	2007	Legend Films (retitled Cold Vengeance)
A Day at the Beach	1938	1988	Turner Entertainment
The Desert Trail	1935	1995	CST Entertainment, Inc. (retitled On the Run)
Desperate Journey	1942	1991	Turner Entertainment
Destination Tokyo	1943	1987	Turner Entertainment
Destroyer	1943	1992	Columbia Pictures (American Film Technologies)
Destry Rides Again	1939	1996	Universal Pictures
The Devil Bat	1940	2008	Legend Films
The Devil Commands	1941	1991	Columbia Pictures (American Film Technologies)
The Devil-Doll	1936	1992	Turner Entertainment
Devil's Doorway	1950	1992	Turner Entertainment
Dimples	1936	1986	20th Century Fox (Color Systems Technology)
Dinner at Eight	1933	1993	Turner Entertainment (American Film Technologies)
Dirty Work	1934	1991	Hal Roach Studios
Disorder in the Court	1936	2006	Columbia Pictures (West Wing Studios)
Divot Diggers	1936	1994	RHI Entertainment, Inc.
Divot Diggers	1936	2007	Legend Films
Dizzy Doctors	1937	2006	Columbia Pictures (West Wing Studios)
DOA	1949	1986	Hal Roach Studios
Dr. Jekyll and Mr. Hyde	1941	1988	Turner Entertainment (Color Systems Technology)
A Double Life	1947	1992	Republic Pictures
The Dognapper	1934	1991	The Walt Disney Company
Dogs is Dogs	1931	1994	RHI Entertainment, Inc.
Dogs is Dogs	1931	2009	Legend Films
The Doolins of Oklahoma	1949	1996	Columbia Pictures (CST Entertainment Imaging)
Dopey Dicks	1950	2007	Columbia Pictures (West Wing Studios)
A Dream Walking	1933	1987	Turner Entertainment
Dream Wife	1953	1989	Turner Entertainment
Dressed to Kill	1946	1989	American Film Technologies
Dressed to Kill	1946	2005	Legend Films (retitled Prelude to Murder)
Dr. Strangelove	1964	1991	Columbia Pictures (American Film Technologies)

== E ==
Title	Year produced	Year colorized	Distributor and color conversion company
Earth vs. the Flying Saucers	1956	2008	Columbia Pictures (Legend Films)
Edge of Darkness	1943	1992	Turner Entertainment
Edge of the City	1957	1989	Turner Entertainment
Edison, the Man	1940	1991	Turner Entertainment
The Enchanted Cottage	1945	1991	Turner Entertainment
Eternally Yours	1939	1989	American Film Technologies
Every Girl Should Be Married	1948	1989	Turner Entertainment
Experiment in Terror	1962	1992	Columbia Pictures (American Film Technologies)
Experiment Perilous	1944	1990	Turner Entertainment

== F ==
Title	Year produced	Year colorized	Distributor and color conversion company
The Face Behind the Mask	1941	1990	Columbia Pictures (CST Entertainment, Inc.)
Fail Safe	1964	1996	Columbia Pictures (CST Entertainment Imaging)
The Fastest Gun Alive	1956	1987	Turner Entertainment
Father of the Bride	1950	1987	Turner Entertainment
Father's Little Dividend	1951	1989	Turner Entertainment (American Film Technologies)
The Fighting 69th	1940	1987	Turner Entertainment
The Fighting Kentuckian	1949	1990	Republic Pictures
The Fighting Seabees	1944	1990	Republic Pictures
The First Round-Up	1934	1994	RHI Entertainment, Inc.
Fish Hooky	1933	1994	RHI Entertainment, Inc.
Fish Tales	1936	1992	Warner Bros.
Fishy Tales	1937	1994	RHI Entertainment, Inc.
Five	1951	1991	Columbia Pictures (American Film Technologies)
The Fixer Uppers	1935	1991	Hal Roach Studios
Flame of Barbary Coast	1945	1991	Republic Pictures
Fly My Kite	1931	1994	RHI Entertainment, Inc.
Fly My Kite	1931	2007	Legend Films
The Flying Deuces	1939	1990	RHI Entertainment, Inc.
The Flying Deuces	1939	2012	Legend Films
Flying Tigers	1942	1989	Republic Pictures
For Me and My Gal	1942	1993	Turner Entertainment
For Pete's Sake!	1934	1994	RHI Entertainment, Inc.
For Pete's Sake!	1934	2007	Legend Films
Forgotten Babies	1933	1994	RHI Entertainment, Inc.
Fort Apache	1948	1989	Turner Entertainment (Color Systems Technology)
42nd Street	1933	1986	Turner Entertainment (Color Systems Technology)
Framing Youth	1937	1994	RHI Entertainment, Inc.
Freddy the Freshman	1932	1992	Turner Entertainment
Free Eats	1932	1994	RHI Entertainment, Inc.
Free Wheeling	1932	2007	Legend Films
From Here to Eternity	1953	1991	Columbia Pictures (American Film Technologies)
The Fugitive	1947	1993	Turner Entertainment
Fury	1936	1991	Turner Entertainment

== G ==
Title	Year produced	Year colorized	Distributor and color conversion company
The Gallopin' Gaucho	1929	1991	The Walt Disney Company
The Garment Jungle	1957	1994	Columbia Pictures (CST Entertainment Imaging)
Gaslight	1944	1992	Turner Entertainment
The Gay Divorcee	1934	1993	Turner Entertainment
The Gazebo	1959	1988	Turner Entertainment
Gentleman Jim	1942	1992	Turner Entertainment
George Washington Slept Here	1942	1991	Turner Entertainment
Georgy Girl	1966	1992	Columbia Pictures (American Film Technologies)
Get Rich Quick Porky	1937	1992	Warner Bros.
The Giant Claw	1957	1991	Columbia Pictures (CST Entertainment Imaging)
The Giant Gila Monster	1959	2007	Legend Films
Giantland	1933	1991	The Walt Disney Company
Gilda	1946	1996	Columbia Pictures (CST Entertainment Imaging, Inc.)
Glen or Glenda	1953	2009	Legend Films
A Global Affair	1964	1991	Turner Entertainment
Glove Taps	1937	1994	RHI Entertainment, Inc.
God Is My Co-Pilot	1945	1992	Turner Entertainment
Godzilla, King of the Monsters!	1956	1977	Luigi Cozzi
Going Bye-Bye!	1934	1991	Hal Roach Studios
Gold Diggers of '49	1936	1995	Warner Bros.
Golden Boy	1939	1996	Columbia Pictures (CST Entertainment Imaging)
Goodbye, Mr. Chips	1939	1993	Turner Entertainment
The Good Humor Man	1950	1992	Columbia Pictures (American Film Technologies)
Goopy Geer	1932	1992	Turner Entertainment
The Gospel According to St. Matthew	1964	2007	Legend Films
The Great Rupert	1950	2003	Legend Films (retitled A Christmas Wish)
The Great Sinner	1949	1992	Turner Entertainment
The Great Spy Chase	1964	1991	Gaumont (American Film Technologies) (retitled Les Barbouzes)
The Great Ziegfeld	1936	1993	Turner Entertainment
Gunga Din	1939	1989	Turner Entertainment

== H ==
Title	Year produced	Year colorized	Distributor and color conversion company
The Harder They Fall	1956	1992	Columbia Pictures (American Film Technologies)
Hearts Are Thumps	1937	1994	RHI Entertainment, Inc.
Hell Below Zero	1954	1992	Columbia Pictures (American Film Technologies)
Hellcats of the Navy	1957	1991	Columbia Pictures (American Film Technologies)
Hell's Horizon	1955	1992	Columbia Pictures (American Film Technologies)
Helping Grandma	1931	1994	RHI Entertainment, Inc.
Helpmates	1932	1986	Hal Roach Studios
Heidi	1937	1987	20th Century Fox
The Henpecked Duck	1941	1992	Warner Bros.
Here Comes Mr. Jordan	1941	1995	Columbia Pictures (CST Entertainment Imaging Inc).
Her Husband's Affairs	1947	1992	Columbia Pictures (American Film Technologies)
Hi'-Neighbor!	1934	1994	RHI Entertainment, Inc.
Hi'-Neighbor!	1934	2007	Legend Films
Hide and Shriek	1938	1994	RHI Entertainment, Inc.
Hide and Shriek	1938	2007	Legend Films
High Noon	1952	1990	Republic Pictures
High Sierra	1941	1988	Turner Entertainment
High Wall	1947	1992	Turner Entertainment
His Girl Friday	1940	1995	Columbia Pictures (CST Entertainment Imaging, Inc.
Hog Wild	1930	1992	Cabin Fever Entertainment
Holiday	1938	1996	Columbia Pictures (CST Entertainment Imaging, Inc.)
Holiday Affair	1949	1991	Turner Entertainment
Holiday Inn	1942	2008	Universal Pictures (Legend Films)
Honduras Hurricane	1938	1988	Turner Entertainment
Honky Tonk	1941	1992	Turner Entertainment
Hook and Ladder	1932	1994	RHI Entertainment, Inc.
The Hoose-Gow	1929	1992	Cabin Fever Entertainment
House on Haunted Hill	1959	2005	Legend Films
The Houston Story	1956	1997	Columbia Pictures (CST Entertainment Imaging, Inc.)
Human Desire	1954	1992	Columbia Pictures (American Film Technologies)
Hum Dono	1961	2011	Navketan films
The Human Comedy	1943	1990	Turner Entertainment
The Hunchback of Notre Dame	1939	1988	Turner Entertainment
The Hurricane	1937	1991	The Samuel Goldwyn Company (American Film Technologies)

== I ==
Title	Year produced	Year colorized	Distributor and color conversion company
I Remember Mama	1948	1990	Turner Entertainment
I'll Cry Tomorrow	1955	1989	Turner Entertainment
I'll Never Heil Again	1941	2007	Columbia Pictures (West Wing Studios)
Imitation General	1958	1992	Turner Entertainment
The Impatient Patient	1942	1992	Warner Bros.
In Name Only	1939	1993	Turner Entertainment
In Old California	1942	1991	Republic Pictures
In Old Oklahoma	1943	1992	Republic Pictures
In This Our Life	1942	1990	Turner Entertainment
Intruder in the Dust	1949	1994	Turner Entertainment
Invasion of the Body Snatchers	1956	1988	Republic Pictures
It Came from Beneath the Sea	1955	2008	Columbia Pictures (West Wing Studios)
It Happened One Night	1934	1996	Columbia Pictures (CST Entertainment Imaging, Inc.)
It Should Happen to You	1954	1990	Columbia Pictures (American Film Technologies)
It's a Wonderful Life	1946	1986	Hal Roach Studios (Colorization, Inc.)
It's a Wonderful Life	1946	1989	Republic Pictures (American Film Technologies, Inc.)
It's a Wonderful Life	1946	2007	Paramount Home Entertainment (Legend Films)
It's a Wonderful World	1939	1992	Turner Entertainment
It's Got Me Again!	1932	1992	Turner Entertainment

== J ==
Title	Year produced	Year colorized	Distributor and color conversion company
The Jackie Robinson Story	1950	2005	Legend Films
Jailhouse Rock	1957	1989	Turner Entertainment
Jak rozpętałem drugą wojnę światową - three parts	1970	2001	Polsat / Studio Filmowe "Oko" (Dynacs Digital Studios)
Jeepers Creepers	1939	1968	Warner Bros.
Jeepers Creepers	1939	1990	Warner Bros.
Jezebel	1938	1988	Turner Entertainment (Tintoretto Inc.)
Johnny Belinda	1948	1991	Turner Entertainment
Johnny Eager	1941	1993	Turner Entertainment (American Film Technologies)
Jour de fête	1949	1964	
Jour de fête	1949	1995	
Journey into Fear	1943	1991	Turner Entertainment
Julie	1956	1990	Turner Entertainment
Julius Caesar	1953	1993	Turner Entertainment
Just Around the Corner	1938	1989	20th Century Fox (Color Systems Technology)

== K ==
Title	Year produced	Year colorized	Distributor and color conversion company
Kasturi Nivasa	1971	2014	M/s KCN Enterprises
Key Largo	1948	1988	Turner Entertainment
The Kid From Borneo	1933	2007	Legend Films
Killer McCoy	1947	1992	Turner Entertainment
The Killer Shrews	1959	2007	Legend Films
King Kong	1933	1989	Turner Entertainment (American Film Technologies)
Kings Row	1942	1989	Turner Entertainment
Kit Carson	1940	1988	Color Systems Technology
Knock on Any Door	1949	1991	Columbia Pictures (American Film Technologies)
Knute Rockne, All American	1940	1988	Turner Entertainment

== L ==
Title	Year produced	Year colorized	Distributor and color conversion company
A Lad an' a Lamp	1932	2007	Legend Films
Lady from Louisiana	1941	1993	Republic Pictures
The Lady from Shanghai	1947	1992	Columbia Pictures (American Film Technologies)
The Lady in Question	1940	1996	Columbia Pictures (CST Entertainment Imaging Inc.)
A Lady Takes a Chance	1943	1992	Republic Pictures
The Last Days of Pompeii	1935	1990	Turner Entertainment
The Last Gangster	1937	1992	Turner Entertainment
The Last Man on Earth	1964	2008	Legend Films
The Last of the Mohicans	1936	1989	Color Systems Technology
The Last Picture Show	1971	1996	Columbia Pictures (CST Entertainment Imaging, Inc.)
Laughing Gravy	1931	1991	Hal Roach Studios
The Laurel-Hardy Murder Case	1930	1991	Hal Roach Studios
The Lawless Frontier	1934	1995	CST Entertainment, Inc. (retitled Vengeance Is Mine)
The Letter	1940	1989	Turner Entertainment (Tintoretto Inc.)
Libeled Lady	1936	1994	Turner Entertainment
Little Beau Porky	1936	1992	Warner Bros.
The Little Colonel	1935	1986	Color Systems Technology
Little Miss Broadway	1938	1986	Color Systems Technology
Little Miss Marker	1934	1996	MCA/Universal Home Video (CST Entertainment Imaging, Inc.)
The Little Shop of Horrors	1960	1987	Color Systems Technology
The Little Shop of Horrors	1960	2006	Legend Films
Little Women	1933	1992	Turner Entertainment
The Littlest Rebel	1935	1986	Color Systems Technology
The Live Ghost	1934	1988	Hal Roach Studios
The Live Ghost	1934	1991	Hal Roach Studios
The Longest Day	1962	1994	20th Century Fox (CST Entertainment Imaging)
Love Business	1931	1994	RHI Entertainment, Inc.
The Lucky Corner	1936	1994	RHI Entertainment, Inc.
The Lucky Texan	1934	1990	Color Systems Technology
The Lucky Texan	1934	1995	CST Entertainment, Inc. (retitled Cowboy G-man)
The Lucky Texan	1934	2006	Legend Films (retitled Gold Strike River)
Lust for Gold	1949	1994	Columbia Pictures (CST Entertainment Imaging)
The Lusty Men	1952	1991	Turner Entertainment

== M ==
Title	Year produced	Year colorized	Distributor and color conversion company
Macao	1952	1992	Turner Entertainment
Madame Bovary	1949	1992	Turner Entertainment
The Mad Miss Manton	1938	1992	Turner Entertainment
Made for Each Other	1939	1988	Hal Roach Studios
Magic Town	1947	1990	Republic Pictures
The Magnificent Ambersons	1942	1989	Turner Entertainment
Mail and Female	1937	1994	RHI Entertainment, Inc.
Mail and Female	1937	2009	Legend Films
The Maltese Falcon	1941	1986	Turner Entertainment
Mama's Little Pirate	1934	1994	RHI Entertainment, Inc.
Mama's New Hat	1939	1988	Turner Entertainment
The Man from Utah	1934	1991	Republic Pictures
The Man from Utah	1934	1995	CST Entertainment, Inc. (retitled Rodeo Racketeers)
The Man in the Iron Mask	1939	1990	Video Treasures (Color Systems Technology)
The Man They Could Not Hang	1939	1992	Columbia Pictures (CST Entertainment Imaging, Inc.)
The Man Who Came to Dinner	1942	1988	Turner Entertainment
The Man with Nine Lives	1940	1994	Columbia Pictures (CST Entertainment Imaging, Inc.)
Manhattan Melodrama	1934	1990	Turner Entertainment
Mark of the Vampire	1935	1993	Turner Entertainment
The Mark of Zorro	1940	2005	20th Century Fox
Mary of Scotland	1936	1993	Turner Entertainment
The Mask of Dimitrios	1944	1992	Turner Entertainment
Mayabazaar	1957	2010	Goldstone Technologies
Me and My Pal	1933	1991	Hal Roach Studios
Meet John Doe	1941	1992	Krypton International Corporation
Men in Black	1934	2004	Columbia Pictures (West Wing Studios)
Men O' War	1929	1991	Hal Roach Studios
Mickey's Choo-Choo	1929	1991	The Walt Disney Company
Mickey's Gala Premier	1933	1991	The Walt Disney Company
Mighty Joe Young	1949	1989	Turner Entertainment
Mike Fright	1934	1994	RHI Entertainment, Inc.
Mildred Pierce	1945	1990	Turner Entertainment
The Miracle of the Bells	1948	1988	Republic Pictures
Miracle on 34th Street	1947	1985	20th Century Fox (Color Systems Technology)
Miracle on 34th Street	1947	1993	20th Century Fox (American Film Technologies)
Miracle on 34th Street	1947	2006	20th Century Fox (Legend Films)
Miss Annie Rooney	1942	1988	Color Systems Technology
Missile to the Moon	1958	2007	Legend Films
The Mask of Fu Manchu	1932	1992	Turner Entertainment
The Money Trap	1965	1993	Turner Entertainment
Moonlight for Two	1932	1992	Turner Entertainment
The Most Dangerous Game	1932	1991	Annahold, BV
Most Dangerous Game	1932	2008	Legend Films
The Mortal Storm	1940	1992	Turner Entertainment
The Mountain Road	1960	1992	Columbia Pictures (American Film Technologies)
Mr. Blandings Builds His Dream House	1948	1992	Turner Entertainment
Mr. Deeds Goes to Town	1936	1996	Columbia Pictures (CST Entertainment Imaging, Inc.)
Mr. Peabody and the Mermaid	1948	1989	Republic Pictures
Mr. Smith Goes to Washington	1939	1991	Columbia Pictures (American Film Technologies)
Mrs. Miniver	1942	1990	Turner Entertainment
Mrs. Parkington	1944	1993	Turner Entertainment
Mughal-e-Azam	1960	2004	Sterling Investment
Murder by Contract	1958	1994	Columbia Pictures (CST Entertainment Imaging)
Murder, My Sweet	1944	1990	Turner Entertainment
Mush and Milk	1933	1994	RHI Entertainment, Inc.
The Music Box	1932	1986	Hal Roach Studios (Colorization, Inc.)
Mutiny on the Bounty	1935	1989	Turner Entertainment (Color Systems Technology)
My Favorite Wife	1940	1989	Turner Entertainment
My Man Godfrey	1936	1993	Cerulean Fxs, Inc.
My Man Godfrey	1936	2005	Legend Films
Mystery Street	1950	1992	Turner Entertainment

== N ==
Title	Year produced	Year colorized	Distributor and color conversion company
The Narrow Margin	1952	1991	Turner Entertainment
Naughty Neighbors	1939	1992	Warner Bros.
Naya Daur	1957	2007	B. R. Films
'Neath the Arizona Skies	1934	1990	VidAmerica
A Night at the Opera	1935	1992	Turner Entertainment (Color Systems Technology)
Nightfall	1956	1992	Columbia Pictures (American Film Technologies)
Night 'n' Gales	1937	1994	RHI Entertainment, Inc.
Night 'n' Gales	1937	2007	Legend Films
Night of the Demon	1957	1996	Columbia Pictures (CST Entertainment Imaging)
The Night of the Iguana	1964	1992	Turner Entertainment
Night of the Living Dead	1968	1986	Hal Roach Studios
Night of the Living Dead	1968	1993	CST Entertainment Imaging, Inc.
Night of the Living Dead	1968	2004	Legend Films
Night Owls	1930	1992	Cabin Fever Entertainment
Ninotchka	1939	1991	Turner Entertainment
No Census, No Feeling	1940	2004	Columbia Pictures (West Wing Studios)
None but the Lonely Heart	1944	1990	Turner Entertainment
Notes to You	1941	1992	Warner Bros.
Now And Forever	1934	1996	MCA/Universal Home Video (CST Entertainment Imaging, Inc.)

== O ==
Title	Year produced	Year colorized	Distributor and color conversion company
Objective Burma	1945	1989	Turner Entertainment
Old Smokey	1938	1988	Turner Entertainment
Oliver the Eighth	1934	1991	Hal Roach Studios
On Dangerous Ground	1951	1992	Turner Entertainment
Once Upon a Honeymoon	1942	1992	Turner Entertainment
One Good Turn	1931	1992	Cabin Fever Entertainment
One Minute to Zero	1952	1991	Turner Entertainment
One More Time	1931	1973	Color Systems Inc.
One Touch of Venus	1948	1991	Republic Pictures
Only Angels Have Wings	1939	1991	Columbia Pictures (American Film Technologies)
On the Waterfront	1954	1992	Columbia Pictures (American Film Technologies)
Our Gang Follies of 1936	1935	1994	RHI Entertainment, Inc.
Our Gang Follies of 1936	1935	2007	Legend Films (retitled Little Rascals Follies)
Our Gang Follies of 1938	1937	1994	RHI Entertainment, Inc.
Our Little Girl	1935	1986	20th Century Fox (Color Systems Technology)
Our Relations	1936	1990	RHI Entertainment, Inc.
Our Wife	1931	1992	Cabin Fever Entertainment
Out of the Past	1947	1989	Turner Entertainment
The Outlaw	1943	1988	Hal Roach Studios
Outpost in Morocco	1949	1990	American Film Technologies

== P ==
Title	Year produced	Year colorized	Distributor and color conversion company
Pack Up Your Troubles	1932	1990	RHI Entertainment, Inc.
Pagan Moon	1932	1992	Turner Entertainment
Paradise Canyon	1935	2007	Legend Films (retitled Guns Along the Trail)
Pardon Us	1931	1990	RHI Entertainment, Inc.
Passage to Marseille	1944	1991	Turner Entertainment
Pat and Mike	1952	1992	Turner Entertainment
A Patch of Blue	1965	1990	Turner Entertainment
Patient Porky	1940	1992	Warner Bros.
Pay as You Exit	1936	1994	RHI Entertainment, Inc.
Penny Serenade	1941	1992	Republic Pictures
Perfect Day	1929	1991	Cabin Fever Entertainment
The Petrified Forest	1936	1991	Turner Entertainment
Phantom from Space	1953	2008	Legend Films
The Phantom Planet	1961	2008	Legend Films
Phffft	1954	1996	Columbia Pictures (CST Entertainment, Inc.)
The Philadelphia Story	1940	1988	Turner Entertainment
The Pigskin Palooka	1937	1994	RHI Entertainment, Inc.
The Pinch Singer	1936	1994	RHI Entertainment, Inc.
Plan 9 from Outer Space	1959	2005	Legend Films
Plane Dippy	1936	1992	Warner Bros.
Playing the Ponies	1937	2004	Columbia Pictures (West Wing Studios)
The Pooch	1932	1994	RHI Entertainment, Inc.
The Pooch	1932	2009	Legend Films
Poor Little Rich Girl	1936	1986	Color Systems Technology
Pop Goes the Easel	1935	2006	Columbia Pictures (West Wing Studios)
Porky and Gabby	1937	1992	Warner Bros.
Porky in Egypt	1938	1995	Warner Bros.
Porky in Wackyland	1938	1995	Warner Bros.
Porky's Five & Ten	1938	1992	Warner Bros.
Porky's Hare Hunt	1938	1992	Warner Bros.
Porky's Hired Hand	1940	1968	Warner Bros.
Porky's Party	1938	1992	Warner Bros.
Porky's Picnic	1939	1995	Warner Bros.
Porky's Preview	1941	1992	Warner Bros.
Porky's Railroad	1937	1968	Warner Bros.
Porky's Railroad	1937	1992	Warner Bros.
Possessed	1947	1991	Turner Entertainment
The Postman Always Rings Twice	1946	1988	Turner Entertainment
Poultry Pirates	1938	1988	Turner Entertainment
Pride of the Marines	1945	1991	Turner Entertainment
The Pride of the Yankees	1942	1991	The Samuel Goldwyn Company (American Film Technologies)
The Prince and the Pauper	1937	1988	Turner Entertainment
The Prisoner of Zenda	1937	1991	Turner Entertainment
The Public Enemy	1931	1989	Turner Entertainment
Punch Drunks	1934	2004	Columbia Pictures (West Wing Studios)
Pups is Pups	1930	1994	RHI Entertainment, Inc.
Pups is Pups	1930	2009	Legend Films
Pushover	1954	1995	Columbia Pictures (CST Entertainment, Inc.)
Puss n' Booty	1943	1990	Warner Bros.
The Pygmy Hunt	1938	1988	Turner Entertainment

== R ==
Title	Year produced	Year colorized	Distributor and color conversion company
Rachel and the Stranger	1948	1990	Turner Entertainment
The Racket	1951	1990	Turner Entertainment
Random Harvest	1942	1990	Turner Entertainment
Randy Rides Alone	1934	1991	United American Video
Randy Rides Alone	1934	1995	CST Entertainment, Inc. (retitled The Drifter)
The Range Feud	1931	1996	Columbia Pictures (CST Entertainment Imaging)
Readin' and Writin'	1932	1994	RHI Entertainment, Inc.
Rebecca of Sunnybrook Farm	1938	1986	20th Century Fox (Color Systems Technology)
The Red Badge of Courage	1951	1991	Turner Entertainment
Red Dust	1932	1992	Turner Entertainment
Red-Headed Baby	1931	1992	Turner Entertainment
Red River	1948	1996	MGM (Color Systems Technology)
Reefer Madness	1936	2004	Legend Films
Requiem for a Heavyweight	1962	1996	Columbia Pictures (CST Entertainment Imaging, Inc.)
Return of the Bad Men	1948	1989	Turner Entertainment
The Return of the Vampire	1943	1992	Columbia Pictures (American Film Technologies)
Reunion in Rhythm	1937	1994	RHI Entertainment, Inc.
Riders of Destiny	1933	1990	VidAmerica (Color Systems Technology))
Rio Grande	1950	1989	Republic Pictures
Roamin' Holiday	1937	1994	RHI Entertainment, Inc.
The Roaring Twenties	1939	1988	Turner Entertainment
Room Service	1938	1989	Turner Entertainment (Color Systems Technology)
Roughshod	1949	1992	Turner Entertainment
Rushin' Ballet	1937	1994	RHI Entertainment, Inc.
Rushin' Ballet	1937	2009	Legend Films

== S ==
Title	Year produced	Year colorized	Distributor and color conversion company
Safe at Home!	1962	1995	Columbia Pictures (CST Entertainment, Inc.)
Sagebrush Trail	1933	1990	VidAmerica (Color Systems Technology)
Sagebrush Trail	1933	1995	CST Entertainment, Inc. (retitled Fugitive)
Sagebrush Trail	1933	2006	Legend Films (retitled An Innocent Man)
Sahara	1943	1996	Columbia Pictures (CST Entertainment, Inc.)
Sail a Crooked Ship	1961	1991	Columbia Pictures (American Film Technologies)
Saint Joan	1957	1987	Hal Roach Studios
Sami Swoi	1967	2001	Polsat / Studio Filmowe "Oko" (Dynacs Digital Studios)
Sands of Iwo Jima	1949	1988	Republic Pictures
San Francisco	1936	1987	Turner Entertainment
Santa Fe Trail	1940	1988	Hal Roach Studios (Color Systems Technology)
Saps at Sea	1940	1990	RHI Entertainment, Inc.
Satya Harishchandra	1965	2008	Goldstone Technologies Limited
Scene of the Crime	1949	1992	Turner Entertainment
School's Out	1930	1994	RHI Entertainment, Inc.
School's Out	1930	2007	Legend Films
Scram!	1932	1991	Hal Roach Studios
Scrap Happy Daffy	1943	1995	Warner Bros.
Scrooge	1935	2007	Legend Films
The Sea Hawk	1940	1987	Turner Entertainment
The Sea Wolf	1941	1990	Turner Entertainment
Seabiscuit: The Lost Documentary	1939	2003	Legend Films
Seal Skinners	1939	1988	Turner Entertainment
Second Childhood	1936	1994	RHI Entertainment, Inc.
Second Chorus	1940	1988	Hal Roach Studios
Sergeant York	1941	1988	Turner Entertainment
The Set-Up	1949	1992	Turner Entertainment (American Film Technologies)
The Seventh Cross	1944	1990	Turner Entertainment
The Seventh Victim	1943	1992	Turner Entertainment
The Shaggy Dog	1959		The Walt Disney Company
The Shaggy Dog	1959	2006	The Walt Disney Company
The Shanty Where Santy Claus Lives	1933	1992	Turner Entertainment
She	1935	2007	Kino International (Legend Films)
Sherlock Holmes and the Secret Weapon	1942	1986	Hal Roach Studios
Sherlock Holmes and the Secret Weapon	1942	2005	Legend Films
Shiver My Timbers	1934	1994	RHI Entertainment, Inc.
The Shop Around the Corner	1940	1990	Turner Entertainment
Shrimps for a Day	1934	1994	RHI Entertainment, Inc.
Shrimps for a Day	1934	2007	Legend Films
Signpost to Murder	1965	1992	Turner Entertainment
Sirocco	1951	1991	Columbia Pictures (American Film Technologies)
The Sitter Downers	1937	2004	Columbia Pictures (West Wing Studios)
Slander	1956	1992	Turner Entertainment
Smile, Darn Ya, Smile!	1931	1992	Turner Entertainment
Somebody Up There Likes Me	1956	1988	Turner Entertainment
Something to Sing About	1937	1987	Hal Roach Studios
Son of Kong	1933	1993	Turner Entertainment
The Son of Monte Cristo	1940	1989	Color Systems Technology
Sons of the Desert	1933	1990	RHI Entertainment, Inc.
Spooky Hooky	1936	1994	RHI Entertainment, Inc.
Sprucin' Up	1935	1994	RHI Entertainment, Inc.
Sprucin' Up	1935	2009	Legend Films
Stand Up and Cheer!	1934	1986	Color Systems Technology
The Star Packer	1934	1995	CST Entertainment, Inc. (retitled The Shadow Gang)
Stars in My Crown	1950	1992	Turner Entertainment
Station West	1948	1989	Turner Entertainment
Stowaway	1936	1986	20th Century Fox (Color Systems Technology)
The Stranger	1946	1988	Hal Roach Studios
The Stratton Story	1949	1988	Turner Entertainment
Suddenly	1954	1986	Hal Roach Studios (Colorization, Inc.)
Suddenly	1954	2009	Legend Films
Suddenly Last Summer	1959	1994	Columbia Pictures (CST Entertainment Imaging, Inc.)
Surprise Package	1960	1995	Columbia Pictures (CST Entertainment, Inc.)
Susannah of the Mounties	1939	1986	20th Century Fox (Color Systems Technology)
Susannah of the Mounties	1939	2003	Legend Films
Suspicion	1941	1989	Turner Entertainment
Sweet Smell of Success	1957	1996	MGM (Color Systems Technology)
Swing Parade of 1946	1946	2007	Legend Films
Swiss Miss	1938	1990	RHI Entertainment, Inc.
Sylvia Scarlett	1935	1992	Turner Entertainment (American Film Technologies)

== T ==
Title	Year produced	Year colorized	Distributor and color conversion company
Tall in the Saddle	1944	1989	Turner Entertainment
The Tall Target	1951	1993	Turner Entertainment
Tarzan the Ape Man	1932	1990	Turner Entertainment
Teacher's Beau	1935	1994	RHI Entertainment, Inc.
Teacher's Pet	1930	1994	RHI Entertainment, Inc.
Tell It to the Judge	1949	1991	Columbia Pictures (American Film Technologies)
Ten Seconds to Hell	1959	1996	MGM
Terror by Night	1946	1987	Hal Roach Studios
Terror by Night	1946	2005	Legend Films
Test Pilot	1938	1990	Turner Entertainment
Texas	1941	1992	Columbia Pictures (American Film Technologies)
Their First Mistake	1932	1993	Cabin Fever Entertainment
Them Thar Hills	1934	1997	Cabin Fever Entertainment
They Died with Their Boots On	1941	1988	Turner Entertainment
They Live by Night	1948	1992	Turner Entertainment
They Were Expendable	1945	1988	Turner Entertainment
They Won't Believe Me	1947	1993	Turner Entertainment
Thicker than Water	1935	1991	Hal Roach Studios
The Thin Man	1934	1992	Turner Entertainment
The Thing from Another World	1951	1989	Turner Entertainment
Things to Come	1936	2006	Legend Films
13 Ghosts	1960	1992	Columbia Pictures (American Film Technologies)
The 30 Foot Bride of Candy Rock	1959	1992	Columbia Pictures (American Film Technologies)
Thirty Seconds Over Tokyo	1944	1988	Turner Entertainment
36 Hours	1965	1990	Turner Entertainment
Three Comrades	1938	1991	Turner Entertainment
Three Faces West	1940	1993	Republic Pictures
Three Men in a Tub	1938	1994	RHI Entertainment, Inc.
Three Strangers	1946	1991	Turner Entertainment
The Three Stooges Go Around the World in a Daze	1963	1994	Columbia Pictures (CST Entertainment Imaging, Inc.)
3:10 to Yuma	1957	1992	Columbia Pictures (American Film Technologies)
Tight Spot	1955	1996	Columbia Pictures (CST Entertainment Imaging)
Tip on a Dead Jockey	1957	1993	Turner Entertainment
Tit for Tat	1935	1991	Hal Roach Studios
To Have and Have Not	1944	1990	Turner Entertainment
Tom Brown's School Days	1940	1991	Gold Key Entertainment
Tom, Dick and Harry	1941	1992	Turner Entertainment
Too Hot to Handle	1938	1993	Turner Entertainment
Topper	1937	1985	Hal Roach Studios (Colorization, Inc.); First film to be digitally colorized
Topper Returns	1941	1987	Hal Roach Studios
Topper Takes a Trip	1938	1987	Hal Roach Studios
Torrid Zone	1940	1992	Turner Entertainment
Tortilla Flat	1942	1989	Turner Entertainment
Towed in a Hole	1932	1993	Cabin Fever Entertainment
The Trail Beyond	1934	1993	United American Video
The Trail Beyond	1934	1995	CST Entertainment, Inc. (retitled Klondike Gold)
Treasure Island	1934	1989	Turner Entertainment (American Film Technologies)
The Treasure of the Sierra Madre	1948	1989	Turner Entertainment
Trial	1955	1992	Turner Entertainment
20 Million Miles to Earth	1957	2007	Columbia Pictures (Legend Films)
The 27th Day	1957	1992	Columbia Pictures (CST Entertainment Imaging)
Twice Two	1932	1993	Cabin Fever Entertainment
The Two Mrs. Carrolls	1947	1989	Turner Entertainment
Two Too Young	1937	1994	RHI Entertainment, Inc.

== U ==
Title	Year produced	Year colorized	Distributor and color conversion company
Unaccustomed As We Are	1929	1991	Hal Roach Studios
Until They Sail	1957	1990	Turner Entertainment
Utopia	1954	1990	RHI Entertainment, Inc.

== V ==
Title	Year produced	Year colorized	Distributor and color conversion company
Village of the Damned	1960	1992	Turner Entertainment
Violent Is the Word for Curly	1938	2004	Columbia Pictures (West Wing Studios)

== W ==
Title	Year produced	Year colorized	Distributor and color conversion company
Wagon Master	1950	1989	Turner Entertainment
Wake of the Red Witch	1948	1989	Republic Pictures
Wake Up the Gypsy in Me	1933	1992	Turner Entertainment
Waldo's Last Stand	1940	2007	Legend Films
The Walking Hills	1949	1996	Columbia Pictures (CST Entertainment Imaging)
The War Lover	1962	2003 (Note: Not released)	Columbia Pictures (West Wing Studios)
Washee Ironee	1934	2007	Legend Films
Waterloo Bridge	1940	1990	Turner Entertainment
Way Out West	1937	1985	Hal Roach Studios (Colorization, Inc.)
We, the Animals Squeak!	1941	1992	Warner Bros.
Wee Willie Winkie	1937	1986	20th Century Fox (Color Systems Technology)
West of the Divide	1934	1989	Color Systems Technology
West of the Divide	1934	1995	CST Entertainment, Inc. (retitled Next of Kin)
The Westerner	1940	1991	The Samuel Goldwyn Company (American Film Technologies)
Westward the Women	1951	1988	Turner Entertainment
Westward Whoa	1936	1992	Warner Bros.
What a Lion!	1938	1988	Turner Entertainment
What Price Porky	1938	1995	Warner Bros.
While the City Sleeps	1956	1992	Turner Entertainment
White Heat	1949	1988	Turner Entertainment
White Zombie	1932	1991	Republic Pictures (American Film Technologies)
Who's Who in the Zoo	1942	1992	Warner Bros.
Wild Poses	1933	1994	RHI Entertainment, Inc.
Winchester '73	1950	1992	Universal Pictures; American Film Technologies
Winds of the Wasteland	1936	1990	Color Systems Technology
Winds of the Wasteland	1936	1995	CST Entertainment, Inc. (retitled The Stagecoach Race)
Winds of the Wasteland	1936	2007	Legend Films (retitled Stagecoach Run)
The Winning Ticket	1938	1988	Turner Entertainment
Wise Quacks	1938	1995	Warner Bros.
Without Reservations	1946	1991	Turner Entertainment
The Woman in Green	1945	1989	American Film Technologies
The Woman in Green	1945	2005	Legend Films
The Woman in the Window	1944	1996	MGM (Color Systems Technology)
Woman of the Year	1942	1989	Turner Entertainment
A Woman's Secret	1949	1992	Turner Entertainment
World War II: From The Frontlines	2023	2023	Netflix Series

== Y ==
Title	Year produced	Year colorized	Distributor and color conversion company
Yankee Doodle Dandy	1942	1986	Turner Entertainment (Color Systems Technology)
You Can't Take It With You	1938	1995	Columbia Pictures (CST Entertainment Imaging Inc.)
You Don't Know What You're Doin'!	1931	1992	Turner Entertainment
You Nazty Spy!	1940	2004	Columbia Pictures (West Wing Studios)
You Ought to Be in Pictures	1940	1995	Warner Bros.
The Young in Heart	1938	1989	Color Systems Technology
Young People	1940	1986	20th Century Fox (Color Systems Technology)
Young Tom Edison	1940	1991	Turner Entertainment
Your Cheatin' Heart	1964	1990	Turner Entertainment

== Z ==
Title	Year produced	Year colorized	Distributor and color conversion company
Zenobia	1939	1990	RHI Entertainment, Inc.
Zombies of the Stratosphere	1952	1990	Republic Pictures
