= Night 'n' Gales =

- Title card
- Directed by: Gordon Douglas
- Produced by: Hal Roach
- Cinematography: Art Lloyd
- Edited by: William H. Ziegler
- Music by: Leroy Shield; Marvin Hatley
- Distributed by: Metro-Goldwyn-Mayer
- Release date: July 24, 1937
- Running time: 10' 43"
- Country: United States
- Language: English

Night 'n' Gales is a 1937 Our Gang short comedy film directed by Gordon Douglas. It was the 156th Our Gang short to be released.

== Plot ==
Though he would rather spend his evening in peace and quiet, Mr. Hood (Johnny Arthur) is forced to endure the offkey harmonizing of The Four Nightengales, a junior singing aggregation composed of Spanky, Alfalfa, Buckwheat and Porky.

After interminable choruses of "Home! Sweet Home!", the four boys are finally ready to leave, but are forced to stay in the Hood home due to a sudden thunderstorm. Both Darla and her mother are delighted, but Mr. Hood is dismayed, especially when he is told that he must share his bed with the Four Nightengales. Driven crazy by the boys' unintentionally disruptive shenanigans, Mr. Hood escapes to the living room and tries to sleep on the couch, covering himself with a bear rug to keep warm. Naturally, the gang mistake him for a real bear, and comic chaos ensues.

== Notes ==
Comedian Johnny Arthur, who played Spanky McFarland's absent-minded father in Anniversary Trouble, returns as Darla's father in Night 'n' Gales. He was so popular with audiences that he played Darla's father once again in Feed 'em and Weep.

== Cast ==
=== The Gang ===
- Darla Hood as Darla
- Eugene Lee as Porky
- George McFarland as Spanky
- Carl Switzer as Alfalfa
- Billie Thomas as Buckwheat
- Gary Jasgur as Junior

=== Additional cast ===
- Johnny Arthur as Arthur Hood, Darla's father
- Elaine Shepard as Darla's mother

== See also ==
- Our Gang filmography
