= Oscar Lagerstrom =

American sound engineer (1890–1974)

- Born: Oscar Edmond Lagerstrom; November 19, 1890; Delhi, Minnesota, United States
- Died: July 30, 1974 (aged 83); Los Angeles, California, United States
- Occupation: Sound engineer
- Years active: 1929-1942

Oscar Lagerstrom (November 19, 1890 – July 30, 1974) was an American sound engineer. He was nominated for an Academy Award in the category Sound Recording for the film Raffles.

== Selected filmography ==
- Raffles (1930)
- Hallelujah, I'm a Bum (1933)

Our Gang shorts:

- Canned Fishing (1938)
- Bear Facts (1938)
- Three Men in a Tub (1938)
- Came the Brawn (1938)
