= Rex Downing =

American actor (1925–2020)

- Rex Downing, 1940s
- Born: Rex Haddon Downing; April 21, 1925
- Died: November 18, 2020 (aged 95); Paso Robles, California, U.S.
- Years active: 1935–1948; 2007

Rex Haddon Downing (April 21, 1925 – November 18, 2020) was an American actor as a child and youth.

== Early years ==
Downing attended Hollywood High School.

== Career ==
Rex Downing started his film career in several Our Gang comedies, but his roles there and in feature films were usually small. He received first attention when he played Young Heathcliff in the 1939 William Wyler film Wuthering Heights (1939), which was nominated for eight Academy Awards. In the following time Downing had a major role in the B-Movie serial Mandrake the Magician (1939; serial) and played the younger version of Tyrone Power's character in Blood and Sand (1941).

After his service in the U.S. Navy during World War II, he returned to the film business in 1946, but only got small parts. He left the film business in 1948 and later became a teacher around Los Angeles.

== Personal life ==
His younger brother Barry Downing was also a child actor.

Downing died in November 2020 at the age of 95.

== Filmography ==
Year	Title	Role	Notes
1935	Teacher's Beau	Our Gang Member	Short
1936	Branded a Coward	Young Billy Hume	
1935	Little Sinner	Our Gang member	Short
1936	Our Gang Follies of 1936	Kid Sneaking Two Other Kids In	Short
1936	The Pinch Singer	Our Gang Member	Short
1936	Little Miss Nobody	Orphan	Uncredited
1936	Two Too Young	Student	Short
1936	Pay as You Exit	Audience Member	Short
1936	General Spanky	Kid Army Member	Uncredited
1937	Glove Taps	Kid	Short
1937	Stella Dallas	Minor Role	Uncredited
1937	The Pigskin Palooka	Photographer	Short
1937	Love on Toast		Uncredited
1937	Wells Fargo	Child	Uncredited
1938	The Man on the Rock		Short, Uncredited
1938	Black Bandit	Young Don	
1939	Wuthering Heights	Heathcliff (as a child)	
1939	Mandrake the Magician	Tommy Houston	Serial
1939	Nurse Edith Cavell	Francois	
1939	The Escape	Tommy Rogers	
1940	Adventure in Diamonds	Buttons	Uncredited
1941	Men of Boys Town	Miles Fenlay	Uncredited
1941	Blood and Sand	Juan (as a child)	
1942	The Vanishing Virginian	Newsboy	Uncredited
1942	The Mayor of 44th Street	Bits McKarg	
1946	Gas House Kids	Mickey Papopalous	
1947	The Invisible Wall	Bellhop	Uncredited
1947	That Hagen Girl	Western Union Boy	Uncredited
1947	The Gangster	Boy with Note	Uncredited
1948	Call Northside 777	Copy Boy	Uncredited
1948	He Walked by Night	Young Hoodlum	Uncredited
1948	Act of Violence	Teenage Boy	Uncredited
2007	Harvest of Redemption	Mr. Cutchings	(final film role)
