= Gordon Douglas (director) =

American film director (1907–1993)

- Born: Gordon Douglas Brickner; December 15, 1907; New York City, U.S.
- Died: September 29, 1993 (aged 85); Los Angeles, California, U.S.
- Occupations: Film director; actor
- Years active: 1930–1977
- Spouse: Julia Mack
- Children: 2

Gordon Douglas Brickner (December 15, 1907 – September 29, 1993) was an American film director and actor, who directed many different genres of films over the course of a five-decade career in motion pictures.

== Early life ==
Brickner was born in New York City. He began his career as a child actor, appearing in some films directed by Maurice Costello. He also worked at MGM as a book-keeper.

== Career ==
=== Hal Roach and Our Gang ===
As a teenager, Douglas got a job at the Hal Roach Studios, working in the office and appearing in bit parts in various Hal Roach films. He made walk-on appearances in at least three Our Gang shorts: Teacher's Pet (1930), Big Ears (1931) and Birthday Blues (1932).

By 1934, Douglas was assistant to director Gus Meins and served as assistant director on Stan Laurel and Oliver Hardy's 1934 film Babes in Toyland and on the Our Gang comedies made between 1934 and mid-1936.

Beginning with Bored of Education in 1936, Our Gang moved from two-reel (20-minute) comedies to one-reel (10-minute) comedies, and Douglas became the senior director of the series. Bored of Education won the 1936 Academy Award for Live Action Short Film, and was the only Our Gang entry ever honored with the award.

Douglas remained with the Our Gang series as director for two years. His Our Gang shorts, featuring Spanky, Alfalfa, Darla, Porky, Buckwheat, Waldo, Butch and Woim, are the most familiar in the series’ 22-year canon. In addition to Bored of Education, the twenty Hal Roach Our Gang shorts Douglas directed include entries such as Pay as You Exit (1936), Rushin' Ballet (1937), Our Gang Follies of 1938 (1937), and Three Men in a Tub (1938). He also co-directed, with Fred Newmeyer, the 1936 Our Gang feature-film General Spanky.

Roach sold the Our Gang unit to Metro-Goldwyn-Mayer in May 1938. Douglas directed two MGM Our Gangs that year on loan from Roach, The Little Ranger and Aladdin's Lantern, before deciding that he could not get used to the more industrialized atmosphere at the larger studio.

Returning to his home studio, Douglas directed the feature Zenobia (1939) with Oliver Hardy teamed with Harry Langdon instead of Stan Laurel; it was a box office disappointment. Laurel and Hardy were reunited for Douglas' next film, Saps at Sea (1940), which became Laurel and Hardy's last film produced by the Hal Roach Studios. Douglas next helmed All-American Co-Ed, starring former Our Gang member Johnny Downs (and Langdon).

Douglas next helmed Niagara Falls (1941), one of Hal Roach's Streamliners, a series of short features less than 50 minutes, and he co-wrote and directed Roach’s’’ feature Broadway Limited (1941) and provided the story for Topper Returns (1941). His last effort for Roach was the featurette The Devil with Hitler (1942). He might have stayed with Roach indefinitely, but Roach turned his studio over to the U.S. Army for the production of wartime training films.

=== RKO films ===
Douglas moved over to RKO Radio Pictures. He made a series of low budget comedies including The Great Gildersleeve (1942), based on the radio show; and its sequel Gildersleeve on Broadway (1943), Gildersleeve's Bad Day (1943) and Gildersleeve's Ghost (1944). He also helmed The Falcon in Hollywood (1944), Girl Rush (1944), A Night of Adventure (1944) and First Yank into Tokyo (1945).

He made Zombies on Broadway (1945) with the comedy team of Brown and Carney, then San Quentin (1946), Dick Tracy vs. Cueball (1946) and If You Knew Susie (1948).

=== Columbia films ===
In 1948, Douglas migrated from RKO to producer Edward Small who had a releasing deal with Columbia Pictures. For Small, he made Walk a Crooked Mile (1948) and The Black Arrow (1948).

Columbia used Douglas on Mr. Soft Touch (1949), Between Midnight and Dawn (1950), Rogues of Sherwood Forest (1950), Fortunes of Captain Blood (1950) and The Nevadan (1950). They loaned him to British Lion to make State Secret (1950) in England.

=== Cagney Productions and Warner Bros. ===
James Cagney was making a film for Warner Bros., Kiss Tomorrow Goodbye (1950) with his brother William, and they hired Douglas to direct. Douglas signed long-term deals with Cagney Productions and Warners.

In May 1950, Douglas signed a non exclusive two-picture deal with Paramount. The first of these was The Great Missouri Raid (1951). He was meant to make a second film for Paramount but they released him so Cagney could use him again on Only the Valiant (1951) a Western with Gregory Peck.

Douglas went on to establish himself as one of Warners' leading directors of the 1950s, working in all genres: I Was a Communist for the FBI (1951); Come Fill the Cup (1951), produced by Cagney starring James Cagney; The Iron Mistress (1952) a biopic of Jim Bowie starring Alan Ladd; Mara Maru (1952), an adventure story with Errol Flynn; So This Is Love (1953), a musical biopic of Grace Moore; The Charge at Feather River (1954), a 3D Western; She's Back on Broadway (1953), a musical; Them! (1954), a science fiction film about giant ants; Young at Heart (1955), with Doris Day and Frank Sinatra; Sincerely Yours (1955) with Liberace; The McConnell Story (1955), a biopic of Joseph C. McConnell with Alan Ladd; Santiago (1956) with Ladd; Bombers B-52 (1957) and The Big Land (1957), a Western with Ladd.

His three low-budget westerns starring Clint Walker – Fort Dobbs (1958), Yellowstone Kelly (1959) and Gold of the Seven Saints (1961, from a screenplay by Leigh Brackett originally commissioned by Howard Hawks) – have been compared to Budd Boetticher's contemporary minimalist westerns with Randolph Scott.

Douglas directed The Fiend Who Walked the West (1958) at 20th Century Fox and Up Periscope (1959) for Warners, and had hits with Claudelle Inglish (1961) and The Sins of Rachel Cade (1961).

=== Freelance director ===
Douglas directed Elvis Presley in the comedy Follow That Dream (1962) made for Mirisch Productions and did Bob Hope's Call Me Bwana (1963) for Eon Productions.

He did a Western at Fox Rio Conchos (1964) then made the heist comedy Robin and the 7 Hoods (1964) for Frank Sinatra's company, starring Sinatra.

Douglas made two films starring Carroll Baker, Harlow (1965) and Sylvia (1965).

=== 20th Century Fox ===
For 20th Century Fox Douglas directed Jerry Lewis in the science fiction spoof Way...Way Out (1966), did the remake of Stagecoach (1966) and made In Like Flint (1967) with James Coburn.

Douglas made Tony Rome (1967) with Sinatra at Fox, and the Western Chuka (1967) for star-producer Rod Taylor at Paramount. There were two more with Sinatra at Fox, The Detective (1968) and a sequel to Tony Rome, Lady in Cement (1968).

=== Later career ===
After the Western Barquero (1970), Douglas did Skullduggery (1970) and directed Sidney Poitier's They Call Me Mister Tibbs! (1970) for the Mirisches. He did some uncredited directing on Skin Game (1971).

Slaughter's Big Rip-Off (1973) was a blaxploitation film and Nevada Smith (1975).

Douglas returned to Warner Bros. for his final film, 1977's Viva Knievel!, in which the stuntman Evel Knievel played himself in a fanciful biography.

Reportedly, Douglas was the only person to ever direct both Elvis and Sinatra on film.

Attempting to explain his prodigious directorial output, Douglas told Bertrand Tavernier, "I have a large family to feed, and it's only occasionally that I find a story that interests me".

=== Death ===
Douglas died of cancer at the age of 85 on September 29, 1993, in Los Angeles. He was survived by his wife, Julia Mack, and two children.

== Filmography ==
=== Director ===
- The Infernal Triangle (1935)
- Lucky Beginners (1935, short)
- Bored of Education (1936, short)
- Two Too Young (1936, short)
- Pay As You Exit (1936, short)
- Spooky Hooky (1936, short)
- General Spanky (1936) (co-director with Fred Newmeyer)
- Reunion in Rhythm (1937, short)
- Glove Taps (1937, short)
- Hearts Are Thumps (1937, short)
- Three Smart Boys (1937, short)
- Rushin' Ballet (1937, short)
- Roamin' Holiday (1937, short)
- Night 'n' Gales (1937, short)
- Fishy Tales (1937, short)
- Framing Youth (1937, short)
- The Pigskin Palooka (1937, short)
- Our Gang Follies of 1938 (1937, short)
- Canned Fishing (1938, short)
- Bear Facts (1938, short)
- Came the Brawn (1938, short)
- Feed 'em and Weep (1938, short)
- Hide and Shriek (1938, short)
- The Little Ranger (1938, short)
- Aladdin's Lantern (1938, short)
- Zenobia (1939) (also titled Elephants Never Forget)
- Saps at Sea (1940)
- Niagara Falls (1941)
- Broadway Limited (1941)
- The Great Gildersleeve (1942)
- The Devil with Hitler (1942)
- Gildersleeve on Broadway (1943)
- Gildersleeve's Bad Day (1943)
- The Falcon in Hollywood (1944)
- Girl Rush (1944)
- Gildersleeve's Ghost (1944)
- A Night of Adventure (1944)
- First Yank into Tokyo (1945) (also titled Mask of Fury)
- Zombies on Broadway (1945)
- San Quentin (1946)
- Dick Tracy vs. Cueball (1946)
- Walk a Crooked Mile (1948)
- The Black Arrow (1948)
- If You Knew Susie (1948)
- Mr. Soft Touch (1949)
- The Great Manhunt (1949)
- The Doolins of Oklahoma (1949)
- Between Midnight and Dawn (1950)
- Kiss Tomorrow Goodbye (1950)
- Rogues of Sherwood Forest (1950)
- Fortunes of Captain Blood (1950)
- The Nevadan (1950)
- The Great Missouri Raid (1951)
- Come Fill the Cup (1951)
- I Was a Communist for the FBI (1951)
- Only the Valiant (1951)
- The Iron Mistress (1952)
- Mara Maru (1952)
- So This Is Love (1953) (also titled The Grace Moore Story)
- The Charge at Feather River (1953)
- She's Back on Broadway (1953)
- Young at Heart (1954)
- Them! (1954)
- Sincerely Yours (1955)
- The McConnell Story (1955)
- Santiago (1956)
- Bombers B-52 (1957)
- Stampeded (1957)
- No Sleep Til Dawn (1957)
- The Big Land (1957)
- The Fiend Who Walked the West (1958)
- Fort Dobbs (1958)
- Yellowstone Kelly (1959)
- Up Periscope (1959)
- The Miracle (1959) (battle scenes)
- Claudelle Inglish (1961) (also titled Young and Eager)
- Gold of the Seven Saints (1961)
- The Sins of Rachel Cade (1961)
- Follow that Dream (1962)
- Call Me Bwana (1963)
- Rio Conchos (1964)
- Robin and the 7 Hoods (1964)
- Sylvia (1965)
- Harlow (Paramount version starring Carroll Baker, 1965)
- Way...Way Out (1966)
- Stagecoach (1966)
- Tony Rome (1967)
- Chuka (1967)
- In Like Flint (1967)
- The Detective (1968)
- Lady in Cement (1968)
- Barquero (1970)
- They Call Me Mister Tibbs! (1970)
- Skullduggery (1970)
- Skin Game (1971) (uncredited)
- Slaughter's Big Rip-Off (1973)
- Nevada Smith (1975)
- Viva Knievel! (1977)

=== Actor (selected) ===
- Pardon Us (1931) – Typist (uncredited)
- One Good Turn (1931) - Community Player (uncredited)
- The Mystery of Edwin Drood (1935) – Coroner (uncredited)
