= Bear Facts =

Bear Facts can refer to:

- Bear Facts (film), a 1938 Our Gang short
- The Bear Facts, an episode of Garfield and Friends
