= Glove Taps =

- Directed by: Gordon Douglas
- Produced by: Hal Roach
- Cinematography: Art Lloyd
- Edited by: William H. Ziegler
- Music by: Marvin Hatley
- Distributed by: Metro-Goldwyn-Mayer
- Release date: February 20, 1937
- Running time: 10:28
- Country: United States
- Language: English

Glove Taps is a 1937 Our Gang short comedy film directed by Gordon Douglas. It was the 151st Our Gang short to be released.

== Plot ==
Butch explains that he clobbers every kid in school to prove that he is in charge. By a fluke, weak-kneed Alfalfa is chosen to face Butch in the barnyard boxing ring—and he has only one day to train for the big bout.

Spanky volunteers to be Alfalfa's trainer, which consists mostly of Alfalfa pulling him around in a little red wagon.

Porky and Buckwheat have had "this will not end well" expressions on their faces the whole time. They take matters into their own hands once the bout starts; knocking Butch out from behind a curtain and allowing Alfalfa to take the credit.

== Notes ==
- After appearing as a peripheral player in several earlier Our Gang shorts, Tommy Bond made a spectacular return to the series in Glove Taps. Here and in all future appearances, Bond is cast as neighborhood bully Butch, the bane of the existence of Spanky McFarland, Carl "Alfalfa" Switzer and the rest of the Gang.
- Another Our Ganger debuts as Glove Taps Marks the first appearance of Darwood Kaye.
- The background music in this one-reel comedy came from Marvin Hatley's Oscar-nominated score for the Laurel and Hardy feature Way Out West.

== Cast ==
=== The Gang ===
- Eugene Lee as Porky
- George McFarland as Spanky
- Carl Switzer as Alfalfa
- Billie Thomas as Buckwheat

=== Additional cast ===
- Tommy Bond as Butch
- Sidney Kibrick as Woim
- Darla Hood as Darla
- Darwood Kaye as Waldo

=== Extra kids ===
Hugh Chapman, John Collum, Rex Downing, Larry Harris, Joe Levine, Jackie Lindquist, Donald Proffitt, Hugh Sheridan, Harold Switzer, Jerry Tucker, Bobs Watson, Robert Winkler

== See also ==
- Our Gang filmography
