= Jerry Tucker (actor) =

American child actor (1925–2016)

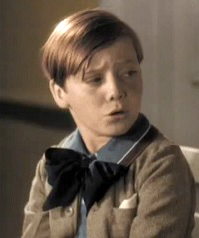
- Tucker in Captain January (1936)
- Born: Jerome Harold Schatz; November 1, 1925; Chicago, Illinois, U.S.
- Died: November 23, 2016 (aged 91); Stony Brook, New York, U.S.
- Occupation: Actor
- Years active: 1931–1992
- Spouse: Myra K. Heino (1944–2012; her death)

Jerry Tucker (born Jerome Harold Schatz; November 1, 1925 – November 23, 2016) was an American child actor, most notable for having played the "rich kid" in the Our Gang short subjects series semi-regularly from 1931 to 1938.

== Life and career ==
Tucker was born Jerome Harold Schatz in Chicago, Illinois, the son of Ruth (Keno) and Leonard Schatz. His German Jewish surname was changed to "Tucker" for his acting career. Tucker first appeared in the 1931 Our Gang short Shiver My Timbers. He appeared in seventeen Our Gang comedies through 1938's Three Men in a Tub.

In addition to his Our Gang appearances, Tucker appeared in the Marie Dressler film Prosperity, again as a spoiled rich kid. He also appeared as one of Mother Peep's children in the Laurel & Hardy feature film Babes in Toyland (1934). He also appeared with Shirley Temple in Captain January in 1936, playing the "know-it-all" boy who forgets his answers on the test. On radio, Tucker played "the juvenile lead" on Jones and I, which was broadcast on CBS in the early 1940s and Roy Barry on the soap opera Hilltop House.

Tucker went on to serve in the United States Navy during World War II and the Korean War. He served aboard the USS Sigsbee. During World War II, he sustained an injury that caused him to limp, when his ship was hit by a Japanese kamikaze. Afterwards he married Myra K. Heino and had a successful career as an electrical engineer with RCA before retiring. His wife died in August 2012.

Tucker died on November 23, 2016, of natural causes at Long Island State Veterans Home in Stony Brook, New York. He was 91.

== Filmography ==
Year	Title	Role	Notes
1931	Sidewalks of New York	Little Boy Sitting on Curb	Film debut, Uncredited
1931	Shiver My Timbers	Jerry	Short
1932	The Miracle Man	Boy	Uncredited
1932	Blonde Venus	Otto	Uncredited
1932	The Phantom President	Boy	Uncredited
1932	Prosperity	Boy	
1932	If I Had a Million	Crying Boy With Balloon	Uncredited
1932	No Man of Her Own	Little Boy in the Library	Uncredited
1933	Torch Singer	Mickey	Uncredited
1933	Bedtime Worries	Jerry	Short
1933	Wild Poses	Jerry	Short
1934	You Can't Buy Everything	Jerry – Young Clinic Patient	Uncredited
1934	Hi'-Neighbor!	Jerry – Rich Kid	Short
1934	Washee Ironee	Jerry	Short
1934	Mama's Little Pirate	Jerry	Short
1934	Babes in Toyland	Schoolboy	Uncredited
1934	Shrimps for a Day	Jerry	Short
1935	Anniversary Trouble	Jerry	Short
1935	Beginner's Luck	Jerry	Short
1935	Teacher's Beau	Jerry	Short
1935	Sprucin' Up	Jerry	Short
1935	Little Sinner	Jerry	Short
1935	Annie Oakley	Boy at Shooting Gallery	Uncredited
1935	Ah, Wilderness!	Boy with Fireworks	Uncredited
1935	Our Gang Follies of 1936	Jerry, Audience Member	Short
1936	The Pinch Singer	Jerry	Short
1936	Anything Goes	Junior	
1936	Silly Billies	Boy At Camp	Uncredited
1936	Captain January	Cyril Morgan	
1936	San Francisco	Choirboy	Uncredited
1936	Sing, Baby, Sing	Wilson's 'Son'	Uncredited
1936	Two Too Young	Student	Short
1936	General Spanky	Kid Army Member	Uncredited
1937	Glove Taps	Kid	Short
1937	Love Is on the Air	Youngster Rooting for Tiger	Uncredited
1937	Tovarich	Urchin Stealing Groceries	Uncredited
1937	Wells Fargo	Boy	Uncredited
1938	Three Men in a Tub	Spectator	Short
1938	The Devil's Party	Child	Uncredited
1938	Dick Tracy Returns	Junior	Serial
1939	The Man Who Dared	Boy Playing Football	Uncredited
1941	Always Tomorrow: The Portrait of an American Business	Young Coke Drinker	Final film, Uncredited

=== Radio ===
Year	Title	Role	Notes
1939–1940	Hilltop House	Roy Barry	
1940–1941	King Arthur, Jr.		
1941–1942	Jones and I		
1942	The Andersons		
