= Clown Princes =

- Directed by: George Sidney
- Written by: Hal Law; Robert A. McGowan
- Produced by: Jack Chertok
- Starring: Carl Switzer; George McFarland; Eugene Lee; Darla Hood; Shirley Coates; Billie Thomas; Leonard Landy; Clarence Wilson
- Cinematography: Jackson Rose
- Edited by: Roy Brickner
- Music by: David Snell
- Distributed by: MGM
- Release date: April 15, 1939
- Running time: 10:29
- Country: United States
- Language: English
- Budget: $21,243

Clown Princes is a 1939 Our Gang short comedy film directed by George Sidney. Produced and released by Metro-Goldwyn-Mayer, it was the 178th Our Gang short to be released.

== Plot ==
When the gang goes to Porky's house, they learn that his family is in danger of eviction unless they pay their landlord the balance remaining on their rent. The gang decides to raise the money by setting up a circus in Porky's barn, with Spanky as the ringleader. A sideshow outside introduces the kid circus' young patrons to Oogie-Boogie, the Wildman from Borneo (Buckwheat), Mademoiselle Darla, the Greatest Rattlesnake Charmer in the World, and the World's Shortest and Tallest Men (Slapsie in a beard and Sniffles on stilts). Also included in the sideshow are the Head Without a Body (Porky), and The Famous Sime and Neez Twins - two boys with their clothes stitched together, revealed as such when Violet the Goat eats the grass skirt covering the stitching.

Inside the main show, the gang's circus show includes a clown act, Spanky and Leonard as "a couple of swell acrobats", and lady lion-tamer Darla. When Darla's "lions" break away and everyone scrambles to catch them, Spanky runs into the landlord, to whom he pays the rest of Porky's rent.

The circus show's marquee attraction is "Daredevil Alfalfa" singing "The Daring Young Man on the Flying Trapeze", with Alfalfa's trapeze being held aloft by a pulley system attached to a horse. When a bee turns up and spooks the horse, Alfalfa finds himself pulled and jerked through the air before finally crashing through the ceiling of the barn.

== Cast ==
=== The Gang ===
- Darla Hood as Darla
- Eugene Gordon Lee as Porky
- George McFarland as Spanky
- Carl Switzer as Alfalfa
- Billie Thomas as Buckwheat
- Shirley Coates as Muggsy
- Gary Jasgar as Slapsie
- Leonard Landy as Leonard

=== Additional cast ===
- Joe Geil as World's Tallest Man / Audience member
- Clarence Wilson as The landlord

=== Orchestra and audience extras ===
Jimmy Brown, Hugh Chapman, Freddie Chapman, James Gubitosi, Larry Harris, Payne Johnson, Joe Levine, Gerald Mackey, Gloria Mackey, Harold Switzer,

== See also ==
- Our Gang filmography
