= Wally Albright =

American actor (1925–1999)

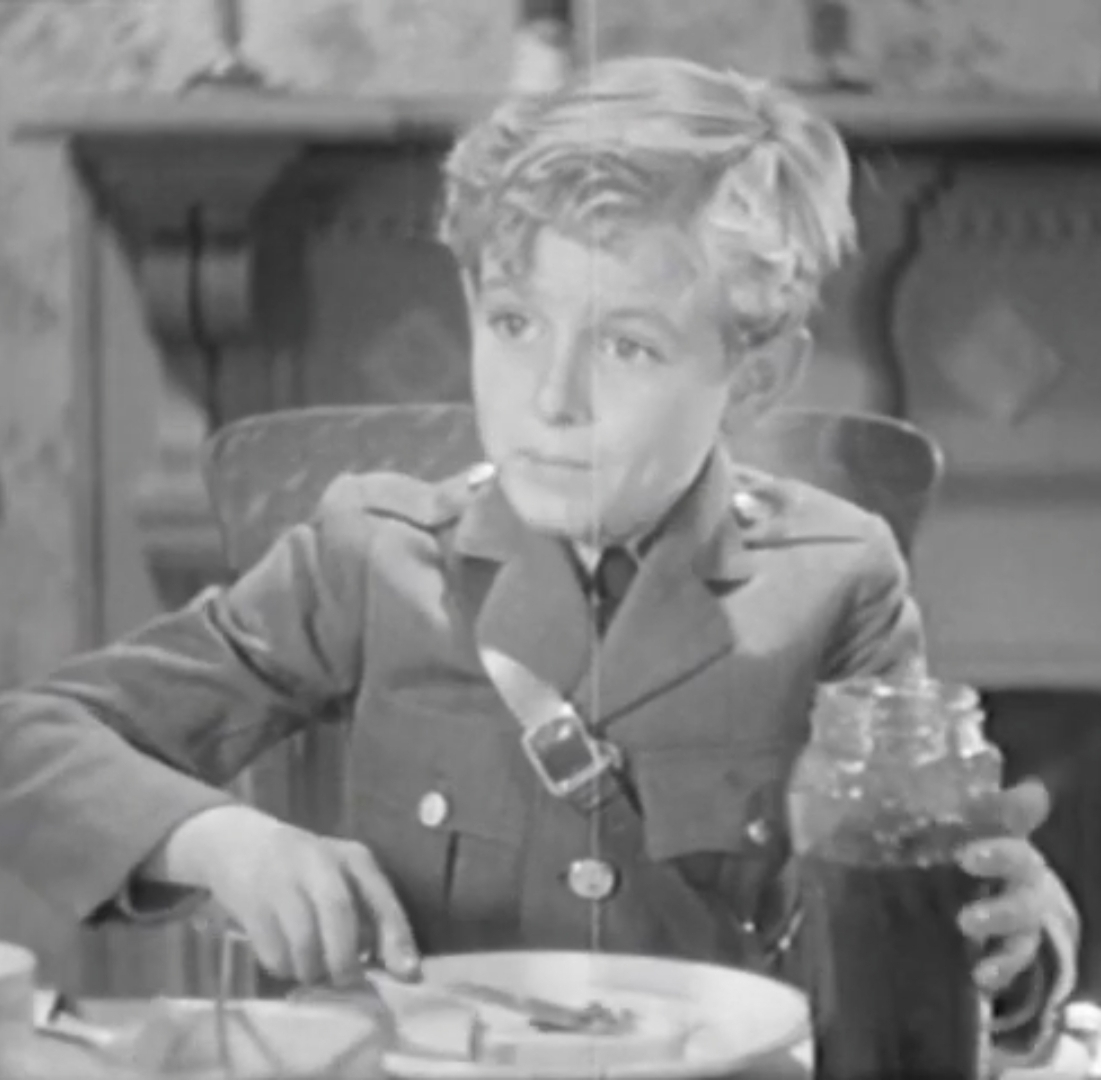
- Albright in What Price Vengeance (1937)
- Born: Walton Algernon Albright Jr. September 3, 1925; Burbank, California, U.S.
- Died: August 7, 1999 (aged 73); Sacramento, California, U.S.
- Resting place: Forest Lawn Memorial Park, Glendale, California
- Occupation: Child actor
- Years active: 1929–1954

Wally Albright (born Walton Algernon Albright Jr.; September 3, 1925 – August 7, 1999) was an American actor, water sportsman, and businessman. As a child actor, he was best known for his role in the Our Gang film series.

== Career ==
Albright was the son of Wally and Lois Albright. He was seen in a film with Gloria Swanson in 1928. He appeared in a number of films during his career, and is notable for having appeared in six Our Gang short subjects throughout the early 1930s. Though his tenure with the gang was brief, his role was usually that of the gang leader alongside Matthew "Stymie" Beard.

Albright played so many roles as a baby that he was quite well-known by the time he was three. He appeared in the small parts of various films made by Hal Roach Studios. At the end of 1933, when Gus Meins took over directing, Our Gang needed a few new characters. Several older Our Gangers left the series in the summer of 1933, including Dorothy DeBorba and Bobby "Wheezer" Hutchins.

Albright debuted in 1934 in the Our Gang short Hi Neighbor. He ended up becoming one of the most prominent members of the gang. To the dismay of Hal Roach and director Gus Meins, Albright voluntarily left the gang and returned to a normal childhood life. However, he did play a small role in The Grapes of Wrath, appearing as an older child in a migrant camp. In the movie, Albright’s character lies to Ma Joad about having good food when eating fried dough like every other migrant at the camp.

== Later years ==
In adult life, Albright became a champion water sportsman and eventually operated a successful trucking firm, shipping produce. He died in Sacramento, California, on August 7, 1999. He is buried in the Garden of Ascension at Forest Lawn, Glendale, California.

== Filmography ==
- The Case of Lena Smith (1929) as Franz (age 3) (film debut)
- Scandal (1929) as Bit Role (uncredited)
- Thunder (1929) as Davey
- Wonder of Women (1929) as Wulle-Wulle
- The Single Standard (1929) – Arden's Son (uncredited)
- The Trespasser (1929) as Jack Merrick
- Song o' My Heart (1930) as Boy (uncredited)
- The Prodigal (1931) as Peter
- East Lynne (1931) as William as a Boy
- Salvation Nell (1931) as Jimmy
- Sob Sister (1931) as Billy Stotesley (uncredited)
- Law of the Sea (1931) as Cole Andrews-as a child
- The Silver Lining (1932) as Bobby O'Brien
- Choo-Choo! (1932, Short) as Wally, an orphan
- Rebecca of Sunnybrook Farm (1932) as Billy Randall (uncredited)
- Thirteen Women (1932) as Bobby Stanhope
- The Conquerors (1932) as Roger Standish – One of the Twins
- End of the Trail (1932) as Jimmy 'Sonny' Travers
- Grand Slam (1933) as Boy Bridge Player (uncredited)
- Zoo in Budapest (1933) as Paul Vandor
- The Wrecker (1933) as Young Boy
- Ann Vickers (1933) as Mischa Feldermans (uncredited)
- Smoky (1933) as Clint's Son (uncredited)
- Mr. Skitch (1933) – Little Ira Skitch (uncredited)
- As the Earth Turns (1934) as John
- Hi'-Neighbor! (1934, Short) as Wally
- Ever Since Eve (1934) as Child (uncredited)
- For Pete's Sake! (1934, Short) as Wally
- The First Round-Up (1934, Short) as Wally
- Honky Donkey (1934, Short) as Wallace
- The Count of Monte Cristo (1934) as Albert, Age 8 (uncredited)
- You Belong to Me (1934) as Second Schoolboy (uncredited)
- Washee Ironee (1934, Short) as Waldo
- Kid Millions (1934) as Little Boy in Ice Cream Number (uncredited)
- Black Fury (1935) as Willie Novak (uncredited)
- The Affair of Susan (1935) as Boy on Stoop (uncredited)
- O'Shaughnessy's Boy (1935) as Child (uncredited)
- Waterfront Lady (1935) as Mickey O'Flaherty
- Little Miss Nobody (1936) as Orphan (uncredited)
- The Crime of Dr. Forbes (1936) as Crippled Boy (uncredited)
- Who's Lonely Now (1935, Short) as Johnson's Son (uncredited)
- Star for a Night (1936) as Hans (uncredited)
- The Cowboy Star (1936) as Jimmy Baker
- Maid of Salem (1937) as Jasper (uncredited)
- Old Louisiana (1937) as Davey
- The Woman I Love (1937) as Georges
- Captains Courageous (1937) as Boy (uncredited)
- What Price Vengeance? (1937) as Sandy MacNair
- Super-Sleuth (1937) as Teenage Fan (uncredited)
- It Happened in Hollywood (1937) as Boy (uncredited)
- Roll Along, Cowboy (1937) as Danny Blake
- Sons of the Legion (1938) as Harold
- King of the Sierras (1938) as Sonny Blake
- Boy Trouble (1939) as Boy (uncredited)
- Mexicali Rose (1939) as Tommy Romero
- The Grapes of Wrath (1940) as Boy Who Bragged of Eating Chicken (uncredited)
- Johnny Apollo (1940) as Office Boy
- Public Enemies (1941) as Tommy
- A Yank at Eton (1942) as Boy in Locker Room (uncredited)
- Junior Army (1942) as Student (uncredited)
- Laura (1944) as Newsboy (uncredited)
- The Enchanted Cottage (1945) as Soldier at Dance (uncredited)
- The Wild One (1953) as Cyclist (uncredited)
- Gypsy Colt (1954) as Don (uncredited)
- White Christmas (1954) as Andy (uncredited)
- Two on the Aisle (1956) as Director (uncredited)
- Everything's Coming Up Roses (1964) as Chadwick (uncredited)
- Da Do Ron Ron (1979) as Announcer (uncredited) (final film role)

== Bibliography ==
- Holmstrom, John. The Moving Picture Boy: An International Encyclopaedia from 1895 to 1995, Norwich, Michael Russell, 1996, p. 138-139.
- Dye, David. Child and Youth Actors: Filmography of Their Entire Careers, 1914-1985. Jefferson, NC: McFarland & Co., 1988, p. 4.
