= Mandrake the Magician (serial) =

1939 film

- Directed by: Norman Deming; Sam Nelson
- Written by: Joseph F. Poland; Basil Dickey; Ned Dandy; Screenplay, based on the comic strip by Phil Davis and Lee Falk
- Produced by: Jack Fier
- Starring: Warren Hull; Doris Weston; Al Kikume; Rex Downing
- Cinematography: Benjamin H. Kline
- Edited by: Richard Fantl; Jerry Thoms
- Music by: Morris Stoloff musical director Sidney Cutner and Floyd Morgan additional music
- Distributed by: Columbia Pictures
- Release date: May 6, 1939
- Running time: 12 chapters (215 minutes)
- Country: United States
- Language: English

Mandrake the Magician (1939) is the seventh serial released by Columbia Pictures. It was based upon the King Features comic strip of the same name.

== Plot ==
Mandrake and his assistant Lothar are working the cruise lines and make the acquaintance of Professor Houston who has developed a radium energy machine, which is much coveted by a masked crime lord known as "The Wasp". The Wasp unleashes his army of accomplices in waves to steal the invention by any means necessary. Mandrake and his allies finally catch up to "The Wasp" and discover the crime lord is actually scientist Dr. Andre Bennett, posing as a close friend of Houston.

== Cast ==
- Warren Hull as Mandrake the Magician
- Doris Weston as Betty Houston
- Al Kikume as Lothar, Mandrake's Assistant
- Rex Downing as Tommy Houston
- Edward Earle as Dr. Andre Bennett/The Wasp
- Forbes Murray as Professor Houston
- Kenneth MacDonald as James Webster
- Don Beddoe as Frank Raymond
- Dick Curtis as Dorgan, a henchman
- John Tyrrell as Dirk, the "spearpoint heavy" (chief henchman)
- Lester Dorr as Gray

== Chapter titles ==
1. Shadow on the Wall
2. Trap of the Wasp
3. A City of Terror
4. The Secret Passage
5. The Devil's Playmate
6. The Fatal Crash
7. Gamble for Life
8. Across the Deadline
9. Terror Rides the Rails
10. The Unseen Monster
11. At the Stroke of Eight
12. The Reward of Treachery

_{Source:}

== See also ==
- List of film serials by year
- List of film serials by studio

| Preceded by Flying G-Men (1939) | Columbia Serial; Mandrake the Magician (1939) | Succeeded by Overland with Kit Carson (1939) |
