= Raffles (1930 film) =

1930 film

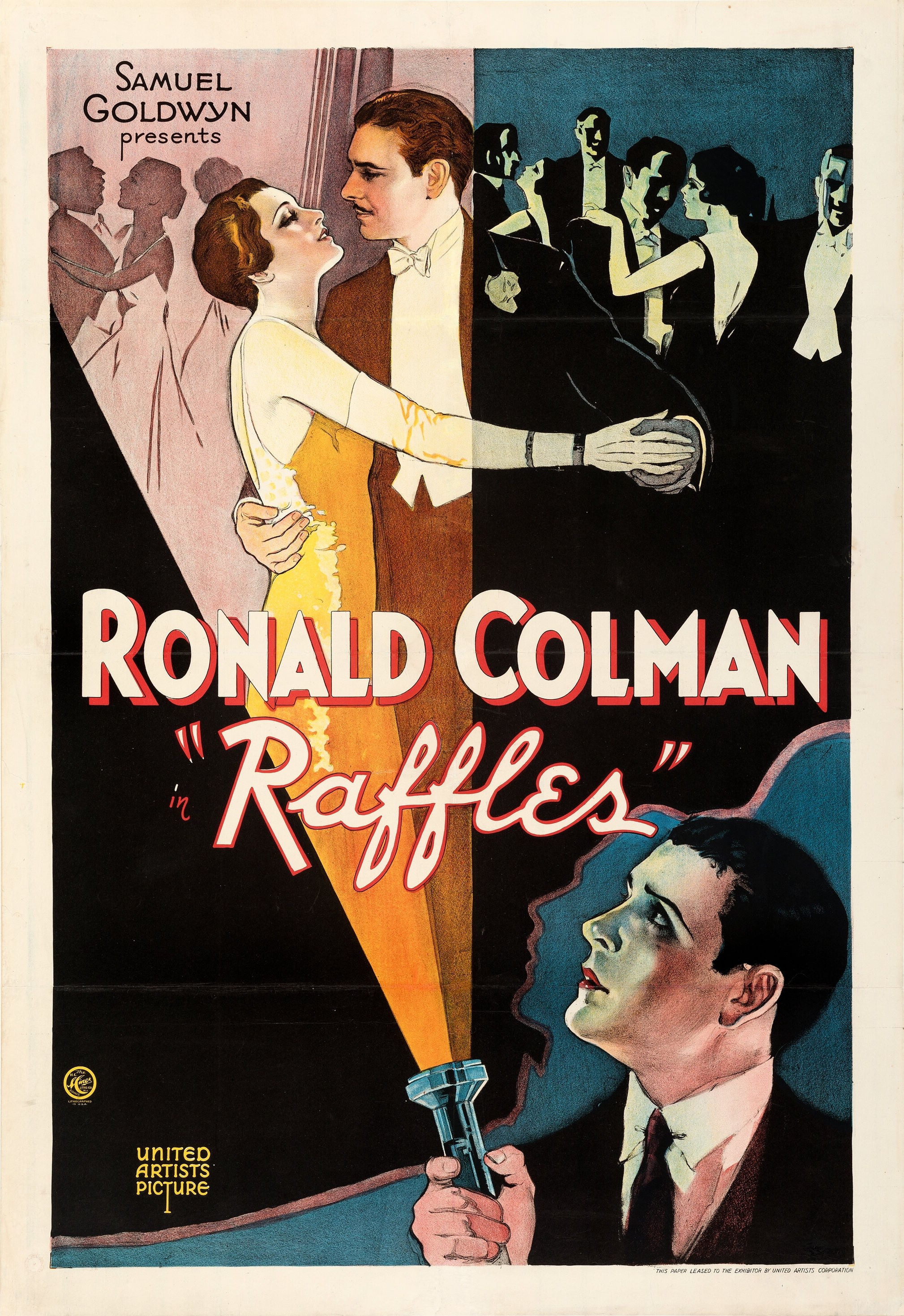
- Theatrical release one-sheet poster
- Directed by: George Fitzmaurice; Harry d'Abbadie d'Arrast (uncredited and replaced by Fitzmaurice)
- Written by: Sidney Howard
- Based on: The Amateur Cracksman; 1899 novel by E. W. Hornung Eugene Wiley Presbrey (1906 play)
- Produced by: Samuel Goldwyn
- Starring: Ronald Colman; Kay Francis
- Cinematography: George Barnes; Gregg Toland
- Edited by: Stuart Heisler
- Production company: Samuel Goldwyn Productions
- Distributed by: United Artists
- Release date: July 24, 1930
- Running time: 72 minutes
- Country: United States
- Language: English

Raffles is a 1930 American pre-Code comedy-mystery film produced by Samuel Goldwyn. It stars Ronald Colman as A.J. Raffles, a jewel thief, and Kay Francis as Gwen. It is based on the play Raffles, the Amateur Cracksman (1906) by E. W. Hornung and Eugene Wiley Presbrey, which was in turn adapted from the 1899 short story collection of the same name by Hornung.

Oscar Lagerstrom was nominated for an Academy Award for Best Sound Recording.

The story had been filmed previously as Raffles, the Amateur Cracksman (1917) with John Barrymore as Raffles, and again as Raffles, the Amateur Cracksman (1925) by Universal Studios. A 1939 Goldwyn produced version, again titled just Raffles, starred David Niven in the title role.

== Plot ==
Raffles (1930)

Cricketer A.J. Raffles is a jewel thief known as the "Amateur Cracksman", who falls in love with Gwen. Raffles gets engaged to Gwen and gifts her his latest theft, a diamond bracelet. He decides to give up his criminal ways until his friend Bunny attempts a suicide, due to his inability to repay gambling debt. Raffles offers to get him the needed money. He asks to join Bunny as a weekend guest of Lord and Lady Melrose, intending to steal the celebrated Melrose necklace.

Complications arise when a gang of thieves also has the same thing in mind. Tipped off to their plan, Inspector Mackenzie of Scotland Yard arrives at the Melrose estate with his men.

Unexpectedly, Gwen shows up there and joins the rolling party. Head burglar Crawshaw breaks into the house and succeeds in stealing the necklace, only to have Raffles take it away. The alarm is sounded and Crawshaw is caught empty-handed by the police, but remains silent, hoping to settle his score yet with Raffles.

When and the necklace is not found in the house, Mackenzie confines all the guests to it, then quickly changes his mind. Gwen, who has developed her own suspicions, overhears him tell one of his men that he intends to let Crawshaw escape, expecting the crook to lead him to Raffles. She follows Raffles back to London to warn him.

Mackenzie appears at Raffles’ home, finding Gwen in hiding in its guest room, “compromising” her reputation. She learns Raffles has the necklace, but not why. Crawshaw shows up on Raffles’ rooftop, drawing Mackenzie away in chase. Crenshaw then appears and takes Raffles at gunpoint. However, Raffles convinces him that it is too dangerous to flee with the necklace with all the policemen around and helps him escape.

Then, after a ruse put on by Raffles fails and Lord Melrose shows up, Makenzie accuses Raffles of being the Amateur Cracksman. Cornered and bound for jail, Raffles reminds Melrose of the 1,000 pound reward he offered for the necklace's return. Indicating only that Bunny could use that amount, he then has his nonplussed friend produce and hand it over.

Lord Melrose presses for the matter to be dropped, but MacKenzie reveals the warrant he has for Raffles’ arrest is for the theft of a diamond bracelet. Saying he is in no position to restore it the way he has the necklace, Raffles stands silent as Gwen removes it from her wrist and hands it to MacKenzie. She declares herself compromised in front of a distraught Lord Melrose, who leaves, dumbfounded and grumbling at the unsavory developments.

Springing another gambit, Raffles again outwits Mackenzie, and seeks to flee alone to the life of a perpetual fugitive. Gwen interrupts him, professes her love in spite of knowing what he has done, still without knowing why, and promises to accompany him wherever their journey may lead.

Arranging to meet her in Paris, Raffles makes a successful escape disguised in McKenzie’s frock coat and hat.

== Cast ==
- Ronald Colman as A.J. Raffles
- Kay Francis as Gwen
- David Torrence as Inspector McKenzie
- Frederick Kerr as Lord Harry Melrose
- Bramwell Fletcher as Bunny
- John Rogers as Crawshaw
- Wilson Benge as Barraclough
- Alison Skipworth as Lady Kitty Melrose
- Frances Dade as Ethel Crowley

== Production ==
According to Robert Osborne, host on Turner Classic Movies, Raffles was the last film that Samuel Goldwyn made in both a silent and talking version.

== Cultural references ==
The film is mentioned in an episode of Dad's Army, 'No Spring for Frazer', when several of the characters are breaking into a house.
