= The Pigskin Palooka =

- Directed by: Gordon Douglas
- Written by: Jack Jevne
- Produced by: Hal Roach
- Starring: see below
- Cinematography: Art Lloyd
- Edited by: William H. Ziegler
- Music by: Leroy Shield; Marvin Hatley
- Distributed by: MGM
- Release date: October 29, 1937
- Running time: 10' 41'
- Country: United States
- Language: English

The Pigskin Palooka is a 1937 Our Gang short comedy film directed by Gordon Douglas. It was the 159th Our Gang short to be released.

== Plot ==
Having written of his football heroics in military school, Alfalfa returns home to a hero's welcome. But the fact is that Alfalfa never played a game in his life and borrowed Rex's, a classmate and football player's uniform to take a picture, angering him as well. No sooner has he stepped off the train than his old pal Spanky, manager of the gang's football team, informs Alfalfa that he's been slated to be star player in an upcoming gridiron battle—which is to be staged within the next few hours. Alfalfa winds up winning the game in a total fluke, which Buckwheat and Porky helped cause.

== Cast ==
=== The Gang ===
- Carl Switzer as Alfalfa
- Darla Hood as Darla
- Eugene Lee as Porky
- George McFarland as Spanky
- Billie Thomas as Buckwheat
- Pete The Pup as himself

=== Additional cast ===
- Rex Downing as Cadet (photographer)
- Gary Jasgur as Junior (timekeeper)
- Cullen Johnson as Scorekeeper
- Dickie Jones as Spike
- Sidney Kibrick as Spike's sidekick
- Delmar Watson as Captain of the military academy's football team

=== Members of Spanky's team ===
Daniel Boone, John Collum, Charles Flickinger, Larry Harris, Paul Hilton, Darwood Kaye, Tommy McFarland, Donald Proffitt, Drew Roddy, Harold Switzer

=== Members of Spike's team ===
Hugh Chapman, Dix Davis, Barry Downing, Roger McGee, Fred Walburn, Robert Winkler

=== Game spectators and band players ===
Barry Downing, Bobby Callahan, Dix Davis, Floyd Fisher, Vincent Graeff, Payne B. Johnson, Henry Lee, Joe Levine, Priscilla Lyon, Drew Roddy, Norman Salling, Joe Straunch, Jr., Fred Walburn, Robert Winckler

== See also ==
- Our Gang filmography
