= Washee Ironee =

- Directed by: James Parrott
- Produced by: Hal Roach
- Cinematography: Francis Corby
- Edited by: Louis McManus
- Music by: Leroy Shield
- Distributed by: MGM
- Release date: September 29, 1934
- Running time: 15' 56"
- Country: United States
- Language: English

Washee Ironee is a 1934 Our Gang short comedy film directed by James Parrott. It was the 131st Our Gang short to be released.

== Plot ==
On the day that he is scheduled to perform a violin solo at a high-class bridge luncheon held by his social-climbing mother, rich kid Waldo opts instead to play football with the gang. With Waldo's help, the kids win the game, but his expensive clothes are covered with mud. Spanky declares that he and his pals are perfectly capable of washing Wally's clothes on their own—and the result is a major slapstick sequence, culminating in a typically outsized Hal Roach traffic jam.

== Notes ==
- Washee Ironee was directed by James Parrott, who directed many Laurel and Hardy shorts.
- It was Wally Albright's last episode. Wally left the gang on his own and to the dismay of Hal Roach, to return to normal life. He had served for a short time but got many lead roles, including one on this episode.
- It was also Billie Thomas' third episode but not yet as Buckwheat. (Buckwheat was originally a female character, portrayed by Carlena Beard and Willie Mae Taylor, who would morph into a boy by mid 1935.) Billie would appear in every succeeding Our Gang Hal Roach episode with the exception of Feed 'em and Weep in 1938. He also would appear in all 52 MGM Our Gang episodes until the series ended in 1944.
- This is also Tommy Bond's last episode for his first tenure with Our Gang. Bond returned two and a half years later as a recurring bully named Butch.
- When Spanky attempts to speak to the Asian Boy, he says "Ou-yay ash-way othes-clay" which is one of the first filmed uses of Pig Latin.
- This was edited by about five minutes on the syndicated Little Rascals television package beginning in 1971 due to stereotyping of African Americans and Asians. Only a few parts of the scenes were inserted back into the film when it aired on AMC.
- Also the film had no background music except for opening and closing titles but according to the book, Little Rascals the Life & Times of Our Gang, this was an oversight and Gus Meins meant to employ musical scoring on this episode which did not have as much dialogue as other films of the time.

== Cast ==
=== The Gang ===
- Wally Albright as Waldo/ Wally
- Matthew Beard as Stymie
- Scotty Beckett as Scotty
- Tommy Bond as Tommy
- George McFarland as Spanky
- Alvin Buckelew as Alvin
- Leonard Kibrick as Leonard
- Jerry Tucker as Jerry
- Pete the Pup as Himself

=== Additional cast ===
- Jackie Lynn Taylor as Jane
- Harry Lowe Jr. as Kid from Laundromat
- Tommy McFarland as Game spectator
- Billie Thomas as Game spectator
- Jackie White as Little girl
- John Collum as Football player
- Dickie Jones as Football player
- Hal Law Jr. as Football player
- Joe Levine as Football player
- Gene Reynolds as Football player
- Billy Lee Wolfstone as Football player
- Sam Adams as Butler
- Ernie Alexander as Pedestrian
- Gertrude Astor as Maid of Olympia
- Symona Boniface as Maid of Olympia
- Lester Dorr as Pedestrian
- Billy Gilbert as Sneeze dub (voice)
- Julia Griffith as Maid of Olympia
- James C. Morton as Policeman
- James Parrott as Man walking by laundry
- Tiny Sandford as Policeman directing traffic
- Ellinor Vanderveer as Waldo's mother
- Joe the Monkey as Monkey
- Tony Kales as Unconfirmed

== See also ==
- Our Gang filmography
