= General Spanky =

1936 film by Fred C. Newmeyer, Gordon Douglas

- Directed by: Fred Newmeyer; Gordon Douglas
- Written by: Richard Flournoy; John Guedel; Carl Harbaugh; Hal Yates
- Produced by: Hal Roach
- Starring: George McFarland; Phillips Holmes; Rosina Lawrence; Billie Thomas; Carl Switzer
- Cinematography: Art Lloyd; Walter Lundin
- Music by: Marvin Hatley
- Production company: Hal Roach Studios
- Distributed by: Metro-Goldwyn-Mayer
- Release date: December 11, 1936
- Running time: 71 minutes
- Country: United States
- Language: English

General Spanky is a 1936 American comedy film produced by Hal Roach. A spin-off of Roach's popular Our Gang short subjects, the film stars George McFarland, Phillips Holmes, Rosina Lawrence, Billie Thomas and Carl Switzer. Directed by Fred Newmeyer and Gordon Douglas, it was originally released to theaters on December 11, 1936, by Metro-Goldwyn-Mayer (MGM).

This film, a Civil War period piece, was intended as an experiment to determine if Roach could move Our Gang into features, as the double feature and block booking were slowly smothering his short subjects production. The film was a box-office disappointment and, after another year of shorts production, Roach ended up selling the Our Gang unit to MGM in May 1938.

When Roach bought the rights to the back catalog of Our Gang films he had produced from MGM in 1949, he did not buy back the rights to General Spanky. The film was part of the pre-May 1986 MGM catalog acquired in 1986 by Turner Entertainment Co., which holds the rights today as a subsidiary of Warner Bros. General Spanky was released on VHS and LaserDisc in 1991. In 2016, it was released on DVD in Region 1 by Warner Bros. via their Warner Archive Collection.

== Plot ==
Spanky (George McFarland), Alfalfa (Carl Switzer), Buckwheat (Billie Thomas) and others form an army called "The Royal Protection of Women and Children Regiment Club of the World and Mississippi River". The group sees unexpected action when Union troops approach, engaging in battles more farcical than fierce. Using clowning tactics instead of military tactics, the kids stop the advance . . . and later save an adult friend from the firing squad.

== Cast ==
=== Principal cast ===
- Spanky McFarland as Spanfield George 'Spanky' Leonard
- Phillips Holmes as Marshall "Marsh" Valient
- Ralph Morgan as Yankee General
- Irving Pichel as Capt. Simmons, The Gambler
- Rosina Lawrence as Louella Blanchard
- Billie "Buckwheat" Thomas as Buckwheat
- Carl "Alfalfa" Switzer as Alfalfa
- Hobart Bosworth as Col. Blanchard
- Robert Middlemass as Overseer
- James Burtis as Boat Captain
- Louise Beavers as Cornelia
- William Best as Henry, the lazy slave

=== Additional cast ===
- Harold Switzer as Harold
- Jerry Tucker as Jerry
- Flayette Roberts as Flayette—Gang kid in Army
- John Collum as Our Gang member
- Rex Downing as Our Gang member
- Dickie De Nuet as Our Gang member
- Ernie Alexander as Friend of Marshall
- Hooper Atchley as Slavemaster
- Harry Bernard as Man on the boat
- Jack Daugherty as General's Aid
- Walter Gregory as Capt. Haden
- Karl Hackett as First mate
- Henry Hall as Slavemaster
- Ham Kinsey as Man with paint on shoes
- Frank LaRue as Slavemaster
- Richard R. Neil as Col. Parrish
- Buddy Roosevelt as Lt. Johnson
- Jeffrey Sayre as Friend of Marshall
- Carl Voss as Second Lieutenant
- Jack Cooper as Bit role
- Alex Finlayson as Bit role
- Jack Hill as Bit role
- Portia Lanning as Bit role
- Harry Strang as Bit role
- Slim Whittaker as Bit role
- Von the Dog as Von

== Awards ==
The film was nominated for an Academy Award in the category Best Sound Recording (Elmer A. Raguse).

== See also ==
- List of films and television shows about the American Civil War
