= Feed 'em and Weep =

- Title card
- Directed by: Gordon Douglas
- Produced by: Hal Roach
- Cinematography: Norbert Brodine
- Edited by: William H. Ziegler
- Music by: Leroy Shield; Marvin Hatley
- Distributed by: Metro-Goldwyn-Mayer
- Release date: May 7, 1938
- Running time: 10' 42"
- Country: United States
- Language: English

Feed 'em and Weep is a 1938 Our Gang short comedy film directed by Gordon Douglas. It was the 166th Our Gang short to be released.

== Plot ==
It is Mr. Hood's birthday, and he has been eagerly anticipating a quiet dinner at home with his family, his lunch consisted only of "a lettuce sandwich on gluten bread." Darla then mentions that she has invited her friends to the celebration: Alfalfa, Porky, and Philip. The well-meaning trio drive Mr. Hood to distraction with loud and interminable choruses of "Happy Birthday, Mr. Hood." Then they present their ill-conceived presents: a frog, a duck, and a cat. When the kids are not arguing over their favorite comic-strip characters, they are busily devouring Mr. Hood's birthday dinner. Mr. Hood, disgusted over the whole affair, declares he is going out to get a bite to eat and leaves.

== Notes ==
Regular Our Gang member Billie "Buckwheat" Thomas does not appear in Feed 'em and Weep due to a short illness. In for Buckwheat is Philip Hurlic, a prominent African-American child actor of the time. Hurlic has bit and background parts in several other Our Gang shorts and featured roles in films such as The Adventures of Tom Sawyer (1938) and Hal Roach's own Zenobia (1939).

Feed 'em and Weep is also the first of five Our Gang shorts produced without one of the series' stars, George "Spanky" McFarland. McFarland had actually exited Our Gang following the previous entry, Came the Brawn, but would return to the series after its transition to MGM later in 1938.

== Cast ==
=== The Gang ===
- Darla Hood as Darla Hood
- Eugene Lee as Porky
- Carl Switzer as Alfalfa
- Philip Hurlic as Philip
- Gary Jasgur as Junior
- Leonard Landy as Percy

=== Additional cast ===
- Johnny Arthur as Johnny Hood
- Wilma Cox as Mrs. Hood

== See also ==
- Our Gang filmography
