= The Pinch Singer =

1936 film

- Title card
- Directed by: Fred C. Newmeyer
- Produced by: Hal Roach
- Starring: Darla Hood; Eugene Lee; George McFarland; Carl Switzer; Billie Thomas; Jerry Tucker; Harold Switzer; Marianne Edwards; Sidney Kibrick; Pete The Pup
- Cinematography: Art Lloyd
- Edited by: Louis McManus
- Music by: Marvin Hatley; Leroy Shield
- Distributed by: Metro-Goldwyn-Mayer
- Release date: January 4, 1936
- Running time: 17 minutes
- Country: United States
- Language: English

The Pinch Singer is a 1936 Our Gang short comedy film directed by Fred C. Newmeyer. It was the 142nd Our Gang short to be released.

== Plot ==
The gang's Eagles Club holds auditions for a performer to send to a local amateur radio talent contest, with $50 going to the winner. Despite Alfalfa's repeated attempts to upstage his competition, Darla is chosen to represent the club at the talent contest after her performance of "I'm in the Mood for Love." However, when Darla fails to show up at the radio station, Spanky runs frantically to look for her, while Alfalfa decides to take it upon himself and take Darla's place on the radio program.

Alfalfa begins crooning "I'm in the Mood for Love." When the gang hears Alfalfa on the radio, they race to the pay phones at the nearest drugstore and rig the contest, calling in vote after vote for Alfalfa. Spanky returns to the station with Darla just as Alfalfa finishes the performance. As Spanky begins to berate Alfalfa for acting on his own, the emcee informs them that Alfalfa won the $50 prize. Suddenly, Spanky has nothing but confidence in Alfalfa's future singing efforts at which Alfalfa abruptly silences with a gong.

== Cast ==
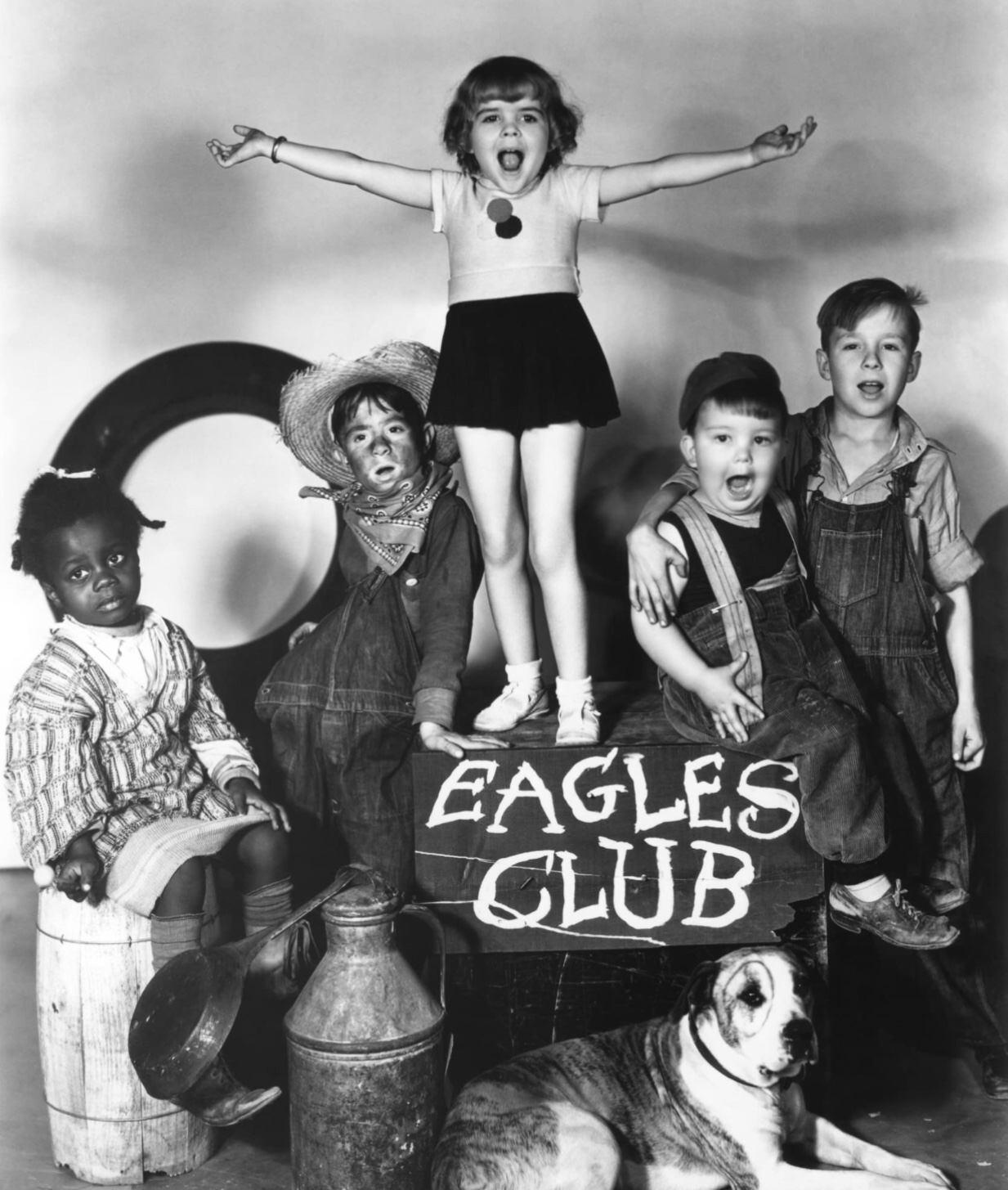
Publicity still for The Pinch Singer

=== The Gang ===
- Darla Hood as Darla
- Eugene Lee as Porky
- George McFarland as Spanky
- Carl Switzer as Alfalfa
- Billie Thomas as Buckwheat
- Billy Minderhout as Boy who recites
- Harold Switzer as Harold
- Jerry Tucker as Jerry
- Marianne Edwards as Marianne
- Sidney Kibrick as Eagles Club member
- Leonard Kibrick as Eagles Club member (scenes deleted)
- Donald Proffitt as Eagles Club member (scenes deleted)
- Pete The Pup as himself

=== Additional Eagles Club members ===
Daniel Boone, John Collum, Rex Downing, Kay Frye, Barbara Goodrich, Paul Hilton, Peggy Lynch, Dickie De Nuet

=== Additional cast ===
- Bud Murray Dancers as Famous Broadway Artists
- Gloria Brown as Famous Broadway Artists dancer
- Betsy Gay as Famous Broadway Artists dancer
- Dickie Jones as Famous Broadway Artists dancer
- Jackie Morrow as Plantation Trio member
- Warner, Walt, and George Weidler as Saxophone players
- Chet Brandenburg as Audience extra
- Eddie Craven as Elevator boy
- Blair Davies as Radio announcer
- Gail Goodson as Information girl
- Charlie Hall as Druggist and audience extra
- Marvin Hatley as Marvin, music conductor
- Bill Madsen as Page
- Chet Brandenberg as Audience member
- Lester Dorr as Audience member
- Junior Cavanaugh as Undetermined role
- Betty Cox as Undetermined role
- Dorian Johnson as Undetermined role
- Harry McCabe as Undetermined role
- Delmar Watson as Undetermined roleGeorge William Weidler

== See also ==
- Our Gang filmography
