= The First Round-Up =

1934 film

- Film poster
- Directed by: Gus Meins
- Produced by: Hal Roach
- Starring: Wally Albright; Matthew Beard; George McFarland; Scotty Beckett; Tommy Bond; Pete the Pup
- Cinematography: Francis Corby
- Edited by: Ray Snyder
- Music by: Leroy Shield
- Distributed by: MGM
- Release date: May 5, 1934
- Running time: 18 minutes
- Country: United States
- Language: English

The First Round-Up is a 1934 Our Gang short comedy film directed by Gus Meins. It was the 128th Our Gang short to be released.

== Plot ==
Wally Albright and the gang have planned for an elaborate camping trip for a week at Cherry Creek, but Wally's father is convinced his boy and the others will be back by nightfall. Meanwhile, Wally and Stymie try to shoo off Spanky and Scotty rather than to have to drag them along. Their reasoning is that the kids would never survive the trip, but upon arrival, Spanky and Scotty are already there after having hitchhiked their way to the site. This results in the theme of the trip with the younger boys reminding the (slightly) older boys of their reluctance to have them around them. The little kids are also the only ones who planned far enough ahead to bring food, sharing it with the big kids in one big mob. As things get darker, the big kids get scared as the younger ones get excited, making shadows from their lamp which adds to the thunder and lightning passing over, inadvertently scaring off the older kids. Left alone, Scotty and Spanky are by themselves as their lamp is carried by a turtle under it into the creek, where it goes out. Spooked, they jump into their sleeping bags and stick their legs out after being hit by lightning, to race after the big kids running home. Pete witnesses this and gets spooked.

== Cast ==
=== The Gang ===
- Wally Albright as Wally
- Matthew Beard as Stymie
- Scotty Beckett as Scotty
- Tommy Bond as Tommy
- George McFarland as Spanky
- Willie Mae Taylor (a girl) as Buckwheat (as a female character)
- Billy Wolfstone as Marvin
- Cullen Johnson as Our Gang member
- Philbrook Lyons as Our Gang member
- Pete the Pup as himself

=== Additional cast ===
- Jacqueline Taylor as Jane
- Billie Thomas as boy emptying the gang's canteens. (Billie Thomas would later become famous for playing "Buckwheat" when the character's gender was changed from female to male.)
- Billy Bletcher as Wally's father
- Zoila Conan as Wally's mother

== See also ==
- Our Gang filmography
