= Shiver My Timbers =

1931 film

- Title card
- Directed by: Robert F. McGowan
- Written by: H. M. Walker
- Produced by: Robert F. McGowan; Hal Roach
- Starring: Billy Gilbert; June Marlowe
- Cinematography: Art Lloyd
- Edited by: Richard C. Currier
- Music by: Leroy Shield; Marvin Hatley
- Distributed by: MGM
- Release date: October 10, 1931
- Running time: 21 minutes
- Country: United States
- Language: English

Shiver My Timbers is a 1931 Our Gang short comedy film directed by Robert F. McGowan. It was the 109th Our Gang short to be released.

== Plot ==
A loud sea captain (Billy Gilbert) tells violent stories about adventures out on the sea as pirates. The gang is playing hookey from school in order to hear his stories. Miss Crabtree (June Marlowe) finds where they are and decides to team up with the sea captain to teach the kids a lesson and scare them from ever wanting to be pirates.

The sea captain invites the gang back that night to become pirates. When they board the ship, the sea captain puts on a show and scares the kids. He acts mean and pretends to be sending other pirates overboard. Miss Crabtree is also there and pretending that she would be next to walk the plank. The gang then decides they want to go back to school and take the sea captain seriously.

However, during a staged "raid" on their ship, the children turn the tables on the crewmen.

== Cast ==
=== The Gang ===
- Sherwood Bailey as Spud
- Matthew Beard as Stymie
- Dorothy DeBorba as Dorothy
- Bobby Hutchins as Wheezer
- George Ernest as Georgie
- Jerry Tucker as Jerry
- Pete the Pup as himself

=== Additional cast ===
- Carlena Beard as Stymie's sister
- Harry Bernard as Cook
- Dick Gilbert as Dick, one of the crew
- Billy Gilbert as The sea captain
- Jack Hill as One of the crew
- June Marlowe as Miss Crabtree
- Charles Oelze as Crew member with funny glasses
- Cy Slocum as Cy, one of the crew

== Memorable quote ==
According to Leonard Maltin, one of the most memorable lines in the history of the movies was spoken in this short. Gilbert has called two of his crew over for mock abuse to scare the kids. He bellows at Harry Bernard, "What are you two doing over there?" Bernard answers, "We don't know!"

== Notes ==
In 1971, the first several minutes, where Billy Gilbert is telling the gang wild pirate stories were edited out due to perceived violence and reinstated in 2001 on prints shown on American Movie Classics until 2003. It was not available on home video VHS tapes until 1994 when it was released on the first round of volumes issued by Cabin Fever.

== See also ==
- Our Gang filmography
