= Hi'-Neighbor! =

1934 Our Gang short film

- Directed by: Gus Meins
- Produced by: Hal Roach
- Starring: Wally Albright; Matthew Beard
- Cinematography: Art Lloyd
- Edited by: Louis McManus
- Music by: LeRoy Shield
- Distributed by: MGM
- Release date: March 3, 1934
- Running time: 17' 39"
- Country: United States
- Language: English

Hi'-Neighbor! is a 1934 Our Gang short comedy film directed by Gus Meins. Produced by Hal Roach and released to theaters by Metro-Goldwyn-Mayer, it was the 126th Our Gang short to be released and Meins' first series entry as director.

== Plot ==
While sailing their toy tugboat in a puddle outside their house, Wally and Spanky notice a moving van with a riding toy fire engine passing through the neighborhood. They quickly round up the rest of the gang and follow the moving van to its destination. The owner of the fire truck, a snobbish rich kid named Jerry, comes out to find a dozen strange children playing with his fire engine and shoos them all away, refusing to trade any sorts of collateral (pocket knives, gratitude) for even so little as a ride. Enter Wally's girlfriend Jane, to whom Jerry, however, is quick to offer a ride. Wally tries to dissuade Jane from riding with Jerry by telling her that the gang has a fire engine of its own, big enough for all the gang's members to ride in. Jane accepts Wally's invitation to ride in his (currently non-existent) fire engine after she returns from her ride with Jerry.

Wally, Stymie, and the gang quickly begin building a makeshift fire engine of their own; "borrowing" wheels, hoses, plywood, and other raw materials from around the neighborhood. As the older kids work on the fire engine, little Spanky and Scotty find themselves forced out of the proceedings, and sit on the sidelines giving commentary among themselves on the gang's progress. Unbeknownst to the gang, Jerry sneaks over to the gang's barn with Jane in tow, hoping to prove that the gang does not have a fire engine. He quickly flees in embarrassment, however, when a drill from the other side of the barn door strips him of his pants.

The unwieldy results of their labor fail to impress Jane, whom Jerry successfully coaxes into another ride with him. Undaunted, the gang follows them, and Jerry challenges them to a race to the bottom of a long, steep hill. Not long after the start of the race, the gang's fire engine loses its brake (a 2x4 nailed between the wheels), and Jerry fears that the gang might very well run him over. Halfway down the hill, Jerry bails out of his fire engine into a lawn, leaving Jane alone to crash in the next lot over; in retaliation for being abandoned, Jane activates a water sprinkler that drenches Jerry. While the gang cheers in victory, their fire engine suddenly veers onto the sidewalk, where they knock over several pedestrians and ride straight through a hedge, which tears their clothes and causes them to emerge from the other side in their underwear (except for Spanky, who proceeds to take his clothes off).

== Cast ==
=== The Gang ===
- Wally Albright as Wally
- Matthew Beard as Stymie
- Scotty Beckett as Scotty
- Tommy Bond as Tommy
- George McFarland as Spanky
- Marvin Strin as Bubbles
- Tommy Bupp as Our Gang member
- Donald Proffitt as Our Gang member
- Pete The Pup as himself

=== Additional cast ===
- Jackie Lynn Taylor as Jane
- Jerry Tucker as Jerry, the rich kid
- Jean Aulbach as Donald's little sister
- Bobbie Beard as Cotton
- Harry Bernard as Moonshiner filling crock
- Charlie Hall as Window-washer
- Tiny Sandford as First mover
- Tiny Ward as Jack, second mover
- Tony Kales as Undetermined role

== Production notes ==
Hi-Neighbor! was the first Our Gang film produced after the series' four-month hiatus, necessitated by George "Spanky" McFarland's unavailability. While on loan to Paramount to appear in Miss Fane's Baby Is Stolen (1934), McFarland caught whooping cough, but his parents allowed him to work while sick. As a result, McFarland gave the disease to his juvenile co-star Baby LeRoy, forcing a shutdown in production. As punishment to McFarland's parents, the Los Angeles Board of Education suspended George McFarland's work permit for ninety days, resulting in a four-month gap between the production of Wild Poses in August 1933 and Hi'-Neighbor! in January 1934.

Between Wild Poses and Hi'-Neighbor, several changes were made to the Our Gang company. Producer-director Robert F. McGowan, who had been with the series from its beginnings in 1921, was worn out from the strain of working with child actors and left Hal Roach Studios to direct features at Paramount. He was replaced by Gus Meins, a veteran director who had worked on another series of shorts starring children, the Buster Brown films, during the silent era. Meins' approach would be different from McGowan's, as his films adhered closer to a prepared script with less room for improvisation or unrelated gags.

Also joining Our Gang at this time were several new child actors, in particular Wally Albright, Scotty Beckett, and Jackie Lynn Taylor. Albright, already a veteran actor at age eight, had appeared briefly in the Our Gang short Choo-Choo! in 1932. He would appear in four more Our Gang shorts as the kids' leader in 1934. Four-year-old Beckett made his film debut in Hi'-Neighbor!, and was cast as Spanky's sidekick, a role he would continue in until mid-1935. Taylor appeared in five Our Gang shorts in 1934; Jane Withers was originally cast in her role for Hi'-Neighbor! before Withers backed out to appear in the feature Bright Eyes with Shirley Temple.

== See also ==
- Our Gang filmography
