= Three Men in a Tub =

1938 film

- Film poster
- Directed by: Nate Watt
- Produced by: Hal Roach
- Cinematography: Art Lloyd
- Edited by: William H. Ziegler
- Music by: Leroy Shield; Marvin Hatley
- Distributed by: MGM
- Release date: March 26, 1938
- Running time: 10 minutes
- Country: United States
- Language: English

Three Men in a Tub is a 1938 Our Gang short comedy film directed by Nate Watt. It was the 164th Our Gang short to be released.

== Cast ==
=== The Gang ===
- Darla Hood as Darla
- Eugene Lee as Porky
- George McFarland as Spanky
- Carl Switzer as Alfalfa
- Billie Thomas as Buckwheat

=== Additional cast ===
- Darwood Kaye as Waldo
- John Collum as Race starter
- Gary Jasgur as Gary 'Junior'
- Harold Switzer as Kid who falls in the water
- Sheila Brown as Extra
- Audrey Carol as Extra
- Tommy McFarland as Extra
- Jerry Tucker as Extra

== See also ==
- Our Gang filmography
