= Anniversary Trouble =

- Directed by: Gus Meins
- Produced by: Hal Roach
- Cinematography: Francis Corby
- Edited by: Bert Jordan
- Music by: Leroy Shield
- Distributed by: MGM
- Release date: January 19, 1935
- Running time: 18' 58"
- Country: United States
- Language: English

Anniversary Trouble is a 1935 Our Gang short comedy film directed by Gus Meins. It was the 134th Our Gang short to be released.

== Plot ==
Spanky's appointment as treasurer of the Ancient and Honery Order of Woodchucks occurs on the same day as his parents' wedding anniversary. Spanky's father (Johnny Arthur) puts money in an envelope as an anniversary gift for his wife (Claudia Dell), then absent-mindedly uses the envelope as a bookmark.

Spanky's mother sees Spanky hide the gang's club money in a cookie jar and jumps to the conclusion that Spanky stole her gift envelope. She takes that money and shows it to Spanky's father who also jumps to the wrong conclusion. Spanky is looking for the money and cannot find it. Minutes later, the other Woodchucks demand the return of their "dough," as the club had just broken up. Spanky cannot accommodate them. Spanky's father calls the maid/nanny and tells her to send him to his dad's office for punishment immediately. Spanky is unable to leave because the gang is blocking the exits out of his house. Spanky then tries to sneak out by painting himself in blackface and dressing up like Buckwheat, the maid/nanny's son. That plan is also foiled and then Spanky's parents return home.

Spanky puts the book with the anniversary money in his back pocket to protect himself from a spanking. His father discovers the gift envelope in the book and realises his mistake. So that his mother thinks the spanking is being carried out and can remain unaware of the mistake, Spanky's father has Spanky spank him instead and has Spanky make the groaning noises. Spanky's mother though catches them leading to a wild and wooly conclusion wherein Spanky's dad is duly punished for his faulty memory.

== Notes ==
The television broadcast version of Anniversary Trouble has been radically edited, removing the sequence in which Spanky dons blackface to disguise himself as Billy "Buckwheat" Thomas due to perceived racism against African Americans. It was only partially restored on the 2001 to 2003 showings over AMC. It was finally available unedited on VHS home video from the early 1980s until the late 1990s.

== Cast ==
=== The Gang ===
- George McFarland as Spanky
- Matthew Beard as Stymie
- Scotty Beckett as Scotty
- Billie Thomas as Buckwheat
- Alvin Buckelew as Alvin
- Leonard Kibrick as Leonard
- Jerry Tucker as Jerry
- Sidney Kibrick as Our Gang member
- Harry Harvey Jr. as Our Gang member
- Donald Proffitt as Our Gang member
- Merrill Strong as Our Gang member
- Pete the Pup as himself

=== Additional cast ===
- Johnny Arthur as John, Spanky's father
- Claudia Dell as Spanky's mother
- Hattie McDaniel as Mandy, the maid
- Cecelia Murray as Girl with doll
- Tony Kales as Undetermined role

== See also ==
- Our Gang filmography
