= Canned Fishing =

- Directed by: Gordon Douglas
- Produced by: Hal Roach
- Starring: George McFarland; Carl Switzer; Eugene Lee; Billie Thomas
- Cinematography: Art Lloyd
- Edited by: William H. Ziegler
- Music by: Leroy Shield; Marvin Hatley
- Distributed by: MGM
- Release date: February 12, 1938
- Running time: 10' 42"
- Country: United States
- Language: English

Canned Fishing is a 1938 Our Gang short comedy film directed by Gordon Douglas. It was the 162nd Our Gang short to be released.

== Plot ==
Again concocting an elaborate hooky-playing scheme, Spanky places a block of ice on the chest of his pal Alfalfa, who spent the night with him at his house. The strategy this time is to convince their mothers that Alfalfa has a bad cold or the flu, and that Spanky must remain by his side to nurse him back to health. In fact, the boys plan to go fishing the moment their mothers' backs are turned—and the scheme might have worked, had Buckwheat and Porky not spilled the beans to Spanky's mother.

Vowing to teach the boys a lesson, she orders Spanky and Alfalfa to remain in the house all day and look after Spanky's kid brother Junior. This turns out to be a major mistake when, while trying to clean Junior's clothes, the boys end up locked in a steam cabinet, while poor Buckwheat finds himself stuck in the washing machine's rinse cycle. When Spanky's mother returns, the three boys run to school.

== Cast ==
=== The Gang ===
- George McFarland as Spanky
- Carl Switzer as Alfalfa
- Billie Thomas as Buckwheat
- Eugene Lee as Porky

=== Additional cast ===
- Gary Jasgur as Junior
- Wilma Cox as Spanky's mother

== See also ==
- Our Gang filmography
