= Mama's Little Pirate =

- Directed by: Gus Meins
- Produced by: Hal Roach
- Starring: George McFarland; Scotty Beckett; Matthew Beard; Jerry Tucker; Billie Thomas
- Cinematography: Art Lloyd
- Edited by: Bert Jordan
- Music by: Marvin Hatley; Leroy Shield
- Distributed by: MGM
- Release date: November 3, 1934
- Running time: 17' 51"
- Country: United States
- Language: English

Mama's Little Pirate is a 1934 Our Gang short comedy film directed by Gus Meins. It was the 132nd Our Gang short to be released.

== Plot ==
Spanky's father reads a newspaper article about treasures found at a nearby cave during breakfast with the family. This inspires Spanky to explore another nearby cave with the gang for more treasures. The cave is too dark so Spanky goes back home to get a flashlight. Spanky's mother catches him and forbids him to hunt for the treasure, going as far as to send him to his room when he refuses to listen.

Confined to his room, Spanky falls asleep and in his dream argues with his "inner self", who advises him to disobey his mother and join the rest of the gang in their search for buried treasure. Though the kids miraculously unearth a fortune in gold and jewels, their triumph nearly turns to disaster when they encounter a surly giant (Tex Madsen). During the height of the trouble they've found, Spanky wakes up from his dream.

== Notes ==
Mama's Little Pirate is the first Our Gang fantasy outing. The film was enhanced by Leroy Shield's unique background music composition "Cascadia", originally written for the "Boy Friends" comedy Air Tight (1931).

Leroy Shield's music composition was "Good Old Days" in the opening titles and "We're going to arrowhead" was in the end title.

The cave was a set from the 1934 film Babes in Toyland, which was also directed by Gus Meins.

== Cast ==
=== The Gang ===
- Matthew Beard as Stymie
- Scotty Beckett as Scotty
- George McFarland as Spanky
- Billie Thomas as Buckwheat
- Jerry Tucker as Jerry
- Marylin Bourne as Little girl
- Gilbert Hullett as Our Gang member
- Paul Rodriguez as Our Gang member

=== Additional cast ===
- Billy Bletcher as Giant (voice)
- Claudia Dell as Spanky's mother
- Tex Madsen as Giant
- Joe Young as Spanky's father (as Joe Young)

== See also ==
- Our Gang filmography
