= John Collum =

American actor (1926–1962)

John "Uh Huh" Collum
- Collum in Mush and Milk, 1933
- Born: June 29, 1926; Chicago, Illinois, US
- Died: August 28, 1962 (aged 36); Los Angeles, California, US
- Other name: Uh-Huh
- Occupation: Child actor
- Years active: 1932–1962

John Keith Collum (June 29, 1926 — August 28, 1962) was an American child actor. He appeared in many Our Gang films of the 1930s as the character Uh-Huh.

== Career ==
Born in Chicago, Illinois, Collum was the son of Hal Roach's casting director, Joseph Collum. He first appeared in the 1932 short, A Lad An' A Lamp. He was never a regular cast member and portrayed a character named Uh-Huh. Uh-Huh answered most of his questions with a drawn-out "Uh-huuuuuh". After 1933, Collum was used as an extra whenever a large group of children was needed. He appeared in many films from 1934 to 1938. His final appearance in the Our Gang series is in the 1938 short Three Men in a Tub.

== Death ==
Two months past his 36th birthday, Collum died of a heart attack in Los Angeles. He is interred in the Valhalla Memorial Park Cemetery in North Hollywood.

== Our Gang filmography ==
- A Lad an' a Lamp (1932)
- Free Wheeling (1932)
- Fish Hooky (1933)
- Forgotten Babies (1933)
- Mush and Milk (1933)
- Washee Ironee (1934)
- Little Sinner (1935)
- The Lucky Corner (1936)
- The Pinch Singer (1936)
- Arbor Day (1936)
- Bored of Education (1936)
- General Spanky (1936)
- Too Two Young (1936)
- Pay as You Exit (1936)
- Spooky Hooky (1936)
- Glove Taps (1937)
- Hearts Are Thumps (1937)
- Rushin' Ballet (1937)
- Fishy Tales (1937)
- Framing Youth (1937)
- The Pigskin Palooka (1937)
- Mail and Female (1937)
- Our Gang Follies of 1938 (1937)
- Three Men in a Tub (1938)

== Solo filmography ==
- Tom Brown's School Days (1940)
- Force of Evil (1948)
- The Girls of Pleasure Island (1953)
- The Music Man (1962; final film appearance - uncredited)

== Bibliography ==
- Maltin, Leonard; Bann, Richard W. (1992) [1977]. The Little Rascals: The Life and Times of Our Gang. Photographs: Gene Korman and Bud Graves (Revised ed.). New York: Crown. ISBN 0-517-58325-9.
