= Bear Facts (film) =

1938 film

- Title card from the film
- Directed by: Gordon Douglas
- Produced by: Hal Roach
- Cinematography: Art Lloyd
- Edited by: William H. Ziegler
- Music by: Leroy Shield; Marvin Hatley
- Distributed by: MGM
- Release date: March 5, 1938
- Running time: 11 minutes
- Country: United States
- Language: English

Bear Facts is a 1938 Our Gang short comedy film directed by Gordon Douglas. It was the 163rd Our Gang short to be released.

== Plot ==
In an effort to impress Darla (Darla Hood), Alfalfa (Carl Switzer) tells her that he is a famous bear trainer. Although he knows that Darla's father owns a circus, he does not know he owns a bear costume.

== Cast ==
=== The Gang ===
- Darla Hood as Darla King
- Eugene Lee as Porky
- George McFarland as Spanky
- Carl Switzer as Alfalfa
- Billie Thomas as Buckwheat
- George the Monkey as Elmer

=== Additional cast ===
- Jack Pepper as Darla's father
- Ed Brandenberg as Fifi
- Jack Baxley as Expressman
- Al Pilario as Expressman
- Wilbur Pike as Bear
- Cooper Smith as Bear

== See also ==
- Our Gang filmography
