= Gary Jasgur =

American actor (1935–1994)

- Born: Melvyn Gary Jasgur; November 8, 1935; Los Angeles, California U.S.
- Died: August 22, 1994 (aged 58); California; U.S.
- Other name: Mel Jasgar
- Occupation: Film actor
- Years active: 1937-1972

Gary Jasgur (November 8, 1935 – August 22, 1994) was an American former child actor, most notable for appearing in the Our Gang short film series from 1937 to 1939.

== Career ==
Dark-haired Jasgur was cast as "Junior", the infant brother of either Spanky or Darla. In his two years with the Our Gang series, Jasgur did not have a single word of dialogue, yet managed to make life miserable for his older sibling. He was memorable as the pint-sized, banana-eating timekeeper in The Pigskin Palooka and billed as the "world's smallest man" in Clown Princes. Perhaps his most notable role was in Canned Fishing when Spanky and Alfalfa are desperately trying to get out of babysitting little Junior.

In 1939, Jasgur left the series "before he knew he had been in it," as film critic Leonard Maltin commented.

== Adult life and death ==
Gary was actually Jasgur's middle name, and in high school he preferred to be called Mel. Jasgur married in 1956.

As an adult, Jasgur operated a small retail spa business in Southern California. He died on August 22, 1994, at age 58 in California, and is survived by four children and ten grandchildren.
