= William Ziegler (film editor) =

American film editor (1909–1977)

William H. Ziegler
- Born: September 4, 1909; Philadelphia, Pennsylvania, U.S.
- Died: July 2, 1977 (aged 67); Encino, Los Angeles, California, U.S.
- Other names: William M. Ziegler; Wm. H. Ziegler
- Occupation: Film editor
- Years active: 1931–1975
- Children: 3 daughters

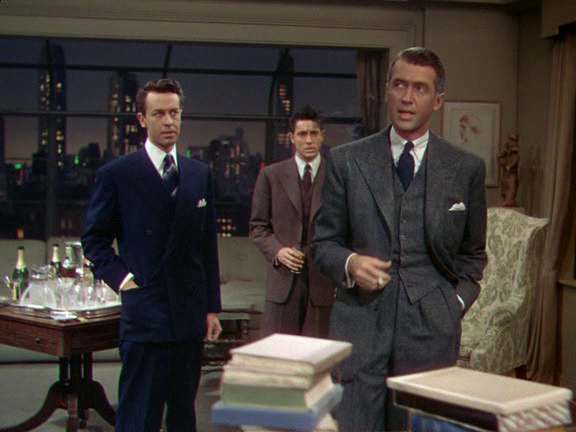
Cropped screenshot of James Stewart from the trailer for the film Rope.

William H. Ziegler (September 4, 1909 – July 2, 1977) was an American film editor. He started his career at Hal Roach Studios in 1931, where he edited short films for four years, including several of the Our Gang shorts. He edited over 100 films during his long career, most notably Strangers on a Train (1951), Auntie Mame (1958) The Music Man (1962) and My Fair Lady (1964). He was an Academy Awards nominee for his editing of the last three. The last film he edited was McQ (1974). Before the Academy Awards were broadcast on television, he used to edit the clips presented during the ceremony. He died after a long illness at home in in Encino, California. He was survived by his wife and three daughters.

== Oscar nominations ==
All three nominations were in the category of Best Film Editing

- 31st Academy Awards-Nominated for Auntie Mame. Lost to Gigi.
- 35th Academy Awards-Nominated for The Music Man. Lost to Lawrence of Arabia.
- 37th Academy Awards-Nominated for My Fair Lady. Lost to Mary Poppins.
