= Nan Halperin =

Russian-born American singing comedian (1898–1963)

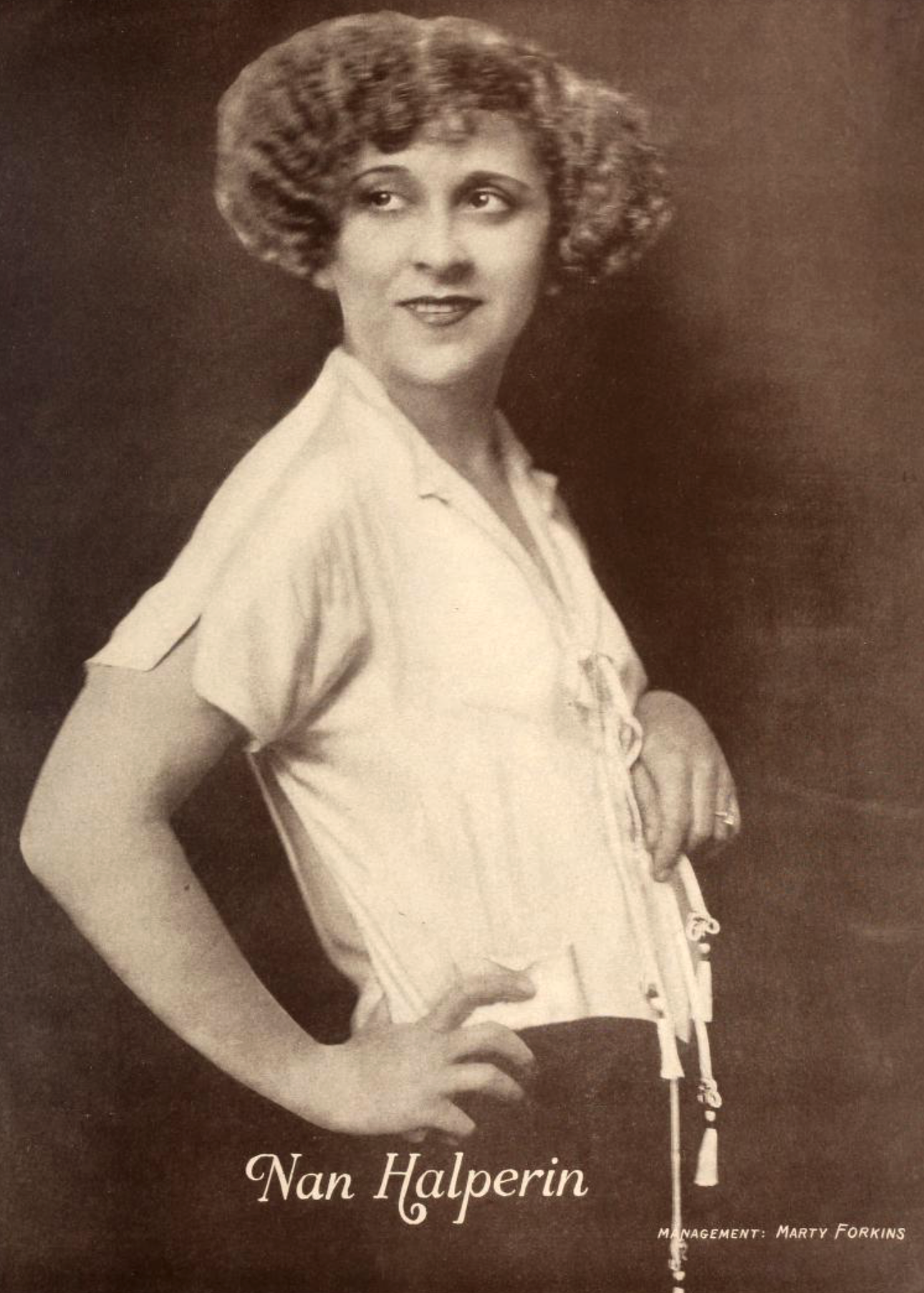
- Halperin in 1929
- Born: 1898; Odessa, Russia
- Died: May 30, 1963 (aged 64–65); Long Island, New York, US
- Occupation: Comedian
- Known for: Little Jessie James
- Spouse: William Barr Friedlander Ben Thomson Edgar D. Gould.

Nan Halperin (1898 – May 30, 1963) was a Russian immigrant to the USA who became a well-known singing comedian. She played in vaudeville at an early age, and later starred in musical comedies on Broadway such as Little Jessie James (1923).

== Early years ==
Nan Halperin was born in Odessa, Russia, in 1898, (Note: Biographers give Halperin's year of birth as 1898. This would make her around seventeen when she headlined at the Palace Theatre on Broadway in February 1915.) and moved with her family to the USA in 1900. They settled in Minneapolis. Her parents were Samuel Halperin, a confectioner, and Rebeka Rose Halperin. She had two brothers and two sisters. Her sister Sophie sometimes came with Nan on her tours. Although her family was Jewish, they sent her to a Catholic school for her education, the Holy Angels Academy. There she learned to sing and play the piano. As a child she appeared in local stage productions from the age of six, including starring in Alice in Wonderland.

== Vaudeville ==
Halperin appeared in vaudeville at the age of fifteen, impersonating a child. She performed in stock companies throughout the western United States and Mexico. Nan Halperin married the songwriter and vaudeville producer William Barr Friedlander, who composed all the songs she used in her act. At one time she was the soubrette in Freidlander's musical comedy company playing Forty-five Minutes from Broadway while Jean Weil (mother of the future film director Henry Hathaway) was the prime donna. They were based in San Francisco and touring the Pacific coast. Companies often went broke while on tour, and most of the players had a diamond ring they could pawn if needed so they could get back to San Francisco. They would redeem it when they got another job.

Halperin became a singing comedian who satirized the manners of the typical American woman. She was one of the first women to cut her hair into a bob. Only 5.2 feet (1.6 m) high, she wore high heels to look taller on stage. Halperin led a group of women who presented the skit Nan Halperin and Her Suffragettes. This was a very successful tab show produced by her husband. Nan Halperin's first Broadway appearance was with Emma Carus in A Broadway Honeymoon. In February 1915 she played as a headliner at the Palace Theatre on Broadway.

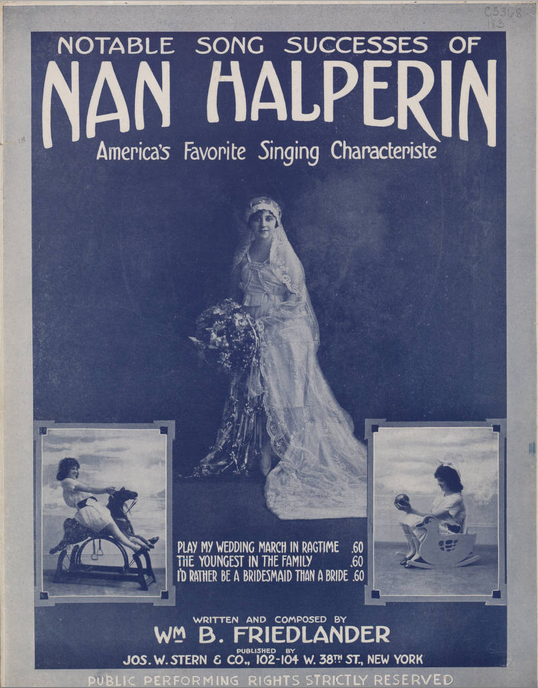
Sheet music cover. The songs by William B. Friedlander are from Halperin's five stages of girlhood cycle.

In 1916 Halperin received a three-year contract from the United Booking Office, the first vaudeville performer to gain such a contract, in which she would be directly managed by Edward Franklin Albee II. In 1916 Halperin began to perform a burlesque "song cycle" in which she depicted the five stages of girlhood, including a child, a bridesmaid and a "blasé divorcée." The New York Dramatic Mirror of 21 December 1918 called her performance "dramatic satire effectively done." In 1919 she began to perform a song cycle where she acted as a reluctant debutante whose parents make her wear "too many swell clothes … all to catch just one lone man." By 1919 she was one of the highest paid female performers in vaudeville.

== Broadway ==
Halperin starred in the musical comedy The Frivolities of 1919 and in the drama The Girl in the Stage Box. Between 13 April and 1 July 1922 Halperin headlined with Eddie Cantor, J. Harold Murray and Lew Hearn in the revue Make It Snappy, which ran for about 90 performances at the Winter Garden Theatre on Broadway. On 6 July 1922 she opened with Lew Hearn, Georgie Price and Valeska Suratt in the revue Spice of 1922, also at the Winter Garden.

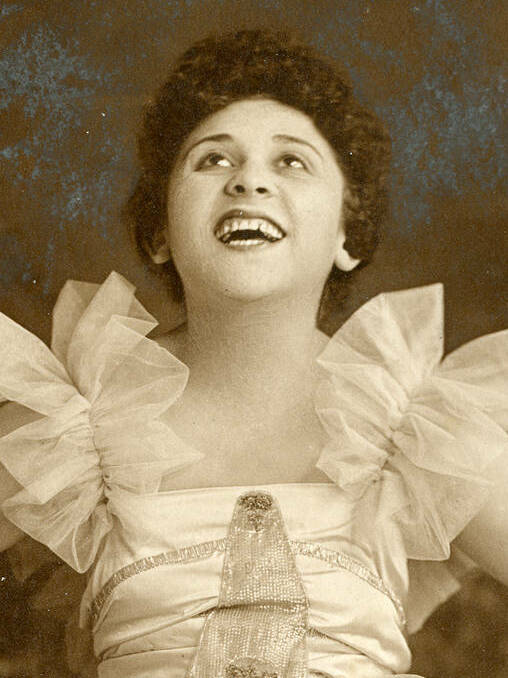
Nan Halperin in 1917

Halperin starred in the musical farce Little Jessie James, which opened on 15 August 1923 at the Longacre Theatre in New York. The show ran from mid-August through the whole of the 1923-24 season. Little Jessie James was the biggest hit of the season. Despite its name it was not a western but was set in an apartment looking over Central Park. Nan Halperin and Jay Velie starred, supported by Miriam Hopkins and Allen Kearns . The show was low-cost, with a single set and only eight chorus girls. In this show Halperin and Jay Velie introduced the song I Love You by Harlan Thompson and Harry Archer. I Love You was the biggest hit of all the songs from that season's musicals.

== Later career ==
Halperin returned to vaudeville in the later 1920s. She also regularly spoke and sang on radio, where she enacted famous historical women from Lucrezia Borgia to Martha Washington. In June 1932 Haplerin was headliner at the Orpheum Theatre in Los Angeles. By then, as she told the Los Angeles Examiner, vaudeville performers had to "compete with the greatest stars in the world, through talking motion pictures." She continued to play her routines in movie theaters between features in the 1930s. She ended her professional stage career in 1934.

Halperin divorced her first husband William Barr Friedlander, and married Ben Thomson on 21 December 1927. After Thomson died she married Edgar D. Gould on 4 January 1934. Nan Halperin died on 30 May 1963 on Long Island, New York.
