= William B. Friedlander =

American songwriter

William Barr Friedlander
- Born: 12 January 1884
- Died: 1. January 1968 (aged 83)
- Occupations: Songwriter and theater producer
- Known for: Separate Rooms (1940–41)

William Barr Friedlander (12 January 1884 – 1. January 1968, New York) was an American songwriter and theater producer who staged many Broadway shows in the 1920s and 1930s. Most of them were musical comedies. Early successes included Moonlight (1924) and Mercenary Mary (1925). Later productions received mixed reception. His longest-running production was the comedy Separate Rooms, which ran from March 1940 to September 1941.

== Early years ==
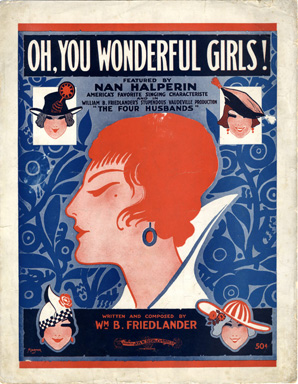
Sheet music for Oh You Wonderful Girls (1917)

William Barr Friedlander was born in 1884. He would become a librettist, composer, producer, director, author and manager. An early example of his work is the 1905 The Man with the Jingle, a song for which Friedlander wrote the lyrics to music by Charles E. Mullen. He wrote the lyrics to My lovin' Henry (1905), music by Terry Sherman.

Friedlander married the Russian-born Nan Halperin, a vaudeville performer, and composed all the songs she used in her act. During the 1910s and 1920s he produced a number of tabloid shows for vaudeville. The Suffragettes was a very successful tab show featuring Nan Halperin. In 1916 W.B. Friedlander Inc. produced Salamander Sallies by Will M. Hough (1882–1962) and Friedlander, The Night Clerk headed by Frank Ellis, The Four Husbands with Howard Burkholder and George W. Jenks, among others. The shows were booked through vaudeville houses. The company said it planned to produce a new revue called the Friedlander Show with seven complete stage settings and 34 people.

== First Broadway shows ==
Friedlander wrote the music and lyrics for Frivolities of 1920, a musical review that opened at the 44th Street Theatre on 8 January 1920, produced by G.M. Anderson. The show got poor reviews for its lack of wit and music, but stayed open for seven weeks. Friedlander's musical Pitter Patter was staged at the Longacre Theatre in 1920. The cast included James Cagney, the future film star. Pitter Patter opened at the Longacre on 28 September 1920 and ran for fourteen weeks.

In 1921 Freidlander and L. Lawrence Weber were in partnership to present dramatic, musical and vaudeville attractions at the Longacre on Broadway. In 1924 the Longacre staged the small musical Moonlight, with a score by Con Conrad and Friedlander. Moonlight opened at the Longacre on 30 January 1924. The critics called it tuneful fun. The show ran for 174 performances and then toured successfully. The next year Conrad and Friedlander's musical comedy Mercenary Mary was presented at the Longacre. It was based on the 1923 farce What's Your Wife Doing?. Although the music was weak the cast was strong, and included Allen Kearns. It opened at the Longacre on 13 April 1925 and ran for more than four months. Marion Wightman's The Dagger opened at the Longacre on 9 September 1925, directed by Friedlander. It was panned by the critics.

Friedlander produced and directed the play The Shelf, which opened at the Morisco on 27 September 1926 and ran for 32 performances. The cast, headed by Frances Starr, was excellent. The play was not. Friedlander produced the musical comedy Piggy, which opened at the Royale Theatre on 11 January 1927. The script was weak, but the popular comedian Sam Bernard played the starring role and carried the show for 79 performances. Bernard died soon after the show closed.

== Later productions ==
Friedlander produced and directed the musical comedy Jonica, which opened at the Craig Theatre on 7 April 1930. The authors were Dorothy Heyward and Moss Hart with music by Joseph Meyer and lyrics by William Moll. The show, called "odd, unlikely", was a flop. Moss Hart claimed he had little to do with the show. It is possible that Friedlander rewrote it without taking credit. The script appears to have been lost. Friedlander produced Under Glass, starring Ross Alexander. It opened at the Ambassador Theatre on Broadway on 30 October 1933 and ran for just eight performances. Hiram Sherman's farce Too Much Party, directed by William Friedlander, opened at the Theatre Masque on 5 March 1934 and closed after eight performances.

The comedy Separate Rooms opened at the Maxine Elliott Theatre on 23 March 1940, moved to the Mansfield Theatre on 15 April 1940, and then on 10 June 1940 moved to the Plymouth Theatre, where it finally closed on 6 September 1941 after 613 performances. The play was written by Alan Dinehart and Joseph Carole. Friedlander directed and staged it. Stars included Alan Dinehart, Glenda Farrell and Lyle Talbot.

Friedlander's revival of the 1907 musical comedy The Time, The Place and The Girl opened at the Mansfield Theater on 21 October 1942. Eugene Burr's review in Billboard was scathing, calling it "the monstrosity at the Mansfield". He said "Mr. Friedlander has directed all this in the manner of a below-average Burlesque skit. Principals are forlornly stranded in couples near the apron, and called upon to throw the frightful lines back and forth at each other in the manner of discomforted victims trying to pass the buck." Good Morning, Corporal opened at the Playhouse Theater on 8 August 1944, staged and presented by Friedlander. Writing in Billboard, Joseph Koehler said "This can't run—in fact it won't even crawl." The show closed after ten days. It was the last of Friedlander's productions to appear on Broadway.

W.B. Friedlander died in January 1968, aged 83 at Mount Sinai Hospital.

== Writer ==
Friedlander is credited as a writer for:

- Frivolities of 1920 (1920) Composer, Lyricist
- Pitter Patter (1920) Lyricist, Composer
- Moonlight (1924) Lyricist
- Mercenary Mary (1925) Composer, Bookwriter, Lyricist
- Remember Gay Vienna (1943) Lyricist
- The Time, the Place and the Girl (1942) Lyricist

== List of Broadway shows ==
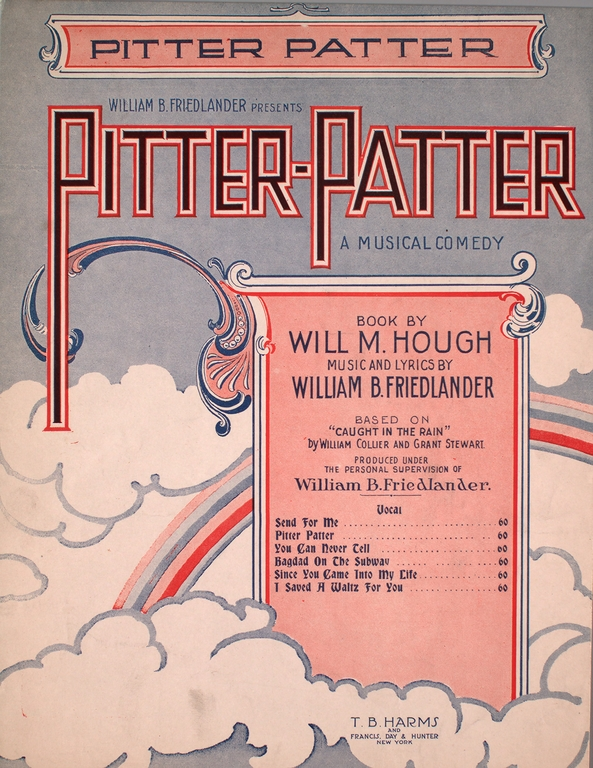
Cover for sheet music of the musical comedy Pitter-Patter by William B. Friedlander

Broadway shows included:

- Frivolities of 1920 (Musical, Revue, Original) Music, Lyrics, Staging (January 8, 1920 – February 28, 1920)
- Pitter Patter (Musical, Comedy, Original) Music, Producer, Lyrics (September 28, 1920 – January 1, 1921)
- Make It Snappy (Musical, Revue, Original) Additional lyrics and music (April 13, 1922 – July 1, 1922)
- Moonlight (Musical, Comedy, Original) Staging, Lyrics (January 30, 1924 – June 28, 1924)
- Mercenary Mary (Musical, Comedy, Original) Music, Staging, Book, Lyrics (April 13, 1925 – August 8, 1925)
- The Sea Woman (Play, Original) Staging (August 24, 1925 – September 1925)
- The Dagger (Play, Melodrama, Original) Staging (September 9, 1925 – September 1925)
- Hush Money (Play, Melodrama, Original) Staging (March 15, 1926 – May 1926)
- The Shelf (Play, Comedy, Drama, Original) Producer, Staging (September 27, 1926 – October 1926)
- Piggy (Musical, Comedy, Original) Producer, Director (January 11, 1927 – March 19, 1927)
- Footlights (Musical, Comedy, Original) Additional numbers (August 19, 1927 – September 24, 1927)
- Speak Easy (Play, Melodrama, Original) Producer (September 26, 1927 – November 1927)
- We Never Learn (Play, Original) Producer, Staging (January 23, 1928 – February 1928)
- Nice Women (Play, Comedy, Original) Director (June 10, 1929 – August 1929)
- Divided Honors (Play, Drama, Original) Staging (September 30, 1929 – November 1929)
- Jonica (Musical, Comedy, Original) Producer, Staging (April 7, 1930 – May 10, 1930)
- She Lived Next to the Firehouse (Play, Farce, Original) Staging (February 10, 1931 – March 1931)
- Nikki (Musical, Comedy, Original) Staging (September 29, 1931 – October 31, 1931)
- Before Morning (Play, Melodrama, Original) Staging (February 9, 1933 – March 1933)
- Under Glass (Play, Comedy, Original) Producer, Staging (October 30, 1933 – November 1933)
- The Locked Room (Play, Melodrama, Original) Producer, Staging (December 25, 1933 – January 1934)
- Too Much Party (Play, Comedy, Farce, Original) Staging (March 5, 1934 – March 1934)
- A Roman Servant (Play, Drama, Original) Staging (December 1, 1934 – December 1934)
- Cross-town (Play, Comedy, Original) Staging (March 17, 1937 – April 1937)
- Snookie (Play, Original) Jingles, Staging (June 3, 1941 – June 14, 1941)
- Separate Rooms (Play, Comedy, Original) Staging (March 23, 1940 – September 6, 1941)
- The Time, the Place and the Girl (Musical, Comedy, Revival) Director, Lyrics (October 21, 1942 – October 31, 1942)
- Right Next to Broadway (Play, Original) Staging (February 21, 1944 – March 4, 1944)
- Good Morning Corporal (Play, Original) Producer, Staging (August 8, 1944 – August 18, 1944)
