= Harlan Thompson =

American film director (1890–1966)

- Born: Harlan Thompson; 24 September 1890; Hannibal, Missouri
- Died: 29 October 1966 (aged 76); New York City, New York
- Occupations: Stage director; Screenwriter; Lyricist; Film director; Film producer; Television producer
- Known for: Little Jessie James; Ruggles of Red Gap; Married in Hollywood; Kiss and Make-Up
- Spouse: Marian Spitzer

Harlan Thompson (24 September 1890 – 29 October 1966) was an American theatre director, screenwriter, lyricist, film director, and film and television producer. He wrote the Broadway hit Little Jessie James (1923–24), and several other Broadway musicals. He moved to Hollywood, where he was in turn a writer, director and producer.

== Career ==
Harlan Thompson was born in Hannibal, Missouri, on 24 September 1890. He went to high school in Kansas City, Missouri, and then attended the University of Kansas. He studied chemical engineering. Thompson became a reporter and editor for The Kansas City Star and Kansas City Post. During World War I (1914–18) he was in the 167th Aero Squadron of the American Expeditionary Forces. After the war he worked for the New York World.

=== Broadway ===
In 1923 Harlan Thompson wrote the book and lyrics for the musical comedy Little Jessie James, with music by Harry Archer. It was staged by Walter Brooks and produced by L. Lawrence Weber. The musical played at the Longacre Theatre on Broadway from 15 August 1923 to 27 January 1924, then moved to the Little Theatre where it played until 19 July 1924. The show played for a total of 385 performances on Broadway. Nan Halperin played Jessie Jamieson, in pursuit of Jay Velie as Paul Revere. Supporting roles were played by Miriam Hopkins and Allen Kearns. The show was low-cost, with a single set and only eight chorus girls. Halperin and Jay Velie introduced the song I Love You by Thompson and Archer. Little Jessie James was the biggest hit of the season and I Love You was the biggest hit of all the songs from that season's musicals.

After their success with Little Jessie James, Thompson and Archer created the musical farce My Girl that opened at the Vanderbilt Theatre on 24 November 1924 and starring Jane Taylor and Russell Mack. The show included catchy numbers like You And I, and ran for six months. Thompson and Archer collaborated again on Merry, Merry, which opened on 24 September 1925 at the Vanderbilt. The musical starred Marie Saxon and Harry Puck. Although not exceptional, it ran for five months. In 1926 Thompson and Harry Archer launched the musical comedy Twinkle Twinkle, which opened at the Liberty Theatre on 16 November 1926. Thompson wrote the libretto while Archer wrote the score, with help from Bert Kalmar and Harry Ruby. The stars were Ona Munson and Alan Edwards, while Joe E. Brown played a comic detective. Twinkle Twinkle ran for twenty one weeks.

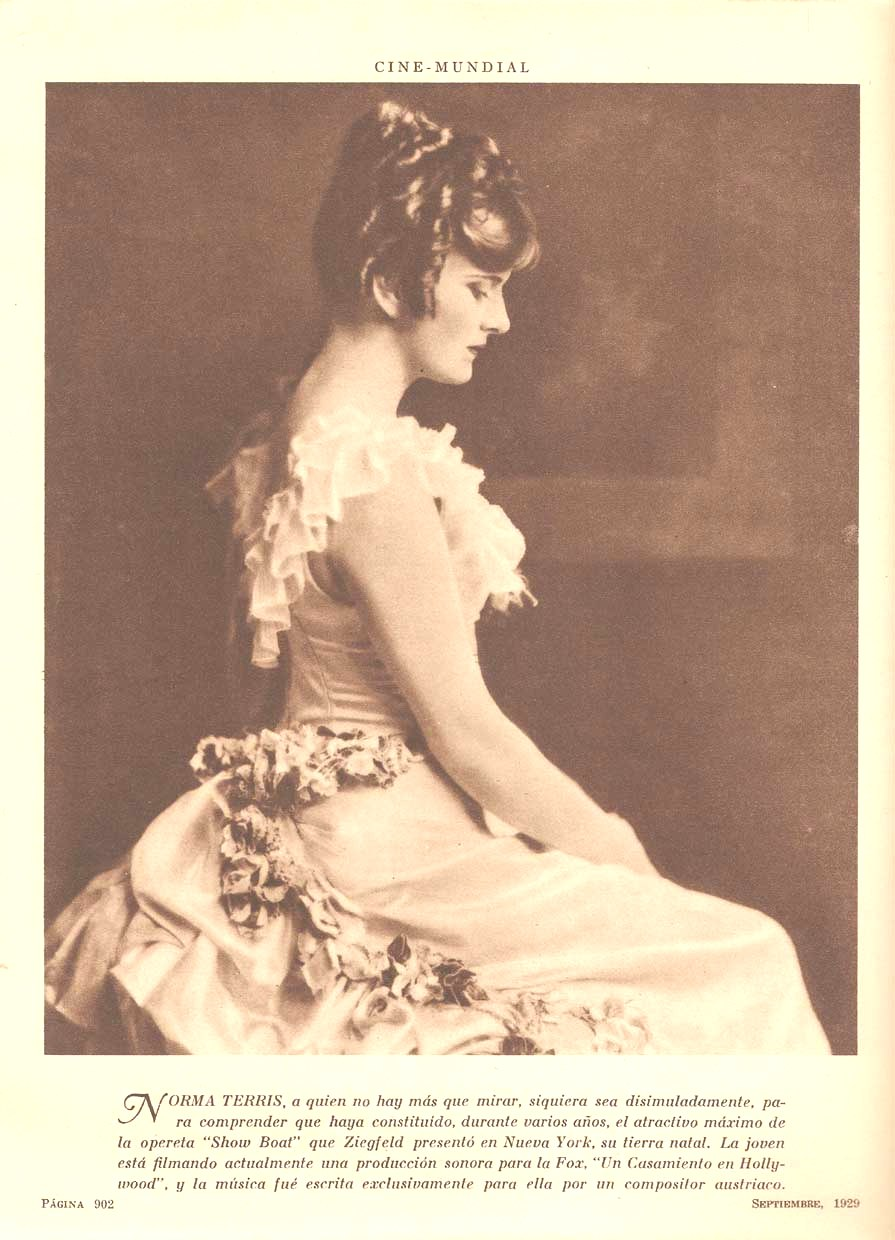
Norma Terris in 1929 in an advertisement for Un Casamiento en Hollywood, the Spanish version of Married in Hollywood

=== Hollywood writer ===
Thompson began to work for Fox as a writer. He combined and adapted the operettas Married in Hollywood (1928) and Ein Waltzertraum (1907) to create the dialog for the film Married in Hollywood (Fox, 21 September 1929) directed by Marcel Silver. The stars were J. Harold Murray and Norma Terris. The New York Times said the film was "adroitly interspersed with joviality and extremely clever photographic embellishments". However, it was a box office failure. Only twelve minutes from the last reel have survived.

In 1929 the German director F. W. Murnau began filming Our Daily Bread for Fox, one of studio's the last silent movies. He aimed for great realism in depicting the transition from the fields where wheat was harvested to the dark rooms in Chicago where the bread was consumed. Filming started late, and on 2 August Murnau came down with appendicitis. With a deadline set by the harvest season, filming on location in Oregon began without him. The rushes looked unpromising. Thompson was sent to Oregon early in September to try to add some comedy to the scenario. Eventually a mutilated version of the film was released as City Girl (Fox, 16 February 1930).

Thompson wrote the scenario and dialog for the romantic drama Women Everywhere (Fox, 1 June 1930) starring J. Harold Murray and directed by Alexander Korda. According to Variety it was "one of those gems occasionally found in the herd of program pictures". The film was quickly forgotten. Thompson wrote the dialog for the musical Are You There? (Fox, 30 November 1930) directed by Hamilton MacFadden and starring Beatrice Lillie. The film was unusual as a musical about a female detective. Release was delayed from the end of 1930 to early summer of 1931. The film received mixed reviews. Variety panned it, but Exhibitors Herald-World described Lillie as "smart-looking, clever and mirth-provoking... Her personality and grace are registered superbly upon the screen." Thompson wrote the screenplay for Girls Demand Excitement (Fox, 1931) directed by Seymour Felix and starring Virginia Cherrill, John Wayne and Marguerite Churchill.

After moving to Paramount, Thompson collaborated with Walter de Leon on the screenplay for the musical The Phantom President (Paramount, 25 September 1932) directed by Norman Taurog. In 1933, David O. Selznick, a producer at Metro-Goldwyn-Mayer, was negotiating with Walt Disney for co-production of a cartoon version of Baron Munchausen starring Mickey Mouse. Thompson and Victor Heerman prepared a script for the film, to be called Vas You Dere, Sharlie, but the project was abandoned.

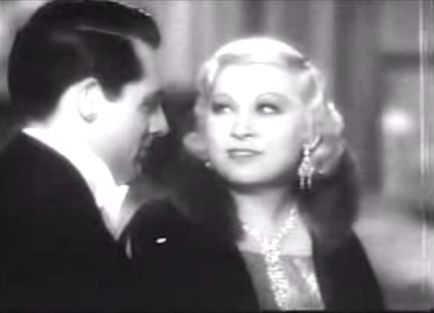
Cary Grant and Mae West in I'm No Angel (1933)

Thompson was assigned as "continuity writer" to the Mae West vehicle that became I'm No Angel (Paramount, 6 October 1933). She had fired two writers who had been assigned by Paramount, but accepted help from Thompson, who wrote a lot of the script and some of Mae West's dialog. According to Thompson's wife, "How much she contributed I don't know, but she moved in, as she always moved in on anything, and got credit for the story, the screenplay and the dialogue." Thompson was the main scriptwriter for Here is My Heart (Paramount, 28 December 1934), adapted from Alfred Savoir's play The Grand Duchess and the Waiter and starring Bing Crosby and Kitty Carlisle. The film was highly praised by the critics, who noted Crosby's performance as a talented comedian, not just a crooner.

=== Hollywood director and producer ===
Harlan Thompson and George Marion, Jr. wrote the scenario for Kiss and Make-Up (Paramount, 13 July 1934). Thompson directed the film, which starred Cary Grant, Helen Mack and Genevieve Tobin. In 1938 Thompson produced The Big Broadcast of 1938, a comedy with Bob Hope and W.C. Fields. Thompson was associate producer of Kisses for Breakfast (Warner Bros. 5 July 1941), a romantic comedy. He was associate producer of Bad Men of Missouri (Warner Bros, 26 July 1941), a western. Jack L. Warner was executive producer and Ray Enright was director.

During World War II (1939–1945) Thompson was made a major in 1942 after the United States entered the combat and given the direction of the Training Film Division of the US Army Signal Corps. The unit turned out instructional films for the huge numbers of newly recruited officers and enlisted men in the expanded army. They covered subjects like Conservation of Clothing and Equipment, The Internal Combustion Engine and Trench Feet.

Harlan Thompson died at New York University Hospital in New York on 29 October 1966. He was aged 76.

== Work ==
=== Broadway ===
From 1923 through 1932 Thompson was active on Broadway in the following productions:

- Little Jessie James (1923)
- My Girl (1924)

music by Harry Archer, directed by Walter Brooks, (291 performances November 1924 – August 1925)

- Merry, Merry (1925)
- Twinkle, Twinkle (1926)

music by Harry Archer, directed by Frank Craven, (167 performances, November 1925 – April 1927)
Cast: Elise Bonwit, Joe E. Brown, Frank Bryan, Perqueta Courtney, Diana Day, Alan Edwards, Anita Firman, John Gray, Patty Hastings, Phyllis Hooper, Wanda Jarzy, Buddy Jenkins, Dorothy Jordan, Douglas Keaton, Ann Kelly, Therese Kelly, Myrtle Le Roy, Joseph Lertora, Flo Lewis, Allyn Loring, Alice MacDonald, Dorothy Martin, William J. McCarthy, Ned McGarn, Helen Mirtel, Ona Munson, Henry Nelthropp, Frances Nevins, Marion Nevins, Ana Nito, John O'Neil, John Sheehan, Betty Sheldon, Nerene Swinton, Frances Upton, Hazel Vee, Betty Veronica, Diana White, and Wanda Wood. Produced by Louis F. Werba

- Blessed Event (1932)

written by Manuel Seff and Forrest Wilson, directed by Harlan Thompson, (115 performances February 1932 – May 1932)
Cast: Jean Adair, Robert Allen, Matt Briiggs, Charles D. Brown, Ollie Burgoyne, Kenneth Dana, Herbert Duffy, George Greenberg, Allen Jenkins, Isabel Jewell, Herman Jones, Walter Kinsella, David Leonard, Ralph Locke, Eddie Lynch, Herman J. Mankiewicz, John Morrissey, Lee Patrick, Dorothea Petgen, Roger Pryor, John Robb, Lynn Root, Frank Rowan, Henry Shelvey, Thelma Tipson, Mildred Wall, Milton Wallace, Produced by Sidney Phillips and Harlan Thompson.

=== Film writer ===
Thompson was credited as writer on the following films:

- Hot News (1928)
- Take Me Home (1928)
- The Ghost Talks (1929)
- Married in Hollywood (1929)
- The Big Party (1930)
- Women Everywhere (1930)
- Are You There? (1930)
- Girls Demand Excitement (1931)
- Annabelle's Affairs (1931)
- The Phantom President (1932)
- He Learned About Women (1933)
- Kiss and Make-Up (1934)
- Here Is My Heart (1934)
- Ruggles of Red Gap (1935)
- It's a Great Life (1935)
- Ship Cafe (1935)
- Rose of the Rancho (1936)
- How to Be Very, Very Popular (1955)

=== Lyricist ===
Thompson was credited as lyricist on the following films:

- Words and Music (1929) "The Hunting Song", "Take a Little Tip", "Too Wonderful for Words"
- Married in Hollywood (1929) "Dance Away the Night", "Peasant Love Song", "A Man, A Maid", "Deep In Love", "Bridal Chorus", "National Anthem"
- Melody in Spring (1934) "Ending With A Kiss", "Melody in Spring", "It's Psychological", "The Open Road"
- Ship Cafe (1935) "Fatal Fascination", "I Won't Take No for an Answer", "It's a Great Life"
- Stalag 17 (1953) "I Love You" (Je t'aime)

=== Film director ===
Thompson directed the following films:

- The Past of Mary Holmes (1933)
- Kiss and Make-Up (1934)

=== Film producer ===
Thompson was credited as producer on the following films:

- Early to Bed (1936)
- Wives Never Know (1936)
- College Holiday (1936)
- Champagne Waltz (1937)
- The Big Broadcast of 1938 (1938)
- Romance in the Dark (1938)
- Paris Honeymoon (1939)
- The Magnificent Fraud (1939)
- Disputed Passage (1939)
- Road to Singapore (1940)
- East of the River (1940)
- The Wagons Roll at Night (1941)
- Singapore Woman (1941)
- Kisses for Breakfast (1941)
- Bad Men of Missouri (1941)

=== TV producer ===
Thompson is credited with two TV shows:

- The Ed Wynn Show (5 episodes, 1949–1950) (TV)
- The Cases of Eddie Drake (1 episode, 1952) (TV)
