= Jay Velie =

American actor and singer (1892–1982)

- Born: 16 May 1892; Denver, Colorado, US
- Died: 22 April 1982 (aged 89); Larchmont, New York, US
- Occupation: Actor
- Known for: Little Jessie James (1923-24)

Jay Velie (16 May 1892 – 22 April 1982) was an American actor and singer; he appeared in many Broadway shows during a career that spanned more than fifty years. He also appeared in a few film shorts.

== Career ==
Velie was born in Denver, Colorado, on 16 May 1892. He became an actor and singer, first appearing on stage in 1912. His career on Broadway lasted for over fifty 50 years, on occasion appearing with his sister, Janet Velie.

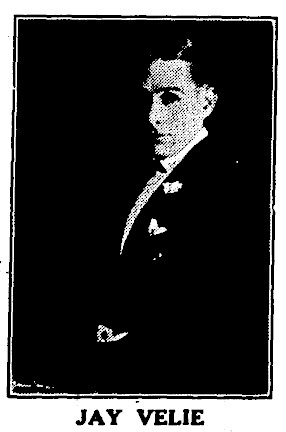
Jay Velie, 1921 in the New York Clipper

Velie's first Broadway lead was in Little Jesse James (1923–24). Little Jessie James was written by Harlan Thompson, the author of the book and the lyrics. The music was by Harry Archer. It was produced by L. Lawrence Weber. Nan Halperin played Jessie Jamieson, in pursuit of Jay Velie as Paul Revere. Little Jessie James was the biggest hit of the season, and I Love You, performed by Halpern and Velie, was the biggest hit of all the songs from that season's musicals. After this, Velie continued to play in Broadway shows, included several major hits, until his final role in 70, Girls, 70 in 1971.

Velie formed a song-and-dance vaudeville team with Renée Robert. On 4 January 1925 they opened the one-act musical Terpsichore and Troubadour by Rodgers and Hart at the Palace Theatre. Later they took this act on the road. Velie was among the cast of the Rodgers and Hammerstein musical Carousel, which opened at the Majestic Theatre on 19 April 1945 and ran for 890 performances. This may have been the greatest of the Rodgers and Hammerstein scores. Velie was cast as Senator Brockbank in the Irving Berlin musical Call Me Madam, produced by Leland Hayward and directed by George Abbott. It opened at the Imperial Theatre on 12 October 1950 and ran for 644 performances. Velie played "Mr. M." in the musical Happy Hunting directed by Abe Burrows, which opened on 6 December 1956 at the Majestic Theatre and ran for 412 performances. The show won several Tony nominations for members of the cast.

The Rodgers and Hammerstein musical The Sound of Music reopened at the Lunt-Fontanne Theatre on 16 November 1959 and played for 1,443 performances. Velie played Admiral von Schreiber as a replacement. Velie appeared in Jennie, a musical by Arnold Schulman that opened at the Majestic on 17 October 1963 and ran for 82 performances. He again played Admiral von Schreiber in a revival of The Sound of Music that played for 23 performances from 26 April 1967 to 14 May 1967 at the New York City Center. This version received lukewarm reviews.

Jay Velie died of congestive failure on 22 April 1982 at his home in Larchmont, New York, aged 89.

== Broadway shows ==
Jay Velie's Broadway shows included:

- Round the Town (Musical, Revue, Original) May 21, 1924 - May 31, 1924
- Little Jessie James (Musical, Farce, Comedy, Original - as Paul Revere) August 15, 1923 - July 19, 1924
- The Grab Bag (Musical, Revue, Original) October 6, 1924 - March 14, 1925
- A la Carte (Musical, Revue, Original) August 17, 1927 - Sep 1927
- Diff'rent (Play, Revival - as Alfred Rogers) January 25, 1938 - February 12, 1938
- Pygmalion (Play, Comedy, Revival - as Colonel Pickering) January 25, 1938 - February 12, 1938
- Captain Jinks of the Horse Marines (Play, Comedy, Revival - as The Herald Reporter) January 25, 1938 - February 12, 1938
- No More Peace (Play, Revival - as St. Francis) January 25, 1938 - February 12, 1938
- Coriolanus (Play, Tragedy, Revival - as Tullush Aufidius) January 25, 1938 - February 12, 1938
- The Fabulous Invalid (Play, Original - as An Announcer) October 8, 1938 - December 3, 1938
- Counsellor-at-Law (Play, Revival - as A Tall Man) November 24, 1942 - July 10, 1943
- Our Town (Play, Drama, Revival - as Sam Craig) January 10, 1944 - January 29, 1944
- Carousel (Musical, Drama, Original - as 1st Heavenly Friend) April 19, 1945 - May 24, 1947
- Carousel (Musical, Drama, Revival - as Heavenly Friend) February 22, 1949 - March 5, 1949
- Call Me Madam (Musical, Comedy, Original - as Senator Brockbank) October 12, 1950 - May 3, 1952
- Carousel (Musical, Drama, Revival - as Heavenly Friend) Jun 02, 1954 - August 8, 1954
- Happy Hunting (Musical, Comedy, Original - as Mr. M.) December 6, 1956 - November 30, 1957
- The Sound of Music (Musical, Drama, Original - as Admiral von Schreiber - Replacement) November 16, 1959 - Jun 15, 1963
- Jennie (Musical, Original - as Sheriff Pugsley, Gentleman, Fire Chief) October 17, 1963 - December 28, 1963
- 70, Girls, 70 (Musical, Original - as Ensemble Player) April 15, 1971 - May 15, 1971

== Film ==
Jay Velie acted or played himself in the film shorts:

- A Group of Songs (1928)
- Jay Velie (1928)
- A Journey of Songs (1929)
- One Good Turn (1930)
- A Little Girl with Big Ideas (1934).
