= Little Jessie James =

1923 musical farce

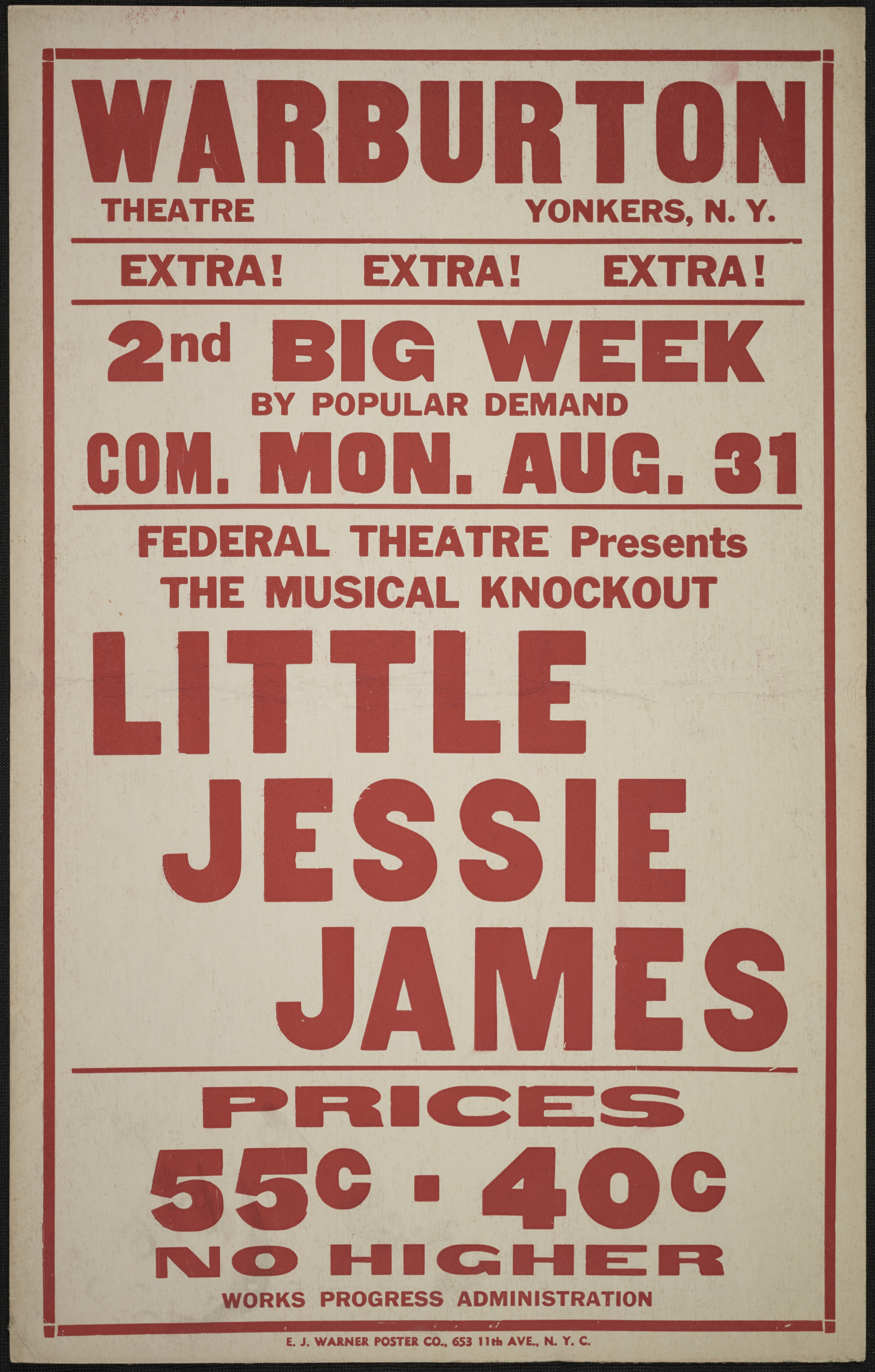
- Poster by the Works Progress Administration as part of the Federal Theatre Project
- Original language: English
- Written by: Harlan Thompson (lyrics, book); Harry Archer (music)
- Genre: Musical farce
- Setting: Living Room of Paul's Apartment, Central Park West, New York City.

Premiere
- Date: 12 August 1923
- Place: Longacre Theatre, Broadway, Manhattan, New York, USA

Little Jessie James was a musical farce that was the biggest hit of the 1923-24 Broadway season.

== Production ==
Little Jessie James was written by Harlan Thompson, the author of the book and the lyrics. The music was by Harry Archer. It was staged by Walter Brooks and produced by L. Lawrence Weber. Scenery was designed by P. Dodd Ackerman and costumes by Mabel E. Johnston.

Nan Halperin played Jessie Jamieson, in pursuit of Jay Velie as Paul Revere. Supporting roles were played by Miriam Hopkins and Allen Kearns. This was Halperin's best known role outside of vaudeville. The show was low-cost, with a single set and only eight chorus girls. The James Boys, who were billed as the "Paul Whiteman Orchestra", played a specialty during the entr'acte. The musical director Ernest Cutting had eleven men in the pit at the Longacre. including strings, brass, piano and percussion. Halperin and Jay Velie introduced the song I Love You by Thompson and Archer.

The musical played at the Longacre Theatre on Broadway from August 15, 1923 to January 27, 1924, then moved to the Little Theatre where it played until July 19, 1924. The show played for a total of 385 performances. After New York, L. Lawrence Weber took the show on the road with four touring companies in the USA. It played for one night in Schenectady, New York, on March 18, 1925. The show played in Australia for eight months, and under the name Lucky Break played in London for 198 performances in 1934–35.

== Plot synopsis ==
Little Jessie James is a musical farce in two acts. Despite its name, it was not a western but was set in an apartment looking over Central Park. Jessie Jamieson (Halperin) is out to get Paul Revere (Velie) and will not let the usual bedroom farce complications distract her from winning her man.

== Reception ==
The New York critics did not pan the show, but did not give it much attention. It only received passing mention from Burns Mantle in his review of the year's shows. However, Little Jessie James was the biggest hit of the season. I Love You contributed to the show's success. The song was the biggest hit of all the songs from that season's musicals.

== Cast ==
The full cast was:

Stars

- Nan Halperin (Jessie Jamieson)
- Jay Velie (Paul Revere)
- Miriam Hopkins (Juliet)
- Allen Kearns (Tommy Tinker)

Others

- Carl Anderson (Clarence)
- Herbert Bostwick (Harold)
- James B. Carson (S. Block)
- Roger Gray (William J. Pierce)
- Winifred Harris (Mrs. Flower)
- Ann Sands (Geraldine Flower)
- Clara Thropp (Mrs. Jamieson)

As themselves

- Bobbie Breslau (Bobbie)
- Loretta Flushing (Loretta)
- Edna Howard (Edna)
- Iris Loraine (Iris)
- Claire Luce (Claire)
- Dorothy Martin (Dorothy)
- Lucila Mendez (Lucila)
- Agnes Morrisey (Agnes)
- Blanche O'Brien (Blanche)
- Bonnie Shaw (Bonnie)
- Emily Stead (Emily)
- Frances Upton (Frances)
