= Rudolph K. Hynicka =

American politician

Rudolph Kelker Hynicka
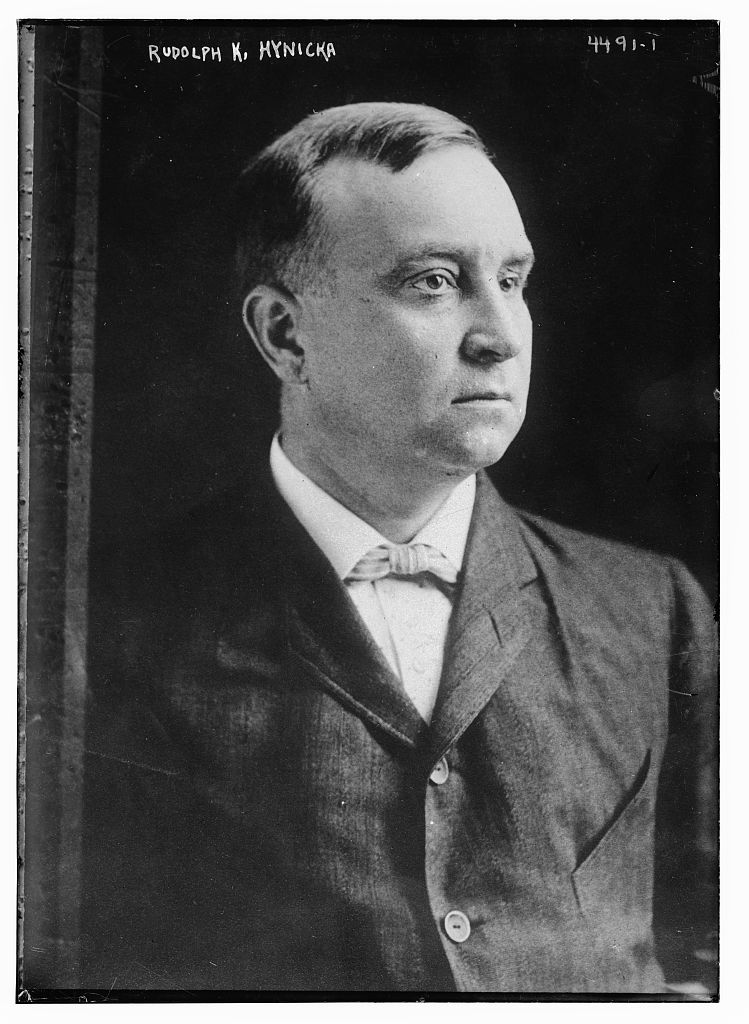
- Hynicka in 1918
- Born: 6 July 1859; Myerstown, Pennsylvania, US
- Died: 21 February 1927 (aged 67); St. Petersburg, Florida, US
- Occupation: Politician

Rudolph Kelker Hynicka (or Rud Hynicka; 6 July 1859 – 21 February 1927) was an American politician who led the Republican party in Cincinnati, Ohio, for many years during a period when politics in Cincinnati was scandal-ridden. Hynicka was also involved in operating a chain of burlesque houses, and was a partner in an attempt to form a theatrical "wheel" in 1910.

== Early years ==
Rudolph Kelker Hynicka was born on 6 July 1859 in Myerstown, Pennsylvania. Hynicka was from a Pennsylvania Dutch family. In the 1880s he moved to Cincinnati, the county seat of Hamilton County, Ohio, and became a reporter for The Cincinnati Enquirer. He joined the Republican party, initially as a supporter of George Moerlein. He was appointed by the Moerlein faction to positions in the offices of the county auditor and county treasurer. In the 1890s Hynicka was elected police clerk. He became the Republican captain of Cincinnati's 9th ward.

== Political career ==
Hynicka moved to the camp of George B. Cox, and took responsibility for maintaining Cox's voter card file. This contained records on every voter in Cincinnati, including where they worked, which church they belonged to and any scandals in which they had been involved. Hynicka became the most powerful of Cox's supporters. He headed Cincinnati's influential Republican Central Committee of ward and township captains and managed allocation of the 2,000 political patronage jobs in the city. By the start of the 1890s Hynicka, Cox and Garry Herrmann dominated Cincinnati politics. In 1897 they lost a mayoral election campaign in which the Democrat Gustav Tafel promised to clean up the city. Various scandals emerged after the Democrats took office. One involved Hynicka using his office as clerk of the police court to earn bribes of $150–$200 a week.

The Republican candidate Julius Fleischmann was elected in 1900 and reelected in 1903. Hynicka was elected treasurer of Hamilton County in 1903, his only elective office. In October 1905 the Cox machine was attacked by William Howard Taft in a speech linked to President Theodore Roosevelt's drive to eliminate corruption in business and politics. In 1911 Cox announced "I am retiring. I hope my enemies will find other targets". When Cox retired Hynicka became leader of the Republican party in Hamilton county. Hynicka and Herrmann agreed to reorganize the Republican Advisory Committee without Cox at the request of Charles Phelps Taft, the president's brother.

On 2 April 1912 Hynicka announced that he had withdrawn from politics to devote himself to his business interests. Cox and Herrmann had already made similar announcements. Later Hynicka was chosen to represent Ohio in the Republican National Committee, holding this position until 1924, when he was succeeded by Maurice Mashke of Cleveland. In the 1920 elections the Republicans won the White House by a landslide. In Cincinnati, however, Hynicka's candidates were less successful, indicating that his power was waning. A letter from Warren G. Harding of 4 October 1921 said "... I should not grieve if Hynicka should be overturned in Hamilton County, but I do not subscribe to the theory that the way to overturning is to put the Republican party out of power in the municipality of Cincinnati." In 1926 Hynicka retired from his position as chairman of the Hamilton county executive and central committee of the Republican organization.

== Other interests ==
In 1905 the old Vine Street Opera House in Cincinnati was renovated and reopened as the Standard Theater. It was managed as a burlesque house by Hynicka and Charles B. Arnold until 1915. In November 1906 Variety noted that a corporation controlled by John J. Ryan and Rudolph K. Hynicka, of Cincinnati, was operating a theater in St. Louis. Rudolph K. Hynicka came to own a chain of burlesque houses. In 1910 Hynicka became involved in the Columbia Burlesque Circuit, playing a leading role in that organization.

On 4 December 1910 L. Lawrence Weber announced a plan to form a circuit of popular theaters, the Lawrence Weber Co-operative Booking Circuit. The investors were Weber, Sam A. Scribner, John Herbert Mack and Rudolph K. Hynicka. They planned to acquire forty theaters in cities around the United States and Canada, and to supply them with forty theater companies playing in rotation. They would put on equal numbers of melodramas, society plays, comedy dramas, farce comedies and musical comedies, charging popular prices. The partners were all associated with the "Eastern Wheel" of burlesque theaters, which had a similar business model. By 1914 Hynicka had acquired a large stake in Cox's interests in theaters in New York, and was spending growing amount of time in that city. Hynicka invested in the Cincinnati Commercial-Tribune, a newspaper, and became president of the company. The paper supported the Republican party, and expected assistance in return.

Hynicka's first wife died in 1912, and he remarried. He died on 21 February 1927 in St. Petersburg, Florida. His funeral was attended by many people involved in theater.
