= Janet Velie =

American actress (1895–1992)

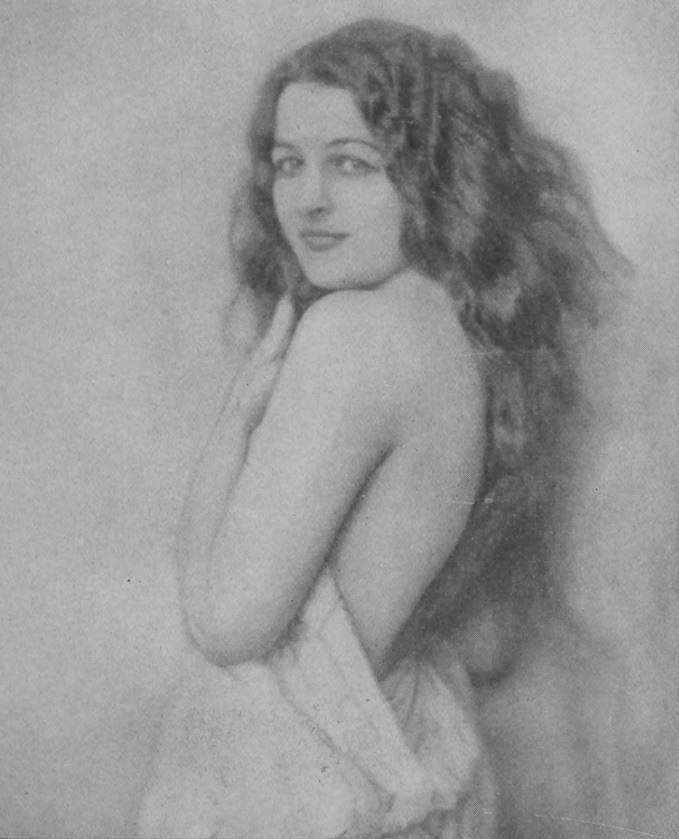
From a 1922 magazine

Janet Velie (23 April 1895 – December 17, 1992) was an American actress who was primarily known for her performances in Broadway musicals. She first came to prominence portraying the title roles in the musicals La La Lucille (1919) and Mary (1920), and then had success in the Ed Wynn music revues The Perfect Fool (1921) and The Grab Bag (1924). In 1925 she created the role of confidence woman Penelope Martin in Irving Berlin's The Cocoanuts; a role she reprised in 1927. She was the sister of actor Jay Velie and sometimes performed in productions with him. In addition to her work in theatre, she also appeared in a few short films.

== Life and career ==
Born in Denver, Colorado, Janet Velie was the sister of actor Jay Velie. She began her career as a chorus girl with a stock company in her native city. She made her Broadway debut in the minor part of Miss Cassie Roll in the Jerome Kern, Guy Bolton, and P. G. Wodehouse musical Oh, Lady! Lady!!. She left that production midway through its run to take on her first leading role as Miss Harte in The Kiss Burglar (1918). She then replaced Edith Day in the lead role of Grace Douglas in the Broadway production of Going Up towards the end of its run at the Liberty Theatre; a role she continued in when the production went on national tour.

In 1919 Velie had her first major success originating the title role in the Broadway musical La La Lucille at Henry Miller's Theatre. This was followed by the title part in the 1920 musical Mary at the Knickerbocker Theatre. She next starred opposite Ed Wynn in his musical revue The Perfect Fool at George M. Cohan's Theatre in 1921–1922. In 1924 she starred in two short lived musicals on Broadway, Round the Town and Bye, Bye, Barbara, before starring in another successful Ed Wynn revue, The Grab Bag in 1924–1925.

In 1925 Velie originated the role of confidence woman Penelope Martin in Irving Berlin's The Cocoanuts; a role she returned to on Broadway in 1927. She next appeared as Mrs. Patricia Conway in the Joe Cook musical Rain or Shine; a hit on Broadway in 1928. That same year she created the role of Daphne De Lorne in the musical Three Cheers; another successful show which had a long run into 1929. Her final performances on Broadway was as Martha Trumbell in the musical Heads Up which opened in November 1929 and closed in March 1930.

Velie appeared in a few short films, including the 1930 Vitaphone Varieties film The Bubble Party. She also portrayed Emily Braley in the 1933 short film Yours Sincerely.

Velie died on December 17, 1992, in White Plains, New York.

== Bibliography ==
- Ruth Benjamin, Arthur Rosenblatt (2006). Who Sang what on Broadway, 1866-1996: The singers (L-Z). McFarland & Company. ISBN 978-0-7864-1506-9.
- Bordman, Gerald (2001). American Musical Theater: A Chronicle. Oxford University Press. ISBN 9780195130744.
- Jack Burton, Graydon LaVerne Freeman (1962). The Blue Book of Tin Pan Alley: A Human Interest Encyclopedia of American Popular Music, Volume 1. Century House.
- Dan Dietz (2019). The Complete Book of 1920s Broadway Musicals. Rowman & Littlefield Publishers. ISBN 9781538112823.
- Thomas S. Hischak (2008). The Oxford Companion to the American Musical: Theatre, Film, and Television. Oxford University Press. ISBN 9780199887323.
- David A. Jasen (1979). The theatre of P. G. Wodehouse. Batsford Books. ISBN 9780713415841.
- Gregory R. Suriano (1998). Gershwin in His Time: A Biographical Scrapbook, 1919-1937. Gramercy Books. ISBN 9780517201985.
- Graham Webb (2020-07-10). Encyclopedia of American Short Films, 1926-1959. McFarland. ISBN 978-1-4766-3926-0.
