= Longacre Theatre =

Broadway theater in Manhattan, New York

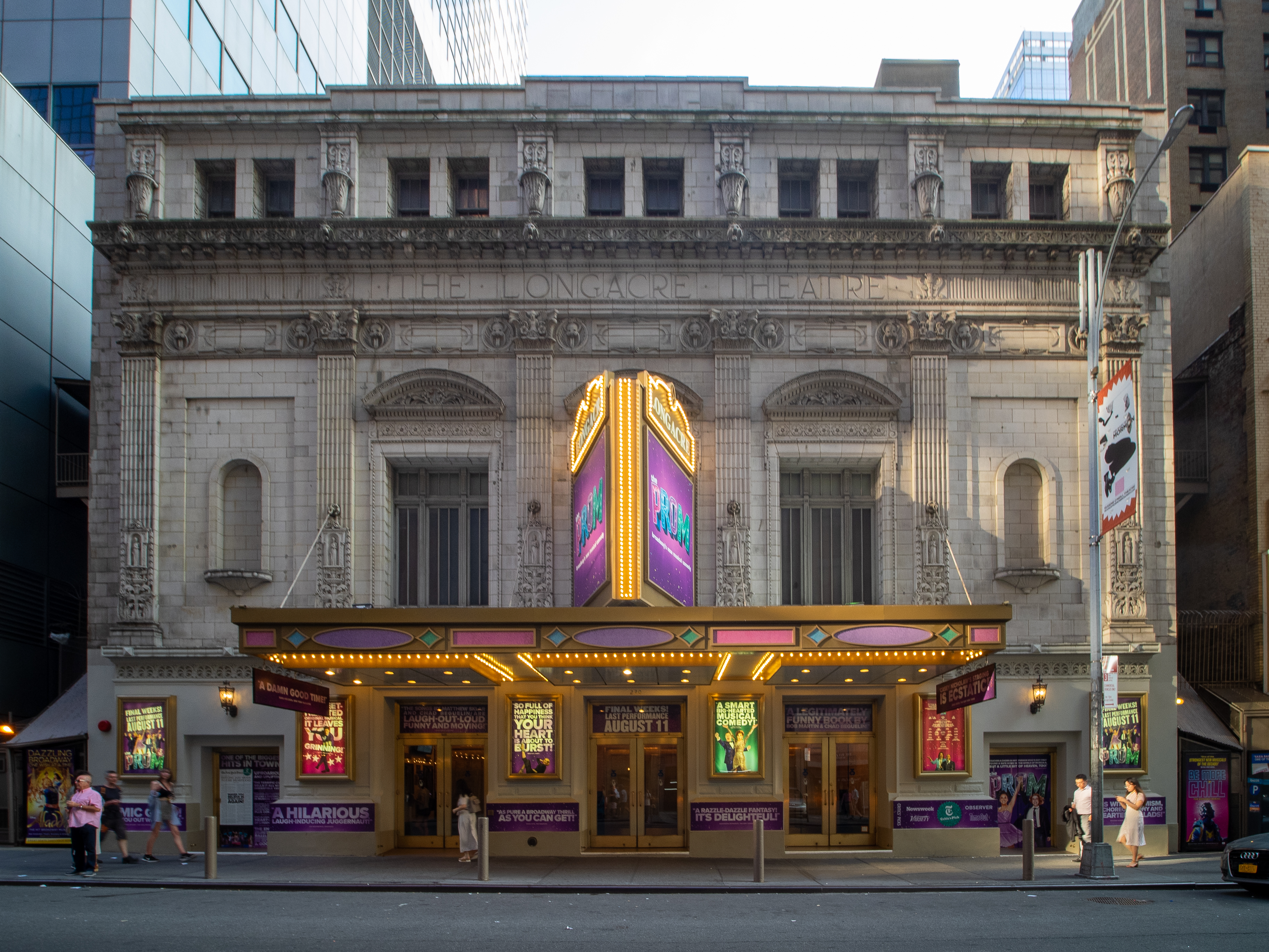
- The Prom, 2019
- Interactive map of Longacre Theatre
- Address: 220 West 48th Street; Manhattan, New York; United States
- Coordinates: 40°45′37″N 73°59′09″W
- Owner: The Shubert Organization
- Capacity: 1,077
- Type: Broadway
- Production: Two Strangers (Carry a Cake Across New York)

Construction
- Opened: May 1, 1913 (113 years ago)
- Years active: 1913–1942, 1953–present
- Architect: Henry Beaumont Herts

Website
- shubert.nyc/theatres/longacre/

New York City Landmark
- Designated: December 8, 1987
- Reference no.: 1348
- Designated entity: Facade

New York City Landmark
- Designated: December 8, 1987
- Reference no.: 1349
- Designated entity: Auditorium interior

The Longacre Theatre is a Broadway theater at 220 West 48th Street in the Theater District of Midtown Manhattan in New York City, New York, U.S. Opened in 1913, it was designed by Henry B. Herts and is named for Longacre Square, the former name of Times Square. The Longacre has 1,077 seats across three levels and is operated by The Shubert Organization. Both the facade and the auditorium's interior are New York City designated landmarks.

The ground-floor facade is made of rusticated blocks of terracotta. The theater's main entrance is shielded by a marquee. The upper stories are divided vertically into five bays, which contain niches on either side of three large windows. The auditorium contains ornamental plasterwork, a sloped orchestra level, two balconies, and a coved ceiling. The balcony level contains box seats topped by flat arches, and the proscenium opening is also a flat arch. In addition, the Longacre contains two lounges, and the top story formerly had offices.

Theatrical personality Harry Frazee acquired the site in 1911 and developed the Longacre Theatre to accommodate musicals. The Longacre opened on May 1, 1913, with the play Are You a Crook?, but the theater housed several flops in its early years. Frazee, who co-owned the theater with G. M. Anderson, sold his ownership stake in 1917 to focus on baseball. The Shubert brothers acquired the Longacre in 1924 and operated it for two decades before leasing it as a radio and television studio in 1944. The Shuberts returned the Longacre to legitimate theatrical use in 1953. The theater gained a reputation for hosting few successful productions in the late 20th century and was nearly converted to a court in the early 1990s. The Longacre was renovated in 2008.

== Site ==
The Longacre Theatre is on 220 West 48th Street, on the south sidewalk between Eighth Avenue and Broadway, near Times Square in the Theater District of Midtown Manhattan in New York City, New York, U.S. The square land lot covers 9,990 square feet (928 m^{2}), with a frontage of about 100 feet (30 m) on 48th Street and a depth of 100 feet. The Longacre shares the block with the Samuel J. Friedman Theatre to the west, the Ethel Barrymore Theatre to the south, and the Morgan Stanley Building to the east. Other nearby buildings include the Eugene O'Neill Theatre and Walter Kerr Theatre to the north; Crowne Plaza Times Square Manhattan to the northeast; 20 Times Square to the east; the Hotel Edison and Lunt-Fontanne Theatre to the south; and the Lena Horne Theatre and Paramount Hotel to the southwest.

Before the Longacre Theatre was developed, the surrounding area generally had a mixture of low-rise residences and industrial buildings. The site of the Longacre Theatre was previously occupied by a row of four residences, each of which was three stories high. At the time of the theater's construction, the site to the east contained a carriage factory, while the Union Methodist Church was across 48th Street.

== Design ==
The Longacre Theatre was designed by Henry B. Herts and constructed for baseball personality Harry Frazee. Herts had designed several Broadway theaters with his partner Hugh Tallant, including the New Amsterdam Theatre and Lyceum Theatre, but the partnership dissolved in the early 1910s. The Longacre was one of the first Broadway theaters that Herts designed alone.

=== Facade ===
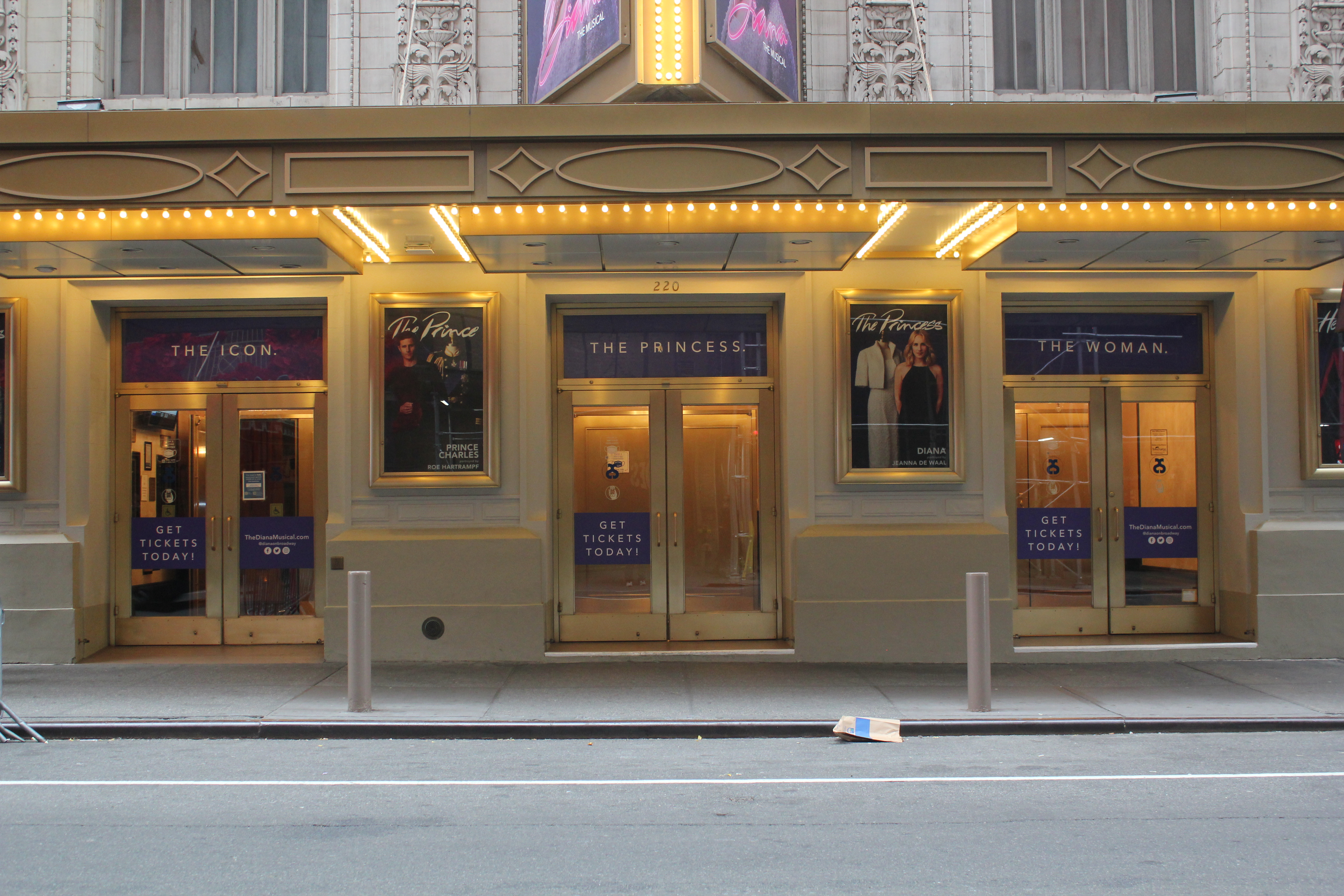
Main entrance

The main elevation of the facade faces north on 48th Street and is arranged symmetrically with classical French details. Early news articles about the theater described it as having a facade of gray limestone and terracotta, with the terracotta pieces being painted in several colors. A contemporary New-York Tribune article compared the theater to the Whitehall Palace, while a New York Times article said the theater's exterior "gives a cheerful touch of snap and cheer to the old-time structures formerly characteristic of this block". The west and east elevations contain brick walls with window openings and fire escapes.

At ground level along 48th Street, there is a water table made of granite, above which are rusticated blocks of terracotta. The ground level contains five doorways, separated by sign boards. The three center openings are each approached by a single step; each opening contains a metal-and-glass double door topped by a transom. On either side of the central doors is a recessed doorway containing metal double doors. A frieze decorated with foliate moldings, as well as a horizontal band with facets, runs above the first floor. Above all of these openings is a metal marquee. The stage door is to the left of the main entrance doors. According to early photographs, the ground-floor facade was originally composed of colored terracotta tiles, the color of which complemented the upper stories.

The upper stories are divided into five bays, separated by fluted pilasters. The lower section of each pilaster contains a floral decoration, an urn, and a niche with a female statue personifying Drama; the statues hold masks and scrolls. The pilasters are topped by Corinthian-style capitals. The three inner bays (directly above the marquee) contain double-height openings, each with a window and a transom bar that is divided horizontally into three sections. The bottoms of each window contain sills with brackets and reeded panels, while the spaces above contain curved pediments. A triangular sign is placed over the center window. The outermost two bays contain paneling, as well as corbels that support empty niches. Large billboards were originally hung over the outermost bays.

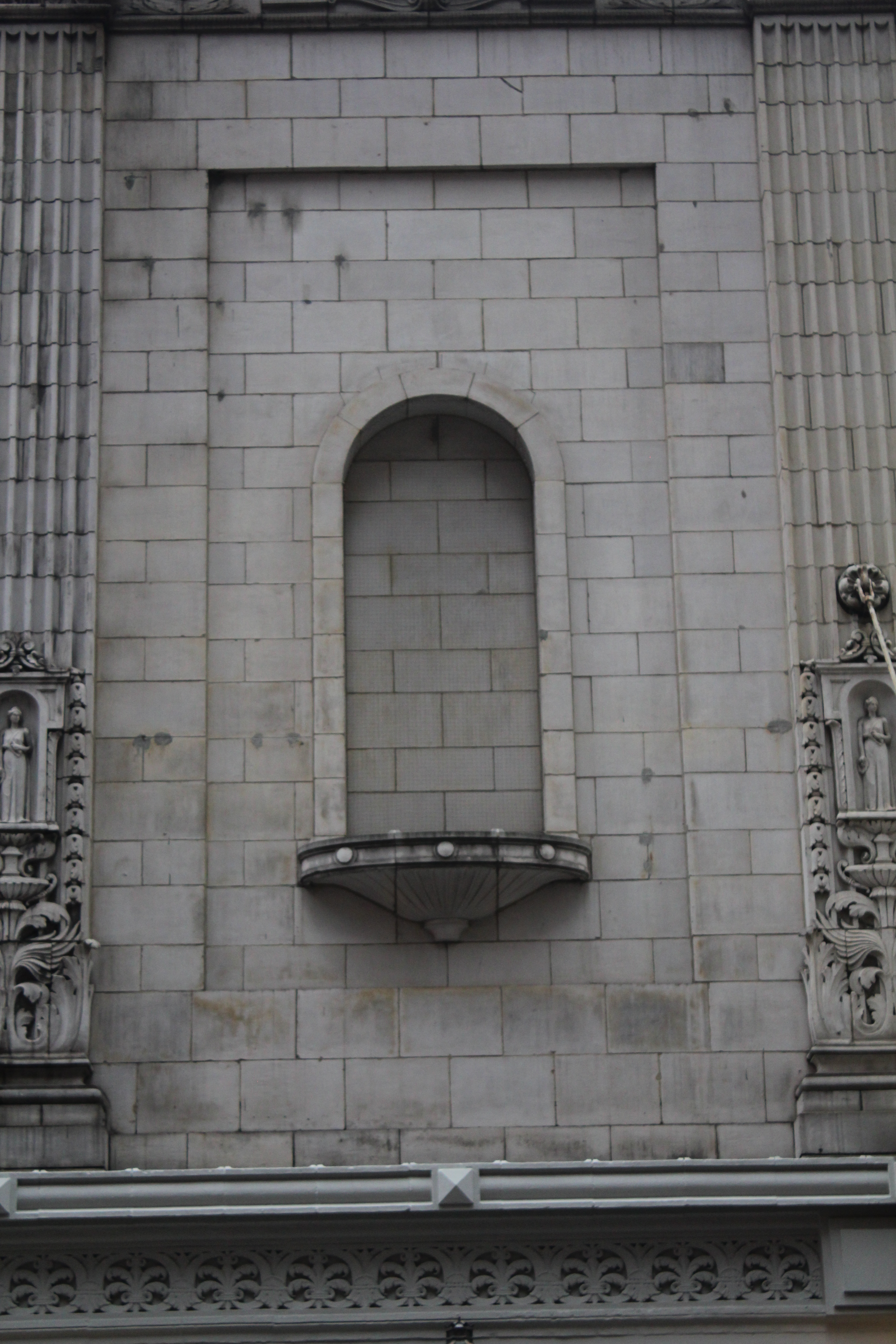
Niche in one of the outer bays

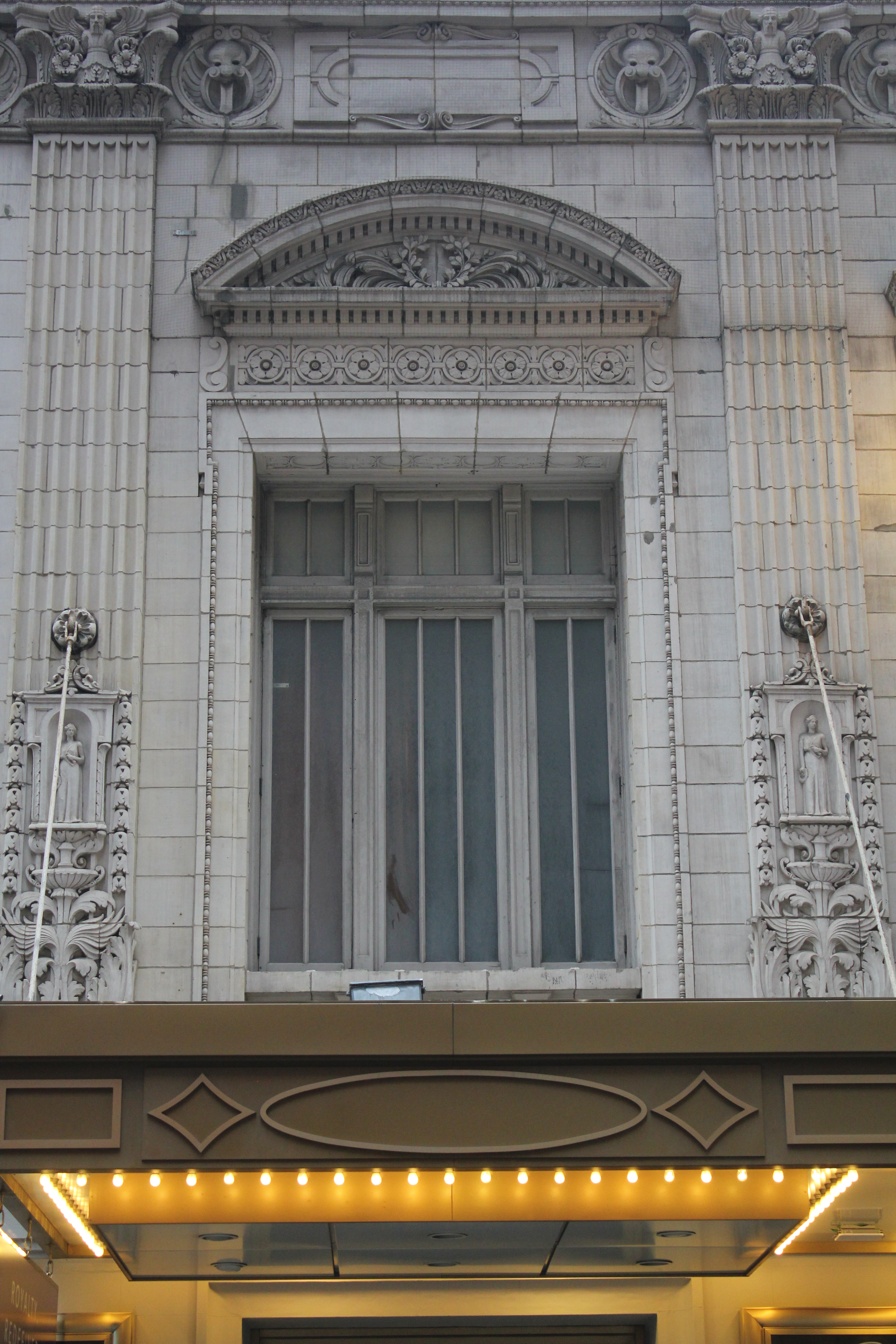
Window in one of the center bays

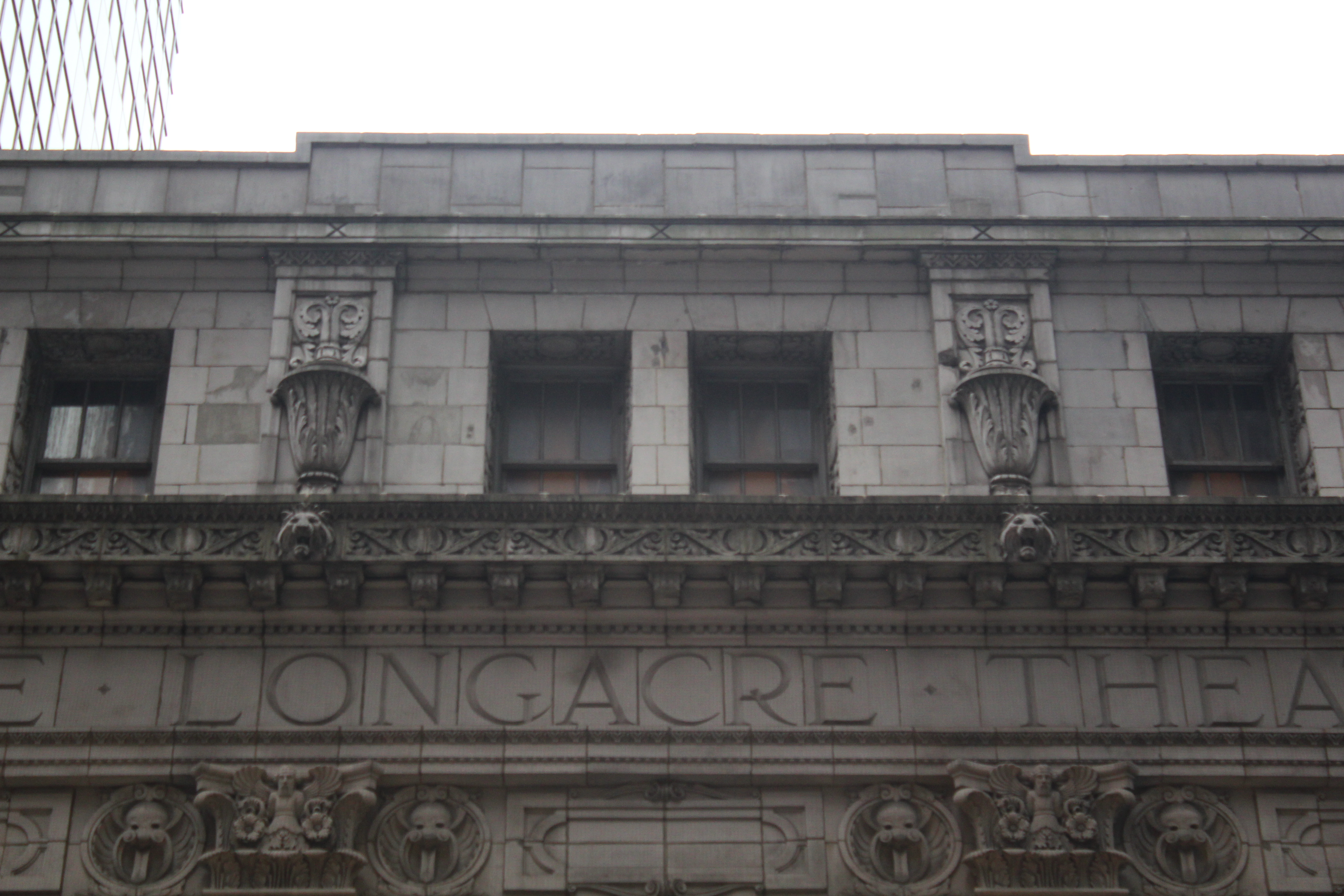
Windows in the attic

Near the top of each bay, between the pilasters' capitals, is a frieze panel in each bay. Each panel consists of an oval plaque, which is flanked by circular medallions with scallop and mask motifs. Above this, an entablature wraps across the width of the facade; it contains fluted tiles on either side of an inscription with the words "The Longacre Theatre". The entablature is topped by a cornice with modillions and lions' heads. Above the cornice is an attic story with two recessed sash windows in each bay. The interiors of the recessed window openings are decorated with medallions and foliate motifs. The attic story's bays are separated by projecting pilasters with urns and foliate decoration. There is an architrave and a parapet just below the roof.

=== Interior ===
The theater was intended to be fireproof, with stone, brick, steel, terracotta, and reinforced concrete being used in its construction. The auditorium has an orchestra level, two balconies, boxes, and a stage behind the proscenium arch. The auditorium's width is slightly greater than its depth, and the space is designed with plaster decorations in relief. The Longacre's operator The Shubert Organization cites the auditorium as having 1,077 seats; meanwhile, Playbill cites 1,045 seats and The Broadway League cites 1,091 seats. These are divided into 508 in the orchestra, 304 in the first balcony, 249 in the second balcony, and 16 in the boxes. The 1,077-seat capacity dates to a 2008 renovation, when 18 seats were removed to improve wheelchair accessibility and sight lines. The orchestra level is wheelchair-accessible via the main doors; the balcony levels are primarily accessed by steps, but there is a small wheelchair lift.

The original color scheme consisted of hues of Roman gold, with topaz carpets, wisteria seats, and gold draperies. Though the decorative scheme was described in one source as "extremely simple", the decorative motifs that did exist were highly elaborate, and some motifs were repeated multiple times. The auditorium's current color scheme, which consists of gold and green hues, dates to 2008.

The theater's lobby was originally decorated in gray-green colors, with highlights of gold and serpentine marble. The dressing rooms behind the stage are completely insulated from the auditorium by a heavy steel wall. In addition, Frazee's offices were placed above the auditorium. In a 2008 renovation, a 1,600-square-foot (150 m^{2}) basement lounge was excavated, and the attic was turned into an upper lounge with a bar and bathrooms.

==== Seating areas ====
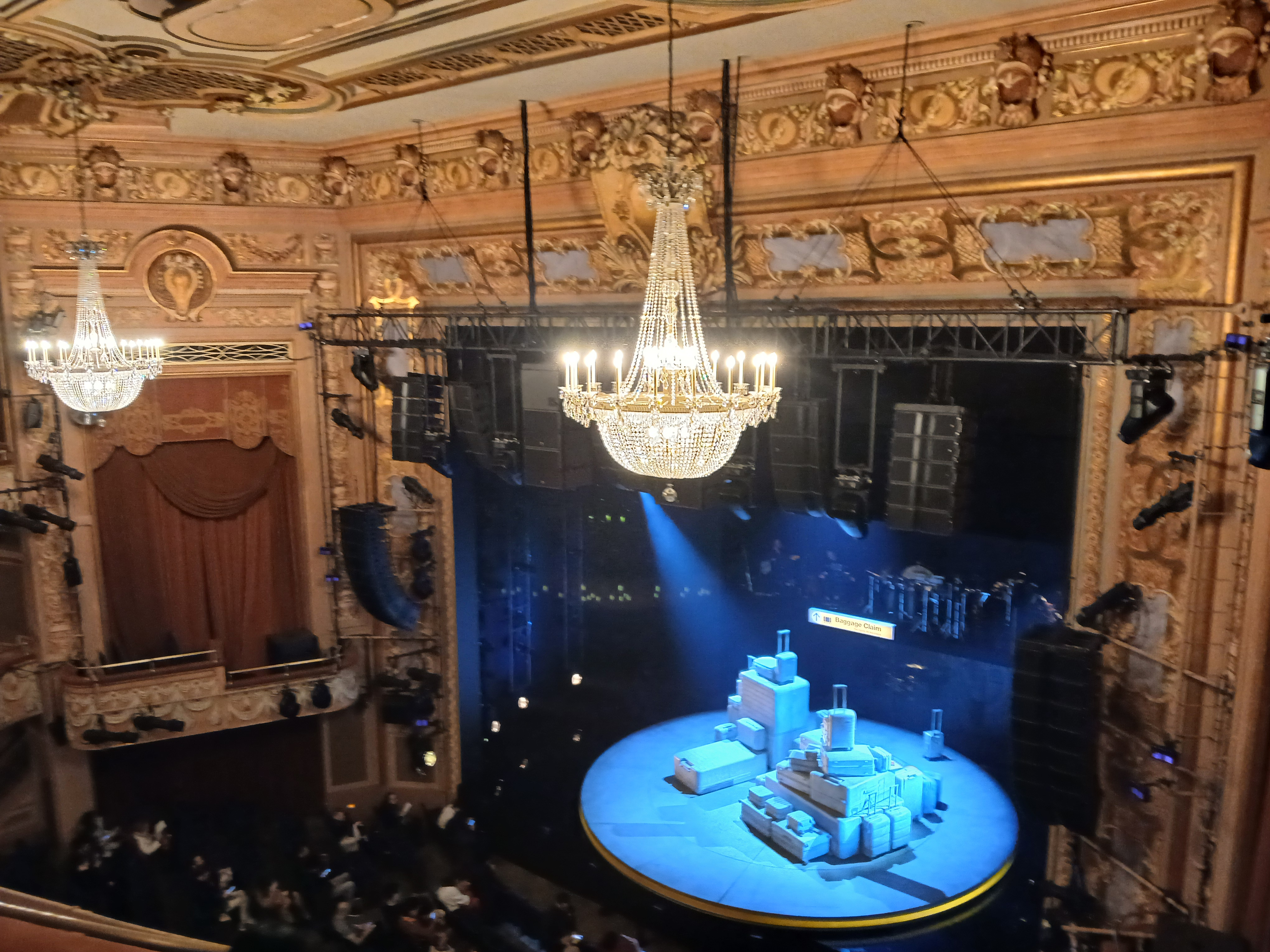
The interior, seen in 2025

The rear of the orchestra contains a promenade. The rear wall of the promenade and the side walls of the orchestra contain plasterwork paneling, as well as doorways with eared frames. The promenade ceiling has molded ribs. Staircases with wrought-iron railings lead from the promenade to the balcony levels. The orchestra is raked, sloping down toward an orchestra pit in front of the stage. The front walls of the auditorium curve inward toward the proscenium opening. The ground floor formerly had three boxes near the proscenium.

Promenades also exist behind both balcony levels. The balcony walls have similar plasterwork paneling and eared doorway frames to the orchestra level. An entablature runs atop the front portion of the second balcony's walls; it wraps above the boxes on both sides of the auditorium, as well as above the proscenium arch. There are light fixtures and air conditioning vents underneath both balcony levels, as well as a technical booth behind the second balcony's rear wall. The balcony fronts were originally decorated with plasterwork swags and fleurettes. The ornamentation on the undersides and front railings of both balconies was removed at some point after the theater's opening, then restored in 2008. The balconies are shallow and placed at a low height, a deliberate design choice that brought these seats closer to the stage.

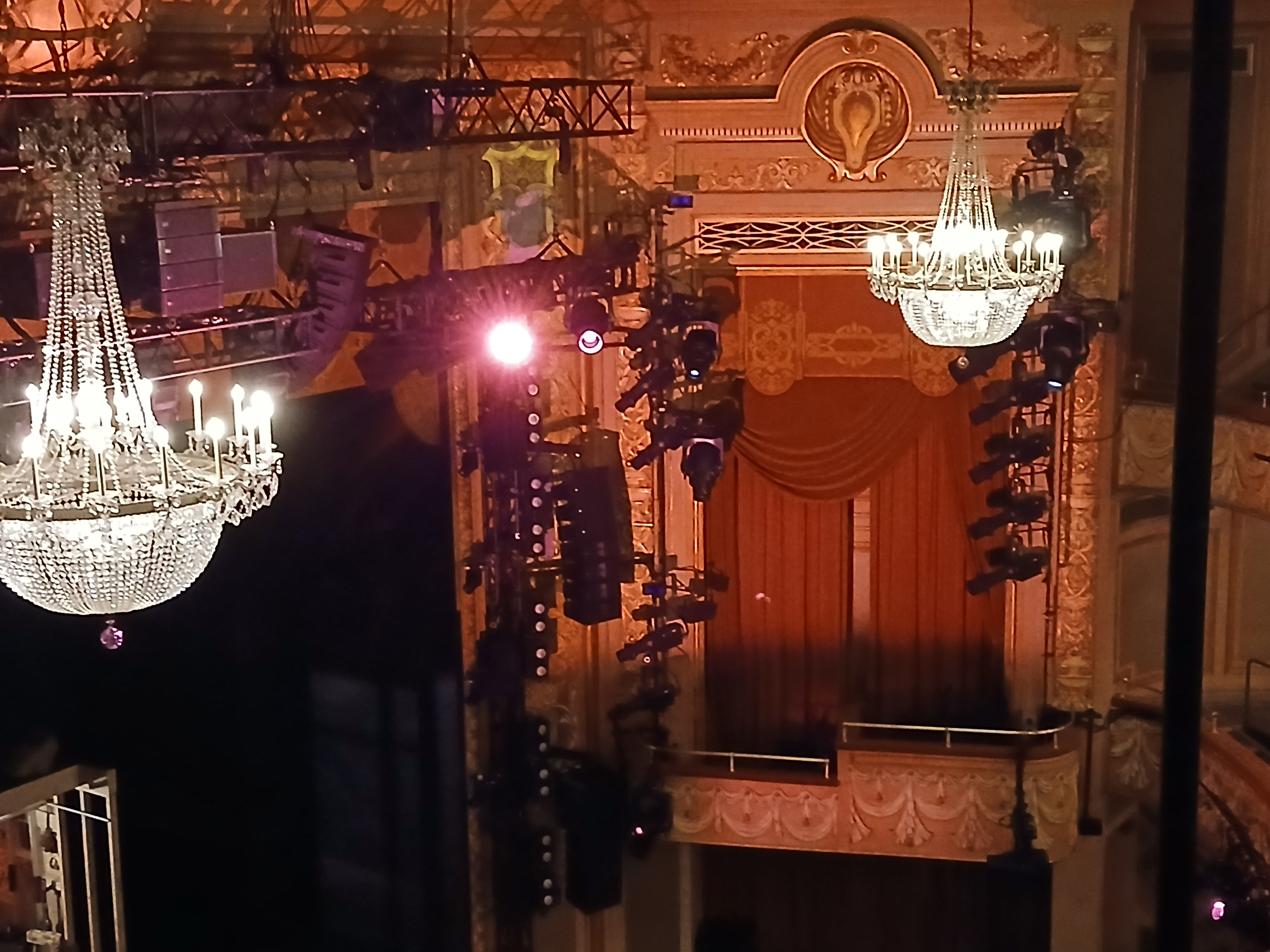
View of one of the boxes

On either side of the proscenium is one curved box at the first balcony level. The boxes are housed within flat-arched openings. As with the balconies, the boxes' fronts were originally decorated with plasterwork swags and fleurettes, but the original ornamentation on the boxes' undersides and front railings was removed after the theater's opening. The boxes' ornamentation was also restored in 2008. Above each box is an entablature with foliate motifs and a cornice with dentils. An Adam-style band surrounds each box's arch. In addition, there is an oval medallion depicting a helmet and shield, which interrupts the Adam-style band.

==== Other design features ====
Next to the boxes is a flat proscenium arch. The inner edge of the archway contains a molded band of shells. A wider band with foliate and latticework motifs also surrounds the archway. News sources from 1913 describe the band being made of gold and "breccia violet marble". Above the center of the arch is a cartouche, which is decorated with foliate motifs; the cartouche overlaps both the wide band and the entablature above it. The entablature is decorated with helmets and symbols of laurel bands, spears, and shields. The proscenium measures 34 feet 10 inches (10.62 m) high and 35 feet 0 inches (10.67 m) wide. The depth of the auditorium to the proscenium is 29 feet 7 inches (9.02 m), while the depth to the front of the stage is 32 feet 3 inches (9.83 m). The stage measures 70 feet (21 m) wide and either 36 feet (11 m) or 46 feet (14 m) deep.

The ceiling is slightly coved at its edges, though the rest of the ceiling is flat. A coved, molded band separates the ceiling into front and rear sections. A wide panel containing cartouches, foliate decoration, and latticework is placed at the front of the ceiling. Two chandeliers hang from either side of this panel. The rear section of the ceiling is semicircular and is surrounded by a band with foliate decorations.

== History ==
Times Square became the epicenter for large-scale theater productions between 1900 and the Great Depression. Manhattan's theater district had begun to shift from Union Square and Madison Square during the first decade of the 20th century. From 1901 to 1920, forty-three theaters were built around Broadway in Midtown Manhattan, including the Longacre Theatre. Harry Frazee was a theatrical personality (and later a baseball executive) from Peoria, Illinois, who entered the industry as a 16-year-old theater usher in 1896. Frazee subsequently moved to Chicago, operating theaters and producing several shows.

=== Development and early years ===
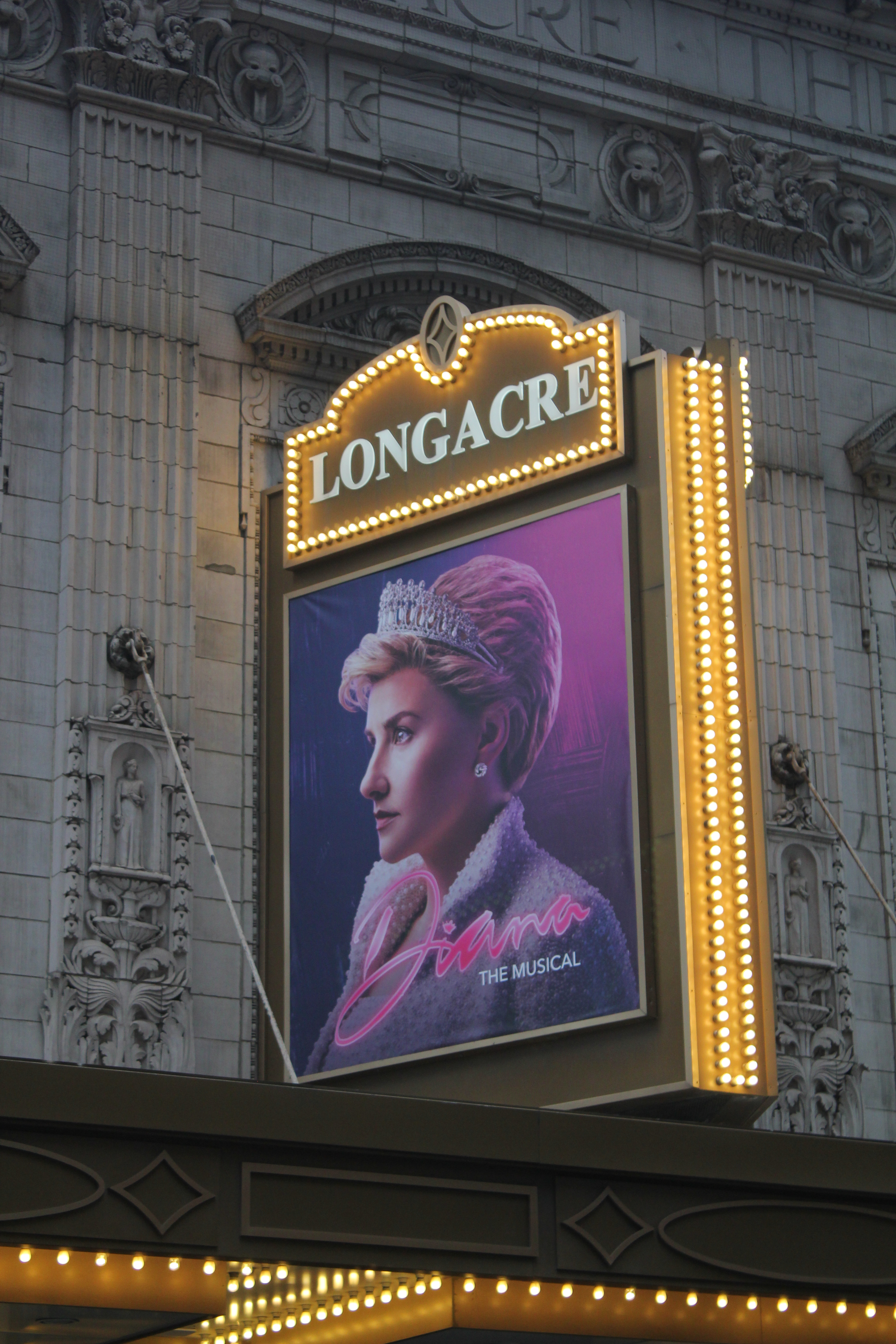
Illuminated sign

In late 1911, the lots at 220 to 228 West 48th Street were sold to Frazee and George W. Lederer. The site would be redeveloped with a theater known as the Longacre, after Times Square's former name. Several architects had already proposed designs for the theater. By January 1912, Henry B. Herts had been selected as the architect, and he filed plans for the theater that month with the New York City Department of Buildings. Frazee planned to house his own musicals at the Longacre. Construction started in May 1912 at an estimated cost of $150,000. By August 1912, the theater was reportedly near completion and scheduled to open that October. The opening was then delayed to November, and the scaffolding in front of the theater was disassembled by October. The theater's completion stalled due to "strikes and contractors' difficulties", including the bankruptcy of a contractor. Philip Bartholomae made an unsuccessful offer of $400,000 for the theater in December 1912, and work resumed shortly afterward. The delays nearly doubled the cost to $275,000.

The Longacre opened on May 1, 1913, with Are You a Crook?, a farce about criminals that closed after 12 performances. It was one of nine theaters to open in Times Square during the 1912–1913 theatrical season. The musical Adele, which opened in August 1913, was much more successful. The Longacre hosted several flops afterward. In April 1914, the theater went into foreclosure to satisfy an outstanding mortgage of $70,000, though the foreclosure proceeding was subsequently withdrawn. The same year, the Longacre hosted the melodrama A Pair of Sixes, which lasted 188 performances, and the farce Kick In with John Barrymore, which had 207 total performances. During 1915, the Longacre's productions included Inside the Lines with Lewis Stone, A Full House with May Vokes, and The Great Lover with Leo Ditrichstein.

In April 1916, Frazee and G. M. Anderson bought the Longacre Theatre; previously, they had leased it from Pincus and Goldstone. The Longacre's next hit was Nothing but the Truth, which opened in 1916 and starred William Collier Sr. for 332 performances. In November 1916, during the run of Nothing but the Truth, Frazee sold his interest in the Longacre to Anderson, L. Lawrence Weber, and F. Ray Comstock. Frazee wished to focus on managing the Boston Red Sox, which he had just acquired. The Longacre then hosted two popular shows in the late 1910s. Guy Bolton, Jerome Kern, and P. G. Wodehouse provided music for the intimate musical Leave It to Jane in 1917, while Bolton and George Middleton collaborated on Adam and Eva in 1919.

=== 1920s to early 1940s ===
The Longacre hosted Pitter Patter with William T. Kent in 1920 and The Champion with Grant Mitchell the next year. Ethel Barrymore then leased the theater in June 1922, appearing in three plays there: Rose Bernd, Romeo and Juliet, and The Laughing Lady. Another hit in 1923 was Little Jessie James, with music by Harry Archer and Harlan Thompson, which ran for 385 performances. The Shubert brothers acquired the Longacre in May 1924 for $600,000. William B. Friedlander and Con Conrad wrote the music for two of the Longacre's next works: Moonlight and Mercenary Mary. Also in 1925, George S. Kaufman produced The Butter and Egg Man, the only play Kaufman wrote without collaborating. The Longacre then staged An American Tragedy in 1926, featuring Morgan Farley and Miriam Hopkins for 216 performances, and the comedy The Command to Love the next year, which ran for 236 performances.

The Longacre's offerings in the late 1920s included Jarnegan with Richard and Joan Bennett, Hawk Island with Clark Gable, and A Primer for Lovers with Alison Skipworth. In general, the Longacre did not hold any long runs in 1930 or 1931. The shows during this time included The Matriarch in 1930 with Constance Collier and Jessica Tandy, as well as Nikki in 1931 with Fay Wray. The next hit came in 1932, when Blessed Event opened with Roger Pryor. The Longacre then staged Nine Pine Street, and Wednesday's Child. The Longacre hosted many flops during the Great Depression, sometimes with a several-month gap between productions. In March 1935, the Group Theatre premiered Clifford Odets's Till the Day I Die and Waiting for Lefty, which starred Odets, Elia Kazan, and Lee J. Cobb for 135 performances. That December, the Group Theatre staged Paradise Lost, another Odets play, at the Longacre.

The Works Progress Administration (WPA)'s Federal Theatre Project had planned to rent the Longacre in 1936, but the WPA rescinded its plan due to protests from stagehand unions. Artef, a Yiddish theatre group, was also negotiating for the Longacre. The Longacre's productions during this time included a Hedda Gabler revival with Alla Nazimova, followed by The Lady Has a Heart with Elissa Landi. The Longacre hosted Paul Osborn's On Borrowed Time in 1938, which ran for 321 performances. Another Osborn play, Morning's at Seven in 1939, had a 44-performance run at the Longacre (though its 1980 Broadway revival was far more successful). In the early 1940s, the Longacre was generally filled by productions with less than 100 performances. The major exception to this was Three's a Family, which opened in 1943 and ran for 497 performances.

=== Mid-1940s to 1960s ===
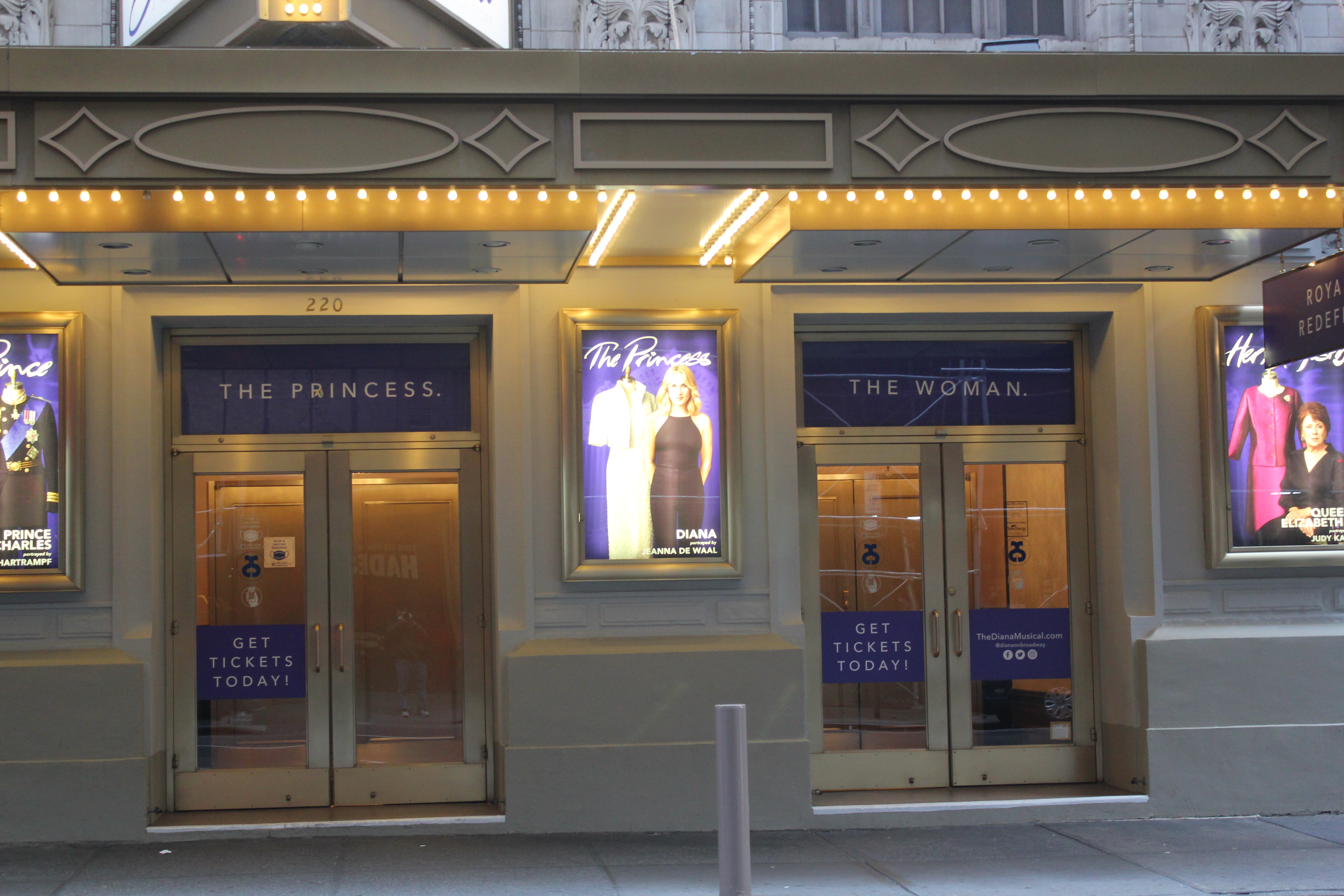
Entrance

By April 1944, the Shuberts were planning to relocate Three Is a Family so the Longacre could be leased to the Mutual Broadcasting System (MBS) for use as a broadcast studio. The next month, MBS signed a five-year lease. A year after moving into the theater, MBS added some offices on the Longacre's top story to alleviate crowding at its other buildings. The Longacre also served as the home of AM radio station WOR, which used the theater for shows like Broadway Talks Back, as well as The American Forum of the Air starting in 1947. The Longacre was the only MBS studio that allowed audiences, but WOR (which was operated by MBS) did not allow audiences at its broadcasts. Because the theater was being used as a studio, the Shuberts refused to comply with a 1948 ordinance that would have required any theater showing legitimate plays to give 2 percent of profits to the city government. By 1949, as a result of a shortage of studios in New York City, MBS rival CBS had started broadcasting This is Broadway from the Longacre.

Ultimately, the Longacre was used as a radio and television studio for nine and a half years. The Broadway theatre industry had improved by mid-1953, when a shortage of available theaters prompted the Shuberts to return the Longacre to legitimate productions. The first production at the newly reopened Longacre was Dorothy Parker and Arnaud d'Usseau's Ladies of the Corridor, which opened in October 1953. Ladies of the Corridor was not a success, and neither was Jean Anouilh's Mademoiselle Colombe in 1954. More successful was Lillian Hellman's version of Anouilh's The Lark, which opened in 1955 and featured Julie Harris, Boris Karloff, and Christopher Plummer. This was followed in 1957 by Fair Game, which featured Sam Levene and Ellen Burstyn. Another hit at the Longacre was Samuel Taylor's 1958 comedy The Pleasure of His Company, which featured Cornelia Otis Skinner, Walter Abel, Dolores Hart, George Peppard, Cyril Ritchard, and Charlie Ruggles.

Eugène Ionesco's Rhinoceros opened at the Longacre in 1961 and featured Zero Mostel. A transfer of Ossie Davis's Purlie Victorious followed at the end of the same year. The Longacre also hosted Henry Denker's A Case of Libel in 1963, with Sidney Blackmer, Larry Gates, and Van Heflin, followed in 1964 by Lorraine Hansberry's The Sign in Sidney Brustein's Window with Gabriel Dell and Rita Moreno. In 1966, the theater hosted a short run of Tennessee Williams's Slapstick Tragedy (composed of The Mutilated and The Gnadiges Fraulein), Hal Holbrook's solo show Mark Twain Tonight!, and a solo appearance by Gilbert Bécaud. Holbrook, Teresa Wright, and Lillian Gish starred in Robert Anderson's play Never Sang for My Father at the Longacre in 1968. The National Theatre of the Deaf also performed at the Longacre for a limited engagement in 1969.

=== 1970s and 1980s ===
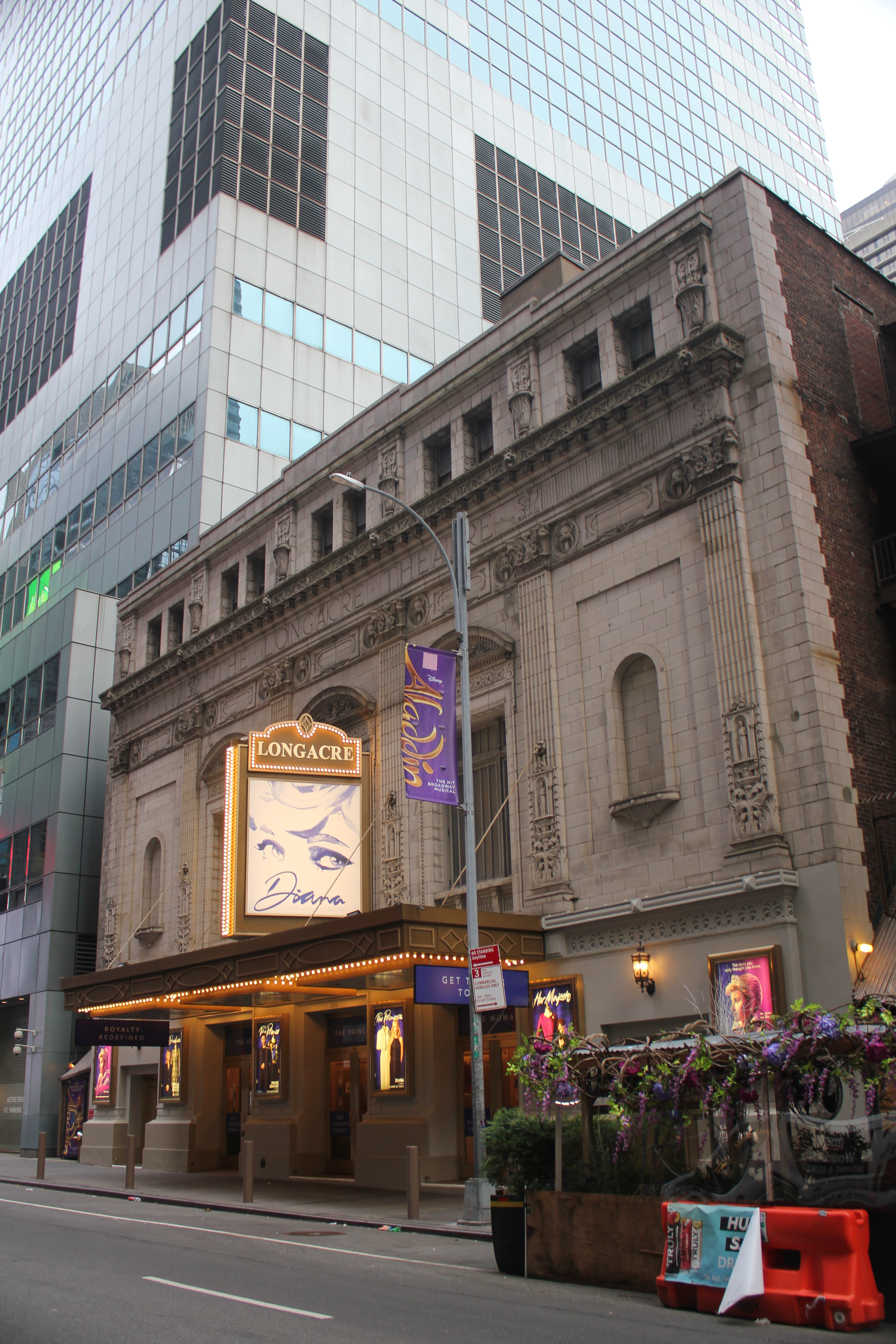
Viewed from the west

William Goldman's 1969 book The Season: A Candid Look at Broadway had specifically cited the Longacre as a flop theater. Goldman wrote that the Longacre was not near many other theaters, especially as compared with venues on 45th Street, and claimed that the Longacre hosted weak shows because its owners "could only get dreck to play there". According to theatrical historian Louis Botto, this reinforced "the notion that no hits open there", creating a cycle of flops in the early 1970s. Some productions during this time, such as Keep Off the Grass (1972), limited the audience to 499 because a 500-seat house would require negotiations with Broadway theatrical unions. The Longacre finally saw a hit in 1975 with the opening of The Ritz, which featured Moreno, Jerry Stiller, and Jack Weston for 400 performances. Julie Harris starred in the solo The Belle of Amherst in 1976. This was followed by revivals of No Man's Land, The Basic Training of Pavlo Hummel, and Jesus Christ Superstar. At some point during the 1970s, the interior was painted over in a cream color.

In 1978, the Fats Waller revue Ain't Misbehavin' opened at the Longacre, ultimately seeing 1,604 performances over three theaters. The Longacre's next hit was Children of a Lesser God with Phyllis Frelich and John Rubinstein, which opened in 1980 and had 887 performances. The Longacre often remained dark for several consecutive months during the 1980s, and a 1987 New York Times article reported that the theater had been empty for 201 of the past 208 weeks. Shows during the decade included Passion, Play Memory, Harrigan 'N Hart, A Day in the Death of Joe Egg, Precious Sons, The Musical Comedy Murders of 1940, Don't Get God Started, and Hizzoner!. A video for the song The Rum Tum Tugger, from the musical Cats, was also shot at the Longacre during one of its dark periods in 1984. During the late 1980s, the Shuberts renovated the Longacre as part of a restoration program for their Broadway theaters.

The New York City Landmarks Preservation Commission (LPC) had started considering protecting the Longacre as a landmark in 1982, with discussions continuing over the next several years. The LPC designated the Longacre's facade and interior as a landmark on December 8, 1987. This was part of the LPC's wide-ranging effort in 1987 to grant landmark status to Broadway theaters. The New York City Board of Estimate ratified the designations in March 1988. The Shuberts, the Nederlanders, and Jujamcyn collectively sued the LPC in June 1988 to overturn the landmark designations of 22 theaters, including the Longacre, on the merit that the designations severely limited the extent to which the theaters could be modified. The lawsuit was escalated to the New York Supreme Court and the Supreme Court of the United States, but these designations were ultimately upheld in 1992.

=== 1990s and 2000s ===
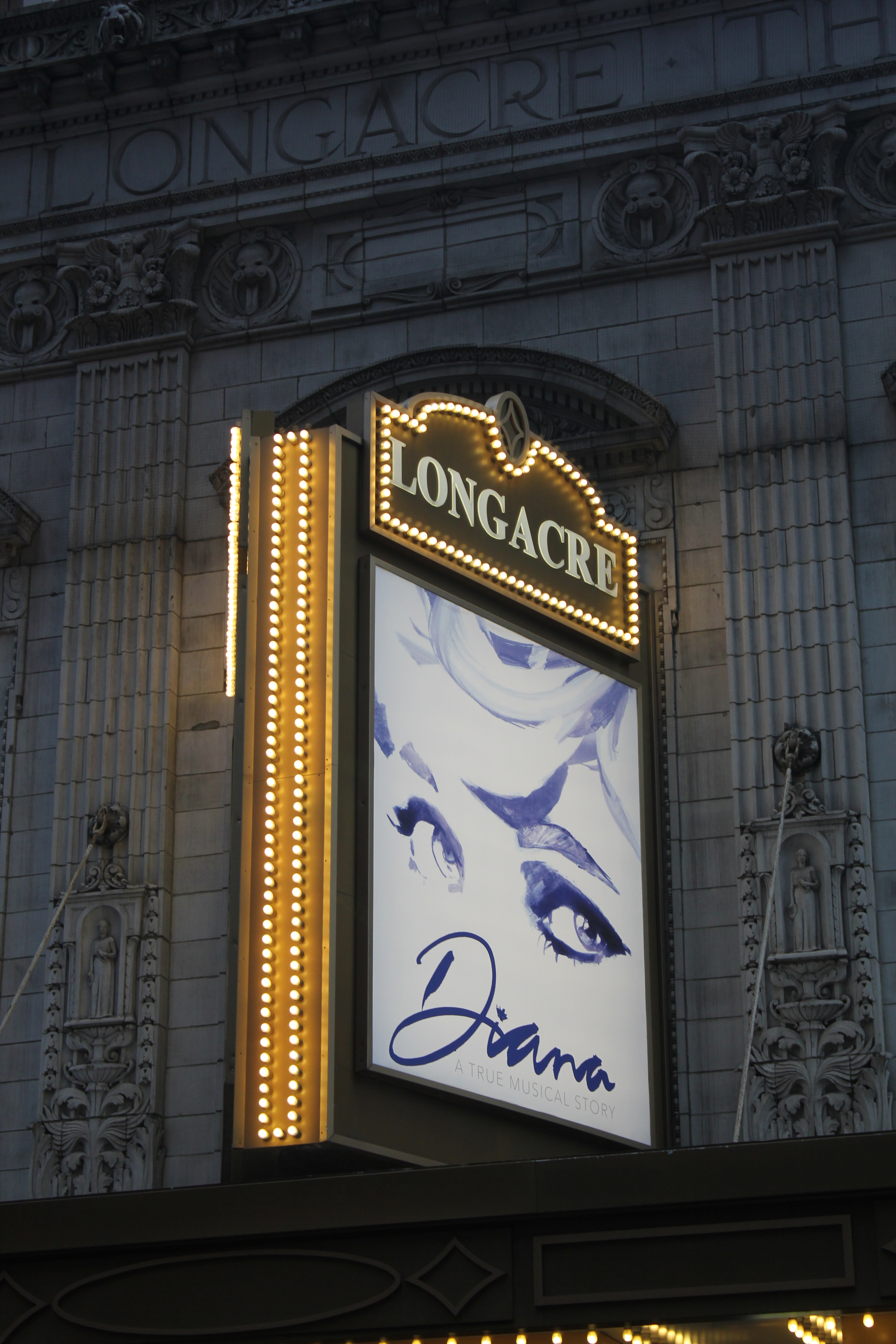
Side view of sign on the facade

The Longacre hosted the musical Truly Blessed, a showcase of Mahalia Jackson's music, for a month in 1990. No other shows had been staged when, in November 1991, the city and state government officials proposed setting up a community courtroom in the theater to process misdemeanor summonses. The Shubert Organization was to donate the space for three years. Theatrical personalities heavily opposed the plan, not only because it would require extensive renovations, but also because another Broadway house (the Mark Hellinger Theatre) had been converted to non-theatrical use. Another site for the court was eventually identified, (Note: Now the Midtown Community Court on 54th Street) and the Longacre returned to legitimate use with a short run of Tango Pasion in April 1993. Frank D. Gilroy's Any Given Day also had a short run of 32 performances the same year. A revival of Medea with Diana Rigg was hosted in 1994, followed by a short run of Phillip Hayes Dean's Paul Robeson with Avery Brooks in 1995.

Horton Foote's The Young Man from Atlanta opened at the Longacre in 1997, followed by David Henry Hwang's Golden Child the next year. The Longacre then hosted The Gershwins' Fascinating Rhythm in April 1999 and John Pielmeier's Voices in the Dark that August. In 2001, the Longacre hosted two brief runs: Judgment at Nuremberg and A Thousand Clowns. The musical One Mo' Time ran for only three weeks in 2002, while Russell Simmons Def Poetry Jam opened later that year and ran six months. As part of a settlement with the United States Department of Justice in 2003, the Shuberts agreed to improve disabled access at their 16 landmarked Broadway theaters, including the Longacre. The Longacre then had two major flops: The Oldest Living Confederate Widow Tells All (2003), which closed after one performance, and Prymate (2004), which lasted five performances. A revival of Who's Afraid of Virginia Woolf? opened in 2005, followed by a transfer of the off-Broadway hit Well in 2006. The Longacre had no productions for about a year until Talk Radio opened in March 2007.

After Talk Radio ended, the Longacre was closed for a $12 million renovation by Kostow Greenwood Architects. The marquee was replaced and the climate control system was refurbished. The interior spaces were extensively rebuilt with new seats and lounges, as well as restored decorations, including an approximation of the original color scheme. Original decorative elements, removed in previous renovations, were restored to the balcony and boxes. The theater reopened in May 2008 with the farce Boeing Boeing, which ran until the following January; Boeing Boeing's 279-performance run was the longest of any production at the Longacre in almost three decades. The next hit was Burn the Floor, which opened in August 2009 and ran for five months.

=== 2010s to present ===
La Cage aux Folles opened at the Longacre in 2010; one of the production's performers, Kelsey Grammer, had his wedding on the Longacre's stage the next year. Other productions in the early 2010s included Chinglish in 2011, Magic/Bird and The Performers in 2012, First Date the Musical in 2013, Of Mice and Men and You Can't Take It with You in 2014, and Allegiance in 2015. The Longacre was supposed to host the musical Nerds in 2016, but the production never even held previews. Instead, the theater hosted A Bronx Tale in 2016, The Prom in 2018, and The Lightning Thief in 2019. A Bronx Tale achieved the box office record for the theater, grossing $1,293,125.32 over nine performances for the week ending January 1, 2017. During the run of The Prom, in 2019, Broadway's first known onstage wedding happened at the Longacre between two women.

The theater temporarily closed on March 12, 2020, due to the COVID-19 pandemic. It reopened on November 2, 2021, with previews of Diana, which ran seven weeks. A limited revival of the play Macbeth opened in April 2022, followed by the play Leopoldstadt in October 2022. The Broadway transfer of the musical Lempicka, based on the life of Tamara de Lempicka, opened at the theater in April 2024. This was followed in November 2024 by the musical Swept Away, which ran for a month. The musical Dead Outlaw opened at the Longacre in April 2025, followed by Two Strangers (Carry a Cake Across New York) that November, which is scheduled to close in November 2026 after 428 performances. It is planned to be followed by a revival of Three Days of Rain in March 2027.

== Notable productions ==
Productions are listed by the year of their first performance. This list only includes Broadway shows; it does not include programs broadcast from there.

Notable productions at the theater
Opening year	Name	Refs.
1913	Adele	
1914	A Pair of Sixes	
1914	Secret Strings	
1917	Leave It to Jane	
1919	Ghosts	
1919	Adam and Eva	
1921	Nobody's Money	
1923	Rose Bernd	
1923	Romeo and Juliet	
1923	Little Jessie James	
1925	The Butter and Egg Man	
1930	Ritzy	
1934	Wednesday's Child	
1935	Till the Day I Die/Waiting for Lefty	
1935	Kind Lady	
1935	Paradise Lost	
1936	Hedda Gabler	
1938	On Borrowed Time	
1939	Wuthering Heights	
1939	The Three Sisters	
1939	Morning's at Seven	
1940	Leave Her to Heaven	
1940	Johnny Belinda	
1942	Hedda Gabler	
1954	Mademoiselle Colombe	
1954	The Burning Glass	
1954	The Tender Trap	
1955	Tea and Sympathy	
1955	The Honeys	
1955	The Lark	
1957	Holiday for Lovers	
1959	An Evening With Yves Montand	
1961	The Rhinoceros	
1961	Purlie Victorious	
1964	The Sign in Sidney Brustein's Window	
1966	Mark Twain Tonight	
1966	The Mutilated/The Gnadiges Fraulein	
1966	A Hand Is on the Gate	
1966	Gilbert Becaud on Broadway	
1967	Daphne in Cottage D	
1968	Cactus Flower	
1970	Candida	
1970	Les Blancs	
1971	The Me Nobody Knows	
1972	The Sign in Sidney Brustein's Window	
1974	Thieves	
1975	The Ritz	
1976	The Belle of Amherst	
1976	Checking Out	
1976	No Man's Land	
1977	The Basic Training of Pavlo Hummel	
1977	Jesus Christ Superstar	
1978	Ain't Misbehavin'	
1979	Faith Healer	
1979	Bosoms and Neglect	
1979	But Never Jam Today	
1980	Children of a Lesser God	
1983	Passion	
1985	Harrigan 'N Hart	
1985	A Day in the Death of Joe Egg	
1987	The Musical Comedy Murders of 1940	
1993	Tony Bennett: Steppin' Out on Broadway	
1994	Medea	
1997	The Young Man From Atlanta	
1998	Golden Child	
2001	Judgment at Nuremberg	
2001	A Thousand Clowns	
2002	One Mo' Time	
2002	Russell Simmons Def Poetry Jam	
2005	Who's Afraid of Virginia Woolf?	
2006	Well	
2007	Talk Radio	
2008	Boeing Boeing	
2009	Burn the Floor	
2010	La Cage aux Folles	
2011	Chinglish	
2012	Magic/Bird	
2012	The Performers	
2013	First Date the Musical	
2014	Of Mice and Men	
2014	You Can't Take It with You	
2015	Allegiance	
2016	A Bronx Tale	
2018	The Prom	
2019	The Lightning Thief	
2021	Diana	
2022	Macbeth	
2022	Leopoldstadt	
2024	Lempicka	
2024	Swept Away	
2025	Dead Outlaw	
2025	Two Strangers (Carry a Cake Across New York)	
2027	Three Days of Rain	

== See also ==
- List of Broadway theaters
- List of New York City Designated Landmarks in Manhattan from 14th to 59th Streets
