= Harry Archer (composer) =

American composer and orchestra leader

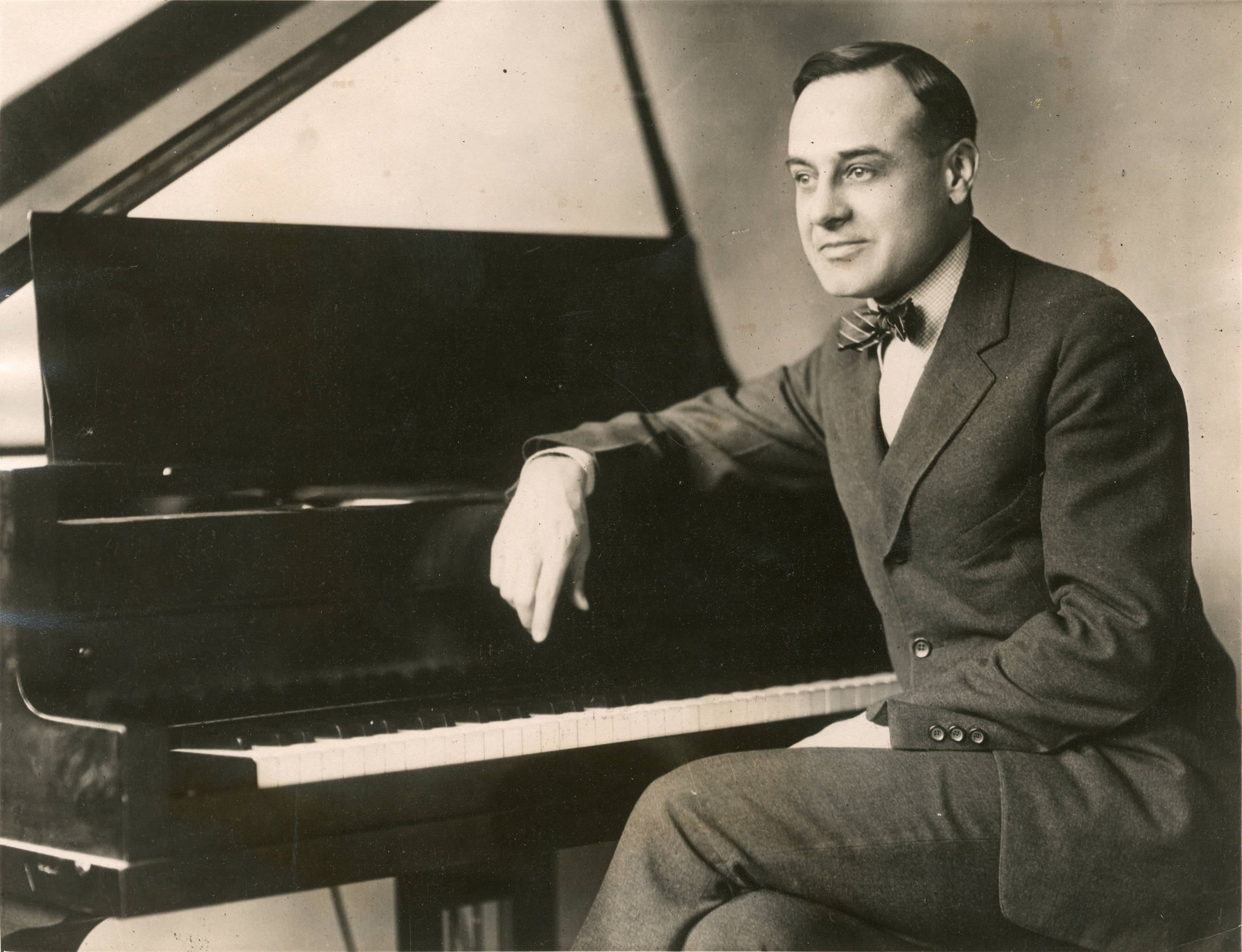
- Harry Archer in 1924
- Born: February 21, 1888; Creston, Iowa, US
- Died: April 23, 1960 (aged 72); New York City, US
- Occupation(s): composer and orchestra leader

Harry Archer (February 21, 1888 – April 23, 1960) was an American composer and orchestra leader. He is best remembered for six Broadway shows from the 2nd and 3rd decades of the 20th-century, but also made several popular recordings in the 1920s for Brunswick Records.

== Biography ==
Harry Archer was born as Harry Auracher on February 21, 1888 in Creston, Iowa. He received his high-school education at Michigan Military Academy, and his post-secondary education at Knox College and also at Princeton University. He played brass instruments, mastering the range of that class with the exception of the French Horn, and also was a proficient pianist.

Archer’s compositions had appeared in plays as early as 1911, but the first play he wrote the score for was Pearl Maiden in 1912. This play starred Jefferson De Angelis and Flora Zabelle in a plot that owed much to Florodora. The music was considerably better reviewed than the plot. The play had a tenure of 24 performances in New York, then travelled to Boston and then lesser locations. For a time he led a dance orchestra in Chicago, then spent some working in the Paul Whiteman orchestra, during which time he composed sporadically for various theatre productions and scored a few plays which were flops.

Paul Whiteman was asked to provide an orchestra for Little Jessie James, and Archer was designated to lead the outfit, as well as provide songs and orchestrations. This show was a huge success, and was not only staged on Broadway but also as far afield as Germany and Hungary. The breakout song was "I Love You", which was the biggest hit of Archer’s career. Lyrics for this show were by Harlan Thompson. The success of the show led to Archer’s scoring of several further 1920s musicals, but none were as successful as Little Jesse James. Paradise Alley, a 1922 offering, was revived in 1924 and also produced in Australia but the show was considered old fashioned and lacked the spark of the Archer-Thompson pairing. The two continued to work together, producing My Girl, Merry Merry and Twinkle Twinkle between 1924 and 1926, all of which were modest successes. The 1928 show Just a Minute was not a success, and Archer’s career on Broadway ended at this point.

Archer did continue to compose, and his songs continued to be used in the theatre. He composed and scored for off-broadway productions at such places as the Provincetown Playhouse. Plans to revive a re-worked Little Jesse James later in his life never came to fruition. He died in New York City, April 23, 1960.

Archer’s music is considered “lightly jazzy” and catchy, he was best suited to the farcical librettist Thompson. Archer also worked extensively with Howard Johnson. Despite his string of successful shows in the mid 1920s, Archer never became a “fashionable” composer, and has become obscure since his heyday.

== Recordings ==
Archer began recording for Brunswick Records and their subsidiary Vocalion in November 1925. Often the same recording would be used on both labels, but a pseudonym of The Vanderbilt Orchestra was used on the Vocalion label. The recordings most often utilized studio vocalists such as Irving Kaufman and Franklyn Baur. The recordings proved popular, and Joel Whitburn estimates that three were top-20 hits. In 1926 his recording of "Sweet and Low-Down" (Brunswick 3096) is listed at #10. "When Day Is Done" (Brunswick 3399) from 1927 is listed at #14. His last recording session took place on January 23, 1928, but a final #20 hit from March, 1928 "Thinking of You" (Brunswick 3704) was to follow.

== Shows ==
- 1912 – Pearl Maiden
- 1919 – Love for Sale
- 1921 – Peek-a-boo
- 1922 – Paradise Alley
- 1923 – Little Jessie James
- 1924 – Paradise Alley (revival)
- 1924 – My Girl
- 1925 – Merry Merry
- 1926 – Twinkle Twinkle
- 1928 – Just a Minute
- 1945 – Entre Nous

== Selected compositions ==
- “Alone In My Dreams”
- “Anything Your Heart Desires” from Just a Minute – 1928
- “Before the Dawn” from My Girl – 1924
- “The Break-Me-Down” from Just a Minute – 1928
- “Desert Isle” from My Girl – 1924
- “Ev’ry Little Note”
- “Find a Girl” from Twinkle, Twinkle – 1925
- “From Broadway to Main Street” from Little Jesse James – 1923
- “Get a Load of This” from Twinkle, Twinkle – 1925
- “A Girl Like You” from My Girl – 1924
- “Heigh-Ho Cheerio” from Just a Minute – 1928
- “I Love You” from Little Jesse James – 1923
- “I Was Blue” from Merry, Merry – 1925
- “I’d Rather Be the Girl in Your Arms” – 1926
- “I’m Goin’ to Dance with the Guy What Brung Me”
- “It Must Be Love” from Merry, Merry – 1925
- “Little Jesse James” from Little Jesse James – 1923
- “My Home Town in Kansas” from Little Jesse James – 1923
- “My Own”
- “Pretty, Petite and Sweet” from Just a Minute – 1928
- “Rainbow”
- “Suppose I Had Never Met You”
- “Sweet and Low” – 1930
- “The Sweetest Girl This Side of Heaven”
- “Twinkle, Twinkle” from Twinkle, Twinkle – 1925
- “Where the Golden Daffodils Grow” – 1930
- “White Sails” – 1939
- “You and I” from My Girl – 1924
- “You Know, I Know” from Twinkle, Twinkle – 1925
