= Tab show =

A tab show was a short, or tabloid version, of various popular musical comedies performed in the United States in the early 20th century.

== History ==
The shows were about an hour in length but could be as short as 25 minutes, either way being well suited for traveling or road shows. They had lower costs and fewer logistical complications than major productions. To achieve this, producers typically eliminated much of the dialogue, plot and chorus of the parent, often Broadway production, reduced the scenery to a few flats and platforms that could be easily transported by rail or roadway, and retained only the hit numbers and the principal characters including the love interests and the chief comic. With this shortened format, tab shows did not usually serve as an entertainment form in themselves but were adjuncts for at least three other forms of major entertainment. First, they could be the featured act of the second half of a vaudeville bill. The substitution of these shows for a portion of vaudeville acts in the early 1900s was described as "far-reaching in its scope" in a Billboard article of 23 December 1911.

Second, they were often performed in conjunction with silent films for a half hour performance either before the film came on, or as a vaudeville act between films. Show Boat was one Broadway hit that was reduced to a truncated tab show running in movie theaters in the early 1930s.

Third, tab shows were closely related to the early, non-stripper versions of burlesque. The girls were 'clean' and did not have bare legs. By the 1920s, "tab show" was sometimes used to avoid the negative, low-brow connotations of "burlesque".

There are two suggestions for the origin of the word "tab". It is often said to be derived from "tabloid", as in the short form of a newspaper. Alternatively, it could refer to "tableau" as in the tab style of curtain across the front of a stage, since the curtain and a few pieces of furniture might be the only scenery used by a tab show.

As variations on these themes, tab shows occasionally were up to two hours in length and with their lower costs and fewer logistic demands, were a popular alternative to vaudeville acts in the 1910s. Also, while the term "tab show" may have been restricted to the United States, the theme of the vicissitudes of traveling third-rate vaudevillians was presented in 1950 in Federico Fellini's Italian film Variety Lights. It has been described as "wholesome corn".
