= L. Lawrence Weber =

American theatre manager

- Born: 1869; New York City, New York, US
- Died: 22 February 1940 (aged 70–71); New York City, New York, US
- Occupations: Stage and film producer and theater manager

L. Lawrence Weber (c. 1872 – 22 February 1940) was an American sports promoter, stage show producer and theater manager. He was active in arranging vaudeville shows, legitimate theater and films. He once tried to bypass laws against importing a boxing film to the US by projecting it on a screen just across the border in Canada and filming the screening from the USA side.

== Early years ==
L. Lawrence Weber was born in New York City in 1869. At the age of thirteen, in 1882, he organized a company of young amateur minstrels who toured Long Island, New York. He posted the company's bills, took tickets and performed on stage. In 1883, he joined the Excelsior Minstrels. For a period Weber was the secretary of the British Minister to Japan, and became the American representative of the Japanese Government Tea Syndicate. In 1897, Weber was proprietor of Weber's Olympia Company and the Marion Extravaganza Company. These consisted of two touring theater companies and two other attractions.

Weber became one of the leaders of the Columbia burlesque wheel, or the Eastern Wheel, with Samuel Scribner and Gus Hill, later to be part of the Columbia Amusement Company. They wanted to attract women to their shows, and promoted relatively clean entertainment. In 1908, they banned wrestling and prize fighting from their circuit. However, Columbia set up a second circuit in 1915, the American Burlesque Association, that staged raunchier shows.

On 4 December 1910, Weber announced a plan to form a circuit of popular theaters, the Lawrence Weber Co-operative Booking Circuit. The investors were Weber, Sam A. Scribner, John Herbert Mack and Rudolph K. Hynicka. They planned to acquire forty theaters in cities around the United States and Canada, and to supply them with forty theater companies playing in rotation. They would put on equal numbers of melodramas, society plays, comedy dramas, farce comedies and musical comedies, charging popular prices. The partners were all associated with the "Eastern Wheel" of burlesque theaters, which had a similar business model. In 1914, Weber joined The Lambs Club.

== Cinema ==
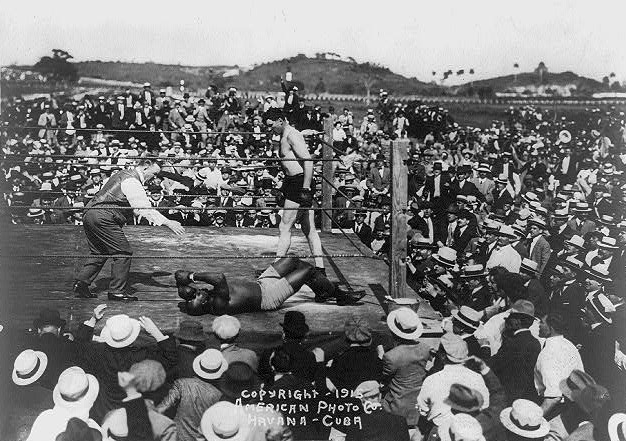
The knock-out in the 1915 Johnson-Willard fight

Weber was one of the sponsors of a film made of a boxing match in Havana, Cuba, on 5 April 1915 between Jack Johnson and Jess Willard. He obtained the copyright on the film. He was refused permission to import it on the basis of a Federal law prohibiting import of such films for public exhibition. (Note: The laws prohibiting movement of films of prize fights was due to concerns about racial violence caused by exhibiting films in which a black man was shown beating a white man.) Weber argued that this law was not constitutional, since it infringed on the rights of states. The case was heard in the Supreme Court in December 1915, and decided against Weber. In 1916, Weber made a widely publicized attempt to bypass the restriction. He set up a motion picture camera 8 inches (200 mm) south of the border between New York and Canada, pointing to a screen on the Canadian side on which each frame of the film of the 1915 Havana fight was projected, thus creating a duplicate negative. He lost the court case that followed on the basis that he had violated the spirit of the law.

Weber, Bobby North, Aaron Hoffman and Harry J. Cohen organized Popular Plays and Players, the precursor of Metro Pictures. In 1914, the Popular Plays and Players production company issued a film version of Jules Verne's Michael Strogoff. In March 1915, Weber, whom Variety described as a "colorful showman, sports promoter", was involved in founding Metro Pictures. As of June 1915, Weber was acting head of Popular Plays and Players.

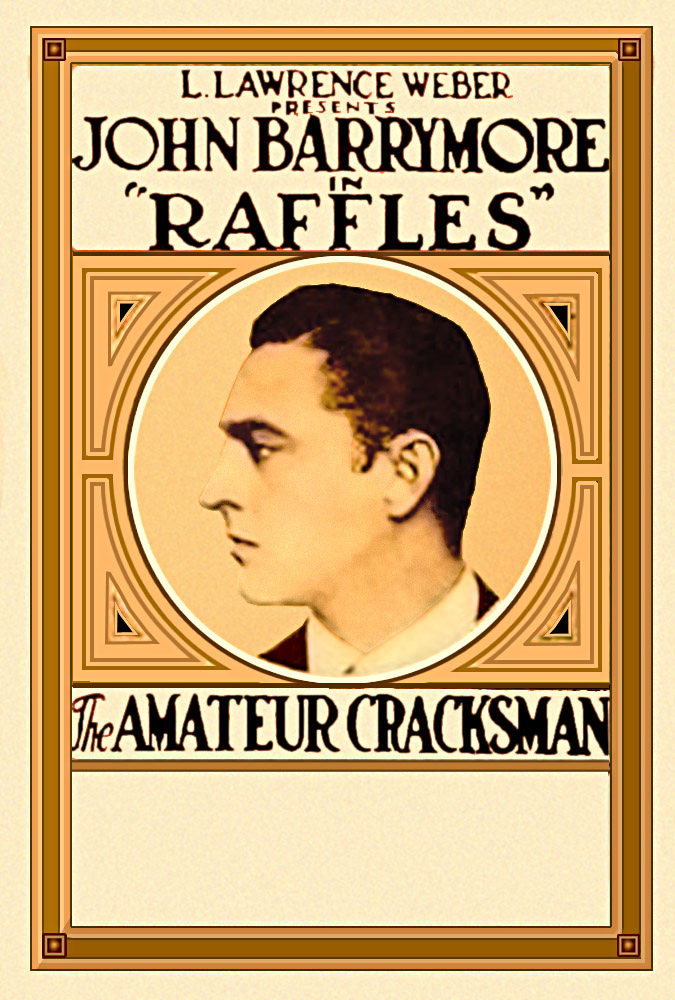
Film poster for Raffles, the Amateur Cracksman (1917)

Weber later formed the L. Lawrence Weber Photodrama Corporation to make films, and in 1917, made Raffles, the Amateur Cracksman, starring John Barrymore. Variety said, "By virtue of its artistry, intensely sustained suspense and irrefutable logic, [the film] must grip audiences for many seasons." The production company made The Blue Pearl in 1920 based on the play by Anne Crawford Flexner, starring Edith Hallor, Lumsden Hare, Earl Schenck and John Halliday.

== Post-war ==
In 1919, John Golden arranged a meeting with his fellow producers J. Fred Zimmerman Jr., Archibald Selwyn, Florenz Ziegfeld Jr., Winchell Smith and Weber with the goal of cooperating on common issues such as censorship and ticket speculation. He wanted to set up a forum so the producers could share ideas, and wanted stop the rival organizations poaching each other's stars. This led to formation of the Producing Managers' Association, which may have inadvertently shown actors the value of organizing into the Actors' Equity Association.

In 1921, Weber and William B. Friedlander were in partnership to present dramatic, musical and vaudeville attractions at the Longacre Theatre on Broadway. In 1923, Weber was managing the Little Theatre on Broadway. He had leased it from Winthrop Ames in partnership with John Golden and F. Ray Comstock. That year the theater staged Guy Bolton's comedies Polly Preferred and Chicken Feed. Chicken Feed had a successful run, but had to close when Weber moved his Little Jessie James from the Longacre to the Little.

In 1925, Weber went into partnership with Harry Houdini to present a traveling show that featured the magician. The show opened on 31 August 1925 at the Maryland Theater in Baltimore for three nights. It came to New York in December 1925. The show ran for two and a half hours in three acts. The first act featured magic tricks, in the second Houdini performed one of his famous escapes, and the third act gave an exposé of fraudulent techniques used by spirit mediums. Orson Welles said the third act was "riveting, like a perverse sort of revival meeting". After Houdini died in October 1926, Weber was one of the honorary pallbearers at his funeral.

On 23 May 1925, the Darlington Golf and Country Club opened in Mahwah, New Jersey, with Weber named president. After an impressive opening festival, the club soon ran into financial problems and was forced into foreclosure. In March 1934, it was announced that Weber was among the patrons of a concert of the Non-Sectarian Anti-Nazi League to be held at Carnegie Hall. Proceeds were to be used for a drive to boycott German imports.

Weber died in New York City on 22 February 1940. He was aged about 71.

== Work ==
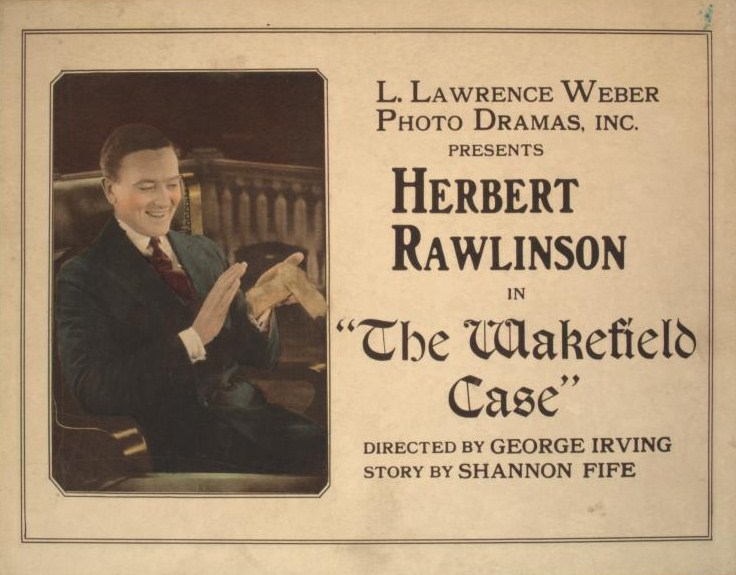
Herbert Rawlinson in The Wakefield Case (1921) (film directed by George Irving)

Weber's stage works included:

- His Little Widows (Musical, Comedy – Producer) Apr 30, 1917 – Jun 30, 1917
- The Very Idea (Play – Producer) Aug 09, 1917 – Aug 1917
- Yes or No (Play – Producer, director) Dec 21, 1917 – Apr 1918
- Nothing But Lies (Play – Producer) Oct 08, 1918 – Feb 1919
- Nobody's Money (Play, Comedy, Farce – Producer) Aug 17, 1921 – Sep 1921
- Cobra (Play, Drama – Producer) Apr 22, 1924 – Jun 1924
- Moonlight (Musical, Comedy – Producer) Jan 30, 1924 – Jun 28, 1924
- Little Jessie James (Musical, Farce, Comedy – Producer, Theater manager) Aug 15, 1923 – Jul 19, 1924
- Mercenary Mary (Musical, Comedy – Producer) Apr 13, 1925 – Aug 08, 1925
- The Sea Woman (Play – Producer) Aug 24, 1925 – Sep 1925
- The Dagger (Play, Melodrama – Producer) Sep 09, 1925 – Sep 1925
- Sour Grapes (Play, Comedy – Theater manager) Sep 06, 1926 – Oct 1926
- Lady Alone (Play – Producer) Jan 20, 1927 – Feb 1927
- The Crown Prince (Play, Romance – Producer) Mar 23, 1927 – May 1927
- Bye, Bye, Bonnie (Musical, Comedy – Producer) Jan 13, 1927 – Apr 30, 1927
- The Command to Love (Play, Comedy – Theater manager) Sep 20, 1927 – Apr 1928
- Romancin' Round (Play, Comedy, Drama – Producer) Oct 03, 1927 – Oct 1927
- The Love Call (Musical – Produced in association with L. Lawrence Weber) Oct 24, 1927 – Jan 07, 1928
- Nice Women (Play, Comedy – Producer) Jun 10, 1929 – Aug 1929
- Her Friend the King (Play, Comedy – Producer) Oct 07, 1929 – Oct 1929
- Diana (Play, Drama – Producer) Dec 09, 1929 – Dec 1929
- Family Affairs (Play, Comedy – Producer) Dec 10, 1929 – Dec 1929
- Ritzy (Play, Comedy – Producer) Feb 10, 1930 – Mar 1930
- Overture (Play, Drama – Theater manager) Dec 05, 1930 – Jan 1931
- She Lived Next to the Firehouse (Play, Farce – Producer) Feb 10, 1931 – Mar 1931
- Napi (Play, Comedy – Producer) Mar 11, 1931 – Mar 1931
- The Man Who Reclaimed His Head (Play, Drama – Producer) Sep 08, 1932 – Oct 1932
- Strip Girl (Play, Comedy – Producer) Oct 19, 1935 – Nov 1935
- The Man Who Killed Lincoln (Play, Drama – Performer) Jan 17, 1940 – Jan 20, 1940
