= Allen Kearns =

- Born: Allen Kearns; 14 August 1894
- Occupations: singer and actor

Allen Kearns (14 August 1894 – 20 April 1956) was a Canadian-born singer and actor. He was born in Brockville, Ontario, Canada and died in Albany, New York. He played the romantic lead role in several Broadway musicals and is especially remembered for introducing two hit songs by George and Ira Gershwin: "'S Wonderful" (from Funny Face, 1927) and "Embraceable You" (from Girl Crazy, 1930).

== Appearances ==
=== On stage ===
- The Red Petticoat (1913)
- Miss Daisy (1914)
- Come Along (1919)
- Tickle Me (1921)
- Tangerine (1921)
- Lady Butterfly (1923)
- Little Jessie James (1923) (*with Miriam Hopkins)
- Mercenary Mary (1925)
- Tip-Toes (1925)
- Betsy (1926)
- Funny Face (1927)
- Here's Howe (1928)
- Hello, Daddy (1928)
- Girl Crazy (1930)
- A Divine Moment (1934)
- The American Way (1939)
- The Odds on Mrs. Oakley (1944)

=== On film ===
- The Very Idea (1929) - Gilbert Goodhue
- Tanned Legs (1929) - Roger Fleming
- Lovin' the Ladies (1930) - Jimmy Farnsworth
