= 1923 in music =

This is a list of notable events in music that took place in the year 1923.

== Specific locations ==
- 1923 in British music
- 1923 in Norwegian music

== Specific genres ==
- 1923 in country music
- 1923 in jazz

== Events ==
- 15 January – Rued Langgaard conducts the premiere of his Symphony No. 6 (later subtitled "The Heaven-rending") in Karlsruhe, performed by the Badisches Landestheater-Orchester.
- February – Joseph Samuels' Tampa Blue Jazz Band records the George Washington Thomas number "The Fives" for Okeh Records, considered the first example of jazz band boogie-woogie.
- February 19 – Jean Sibelius conducts the world première of his Symphony No. 6 in Helsinki.
- May 30 – The British Broadcasting Company's Cardiff station (5WA) broadcasts the first full performance of a new orchestral opera on UK radio.
- October 18 – Igor Stravinsky conducts the premiere of his Octet at the Paris Opera. In the same concert, Serge Prokofiev's First Violin Concerto (1917) is also premiered, with Marcel Darrieux, violin, and the Paris Opera Orchestra conducted by Serge Koussevitzky.
- November 11 – Première of John Foulds's A World Requiem (composed 1919–21) at the Royal Albert Hall in London. It is repeated on that date each year until 1926.
- November 19 – At a concert celebrating the 50th anniversary of the union of Buda and Pest (thus creating Budapest), Béla Bartók's Dance Suite and Zoltán Kodály's Psalmus Hungaricus both receive their world premieres
- Explosion of recordings by African American musicians — Sidney Bechet, Ida Cox, Fletcher Henderson, Jelly Roll Morton, Joe "King" Oliver with Louis Armstrong, Ma Rainey, Bessie Smith, and many others make their first recordings.
- George Enescu makes his debut as a conductor with the Philadelphia Orchestra in New York City.
- Henri Pawl-Pleyel, Roger Désormière, Maxime Jacob and Henri Sauguet form the Ecole d'Arcueil.
- Augustus John completes his portrait of cellist Guilhermina Suggia.
- Japanese composer Michio Miyagi introduces an 80-string koto or "or hachijugen". It proves less popular than the 17-string koto he had invented two years earlier.

== Publications ==
- Stewart Macpherson – Melody and Harmony, Books 2 and 3. London: Stainer & Bell. (Book 1 published 1920.)

== Published popular music ==
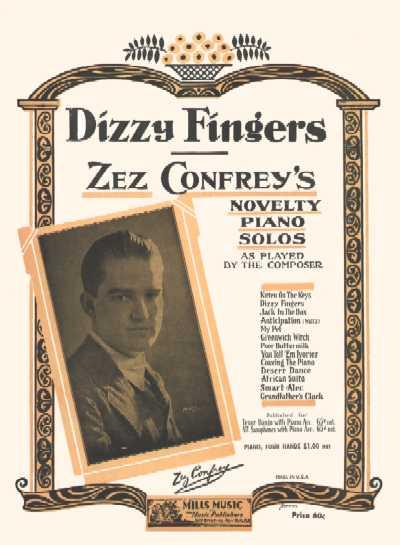
Zez Confrey's "Dizzy Fingers"

- "Annabelle" w. Lew Brown m. Ray Henderson
- "Bambalina" w. Otto Harbach & Oscar Hammerstein II m. Herbert Stothart & Vincent Youmans. Introduced by Edith Day in the musical Wildflower
- "Barney Google" w.m. Billy Rose & Con Conrad
- "Beside A Babbling Brook" w. Gus Kahn m. Walter Donaldson
- "Charleston" w.m. Cecil Mack & James P. Johnson. Inspiration for a dance craze.
- "Chimes Blues" m. Joe "King" Oliver
- "Come On, Spark Plug!" w.m. Billy Rose & Con Conrad
- "Dippermouth Blues" m. Joe "King" Oliver
- "Dizzy Fingers" m. Zez Confrey
- "Frasquita Serenade" m. Franz Lehár
- "Gulf Coast Blues" w.m. Clarence Williams
- "Horsey, Keep Your Tail Up" w.m. Walter Hirsch & Bert Kaplan
- "I Cried For You" w. Arthur Freed m. Gus Arnheim & Abe Lyman
- "I Love Life" w. Irwin M. Cassel m. Mana-Zucca
- "I Love You" w. Harlan Thompson m. Harry Archer. Introduced by John Boles and Margaret Wilson in the musical Little Jessie James
- "I Won't Say I Will But I Won't Say I Won't" w. B. G. De Sylva & Ira Gershwin m. George Gershwin. Introduced by Irene Bordoni in the play Little Miss Bluebeard
- "Indiana Moon" w. Benny Davis m. Isham Jones
- "It Ain't Gonna Rain No Mo'" w.m. Wendell Hall
- "I've Got The Yes! We Have No Bananas Blues" w. Lew Brown m. James F. Hanley & Robert King
- "Just A Girl That Men Forget" w. Al Dubin & Fred Rath m. Joe Garron
- "King Porter Stomp" m. Ferdinand "Jelly Roll" Morton
- "Last Night On The Back Porch" w. Lew Brown m. Carl Schraubstader
- "Louisville Lou" w. Jack Yellen m. Milton Ager
- "Mama Goes Where Papa Goes" w. Jack Yellen m. Milton Ager
- "Mama Loves Papa" w.m. Cliff Friend & Abel Baer
- "March Of The Cameron Men" w.m. Campbell
- "Mexicali Rose" w. Helen Stone m. Jack B. Tenney
- "Milenberg Joys" m. Leon Rappolo, Paul Mares & Jelly Roll Morton
- "Mon Paradis (Sérénade d'Aujourd'hui)" m. Cuthbert Clarke
- "Moon Love" w. George Grossmith Jr. & P. G. Wodehouse m. Jerome Kern
- "Nashville Nightingale" w. Irving Caesar m. George Gershwin
- "No, No, Nora" w. Gus Kahn m. Ted Fio Rito & Ernie Erdman
- "Nobles of the Mystic Shrine" John Philip Sousa
- "Nobody Knows You When You're Down and Out" w.m. Jimmy Cox
- "Oh Gee Oh Gosh Oh Golly I'm In Love" w. Ole Olsen & Chic Johnson m. Ernest Breuer
- "Oklahoma Indian Jazz" (w. & m.) Ray Hibbler, T.J. Johnsen, J.W. Barna, J.W. Murrin, and T. Guarini
- "Old Fashioned Love" w. Cecil Mack m. James P. Johnson
- "Old King Tut" w. William Jerome m. Harry Von Tilzer
- "On The Mall" m. Edwin Franko Goldman
- "Once In A Blue Moon" w. Anne Caldwell m. Jerome Kern
- "An Orange Grove In California" w.m. Irving Berlin
- "Raggedy Ann" w. Anne Caldwell m. Jerome Kern
- "Rememb'ring" w.m. Vivian Duncan & Rosetta Duncan
- "La Rosita" w. Allan Stuart m. Paul Dupont (Pseud. of Walter Haenschen)
- "Seven Or Eleven" w. Lew Brown m. Walter Donaldson
- "Sittin' In A Corner" w. Gus Kahn m. George W. Meyer
- "Sleep" w.m. Earl Lebieg
- "A Smile Will Go A Long Long Way" w. Benny Davis m. Harry Akst
- "Snake Rag" m. King Oliver
- "Some Sweet Day" w. Gene Buck m. Dave Stamper & Louis A. Hirsch
- "Stella" w.m. Al Jolson, Benny Davis & Harry Akst
- "Swingin' Down the Lane" w. Gus Kahn m. Isham Jones
- "Tell Me With A Melody" w.m. Irving Berlin
- "That Old Gang of Mine" w. Billy Rose & Mort Dixon m. Ray Henderson
- "Tin Roof Blues" m. Paul Mares, Walter Melrose, Ben Pollack, Mel Stitzel, George Brunies & Leon Roppolo
- "When It's Night-Time In Italy, It's Wednesday Over Here" w.m. James Kendis & Lew Brown
- "When June Comes Along With A Song" w.m. George M. Cohan from the musical The Rise Of Rosie O'Reilly
- "When You Walked Out Someone Else Walked Right In" w.m. Irving Berlin
- "Who's Sorry Now?" w. Bert Kalmar & Harry Ruby m. Ted Snyder
- "Wild Flower" w. Otto Harbach & Oscar Hammerstein II m. Vincent Youmans & Herbert Stothart
- "Wolverine Blues" w.m. Ferdinand "Jelly Roll" Morton, Benjamin Spikes & John C. Spikes
- "Yes! We Have No Bananas" w.m. Frank Silver & Irving Cohn
- "You've Got To See Mama Ev'ry Night" w.m. Con Conrad & Billy Rose

== Top popular recordings of 1923 ==
The following songs achieved the highest positions in Joel Whitburn's Pop Memories 1890-1954 and record sales reported on the "Discography of American Historical Recordings" website during 1923. Numerical rankings are approximate; they are only used as a frame of reference.

Rank	Artist	Title	Label	Recorded	Released	Chart Positions
1	Paul Whiteman and His Orchestra	"Parade of the Wooden Soldiers"	Victor 19007	October 21, 1921	April 7, 1923	US Billboard 1923 No. 1, US No. 1 for 7 weeks, 13 total weeks, 722,895 sold (Victor 1920s memo)
2	Isham Jones Orchestra	"Swingin' Down the Lane"	Brunswick 2438	May 4, 1923	July 1923	US Billboard 1923 No. 2, US No. 1 for 6 weeks, 15 total weeks
3	Billy Murray & Ed Smalle	"That Old Gang of Mine"	Victor 19095	June 5, 1923	September 1923	US Billboard 1922 No. 3, US No. 1 for 6 weeks, 14 total weeks
4	Billy Jones	"Yes! We Have No Bananas"	Edison 51183	June 8, 1923	July 1923	US Billboard 1923 No. 4, US No. 1 for 5 weeks, 13 total weeks
5	Bessie Smith	"Down Hearted Blues"	Columbia 3844	February 16, 1923	May 1923	US Billboard 1923 No. 5, US No. 1 for 4 weeks, 12 total weeks, 1,000,000 sold
6	Al Jolson	"Toot, Toot, Tootsie (Goo' Bye!)"	Columbia 3705	September 11, 1922	December 1922	US Billboard 1922 No. 6, US No. 1 for 4 weeks, 10 total weeks
7	Van and Schenck	"Carolina in the Morning"	Columbia 3712	September 18, 1922	December 1922	US Billboard 1922 No. 7, US No. 1 for 3 weeks, 14 total weeks
8	Carl Fenton and His Orchestra	"Love Sends a Little Gift of Roses"	Brunswick 2392	January 15, 1923	March 1923	US Billboard 1923 No. 8, US No. 1 for 3 weeks, 10 total weeks
9	Art Landry & His Orchestra	"Dreamy Melody"	Gennett 5255	February 12, 1923	May 1923	US Billboard 1923 No. 9, US No. 1 for 3 weeks, 10 total weeks, 1,500,000 sales
10	Ben Selvin's Dance Orchestra	"Yes! We Have No Bananas"	Vocalion 14590	May 15, 1923	August 1923	US Billboard 1923 No. 10, US No. 1 for 2 weeks, 12 total weeks
11	Eddie Cantor	"No, No, Nora"	Columbia 3964	July 26, 1923	October 1923	US Billboard 1923 No. 11, US No. 1 for 2 weeks, 9 total weeks
12	Paul Whiteman and His Orchestra	"I'll Build a Stairway to Paradise"	Victor 18949	September 1, 1922	November 22, 1922	US Billboard 1923 No. 12, US No. 1 for 1 weeks, 9 total weeks
13	Paul Whiteman and His Orchestra	"Bambalina"	Victor 19035	September 1, 1922	June 22, 1923	US Billboard 1923 No. 13, US No. 1 for 1 weeks, 8 total weeks
14	Paul Whiteman and His Orchestra	"Crinoline Days"	Victor 18983	February 20, 1923	March 17, 1923	US Billboard 1923 No. 14, US No. 2 for 3 weeks, 9 total weeks
15	Eddie Cantor	"I've Got the Yes! We Have No Bananas Blues"	Columbia 3964	July 26, 1923	October 1923	US Billboard 1923 No. 15, US No. 2 for 3 weeks, 6 total weeks
22	Isham Jones Orchestra	"Who's Sorry Now"	Brunswick 2438	May 4, 1923	July 1923	US Billboard 1923 No. 22, US No. 3 for 1 weeks, 8 total weeks
25	Great White Way Orchestra (vocal Billy Murray)	"Yes! We have No Bananas"	Victor 19068	April 26, 1923	July 1923	US Billboard 1923 No. 25, US No. 3 for 1 weeks, 6 total weeks, 610,101 sales (Victor 1920s memo)
28	Paul Whiteman and His Orchestra	"Wonderful One"	Victor 19019	January 25, 1923	April 1923	US Billboard 1923 No. 28, US No. 3 for 1 weeks, 5 total weeks, 800,005 sold (Victor 1920s memo)

== Other important recordings ==
- "Dippermouth Blues" by King Oliver's Creole Jazz Band
- "High Society" by King Oliver's Creole Jazz Band
- "Milenburg Joys" by the New Orleans Rhythm Kings with Jelly Roll Morton
- "Wild Cat Blues/Kansas City Man Blues" by Clarence Williams Blue 5, featuring Sidney Bechet

== Classical music ==
- Béla Bartók – Dance Suite
- Ferruccio Busoni – Prélude et étude en arpèges, BV 297
- Henry Cowell – Aeolian Harp
- Frederick Delius – Hassan, RT I/9, incidental music for play premiering June 1 in Darmstadt
- Gerald Finzi – A Severn Rhapsody
- Gabriel Fauré – Piano Trio in D minor, Op. 120
- Josef Matthias Hauer – Atonale Musik, Op.20
- Paul Hindemith – String Quartet No.5, Op.32, premiered October 26 in Vienna
- Jenö Hubay – 5 Konzertetüden, Op.115
- Joseph Jongen – 3 Études de concert, Op.65
- Sigfrid Karg-Elert
  - Cathedral Windows, Op.106
  - 3 Compositions for Organ, Op.108
- Darius Milhaud – La création du monde (ballet)
- Hans Pfitzner – Concerto for Violin in B minor
- Arnold Schoenberg
  - Fünf Stücke [Five Pieces] for Piano, Op. 23 (1920/1923)
  - Serenade, Op. 24 (1920/1923)
  - Suite for Piano, Op. 25 (1921/1923)
- Jean Sibelius – Symphony No. 6 was premiered by the Helsinki Philharmonic Orchestra, conducted by the composer, on 19 February 1923
- Igor Stravinsky – Octet for Wind Instruments
- Germaine Tailleferre – Ballade for Piano and Orchestra; Concerto No. 1 for Piano and Orchestra
- Joaquín Turina – Jardin de Oriente
- Edgard Varèse
  - Hyperprism (1922–23)
  - Octandre
- Heitor Villa-Lobos – Nonet ("Impressão rápida de todo o Brasil")
- William Walton – Toccata for Violin and Piano
- Leó Weiner – Concertino for Piano and Orchestra
- Eugène Ysaÿe - Violin Sonata No. 3 Ballade
- Alexander von Zemlinsky – Lyric Symphony

== Opera ==
- Alfred Bruneau – Le Jardin du paradis
- Hans Gál – Die heilige Ente
- Reynaldo Hahn – Ciboulette
- Joaquín Turina – Jardin de Oriente

== Musical theater ==
- The Beauty Prize (Music: Jerome Kern; Lyrics and Book: P. G. Wodehouse and George Grossmith). London production opened at the Winter Garden Theatre on September 5 and ran for 214 performances
- Catherine London production opened at the Gaiety Theatre on September 22 and ran for 217 performances
- Cinders (Music: Rudolf Friml; Lyrics and Book: Edward Clark). Broadway production opened at the Dresden Theatre on April 3 and ran for 31 performances.
- The Cousin from Nowhere London production opened at Prince's Theatre on February 24 and ran for 105 performances
- Dover Street to Dixie London revue opened at the Pavilion on May 31 and ran for 108 performances
- George White's Scandals of 1923 Broadway revue opened at the Globe Theatre on June 18 and transferred to the Fulton Theatre on November 5 for a total run of 168 performances
- Head over Heels London production opened at the Adelphi Theatre on September 8 and ran for 113 performances
- Katinka London production opened at the Shaftesbury Theatre on August 30 and ran for 108 performances
- Kid Boots Broadway production opened at the Earl Carroll Theatre on December 31 and transferred to the Selwyn Theatre on September 1, 1924 for a total run of 489 performances
- Little Nellie Kelly London production opened at the New Oxford Theatre on July 2 and ran for 265 performances
- London Calling! London revue opened at the Duke of York's Theatre on September 4 and ran for 367 performances
- Madame Pompadour
  - Vienna production opened at the Carltheater on March 2
  - London production opened at Daly's Theatre on December 20 and ran for 467 performances
- The Music Box Revue London revue opened at the Palace Theatre on May 15 and ran for 217 performances
- The Rainbow London production opened at the Empire Theatre on April 3 and ran for 113 performances
- Rats London revue opened at the Vaudeville Theatre on February 4 and ran for 285 performances
- The Rise of Rosie O'Reilly Broadway production opened at the Liberty Theatre on December 25 and ran for 97 performances
- "Runnin' Wild', Broadway musical with music by James P. Johnson and Cecil Mack opened October 29 and ran at the new Colonial Theatre for 228 performances. Spearheaded the Charleston dance craze.
- Stop Flirting London production opened at the Shaftesbury Theatre on May 30 and ran for 418 performances
- Wildflower Broadway production opened at the Casino Theatre on February 7 and ran for 477 performances
- The Jilts by Philip Barry, won the Herndon Prize in 1922 as the best drama. Renamed You and I, the play opened on Broadway on February 19, 1923,
- You'd Be Surprised London production opened at the Royal Opera House on January 27 and ran for 270 performances
- Ziegfeld Follies of 1923 Broadway revue opened at the New Amsterdam Theatre on October 20 and ran for 233 performances

== Births ==
- January 1 – Milt Jackson, jazz vibraphonist (d. 1999)
- January 4
  - Don Butterfield, classical and jazz tuba player (d. 2006)
  - Tito Rodríguez, Puerto Rican-American singer-songwriter and television host (d. 1973)
  - Flavio Testi, Italian composer and musicologist (d. 2014)
- January 5 – Sam Phillips, record producer (d. 2003)
- January 25 – Rusty Draper, American singer-songwriter (d. 2003)
- February 2 – Julius Hegyi, American conductor and violinist (d. 2007)
- February 5 – Claude King, country singer and songwriter (d. 2013)
- March 2 – Doc Watson, American guitarist, singer and songwriter (d. 2012)
- March 6 – Wes Montgomery, American guitarist (d. 1968)
- March 12 – Norbert Brainin, Austrian-born British violinist (d. 2005)
- March 26 – Clifton Williams, American composer (d. 1976)
- April 1 – Jean Catoire, French classical composer (d. 2005)
- April 25 – Albert King, American blues guitarist and singer (d. 1992)
- April 29 – Walter Deutsch, Austrian musicologist (d. 2025)
- May 15 – John Lanchbery, composer and conductor (d. 2003)
- May 17 – Peter Mennin, American composer and administrator (d. 1983)
- May 28 – György Ligeti, composer (d. 2006)
- May 29 – Eugene Wright, american jazzist (d. 2020)
- June 8 – Karel Goeyvaerts, Belgian composer (d. 1993)
- June 29 – Ronnie Ronalde, born Ronald Waldron, English yodeller and siffleur (d. 2015)
- July 7 – Alena Veselá, Czech organist and music teacher (d. 2025)
- July 15 – Philly Joe Jones, American drummer (d. 1985)
- July 22 – Mukesh, Indian playback singer (d. 1976)
- July 31 – Ahmet Ertegun, Turkish-American record industry executive (d. 2006)
- August 4 – Arthur Butterworth, English composer (d. 2014)
- August 11 – June Hutton, singer (d. 1973)
- September 15 – Anton Heiller, Austrian organist, harpsichordist, composer, conductor (d. 1979)
- September 17 – Hank Williams, country musician (d. 1953)
- October 3 – Stanisław Skrowaczewski, orchestral conductor (d. 2017)
- October 5 – Glynis Johns, actress and singer (d. 2024)
- October 16 – Bert Kaempfert, songwriter and orchestra leader (d. 1980)
- October 20 – Robert Craft, conductor and music writer (d. 2015)
- October 23 – Ned Rorem, composer and writer (d. 2022)
- October 27 – Mario Duschenes, Canadian composer (d. 2009)
- November 1 –
  - Antonia Apodaca, New Mexican folk musician and composer (d. 2020)
  - Victoria de los Ángeles, Catalan-Spanish lyric soprano (d. 2005)
- November 2 – Pearl Carr, singer (d. 2020)
- November 10 – Anne Shelton, singer (d. 1994)
- November 24 – Serge Chaloff, American jazz baritone saxophonist (d. 1957)
- December 2 – Maria Callas, American-born Greek operatic soprano (d. 1977)
- December 16 – Menahem Pressler, German-born Israeli pianist (d. 2023)

== Deaths ==
- January 5 – Emanuel Wirth, violinist (b. 1842)
- January 10 – Patsy Touhey, Irish-American piper (b. 1865)
- January 18 – Kate Santley, actress and singer (b. 1837)
- January 25 – Alfons Petzold, Austrian lyricist (b. 1882)
- February 2 – Vassily Brandt, trumpeter, music educator and composer (b. 1869)
- February 19
  - Gerónimo Giménez, Spanish composer (b. 1854)
  - Josef Pembaur, American composer (b. 1848)
- February 22 – B. Merrill Hopkinson, baritone and dentist (b. 1859)
- February 27 – Léon Roques, translator (b. 1839)
- March 5 – Dora Pejačević, composer (puerperal sepsis) (b. 1885)
- March 8 – Krišjānis Barons, collector of Latvian folk songs (b. 1835)
- March 16 – August Göllerich, Austrian conductor (born 1859)
- March 20 – Henry Edward Krehbiel, musicologist (b. 1854)
- April 17 – Anthony J. Stastny, composer and music publisher (b. 1885)
- May 7 – Sadie Martinot, actress and soprano singer (b. 1861)
- May 30 – Camille Chevillard, composer
- June 11 – Julia Ettie Crane, music educator (b. 1855)
- June 20
  - Joseph Leopold Röckel, composer (born 1838)
  - Charitie Lees Smith, hymn-writer (b. 1841)
- June 30 – Claude Terrasse, composer of operettas (b. 1867)
- July 10 – Albert Chevalier, English actor, singer-songwriter and music hall performer (b. 1861)
- July 13 – Asger Hamerik, composer (b. 1843)
- August 15 – Vali von der Osten, operatic soprano (b. 1882)
- August 31 – Ernest van Dyck, operatic tenor (b. 1861)
- October 11 – Wilhelm Karczag, theater director (born 1857)
- October 12 – John Cadvan Davies, poet and hymn-writer (b. 1846)
- October 14 – George Whiting, composer (born 1840)
- October 22 – Victor Maurel, operatic baritone (b. 1848)
- October 28 – Theodor Reuss, music hall singer and polymath (b. 1855)
- December 2 – Tomás Bretón, composer (b. 1850)
- December 7 – Vess Ossman, banjoist (b. 1868)
- December 8 – Joseph Pothier, abbot and musicologist, reviver of the Gregorian chant (b. 1835)
- December 19 – Gustav Dannreuther, violinist and conductor (b. 1853)
- date unknown – Charles Jean Baptiste Collin-Mezin, violin-maker (b. 1841)
