= Rhapsodies (album) =

Album by Rick Wakeman

Studio album by Rick Wakeman
- Released: May 1979
- Recorded: 1978–1979
- Studio: La Grange using the A&M Mobile and Mountain, Montreux, Switzerland
- Genre: Progressive rock
- Length: 70:17
- Label: A&M (SP-6501)
- Producer: Tony Visconti

Rick Wakeman chronology
Rick Wakeman's Criminal Record (1977)	Rhapsodies (1979)	The Burning (1981)

Singles from Rhapsodies
- 1. "Animal Showdown" Released: June 1979; 2. "Swan Lager" Released: November 1979

Rhapsodies is a studio double album by English keyboardist Rick Wakeman, released in May 1979 on A&M Records. It was his last studio release on A&M and reached no. 25 in the UK. Described by Wakeman as "probably the most confusing I have ever made" due to the range of styles, it contains generally shorter tracks than his previous work to date, the longest being 5:32. All of his previous non-soundtrack albums had contained at least two tracks over seven minutes long.

== Critical reception ==
Professional ratings
Review scores
Source	Rating
AllMusic	4.5/5 stars
Record Mirror	4/5 stars
Smash Hits	4/10

The Globe and Mail wrote that Wakeman's "major problem is his insistence on inundating the marketplace with far more instrumentally adept but generally unexciting mishmash than it can possibly absorb."

== Track listing ==
All tracks by Rick Wakeman, except where noted.

Side one
No.	Title	Writer(s)	Length
1.	"Pedra da Gavea"		4:11
2.	"Front Line"		3:42
3.	"Bombay Duck"		3:14
4.	"Animal Showdown (Yes We Have No Bananas)"	Wakeman, Frank Silver, Irving Cohn	2:40
5.	"Big Ben"		3:48

Side two
No.	Title	Writer(s)	Length
6.	"Rhapsody in Blue"	George Gershwin; arranged by Tony Visconti	5:26
7.	"Wooly Willy Tango"		3:24
8.	"The Pulse"		5:21
9.	"Swan Lager"	music taken from Tchaikovsky's "Swan Lake" and Edvard Grieg's Piano Concerto in A minor; arranged and adapted by Rick Wakeman	2:50

Side three
No.	Title	Length
10.	"March of the Gladiators"	4:53
11.	"Flacons de Neige"	5:01
12.	"The Flasher"	5:32
13.	"The Palais"	2:23

Side four
No.	Title	Writer(s)	Length
14.	"Stand-By"		3:30
15.	"Sea Horses"		3:52
16.	"Half Holiday"		3:00
17.	"Summertime"	George Gershwin, DuBose Heyward; arranged by Rick Wakeman	4:27
18.	"Credits"		2:39

== Personnel ==
Music

- Rick Wakeman – keyboards, arrangements, vocals and vocoder on "Pedra da Gavea"
- Nico Ramsden – electric guitar
- Tony Visconti – acoustic guitar, engineer
- Bruce Lynch – bass guitars
- Frank Gibson Jr. – drums, percussion

Technical

- James Lougheed – engineer, Mobile One tape operator
- David K. Richards – assistant engineer
- Michael Ross – album design, art direction
- Paul Wakefield – photography

== Charts ==
Chart (1979)	Peak position
Norwegian Albums (VG-lista)	15
Swedish Albums (Sverigetopplistan)	43
UK Albums (OCC)	25
US Billboard 200	170
