= B. Merrill Hopkinson =

American dentist and musician (1858–1923)

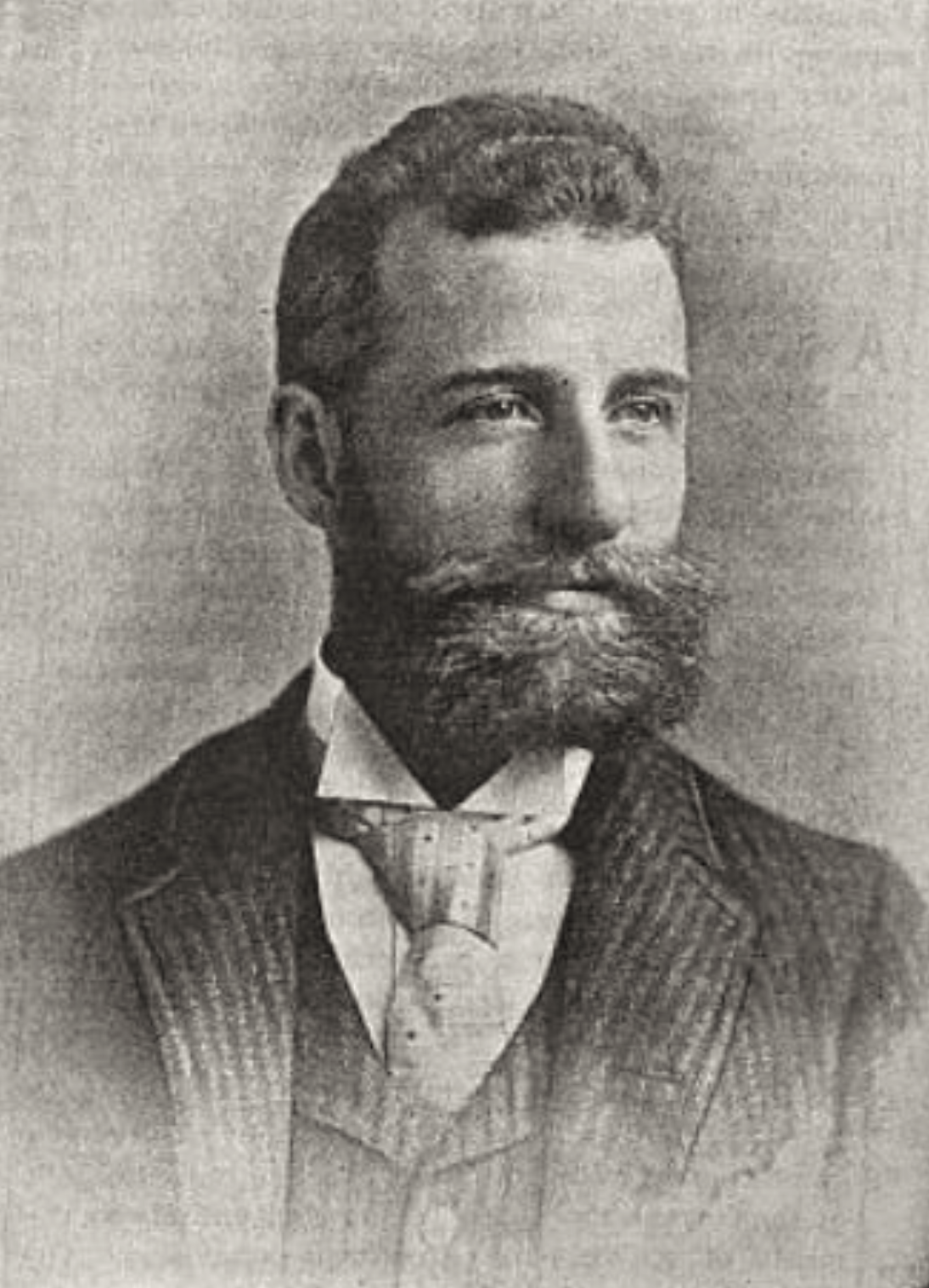
B. Merrill Hopkinson in 1890

Benjamin Merrill Hopkinson (September 18, 1858 – February 22, 1923) was an American dentist, medical doctor, oral surgeon, academic, civil servant, baritone, church musician, and choir director.

Born and raised in Baltimore, Hopkinson went to Boston as a teenager to work in business while simultaneously studying music. His father, a dentist, suffered an accident and he returned home to Baltimore to aid in him in his dental practice. After graduating from the Baltimore College of Dental Surgery and University of Maryland School of Medicine, he became a leading dentist in Maryland, ultimately serving as a chaired professor in the University of Maryland School of Dentistry from 1911 until his death twelve years later. In addition to operating a private dental practice, he also was the longtime director of the dental clinics program for Baltimore Public Schools system and later the Baltimore City Health Department. He contributed articles to several dental journals.

In addition to his career in medicine, Hopkinson had a parallel career as a concert baritone and church musician. He was employed as a singer and choral director at various churches and synagogues in Baltimore from the 1880s up until his death in 1923. He performed often in both amateur and professional concerts in Baltimore, and worked professionally as a singer on the national stage as a recitalist and oratorio singer. His concert work included performances with the Oratorio Society of Baltimore, the Boston Symphony Orchestra, and the orchestra of the Metropolitan Opera among other ensembles. A talented amateur pole vaulter, he was a leader in amateur sports organizations both locally and nationally, including serving on the United States Olympic Committee.

== Early life and education ==
The son of Dr. Moses Atwood Hopkinson and Elizabeth Ann Hopkinson, Benjamin Merrill R. Hopkinson was born in Baltimore, Maryland, on September 18, 1858. He began his professional life as a teenager working in business in Boston during which time he also studied music in that city. When his father, a dentist, suffered an accident, he returned to Baltimore and pursued training in his father's profession in order to held aid in the family practice. He graduated with a D.D.S. from the Baltimore College of Dental Surgery in 1880 and later earned an M.D. from the University of Maryland School of Medicine (UMSM) in 1885.

== Medical practitioner and academic ==
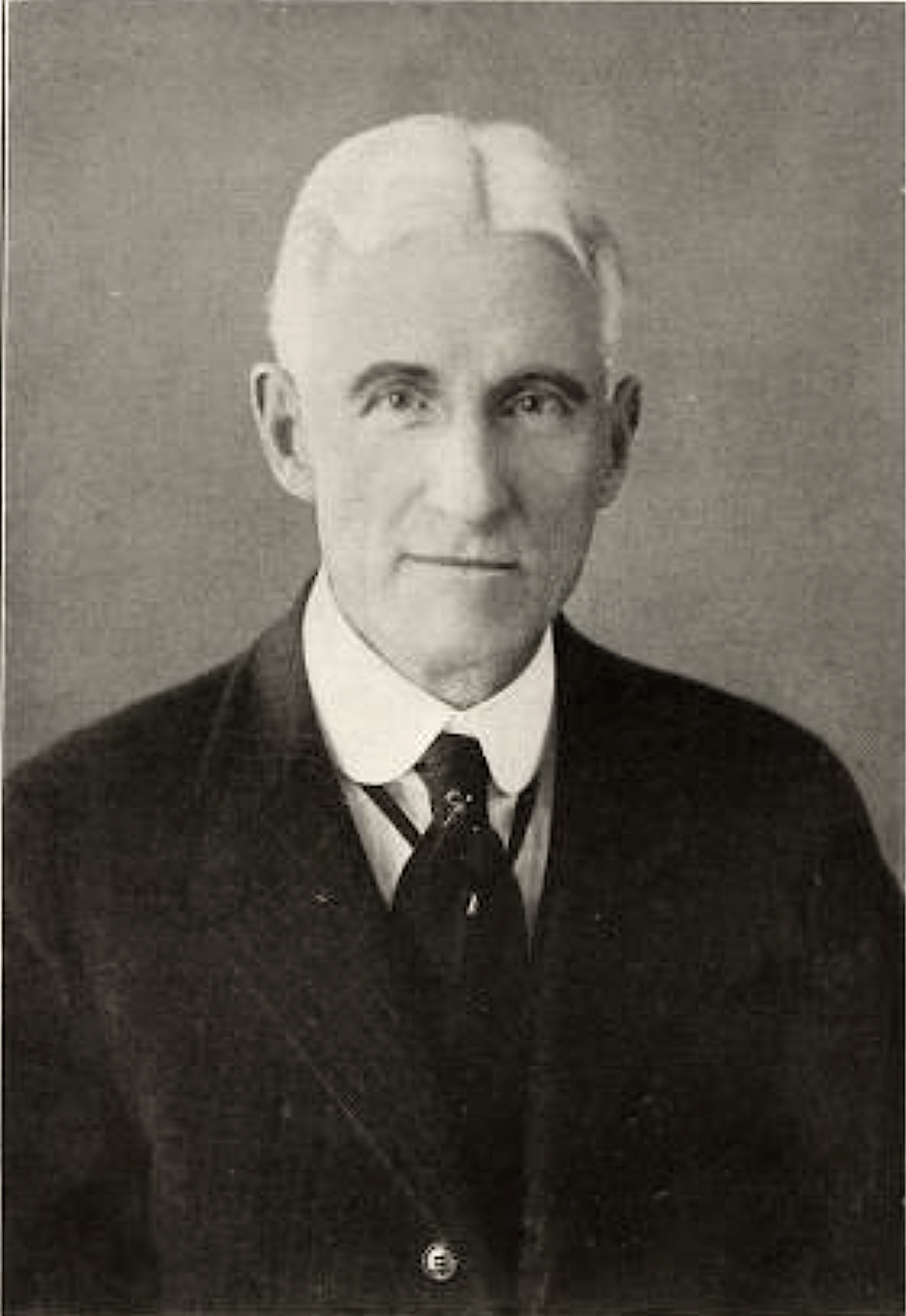
B. Merrill Hopkinson

Hopkinson was considered a leading dentist in Maryland and was an expert in oral surgery. By 1879 he had joined his father's dental practice in downtown Baltimore which had been founded 30 years earlier in 1849. The Hopkinson family practice was located at the intersection of Charles and Saratoga Streets and B. Merrill continued to practice there until those dental offices were demolished to make room the Colonial Trust Company Building (built 1907). He later had a practice as a physician at The Cecil Apartments on Charles St.

By 1882 he was an assistant lecturer at the University of Maryland School of Dentistry (UMSD). He was appointed the first secretary of the Maryland State Dental Association when it was chartered on October 18, 1883. In 1884 he was elected Maryland's delegate to the National Dental Association (NDA) and was appointed to the committee overseeing membership for the NDA. In 1889 he was elected a member of the Medical and Chirurgical Faculty of the State of Maryland.

In 1911 Hopkinson was made a chaired professor at the UMSD, holding the post of Professor of Oral Hygiene and Dental History. He remained in that position for the remainder of his life. He simultaneously was involved in an effort to improve the dental health of children in Baltimore, serving as the director of the Baltimore Public Schools Dental Health Clinics from 1912 to 1922. He remained director when that program was reorganized under the Baltimore City Health Department in 1922, serving in that position until his death the following year. He also served on the governing board of the UMSD.

Hopkinson's academic work and musical work sometimes came together. In 1893 he sang a song he wrote, "Our Graduates", at the commencement ceremony of the UMSM. When the University of Maryland Libraries (UML) was gifted the General Lafayette Memorial Flag by the Daughters of the American Revolution, Hopkinson sang both France's national anthem ("La Marseillaise") and America's national anthem ("The Star-Spangled Banner") at a special ceremony in 1917 in which the flag was officially bequeathed to the UML. He contributed articles to The American Journal of Dental Science among several other dental journals.

== Musician ==
Hopkinson was a prominent musician in the city of Baltimore. A talented baritone, he held staff music posts at various churches in Baltimore, among them Brown Memorial Presbyterian Church (BMPC), St. Michael's Church Complex, and All Angels Episcopal Church. He was the longtime precentor at BMPC, and was also the choir director at both the Baltimore Hebrew Congregation Synagogue (also known as Madison Avenue Temple) and Eutaw Street Methodist Episcopal Church at varying periods. At the time of his death in 1923 he was a member of the choir at Eutaw Place Temple.

In 1883 Hopkinson performed in a concert with soprano Mamie Kunkel. He performed frequently as a guest soloist in sacred music concerts with the Oratorio Society of Baltimore and at various churches throughout the city. With the OSB he was a soloist in Handel's Israel in Egypt (1882), Engelbert Humperdinck's Die Wallfahrt nach Kevlaar (1889), and Camille Saint-Saëns's Coeli enarrant, Op. 42 (1849) among other works.

Hopkinson also performed with some frequency in concerts at the Baltimore Academy of Music (BMA) and Ford's Grand Opera House. He was a guest soloist with Ross Jungnickel's Baltimore Orchestra (no relation to the present orchestra which was founded later) at the BMA in February 1890. The following October he performed in concert with soprano Marion Weed at the BMA. In 1894 he performed excerpts from Lucia di Lammermoor with the Arion Gesangverein at the concert hall of the Germania Männerchor. In March 1898 he gave a recital of new music composed entirely by Ethelbert Nevin at Lehmann's Hall. He was a soloist with Jungnickel and his orchestra again in April 1899, this time at Baltimore Music Hall.

Local composer and minister Maltbie Davenport Babcock composed two sacred solos specifically for Hopkinson, one in and 1894 and the other in 1898. One of these was a setting of Isaac Watts's text "Salvation". Another Baltimore composer, music critic W. G. Owst, composed his song "What is Love?" (published 1899) for Hopkinson.

Hopkinson was also well known on the concert stage nationally. According to The Baltimore Sun he performed in concert tours which took him to nearly every major city east of Chicago. On April 29, 1895, he performed the role of the High Priest of Dagon in Camille Saint-Saëns's Samson and Delilah at Metzerott Music Hall in Washington D.C. with the orchestra of the Metropolitan Opera. His fellow soloists included Mary Louise Clary as Delilah, Albert Guille as Samson and Emil Fischer as Abimélech. In 1889 he was a soloist in several oratorios performed with the Boston Symphony Orchestra at the Worcester Music Festival, Massachusetts, among them Haydn's The Creation. In 1898 he performed a joint recital with contralto Gertrude May Stein under the auspices of the Atlanta Concert Organization. He also toured nationally as a recitalist in the late 19th and early 20th centuries.

== Other activities and death ==
Hopkinson was a talented amateur pole vaulter who served as the president of the Baltimore Athletic Club for a number of years. He was a member of the United States Olympic Committee and was involved in the process of selecting American athletes for the Olympics. He was also elected vice president of the Atlantic Athletic Association, and in 1902 was a member of the National Championship Committee of the Amateur Athletic Union. He was also a masonic lodge officer with the title of Grand Director of Ceremonies.

Hopkinson died at his home at 3925 Cloverhill Rd in Roland Park, Baltimore, on February 22, 1923.
