= Make It Snappy =

1922 musical revue

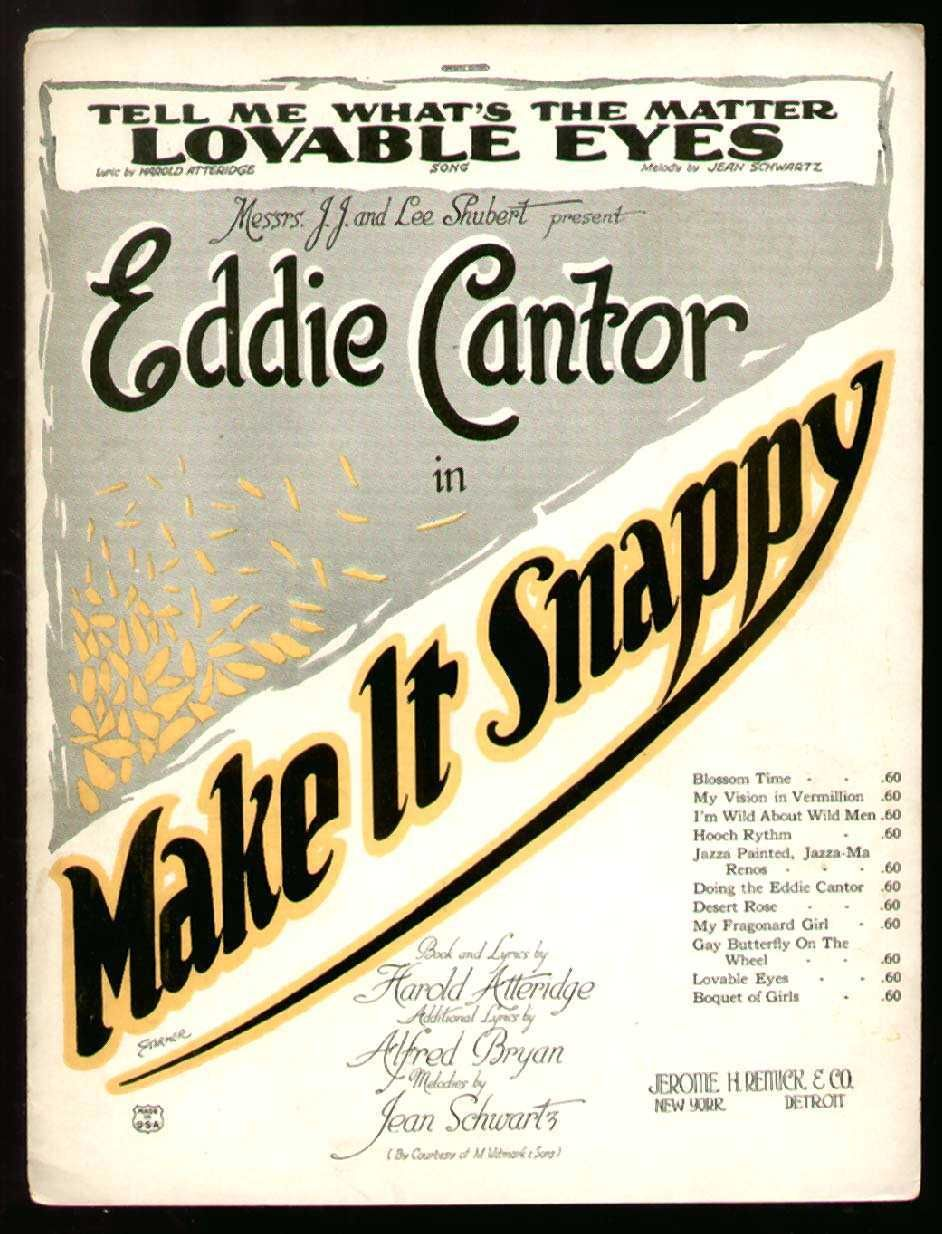
- Cover of sheet music for the songs from the show
- Original language: English
- Genre: Musical revue

Premiere
- Date premiered: 13 March 1922
- Place premiered: Winter Garden Theatre, Broadway, Manhattan, New York, USA

Make It Snappy was a musical revue that ran for 96 performances at the Winter Garden Theatre in the 1922–23 Broadway season. It ran from 13 April to 1 July 1922. It starred Eddie Cantor, who introduced the hit songs "Yes! We Have No Bananas" and "The Sheik of Araby".

== Production ==
Harold R. Atteridge and Eddie Cantor wrote the book. Harold Atteridge wrote the lyrics to music by Jean Schwartz. Alfred Bryan and William B. Friedlander wrote additional lyrics, and Friedlander wrote additional music. The show was produced by The Winter Garden Company, with production supervised by Jacob J. Shubert and staged by Jesse C. Huffman. (Note: Jesse C. Huffman was an extremely prolific director, particularly of light musical comedies and operettas, who since 1911 had been general director of the Shubert Brothers New York productions.) Louis Gress was musical director. Dell Lampe orchestrated the music and Allan K. Foster staged the musical numbers.

The show ran at the Winter Garden from 13 April 1922 to 1 July 1922. Eddie Cantor headlined with Nan Halperin, J. Harold Murray and Lew Hearn. Shubert sent the show on tour after it had closed on Broadway. In Philadelphia, in the last week of the tour, Cantor introduced the song Yes! We Have No Bananas, written by Frank Silver and Irving Cohn. The song, later recorded by Cantor for the Victor Talking Machine Company, became the most popular novelty hit of the 1920s.

== Synopsis ==
The show has been described as a "collation of froth". Some material was reused from an earlier Shubert show The Midnight Rounders. Eddie Cantor played a classic comedy sketch of "Max, the Tailor", a small man having to deal with an unreasonable customer who wanted a belt in the back – and in the end got a different type of belt from the one he expected. Cantor did other sketches as a taxi driver and a very timid police academy candidate. Cantor premiered the song The Sheik of Araby, lyrics by Harry B. Smith and Francis Wheeler, music by Ted Snyder. This also became a major hit.

The Eight Blue Devils put on a tumbling act. Act 2 opened with "Princess Beautiful (A Cleveland Bronner Ballet)". Ballet had been expected in all shows in the 1916–17 season, but by 1922 they were considered outdated. The show included various chorus spectacles. In one the women were all costumed as pink roses. Chorus members used the runway to toss ice cream bricks to the audience in the orchestra seats.

== Reception ==
The revue had a respectable run. It closed in July, as even the most popular New York shows did in the days before air conditioning. The New York Sun said of Cantor's performance that "Al Jolson now has a rival". Both Robert Benchley, writing in Life, and Dorothy Parker, writing in Ainslee's, claimed that Make It Snappy prompted a significant improvement in their opinions of Cantor as an entertainer.

== Cast ==
The full cast was:

- Eddie Cantor
- Nan Halperin
- Salayman Ali
- M. T. Bohannon
- Cleveland Bronner
- Lew Browne
- Marie Burke
- John Byam
- Evelyn Campbell
- Carlos and Inez
- Nell Carrington
- Helen Christie
- Molly Christie
- Harry Cressey
- Betty Dair
- Muriel De Forest
- Alfred DeLoraine
- Rose Devere
- Mae Devereaux
- The Eight Blue Devils
- Flo Evers
- Betty Fitch
- Lillian Fitzgerald
- Elsie Frank
- Eva Fuller
- Dolly Hackett
- Georgie Hale
- Lew Hearn
- Lebanon Hoffa
- Portland Hoffa
- Hermose Jose
- Marian Joy
- Grace Langdon
- Mildred Lee
- Madeline Levine
- Sally Long
- Polly Lux
- Betty Marshall
- Evelyn Martin
- Elsie May
- Polly Mayer
- Dorothy McCarthy
- Margaret McCarthy
- Peggy Mermont
- Gladys Montgomery
- J. Harold Murray
- Vivien Nolty
- Bonna O'Dear
- May O'Brien
- Joe Opp
- Betty Palmer
- Cardinal Peaires
- Elsa Peterson
- Nan Phillips
- Chonchita Piquer
- Lucille Pryor
- Tot Qualters
- Queene Queenen
- Charlotte Schuette
- Ingrid Solfeng
- May Sullivan
- Margaret Toomay
- Marjorie Toomay
- Alice Van Ryker
- Alice Weaver
- Teddy Webb
- Vivien West
- Margaret Wilson
- Vera Zimeleva
