= Sometimes I'm Happy, Sometimes I'm Blue =

Sometimes I'm Happy, Sometimes I'm Blue may refer to

- "Sometimes I'm Happy (Sometimes I'm Blue)", a 1927 popular song by Vincent Youmans and Irving Caesar
- Sometimes I'm Happy, Sometimes I'm Blue (Jill Corey album), 1957
- Sometimes I'm Happy, Sometimes I'm Blue, an album by Eddy Arnold
