= June Winters =

American actress and singer (1918–2015)

June Winters (May 17, 1918 — March 29, 2015) was an American actress and singer who was actively performing from the mid-1930s into the 1960s. She first came to prominence starring in the Broadway musical Hellzapoppin at the Winter Garden Theatre from 1938 through 1941. A versatile performer, her career spanned a wide array of genres from vaudeville to musicals to opera and popular music. Married to trumpeter and songwriter Hugo Peretti, she achieved her greatest success creating content for children as the "Lady in Blue" in partnership with her husband; releasing dozens of albums with sung and spoken material from 1947 into the early 1960s. The character Lady in Blue also had her own comic strip and Saturday morning radio program on NBC Radio. The couple also co-founded the Mayfair Records company.

== Life and career ==
Born in Hazleton, Pennsylvania, Winters began her career in repertory theatre at the age of 16 performing with the Clyde Davis Players, a traveling theatre troupe, in 1936. She moved to New York City in 1938 where she studied singing with celebrated voice teacher Estelle Liebling.

At the age of 18, Winters' abilities as a coloratura soprano drew the attention of conductor Ernö Rapée who cast her in a novelty act with another young coloratura soprano, Cyrel Roodney, for performances in a variety show at the Radio City Music Hall in 1938. In the program both girls performed music extending as high as an F#6 above a High C. Receiving positive responses from audiences, Winters and Roodney were both cast in the Broadway musical Hellzapoppin at the Winter Garden Theatre in 1938. This show was Winters major break, and she remained with the show for the next three years.

After leaving Broadway in 1941, Winters spent the remaining years of World War II performing with the Boston Comic Opera Company (BCOC) with whom she toured as a leading soprano in productions of several operettas by Gilbert and Sullivan. With the BCOC she starred in a productions of The Mikado (as Yum-Yum), H.M.S. Pinafore (as Josephine), Ruddigore (as Rose Maybud), Iolanthe (as Phyllis), The Gondoliers (as Gianetta), Patience (as the title heroine), and The Pirates of Penzance (as Mabel) at Boston's Majestic Theatre in 1942. She performed in these same operas on tour with the BCOC in 1942–1943, with one stop including a lengthy stay at the National Theatre in Washington D.C. Some of the other stops on the tour included the Studebaker Theater in Chicago (1943), and the Biltmore Theater, Los Angeles (1943).

In 1944 Winters was one of several entertainers who volunteered at the Stage Door Canteen to entertain American troops. In 1946 she began working as a nightclub singer in Manhattan. From 1948 through 1951 she starred in multiple vaudeville productions at Radio City Music Hall; performing as a soloist with an orchestra led by conductor Alexander Smallens, and with entertainers like The Rockettes, and Cilly Feindt.

In 1943 Winters met trumpeter and songwriter Hugo Peretti, and the couple married that same year. Their marriage lasted until Peretti's death forty three years later in 1986. Together the couple had two daughters, and they co-founded Mayfair Records in 1946. In 1947 the couple released Lady in Blue, the first of many children's albums featuring Winters as that eponymous character on the Mayfair label. By 1949, Winters's character "The Lady in Blue" was appearing periodically on children's programs on NBC Radio and NBC television, and had its own comic strip, in addition to having a series of children's albums. On screen she performed in the 1950 film International Burlesque By 1951 she had her own radio program, Lady in Blue, on NBC Radio on Saturday mornings.

In 1957 Mayfair Records was acquired by the newly formed Roulette Records with Peretti hired to lead the children's division of the record label. Thereafter, Winter's recordings as 'Lady in Blue' were released on the Roulette label. By the time she retired from performance in the 1960s, Winters had recorded dozens of children's albums as the 'Lady in Blue'.

In addition to her children's albums, Winters also recorded popular music. In 1942 she was signed with Continental Records, and recorded the songs "All Alone", "Last Night on the Back Porch", "Night Time", and "I Will Find My Way" for her first recording. In 1950 she recorded Jerry Bresler's "Christmas in My Heart" for Mercury Records. In 1954 she released singles "Reading Old Letters" and "I Don't Want to Be Worshipped"; again with Mercury Records.

Winters died in Bergenfield, New Jersey on March 29, 2015, at the age of 96.
