= Canadian Amateur Musicians/Musiciens Amateurs du Canada =

Canadian nonprofit organization

Canadian Amateur Musicians/Musiciens Amateurs du Canada (CAMMAC) is a Canadian nonprofit organization supporting amateur music making at all ages and levels.

CAMMAC runs a summer music centre (CAMMAC Lake MacDonald in the Laurentian Mountains northwest of Montreal, Quebec. CAMMAC also holds regional activities year-round in Montreal, Toronto, and Ottawa-Gatineau. The Music Centre offers individual weeks of classes and music-making opportunities for adults and children during nine summer weeks. The different weeks emphasize different kinds of music. The regions support a variety of music-making, including, in different regions, monthly choral readings, orchestral performances, and specialized groups such as madrigal singing, jazz band, chamber music workshops and recorder ensembles. The Music Centre also offers occasional activities on weekends during the year and supports a lending library of musical material.

The Montréal region, which is the largest by membership, organizes a regularly rehearsing amateur orchestra. All regions organize local readings and workshops. Apart from other readings and workshops, since 1988 the Ottawa-Gatineau region has organized an annual Come Sing Messiah event, with over 700 participating singers.

== History ==
CAMMAC was founded in 1953 by George and Carl Little, with their wives, Madeleine and Frances. The four set up a music centre at Otter Lake in the Laurentians, and began organizing a music camp which included music from many cultures.

Other active founding members were Mario Duschenes, who taught recorder for many years; and Walter and Otto Joachim. In 1968, CAMMAC opened a summer music camp at Lake MacDonald at Harrington, Quebec. Canadian baritone and educator Jan Simons was general director of CAMMAC from 1969 to 1990, and taught at the Lake MacDonald centre for 50 years. While CAMMAC's focus has been amateur music making, a number of alumni have gone on to professional careers in music, in some cases coming back as teachers.

From 1978 to 2009, CAMMAC also operated a second music centre in the Toronto area (various locations), called the CAMMAC Ontario Music Centre. This centre was renamed Lake Field Music in 2010, moved to the Lakefield College School in the Kawartha Lakes area of Ontario), and operates as an independent entity. At various times, in addition to the regions mentioned above, CAMMAC chapters were active in Quebec City and Nova Scotia. Since July 2020, CAMMAC's summer music camp has been offering a wide range of music classes online. There was a wide range of disciplines and genres, from classical piano to world percussion. Private and semi-private classes, group classes, workshops and conferences are available, offered by an impressive lineup of experienced professional musicians. Notable conferences include 400 Years of Opera, A History of One of the Major Genres of Classical Music, presented in collaboration with the Opéra de Montréal.
