= Last Night on the Back Porch =

"Last Night on the Back Porch (I Loved Her Best of All)" is a popular song with music by Carl Schraubstader and lyrics by Lew Brown, published in 1923. It was introduced in the Broadway revue George White's Scandals where it was performed by Winnie Lightner.

The October 19, 1923 released sound recording of the song by Paul Whiteman Orchestra and the American Quartet on Victor 19139

The song was popularized in 1924 by Paul Whiteman (recorded for Victor on September 4, 1923, vocals by the American Quartet); and by a recording by Ernest Hare and Billy Jones, both of which reached the charts of the day.

== Other notable versions ==
- Green Brothers Novelty Band (1923)
- June Winters (1942, Continental Records)
- Bing Crosby for the album Bing with a Beat (1957).
- Jill Corey (Sometimes I'm Happy, Sometimes I'm Blue, 1957)
- The Andrews Sisters for their album The Andrews Sisters Sing the Dancing '20s (1958, Capitol).
- Alma Cogan (1959) This briefly entered the UK charts reaching the No. 27 position.
- Frankie Vaughan for his album Singin' Happy (1961)
- The Baskerville Hounds 1967 single for Buddah Records catalog # BDA-17
- St. Louis Ragtimers (Steamin' Ahead, 1993)
- UnderAge (We Go Together, 2006)
