= Reaching for the Moon (1930 film) =

1930 film

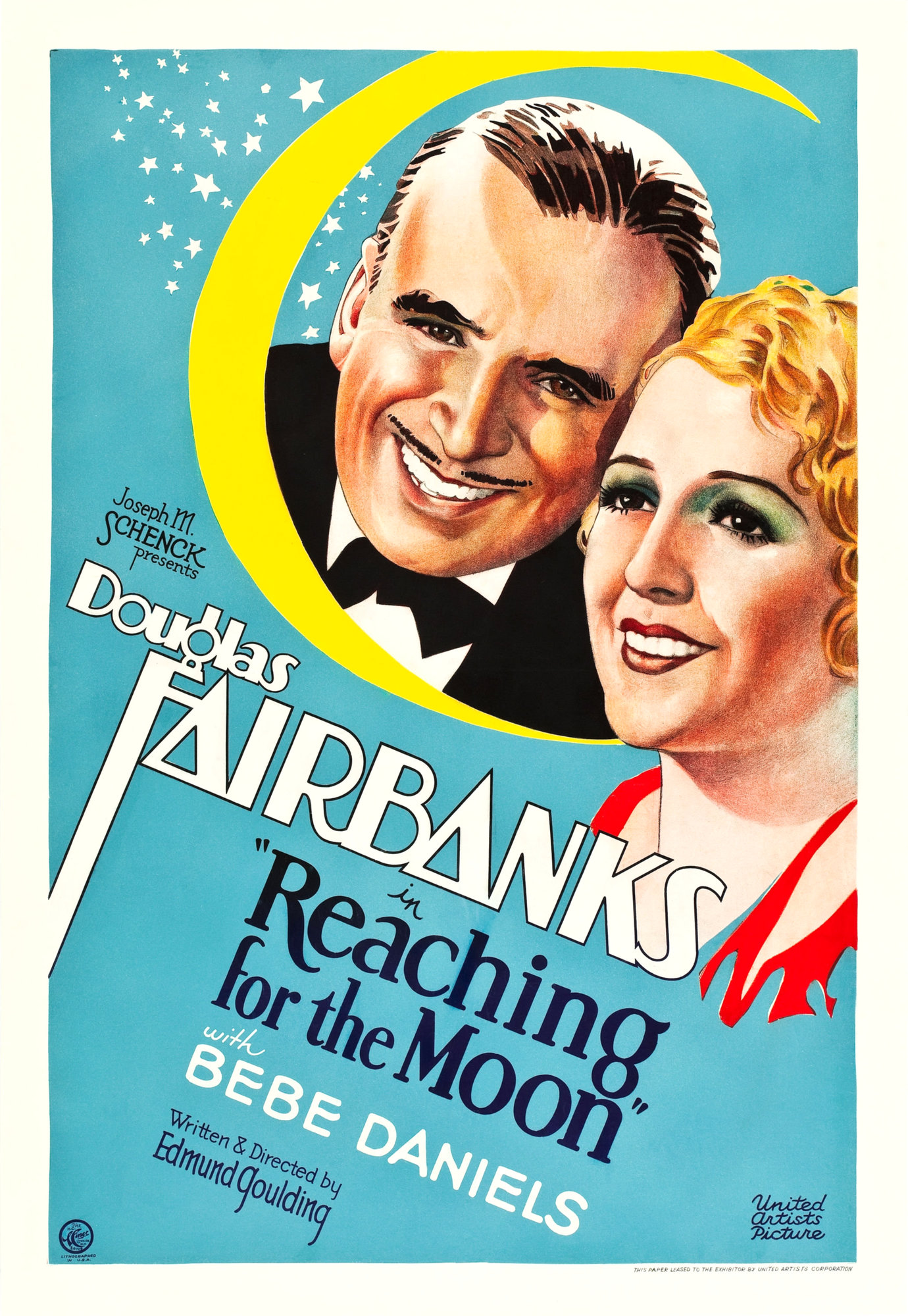
- Directed by: Edmund Goulding
- Written by: Edmund Goulding; Elsie Janis (additional dialogue)
- Story by: Irving Berlin
- Produced by: Joseph M. Schenck; Douglas Fairbanks (uncredited)
- Starring: Douglas Fairbanks; Bebe Daniels
- Cinematography: Ray June and Robert Planck
- Edited by: Lloyd Nosler and Hal C. Kern
- Music by: Irving Berlin; Alfred Newman (musical direction)
- Production companies: Joseph M. Schenck Presents; Artcinema Associates Inc. Feature Productions
- Distributed by: United Artists
- Release date: December 29, 1930
- Running time: 91 minutes
- Country: United States
- Language: English

Reaching for the Moon is a 1930 American pre-Code black and white musical film. Originally released at 91 minutes; surviving versions are usually cut to 62 minutes. A 74-minute version aired in 1998 on AMC. The DVD version runs just under 72 minutes. The film's working title was Lucky Break and is known as Para alcanzar la Luna in Spain. It is not to be confused with the 1917 Fairbanks silent film Reaching for the Moon.

== Plot ==
Reaching for the Moon (1930)

Wall Street wizard Larry Day, new to the ways of love, is coached by his valet Roger. He follows Vivian Benton on an ocean liner, where cocktails, laced with a "love potion", work their magic. He then loses his fortune in the market crash and feels he has also lost his girl.

== Cast ==
- Douglas Fairbanks as Larry Day
- Bebe Daniels as Vivian Benton
- Edward Everett Horton as Roger
- Claud Allister as Sir Horace Partington Chelmsford
- Jack Mulhall as Jimmy Carrington
- Walter Walker as James Benton
- June MacCloy as Kitty
- Helen Jerome Eddy as Secretary
- Bing Crosby as Bing

Uncredited (in order of appearance)
Phillips Tead	reporter questioning Sir Horace Partington Chelmsford
Emmett Corrigan	bank president speaking at Larry's reception
Lloyd Whitlock	Larry's associate
Toshia Mori	coat girl at Larry's reception
Alphonse Martell	warden
Adrienne D'Ambricourt	Vivian's maid
Marcelle Corday	Vivian's maid
Larry Steers	flier
Bud Geary	flier
Florence Wix	quarrelsome woman on ship
Kate Price	heavyset woman on ship
Luana Walters	party girl on ship
Tot Qualters	woman at ship's party
Dennis O'Keefe	man at ship's party
Jay Eaton	man at ship's party
Bill Elliott	man at ship's party
Edmund Mortimer	older man at ship's party

== Background ==
The film was originally intended to be a musical with songs written by Irving Berlin but problems soon developed. From the start, Berlin found Edmund Goulding, the director, difficult to work with. Also by mid-1930 the studio realized that the public's demand for musicals had disappeared. So Goulding jettisoned many of Berlin's songs from the score. Although just five Berlin songs had been recorded, the film, even in its scaled-down form, proved very expensive to make. By the time the filming was complete, the costs had come to about a million dollars, a huge budget for the times, and one that virtually ruled out the possibility of the film returning a profit.

The one song that was retained was "When the Folks High Up Do the Mean Low Down" introduced by Bing Crosby who had filmed it late at night after completing his work at the Cocoanut Grove. Variety commented on this song specifically, saying: "None of the Berlin songs is left other than a chorus of hot numbers apparently named "Lower Than Lowdown" [sic]. Tune suddenly breaks into the running in the ship's bar when Bing Crosby, of the Whiteman Rhythm Boys, gives it a strong start for just a chorus which, in turn, is ably picked up by Miss Daniels, also for merely a chorus, and then in an exterior shot to the deck where June MacCloy sends the lyric and melody for a gallop of half a chorus.

== Soundtrack ==
- "When the Folks High-Up Do the Mean Low-Down"

Written by Irving Berlin
Sung by Bing Crosby, Bebe Daniels, June MacCloy and chorus.

- "Reaching for the Moon"

Written by Irving Berlin
(heard instrumentally over the opening credits, as background music for a love scene, then briefly at the end)
