= Tot Qualters =

American actress and dancer (1894–1974)

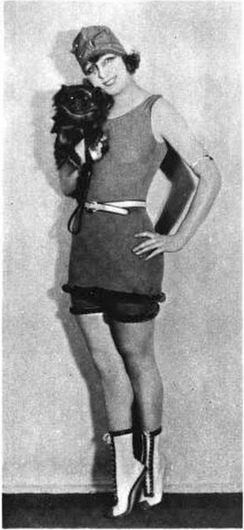
Tot Qualters modeling a fur-trimmed swimsuit, from a 1921 publication.

Tot Qualters (March 28, 1894 – March 27, 1974) was an American actress, dancer, and singer in musical theatre.

== Early life ==
Marguerite (or Margaret) Qualters was born in 1894, in Detroit, the daughter of Jack Qualters and Anna Qualters. She and her four sisters went into stage careers after their father died. Tot's sister Cassie Qualters joined the Ziegfeld Follies with her. Their brother Joe Qualters was a cabaret singer in Detroit.

== Career ==
Tot Qualters was on stage in Detroit from her early teens. Qualters' New York debut came in 1912, in Ziegfeld's A Winsome Widow at the Moulin Rouge Theater. Other stage appearances included Chin Chin (1914), Stop! Look! Listen! (1915-1916) as Nora Marks, Ziegfeld Follies of 1916, Miss 1917, Midnight Rounders (1920), The Passing Show of 1921, Make It Snappy (1922, leading with Eddie Cantor) and Whoopee! (1928, also with Eddie Cantor). For her performance in The Passing Show of 1921, she was noted as a "decorative jazz demonstrator." While performing in Make It Snappy, she gave Eddie Cantor the nickname "Banjo Eyes." This nickname stuck, and later became the title of a 1941 Broadway musical in which Cantor starred. She also appeared in the film Reaching for the Moon (1930), with Douglas Fairbanks Sr. and Bebe Daniels.

"Tot Qualters sports a figure as cute as her name," observed The Dial's theatre reviewer in 1921. The Boston Daily Globe described her specialty as "loose-jointed eccentric dancing" in 1922.

== Personal life ==
In 1929, Qualters was in a legal dispute with real estate dealer Arthur Ettlinger over ownership of a dog. Walter Winchell mentioned seeing Tot Qualters in 1968, as a fixture at Max's Stage Deli. Tot Qualters died in 1974, the day before her 80th birthday, in New York City. Her niece, Michael Pollock, also went into the performing arts.
