= The Sheik of Araby =

1921 song

- Sheet music

Song
- Published: 1921 by Waterson, Berlin & Snyder, Inc.
- Genre: Jazz
- Songwriters: Composer: Ted Snyder; Lyricist: Harry B. Smith, Francis Wheeler

"The Sheik of Araby" is a song that was written in 1921 by Harry B. Smith and Francis Wheeler, with music by Ted Snyder. It was composed in response to the popularity of the Rudolph Valentino feature film The Sheik.

"The Sheik of Araby" was a Tin Pan Alley hit, and a verse also appears in the novel The Great Gatsby (1925) by F. Scott Fitzgerald. In 1926, Fleischer Studios released a cartoon with this song, recorded in Phonofilm, as part of their Song Car-Tunes series, and a live action short with this title was filmed in Phonofilm in the UK, directed by Miles Mander.

== Origin ==
In 1925, composer Ted Snyder said that the song's original title was "The Rose of Araby". The Indianapolis Star reported, "A friend of Mr. Snyder's, hearing the oriental melody and recalling the popularity of the book The Sheik, held out for the masculine title, but Mr. Snyder said that a sheik meant but little or nothing in the lives of most people, whereas "The Rose of Araby", the work emphasized romantic themes. Then he saw the advance posters of Rudolf Valentino in the picture and gave in. So "The Sheik of Araby" came into its own – though Mr. Snyder said he whistled it around his office for some six months without anyone getting excited over it."

== Reception ==
- The Huntington Press wrote, "The song hit "The Sheik of Araby" is being sung and played by millions of music lovers throughout the country. The melody has the whole town by the ears. It is being played by dance orchestras everywhere."
- The Orlando Sentinel wrote, "That's the way it goes! They're all singing it! The whole bally town is echoing and re-echoing to the strains of that raging song hit "The Sheik of Araby" – the song of the desert chief that has the whole nation by the ears. It's being played in ten thousand homes and club houses. The pianos tinkle it – guitars and banjos are strumming it – and the phonographs are reeling it off in a flood of jazzy melody. It's hit the town like a cloudburst of harmony."

== Notable recordings and performances ==
- Recordings by Ray Miller and the Club Royal Orchestra were released in 1922.
- Peter Dawson recorded it in 1922 with vocals, it is possibly the oldest recording to feature vocals.
- Eddie Cantor performed it in his revue Make It Snappy in April 1922.
- Django Reinhardt et le Quintette du Hot Club de France, avec Stéphane Grappelli recorded it in April 27 1937.
- Jack Teagarden recorded it in 1939
- In November 1936, Don Albert's band recorded the first version with the chant "with no pants on" between the lines of lyrics.
- Fats Waller released a version in 1938, on the Victor label
- Alice Faye and Betty Grable performed the song in the 1940 film Tin Pan Alley
- Spike Jones and his City Slickers. Their version includes a quote from "Khosn kale mazel tov".
- Fats Domino
- Louis Prima frequently sang it as a medley with "When You're Smiling".
- The Everly Brothers recorded the song in 1961.
- The Beatles covered this song in 1962 at their unsuccessful Decca audition with George Harrison as the lead singer and Pete Best on the drums. The band based their arrangement on a version released by Joe Brown and The Bruvvers the year before. The Beatles' recording can be found on Anthology 1.
- The November 4, 1977 episode of The Muppet Show guest starring Bernadette Peters features Uncle Deadly singing the song with an Anything Muppet girl.
- Leon Redbone's recording was featured in an episode of Boardwalk Empire.
- Tim Armstrong in June 2013 for his project Tim Timebomb and Friends
- Alan Silvestri covered this song in 2016 for Robert Zemeckis film Allied.
- Jean Shepherd frequently sang the song during musical interludes on his radio show.
- British comedian Tommy Cooper released a humorous version during his 1978 live show
- The song was featured in Heaven Can Wait (1943) and in Valentino (1977) with words of parody by Ken Russell, performed by Chris Ellis.
- Coleman Hawkins & His All Star Octet, 1940 used in Ken Burn's War series

== Related song ==
In 1926, to go with the film The Son of the Sheik, Ted Snyder worked parts of the melody into "That Night in Araby", a related song with words by Billy Rose.

== See also ==
- List of 1920s jazz standards
