= 1923 in British music =

This is a summary of 1923 in music in the United Kingdom.

== Events ==
- 12 June – William Walton's Façade, a collaboration with Edith Sitwell, is given its first public performance at the Aeolian Hall, London. The critics' reception is unfavourable.
- 4 July – Ralph Vaughan Williams's English Folk Song Suite is premièred at Kneller Hall, conducted by Hector Adkins.
- September–October – Philip Heseltine (Peter Warlock) and E. J. Moeran tour East Anglia in search of original folk music.
- 11 November – The première of John Foulds's A World Requiem is held at the Royal Albert Hall in London, with soloists including Herbert Heyner. It is repeated on that date each year until 1926.
- 23 December – The Beggar's Opera by John Gay and Dr Pepusch, with score restored by Frederic Austin, ends its record run of 1,463 performances at the Lyric Theatre, Hammersmith; Austin himself plays Peachum, with Frederick Ranalow as Macheath and Sylvia Nelis as Polly.
- date unknown
  - The Royal Scottish Country Dance Society is founded by Jean Milligan and Ysobel Stewart.
  - The moving-coil microphone is developed by Captain H. J. Round and is adopted by the BBC's London studios.
  - Edward Elgar moves to the village of Kempsey, Worcestershire, where he will live until 1927.
  - Arthur Bliss's father retires to California. Arthur goes with him to work as a conductor, lecturer, pianist and occasional critic.
  - Eugene Aynsley Goossens becomes conductor of the Rochester Philharmonic Orchestra in the United States.
  - Henry Tippett agrees to support his son Michael Tippett's studies at the Royal College of Music, where Michael is accepted despite lacking the entry qualifications.
  - The Savoy Orpheans is formed as a resident dance band at the Savoy Hotel, London, by Debroy Somers.

== Classical music: new works ==
- Kenneth J. Alford – Cavalry of the Clouds
- Granville Bantock – Suite from Cathay (words by Ezra Pound)
- Arthur Bliss – String Quartet
- Gerald Finzi – A Severn Rhapsody
- John Ireland – Cello Sonata
- Constant Lambert – 2 Songs (words by Sacheverell Sitwell), for soprano, flute and harp
- Roger Quilter – "The Fuchsia Tree", Op. 25 No. 2
- Cyril Scott – The Incompetent Apothecary (ballet)
- Ralph Vaughan Williams – Sea Songs
- William Walton – Toccata for Violin and Piano

== Opera ==
- Gustav Holst – The Perfect Fool

== Musical theatre ==
- London Calling!, a revue produced by André Charlot with music and lyrics by Noël Coward, co-starring Coward and Gertrude Lawrence, opens at the Duke of York's Theatre on 4 September and runs for 367 performances.

== Births ==
- 21 April – Ronald Cass, film composer (died 2006)
- 15 May – John Lanchbery, composer and conductor (died 2003)
- 4 August – Arthur Butterworth, composer (died 2014)
- 19 August – Dill Jones, pianist (died 1984)
- 30 September – Donald Swann, musician (died 1994)
- 5 October – Glynis Johns, actress and singer (died 2024)
- 10 November – Anne Shelton, singer (died 1994)

== Deaths ==
- 18 January – Kate Santley, German-born actress, singer and comedian (exact age unknown)
- 10 July – Albert Chevalier, actor, singer, songwriter and music hall performer, 62
- 27 August – Letty Lind, singer and burlesque performer, 61
- 12 October – John Cadvan Davies, poet and hymn-writer, 77
- date unknown – Nicholas Kilburn, choral conductor and composer, 80

== See also ==
- 1923 in the United Kingdom
