= Violin Concerto No. 1 (Prokofiev) =

Concerto by Sergei Prokofiev

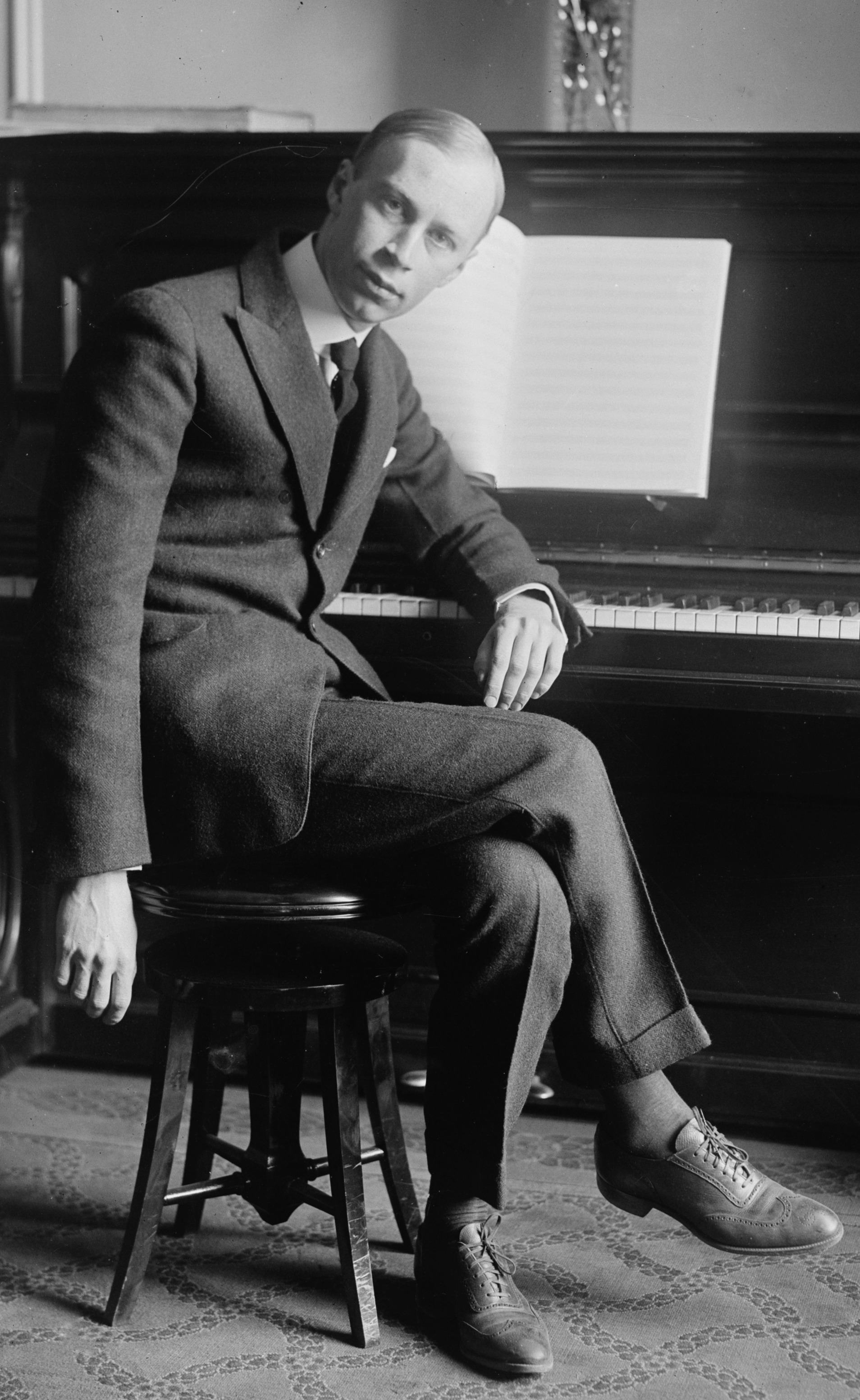
Prokofiev ca. 1918

Sergei Prokofiev began his Violin Concerto No. 1 in D major, Op. 19, as a concertino in 1915 but soon abandoned it to work on his opera The Gambler. He returned to the concerto in the summer of 1917. It was premiered on October 18, 1923 at the Paris Opera with Marcel Darrieux playing the violin part and the Paris Opera Orchestra conducted by Serge Koussevitzky. Igor Stravinsky made his debut as conductor at the same concert, conducting the first performance of his own Octet for Wind Instruments.

== Structure ==
The concerto is written in three movements:

1. Andantino
2. Scherzo: Vivacissimo
3. Moderato – Allegro moderato

== History ==
Despite the events leading to the abdication of Tsar Nicholas II of Russia and eventually the October Revolution, 1917 became Prokofiev's most productive year compositionally. Along with this concerto he completed the "Classical" Symphony, the Third and Fourth Piano Sonatas, and the Visions Fugitives for piano. He also began the cantata Seven, They Are Seven, based on Chaldean texts, and worked on the Third Piano Concerto. Nevertheless, Prokofiev continued his habit of incorporating previously composed sections in the violin concerto (something he would also do in the Third Piano Concerto). He composed the concerto's opening melody in 1915, during his love affair with Nina Mescherskaya. The remaining movements were partly inspired by a 1916 Saint Petersburg performance of Karol Szymanowski's Myths by Polish violinist Paul Kochanski.

Its premiere in Paris was a relative failure, partly due to the work being overshadowed by Stravinsky's more modish Octet. The Concerto's premiere had also been delayed some seven years after it had been completed, due to Prokofiev's itinerant existence at that time and the difficulty in finding a soloist. Had the premiere taken place in Petrograd in 1917, as initially planned, Kochanski would have taken the part. By 1923, however, Kochanski was unavailable for the scheduled Paris premiere. Bronisław Huberman would not even look at the score. Nathan Milstein was still in Russia. The violinist who finally tackled the solo part was Sergei Koussevitzky's concertmaster, Marcel Darrieux; although not famous, he was a solid musician and a more than able violinist (Darrieux also premiered Kurt Weill's Concerto for Violin and Wind Instruments in 1925), which was all that was necessary for a performance. Joseph Szigeti was in the audience, and was so impressed with the work that he took the Concerto into his repertory. The following year Szigeti achieved success when he played the Concerto in Prague with Fritz Reiner as conductor, then toured it around Europe and the United States. However, the U.S. premiere was not played by Szigeti, but by Richard Burgin, the concertmaster of the Boston Symphony Orchestra, on 24 April 1925, again under Koussevitzky.

There were also the musical tastes of the Parisian public to consider. Audience members, especially those who came to Koussevitzky concerts, wanted modern music with a certain amount of shock value. The fact that The Rite of Spring had failed a decade earlier was relative—the choreography had been a failure; the music was a success, as proved a few months later when it was heard enthusiastically in concert. While Paris welcomed spiked dissonant works such as the ballet Chout (The Buffoon) and the Scythian Suite, the First Violin Concerto was simply too Romantic in tone for their preferences. The composer Georges Auric even called the work "Mendelssohnian."

The premiere of the work in the Soviet Union is also worth noting since it was given just three days after the Paris premiere by two 19-year-olds, Nathan Milstein and Vladimir Horowitz. Horowitz played the orchestral part on the piano. Milstein later wrote in his memoirs, From Russia to the West, "I feel that if you have a great pianist like Horowitz playing with you, you don't need an orchestra." Milstein and Horowitz also introduced Karol Szymanowski's First Violin Concerto at the same concert.

In 1979, Jerome Robbins's ballet Opus 19/The Dreamer, choreographed to the concerto, premiered at New York City Ballet, with Mikhail Baryshnikov and Patricia McBride leading the cast.

== Analysis ==
The work opens ethereally, gains momentum and becalms; this describes both the opening movement, and the piece taken as a whole. The three movements begin in D major, E minor, and G minor respectively, and the work closes in a manner similar to that of the opening movement, seeming to climb peacefully. Apart from the solo violin, the concerto is scored for moderate-sized orchestra including two flutes (second flute doubling on piccolo), two oboes, two clarinets, two bassoons, four horns, two trumpets, tuba, timpani, snare drum, tambourine, harp, and strings.

=== I. Andantino ===
The first movement, marked Andantino and commencing in 6/8 meter, opens with a lyrical violin melody to be played sognando (dreamily) and pianissimo (very softly) over viola tremolos. The solo violin is joined in dialogue by the flutes, clarinets, and oboes. The second theme, more virtuosic and forceful, is marked narrante; David Oistrakh recalled that Prokofiev had said "play it as though you're trying to convince someone of something." Shifts to 4/4 time and C major serve to accentuate the contrast with the principal theme. The development begins with the soloist playing pizzicato, and proceeds to develop upon the principal theme. In a brief recapitulation, the theme is restated, not by the soloist, but by the principal flute, and accompanied elaborately by the soloist and harp.

=== II. Scherzo: Vivacissimo ===
The second movement, a scherzo marked Vivacissimo, is in rondo form. Michael Steinberg wrote that the movement 'represents the "savage" element' of the concerto 'as against the generally more lyrical first and third movements. The music, full of contrast, is by turns amusing, naughty, for a while even malevolent, athletic, and always violinistically ingenious and brilliant. It seems to be over in a moment.'

=== III. Moderato – Allegro moderato ===
The third and final movement, initially marked Moderato, starts with a bassoon theme over a metronomic eighth-note orchestral accompaniment. The soloist assumes the theme from the bassoon before dropping back to an accompanying role when the movement transitions to a section marked Allegro moderato. The solo violin increasingly interchanges between the roles of soloist and accompanist. The movement ends with the music fading away in tempo and dynamics, and quotes the ending of the first movement, concluding in almost exactly the same way.

== Recordings ==
A number of recordings of the concerto have been issued commercially. Selected recordings include:

Title and release date	Violinist	Orchestra and conductor	Label and reference
Prokofiev: Violin Concertos Nos. 1 & 2	David Oistrakh	London Symphony Orchestra, Lovro von Matačić	Warner Classics / Alto: ALC1318
Prokofiev: Violin Concertos Nos. 1 & 2	Isaac Stern	Philadelphia Orchestra, Eugene Ormandy	Sony Classical
Prokofiev: Violin Concertos Nos. 1 & 2	Ruggiero Ricci	Orchestra of Radio Luxembourg, Louis de Froment	Vox / Naxos: VOX-NX-2432
Prokofiev: Violin Concertos Nos. 1 & 2 / Sonata in D Major (1996)	Tedi Papavrami	Polish National Radio Symphony Orchestra, Antoni Wit	Naxos: 8.553494
Prokofiev: Violin Concertos Nos. 1 & 2	Jennifer Frautschi	Seattle Symphony, Gerard Schwarz	Artek: AR-0020-2
Prokofiev: Violin Concertos Nos. 1 & 2	Lydia Mordkovitch	Royal Scottish National Orchestra, Neeme Järvi	Chandos: CHAN10540X
Prokofiev: Violin Concertos Nos. 1 & 2	Viktoria Mullova	Royal Philharmonic Orchestra, André Previn	Philips / Decca
Prokofiev: Violin Concertos Nos. 1 & 2; Sonata for Solo Violin	Gil Shaham	London Symphony Orchestra, André Previn	Deutsche Grammophon: 447 758-2
Shostakovich & Prokofiev: Violin Concertos (2006)	Sarah Chang	Berlin Philharmonic, Simon Rattle	EMI Classics
Prokofiev – Violin Concerto No. 1 in D Major, Op. 19	Mila Georgieva	Plovdiv Philharmonic Orchestra, Nayden Todorov	Hal Leonard: 1007257
Shostakovich, D.: Violin Concerto No. 1 / Prokofiev, S.: Violin Concerto No. 1 (2012)	Ilya Kaler	Polish National Radio Symphony Orchestra, Antoni Wit	Naxos: 8.572954
Prokofiev & Sibelius: Violin Concertos (2010)	Vilde Frang	WDR Symphony Orchestra Cologne, Thomas Søndergård	Warner Classics: 6844132
Prokofiev: Complete Works for Violin (2013)	James Ehnes	BBC Philharmonic, Gianandrea Noseda	Chandos: CHAN10787(2)
Prokofiev: Violin Concertos Nos. 1 & 2 (2016)	Vadim Gluzman	Estonian National Symphony Orchestra, Neeme Järvi	BIS: BIS-2142 SACD
Visions of Prokofiev (2018)	Lisa Batiashvili	Chamber Orchestra of Europe, Yannick Nézet-Séguin	Deutsche Grammophon: 4798529
Sibelius & Prokofiev: Violin Concertos (2024)	Janine Jansen	Oslo Philharmonic, Klaus Mäkelä	Decca: 4854748

== Bibliography ==
- Jaffé, Daniel. Sergey Prokofiev. (London: Phaidon, 1998). ISBN 0-7148-3513-7
- Phillips, Anthony (translator and annotator). Sergey Prokofiev: Diaries 1915–1923 (London: Faber, 2008). ISBN 978-0-571-22630-6
- Prokofiev, Sergei (trans. & ed. Oleg Prokofiev). Sergei Prokofiev: Soviet Diary 1927 and Other Writings (London: Faber, 1991). ISBN 0-571-16158-8
- Steinberg, Michael. The Concerto (Oxford and New York: Oxford University Press, 1998). ISBN 0-19-510330-0
