= Marcel Darrieux =

French violinist (1891–1989)

- Born: October 18, 1891; Bordeaux, France
- Died: September 2, 1989 (aged 97) Saint-Jean-de-Luz, France
- Genre: Classical music
- Instrument: Violin

Marcel Darrieux (18 October 1891 – 2 September 1989) was a French classical violinist, particularly known for premiering Sergei Prokofiev's 1st Violin Concerto in 1923.

== Biography ==
Born in Bordeaux, Darrieux graduated from the Conservatoire de Bordeaux (1906) then from the Conservatoire de Paris (1912). Henri Berthelier and Lucien Capet were among his teachers.

From 1921, he belonged to the orchestra of the Opéra-Comique. Simultaneously, in the early 1920s, he was concertmaster of the Concerts Koussevitzky orchestra under the direction of Serge Koussevitzky. He is best known as the first interpreter of Prokofiev's 1st Violin Concerto premiered on 18 October 1923. After the refusal of several well-known violin virtuosos (in particular, Bronisław Huberman) to approach this concerto, the composer entrusted the soloist part to the first solo violin of the orchestra. As Darrieux wrote in a letter to Prokofiev, "the musician was until then in absolute darkness, and since he played your concerto with Koussevitzky, I received an invitation to perform it in Paris 3 times during the season, not counting the invitations to the provinces."

In the second half of the 1920s, Darrieux collaborated with the conductor Walther Straram. From 1926, he was the first violin of his orchestra (Orchestre des concerts Straram). On 11 June 1925, Darrieux and Straram premiered Kurt Weill's Concerto for Violin and Wind Orchestra, Op. 12. Similarly, on 24 February 1927, they premiered Dimitrios Levidis's Poème pour violon et orchestre. In the 1930s, Darrieux was part of the Concerts Colonne. In 1937, he was a member of the jury of the Queen Elisabeth Competition.

With the flutist Marcel Moyse and violist Pierre Pasquier, he recorded Ludwig van Beethoven's Serenade for flute, violin and viola in D major Op. 25. These three musicians participated in the recording of Manuel de Falla's Harpsichord Concerto. Accompanied on piano, he also recorded isolated pieces by Robert Schumann, Isaac Albéniz, Gabriel Pierné and others in the 1920s.

Darrieux died in Saint-Jean-de-Luz on 2 September 1989.

== Bibliography ==
- Cardoze, Edmond (1992). Musique et musiciens en Aquitaine (in French). Vol. 1. Bordeaux: Aubéron. p. 47. ISBN 2-908650-66-5. OCLC 466936366. bnf=cb36698635b..

== Distinctions ==
- Chevalier of the Légion d'honneur
- Chevalier of the Order of Léopold
