= Albert Guille =

French opera singer 1854–1914

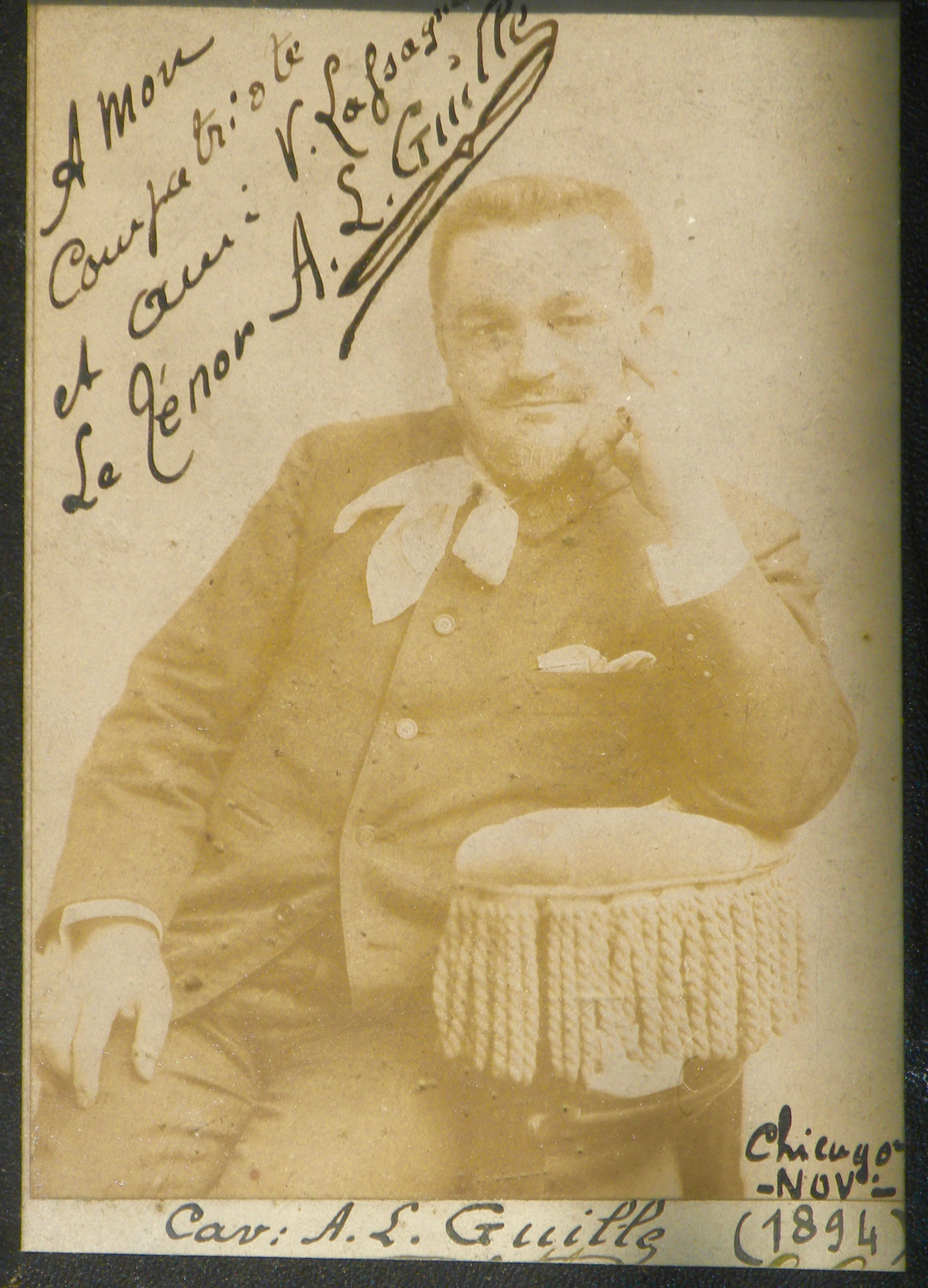
Albert Guille, autographed photo, Chicago 1894

Albert Louis Guille (1854–1914) was a French operatic tenor. He had a heyday in the United States in the mid-1880s through mid-1890s and for a time was a preferred partner of soprano Adelina Patti. For his prominence he was decorated as a Knight of the Order of Christ and enjoyed using the title Chevalier.

== Career ==
Guille was born in Avignon, 31 January 1854 of Joseph Vincent and Elizabeth Guille.

He became known for tenor roles in French language opera: Manrico in Verdi's Le Trouvère, Raoul in Meyerbeer's Les Huguenots, Arnold in Rossini's Guillaume Tell, Gaston in Verdi's Jérusalem, Vasco de Gama in Meyerbeer's L’Africaine, Masaniello in Auber's La muette de Portici, and Dauphon in Halévy's Charles VI. In the United States he performed in Boston, New York City, Cleveland, Pittsburgh, New Orleans, Chicago, San Francisco.

Beginning 18 November 1886 at the New York Academy of Music, Guille for six years was a tenor in the supporting cast of Adelina Patti's tours in the United States and Europe. At the Metropolitan Opera in New York he debuted as Lyonel in von Flotow's Martha 23 April 1892, a role he had sung in New York with Patti since 1887. He sang with the company for several seasons at Sunday concerts and galas, on tour, and as Turiddu in Mascagni's Cavalleria rusticana in spring 1894.

Guille felt his shortness of stature, 5-foot, 3 1/2 inches, had hampered his career, though he was known as "the little man with the big voice." Impresario Henry Eugene Abbey who arranged his tours with Patti, told him once he would have given him $2,000 a performance had he been taller. Guille replied, "If I had been six feet tall instead of the midget that I am," — even as tall as his five-foot nine wife — "my voice would have gained me $1,000,000." Even so, he said, "I have made lots of money in my day," $2,000 a month plus expenses touring internationally with Patti, up to $3,000 in his last US years with her.

In 1881 in Bordeaux Guille had married Joséphine Azibert (1854–1911) with whom he had three sons. As his career declined, Guille sang in upscale vaudeville shows. Guille died in poverty 19 August 1914 in Los Angeles, where he had been supporting himself in his last years singing in moving picture theaters.
