= Oklahoma Indian Jazz =

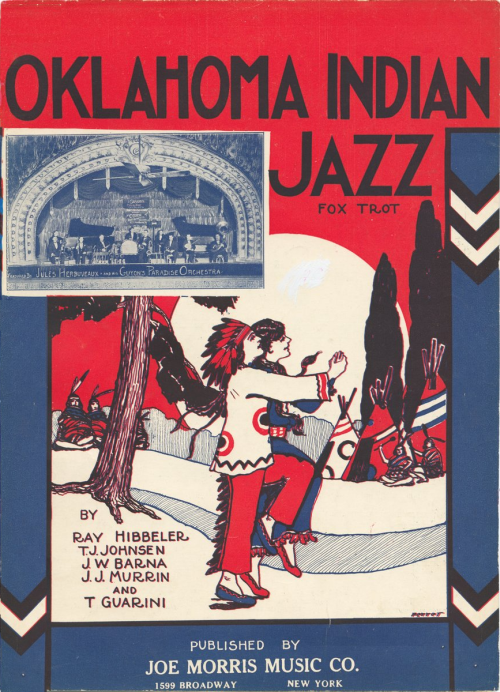
- Sheet music cover, 1923

Song
- Written: 1923
- Genre: Fox trot
- Songwriter(s): Ray Hibbler; T.J. Johnsen; J.W. Barna; J.W. Murrin; T. Guarini

"Oklahoma Indian Jazz" is a dance tune written in 1923 by Ray Hibbler, T.J. Johnsen, J.W. Barna, J.J. Murrin, and T. Guarini. It was advertised as a fox trot.

== Early recordings ==
- Ace Brigode & His Ten Virginians, Okeh 40014 (1923).
- Benson Orchestra of Chicago, Victor 19257-B (1923)
- Sol Wagner & His Orchestra, Gennett 5313-B (1923)

== Bibliography ==
- Hibbler, Ray; Johnsen, T.J.; Barna, J.W.; Murrin, J.J.; Guarini, T. (w. & m.). "Oklahoma Indian Jazz" (Sheet music). New York: Joe Morris Music Co. (1923).
