= Sometimes I'm Happy, Sometimes I'm Blue (Jill Corey album) =

Compilation album by Jill Corey
- Released: November 25, 1957
- Genre: Pop
- Label: Columbia

Professional ratings
Review scores
| Source | Rating |
|---|---|
| AllMusic | 3.5/5 stars |

Sometimes I'm Happy, Sometimes I'm Blue is an LP album by Jill Corey, released in 1957 by Columbia Records and reissued on CD November 25, 2003, by Collectables Records.

== Track listing ==
| Track # | Title | Songwriter(s) |
|---|---|---|
| 1 | "Last Night on the Back Porch" | Lew Brown/Carl Schraubstader |
| 2 | "When My Baby Smiles at Me" | Ted Lewis/Andrew Sterling/Bill Munro |
| 3 | "Ain't We Got Fun?" | Gus Kahn/Raymond Egan/Richard A. Whitling |
| 4 | "I Double Dare You" | Terry Shand/Jimmy Eaton |
| 5 | "You Got Me" | Fred Elton |
| 6 | "Bye Bye Blues" | David Bennett/Chauncey Gray/Bert Lown/Frederick Hamm |
| 7 | "Sometimes I'm Happy" | Vincent Youmans/Irving Caesar |
| 8 | "In Love in Vain" | Jerome Kern/Leo Robin |
| 9 | "Nobody's Heart" | Richard Rodgers/Lorenz Hart |
| 10 | "He Was Too Good to Me" | Richard Rodgers/Lorenz Hart |
| 11 | "Gee! I Hate to Go Home Alone" | James F. Hanley/Joe Goodwin |
| 12 | "Better Luck Next Time" | Irving Berlin |

== Tracks added in the CD version ==
- "Exactly Like You" (Jimmy McHugh/Dorothy Fields)
- "I Found a New Baby" (Jack Palmer/Spencer Williams)
- "My Reverie" (Larry Clinton)
- "Have I Told You Lately That I Love You" (Scotty Wiseman)
- "Have You Ever Been Lonely (Have You Ever Been Blue)" (George "Funky" Brown/Peter de Rose)
- "Seems Like Old Times" (Carmen Lombardo/John Jacob Loeb)
