= Ross Jungnickel =

Ross Jungnickel (1875-1962) was an American music publisher and arranger, and founder of a Baltimore Symphony Orchestra, a precursor to the modern organization of that name. He was a graduate of the Peabody Conservatory. He also composed an orchestral version of Adagio Pathetique, by Benjamin Godard, which was published in 1910.
