= Mario Duschenes =

Canadian flutist, recorder player and conductor (1923–2009)

Background information
- Born: 27 October 1923; Altona, Germany
- Died: 31 January 2009 (aged 85) Montreal, Quebec, Canada
- Occupations: Musician, conductor, music educator
- Instruments: Flute, recorder

Mario Duschenes, CM, LL.D. (27 October 1923 – 31 January 2009) was a Canadian flautist, recorder player, music educator and conductor.

== Early life ==
Mario Duschenes was born in Altona, near Hamburg, Germany in 1923, the son of Franz and Grete Duschenes. He studied the recorder, sight singing and the piano before the age of twelve. In 1935, he began studying the flute with his father and brothers. Escaping Germany just prior to World War II, he studied flute, composition and conducting at the Geneva Conservatory in Switzerland, and during the period 1943–7 completed his training with Henri Gagnebin, André Pépin, Frank Martin, Dinu Lipatti and Isabelle Nef. Duschenes won the Conservatory's Prix de Virtuosité in 1946, and the first prize at the 1947 International Competition for Musical Performers in Geneva.

== Career ==
Duschenes toured Europe as soloist with the Ars Antiqua Ensemble, and emigrated to Montreal, Quebec, Canada in September 1948, sponsored by his older brother, Rolf. He quickly became active in the Canadian musical scene, and in August 1949, staged and narrated the Canadian première of Stravinsky's Histoire du soldat at McGill University. He became principal flute of the CBC Radio Orchestra, and appeared as a soloist with the Musica Antica e Nuova, the McGill Chamber Orchestra and the Pro Musica Society. He was a founding member of the Baroque Trio of Montreal, which toured extensively, and made more than 30 recordings, including several with his friend and fellow flautist Jean-Pierre Rampal. Between 1970 and 1985, Duschenes hosted "Initiation à la musique avec Mario Duschenes" on Télévision de Radio-Canada.

Much of Duschenes' career was dedicated to inspiring a love of music among young people. He was an expert in the Carl Orff teaching method, and his work was also influenced by his marriage to a child psychologist, Ellyn Simons, whom he wed in 1951, and with whom he had five children. He was the author of widely distributed and highly regarded works of musical education, notably the Method for the Recorder I (1957) and II (1962), the School Recorder Method (1957), and Studies in Recorder Playing (1960). He also wrote and edited other works, including studies for alto recorder, and arrangements of works from the renaissance and baroque periods, of Johann Sebastian Bach, and of Leopold Mozart.

In 1953, Duschenes co-founded the CAMMAC (Canadian Amateur Musicians/Musiciens Amateurs du Canada) Music Centre in the Laurentians near Montreal, where he taught for many years. Between 1954 and 1970 he also taught at McGill University, and subsequently at the University of Montreal between 1970 and 1973.

Duschenes became a conductor of young people's concerts for many professional orchestras across Canada. He performed the role for the Quebec Symphony Orchestra (1969–73), the Montreal Symphony Orchestra (1970–81), the National Arts Centre Orchestra (1973–88), the Toronto Symphony Orchestra (1976) and at the Edmonton Symphony Orchestra in 1985. His gracious, avuncular contribution to the musical education of youth was much praised: the music critic for The Globe and Mail wrote that "For all the simplicity of Duschenes's language, he manages to achieve an intellectual level that patronises neither the children nor their parents," while that of the Montreal Gazette noted that Duschenes was "probably doing more for the image of young people's concerts than anyone else in Canada". The concerts he hosted and conducted were remembered and admired for their excellence years after they took place.

Duschenes also conducted regular orchestral concerts for the Montreal Symphony Orchestra (1973–85), the Orchestre de Chambre de Radio-Canada, and in 1985 was appointed the music director of the Newfoundland Symphony Orchestra, a position he held until 1992. He also appeared as guest conductor for other major Canadian orchestras, as well as the New Zealand Symphony Orchestra in 1987, 1989 and 1990.

Aged 85 and following a stroke, Duschenes died in Montreal on 31 January 2009.

== Honours ==
Duschenes received the Canadian Music Council Medal in 1978 and was made an Officer of the Order of Canada in 1985 for his work as an internationally known flautist, teacher and conductor. He was also awarded honorary doctorates from Concordia University (Montreal) and Memorial University of Newfoundland (St. John's).
