= Marion Weed =

American opera singer (1865–1947)

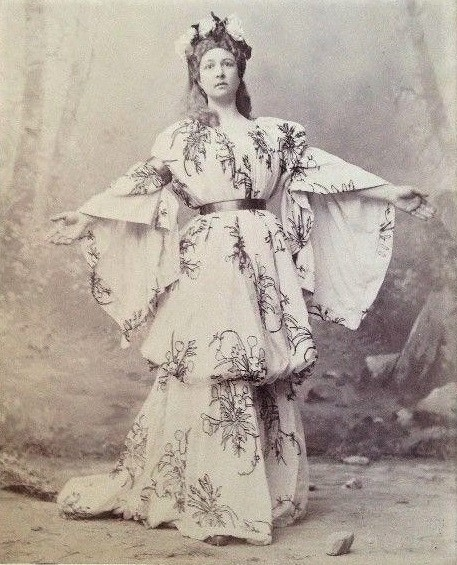
- Marion Weed as Freia in Das Rheingold Bayreuth Festival, 1899

Background information
- Birth name: Marion Sarah Weed
- Born: September 12, 1865; Rochester, New York
- Died: June 22, 1947 (aged 81); Rochester, New York
- Genres: Opera
- Occupations: Opera singer; voice teacher
- Instrument: Vocals

Marion Weed (September 12, 1865 in Rochester, New York – June 22, 1947 in Rochester, New York) was an internationally famous American opera singer (dramatic soprano) with lead roles in the Metropolitan Opera, the Cologne Opera, and the Hamburg Opera. She was the Dean of Women and a Dramatic Instructor at the University of Rochester's Eastman School of Music.

== Career ==
Weed wrote, "My only equipments for my future career were a good, natural contralto voice, an excellent piano and an inordinate love of song." She goes on to write in Hampton's Broadway Magazine that she started with the usual musical education with a mixed ability of teachers. When she was 16, she sang in the Rochester Central Church Ladies' quartette as a contralto and for two years received "excellent" training from the organist. In 1889, she auditioned for a New York Fifth Avenue church and was selected over 40 other competitors. When she was working in New York, she saw Lilli Lehmann as Isolde in Tristan und Isolde and that is when she "resolved to go abroad and study under Mme. Lehmann". She worked in New York for five years to save money for that goal. Before leaving for Germany, Weed sang "with charming effect a contralto aria from Freischütz" for the Metropolitan Opera's Grand Sunday Night Concert in 1894.

Marion Weed then went to Germany where she planned to be trained as a contralto for concerts by Lilli Lehmann, but Lehmann said she was a pure dramatic soprano and should prepare for the grand opera. Lehmann said, "Remain with me for three years and I will promise you a career." From 1896 to 1898 she received an engagement in Cologne. She debuted in 1896 as Donna Anna in Don Giovanni with "brilliant success" and in 1898 she performed Freia in Rheingold at the Bayreuth Festival. In 1898 she went to the Hamburg Opera. Her performance as a Circe in August Bungert's music drama Kirke deserves special mention, which undoubtedly owes a considerable part of its effect to her excellent performance (September 22, 1899).

In 1903, she came back to New York where she debuted at the Metropolitan Opera for the role of Brünnhilde in Die Walküre. During director Heinrich Conried years at the Met, "Miss Weed and Miss Fremstad and Messrs. Caruso and Goritz became fixtures in the institution." She sang Kundry in Parsifal, alternating with Milka Ternina, in America's first performances. This staging of the opera was not authorized by the Wagner family but the injunction against the production failed. Several years later, Weed was still boycotted and shunned at Bayreuth. On January 22, 1907, she was in the United States premiere, the special and only performance, of the controversial Salome in the role of Herodias. Further performances were banned and it was not performed again until 1934. By 1908 she sang Isolde in Tristan und Isolde, Venus in Tannhäuser, the mother in Hansel and Gretel and Orlovsky in Die Fledermaus, a total of five years from 17 operas in 70 performances. While the company was on tour in 1906, they survived the San Francisco Earthquake and were some of the first ones to personally report in New York about the tragedy.

In 1910, she again performed in the Hamburg Opera, this time as Isolde. She was engaged with a five-year contract with the Staatsoper Hannover. In 1914 while living in Berlin, but visiting Hamburg, World War I broke out. In an unsealed letter to her sister in Rochester, Weed wrote about how the husband of a couple whose marriage she sang at had died at the Battle of Liège. The music school next door set up its big hall with beds for wounded. She learned basic nursing skills to be a helper to the Red Cross nurses. She wrote, "We have all read about war, but it has seemed a part of history, dim and distant, and now when one experiences the sadness and depression and horror of it, it is too real. I awake every morning with a wish that it were all a dream, and then see all about me evidence of wretchedness." She also wrote about the transportation, communication and financial problems for the hundreds of stranded Americans and how she planned to travel back to Berlin.

After completing her international stage career, she returned to teach in her home town as the Dean of Women at the newly formed University of Rochester's Eastman School of Music and as a Dramatic Instructor in the Opera Department. She taught there from 1921 to 1937. One of the first graduates, Adelaide Fish Cumming (known as portraying Betty Crocker), fondly remembered her teaching stage deportment, "When it came time to learn stage falls, she demonstrated so realistically that the class shrieked in unison and ran to help her. She just laughed – not even dignity damaged." Mu Phi Epsilon awarded the Marion Weed Scholarship Prize to students, in memory of their beloved counselor of women students.
