= 80-string koto =

80-stringed variant of the Japanese koto zither

The 80-string koto, known as the hachijugen (八十絃/はちじゅうげん) in Japanese, was an invention of Japanese composer Michio Miyagi created in 1923. Miyagi added 67 strings to the traditional 13-string koto design, creating an instrument much like a western harp. Together, the 80 strings provide a far larger pitch range than the standard koto. It is widely seen as a short-lived experimental instrument.

== Construction ==
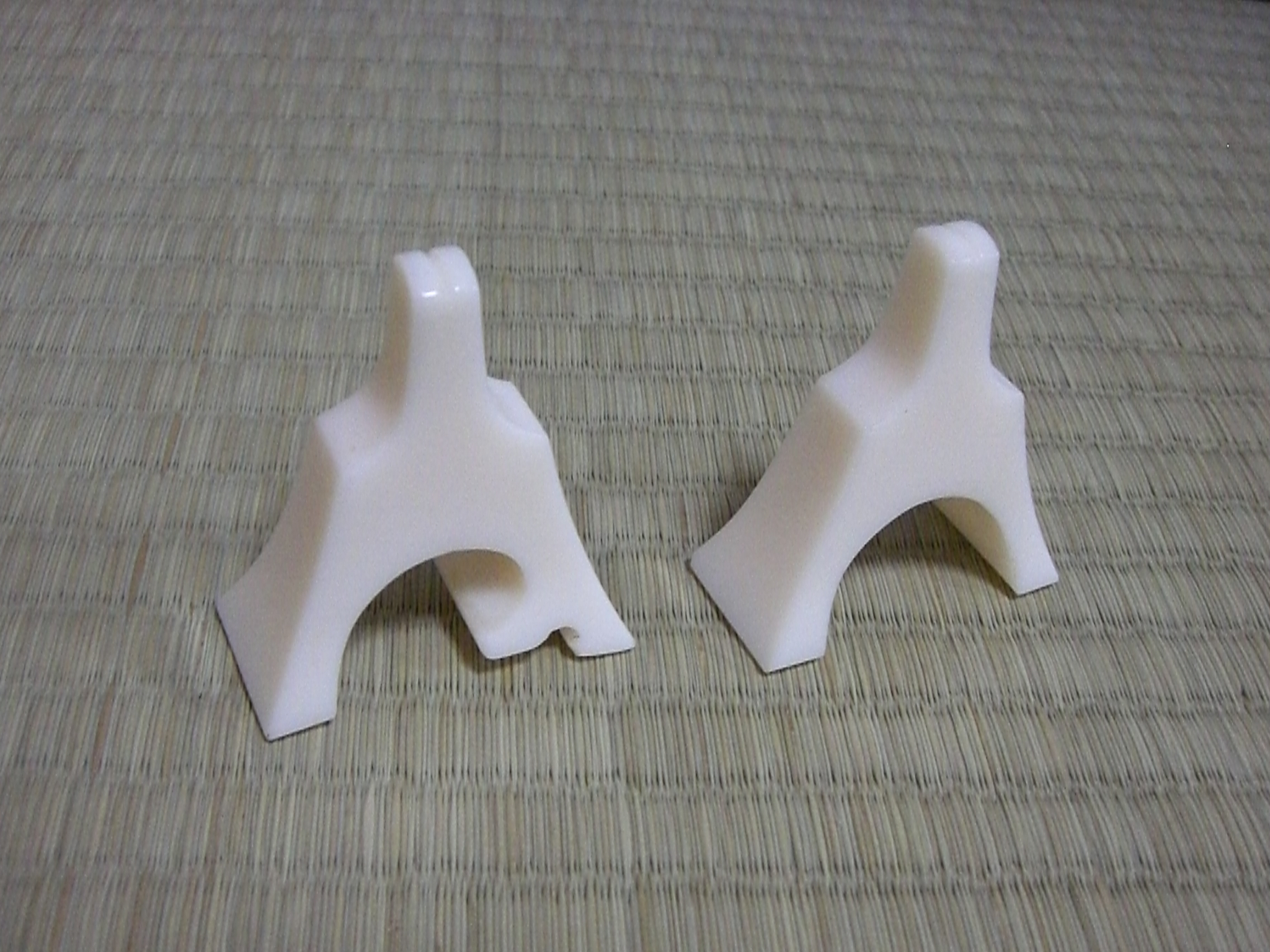
Jii (bridges)

The 80-string koto was largely hand-constructed, as only limited machinery existed to manufacture it. It was built along similar lines to the common koto, but with reinforced design elements; for instance, the platform where strings are tied runs the entire length and breadth of the instrument to accommodate the increased strain.

As with other koto, the Paulownia wood used for the instruments' body (Paulownia tomentosa, known as kiri in Japanese) is molded and treated. The bridges of the koto, known as jii, are often made of plastic in the modern day, and can be found in both small and large sizes. These bridges are rearranged as needed during playing, and are arranged according to the particular tuning used. Strings are traditionally made from silk threads, although plastic nylon strings are often used as a cheaper alternative.

=== Usage ===
The 80-string koto is not widely used. There are few extant examples of the instrument today, as it never achieved the popularity of the 17-string koto, Miyagi's more widely accepted invention.
