= St. Michael's Church Complex =

Historic church in Maryland, United States

- U.S. National Register of Historic Places
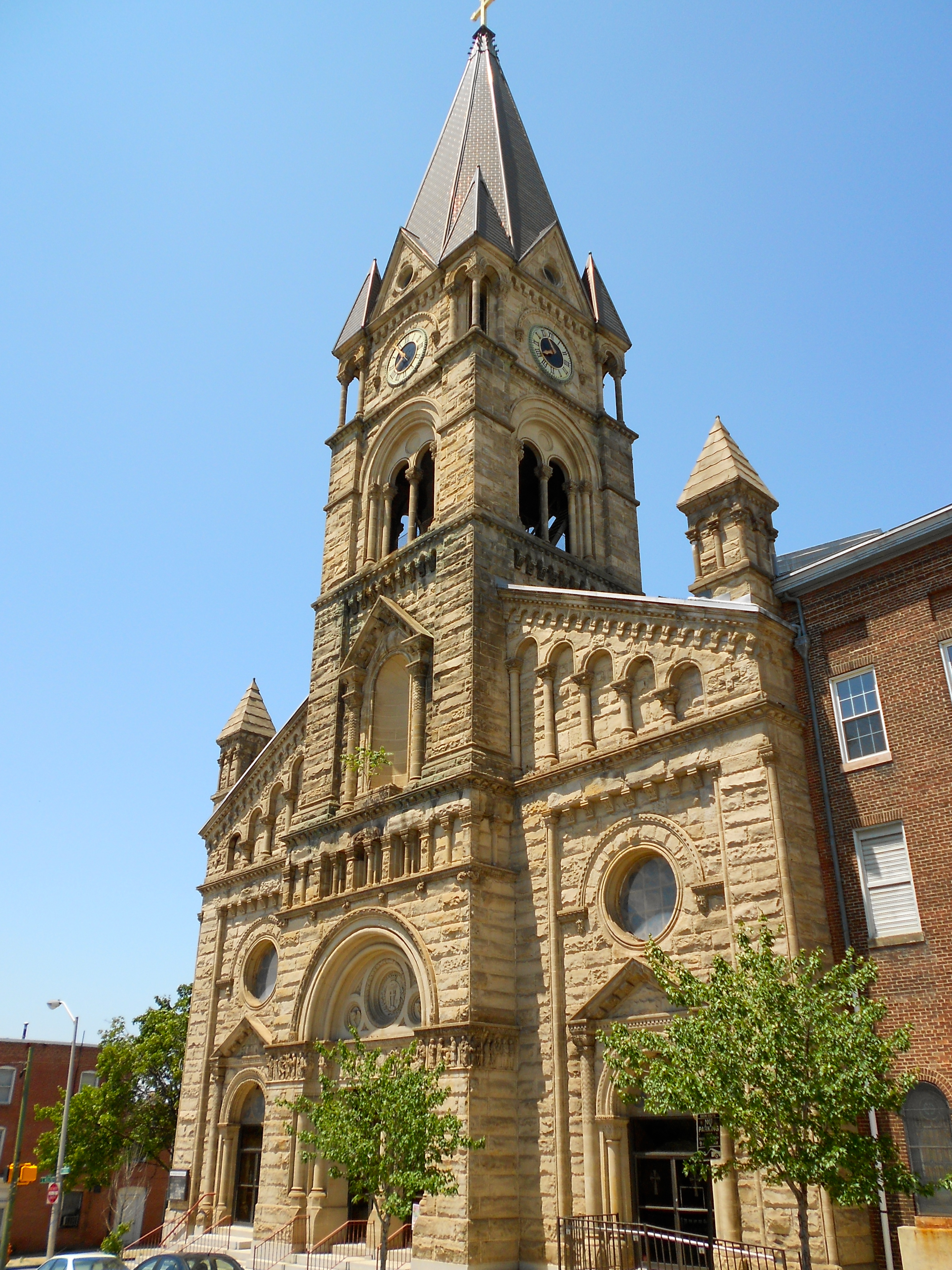
- St. Michael's Church, May 2012

- Location within Baltimore Location within Maryland Location within the United States
- Location: 1900-1920 E. Lombard St., Baltimore, Maryland
- Coordinates: 39°17′26″N 76°35′24″W
- Area: 1.5 acres (0.61 ha)
- Architect: Long, Louis L.; Davis, Frank E.
- Architectural style: Romanesque
- NRHP reference No.: 89000383
- Added to NRHP: May 17, 1989

St. Michael's Church Complex, also known as St. Michael the Archangel Roman Catholic Church, is a historic Roman Catholic church complex located at Baltimore, Maryland, United States. The church was founded to serve the German immigrant community in Baltimore. The church is a late 19th-century Romanesque Revival structure, 170 by 80 feet, with a steeple 180 feet high.

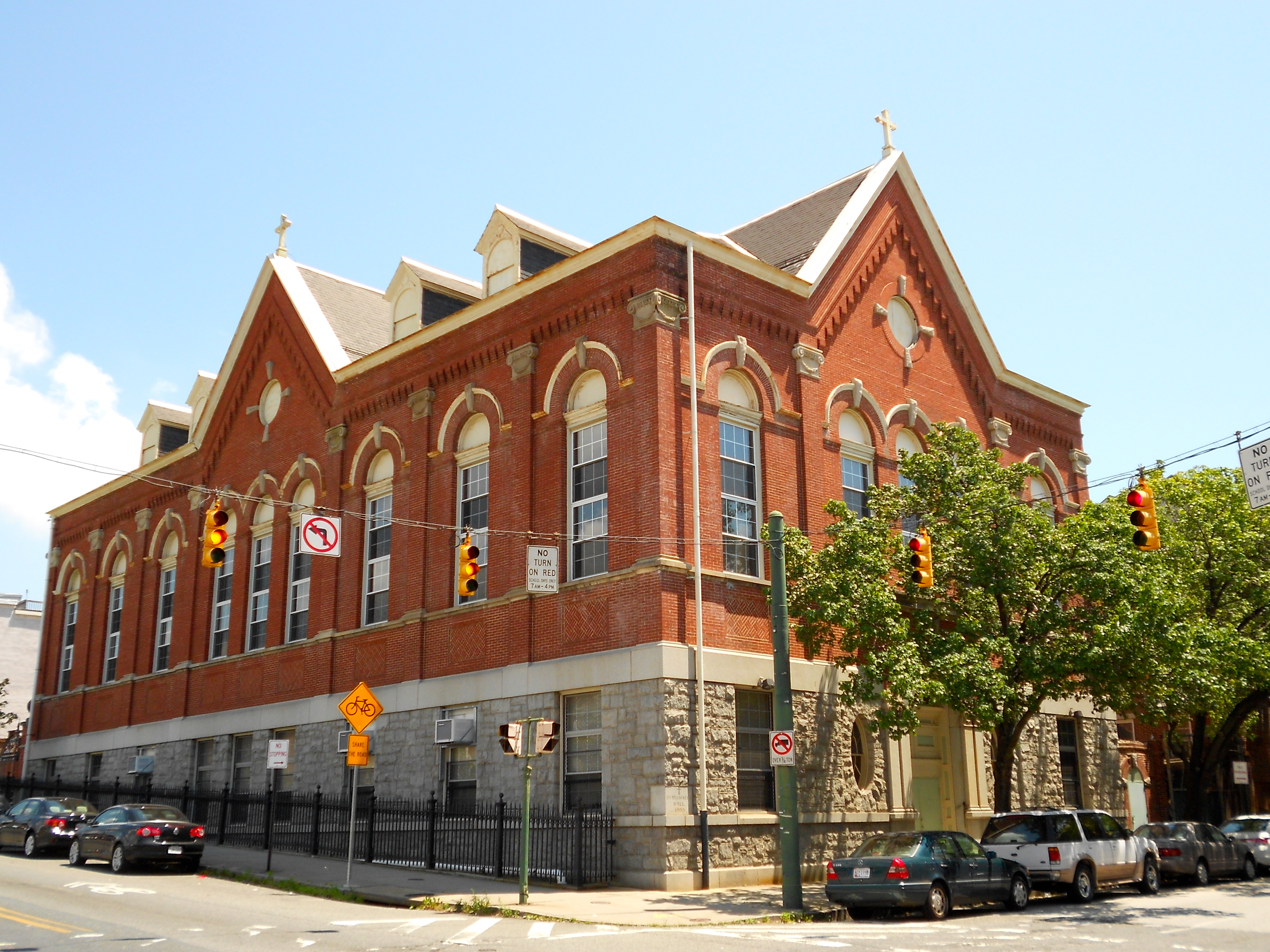
Parish Hall

The complex consists of seven main buildings: the Church, Girls’ School, Rectory, Boys’ School, Convent, Brothers’ Residence, and the Parish Hall. It was the oldest continuously operating Redemptorist Catholic church in Baltimore possessing the largest extant, completely intact Redemptorist complex remaining in the city.

St. Michael's Church Complex was listed on the National Register of Historic Places in 1989.

The church is currently a brewery called Ministry of Brewing. The former sanctuary holds brewing vessels for beer production.
