= John Cadvan Davies =

Welsh Methodist minister and poet (1846–1923)

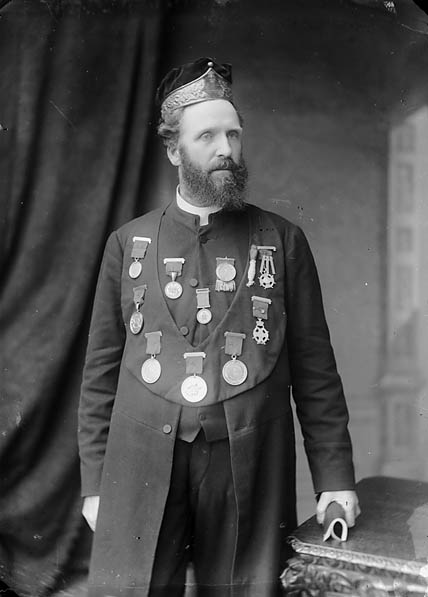
Portrait of Cadvan by John Thomas

John Cadvan Davies (1846–1923) was a Wesleyan Methodist Minister and a Welsh poet, who served as Archdruid. He is better known in Wales by his bardic name, Cadfan (sometimes Cadvan).

== Life and career ==
Cadvan was born on a small farm, Yr Allt, in the village of Llangadfan, Montgomeryshire (now Powys), on 1 October 1846, as the son of David and Jane Davies.

He joined the Wesleyan ministry in 1871 and worked in most of the North Wales circuits and in Liverpool. He was President of the Assembly in 1910. He was among the editors of the Wesleyan hymn-book of 1900, which includes several of his hymns. Others can be found in the publication Llyfr Emynau y Methodistiaid Calfinaidd a Wesleaidd of 1927. "Heroic" verses of his earned him prizes – at a national eisteddfod in Liverpool in 1884, in Caernarvon in 1886, and in London in 1887. He served as Archdruid in 1923.

Cadvan's publications were Caneuon Cadvan, i (1878), Caneuon Cadvan, ii (1883), Caneuon Cadvan, iii (1893), Dydd Coroniad (1894), Caneuon Cadvan, iv with Dydd Coroniad as a supplement (1897), and Atgof a Phrofiad, an autobiography, which appeared in the Eurgrawn in 1917.

== Family ==
Cadvan married twice, first to Maggie Jones, daughter of Hugh Jones, Ty'n y pwll, and Dinas Mawddwy, on 23 August 1876, in the Independent Chapel. His second wife was Mary Ada Evans, daughter of Meschach Evans, Manchester House, Leeswood, whom he married on 15 August 1882 in the Wesleyan Chapel of Mold.

John Cadvan Davies died at Oswestry on 12 October 1923.

== Notes ==
Preceded by Evan Rees	Archdruid of the National Eisteddfod of Wales; 1923	Succeeded by Howell Elvet Lewis
