= Octet (Stravinsky) =

1923 work for wind instruments

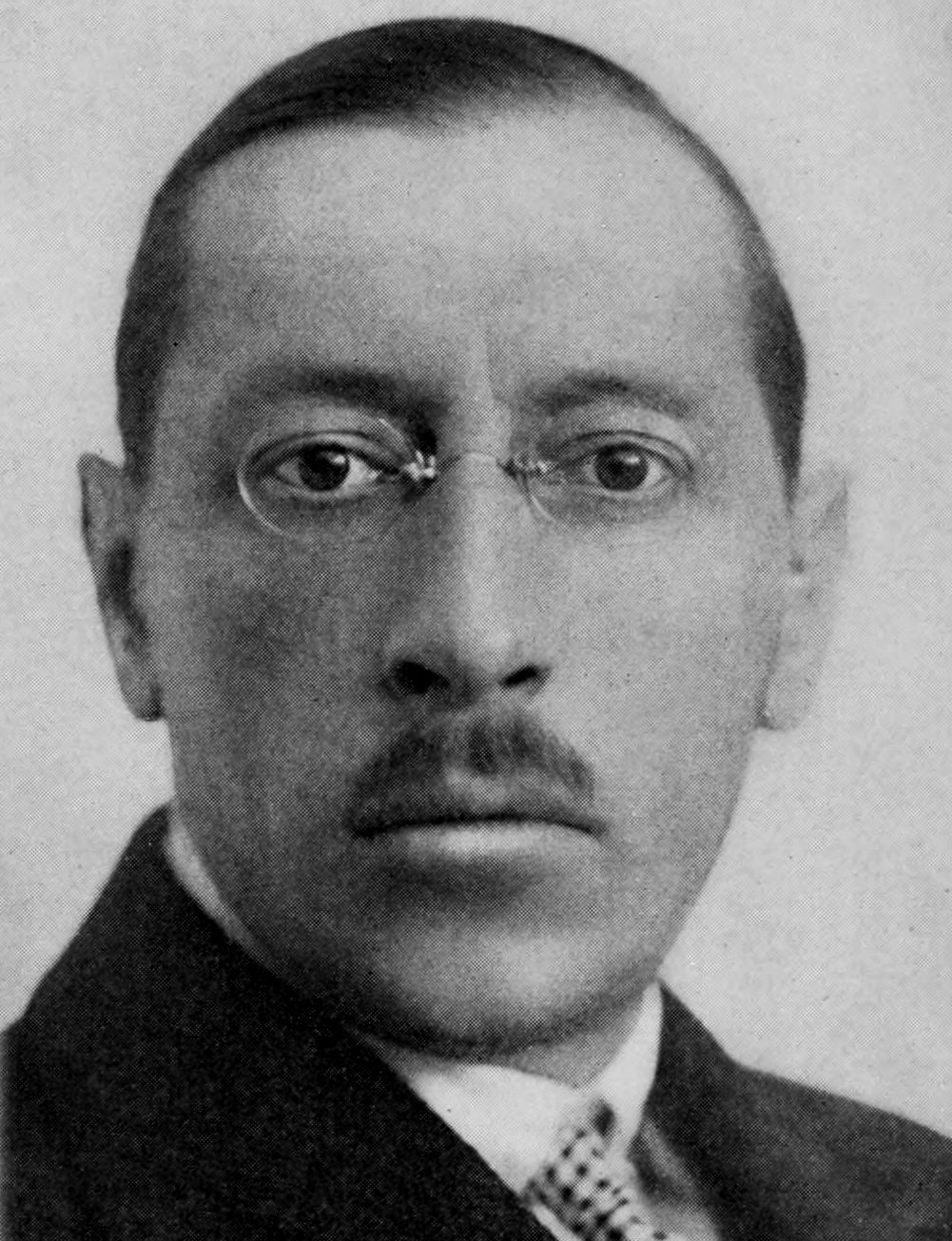
Stravinsky in 1921

The Octet for wind instruments is a chamber music composition by Igor Stravinsky, completed in 1923.

Stravinsky’s Octet is scored for an unusual combination of woodwind and brass instruments: flute, clarinet in B♭ and A, two bassoons, trumpet in C, trumpet in A, tenor trombone, and bass trombone. Because of its dry wind sonorities, divertimento character, and open and self-conscious adoption of "classical" forms of the German tradition (sonata, variation, fugue), as well as the fact that the composer published an article asserting his formalist ideas about it shortly after the Octet's first performance, it has been generally regarded as the beginning of neoclassicism in Stravinsky's music, even though his opera Mavra (1921–22) already displayed most of the traits associated with this phase of his career (Walsh 2001, §5).

== History ==
According to Stravinsky, he composed the Octet fairly rapidly in 1922. After completing the first movement, he composed the waltz that would become the fourth variation of the middle movement. Only after composing this waltz did the idea come to him that it might be a good subject for a variation movement. The seventh variation, a fugato, especially pleased Stravinsky, and the following third movement grew out of this final variation (Stravinsky and Craft 1963, 71). One biographer concludes that Stravinsky began composing the Octet after returning from Germany to Biarritz late in the autumn of 1922, and completed the score on 20 May 1923.

However, the sketch materials reveal a more complex chronology. Twelve measures of what would become the waltz variation were composed in 1919, and the fugato variation was the first complete section to be composed, in January 1921. There is an early five-page draft of uncertain date for the beginning of the Allegro section in the first movement, at that time planned for piano and wind orchestra. The main segments of the first movement were drafted in sketches dated between 12 July and 8 August, and the full score of the movement was completed on 16 August 1922. Two days later, Stravinsky began work on the second movement by adding the previously composed fugato, and then the waltz fragment, slightly expanded. The waltz coincidentally contains the same intervals as the opening of the fugato, and on 23 August 1922, he created the theme and titled the movement "Thème avec variations monométriques". Variation D was begun next, but work was interrupted and Stravinsky finished it only on 18 November, followed by the "ribbons of scales" variation A on 1 December, variation B on 6 December, and variation C on 9 December. The Finale was completed in Paris on 20 May 1923. The score was revised by the composer in 1952.

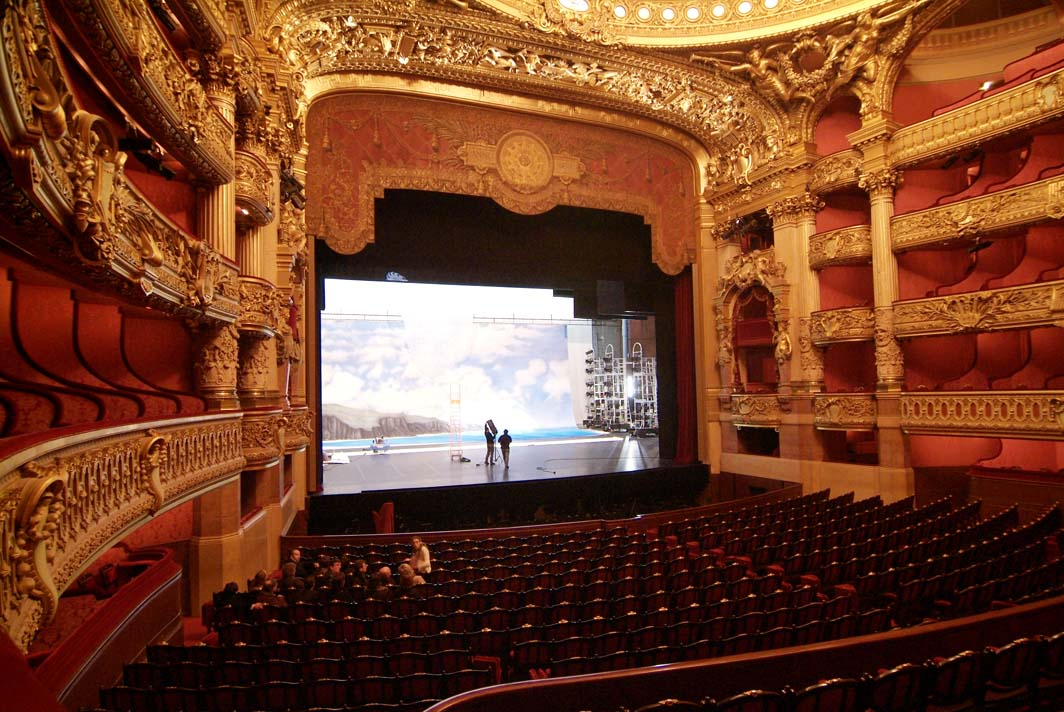
Stage of the Paris Opera, where Stravinsky conducted the premiere of the Octet in 1923

The published score does not carry a dedication, though Stravinsky said it was dedicated to Vera de Bosset.

Stravinsky himself conducted the premiere of the Octet on one of Serge Koussevitzky's concerts at the Paris Opera House on 18 October 1923. This was the first time he had conducted a premiere of a new piece, though not the first time he had conducted his music in public. The cavernous space cannot have been ideal for presenting such a chamber-music work, but Stravinsky later expressed satisfaction with the balance of the sound at that performance.

The very first recording that Stravinsky made was of the Octet: a private recording, probably made for his own study purposes, which is now lost.

== Form ==
Linear counterpoint from the Octet.

The Octet is in three movements:

1. Sinfonia (Lento – Allegro moderato)
2. Tema con variazioni (Andantino)
3. Finale (Sempre = 116, Tempo giusto)

The thematic and rhythmic materials of the three movements are interrelated, and the second movement connects to the third without a break.

=== I. Sinfonia ===
The opening Sinfonia is a comparatively rare example (despite his label of "neoclassical composer") of Stravinsky's use of sonata form. His employment of this form, along with the other style elements consciously borrowed from the past, is not out of a reverent desire to perpetuate them, but rather constitutes a defiant and satirical act of mockery. The opening Lento section functions like a classical introduction, presenting the background tonal structure that will also govern the main Allegro section.

In the Allegro, Stravinsky exploits the apparent contradiction of two formal balances: one created through the parallel restatement of themes, the other through the symmetrical arrangement of themes and events on different structural layers of the composition.

=== II. Tema con variazioni ===
In 1922, when Stravinsky was composing the second, theme-and-variations movement, he confided in a letter to Ernest Ansermet that Mozart was for him what Ingres was to Picasso. The hybrid of rondo and variation form resembles the slow movement of Mozart's E♭ major Piano Concerto, K. 482, to which it has been compared. Variations 1, 3, and 6 are practically identical (all are labeled "variation A" in the score), and serve as introductions to the following variations 2, 4, and 7. Stravinsky referred to this recurring introduction as the "ribbons of scales" variation. The second, fourth, fifth, and seventh variations assume the characters of a march, a waltz, a can-can, and a solemn fugue, respectively. The fugato is almost uniformly written in 5/8 time. This seventh, final variation is particularly surprising. The theme here is scarcely recognizable, and does not seem promising as the subject for a fugue; the sound character of the variation, with its emphasis on slow-moving harmonic masses, is unearthly, and its plan is unconventional, with the subject occurring only four times.

=== III. Finale ===
The finale's material is based on a rhythm identified by Stravinsky in earlier works (such as The Firebird and The Rite of Spring) with the Russian circle-dance called a khorovod. This repeating, three-note syncopated rhythm with proportions 3:3:2 (. .) is especially evident in the accompanying chords at the end, but all the preceding material in the movement is built on it or contains it. The overall formal design may be represented as A–B–A′–C–A″–D–D′, where the refrain material in the A sections occurs one time fewer in each successive repetition: three times, then two times, and finally just once. In this process, the khorovod-like element becomes progressively less evident in the refrain, whereas in the intervening couplets it increases in clarity, from a disguised augmentation in the solo trumpet in section B, to a flute solo built on the original rhythmic shape in C, to the chordal accompaniment in D. The conception of a round dance is transformed here into an instrumental rondo, with a main theme resembling a baroque fugue subject.

== Reception ==
Aaron Copland witnessed the world premiere in Paris, and reported the general dismay at the abrupt, inexplicable turn away from Stravinsky's well-established neo-primitivist Russian style, to what appeared to everyone as "a mess of 18th-century mannerisms". The press, too, was unanimous in condemning what seemed like a bad joke. From a perspective of several decades later, of course, it had become clear that Stravinsky was embarking on a new and important stylistic phase that was destined to influence composers everywhere by bringing out a latent objectivist tendency in the music of the period, by openly reverting to the ideals, forms, and textures of the pre-Romantic era.

Not all of the early reviewers took a negative view, however. When the Octet was performed at the Salzburg Festival in 1924, by instrumentalists from Frankfurt conducted by Hermann Scherchen, an anonymous reviewer in the Times declared that, "without claiming for it, after the manner of the composer's more violent admirers, that it is a seventh Brandenburg Concerto", it displayed "a complete mastery of the medium", as well as a sure sense of form and "an ingenuity in counterpoint" with its own laws. Though finding moments of unaccustomed discords preventing acceptance of the music as "beautiful", this critic concluded that "there is so much to admire in the work that it cannot be dismissed as a piece of buffoonery".
