= Yes! We Have No Bananas =

1923 novelty song by Frank Silver and Irving Cohn

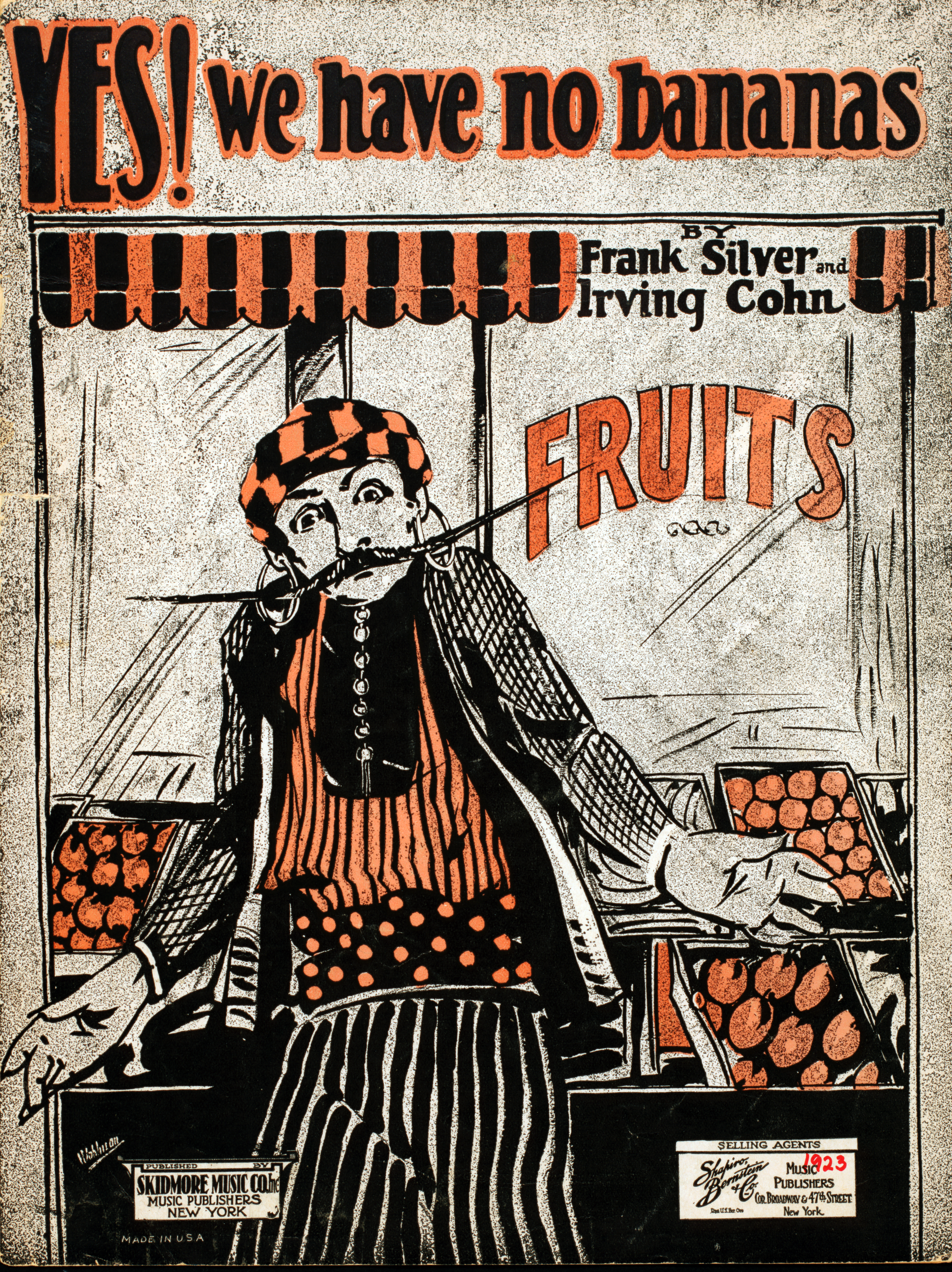
- Sheet music cover, 1923

Song
- Published: March 23, 1923
- Songwriters: Frank Silver; Irving Cohn

"Yes! We Have No Bananas" is an American novelty song by Frank Silver and Irving Cohn published March 23, 1923. It placed at No. 1 for five weeks after it was recorded by Billy Jones, Billy Murray, Arthur Hall, Snoopy's Classiks on Toys, Irving Kaufman, and others. It was recorded later by Benny Goodman and His Orchestra, Spike Jones & His City Slickers, Louis Prima, Kidsongs, and many more.

== History ==
In 1923, Frank Silver told Time: "I am an American, of Jewish ancestry, with a wife and a young son. About a year ago my little orchestra was playing at a Long Island hotel. To and from the hotel I would stop at a fruit stand owned by a Greek, who began every sentence with 'yes'. The jingle of his idiom haunted me and my friend Cohn. Finally I wrote this verse and Cohn fitted it with a tune." The shopkeeper who inspired the song may have been one of the many affected by a worldwide decline in the banana crop caused by Panama disease.

== Legacy ==
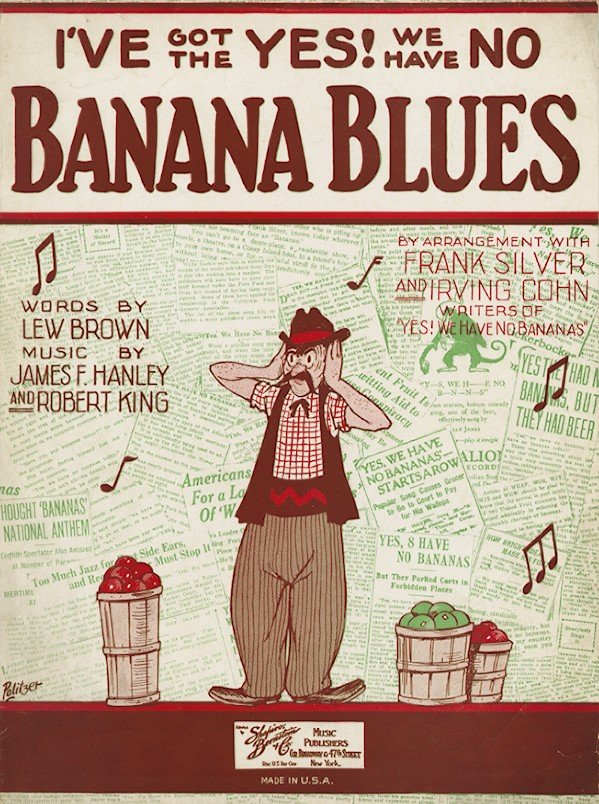
Its 1923 parody, "I've Got the Yes, We Have No Banana Blues"

=== Parody ===
Its success inspired a parody, "I've Got the Yes! We Have No Banana Blues", first recorded by Billy Jones and Sam Lanin (with vocals by Irving Kaufman and others) in 1923. The song describes the protagonist's frustration with weeks of hearing the original song performed in cabarets and shows.

During Eddie Cantor's July 1923 rendition of the parody, he exclaims, "Stop!" to interrupt a quartet singing the original song and threatens to call a cop on them, because he just "can't take it any longer". Belle Baker performed the parody in August 1923. Al Jolson recorded a mock-operatic version, in blackface, in the 1930 film Mammy. The Three Stooges used the song title as a parody for the 1939 short Yes, We Have No Bonanza.

=== Other uses ===
The song was the theme of the outdoor relief protests in Belfast in 1932. These were a unique example of Protestants and Catholics in Northern Ireland protesting together, and the song was used because it was one of the few non-sectarian songs widely known in both communities. The song lent its title to a book about the depression in Belfast. The Banana Block in East Belfast also references this song in the building's history.

Billy Jones's rendition of "Yes! We Have No Bananas"

"Yes! We Have No Bananas" performed by Eddie Furman and William Nash

The term has been resurrected on many occasions, including during rationing in the United Kingdom in World War II, when the British government banned imports of bananas for five years. Shop owners put signs stating "Yes, we have no bananas" in their shop windows in keeping with the war spirit.

Musicological entertainer Sigmund Spaeth, in one of his most popular numbers, "dissected" the melody into its component parts — the "Hallelujah Chorus" from Handel's Messiah, "My Bonnie Lies Over The Ocean," "I Dreamt I Dwelt in Marble Halls," "Aunt Dinah's Quilting Party," and Cole Porter's "An Old-Fashioned Garden." Replacing the original lyrics with the appropriate melodic phrases, said Spaeth, the song becomes:

Hallelujah, Bananas! Oh, bring back my Bonnie to me.
I dreamt that I dwelt in marble halls—the kind that you seldom see.
I was seeing Nellie home, to an old-fashioned garden: but,
Hallelujah, Bananas! Oh, bring back my Bonnie to me!

In the 1970s and 1980s, the American airline Hughes Airwest used an advertising jingle, "Yes! We are Top Banana", set to the tune of "Yes! We Have No Bananas". The ads referred to the airline's bright yellow airplanes and its slogan, "Top Banana in the West". On January 1, 2019, the song's sheet music entered the public domain in the United States. In 2024, the 1923 recordings entered the public domain in the United States.

== See also ==
- Okeh Laughing Record, an influential 1922 novelty record
