= Frank Silver =

American songwriter, drummer (1892–1960)

Frank Silverstadt (September 8, 1892 – June 14, 1960), better known by his stage name Frank Silver, was an American songwriter, jazz drummer and vaudeville performer. He was best known for co-writing and co-composing the popular song "Yes! We Have No Bananas" in 1923 with Irving Cohn. He wrote at least 75 songs in his career.

Born in Boston, Silver grew up on the lower East Side of Manhattan. He began playing drums in a Bowery music hall's orchestra when he was 15.

Early in Silver's career, he conducted orchestras in vaudeville houses and was a drummer in Loew's Metropolitan Theatre's orchestra. After those jobs, he toured with his own 12-piece band, playing one-night stands. He also performed with the Hitchy-Koo traveling revue of Raymond Hitchcock and worked at the Brooklyn Academy of Music.

Other songs that Silver wrote included "Icky Wicky Woo" and "What Do We Get from Boston? (Beans, Beans, Beans)".

Silver was married twice, Dora Silverstadt (born Mandelbaum) and had two sons, Robert and Arthur; Victoria Silverstadt (born Martinkus) and had a son, Frank.

On June 14, 1960, Silver died of a cerebral hemorrhage in Brooklyn Jewish Hospital at age 67.
