= Irving Cohn =

British-American songwriter (1898–1961)

Irving Cohn (21 February 1898 – 12 July 1961) was a British-American songwriter, best known for "Yes! We Have No Bananas", which he co-wrote with Frank Silver in 1923. He is sometimes credited as Irving Conn.

Cohn was born in London on 21 February 1898. He died in Fort Lee, New Jersey, in the United States, on 12 July 1961 at the age of 63.
