= Film promotion =

Practice of promotion specifically in the film industry

Film promotion is the practice of promotion specifically in the film industry, and usually occurs in coordination with the process of film distribution. Film promotion generally includes press releases, advertising campaigns, merchandising, franchising, media, and interviews with the key people involved in making the film, such as the film's actors and directors. Interviews often take pace during what is called the press junket or film junket. This process is an important part of any release because of the inherent high financial risk; film studios will invest in expensive marketing campaigns to maximize revenue early in the release cycle. Marketing budgets tend to equal about half the production budget. Publicity is generally handled by the distributor and exhibitors.

== Techniques ==
=== In theaters/cinemas ===
Trailers, Teaser are a mainstay of film promotion because they are delivered directly to movie-goers. These trailers are presented to the public at a movie theater or on the television at home. Generally, they tell the story of the movie in a highly condensed fashion, compressing maximum appeal into two and a half minutes.

- Film posters
- Slideshows - stills, trivia, and trivia games from the film shown between movie showtimes.
- Standees (freestanding paperboard life-size images of figures from the film)
- Cardboard 3D displays, sometimes producing sound
- Gimmicks that enhance the viewing experience by incorporating unusual or novel elements into otherwise regular films. Such gimmicks can include live effects and performances that correspond to in-film events, scratch-and-sniff cards, and various levels of interactivity.

=== Television and radio ===
- Hollywood movie distributors spend about $4 billion a year to buy paid advertising (30-second TV commercials, magazine/newspaper ads, etc.) and over half that total is placed on broadcast and cable TV, which are the main vehicles for advertising movies to audiences. TV is effective because it is an audio-visual medium – like film – and can deliver a vast audience quickly, which is crucial because films typically don’t linger in theaters for more than 4–6 weeks, according to Marketing to Moviegoers: Second Edition.
- Product placement: paid active or passive insertion (as on-set posters, and action figures) of film branding in drama or sitcom shows, or as passing mentions in dialogue. For example, 20th Century Fox commissioned an I, Robot-themed motorcycle, featured on two episodes (2:17, 2:18) of American Chopper. The film Memoirs of a Geisha was placed throughout an episode of the TV show Medium.
- Extended placement: full episodes of television talk shows (Oprah), entertainment news programs (ET), or network news programs (20/20), devoted to compensated exposure of the film, stars, clips, director, etc.
  - In addition, interviews with actors and directors, which are filmed in series at a hotel with local and national entertainment reporters, are featured on local news shows, programs on cable networks, and series such as Byron Allen's series of entertainment series like Entertainment Studios.
- Production and paid broadcast of behind-the-scenes documentary-style shows, the type of which are mainly produced for HBO, Showtime, and Starz
- Advance trailers, longer previews, or behind-the-scenes footage on streaming media and Blu-ray/DVDs

=== Internet ===
- Virtual relationship hyperlink marketing, wherein a major search engine (like Yahoo or Bing's main page) offers articles seemingly presenting interesting news-related items, but which are actually back-end loaded with a links page containing multiple "mental references" to film characters, storylines, or products. Example: Bond, Transformers, etc..., are connected to scientific invention news stories about advanced weaponry or robotics discoveries, which quickly leads the reader to pages loaded with the latest 007 or Megatron movie clip or art director's fantastical ideas and designs, thus hooking readers with a "bait and switch" story.
- Creation of standalone studio-sponsored websites specific to a given film.
- Online digital film screeners: screeners streamed over the Internet allow studios to send individually controlled copies of their films to various recipients with different expiry dates as a security measure against unauthorized distribution.
- Viral marketing: free distribution of trailers on movie-oriented websites and video user-generated content websites, and rapid dissemination of links to this content by email and blogs. Includes alleged leakage of supposed "rushes" and "early trailers" of film scenes. Sometimes, the efforts go further such as in the lead time to the successful premiere of the film, The Muppets which was preceded by several original shorts on YouTube over a number of years while the film was in production.
- Creation of Internet marketing campaigns using paid advertisement and social media marketing.

=== Print ===
- Paid advertisement in newspapers, magazines, and inserts in books.
- Cross-promotion of original book or novelization, including special printings, or new cover jackets ("Now a major motion picture.")
- Comic special editions or special episodes

=== Merchandising ===
- Paid co-branding (Eragon in American Chopper-two episodes), or co-advertising (Aston Martin and James Bond films) of a product with the film
- Promotional giveaways: branded drink cups, toys, or food combinations at fast food chains
- Building a life-sized Barbie Dreamhouse that people can rent for stays on Airbnb

=== Promotional tours and interviews ===
Film actors, directors, and producers appear for television, cable, radio, print, and online media interviews, which can be conducted in person or remotely. During film production, these can take place on set. After the film's premiere, key personnel make appearances in major market cities or participate remotely via satellite videoconference or telephone. The purpose of interviews is to encourage journalists to publish stories about their "exclusive interviews" with the film's stars, thereby creating "marketing buzz" around the film and stimulating audience interest in watching the film.

When it comes to feature films picked up by a major film studio for international distribution, promotional tours are a busy time for filmmakers. Key cast and crew are often contracted to travel to several major cities around the world to promote the film and sit for a number of interviews. In interviews, they are expected to stay "on message" by energetically expressing their enthusiasm for the film in a way that appears candid, fun, and fresh. They are expected to disclose just enough behind-the-scenes information about the film making process or the filmmakers' artistic vision to make each journalist feel like they got a nice scoop, while at the same time tactfully avoiding disclosure of anything embarrassing, humiliating, or truly negative that may be detrimental to the film's box office gross and profit or influence a critic's review as well as the public's opinion.

=== Audience research ===
There are seven distinct types of research conducted by film distributors in connection with domestic theatrical releases, according to "Marketing to Moviegoers: Second Edition." Such audience research can cost $1 million per film, especially when scores of TV advertisements are tested and re-tested. The bulk of research is done by major studios for the roughly 170 major releases they mount each year that are supported by tens of millions of advertising buys for each film. Independent film distributors, which typically spend less than $10 million in media buys per film, don't have the budget or breadth of advertising materials to analyze, so they spend little or nothing on pre-release audience research.

When audience research is conducted for domestic theatrical release, it involves these areas:

- Positioning studies versus other films that will premiere at the same time.
- Test screenings of finished or nearly finished films; this is the most well-known.
- Testing of audience response to advertising materials.
- Tracking surveys of audience awareness of a film starting six weeks before premiere.
- Exit surveys questioning filmgoers about their demographic makeup and the effectiveness of marketing.
- Title testing in an early stage.
- Concept testing that would occur in the development phase of a film before it is produced.

Marketing can play a big role in whether or not a film gets the green light. Audience research is a strong factor in determining the ability of a film to sell in theaters, which is ultimately how films make their money. As part of a movie's marketing strategy, audience research comes into account as producers create promotional materials. These promotional materials consistently change and evolve as a direct consequence of audience research up until the film opens in theaters.

IBIS made a study with information using 97% of America's economy regarding the market size of movie and Video production. They calculated that the United States market size, measured by revenue of the Movie & Video Production industry, is $18.2bn in 2022.

== See also ==
- Film budgeting
- Junket Whore, 1998 documentary
