= Girls Demand Excitement =

1931 film

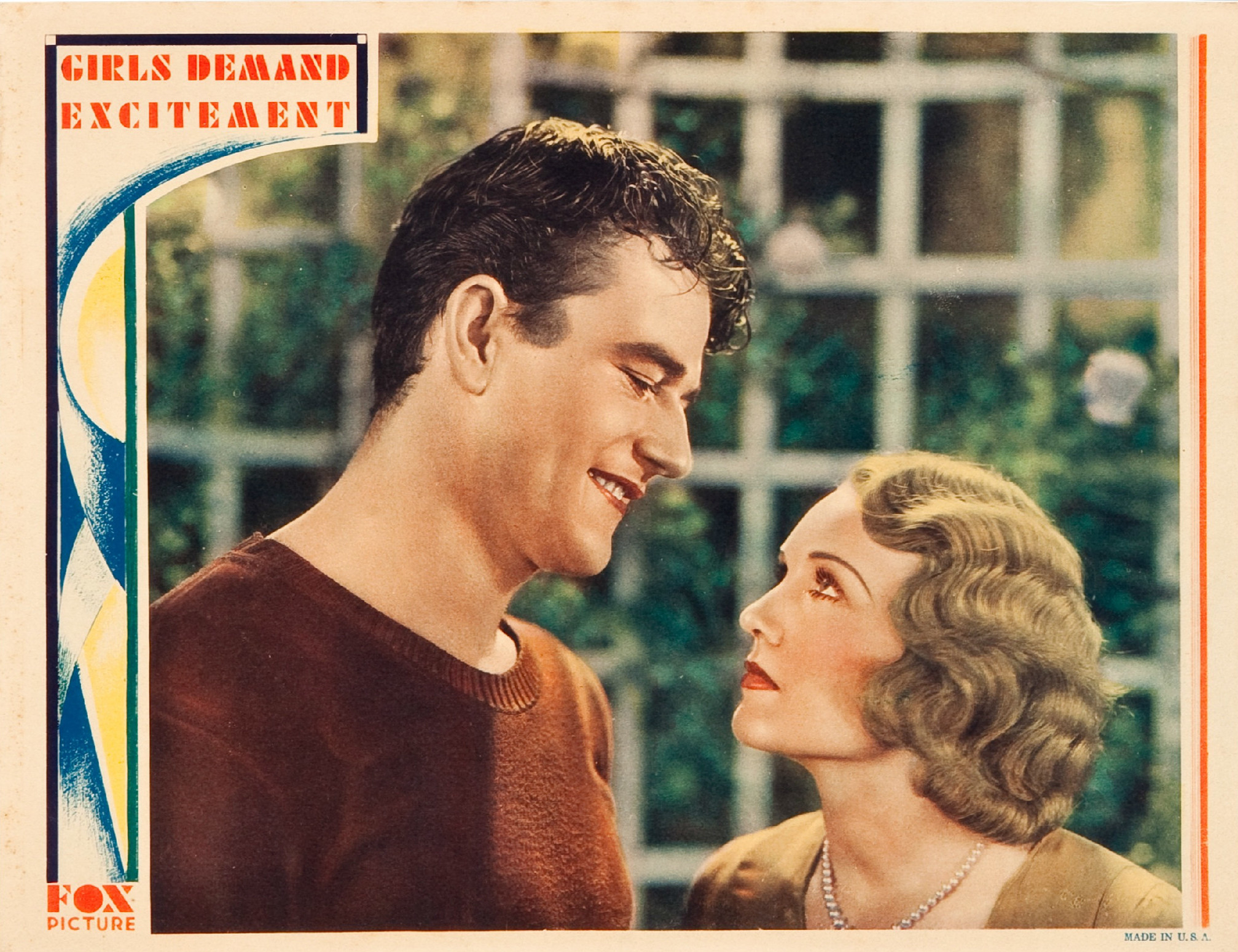
- Lobby card
- Directed by: Seymour Felix
- Written by: Harlan Thompson
- Starring: John Wayne; Virginia Cherrill; Marguerite Churchill
- Cinematography: Charles G. Clarke
- Edited by: Jack Murray
- Distributed by: Fox Film Corporation
- Release date: 1931
- Running time: 65 minutes
- Country: United States
- Language: English

Girls Demand Excitement is a 1931 American pre-Code film starring Virginia Cherrill, John Wayne, and Marguerite Churchill. Wayne and Churchill had starred in the widescreen Western epic The Big Trail the previous year. The movie was written by Harlan Thompson and directed by Seymour Felix. Wayne stated this film was the worst movie he ever appeared in. A 35mm nitrate work print of this film is stored in the UCLA Film and Television Archive.

== Plot ==
Peter Brooks is a hard-working but struggling college boy who resents girls being allowed to attend college. A wealthy young spoiled socialite named Joan Madison changes his mind when she uses her feminine wiles to entrap him. Later in the film, Brooks's men's basketball team goes up against the college's all-girl team.

== Cast ==
- Virginia Cherrill as Joan Madison
- John Wayne as Peter Brooks
- Marguerite Churchill as Miriam
- Marion Byron as Margery
- Ray Cooke as Jimmie
- Helen Jerome Eddy as Gazella Perkins
- Winter Hall as The Dean
- George Irving as Mr. Madison
- William Janney as Freddie
- Jerry Mandy as Joe
- Addie McPhail as Sue Street
- Edward J. Nugent as Tommy
- Martha Sleeper as Harriet Mundy
- Emerson Treacy as Bobby Cruikshank

== See also ==
- John Wayne filmography
