= He Couldn't Take It =

1933 film

- Directed by: William Nigh
- Written by: Dore Schary; George Waggner
- Produced by: William T. Lackey; Trem Carr
- Starring: Ray Walker; Virginia Cherrill; George E. Stone
- Cinematography: George McKenzie
- Edited by: Jack Ogilvie
- Production company: William T. Lackey Productions
- Distributed by: Monogram Pictures
- Release date: August 13, 1933
- Running time: 65 minutes
- Country: United States
- Language: English

He Couldn't Take It is a 1933 American comedy film directed by William Nigh and starring Ray Walker, Virginia Cherrill and George E. Stone. The script was written by Dore Schary and George Waggner and was made for Monogram Pictures.

== Plot ==
The film follows Jimmy Kelly, a hot-tempered man who struggles to keep a steady job. He eventually finds work as a process server, where one assignment leads him to serve legal papers on a gangster and uncover a criminal conspiracy. At the same time, Jimmy tries to prevent his long-suffering girlfriend from going on vacation with her flirtatious employer.

== Cast ==
- Ray Walker as Jimmy Case
- Virginia Cherrill as Eleanor Rogers
- George E. Stone as Sammy Kohn
- Stanley Fields as Sweet Sue
- Dorothy Granger as Grace Clarice
- Jane Darwell as Mrs. Case
- Paul Porcasi as Nick
- Don Douglas as Oakley
- Astrid Allwyn as Blonde
- Franklin Parker as Radio Announcer
- Jack Kennedy as Driscoll
- Ed Brady as Passenger
- George Cleveland as Drunk
- Olaf Hytten as Professor Brewster Stevens
- Florence Turner as Elderly Lady

== Bibliography ==
- Alan G. Fetrow. Sound films, 1927-1939: a United States filmography. McFarland, 1992.
