= What Price Crime =

1935 film directed by Albert Herman

- Directed by: Albert Herman
- Written by: Al Martin
- Produced by: Max Alexander; Peter E. Kassler
- Starring: Charles Starrett; Noel Madison; Virginia Cherrill
- Cinematography: Harry Forbes
- Edited by: S. Roy Luby
- Production company: Beacon Productions
- Distributed by: First Division Pictures; Majestic Pictures
- Release date: May 28, 1935
- Running time: 63 minutes
- Country: United States
- Language: English

What Price Crime or What Price Crime? is a 1935 American crime film directed by Albert Herman and starring Charles Starrett, Noel Madison and Virginia Cherrill.

== Cast ==
- Charles Starrett as Allen Grey
- Noel Madison as Douglas Worthington
- Virginia Cherrill as Sandra Worthington
- Charles Delaney as Armstrong
- Jack Mulhall as Hopkins
- Nina Guilbert as Mrs. Worthington
- Henry Roquemore as Peter Crenshaw
- Gordon Griffith as Red - a Gangster
- John Elliott as Chief Radcliff
- Arthur Loft as Donahue
- Earl Tree as Graham
- John Cowell as Davis
- Edwin Argus as Lefty
- Al Baffert as Battling Brennan

== Bibliography ==
- Pitts, Michael R. Poverty Row Studios, 1929–1940: An Illustrated History of 55 Independent Film Companies, with a Filmography for Each. McFarland & Company, 2005.
