= Fast Workers =

1933 film by Tod Browning

- PLAY trailer; runtime 00:02:10
- Directed by: Tod Browning (uncredited)
- Written by: Karl Brown (continuity); Ralph Wheelwright (continuity); Laurence Stallings (dialogue)
- Based on: Rivets unpublished play by John McDermott
- Produced by: Tod Browning
- Starring: John Gilbert; Robert Armstrong; Mae Clarke
- Cinematography: Peveral Marley
- Edited by: Ben Lewis
- Production company: Metro-Goldwyn-Mayer
- Distributed by: Metro-Goldwyn-Mayer
- Release date: March 10, 1933
- Running time: 66 minutes
- Country: United States
- Language: English
- Budget: $525,000

Fast Workers, also known as Rivets, is a 1933 pre-Code comedy-drama film starring John Gilbert and Robert Armstrong as construction workers and romantic rivals for the character played by Mae Clarke. The film, which is based on the unproduced play Rivets by John McDermott, was directed by an uncredited Tod Browning. The supporting cast features Virginia Cherrill and Sterling Holloway.

== Plot ==
Fast Workers is set in the early 1930s, in the time of the film's release. It portrays the freewheeling lives and romantic escapades of two friends who work as riveters on high-rise construction projects. Gunner Smith is a rake who loves women but hates the notion of emotionally committing to any of his romantic conquests. His close friend Bucker Reilly, however, is just the opposite, often losing his heart to the various "dames" he meets and quickly becoming entangled with them. Gunner therefore sees it as his ongoing duty as a pal to save Bucker from rushing headlong to the altar. True to form, Bucker one evening after work meets and becomes enamored with Mary, not knowing that she is one of the women whom Gunner dates regularly, although not seriously. He is also unaware that Mary generally supports herself by fleecing men of their money. Once she learns that Bucker has a nest egg of $5,000 in the bank, she accepts his rather clumsy marriage proposal. Gunner soon learns of his friend's engagement, but he waits too long to scuttle the marriage plans. By the time he reveals to Bucker his own involvement with Mary, Bucker has already married her.

Bucker's anger builds over his perceived betrayal, and the next day while working at their construction site, he tries to kill his friend by sabotaging a walkway between two iron girders. As a result, Gunner falls, is seriously injured, and is given little chance to live. Wracked with guilt, Bucker tells Mary what he has done. She is furious. She tells him their brief marriage is over and that if Gunner dies she will make sure he is convicted of murder and is executed. She then openly admits her feelings for Gunner, as well as to her wanton past.

By the time Mary and Bucker arrive at the hospital, they learn that Gunner is now awake and will survive after all. Gunner deflects Bucker's bedside attempt to confess his murderous intent and in a roundabout way says he forgives him. Both men now turn their wrath on Mary, who is ordered out of the hospital room. After she departs, Bucker begins ogling the attending nurse, who smiles at him. Gunner now thwarts his friend's romantic intentions yet again by tossing a coin on the floor behind the nurse as she now leaves the room. Disgusted by the ploy, which intends to get her to bend over to retrieve the coin and insinuates that her affections can be bought, the nurse turns and glares at Bucker, thinking he had done it. "Please forgive him," Gunner pleads facetiously from his bed, "He was born with a dirty brain." The film ends with the reconciled friends squabbling once more over their differences in how they relate to women.

== Cast ==
- John Gilbert as Gunner Smith
- Robert Armstrong as Bucker Reilly
- Mae Clarke as Mary
- Muriel Kirkland as Millie
- Vince Barnett as Spike
- Virginia Cherrill as Virginia
- Muriel Evans as Nurse
- Sterling Holloway as Pinky Magoo
- Guy Usher as Scudder
- Warner Richmond as Feets Wilson
- Robert Burns as Alabam
- Stanley Blystone as Cop (uncredited)

== Reception ==
Upon its release in 1933, the film received predominantly poor notices from reviewers in major newspapers and trade publications, as well as from theater owners and managers. There was, however, one element of the film consistently applauded by reviewers: Mae Clarke's performance. Mordaunt Hall, the critic for The New York Times, did not find sufficient "wit" in the light comedy "to make an audience feel any affection" for Gilbert's character as "an intolerable braggart", adding that "Mr. Gilbert is no better than the part he plays." Hall, on the other hand, reserved his praise for the screenplay's "designing girl" Mary, whom he described as "excellently played by Mae Clarke". Columnist and reviewer Jimmy Starr, writing for the Pittsburgh Post-Gazette, rated the film overall as only "Fair" and Gilbert as being "terribly miscast". Yet, Starr too judged Clarke's screen appearances as the best parts of the MGM production: "I find myself liking the performance of Mae Clarke, who stages a grand comeback. She's really a brilliant performer." In its assessment of the film, The Washington Post strained in 1933 to avoid bashing Gilbert's performance completely, calling it "not too terrible". Nevertheless, the newspaper in its March 11 review expresses a decided dislike for the actor's interpretation of Gunner Smith. "Gilbert", The Post reports, "executes his chore with an unbelievable degree of bland indifference, his man-of-the-world pose too overdrawn for reality."

Reviews of the "dramedy" in leading trade journals and fan magazines in 1933 were largely poor as well. Harrison's Reports, a New York film-review service, found virtually nothing redeeming about the production, deploring its content, overall tone, and pacing. The weekly publication, which promoted itself as "Free From the Influence of Advertising", was at that time a popular source of film evaluations for theater operators. As part of its report, Harrison's cautioned operators that Fast Workers was "Unsuitable for children, adolescents, and for Sundays":

Mediocre! The action is slow, the talk dirty and suggestive, and the behavior of the characters vile. The hero and his pal spend all of their spare time either drinking or with women. The heroine, a woman of the streets, is shown using her wiles on the hero's pal, making him believe she is innocent, and trapping him into marrying her. To make matters worse she is shown, after her marriage, going on a week-end trip with the hero....There are some comedy situations, but these are mostly of the vulgar type.

Photoplay, the nation's leading movie fan magazine in 1933, simply stated in its terse review, "Mae Clarke fine in a dull tale about a two-timing skyscraper riveter (Jack Gilbert)". Another widely read fan magazine, Picture Play, summed up the film in even fewer words: "a sour and sordid picture".

In their weekly reports to Motion Picture Herald in the spring and summer of 1933, theater owners in various locations in the United States personally complained about the film's plot and about the MGM production's poor drawing power at their box offices. Herman J. Brown, for example, owner of the Majestic Theatre in Nampa, Idaho, described Fast Workers as an "Unsatisfactory picture with a weak ending", noting it "Won't please" and "Business not good" during its screenings. Far from Idaho, Edith Fordyce, the proprietor of the Princess Theatre in Selma, Louisiana, advised her colleagues to present the film "on bargain night if you have to show it." Theater owner A. E. Hancock in Columbia City, Indiana specifically blamed Gilbert for the film's poor reception in his town. "The picture has some action and should have got [sic] money", insisted Hancock, "for Armstrong and Mae Clarke are liked but Gilbert is too much of a liability to put any picture over here."

Despite the film's numerous detractors in the print media, The Boston Globe, The Hartford Courant, and The Film Daily were among the relatively few newspapers and trade publications in 1933 that recommended the MGM release to their readers, although with some reservations. There were also defenders and apologists for Gilbert in the media, reviewers who insisted that weak scripts were largely responsible for any perceived deficiencies in the actor's performance in Fast Workers and in most of his earlier "talkies". Richard Watts Jr. of the New York Herald was one of his defenders:

"Fast Workers" is the last photoplay to be made by John Gilbert under his long contract with Metro-Goldwyn and it is unpleasant to report that it is just another in the long series of impossible stories allotted to him. It happens that Mr. Gilbert is, despite certain opinions to the contrary, an excellent actor, who can perform capably in a sensible role...In "Fast Workers" he is called upon to be a dashing fellow, irresistible to women, who is never so happy as when stealing a girl from his best friend, Robert Armstrong. It is an unpleasant role in a hopelessly bad picture and it can hardly be said that Mr. Gilbert leaves us smiling when he says good-by.

== Box office ==
In early 1933, despite the ongoing economic disruptions and financial uncertainties of the Great Depression, and the approaching expiration of John Gilbert's contract with MGM, the studio still committed $525,000 to the film's production budget, quite a high sum for a relatively short feature, especially given the cited circumstances. Ultimately, MGM reported earnings of only $165,000 on the film after its release, resulting in a net loss of $360,000 on the motion picture.

== Gilbert's voice ==
The sound track of Fast Workers belies claims that John Gilbert's film career declined due to the advent of talking pictures and, more specifically, to widespread negative reactions to his "unsuitable" voice by moviegoers in 1933. Contrary to some descriptions of Gilbert's voice being high-pitched and somewhat effeminate, his recorded dialogue in Fast Workers reveals a pleasant, rather rich voice, one that in both its pitch and tone is neither unusual nor somehow incompatible with the man being projected on the movie screen. In its review of the film after its release, the trade publication Variety describes Gilbert as being "miscast in his final appearance for Metro" (actually his last as a contract star for MGM), adding that his "voice [is] okay but the part doesn't suit."
