= Movie gimmick =

Novelty intended to promote a film

A movie gimmick is an unusual idea intended to enhance the viewing experience of a film, and thus increase box office sales. Many of these have been used for just a few films, proving unpopular with either audiences or cinema owners. Smell-o-vision, which involved releasing relevant odors during the film, only appeared in the film Scent of Mystery as audiences did not enjoy the experience. Sensurround, a method for enhancing sound pioneered for the 1974 film Earthquake, was abandoned as it sometimes resulted in damage to movie theatres. Other 'gimmicks' have gradually become more common in cinema, as technology has improved. Examples include 3-D film and the use of split screen, which was originally achieved through the use of dual projectors in cinemas.

== William Castle ==
Horror film director William Castle had a particular reputation for gimmicks, being termed 'King of the Gimmicks' by John Waters. For the 1959 film The Tingler, which concerns a creature growing at the base of the spine that can only be killed by screaming, some cinemas installed vibrating devices in the seats which were activated at random during one of the film's scenes, with a voice encouraging the audience to "Scream - scream for your lives." For the 1960 film 13 Ghosts, the onscreen ghosts could either be seen or hidden by the viewer through the use of different coloured cellophane.

== Table of gimmick films ==
3-D and widescreen films have been omitted. For 3-D films, see List of 3D films pre-2005 and List of 3D films. For widescreen films, see Early widescreen feature filmography, Fox Grandeur, CinemaScope, VistaVision, Cinerama, Todd-AO, and IMAX.

| Film | Year | Gimmick |
|---|---|---|
| The Power of Love | 1922 | In the now-lost 3D version of the film, the audience could choose between two different endings by only viewing the film through the left or right eye of their 3D glasses. |
| Napoleon | 1927 | Polyvision triptych |
| Macabre | 1958 | $1,000 life insurance policies given to audience members against "death by fright" |
| My World Dies Screaming (Terror In the Haunted House) | 1958 | Psychorama subliminal images |
| Behind the Great Wall | 1959 | AromaRama |
| A Date With Death | 1959 | Psychorama subliminal images |
| Horrors of the Black Museum | 1959 | HypnoVista prologue |
| House on Haunted Hill | 1959 | "Emergo" flying skeleton |
| The Tingler | 1959 | Percepto! seat vibrators |
| 13 Ghosts | 1960 | Illusion-o cellophane filters |
| The Hypnotic Eye | 1960 | HypnoMagic audience participation |
| Psycho | 1960 | "No late admissions" policy |
| Scent of Mystery | 1960 | Smell-o-vision |
| Homicidal | 1961 | "Fright break" prior to climax and "Coward's Corner" money-back guarantee |
| Mr. Sardonicus | 1961 | At the end of the film, the audience would vote in a 'Punishment Poll' to decide the main antagonist's fate by choosing between two alternate endings. (Note: Despite claims by the director, there is a possibility that an alternate ending was never actually filmed, and that the vote was rigged so that the regular ending would always win. No copies of this supposed alternate ending have ever surfaced, and its existence has been denied by at least one of the film's stars.) |
| Witchcraft | 1964 | "Witch deflector": small badge to grip during moments of terror |
| I Saw What You Did | 1965 | advertised an audience seat belt "shock section" |
| Chelsea Girls | 1966 | Two-projector split screen |
| Mark of the Devil | 1970 | "Rated V for Violence", sick bags distributed to audience |
| Wicked, Wicked | 1973 | Duo-Vision split-screen |
| Earthquake | 1974 | Sensurround |
| Midway | 1976 | Sensurround |
| Snuff | 1976 | marketed as an actual snuff film |
| Rollercoaster | 1977 | Sensurround |
| Battlestar Galactica (Saga of a Star World) | 1978 | Sensurround |
| Polyester | 1981 | Odorama scratch and sniff cards |
| Basket Case | 1982 | "free surgical masks - to keep the blood off your face" |
| Clue | 1985 | One of three endings would be shown depending on the theater it was screened in. |
| I'm Your Man | 1992 | At various points in the film, audiences were given 10 seconds to vote on three different outcomes using joysticks mounted on their seat's armrests. The winning outcome would be the one shown. Audiences were also encouraged to talk freely during the film, and could stay for as many screenings as they wanted. |
| Mr. Payback: An Interactive Movie | 1995 | At various points in the film, audiences were given 10 seconds to vote on three different outcomes using joysticks mounted on their seat's armrests. The winning outcome would be the one shown. Audiences were also encouraged to talk freely during the film, and could stay for as many screenings as they wanted. |
| Ride For Your Life | 1995 | At various points in the film, audiences were given 10 seconds to vote on three different outcomes using joysticks mounted on their seat's armrests. The winning outcome would be the one shown. Audiences were also encouraged to talk freely during the film, and could stay for as many screenings as they wanted. |
| Rugrats Go Wild | 2003 | Odorama scratch and sniff cards |
| Fast & Furious | 2009 | D-Box Technologies' motorized, vibrating seats |
| Kurt Josef Wagle og legenden om Fjordheksa | 2010 | scratch and sniff cards |
| Spy Kids: All the Time in the World | 2011 | Aroma-Scope scratch and sniff cards |
| 100 Years | 2115 | Postponed release date reflects the 100 years it takes for a bottle of Louis XIII Cognac to be produced. |

== See also ==
- 4D film
- Cinerama
- IMAX
