= They Had to See Paris =

1929 film

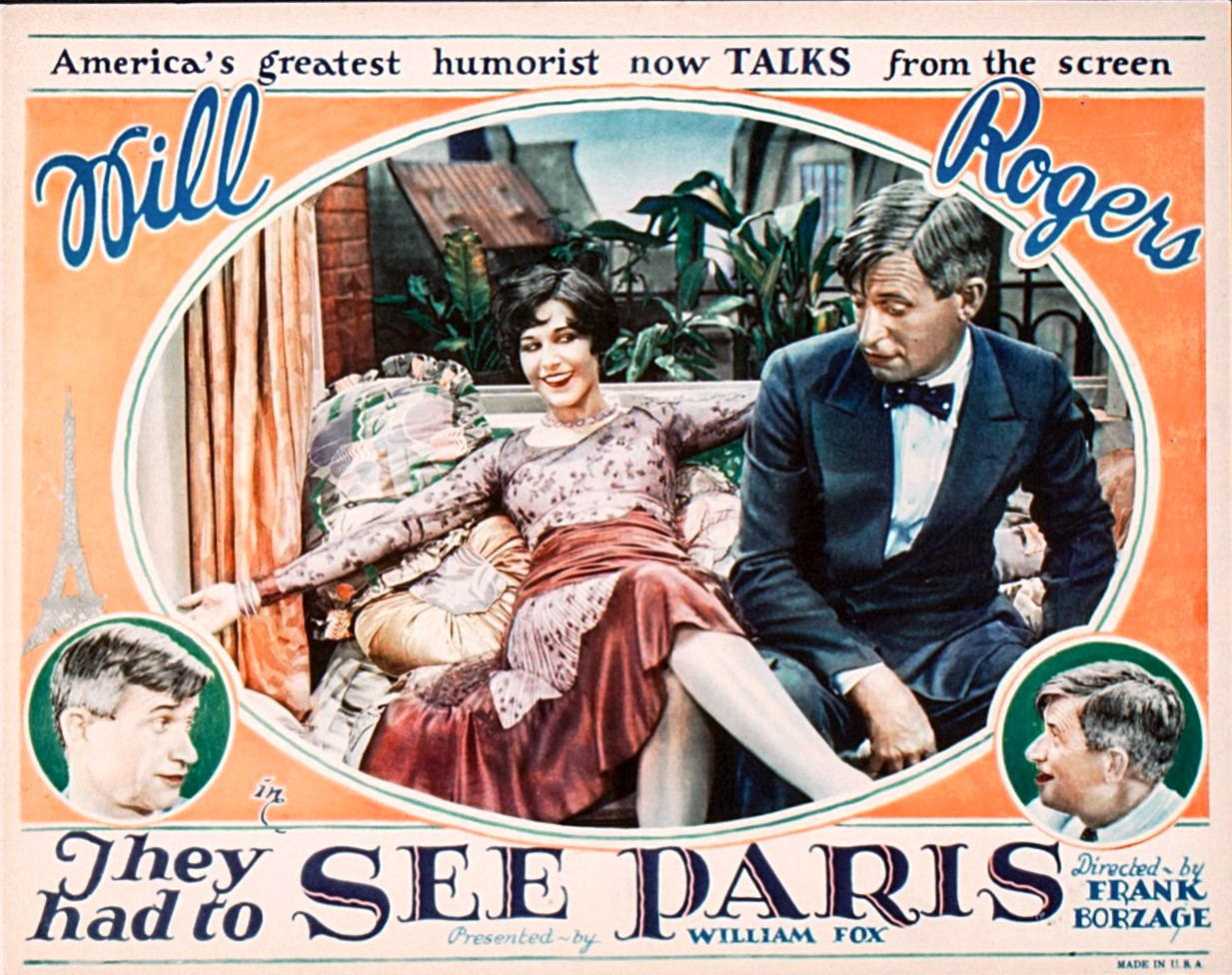
- Film poster
- Directed by: Frank Borzage
- Written by: Owen Davis
- Story by: Sonya Levien
- Based on: They Had to See Paris by Homer Croy
- Produced by: William Fox
- Starring: Will Rogers; Irene Rich; Marguerite Churchill
- Cinematography: Chester A. Lyons
- Edited by: Margaret Clancey (uncredited)
- Music by: George Lipschultz (uncredited)
- Distributed by: Fox Film Corporation
- Release date: September 18, 1929
- Running time: 95 minutes
- Country: United States
- Language: English

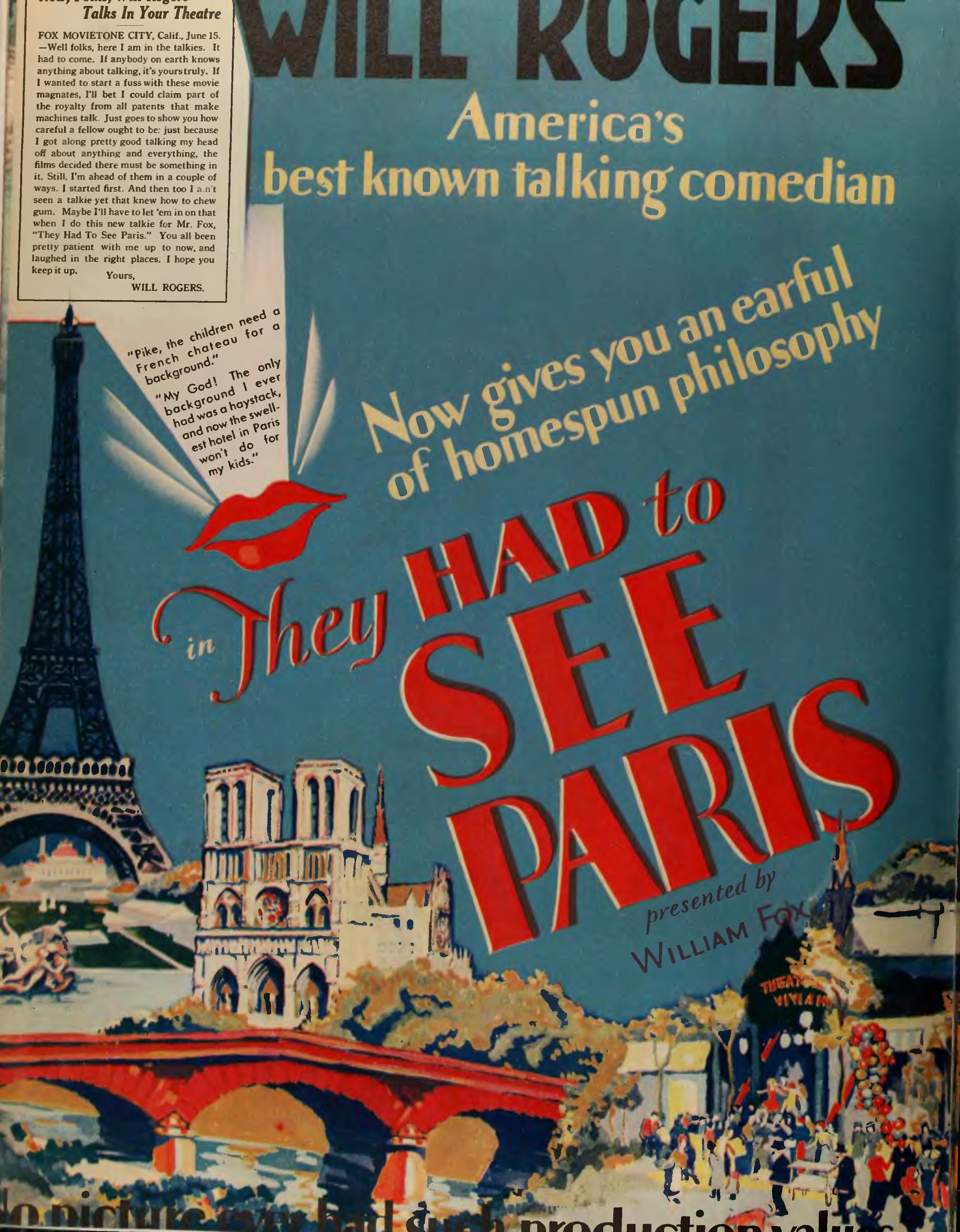
They Had to See Paris ad in The Film Daily, 1929

They Had to See Paris (1929)

They Had to See Paris is a 1929 American sound (All-Talking) Pre-Code comedy film directed by Frank Borzage and starring Will Rogers, Irene Rich, and Marguerite Churchill. The screenplay concerns a wealthy American oil tycoon who travels to Paris with his family at his wife's request, despite the fact he hates the French.

Rogers starred in a similar film the following year, So This Is London with the location switched to London. Rogers and Rich reprised their roles in Down to Earth (1932) which depicts the return of the Peters family to Depression-hit America.

== Cast ==
- Will Rogers as Pike Peters
- Irene Rich as Mrs. Idy Peters
- Owen Davis Jr. as Ross Peters
- Marguerite Churchill as Opal Peters
- Fifi D'Orsay as Fifi
- Rex Bell as Clark McCurdy
- Robert P. Kerr as Tupper
- Ivan Lebedeff as Marquis de Brissac
- Edgar Kennedy as Ed Eggers
- Marcelle Corday as Marquise De Brissac
- General Lodijensky as Grand Duke Mikhail
- André Cheron as Valet
- Gregory Gaye as Prince Ordinsky
- Marcia Manon as Miss Mason (uncredited)

== See also ==
- List of early sound feature films (1926–1929)
