= Junket Whore =

- Directed by: Debbie Melnyk
- Produced by: Rick Caine
- Narrated by: Lauren Hutton
- Release date: October 12, 1998
- Running time: 57 minutes
- Country: United States
- Language: English

Junket Whore is a 1998 documentary film directed by Debbie Melnyk and narrated by Lauren Hutton. It explores the relationship between Hollywood’s publicists and entertainment journalists.

It also stars many Hollywood artists including Sylvester Stallone, Martin Short, Alicia Silverstone, Charlie Sheen, Hugh Grant, Ed Harris, Gérard Depardieu, Jack Nicholson, Brooke Shields, Matthew McConaughey, Ashley Judd, Sharon Stone, John Travolta, Kelly Preston, Emma Thompson, Arnold Schwarzenegger, Tom Cruise, Nicolas Cage, Clint Eastwood, Jim Carrey, Robert De Niro, Whoopi Goldberg, Robin Williams, Richard Gere, Antonio Banderas, Pauly Shore, Sean Connery, Julianne Moore, Madonna, and Anthony Hopkins.

== See also ==
- Film promotion
