= Money Mad (1934 film) =

1934 film by Frank Richardson

- Directed by: Frank Richardson
- Screenplay by: Frank Richardson
- Produced by: Basil Humphreys
- Starring: Virginia Cherrill; Garry Marsh; D.A. Clarke-Smith
- Production company: Champion Productions at Isleworth
- Release date: 20 December 1934
- Running time: 64 minutes
- Country: United Kingdom
- Language: English

Money Mad (also known as Monday at Ten) is a 1934 British drama film directed and written by Frank Richardson and starring Virginia Cherrill, Garry Marsh, and Peter Gawthorne. It was made as a quota quickie.

== Preservation status ==
The British Film Institute National Archive holds no stills or ephemera, and no film or video materials.

== Plot ==
Sir John Leyland heads a team from the Stock Exchange which is trying to stop Rutherford, a reckless financier, trom inflating the British pound for his own selfish purposes. Rutherford manages to defeat them, but is finally out-witted.

== Cast ==
- Virginia Cherrill as Linda
- Garry Marsh as Rutherford
- D. A. Clarke-Smith as Phillips
- Peter Gawthorne as Sir John Leyland
- Helen Haye as Lady Leyland
- Lawrence Anderson as chauffeur
- Dennis Wyndham as assistant

== Reception ==
Kine Weekly wrote: "Money Mad is a typical quota picture; the idea behind it is ambitious, but its exploitation is paltry. The story attempts to combine the serious with the comic, but it is so clumsily accomplished thai the result is a film that fails to find a place within the circle of legitimate entertainment. Very moderate supporting feature for unexacting patrons. ... The stazing is far from costly, and the fights, with which the development is besprinkled, are tame."

The Daily Film Renter wrote: "Satisfactorily directed, picture has several amusing moments, emerging as pleasant quota offering for the masses. ... There is little original matter in the story, and the quick succession of spies outwitted by Rutherford is somewhat ingenuously handled. There are, however, one or two amusing moments."
