= The Brat =

1931 American film by John Ford

- Poster to The Brat (1931)
- Directed by: John Ford
- Written by: S. N. Behrman; Maude Fulton (uncredited); Sonya Levien
- Based on: The Brat by Maude Fulton
- Starring: Sally O'Neil; Alan Dinehart; Virginia Cherrill
- Cinematography: Joseph H. August
- Edited by: Alex Troffey
- Distributed by: Fox Film Corporation
- Release date: September 20, 1931
- Running time: 60 minutes
- Country: United States
- Language: English

The Brat is a 1931 American pre-Code comedy film directed by John Ford, starring Sally O'Neil, and featuring Virginia Cherrill. The film is based on the 1917 play by Maude Fulton. A previous silent film had been made in 1919 with Alla Nazimova. This 1931 screen version has been updated to then contemporary standards i.e. clothing, speech, topics in the news.

== Plot ==
A novelist brings a wild chorus girl home, hoping to study her for inspiration for his new novel. His snobby upper-class family is upset by her presence, but soon she has changed their lives forever.

== Cast ==
- Sally O'Neil as the Brat
- Alan Dinehart as Macmillan Forester
- Frank Albertson as Stephen Forester
- William Collier, Sr. as Judge O"Flaherty
- Virginia Cherrill as Angela
- June Collyer as Jane
- J. Farrell MacDonald as Timson, the butler
- Mary Forbes as Mrs. Forester
- Albert Gran as Bishop
- Louise Mackintosh as Lena
- Margaret Mann as Housekeeper
- Ward Bond as Court Policeman (uncredited)
- Mary Gordon as Angry Wife in Night Court (uncredited)
- George Humbert as Italian Restaurant Owner (uncredited)
- Cyril McLaglen as Cyril (uncredited)
- Philip Sleeman as Masher in Night Court (uncredited)

== Background ==
Writer Maude Fulton was an actress as well and starred in the 1917 Broadway premiere of her own play. Two of her co-stars in the play went on to have major film careers, Lewis Stone and Edmund Lowe. The film was restored in DCP form and exhibited at New York City's Museum of Modern Art in November 2016.
