= The Walking Dead (1936 film) =

1936 film by Michael Curtiz

- Theatrical release poster
- Directed by: Michael Curtiz
- Screenplay by: Ewart Adamson; Peter Milne; Robert Andrews; Lillie Hayward
- Story by: Ewart Adamson; Joseph Fields
- Produced by: Jack L. Warner
- Starring: Boris Karloff; Ricardo Cortez; Edmund Gwenn; Marguerite Churchill
- Cinematography: Hal Mohr
- Edited by: Tommy Prat
- Music by: Bernhard Kaun
- Production companies: Warner Bros. Pictures; First National Pictures
- Distributed by: Warner Bros. Pictures
- Release date: February 29, 1936 (New York City)
- Running time: 66 minutes
- Country: United States
- Budget: $217,000
- Box office: $589,000

The Walking Dead is a 1936 American science fiction horror film directed by Michael Curtiz and starring Boris Karloff, Edmund Gwenn, Ricardo Cortez, Marguerite Churchill, and Barton MacLane. The film portrays a wrongly executed man who is restored to life by a scientist. The film blends elements of the horror genre with the gangster film, and also features elements of a religious morality parable.

Distributed by Warner Bros. Pictures, The Walking Dead premiered in the New York City on February 29, 1936. It was a commercial success for Warner Bros. domestically, though it was subject to censorship in several countries, receiving numerous cuts by film censors in the United Kingdom, as well as being banned in Finland, Switzerland, and Singapore.

The film's portrayal of a physician using a mechanical heart to revive the patient is notable in that it foreshadowed modern medicine's mechanical heart used to keep patients alive during cardiac surgery.

== Plot ==
After Judge Roger Shaw finds a man guilty of diverting and misappropriating public funds and sentences him to ten years with no parole, a plan is hatched to get back at Shaw with murder by a gang of racketeers. John Ellman, recently released after being jailed by Shaw for ten years after striking a man that led to his death, is asked to take watch of Shaw for supposed infidelity. Shaw is shot and killed in his car with Ellman found at the scene of the crime (having heard the crash) and assumed to be the murderer; Nancy and Jimmy, a young couple working for Dr. Evan Beaumont, had seen the dead body being moved into a car, but are told by a mysterious man to keep quiet. Ellman is framed for the murder. He is unfairly tried (complete with mediocre work from Nolan for the defense) and despite the fact that his innocence has been proven, he is sent to the electric chair and executed. Beaumont (who had called Ellman's attorney about the couple) retrieves his dead body and revives it as part of his experiments to reanimate a dead body and discover what happens to the soul after death.

Although John Ellman has no direct knowledge of anyone wishing to frame him for the murder before he is executed, he gains an innate sense of knowing those who are responsible after he is revived; Nolan is appointed as guardian for Ellman, who is then given a settlement from the state of $500,000. Strangely, Ellman seems to sense that Nolan is his enemy. Ellman takes no direct action against his framers; however, he seeks them out, wishing to know why they had him killed.

Each of Ellman's framers dies a horrible death, and in the end it is their own guilt that causes their deaths: He first visits Trigger, frightening him and causing him to accidentally shoot himself to death. Blackstone, unnerved by Trigger's death, attempts to leave town, but flees in fright when he encounters Ellman at the train depot, and is hit by an oncoming train. The next night, Ellman visits Merritt at his apartment, causing him to suffer a heart attack and fall from his window to his death. Ellman subsequently goes missing, and is found wandering a cemetery by Nancy. She attempts to convince him to return with her, but he remains evasive. As Nancy flees to notify Beaumont, Ellman is mortally shot by the remaining two conspirators who framed him.

Dr. Beaumont hurries to the cemetery, where Ellman lay in a dying state in the gravekeeper's cottage. Although pressed by Beaumont to reveal insights about the afterlife, Ellman admonishes him, quoting Deuteronomy 6:15: "Leave the dead to their maker. The Lord our God is a jealous God." As Ellman dies, the two remaining racketeers are killed when their car runs off the road, crashes into an electric pole, and explodes. The film ends with Dr. Beaumont repeating Ellman's warning about a jealous God.

== Cast ==
- Boris Karloff as John Ellman
- Ricardo Cortez as Nolan
- Edmund Gwenn as Dr. Beaumont
- Marguerite Churchill as Nancy
- Warren Hull as Jimmy
- Barton MacLane as Loder
- Henry O'Neill as Werner
- Joseph King as Judge Shaw
- Addison Richards as Prison Warden
- Paul Harvey as Blackstone
- Robert Strange as Merritt
- Joseph Sawyer as Trigger Smith
- Eddie Acuff as Betcha
- Kenneth Harlan as Stephen Martin
- Miki Morita as Sako
- Ruth Robinson as Mrs. Shaw
- Frank Darien as Watchman (uncredited)

== Production ==
=== Development ===
The Walking Dead's executive producer Hal Wallis wrote to the production supervisor, Lou Edelman, on August 16, 1935, that he had sent him a six-page outline for a film titled The Walking Dead. The original story for the film was written by Ewart Adamson and Joseph Fields. On November 1, director Michael Curtiz was sent the draft of the film. A few days before shooting was scheduled, actor Boris Karloff voiced problems involving his character John Ellman. These issues included Ellman's lack of speech, which he felt was too close to his role in Frankenstein (1931), and Ellman's Tarzan-like agility, which he felt would induce laughter. Wallis brought in three more writers for the film.

In addition to Karloff's stunted dialogue, this film's resemblance to Universal's Frankenstein is most obvious when Edmund Gwenn's character revives Karloff, including the dramatic change in music, the pulsating lab equipment, off-kilter camera angles, and, finally, Gwenn saying, "He's alive".

=== Casting ===
The Walking Dead was the first film Karloff made with Warner Bros.

=== Filming ===
The Walking Dead was filmed at Griffith Park, California, as well as at the Warner Bros. Studios and Burbank First National–Warner Bros. Studios between November 23 and December 1935. Dialogue director Irving Rapper worked on the film. He called it "a bad story" but enjoyed working with Curtiz.

== Release ==
The Walking Dead premiered in New York City on February 29, 1936. The film was re-released theatrically in 1942. Two decades later, United Artists Associates syndicated the film to local US television stations as part of its 58-film package "Science Fiction-Horror-Monster Features." The package became available on May 15, 1963.

=== Censorship ===
Though released uncut in the United States, The Walking Dead was banned in Finland, Switzerland, and Singapore, due to its "gruesome" content. In Australia, the film was released uncensored, but with a preface title card warning to audiences: "Censorship Warning; Nervous and Excitable People Should Avoid This Horror Picture."

In the United Kingdom, the film was censored to shorten footage of Ellman's walk to the electric chair, as well as eliminate shots of Ellman's pulsing heart in a test tube. Additionally, the dialogue in which Ellman and Dr. Beaumont say, "The Lord Our God is a jealous God" was truncated by British censors to "Our God is a jealous God."

=== Home media ===
Warner Bros. Home Entertainment released The Walking Dead on DVD in 2009 as part of a multi-film set featuring You'll Find Out (1940), Zombies on Broadway (1945), and Frankenstein 1970 (1958). The Warner Archive Collection released the film on Blu-ray on October 29, 2024.

== Reception ==
=== Box office ===
The Walking Dead was a box office hit for Warner Bros., grossing approximately $273,000 in the United States. In international markets, it earned an additional $316,000, for a worldwide gross of $589,000, and a profit of $94,750 for Warner Bros.

=== Critical response ===
Writing in the March 4, 1936, issue of Variety, the reviewer "Odec" said that the film would provide "limited satisfaction" for film patrons with "a yen for shockers." The reviewer wrote: "The director and the supporting cast try hard to give some semblance of credibility to the trite and pseudo-scientific vaporings of the writers, but the best they can produce is something that moves swiftly enough but contains little of sustained interest." Further, "Odec" predicted: "Karloff will have to be sold on past performances" as The Walking Dead "lets him down badly."

Frank Nugent of The New York Times praised the film for Karloff's performance, which he described as "something to haunt your sleep at nights," before concluding: "Horror pictures are a staple commodity, and this one was taken from one of the better shelves."

Variety wrote of the film: "Those with a yen for shockers will get limited satisfaction from the story that has been wrapped around Boris Karloff’s initial stalking piece under the Warner banner."

== See also ==
- Boris Karloff filmography
- The Man They Could Not Hang

== Sources ==
- Heffernan, Kevin (2004). Ghouls, Gimmicks, and Gold: Horror Films and the American Movie Business, 1953–1968. Durham, North Carolina: Duke University Press. ISBN 978-0-822-33202-2.
- Higham, Charles; Greenberg, Joel (1971). The Celluloid Muse: Hollywood Directors Speak. Los Angeles, California: Signet. OCLC 769493.
- Jacobs, Stephen (2011). Boris Karloff: More Than a Monster. Sheffield, England: Tomahawk Press. ISBN 978-0-955-76704-3.
- Mank, Gregory William (2001). The Hollywood Cauldron: Thirteen Horror Films from the Genre's Golden Age. Jefferson, North Carolina: McFarland. ISBN 978-0-786-46255-1.
- Mank, Gregory William (2014). The Very Witching Time of Night: Dark Alleys of Classic Horror Cinema. Jefferson, North Carolina: McFarland. ISBN 978-1-476-61543-1.
- Markusen, Bruce (2021). Hosted Horror on Television: The Films and Faces of Shock Theater, Creature Features and Chiller Theater. Jefferson, North Carolina: McFarland. ISBN 978-1-476-64328-1.
- Willis, Donald, ed. (1985). Variety's Complete Science Fiction Reviews. Garland, New York: Garland Publishing Inc. ISBN 978-0-824-06263-7.
