= Girl Without a Room =

1933 film

- Theatrical poster to Girl Without a Room (1933)
- Directed by: Ralph Murphy
- Written by: Claude Binyon; Frank Butler; Jack Lait (novel)
- Produced by: Charles R. Rogers
- Starring: Charles Farrell; Charles Ruggles; Marguerite Churchill
- Cinematography: Leo Tover
- Edited by: Richard C. Currier
- Distributed by: Paramount Pictures
- Release date: December 8, 1933
- Running time: 78 minutes
- Country: United States
- Language: English

Girl Without a Room is a 1933 American pre-Code musical comedy film starring Charles Farrell, Charles Ruggles, and Marguerite Churchill. This early light comedy farce set in Paris was written by Claude Binyon, Frank Butler, and Jack Lait, and directed by Ralph Murphy.

As well as featuring some scenes with dialogue rendered in rhyming couplets, the film is notable as an example of Hollywood's attitude to abstract art in the 1930s. The hero is a no-nonsense representational artist from Tennessee, who, transplanted to Paris, meets a crowd of pretentious types in a Montparnasse garret. Chief among them is an artist who believes in depicting the soul of an object rather than the object itself. Played by comic star Charlie Ruggles, his name is "Crock" (one of the meanings of which, ironically, is scam or con, in American vernacular English).

== Cast ==
- Charles Farrell as Tom Duncan
- Charles Ruggles as Vergil Crock
- Marguerite Churchill as Kay Loring
- Gregory Ratoff as Serge Alexovich
- Walter Woolf King as Arthur Copeland
- Mischa Auer as Walksky
- Grace Bradley as Nada
