= Virginia Cherrill =

American actress (1908–1996)

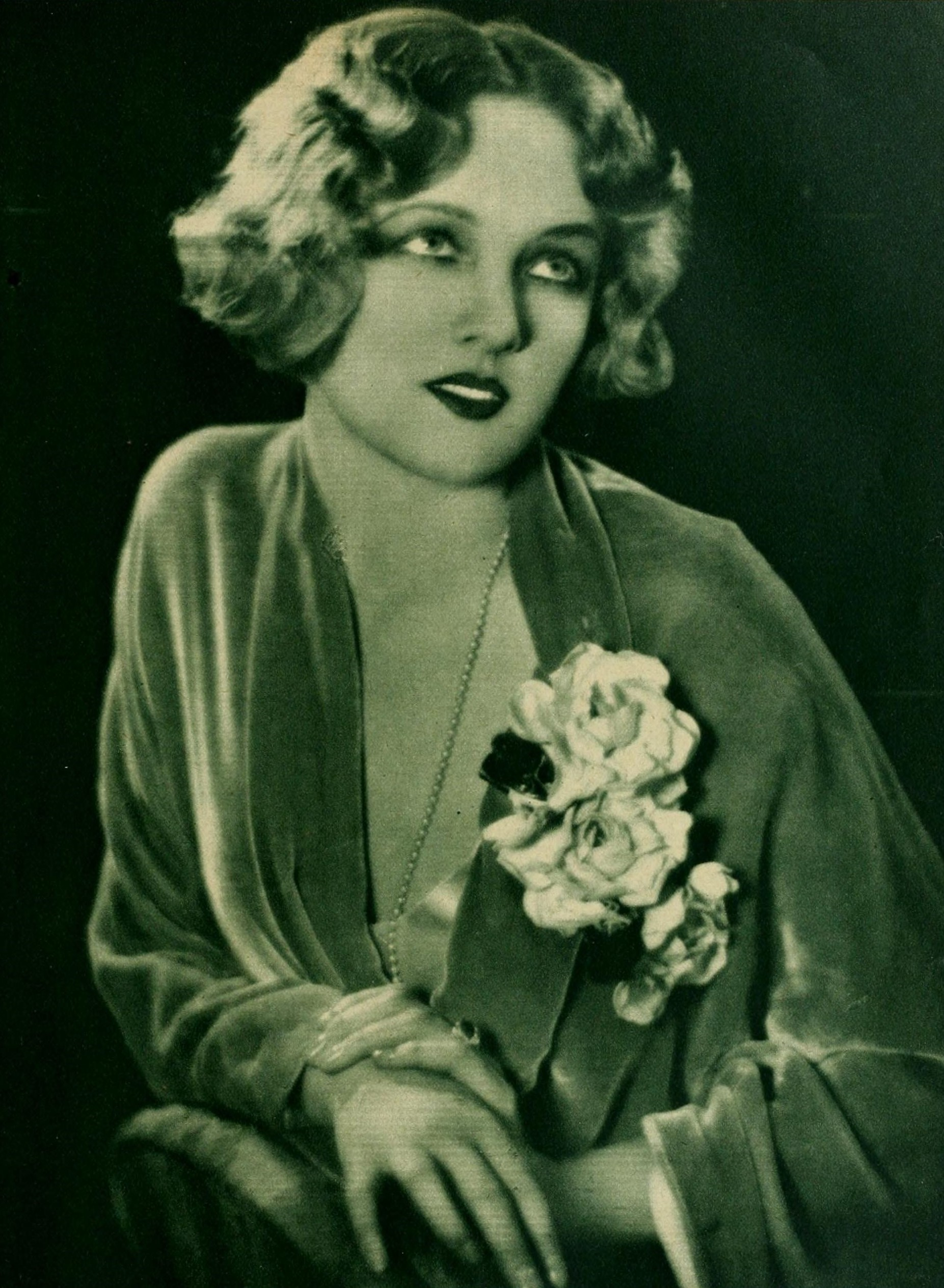
- Cherrill in 1929
- Born: April 12, 1908; Carthage, Illinois, U.S.
- Died: November 14, 1996 (aged 88); Santa Barbara, California, U.S.
- Occupation: Actress
- Years active: 1928–1936
- Spouses: Irving Adler (m. 1925; div. 1928) Cary Grant (m. 1934; div. 1935) George Child-Villiers, 9th Earl of Jersey (m. 1937; div. 1946) Florian Martini (m. 1948)

Virginia Cherrill (April 12, 1908 – November 14, 1996), styled as Virginia Child Villiers, Countess of Jersey between 1937 and 1946, was an American actress best known to modern audiences for her role as the blind flower girl in Charlie Chaplin's City Lights (1931).

== Early life ==
Virginia Cherrill was born on a farm in rural Carthage, Illinois, to James E. and Blanche (née Wilcox) Cherrill. She attended schools in Chicago and Kenosha, Wisconsin.

She initially did not plan on a film career, but her friendship with Sue Carol (who later married Alan Ladd) eventually drew her to Hollywood. She had been voted "Queen of the Artists Ball" in Chicago in 1925 and was invited to perform on the variety stage by Florenz Ziegfeld, an offer she declined. She found her first marriage unsatisfying, and through her friendship with Sue Carol, decamped to California where she met William Randolph Hearst, went to Hollywood for a visit and met Charlie Chaplin when he sat next to her at a boxing match; however, Chaplin wrote in his autobiography that she approached him on the beach wanting him to cast her in his film while acknowledging that he had met her before.

== Career ==
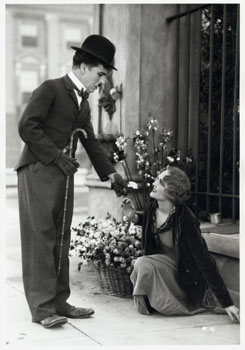
Chaplin and Cherrill in City Lights

Chaplin soon cast Cherrill in City Lights. Although the film and her performance were well-received, her working relationship with Chaplin on the film was often strained. As indicated in the documentary Unknown Chaplin, Cherrill was briefly fired from the film: by her account, for returning late from lunch; by Alastair Cooke's account (quoting Chaplin) for asking, on the day of the emotional climactic shoot, to leave early for a hairdressing appointment. Chaplin planned to re-film all her scenes with Georgia Hale, but ultimately realized too much money had already been spent on the film. Cherrill recalls in the documentary that she followed close friend Marion Davies's advice to hold out for more money when Chaplin asked her to return to the film.

Even before City Lights was released, 20th Century Fox signed Cherrill to a contract. Following the success of City Lights, the studio put her to work in early sound films of the 1930s, such as Girls Demand Excitement (1931), one of John Wayne's early films as a star. Big-name directors cast her in their films, such as John Ford in The Brat (1931) and Tod Browning in Fast Workers (1933). She also appeared in the 1931 Gershwin musical Delicious with Janet Gaynor. She then went to Britain where she starred in two of James Mason's earlier films, including Troubled Waters, which turned out to be her last film. None of these later films were hits, and she gave up her film career, claiming that she was "no great shakes as an actress."

== Personal life ==
Cherrill married four times. She had no children.

Her first husband, Irving Adler, was a rich Chicago lawyer (not the famed scientist Irving Adler). They were married in 1925 and divorced in 1928.

Considerable publicity attended an engagement to the wealthy William Rhinelander Stewart Jr. (1888–1945) that was announced in July 1932. The two sailed from Hawaii on Vincent Astor's yacht, on which the ceremony was planned, but returned thereafter, having broken off the wedding by mutual consent.

Cherrill married actor Cary Grant on February 9, 1934, in London. She received a divorce on March 26, 1935, in Los Angeles after alleging that Grant was abusive toward her.

She married George Child-Villiers, 9th Earl of Jersey in 1937, becoming the Countess of Jersey until their divorce in 1946.

At the time of her death, she and Polish flying ace Florian Kazimierz Martini had been married for 48 years. Cherrill died at a hospital at 88.

== Recognition ==
Cherrill has a star on the Hollywood Walk of Fame at 1545 Vine Street.

== Filmography ==
Year	Title	Role	Note
1928	The Air Circus	Extra	Uncredited
1931	City Lights	Blind Girl	
1931	Girls Demand Excitement	Joan Madison	
1931	The Brat	Angela	
1931	Delicious	Diana Van Bergh	
1933	Fast Workers	Virginia	
1933	The Nuisance	Miss Rutherford	
1933	He Couldn't Take It	Eleanor Rogers	
1933	Charlie Chan's Greatest Case	Barbara Winterslip	Lost film
1933	Ladies Must Love	Bill's Society Fiancée	
1934	Cane Fire / White Heat	Lucille Cheney	Lost film
1934	Money Mad	Linda	
1935	What Price Crime	Sandra Worthington	
1935	Late Extra	Janet Graham	
1936	Troubled Waters	June Elkhardt	
1983	Unknown Chaplin	Herself	TV mini-series/documentary, 1 episode
