= Ambassador Bill =

1931 film by Sam Taylor

- Directed by: Sam Taylor
- Written by: Guy Bolton
- Starring: Will Rogers; Marguerite Churchill; Greta Nissen; Ray Milland
- Cinematography: John J. Mescall
- Edited by: Harold D. Schuster
- Music by: Arthur Kay
- Production company: Fox Film Corporation
- Distributed by: Fox Film Corporation
- Release date: November 22, 1931
- Running time: 70 minutes
- Country: United States
- Language: English

Ambassador Bill is a 1931 American Pre-Code comedy film directed by Sam Taylor and starring Will Rogers and Marguerite Churchill. The film also features Greta Nissen and Ray Milland.

== Plot ==
Bill Harper is an American ambassador. After his arrival in a small country that is besieged by civil unrest, he befriends the young boy who is to be the country's king. King Lothar is in exile due to the Prince De Polikoff spreading false rumors about his maritial infidelity so Polikoff can eventually seize control.

Harper teaches the young boy King how to play baseball, holding up Babe Ruth as an example of good American sportsmanship. He also teaches the local diplomats how to play poker, winning concessions at the gaming table that he couldn't obtain officially. Harper is not fazed by the sight of ex-Ambassador Littleton, a nervous wreck in a wheelchair who has a nervous collapse at the slightest unfamiliar sound.

Things get tricky when stuffed shirt United States Senator Pillsbury arrives to check on diplomatic progress. Thanks to a fake tryst from Countess Ilka, Pillsbury is prepared to ask for Harper's recall. But things change when the two men, handcuffed together, find themselves on the run from Polikoff's secret police. Entering a disreputable tavern, they ask for someone to chop off their handcuffs. Cross-eyed Ben Turpin appears, wielding an axe. They decide they'd rather stay handcuffed.

King Lothar eventually leads a counter-revolution that deposes Polikoff, and Harper earns the delayed gratitude of the Queen when he rescues The Boy King from the line of fire.

== Cast ==
- Will Rogers as Bill Harper
- Marguerite Churchill as Queen Vanya
- Greta Nissen as Countess Ilka
- Tad Alexander as King Paul
- Ray Milland as King Lothar
- Gustav von Seyffertitz as Prince de Polikoff
- Arnold Korff as The General
- Edwin Maxwell as Monte
- Tom Ricketts as Former Ambassor Littleton
- Ernest Wood as Northfield Slater
- Herbert Bunston as British Ambassador
- Ferdinand Munier as Senator Pillsbury
- Ben Turpin as The Butcher
- Frank Atkinson as American Embassy Valet
- Georgia Caine as Monte's Wife
- Carrie Daumery as Dinner Guest
- Michael Mark as Republican Revolutionary Sniper
- Eric Mayne as Dignitary at Court
- Toshia Mori as Dinner Guest
- Edmund Mortimer as Embassy Aide
- Paul Panzer as Revolutionary
- Lon Poff as Armored Car Chauffeur
- Russ Powell as Drunk Republican Revolutionary Celebrant
