= Peter Ganine =

Russian–American sculptor (1900–1974)

- Born: Pierre Ganine; 11 October 1900; Tiflis, Russia
- Died: 11 August 1974 (aged 73); Hollywood, California, U.S.
- Education: Corcoran Gallery of Art
- Spouses: Marguerite Churchill (1954–?); Karin (?–1974)

Peter Ganine (October 11, 1900 – August 11, 1974) was a Georgian-Russian-American sculptor, best known for his work in ceramics and his chess sets.

== Early life and education ==
Ganine was born in Tiflis, Russia on October 11, 1900, and began his art studies there. He spent five years as a trader in the Belgian Congo, before coming to the U.S. in 1931, on a scholarship to the Corcoran Gallery of Art in Washington, D.C.

== Career ==
Ganine settled in Hollywood in 1932, where he would remain for the rest of his life. He gained prominence in the local art scene, with his work regularly championed by longtime Los Angeles Times art editor and critic Arthur Millier.

During World War II, he worked as an aircraft patternmaker. His artistic subjects were primarily animals and people, and he became especially known for his stylized animal figures. Many of his designs were patented and mass-produced in plastic, making his work widely accessible.

Among his most popular creations were a toy whale, which was awarded a prize by "the Metropolitan Museum of Modern Art [sic]", (Note: This museum name, quoted directly from the Los Angeles Times, is a mix of Metropolitan Museum of Art and the Museum of Modern Art.) and an "uncapsizeable duck", of which more than 50 million were sold. Other patented works include various stylized animal figures:

Ganine also designed a new form of chess set that gave human characteristics to the pieces. This was widely cited as the "first major change of design for chess sets in more than a century."

== Personal life ==
Ganine married actress Marguerite Churchill on June 5, 1954. He later married a woman named Karin.

== Works ==
- Superba Gothic chess set (c.1930s)
- Colt sculpture (c.1939)
- Baby Centaur sculpture (c.1940) – won first prize in ceramic sculpture at the National Ceramic Exhibition
- Beer Mug sculpture (c.1941)
- Rudolph sculpture of a Dachshund (c.1941)
- Bull sculpture (c.1941)
- Dog sculpture (c.1944)
- Why sculpture (c.1944)
- Life Mask of Nicholai Fechin sculpture (1945)
- Happy Womanhood sculpture (c.1947) – model: Maureen O'Hara
- Hosanna sculpture of choir boys (c.1948)
- Classic chess set (1961) – the chess pieces from the Classic chess set were used in Star Trek as part of the tri-dimensional chess set
- Rearing Colt sculpture
- Portrait of Marguerite Churchill sculpture

== Exhibitions ==
- 1938 – Group show at the California Art Club
- 1939 – Golden Gate International Exposition
- 1939 – Fine Arts Gallery of San Diego
- 1940 – National Ceramic Exhibition at Syracuse Museum of Fine Arts – won first prize for Baby Centaur
- 1942 – "Artist of the Month" for January, solo show at the Los Angeles County Museum
- 1944 – Society for Sanity in Art group show at Los Angeles County Museum
- 1960 – Group show at W. & J. Sloane Petite Galerie, Beverly Hills
