= Marguerite Churchill =

American actress (1910–2000)

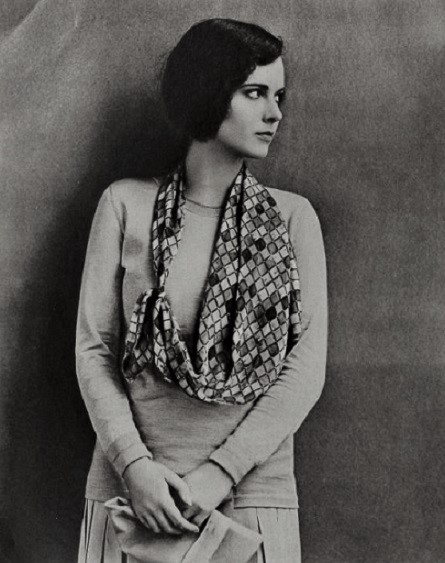
- Churchill in 1929
- Born: Marguerite Graham Churchill; December 26, 1910; Kansas City, Missouri, U.S.
- Died: January 9, 2000 (aged 89); Broken Arrow, Oklahoma, U.S.
- Occupation: Actress
- Years active: 1922–1952
- Known for: Charlie Chan Carries On
- Spouses: George O'Brien (m. 1933; div. 1948): Peter Ganine (m. 1954; div. 19??)
- Children: 3, including Darcy and Orin O'Brien

Marguerite Graham Churchill (December 26, 1910 – January 9, 2000) was an American stage and film actress whose career spanned 30 years, from 1922 to 1952. Marguerite made her debut as a child actress on Broadway in 1922. She debuted onscreen in 1929, and appeared in more than 25 films. She frequently appeared in westerns such as Riders of the Purple Sage (1931) and was John Wayne's first leading lady in The Big Trail (1930). She also appeared in action films and in mysteries such as Charlie Chan Carries On (1931).

== Career ==
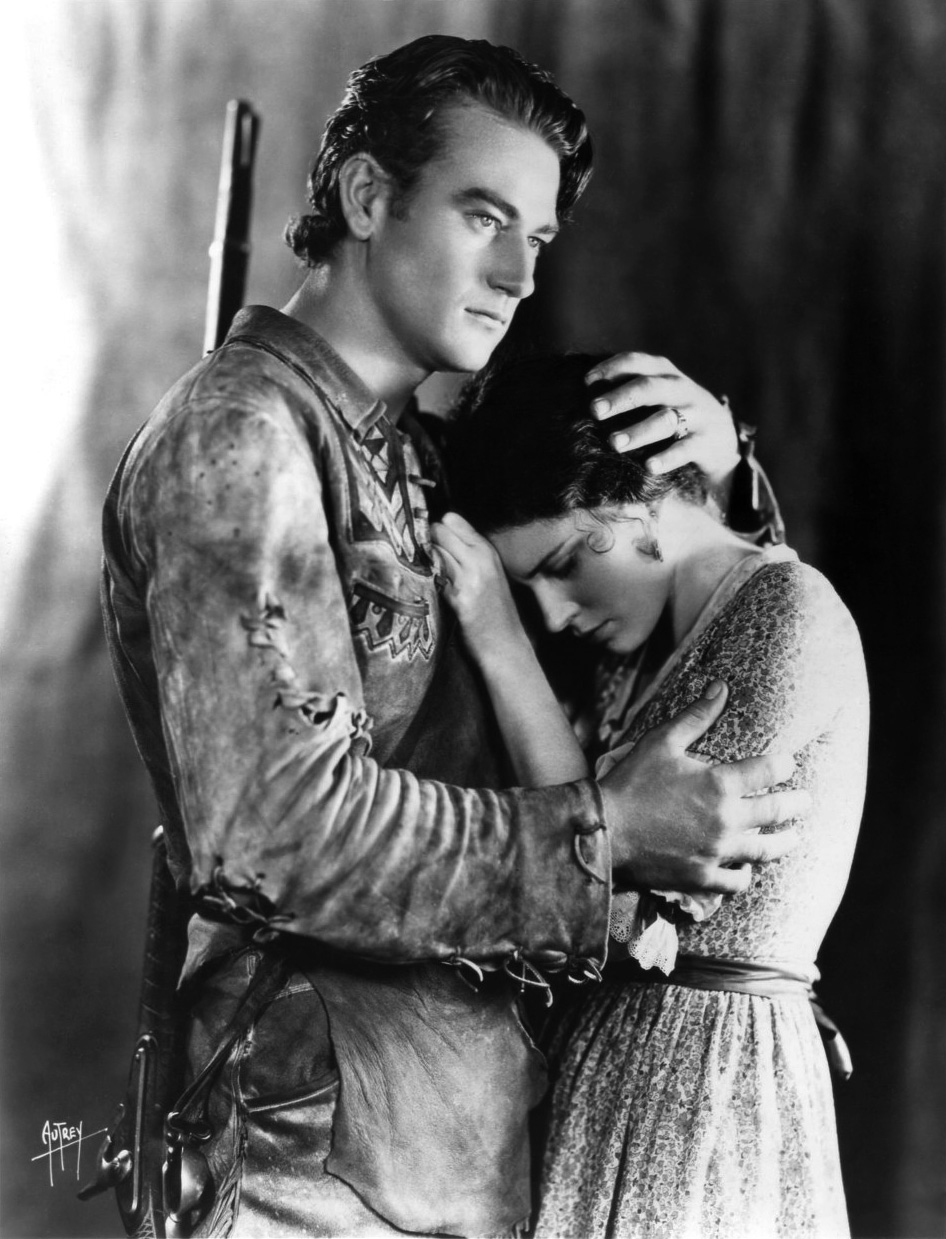
With John Wayne in The Big Trail

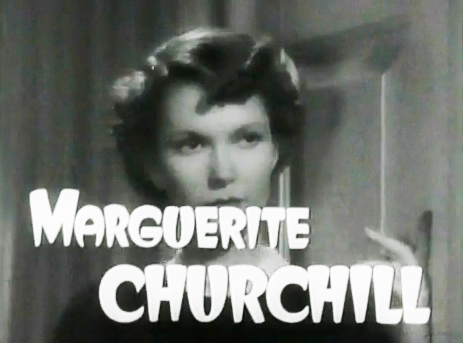
Churchill in Dracula's Daughter (1936)

Marguerite Graham Churchill was born on December 26, 1910 in Kansas City, Missouri. She was a daughter of movie producer Edward Paycen Churchill, who died on December 11, 1920. Churchill attended the Professional Children's School in New York City, with Milton Berle among others. She also attended the Theatre Guild Dramatic School in Manhattan where she worked with Winifred Lenihan, winning both the Winthrop Ames and Otto H. Khan scholarships.

A child actress, Churchill made her Broadway debut on Christmas Day 1922, the day before her 12th birthday. (Note: Some sources mistakenly cited the date as her 13th birthday.) The show was Why Worry? (1922–23). At sixteen, Churchill was described as "an outstanding ingenue lead" for her role in The House of Shadows (1927). In 1932, she appeared in the first Broadway production of "Dinner at Eight".

Fox Films offered her a contract which led to her screen debut in the comedy short The Diplomats (1929). Her first feature-length film was The Valiant (1929) in which she appeared with Paul Muni and John Mack Brown.

Over the course of her career, Churchill appeared in more than 25 films. She played leading lady to John Wayne in Raoul Walsh's The Big Trail (1930), an early widescreen epic and Wayne's first leading role. She appeared with Wayne again in Girls Demand Excitement (1931), with Spencer Tracy and George Raft in Quick Millions (1931), with Will Rogers in Ambassador Bill (1931), with Warner Oland in Charlie Chan Carries On (1931), with her future husband George O'Brien in Riders of the Purple Sage (1931), with Charles Farrell in Girl Without a Room (1933), with Ralph Bellamy in The Final Hour (1936), with Boris Karloff in The Walking Dead (1936), and with Edward Van Sloan in Dracula's Daughter (1936).

On Broadway, Churchill performed in And Now Good-bye (1937), Dinner at Eight (1932), The Inside Story (1932), Skidding (1928), The Wild Man of Borneo (1927), House of Shadows (1927), and Why Not? (1922).

== Personal life ==
Churchill married actor George O'Brien on July 15, 1933. Their first child, Brian, died 10 days after his birth. Their daughter, Orin O'Brien, became a double bassist for the New York Philharmonic. Their youngest child, Darcy O'Brien (1939–1998), was an author and college professor. Churchill and O'Brien divorced in 1948. Darcy O'Brien's novel Margaret in Hollywood (1991) has been described as loosely based upon his mother's life.

On June 5, 1954, Churchill married sculptor Peter Ganine. That union also ended in divorce.

Marguerite Churchill died on January 9, 2000, aged 89, in Broken Arrow, Oklahoma, from natural causes.

== Partial filmography ==
Year	Title	Role	Notes
1929	The Valiant	Mary Douglas	Co-starring Paul Muni in his film debut
1929	Pleasure Crazed	Nora Westby	
1929	They Had to See Paris	Opal Peters	With Will Rogers
1929	Seven Faces	Hélène Berthelot	
1930	Harmony at Home	Louise Haller	With Rex Bell
1930	Born Reckless	Rosa Beretti	With Edmund Lowe
1930	Good Intentions	Helen Rankin	
1930	The Big Trail	Ruth Cameron	With John Wayne
1931	Girls Demand Excitement	Miriam	With John Wayne
1931	Charlie Chan Carries On	Pamela Potter	With Warner Oland
1931	Quick Millions	Dorothy Stone	With Spencer Tracy and George Raft
1931	Riders of the Purple Sage	Jane Withersteen	With future husband George O'Brien
1931	Ambassador Bill	Queen Vanya	With Will Rogers
1932	Forgotten Commandments	Marya Ossipoff	
1933	Girl Without a Room	Kay Loring	With Charles Farrell and Charlie Ruggles
1935	Without Children	Sue Cole	
1935	Speed Devils	Pat Corey	
1936	Man Hunt	Jane Carpenter	
1936	The Walking Dead	Nancy	With Boris Karloff
1936	Dracula's Daughter	Janet	With Edward Van Sloan
1936	Murder by an Aristocrat	Sally Keating	With Lyle Talbot
1936	The Final Hour	Flo Russell	With Ralph Bellamy
1936	Alibi for Murder	Lois Allen	With William Gargan
1936	Legion of Terror	Nancy Foster	
1950	Bunco Squad	Barbara Madison	
