= The Big Trail =

1930 film by Raoul Walsh

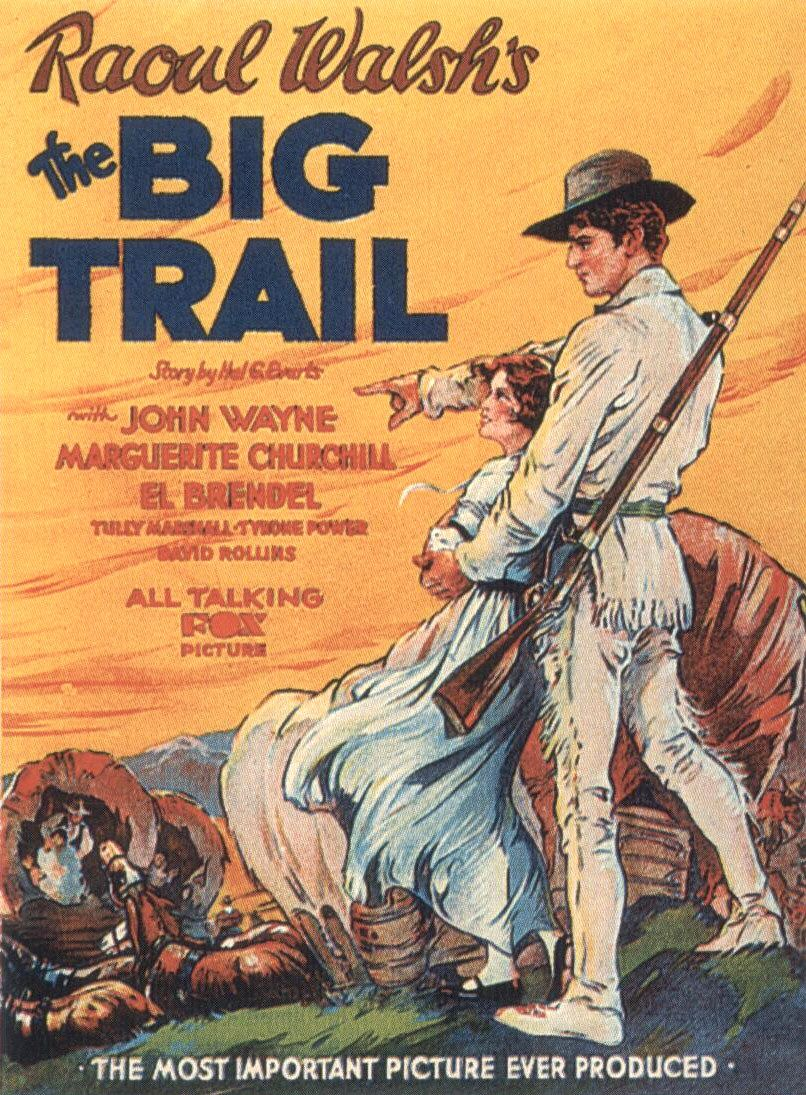
- Theatrical release poster
- Directed by: Raoul Walsh
- Screenplay by: Jack Peabody; Marie Boyle; Florence Postal; Fred Serser
- Story by: Hal G. Evarts
- Based on: The California and Oregon Trail; 1849 book by Francis Parkman, Jr.
- Produced by: Raoul Walsh
- Starring: John Wayne; Marguerite Churchill; El Brendel; Tully Marshall; Tyrone Power; David Rollins
- Cinematography: Lucien Andriot; Arthur Edeson
- Edited by: Jack Dennis
- Music by: (all uncredited); R. H. Bassett; Peter Brunelli; Alfred Dalby; Arthur Kay; Jack Virgil
- Production company: Fox Film Corporation
- Distributed by: Fox Film Corporation
- Release date: November 1, 1930
- Running time: 122 min. 70mm version 108 min. 35mm version
- Country: United States
- Language: English
- Budget: $1,250,000

The Big Trail is a 1930 American epic pre-Code Western early widescreen film shot on location across the American West starring 23-year-old John Wayne in his first leading role and directed by Raoul Walsh. It is the final completed film to feature Tyrone Power Sr. before his death in 1931, as well as his only sound role.

In 2006, the United States Library of Congress deemed this film "culturally, historically, or aesthetically significant", and selected it for preservation in the National Film Registry, saying "the plot of a trek along the Oregon Trail is aided immensely by the majestic sweep provided by the experimental 70mm Grandeur wide-screen process used in filming". Fox officials told Walsh that its opening scenes were the greatest filmed in Hollywood to that point.

== Plot ==
The widescreen (left) and fullscreen (right) versions of The Big Trail

A large caravan of settlers attempts to cross the Western United States on the Oregon Trail. Breck Coleman is a young trapper who just got back to Missouri from his travels near Santa Fe, seeking to avenge the death of an old trapper friend who was killed the winter before along the Santa Fe Trail for his furs, by Red Flack and his minion Lopez. At a large trading post owned by a man named Wellmore, Coleman sees Flack and suspects him right away as being one of the killers. Flack likewise suspects Coleman as being somebody who knows too much about the killing. Coleman is asked by a large group of settlers to scout their caravan west, and declines, until he learns that Flack and Lopez were just hired by Wellmore to boss a bull train along the as-yet-unblazed Oregon Trail to a trading post in northern Oregon Territory (which at the time extended into current British Columbia), owned by another Missouri fur trader. Coleman agrees to scout for the train, so he can keep an eye on the villains and kill them as soon as they reach their destination. The caravan of settlers in their covered wagons follow Wellmore's ox-drawn train of Conestoga wagons, as the first major group of settlers to move west on the Oregon Trail. Along the way the wagon train is attacked by a horde of Cheyenne Indians on horseback, wearing headdresses.

Coleman finds love with young Ruth Cameron, whom he'd kissed accidentally, mistaking her for somebody else. Unwilling to accept her attraction toward him, Ruth gets rather close to a gambler acquaintance of Flack's, who joined the trail after being caught cheating. Coleman and Flack have to lead the settlers west, while Flack does everything he can to have Coleman killed before he finds any proof of what he'd done. The three villains' main reason for going west is to avoid the hangman's noose for previous crimes, and all three receive frontier justice instead. The settlers trail ends in an unnamed valley, where Coleman and Ruth finally settle down together amidst giant redwoods.

== Cast ==
Cast publicity photos

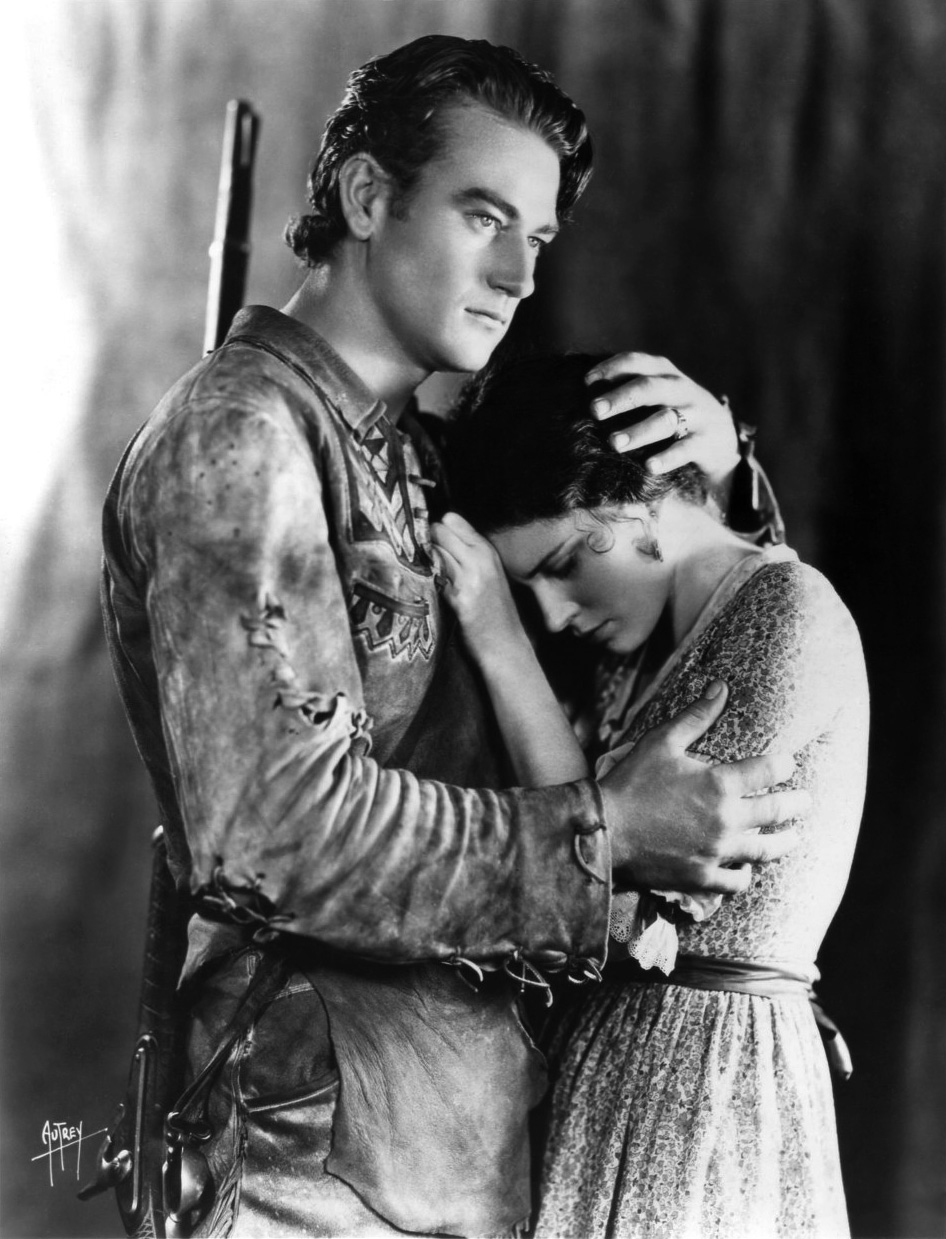
John Wayne and Marguerite Churchill

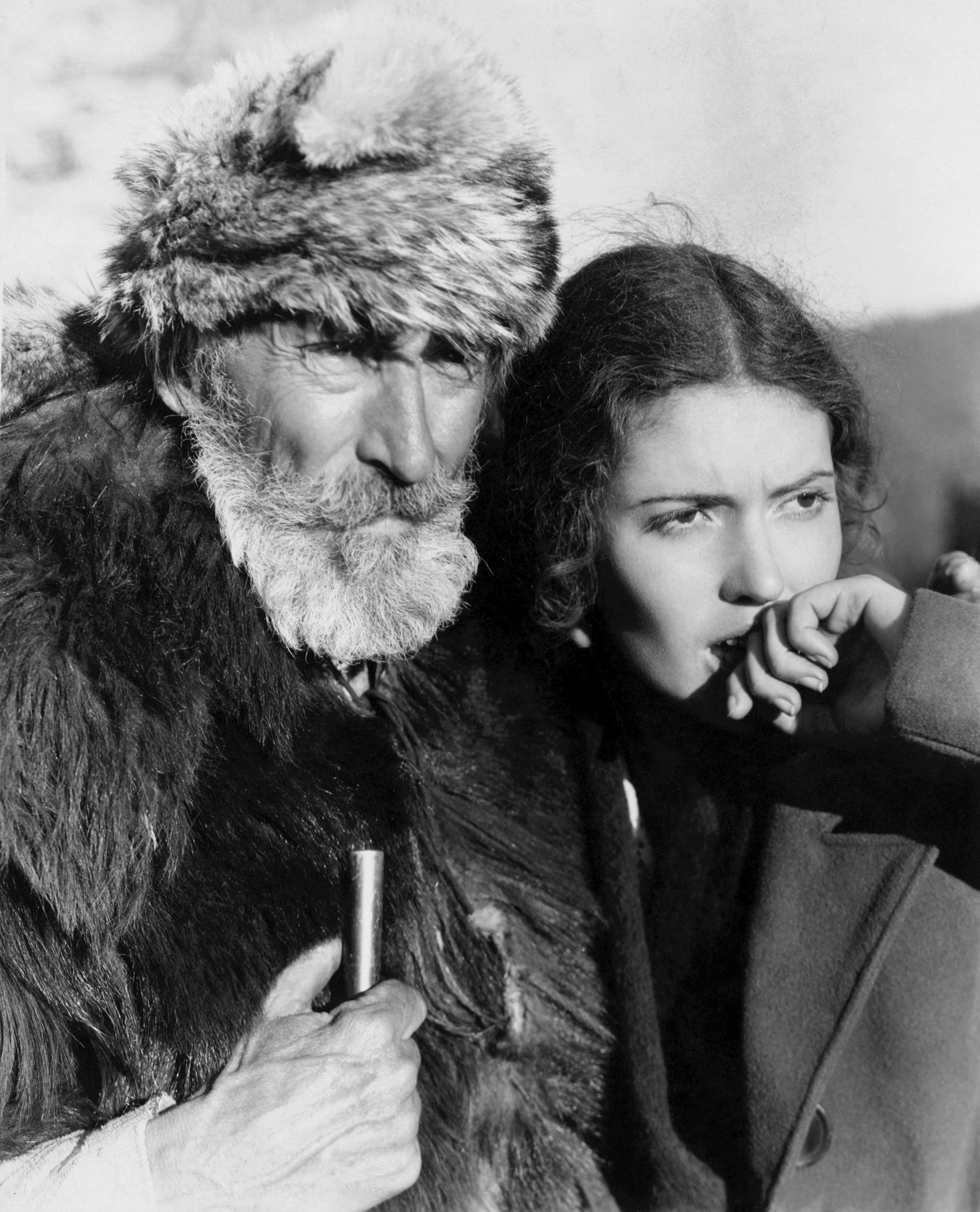
Tully Marshall and Churchill

- John Wayne as Breck Coleman
- Marguerite Churchill as Ruth Cameron
- El Brendel as Gus
- Tully Marshall as Zeke
- Tyrone Power Sr. as Red Flack (as Tyrone Power)
- David Rollins as Dave Cameron
- Frederick Burton as Pa Bascom
- Ian Keith as Bill Thorpe
- Charles Stevens as Lopez
- Ward Bond as Sid Bascom
- Louise Carver as Gus's mother-in-law
- Russ Powell as Windy Bill
- William V. Mong as Wellmore

== Pre-production ==
Reputedly (the claim is unconfirmed) the initial script, then called The Oregon Trail, was first offered to director John Ford, who then passed it on to his friend Raoul Walsh.

For the film, Walsh employed 93 actors and used as many as 725 natives from five different Indian tribes. He also obtained 185 wagons, 1,800 cows, 1,400 horses, 500 buffalos and 700 chickens, pigs and dogs for the production of the film.

== Production ==
The shoot lasted from April 20 to August 20, 1930, and was filmed in seven states. The film was shot in an early widescreen process called 70 mm Grandeur film, which was first used in the film Fox Movietone Follies of 1929. Grandeur was used by the Fox Film Corporation for a handful of films released in 1929 and 1930, of which The Big Trail was the last. Grandeur proved financially nonviable for an industry still investing in the switch to talking pictures.

The scene of the wagon train drive across the country was pioneering in its use of camera work and the depth and view of the epic landscape. An effort was made to lend authenticity to the movie, with the wagons drawn by oxen instead of horses – they were lowered by ropes down canyons when necessary for certain shots in narrow valleys. Tyrone Power Sr.'s character's clothing looks realistically grimy, and even the food supplies the 'immigrants' carried with them in their wagons were thoroughly researched. Locations in five states, starting from New Mexico to California, were used to film the caravan's 2,000-mile (3,200 km) trek. The final scenes filmed on location were a buffalo stampede filmed near Moiese, Montana.

== Release and reception ==
Lobby cards

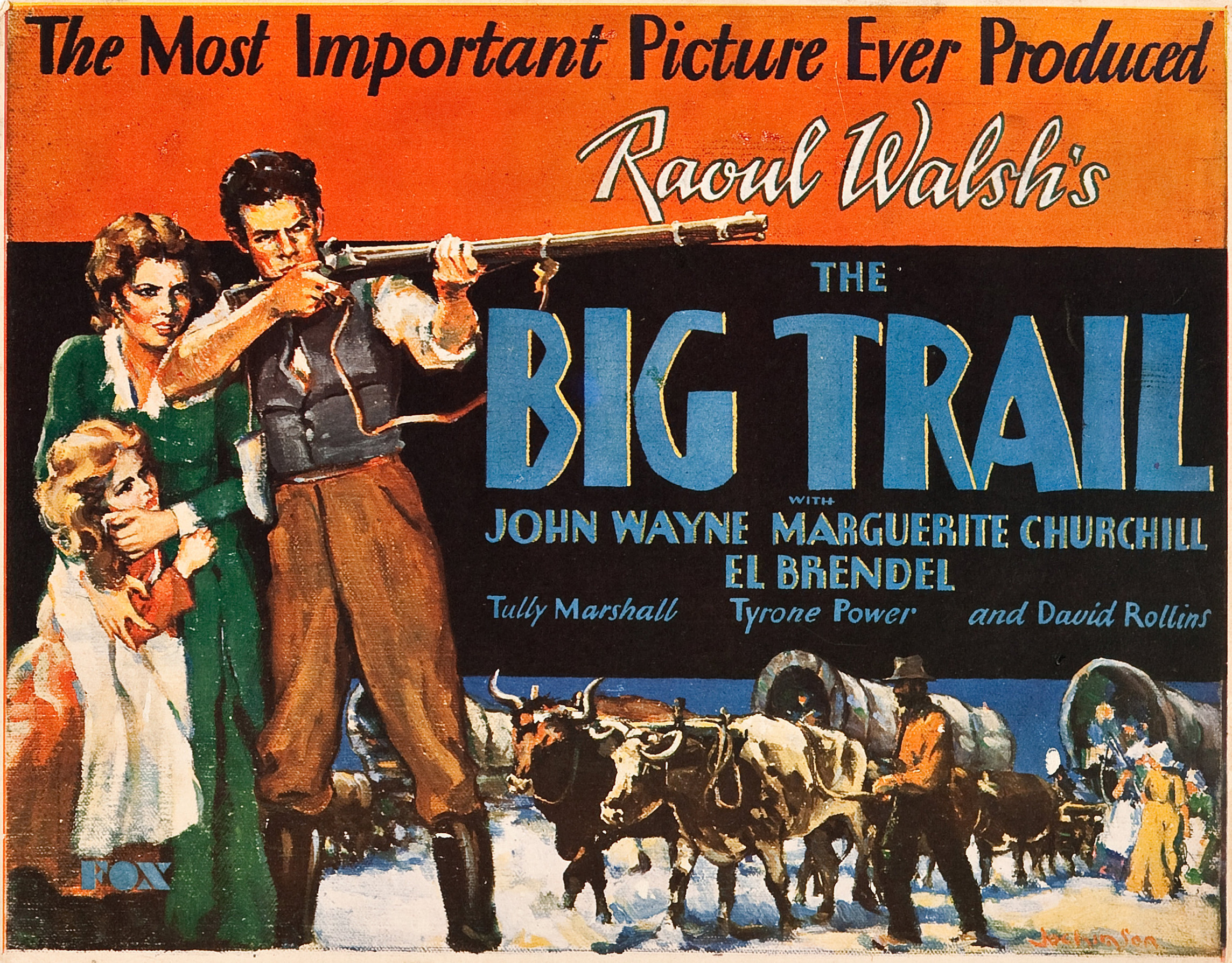

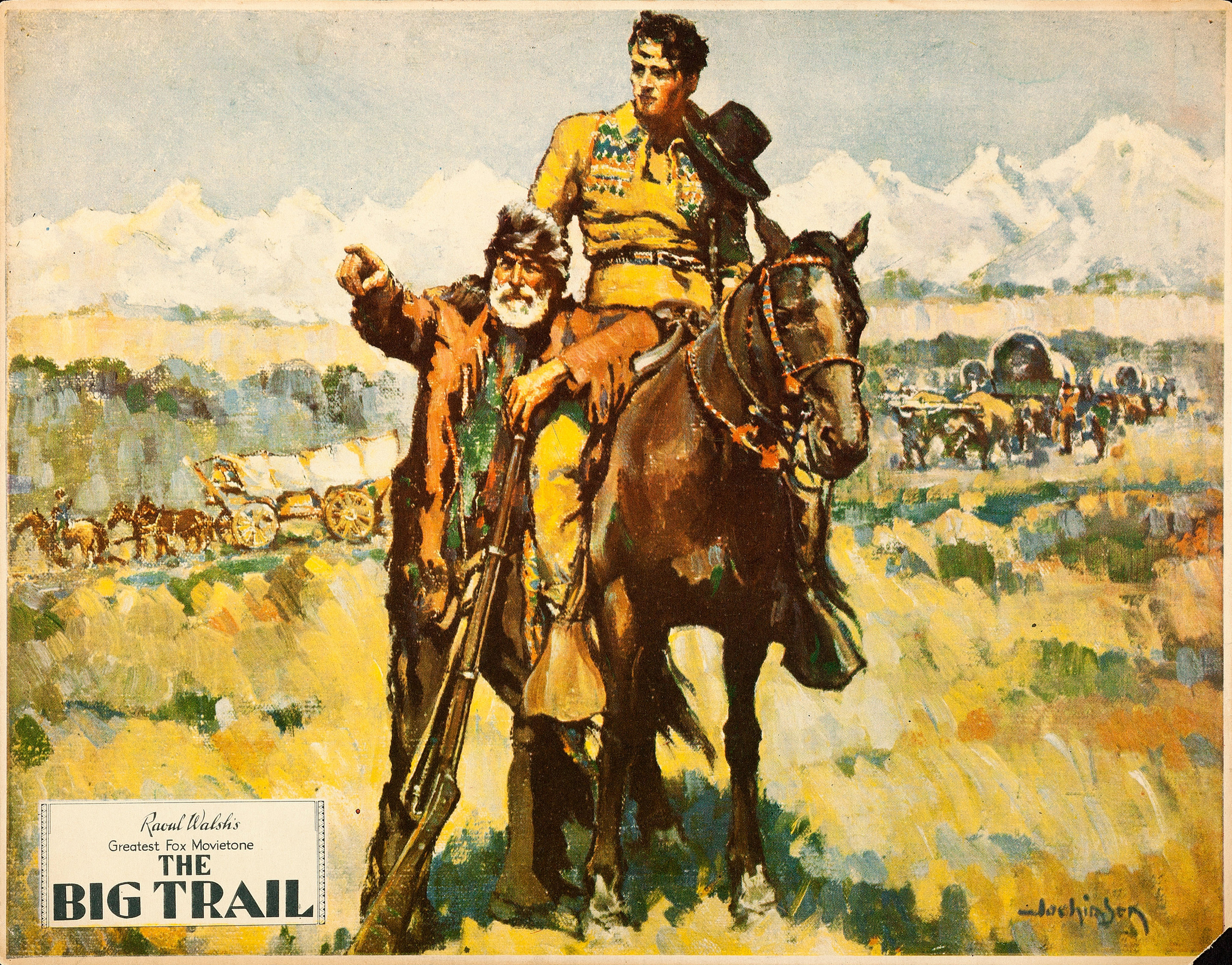

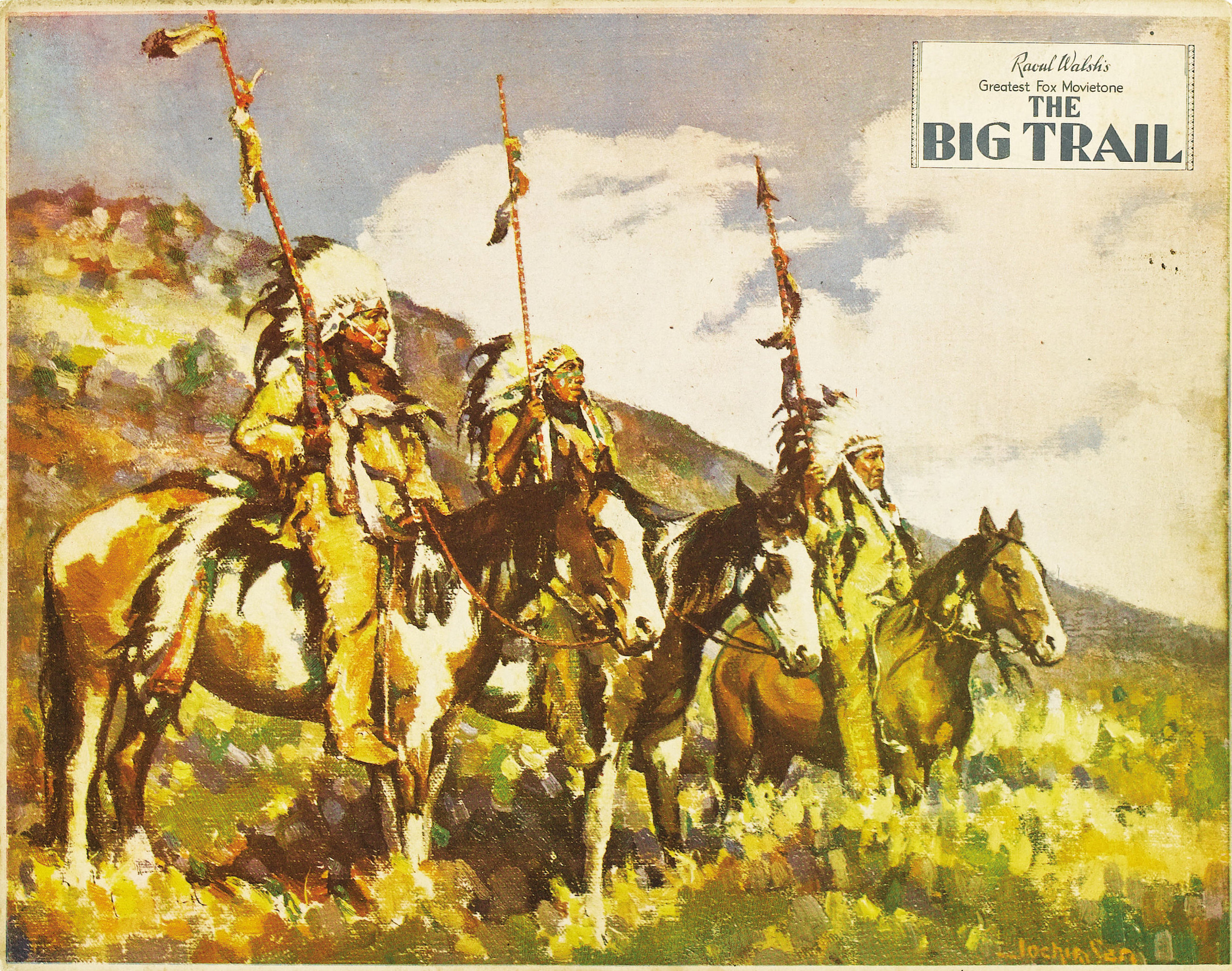

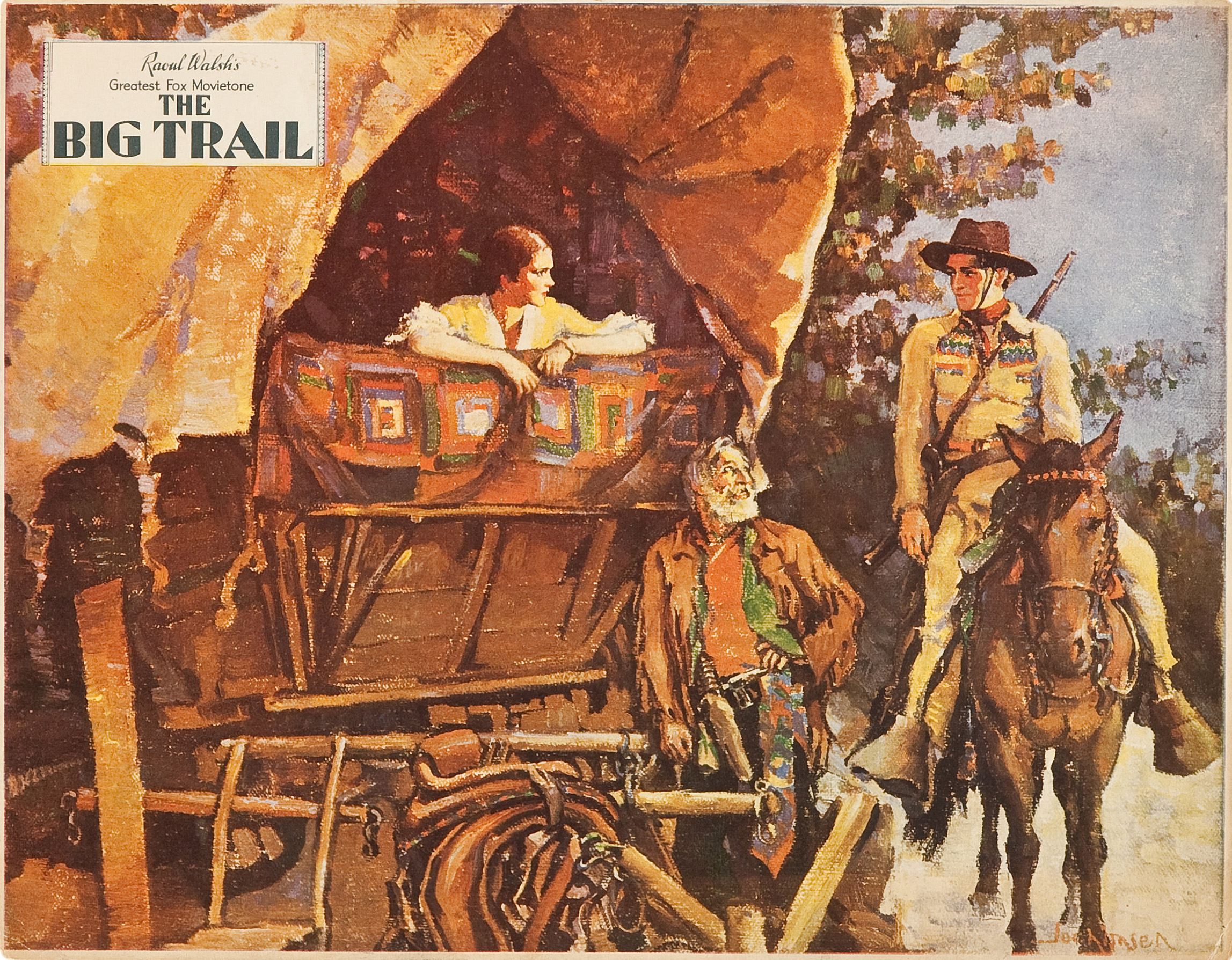

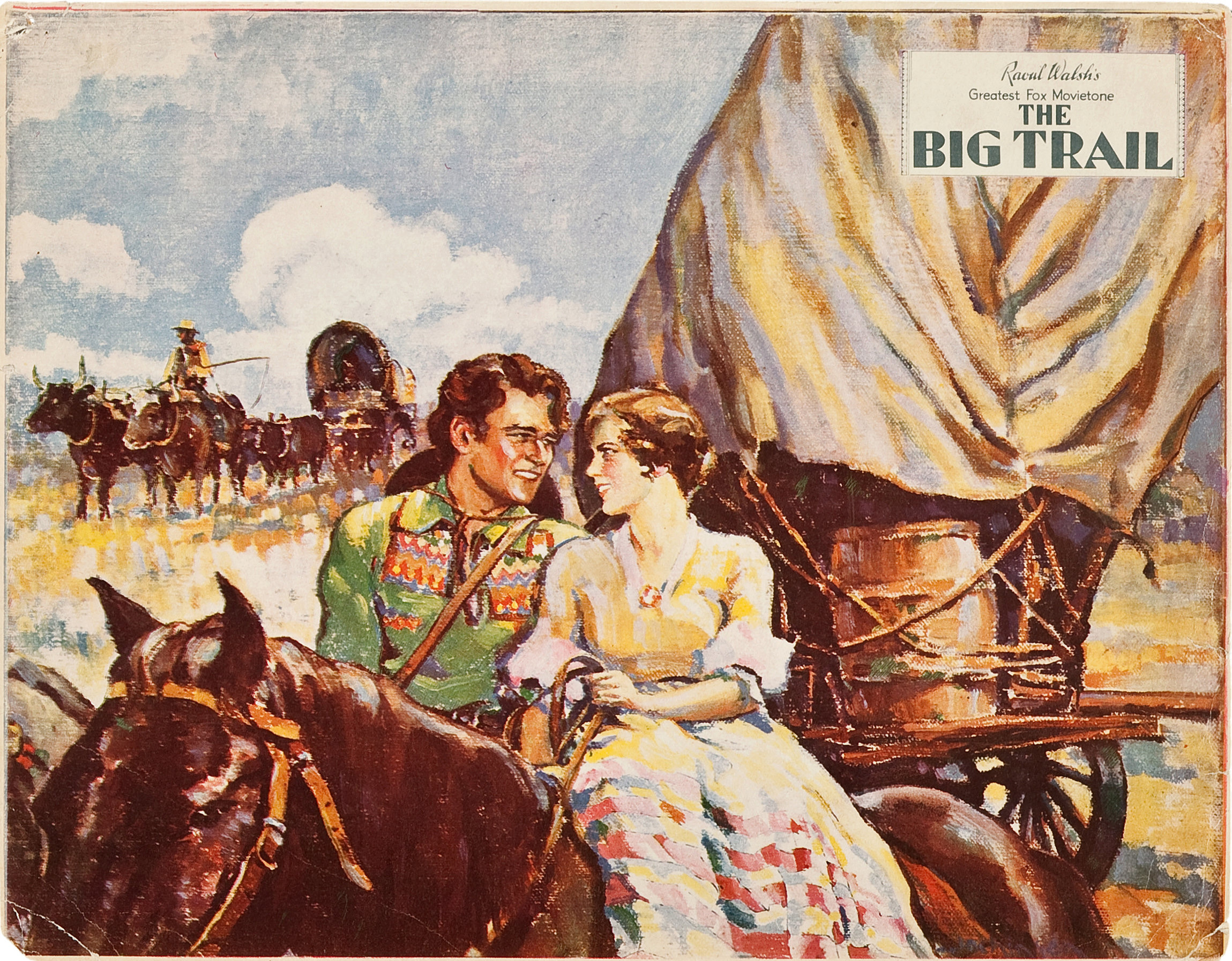

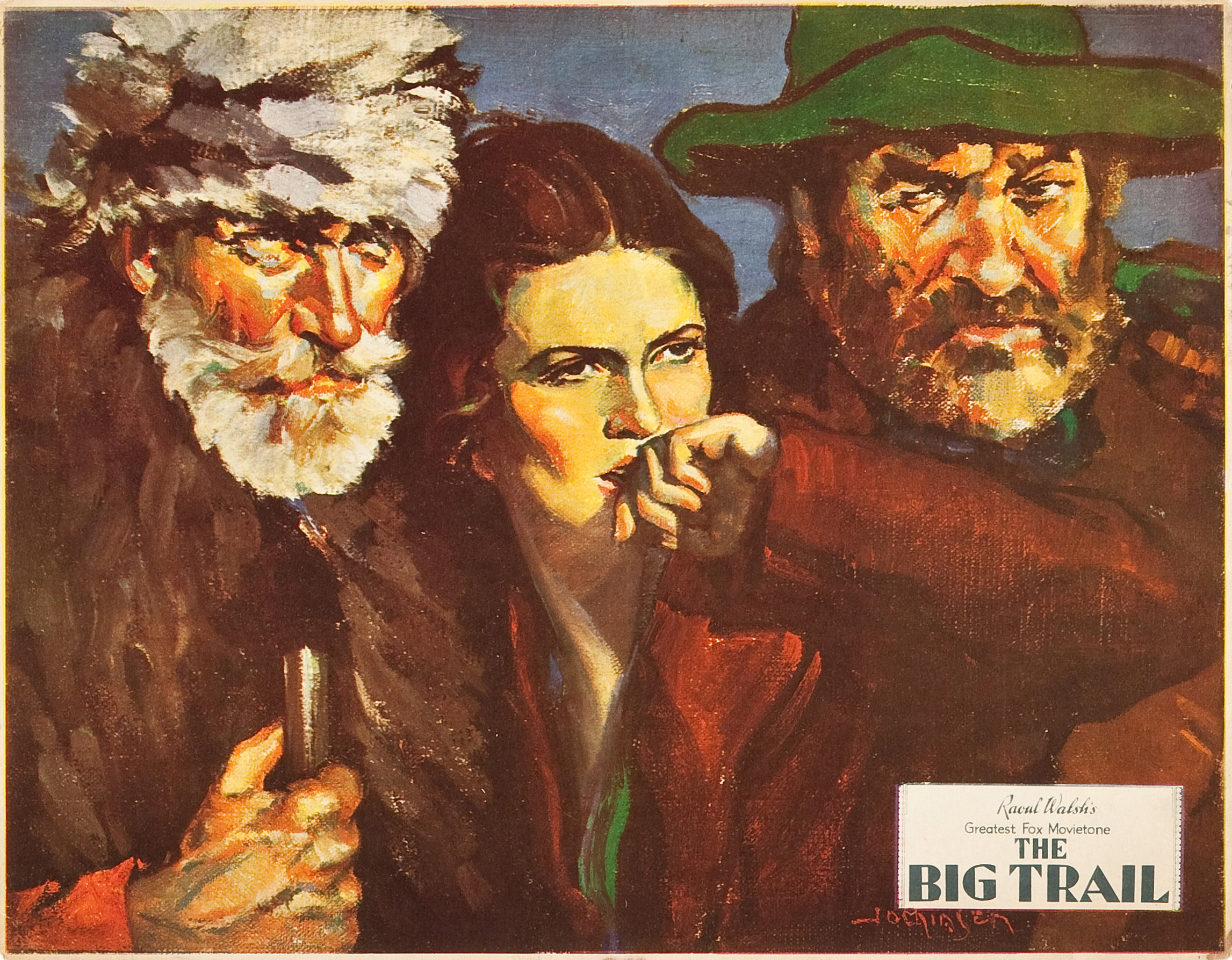

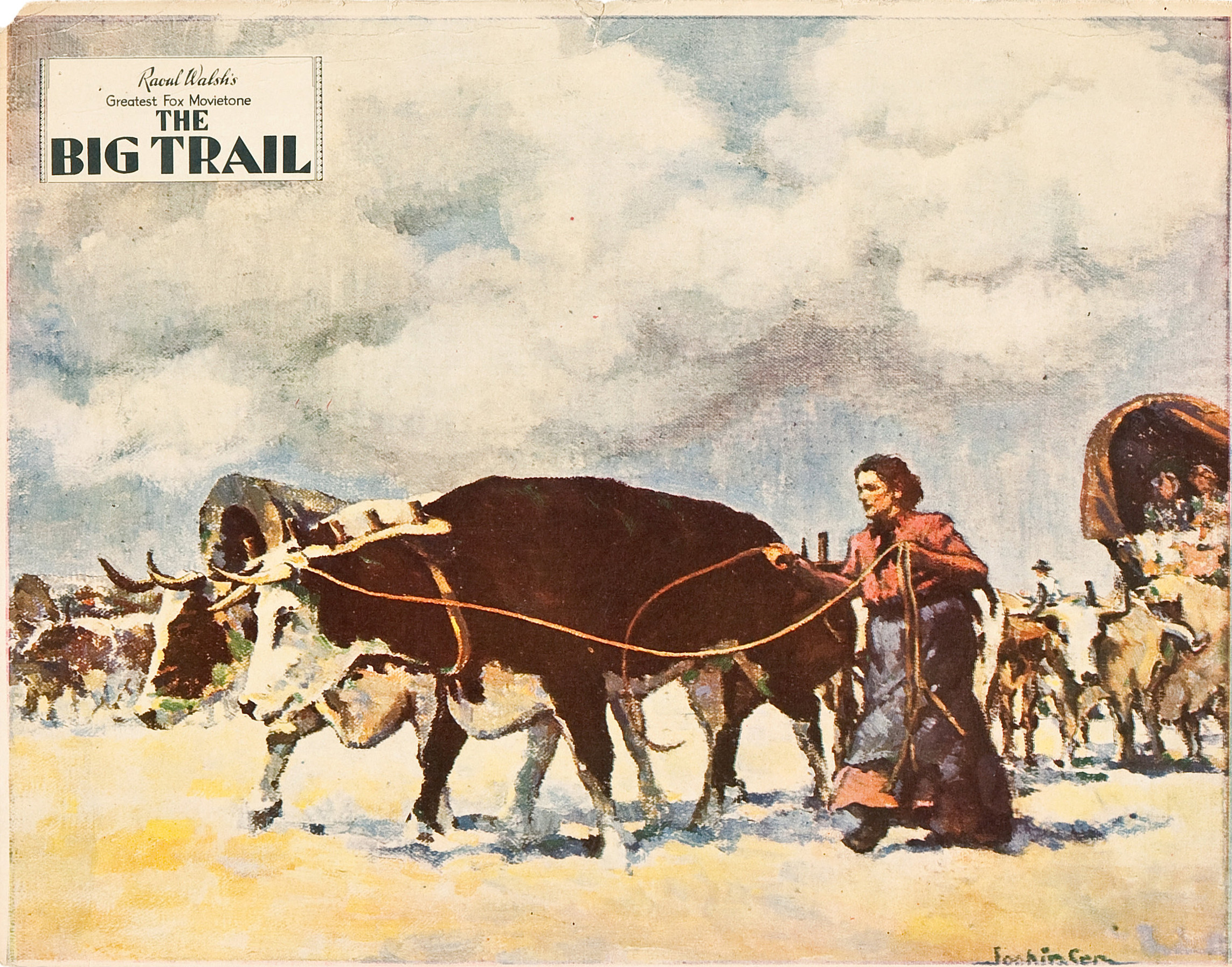

After shooting, the film was previewed to select audiences and generally released in October 1930. "Often the scenes" in the film, wrote Mordaunt Hall in The New York Times "cause one to marvel at their naturalness and beauty. It has a thunderstorm that looks as real as the land, water and sky that confront one throughout this production". According to Hall, in one sequence, featuring a native American attack, "suddenly it seems as though one were tugged from one's seat and thrown in front of the charging horses, which appear to plunge from the screen and disappear into the velvety darkness of the theatre".

After the box-office failure of the film due to the Depression stopping theatres from investing in widescreen technology, Wayne was only cast in low-budget serials and features (mostly Poverty Row Westerns); although his name was billed above the title in dozens of movies in the 1930s. He enjoyed a large following, especially in the South, but it took Wayne's role in Stagecoach (1939) for him to become a mainstream performer again.

== The two versions ==
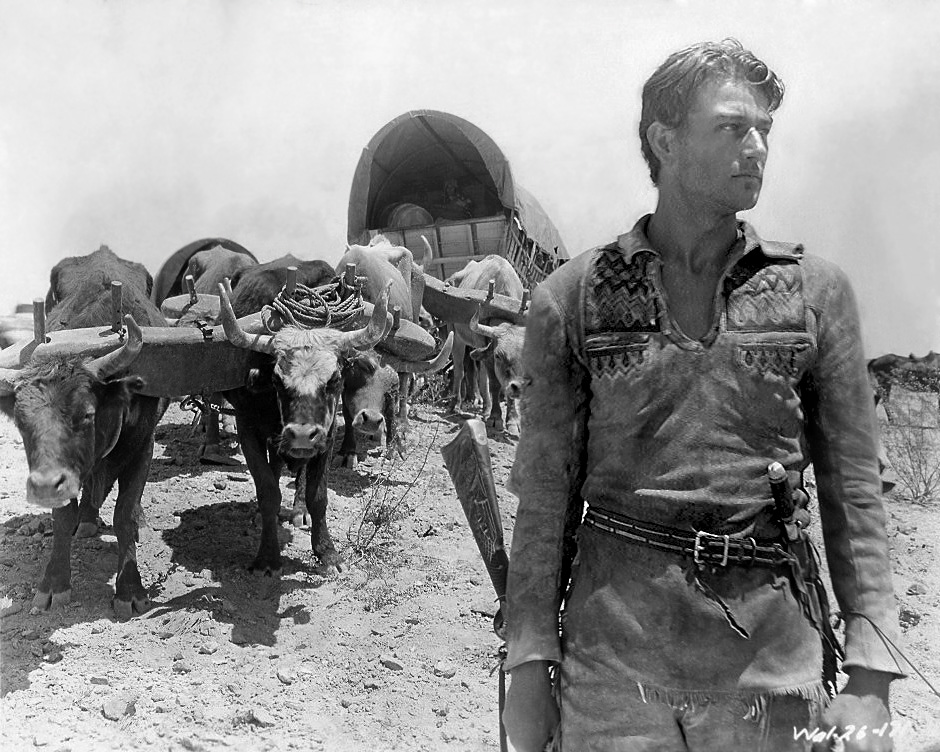
John Wayne in The Big Trail

Beyond the format difference, the 70mm and 35mm versions vary substantially from each other. They were shot by different cameras, and footage for each format was edited separately in the cutting room. Some scenes were shot simultaneously by both cameras, the only difference being the angle (with the better angle usually given to the 70mm camera). Some scenes were shot first by one camera, and then retaken with the other camera. The 70mm cameras could not focus well up close, so their shots were mainly panoramas with very few close-ups. The 35mm cameras could move in and focus at short distances. Thus, scenes in the 70mm version might show two characters talking to each other in the same take, making greater use of the widescreen frame, while the 35mm version would have close-up shots cutting back and forth between the two characters. This may have been an artistic choice as much as a technical one. The cinematographer responsible for the 70mm version of the picture, Arthur Edeson, wrote in the September 1930 issue of American Cinematographer: "Grandeur reduces the number of close-ups considerably, as the figures are so much larger that semi-close-ups are usually all that is needed".

== Critics views ==
As of 2025, Rotten Tomatoes gives the film a 100% rating based on 9 reviews.

== Preservation and re-release ==
A neglected film for many years, it was only seen in the conventional 35mm version for decades. In the early 1980s, the Museum of Modern Art in New York City, which held the original 70mm nitrate camera negative, wished to preserve the film but found that nitrate decomposition had left it too shrunken and fragile to be copied to safety film, and that no film lab would touch it. Over a year-long project, Karl Malkames, a specialist in film restoration technology, designed and built a special printer to preserve this version of the film. The image on the original negative was transferred to a 35mm anamorphic master.

Dave Kehr wrote for the Chicago Tribune in 1988: "The added richness of resolution and the silvery sheen that the first generation 70 mm. nitrate prints would have provided can only be imagined. And yet, The Big Trail remains an eye-popping experience".

== Home media ==
The 70mm version was finally seen on cable television in the late 1990s. The 35mm version had been released to VHS and DVD previously for several years. A two-disc restored DVD was released in the U.S. on May 13, 2008, featuring the 35 and 70-millimeter versions. A Blu-ray edition featuring the 70-millimeter version was released in September 2012.

The film's copyright was renewed, so the film finally entered the public domain in 2026.

== Foreign-language versions ==
A fairly common practice in the early sound era was to simultaneously produce at least one foreign-language version of a film for release in non-English-speaking countries; an approach later replaced by simply dubbing the dialogue. There were at least four foreign-language versions made of The Big Trail, all filmed in 35mm, 1.20:1 ratio and using different casts and different character names:

- French: La Piste des géants (1931), directed by Pierre Couderc, starring Gaston Glass (Pierre Calmine), Jeanne Helbling (Denise Vernon), Margot Rousseroy (Yvette), Raoul Paoli (Flack), Louis Mercier (Lopez).
- German: Die Große Fahrt (1931), directed by Lewis Seiler and Raoul Walsh, starring Theo Shall (Bill Coleman), Marion Lessing (Ruth Winter), Ullrich Haupt (Thorpe), Arnold Korff (Peter), Anders Van Haden (Bull Flack), Peter Erkelenz (Fichte), Paul Panzer (Lopez). Die Große Fahrt at IMDb
- Italian: Il grande sentiero (1931), starring Franco Corsaro and Luisa Caselotti. (Note: Luisa Caselotti's younger sister, Adriana Caselotti, was the voice of Snow White in Walt Disney's animated classic Snow White and the Seven Dwarfs (1937).)
- Spanish: La Gran jornada (1931), directed by David Howard, Samuel Schneider, and Raoul Walsh, starring Jorge Lewis (Raul Coleman), Carmen Guerrero (Isabel Prados), Roberto Guzmán (Tomas), Martin Garralaga (Martin), Al Ernest Garcia (Flack), Tito Davison (Daniel), Carlos Villarías (Note: Villarías is best known for playing the title character in the Spanish-language version of Drácula (1931).) (Orena), Charles Stevens (Note: Stevens plays the same part in both the English and Spanish versions of The Big Trail.) (Lopez). La Gran jornada at IMDb

== See also ==
- John Wayne filmography
- List of American films of 1930
