= Early widescreen feature filmography =

A widescreen aspect ratio was first seen in a movie in Paramount's Old Ironsides of 1926. A few years later in 1928 and '29, a fad broke out for such special features as widescreen and color. Color was the more common choice, being that it was projected the same as black and white while theaters needed wider screens and special lenses for their projectors to show widescreen movies. With the lack of a standard for widescreen aspect ratios, studios had to go to the expense of filming several versions of a widescreen movie to cover the more common kinds of projector lens. The first movie to combine the two was Fox Movietone Follies of 1929, widescreen and partially in color. The next year, there were two, Song of the Flame and Kismet, which are today both lost films. By late 1930, however, most of the planned widescreen movies were shelved as studios began to feel the effects of The Great Depression and were forced to economize.

In 1953, 20th Century Fox returned to the concept and began using the CinemaScope process to make widescreen movies, such as The Robe and How to Marry a Millionaire. Widescreen grew in popularity during the 1950s, and since 1960, nearly every American feature film has been widescreen.

== List ==
BW stands for black and white.

Title	Year	Color	Company	Information
Old Ironsides	1926	BW, silent	Paramount Pictures	Fullscreen with widescreen sequences.
The Trail of '98	1928	BW, silent	MGM	This movie still survives and is available on DVD in The Warner Archive Collection.
Fox Movietone Follies of 1929	1929	BW, part color (Multicolor)	Fox Movie Corporation	This is a lost film.
Happy Days	1929	BW	Fox Movie Corp.	Only survives in a fullscreen copy that was shot at the same time as the widescreen version. No widescreen prints are known to survive.
Song of the Flame	1930	Color (Technicolor)	Warner Bros.	Fullscreen with one widescreen sequence. A lost film with only the full soundtrack surviving.
Danger Lights	1930	BW	RKO Radio Pictures	Only two theaters showed the widescreen version of this movie, only the fullscreen version survives.
Kismet	1930	BW, part color (Technicolor)	Warner Bros.	Loretta Young's first widescreen movie. Today Kismet is a lost film, having been banned in America in 1935.
Billy the Kid	1930	BW	Metro-Goldwyn-Mayer	Only survives in a fullscreen copy shot at the same time as the widescreen version.
The Big Trail	1930	BW	Fox Movie Corporation	John Wayne's first starring role in a movie. Still survives in widescreen and is available on DVD.
The Bat Whispers	1930	BW	United Artists	Still survives in fullscreen and widescreen versions.
The Great Meadow	1931	BW	MGM	Unknown if it was released in widescreen due to the decline of widescreen to the movie going public. Also unknown to survive.

== See also ==
- List of early color feature films
- Cinerama
