= Myrna Loy filmography =

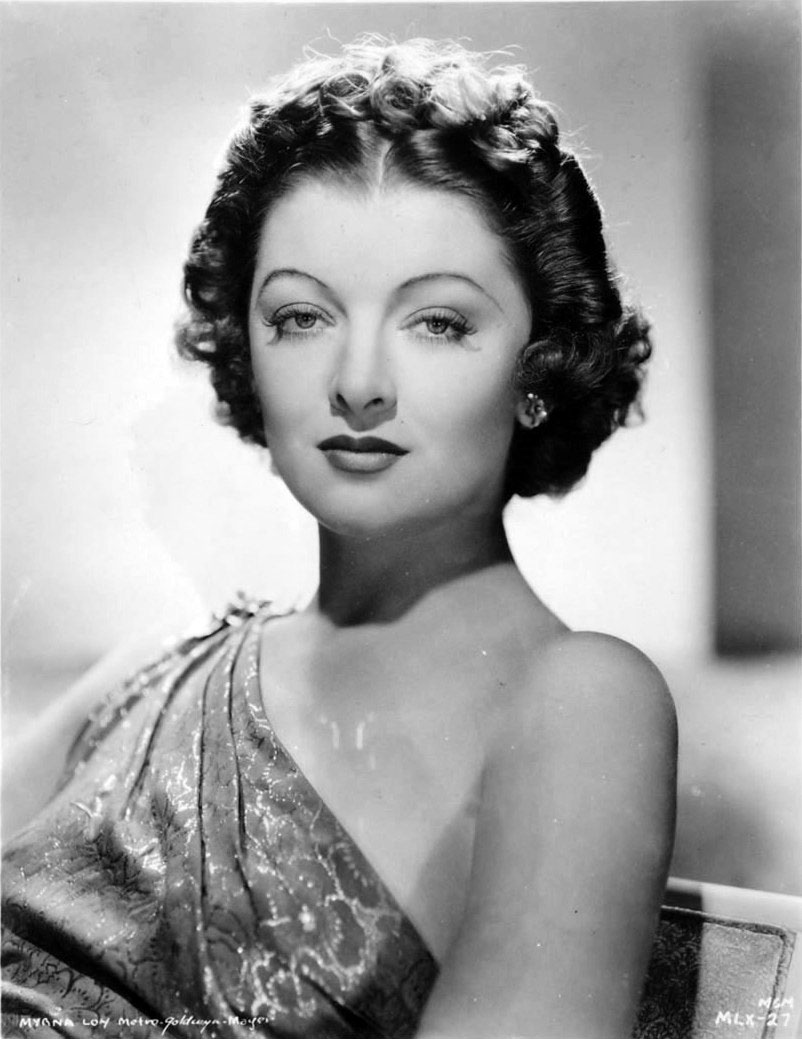
Myrna Loy publicity portrait

The Myrna Loy filmography presents a chronology of the motion picture and television appearances of actress Myrna Loy. All of Loy's films released prior to The Desert Song (1929) were silent, except where noted. All of Loy's films were produced in the United States, except for That Dangerous Age (1949), which was produced in Great Britain. Her television credits are also listed.

== Film ==
Year	Title	Role	Director	Other Players	Notes
=== 1925–1929 ===
1925	What Price Beauty?	Vamp	Tom Buckingham	Nita Naldi, Natacha Rambova	released January 22, 1928; Lost film
1925	The Wanderer	Girl at Baccanal (uncredited)	Raoul Walsh	Greta Nissen, Wallace Beery	Incomplete film
1925	Pretty Ladies	Ziegfeld Girl (uncredited)	Monta Bell	ZaSu Pitts, Tom Moore, Ann Pennington	Film survives, but Technicolor sequences are lost
1925	Sporting Life	Chorus Girl with Lord Wainwright (uncredited)	Maurice Tourneur	Bert Lytell, Marian Nixon	
1925	Ben-Hur: A Tale of the Christ	Slave Girl (uncredited)	Fred Niblo	Ramon Novarro, Francis X. Bushman, May McAvoy	Technicolor sequences, cut from the film
1926	The Caveman	Maid	Lewis Milestone	Matt Moore	
1926	The Love Toy	Bit Part (uncredited)	Erle C. Kenton	Lowell Sherman	Lost film
1926	Why Girls Go Back Home	Sally Short	James Flood	Patsy Ruth Miller, Clive Brook	Lost film
1926	The Gilded Highway	Inez Quartz	J. Stuart Blackton	Dorothy Devore	Lost film
1926	The Exquisite Sinner	Living statue	Phil Rosen; Josef von Sternberg	Conrad Nagel, Renée Adorée	
1926	So This Is Paris	Maid	Ernst Lubitsch	Monte Blue, Patsy Ruth Miller	
1926	Don Juan (soundtrack—music and sound effects)	Mai, Lady in Waiting	Alan Crosland	John Barrymore, Mary Astor	
1926	Across the Pacific	Roma	Roy Del Ruth	Monte Blue	Lost film
1926	The Third Degree	Bit part (uncredited)	Michael Curtiz	Dolores Costello	
1927	Finger Prints	Vamp	Lloyd Bacon	Louise Fazenda, Helene Costello	Lost film
1927	When a Man Loves; His Lady (UK title) (soundtrack—music and sound effects)	Convict behind Manon (uncredited)	Alan Crosland	John Barrymore, Dolores Costello	
1927	Bitter Apples	Belinda White	Harry O. Hoyt	Monte Blue	Lost film
1927	The Climbers	Countess Veya	Paul L. Stein	Irene Rich	Lost film
1927	Simple Sis	Edith Van	Herman C. Raymaker	Louise Fazenda, Clyde Cook	Lost film
1927	The Heart of Maryland	Mulatta	Lloyd Bacon	Dolores Costello	Incomplete film
1927	A Sailor's Sweetheart	Claudette Ralston	Lloyd Bacon	Louise Fazenda, Clyde Cook	Incomplete film
1927	The Jazz Singer (Part Talkie)	Chorus girl (uncredited)	Alan Crosland	Al Jolson, May McAvoy	
1927	The Girl from Chicago	Mary Carlton	Ray Enright	Conrad Nagel	Lost film
1927	If I Were Single	Joan Whitley	Roy Del Ruth	May McAvoy, Conrad Nagel	
1927	Ham and Eggs at the Front	Fifi	Roy Del Ruth	Tom Wilson, Louise Fazenda	
1928	Beware of Married Men	Juanita Sheldon	Archie Mayo	Irene Rich, Clyde Cook	Lost film, only 4th reel survives
1928	A Girl in Every Port	Girl in China (uncredited)	Howard Hawks	Victor McLaglen, Robert Armstrong, Louise Brooks	
1928	Turn Back the Hours	Tiza Torreon	Howard Bretherton	Walter Pidgeon	
1928	The Crimson City	Isobel / State Street Sadie	Archie Mayo	Conrad Nagel	
1928	Pay as You Enter (soundtrack—music and sound effects)	Yvonne De Russo	Lloyd Bacon	Louise Fazenda, Clyde Cook	Lost film
1928	State Street Sadie; The Girl from State Street (UK) (Part Talkie)	Isobel	Archie Mayo	Conrad Nagel	Lost film
1928	The Midnight Taxi	Gertie Fairfax	John G. Adolfi	Antonio Moreno, Helene Costello	Silent version survives, but the talkie version is presumed lost
1928	Noah's Ark (Part Talkie)	Dancer / Slave Girl	Michael Curtiz	Dolores Costello, George O'Brien, Noah Beery	A 108-minute version of the film survives, but the original 2 hour and 15 minute version is lost
1929	Fancy Baggage (Part Talkie)	Myrna	John G. Adolfi	Audrey Ferris	Lost film
1929	Hardboiled Rose (Part Talkie)	Rose Duhamel	F. Harmon Weight	William Collier Jr.	Film survives, but the soundtrack is lost, save for the fourth disc
1929	The Desert Song	Azuri	Roy Del Ruth	John Boles, Carlotta King	Technicolor sequences are lost, only black and white version exists
1929	The Black Watch; King of the Khyber Rifles (UK)	Yasmani	John Ford	Victor McLaglen	
1929	The Squall	Nubi	Alexander Korda	Alice Joyce, Loretta Young	
1929	The Great Divide	Manuella	Reginald Barker	Dorothy Mackaill, Ian Keith	
1929	Evidence	Native Girl	John G. Adolfi	Pauline Frederick	Film is lost, but soundtrack survives
1929	The Show of Shows	Herself ("What Became of the Floradora Boys" and "Chinese Fantasy" numbers)	John G. Aldolphi	All-Star Cast	Technicolor
=== 1930–1934 ===
1930	Cameo Kirby	Lea	Irving Cummings	J. Harold Murray, Norma Terris	
1930	Isle of Escape	Moira	Howard Bretherton	Monte Blue	Lost film, only a 40-second fragment exists
1930	Under a Texas Moon	Lolita Romero	Michael Curtiz	Frank Fay	Technicolor
1930	Cock o' the Walk	Narita	Walter Lang; Roy William Neill	Joseph Schildkraut	Lost film
1930	Bride of the Regiment; Lady of the Rose (UK)	Sophie	John Francis Dillon	Vivienne Segal	Technicolor, lost film, only soundtrack survives
1930	The Last of the Duanes	Lola Bland	Alfred L. Werker	George O'Brien	
1930	The Jazz Cinderella; Love Is Like That (UK)	Mildred Vane	Scott Pembroke	Jason Robards, Sr.	
1930	The Bad Man	Bit Part	Clarence G. Badger	Walter Huston	Incomplete film; one reel is missing
1930	Renegades	Eleanore	Victor Fleming	Warner Baxter, Noah Beery, Bela Lugosi	
1930	The Truth About Youth	Kara - the Firefly	William A. Seiter	Loretta Young, David Manners	
1930	Rogue of the Rio Grande	Carmita	Spencer Gordon Bennet	José Bohr	
1930	The Devil to Pay!	Mary Crayle	George Fitzmaurice	Ronald Colman, Loretta Young	
1931	The Naughty Flirt	Linda Gregory	Edward F. Cline	Alice White	
1931	Body and Soul	Alice Lester	Alfred Santell	Charles Farrell, Elissa Landi, Humphrey Bogart	
1931	A Connecticut Yankee; The Yankee at King Arthur's Court (UK)	Morgan le Fay	David Butler	Will Rogers	
1931	Hush Money	Flo Curtis	Sidney Lanfield	Joan Bennett	
1931	Rebound	Evie Lawrence	Edward H. Griffith	Ina Claire	
1931	Transatlantic	Kay Graham	William K. Howard	Edmund Lowe, Lois Moran	
1931	Skyline	Paula Lambert	Sam Taylor	Thomas Meighan, Maureen O'Sullivan	
1931	Consolation Marriage	Elaine Brandon	Paul Sloane	Irene Dunne, Pat O'Brien	
1931	Arrowsmith	Mrs. Joyce Lanyon	John Ford	Ronald Colman, Helen Hayes	
1932	Emma	Countess Isabelle "Izzy" Smith Marlin	Clarence Brown	Marie Dressler	
1932	Vanity Fair	Becky Sharp	Chester M. Franklin	Conway Tearle	
1932	The Wet Parade	Eileen Pinchon	Victor Fleming	Walter Huston	
1932	The Woman in Room 13	Sari Loder	Henry King	Elissa Landi, Ralph Bellamy	
1932	New Morals for Old	Myra	Charles Brabin	Robert Young	
1932	Love Me Tonight	Countess Valentine	Rouben Mamoulian	Maurice Chevalier, Jeanette MacDonald	
1932	Thirteen Women	Ursula Georgi	George Archainbaud	Irene Dunne, Peg Entwistle	
1932	The Mask of Fu Manchu	Fah Lo See	Charles Brabin	Boris Karloff	
1932	The Animal Kingdom; The Woman in His House (UK)	Cecilia "Cee" Henry Collier	Edward H. Griffith	Ann Harding, Leslie Howard	
1933	Topaze	Coco	Harry D'Arrast	John Barrymore	
1933	The Barbarian; A Night in Cairo (UK)	Diana "Di" Standing	Sam Wood	Ramon Novarro	
1933	The Prizefighter and the Lady	Belle	W. S. Van Dyke	Max Baer	
1933	When Ladies Meet	Mary Howard	Harry Beaumont	Ann Harding, Robert Montgomery	
1933	Penthouse; Crooks in Clover (UK)	Gertie Waxted	W. S. Van Dyke	Warner Baxter	
1933	Night Flight	Wife of Brazilian pilot	Clarence Brown	John Barrymore, Helen Hayes, Lionel Barrymore, Clark Gable	
1933	Scarlet River	Herself (uncredited)	Otto Brower	Tom Keene	
1934	Men in White	Laura Hudson	Ryszard Boleslawski	Clark Gable	
1934	Manhattan Melodrama	Eleanor Packer	W. S. Van Dyke	Clark Gable, William Powell	
1934	The Thin Man	Nora Charles	W. S. Van Dyke	William Powell	
1934	Stamboul Quest	Annemarie, aka Fräulein Doktor and Helena Bohlen	Sam Wood	George Brent	
1934	Evelyn Prentice	Evelyn Prentice	William K. Howard	William Powell, Rosalind Russell	
1934	Broadway Bill; Strictly Confidential (UK)	Alice Higgins	Frank Capra	Warner Baxter, May Robson	
=== 1935–1939 ===
1935	Wings in the Dark	Sheila Mason	James Flood	Cary Grant	
1935	Whipsaw	Vivian Palmer	Sam Wood	Spencer Tracy	
1936	Wife vs. Secretary	Linda Stanhope	Clarence Brown	Clark Gable, Jean Harlow	
1936	Petticoat Fever	Irene Campton	George Fitzmaurice	Robert Montgomery	
1936	The Great Ziegfeld	Billie Burke	Robert Z. Leonard	William Powell, Luise Rainer	
1936	To Mary - with Love	Mary Wallace	John Cromwell	Warner Baxter	
1936	Libeled Lady	Connie Allenbury	Jack Conway	Jean Harlow, William Powell, Spencer Tracy	
1936	After the Thin Man	Nora Charles	W. S. Van Dyke	William Powell, James Stewart	
1937	Parnell	Mrs. Katie O'Shea	John Stahl	Clark Gable	
1937	Double Wedding	Margit "Baby" Agnew	Richard Thorpe	William Powell	
1938	Man-Proof	Mimi Swift	Richard Thorpe	Franchot Tone, Rosalind Russell, Walter Pidgeon	
1938	Test Pilot	Ann Barton	Victor Fleming	Clark Gable, Spencer Tracy	
1938	Too Hot to Handle	Alma Harding	Jack Conway	Clark Gable, Walter Pidgeon	
1938	Another Romance of Celluloid	Herself (uncredited)			
1939	Lucky Night	Cora Jordan Overton	Norman Taurog	Robert Taylor	
1939	The Rains Came	Lady Edwina Esketh	Clarence Brown	Tyrone Power, George Brent	Sepia
1939	Another Thin Man	Nora Charles	W. S. Van Dyke	William Powell	
1939	Verdensberømtheder i København	Herself			
=== 1940–1949 ===
1940	I Love You Again	Katherine "Kay" Wilson	W. S. Van Dyke	William Powell	
1940	Third Finger, Left Hand	Margot Sherwood Merrick	Robert Z. Leonard	Melvyn Douglas	
1940	Northward, Ho!	Herself			
1941	Love Crazy	Susan Ireland	Jack Conway	William Powell, Jack Carson, Gail Patrick	
1941	Shadow of the Thin Man	Nora Charles	W. S. Van Dyke	William Powell, Donna Reed	
1943	Show Business at War	Herself	Louis De Rochemont		
1944	The Thin Man Goes Home	Nora Charles	Richard Thorpe	William Powell	
1946	So Goes My Love; A Genius in the Family (UK)	Jane	Frank Ryan	Don Ameche	
1946	The Best Years of Our Lives	Milly Stephenson	William Wyler	Fredric March, Dana Andrews, Virginia Mayo, Teresa Wright	
1947	The Bachelor and the Bobby-Soxer; Bachelor Knight (UK)	Margaret	Irving Reis	Cary Grant, Shirley Temple, Rudy Vallee	
1947	Song of the Thin Man	Nora Charles	Edward Buzzell	William Powell, Dean Stockwell	
1947	The Senator Was Indiscreet; Mr. Ashton Was Indiscreet (UK)	Mrs. Ashton (uncredited cameo appearance)	George S. Kaufman	William Powell, Ella Raines	
1948	Mr. Blandings Builds His Dream House	Muriel Blandings	H. C. Potter	Cary Grant, Melvyn Douglas	
1949	The Red Pony	Alice Tiflin	Lewis Milestone	Robert Mitchum	Technicolor
1949	That Dangerous Age; If This Be Sin (US)	Lady Cathy Brooke	Gregory Ratoff	Roger Livesey, Peggy Cummins, Richard Greene	
=== 1950–1980 ===
1950	Cheaper by the Dozen	Mrs. Lillian Gilbreth	Walter Lang	Clifton Webb, Jeanne Crain	Technicolor
1952	Belles on Their Toes	Mrs. Lillian Gilbreth	Henry Levin	Jeanne Crain, Debra Paget, Jeffrey Hunter	Technicolor
1956	The Ambassador's Daughter	Mrs. Cartwright	Norman Krasna	Olivia de Havilland, John Forsythe, Adolphe Menjou, Edward Arnold	CinemaScope; Deluxe color
1958	Lonelyhearts	Florence Shrike	Vincent J. Donehue	Montgomery Clift, Robert Ryan, Dolores Hart	
1960	From the Terrace	Martha Eaton	Mark Robson	Paul Newman, Joanne Woodward	CinemaScope; Deluxe color
1960	Midnight Lace	Beatrice ("Aunt Bea") Vorman	David Miller	Doris Day, Rex Harrison, John Gavin, Roddy McDowall	Eastmancolor
1969	The April Fools	Grace Greenlaw	Stuart Rosenberg	Jack Lemmon, Catherine Deneuve, Charles Boyer	Technicolor
1974	Airport 1975	Mrs. Devaney	Jack Smight	Charlton Heston, Gloria Swanson, Karen Black, George Kennedy	Technicolor
1978	The End	Maureen Lawson	Burt Reynolds	Burt Reynolds, Dom DeLuise, Sally Field	Deluxe color
1980	Just Tell Me What You Want	Stella Liberti	Sidney Lumet	Ali MacGraw, Alan King, Peter Weller	Technicolor

=== Box office ranking ===
- 1936 - 18th (US)
- 1937 - 10th (US)
- 1938 - 7th (US)
- 1939 - 16th (US)
- 1940 - 15th (US)
- 1948 - 9th (UK)

== Television ==
Year	Title	Role	Director	Other Players	Filmed in
=== 1955–1969 ===
1955	General Electric Theater (TV Episode: "It Gives Me Great Pleasure")	Kate Kennedy		Patric Knowles	
1957	General Electric Theater (TV Episode: "Lady of the House")	Maggie Webster		Robert Preston	
1957	General Electric Theater (TV Episode: "Love Came Late")	Allie Evans		Melvyn Douglas	
1957	Schlitz Playhouse of Stars (TV Episode: "No Second Helpingre")			Jill St. John	
1959	Meet Me in St. Louis (TV Special)	Mrs. Smith	George Schaefer	Jane Powell, Walter Pidgeon, Jeanne Crain, Patty Duke, Tab Hunter	
1960	The DuPont Show with June Allyson (TV Episode: "Surprise Party")	Mary Sidney		Gerald Mohr, Mark Goddard	
1960	What's My Line? (Episode: July 31)	Mystery Guest			
1960	I've Got a Secret (Episode: November 30)	Herself			
1967	Family Affair (TV Episode: "A Helping Hand")	Adele	William D. Russell	Brian Keith, John Williams	color
1967	The Virginian (TV Episode: "Lady of the House")	Mrs. Miles	Abner Biberman	Doug McClure, James Drury	color
=== 1970–1991 ===
1970	The 42nd Annual Academy Awards	Herself (Presenter: Best Short Films, Art Direction, and Best Director)	Jack Haley, Jr. Richard Dunlap		color
1971	Death Takes a Holiday (TV movie)	Selena Chapman	Robert Butler	Yvette Mimieux, Monte Markham	Technicolor
1971	Do Not Fold, Spindle or Mutilate (TV movie)	Evelyn Tryon	Ted Post	Helen Hayes, Mildred Natwick, Sylvia Sidney	color
1972	Columbo (TV Episode: "Étude in Black")	Lizzy Fielding	Nicholas Colasanto	Peter Falk, John Cassavetes, Blythe Danner	Technicolor
1972	The Couple Takes a Wife (TV movie)	Mrs. Flanagan (Mother)	Jerry Paris	Bill Bixby, Paula Prentiss	Technicolor
1972	The Movie Game (Episode: February 7)	Herself		Larry Blyden	color
1973	Ironside (TV Episode: "All About Andrea")	Andrea Wollcott		Raymond Burr	color
1974	Indict and Convict (TV movie)	Judge Christine Tayloy	Boris Sagal	George Grizzard, William Shatner	Technicolor
1974	The Elevator (TV movie)	Amanda Kenyon	Jerry Jameson	James Farentino, Roddy McDowell	Technicolor
1974	ABC's Wide World of Entertainment (Episode: "That's Entertainment! 50 Years of MGM")	Herself			color
1976	The American Film Institute Presents a Salute to William Wyler	Herself		William Wyler (honoree)	color
1977	It Happened at Lakewood Manor (TV movie)	Ethel Adams	Robert Scheerer	Suzanne Somers, Robert Foxworth	color
1981	Summer Solstice (TV movie)	Margaret Turner	Ralph Rosenblum	Henry Fonda	color
1981	Henry Fonda and the Making of Summer Solstice	Herself		Henry Fonda	color
1982	Love, Sidney (TV Episode: "Sidney and the Actress")	Vera Lonnigan		Tony Randall	color
1982	Night of 100 Stars	Herself	Clark Jones		color
1988	The Kennedy Center Honors: A Celebration of the Performing Arts	Herself (Honoree)		George Burns	color
1991	The 63rd Annual Academy Awards	Herself (Honorary Award Recipient)	Jeff Margolis	Billy Crystal	color
