= Boris Deutsch =

American painter

Boris Deutsch (1892–1978) was a naturalized American painter.

== Biography ==
Boris Deutsch, a figurative and expressionist painter, born from a Jewish family in Krasnogorka shtetl, Belarus then part of the Russian Empire, was educated at the Bloom Academy of Fine Arts, Riga, and completed postgraduate work in Berlin. With the outbreak of the World War I he was drafted in Russian army with the risk of dying so his mother helped him to desert with false identity papers. He went first to Harbin in China and then in Japan. From Japan he came to United States in 1916 landing in Seattle and then lived and painted in Los Angeles. In that city he joined the group of artists called "The Art Students' League" that included: Stanton Macdonald-Wright, Ben Berlin, John Decker, Ejnar Hansen, John Barrymore, Sadakichi Hartmann and Val Costello. He worked for Paramount Pictures in the special effects department. He also taught advanced painting at Otis Art Institute for about six years. On september 11, 1924 in Los Angeles he married (Rebecca) Riva Segal (Romania, September 14, 1899 - Los Angeles, October 17, 1961) Thanks to the help of Anita Delano and Stanton Macdonald-Wright he could organize his first solo exhibitions and in the following years he became a highly regarded artist also as portraitist and among his subjects, in addition to his beautiful wife, who became his muse, were Charlie Chaplin, Gloria Swanson, Merle Armitage, Henry A. Wallace, Josef von Sternberg, Rexford Tugwell and Sadakichi Hartmann. In 1929 he decorated some interiors of the Floridian Hotel in Miami Beach Florida and during the 1930s he won many prizes, the first in 1930 for a head of Riva in San Diego Museum of Art and received several mural commissions from the Section of Painting and Sculpture, including Hot Springs, New Mexico Post Office, Reedley, California Post Office, and 11 murals in the U.S. Post Office-Los Angeles Terminal Annex, a Spanish Colonial Revival building opened in 1940 next to the completed Union Station. He also was director of a 15-minute experimental and expressionist film Lullaby, starring Michael Visaroff, created in 1929. It relates the story of a young servant, played by Deutsch's wife, Riva, who is abused by her Christian masters until she falls in love with a musician and escapes. Deutsch died in Los Angeles on January 16, 1978.

== Artworks ==
Boris Deutsch was a modernist painter who studied art in Berlin and so was deeply influenced by German expressionism. He uses intense colours and his brushwork is typically free and highly textured with a tendency to the geometrization of forms, however he never forgot his love for Rembrandt, in particular "The Man with the Golden Helmet", and for figurative art which undoubtedly had its apogee in his mural paintings. He sometimes painted also in cubist and surrealist styles. All his works tend to be emotional, full of sentiment and phatos.

== Works ==
- "Three Jews" Watercolor, graphite, and charcoal, Fine Arts Museums of San Francisco
- "Abstraction" Oil on canvas, 1923, San Francisco Museum of Modern Art
- "Self-portrait" 1921, oil on canvas mounted on paperboard, Smithsonian American Art Museum
- "Sleeping Woman" 1925, oil on paperboard, Smithsonian American Art Museum
- "The Tailor" 1927, oil on canvas, Smithsonian American Art Museum
- "Indian Bear Dance (Color Study for Hot Springs, New Mexico) ca. 1940, crayon, watercolor, and colored pencil on paper. Smithsonian American Art Museum
- "Portrait of artist wife" oil on canvas. 1942, San Bernardino County Museum
- "Man with Flute" Oil on canvas 1946, The Magnes Collection of Jewish Art and Life, Berkeley, California
- "Self portrait" Oil on canvas, 1927, The Magnes Collection of Jewish Art and Life, Berkeley, California
- "Female Portrait - Riva" Oil on canvas, 1929, The Magnes Collection of Jewish Art and Life, Berkeley, California
- "Portrait of a Women reading" Oil on canvas, 1934, The Magnes Collection of Jewish Art and Life, Berkeley, California
- "Portrait of Riva" Oil on canvas, 1931, The Magnes Collection of Jewish Art and Life, Berkeley, California
- "Cultural Contributions of North, South and Central America" 1939–1944, eleven tempera on plaster lunettes, U.S. Post Office-Los Angeles Terminal Annex, California. To note self-portrait and portrait of Riva in the lunette "The astronomical research"
- "Indian Bear Dance, Truth or Consequences", 1938, oil on canvas mural, Geronimo Retail Unit, 300 Main Street, New Mexico, Post Office.
- "Grape Pickers", 1941, oil on canvas mural, Reedley, California post office building.
- "Female head", 1930, mixed media,
- "Sleeping woman - Riva -",1925, watercolor,
