= Hardboiled Rose =

1929 film

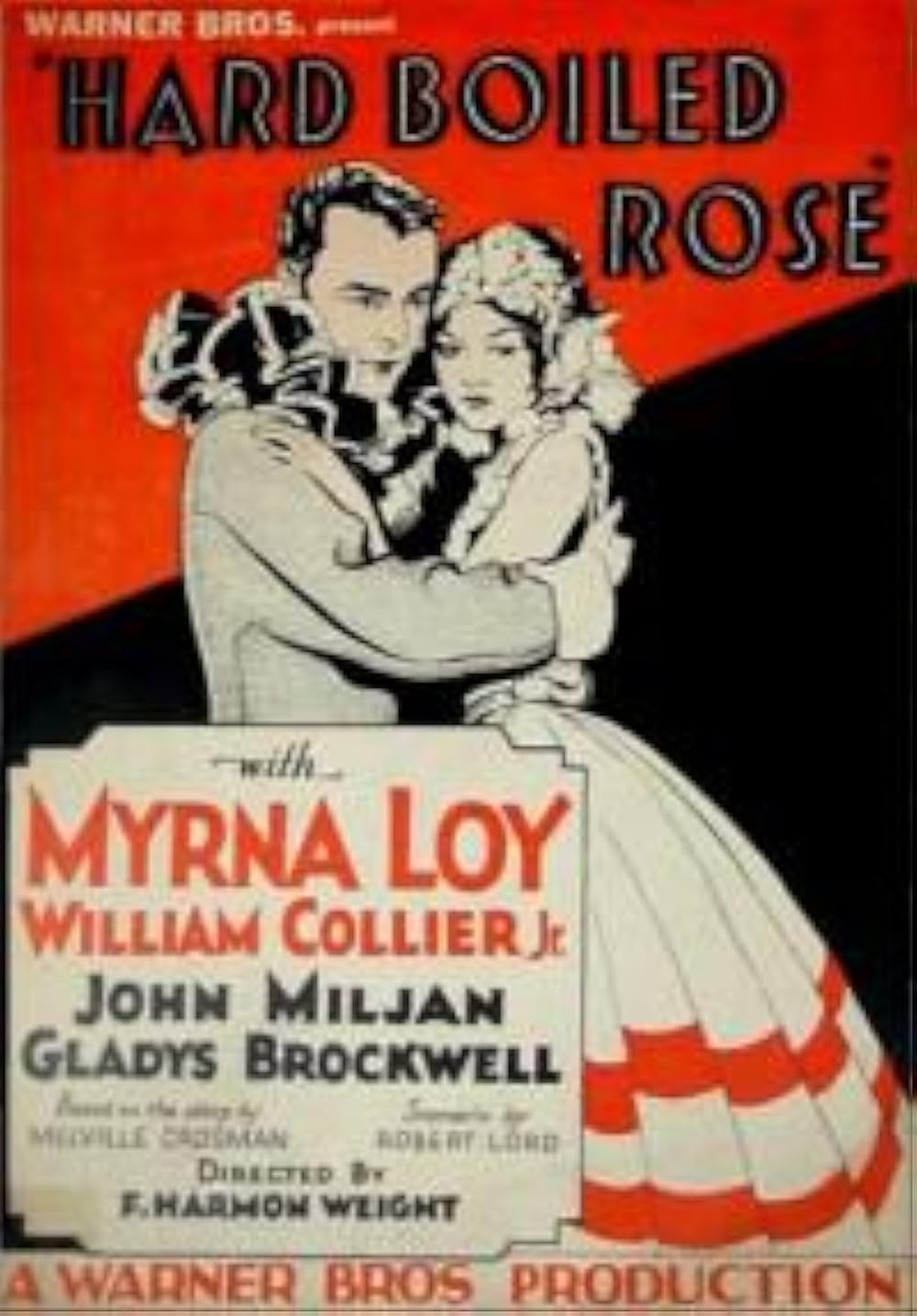
- Theatrical release poster
- Directed by: F. Harmon Weight
- Written by: Darryl F. Zanuck (story); Robert Lord (screenplay); Joseph Jackson (titles)
- Starring: Myrna Loy; William Collier, Jr. John Miljan
- Cinematography: William Rees
- Edited by: William Holmes
- Distributed by: Warner Bros. Pictures, Inc. (as Warner Brothers Production)
- Release date: March 30, 1929
- Running time: 5 reels (silent version); 6 reels (sound version)
- Country: United States
- Languages: Sound (Part-Talkie); English Intertitles

Hardboiled Rose is a 1929 American sound part-talkie romantic drama film directed by F. Harmon Weight and released by Warner Bros. Pictures. In addition to sequences with audible dialogue or talking sequences, the film features a synchronized musical score and sound effects along with English intertitles. The soundtrack was recorded using the Vitaphone sound-on-disc system. The film starred Myrna Loy, William Collier, Jr., and John Miljan.

== Plot ==
In the heart of New Orleans, courtly Jefferson Duhamel lives in the ancestral family home with his ailing mother. His partner in a prominent banking firm, Payton Hale, dismisses whispers that Duhamel—an aristocrat through and through—has been frequenting the notorious gambling house run by the glamorous Julie Malo. Unbeknownst to Hale, Duhamel has been steadily losing at roulette and has racked up gambling debts totaling $200,000, secured by personal notes held by Julie. Duhamel believes her delay in collecting is a sign of affection, unaware she's merely biding time until he's financially ruined. Julie, her son Edward, and her associate Steve Wallace, the real proprietor of the gambling den, are all well aware of Duhamel's impending downfall.

Into this charged atmosphere returns Rose Duhamel, Jefferson's vivacious daughter, home from finishing school. She quickly falls in love with John Trask, her father's loyal private secretary, and accepts his marriage proposal. Jefferson is delighted, while Grandmama Duhamel wistfully remarks that she only wishes John were one of the Trasks of Virginia.

Everything begins to unravel when Julie Malo summons Jefferson to her gambling house. Their affair ends in a bitter quarrel as she demands immediate payment, threatening to expose the notes to Hale. In desperation, Duhamel steals securities from his firm, delivers them to Julie, and returns home where he takes his own life.

Trask and a household servant discover the body. To spare the grandmother, they claim it was heart failure. Trask uncovers the real cause and takes the fall for the theft, swearing the butler to silence. When Payton Hale, Rose, and Mrs. Duhamel blame him, the servant hints at his innocence. Determined to clear Trask's name, Rose visits him in jail and uncovers the truth.

She traces the stolen securities to Julie Malo's gambling establishment. In a daring plan, Rose dons a flaring evening gown and a bold air of sophistication and infiltrates the club. She wins over Edward Malo, who becomes smitten and soon confides, while drunk, that the stolen securities are hidden in the safe until the scandal dies down. Rose pretends to agree to an elopement with him, subtly noting she has no money.

Before Edward can remove the securities for her, Steve Wallace catches him in the act. In the ensuing chaos, Rose seizes the bonds and escapes. Back at the Duhamel residence, she's about to return the securities to the wall safe when Julie bursts in, revolver drawn, demanding them back. In a tense showdown of nerves and willpower, Rose refuses to surrender the bonds—and wins.

To protect the family's reputation, it is announced that the securities were merely mislaid in the safe all along. They're returned to the bank, Trask is exonerated, and love triumphs. Rose and John reunite, their engagement back on track, and the scandal gives way to a happy ending.

== Cast ==
- Myrna Loy as Rose Dunhamel
- William Collier, Jr. as Edward Malo
- John Miljan as Steve Wallace
- Gladys Brockwell as Julie Malo
- Lucy Beaumont as Grandmama Dunhamel
- Ralph Emerson as John Trask
- Edward Martindel as Jefferson Dunhamel
- Otto Hoffman as Apyton Hale
- Floyd Shackelford as Butler

== Production ==
This was Loy's second starring role in a movie, after Turn Back the Hours (1928). Hardboiled Rose would become Myrna Loy's last part-talkie. After this movie Myrna Loy would make all-talking movies, with some filmed in Technicolor. Loy's early talkies in Technicolor were The Desert Song (1929, Warner Brothers' first movie released in color), The Show of Shows (1929) and Under a Texas Moon (1930, the second all color-all talking movie to be filmed outdoors).

In 1933, Loy's Warners contract ended and she signed with Metro-Goldwyn-Mayer. In 1934, Myrna Loy made two movies with MGM that would make her a big star for the next 20 years, Manhattan Melodrama and The Thin Man.

== Sound ==
According to TV Guide.com's review of Hardboiled Rose, the talking sequences were added to the movie later in production. All studios were converting to sound, so major studio releases had to be at least a part-talkie.

== Film preservation ==
The film elements for Hardboiled Rose still survive, but the soundtrack, which was recorded on Vitaphone discs, is lost except for the fourth reel disc.

== See also ==
- List of Warner Bros. films
- Myrna Loy filmography
- Silent movies
- Vitaphone
- List of early sound feature films (1926–1929)
- List of early Warner Bros. sound and talking features
