= Married in Hollywood =

1929 film

Married In Hollywood
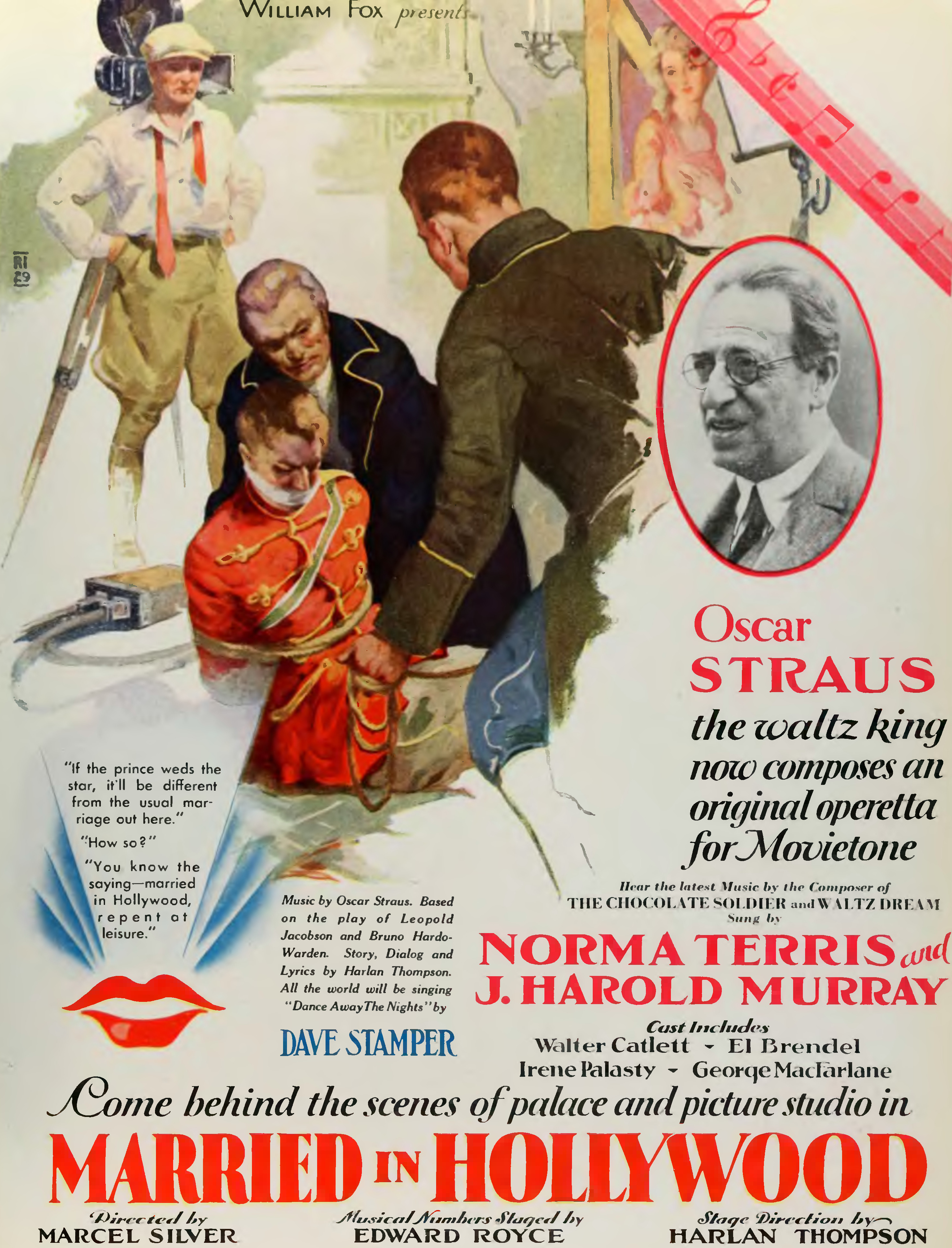
- Directed by: Marcel Silver
- Written by: Oscar Straus (operettas Hochzeit in Hollywood and Ein Walzertraum); Leopold Jacobson (operettas Hochzeit in Hollywood and Ein Walzertraum); Bruno Hardt-Warden (operetta Hochzeit in Hollywood); Felix Dörmann (operetta Ein Walzertraum)
- Screenplay by: Harlan Thompson
- Starring: J. Harold Murray; Norma Terris; Walter Catlett; Tom Patricola
- Cinematography: Charles Van Enger; Sol Halperin
- Edited by: Dorothy Spencer
- Music by: Arthur Kay (music); Oscar Straus (score)
- Production company: Fox Film Corporation
- Distributed by: Fox Film Corporation
- Release date: September 1929 (US)
- Running time: 110 minutes
- Country: United States
- Language: English

Married in Hollywood is a 1929 American All-Talking pre-Code musical film directed by Marcel Silver. This lavishly produced film featured color sequences in the Multicolor process.

The film is based on two Oscar Straus operettas.

== Plot ==
A showgirl, part of a troupe, tours Europe where she falls in love with a Balkan prince. The prince's parents disapprove and attempt to put a stop to the romance. A revolution occurs and the prince and the showgirl elope to Hollywood.

== Cast ==
- J. Harold Murray as Prince Nicholai
- Norma Terris as Mary Lou Hopkins / Mitzi Hofman
- Walter Catlett as Joe Glitner
- Irene Palasty as Annushka
- Lennox Pawle as King Alexander
- Tom Patricola as Mahai
- Mother Esther MerrillEvelyn Hall as Queen Louise
- John Garrick as Stage Prince
- Douglas Gilmore as Adjutant Octvian
- Gloria Grey as Charlotte
- Jack Stambaugh as Captain Jacobi
- Bert Sprotte as Herr von Herzen
- Leila Karnelly as Frau von Herzen
- Paul Ralli as Namari
- Donald Gallaher as Movie Director
- Carey Harrison as Detective
- Roy Seegar as Detective

== Soundtrack ==
- Dance Away the Night (not to be confused with the similarly titled song from the original London production of Show Boat)

Music by Dave Stamper
Lyrics by Harlan Thompson

- Peasant Love Song

Music by Dave Stamper
Lyrics by Harlan Thompson

- Once Upon A Time

Music by Dave Stamper
Lyrics by Harlan Thompson

- A Man, A Maid

Music by Oscar Straus
Lyrics by Harlan Thompson

- Deep In Love

Music by Oscar Straus
Lyrics by Harlan Thompson

- Bridal Chorus

Music by Arthur Kay
Lyrics by Harlan Thompson

- National Anthem

Music by Arthur Kay
Lyrics by Harlan Thompson

== Preservation ==
The only footage currently known to survive of the film is the final reel, which was filmed in Multicolor, held by the UCLA Film and Television Archive.

== See also ==
- List of incomplete or partially lost films
- List of early sound feature films (1926–1929)
- List of early color feature films
