= Desert Vengeance =

1931 film

- Directed by: Louis King
- Written by: Stuart Anthony
- Produced by: Harry Cohn; Sol Lesser
- Starring: Buck Jones; Barbara Bedford; Douglas Gilmore
- Cinematography: Ted D. McCord
- Edited by: Ray Snyderk
- Production company: Columbia Pictures
- Distributed by: Columbia Pictures
- Release date: January 25, 1931
- Running time: 65 minutes
- Country: United States
- Language: English

Desert Vengeance is a 1931 American pre-Code western film directed by Louis King and starring Buck Jones, Barbara Bedford and Douglas Gilmore. It was produced and distributed by Columbia Pictures.

== Cast ==
- Buck Jones as Jim Cardew (as Charles 'Buck' Jones)
- Barbara Bedford as Anne Dixon
- Douglas Gilmore as Hugh Dixon
- Ed Brady as Beaver
- Albert J. Smith as McBride (as Al Smith)
- Bob Fleming as Winnipeg - McBride Rider
- Slim Whitaker as Whiskey - Cardew Rider
- Chuck Baldra as Chuck - Cardew Rider
- Barney Beasley as Cardew Rider
- Charles Brinley as Poker Game Spectator
- Buck Connors as The Parson
- Joseph W. Girard as Ship's Captain
- Gilbert Holmes as Alabam - Cardew Rider
- Russell Hopton as Inspector
- Arthur Millett as Train Conductor
- Art Mix as McBride Rider
- Bill Nestell as Cardew Rider
- Bill Patton as Bill - McBride Rider
- Evelyn Selbie as Indian Woman
- Blue Washington as Train Porter

== Bibliography ==
- Fetrow, Alan G. . Sound films, 1927-1939: a United States Filmography. McFarland, 1992.
- Pitts, Michael R. Western Movies: A Guide to 5,105 Feature Films. McFarland, 2012.
