= U.S. Post Office-Los Angeles Terminal Annex =

- United States Post Office; Los Angeles Terminal Annex
- U.S. National Register of Historic Places
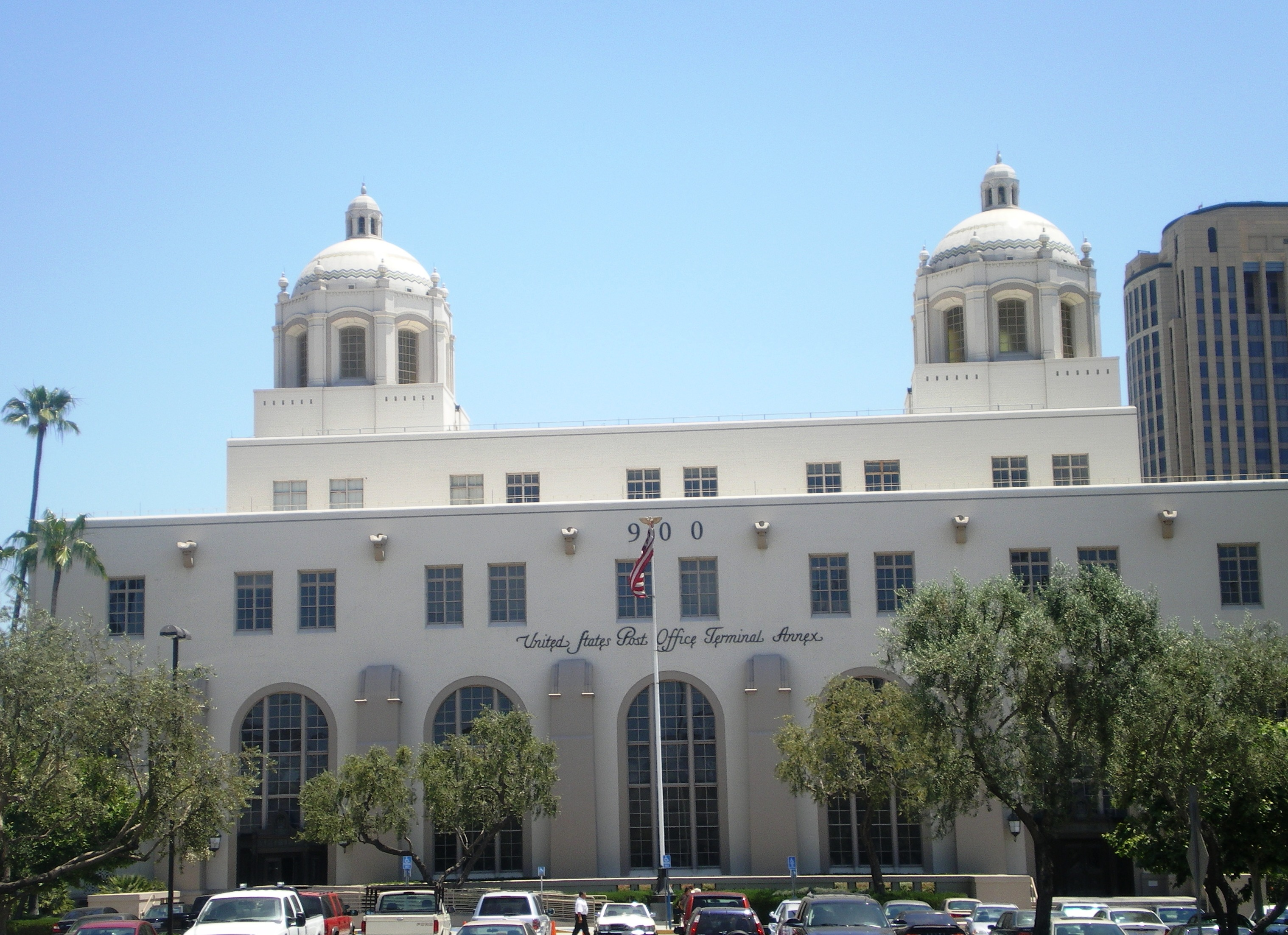
- Terminal Annex in 2008

- Location within California
- Location: 900 N. Alameda St., Los Angeles, California
- Coordinates: 34°3′36″N 118°14′7″W
- Area: 3.8 acres (1.5 ha)
- Built: 1940 (completed)
- Architect: Gilbert Stanley Underwood
- Architectural style: Mission Revival-Spanish Colonial Revival
- MPS: US Post Office in California 1900-1941 TR
- NRHP reference No.: 85000131
- Added to NRHP: January 11, 1985

The United States Post Office – Los Angeles Terminal Annex, also known simply as Terminal Annex, located at 900 North Alameda Street in Los Angeles, California, was the central mail processing facility for Los Angeles from 1940 to 1989.

Across Cesar Chavez Avenue from Union Station, the Mission Revival and Spanish Colonial Revival building of Terminal Annex, which was designed by Gilbert Stanley Underwood, was added to the National Register of Historic Places in 1985.

== Construction and opening ==
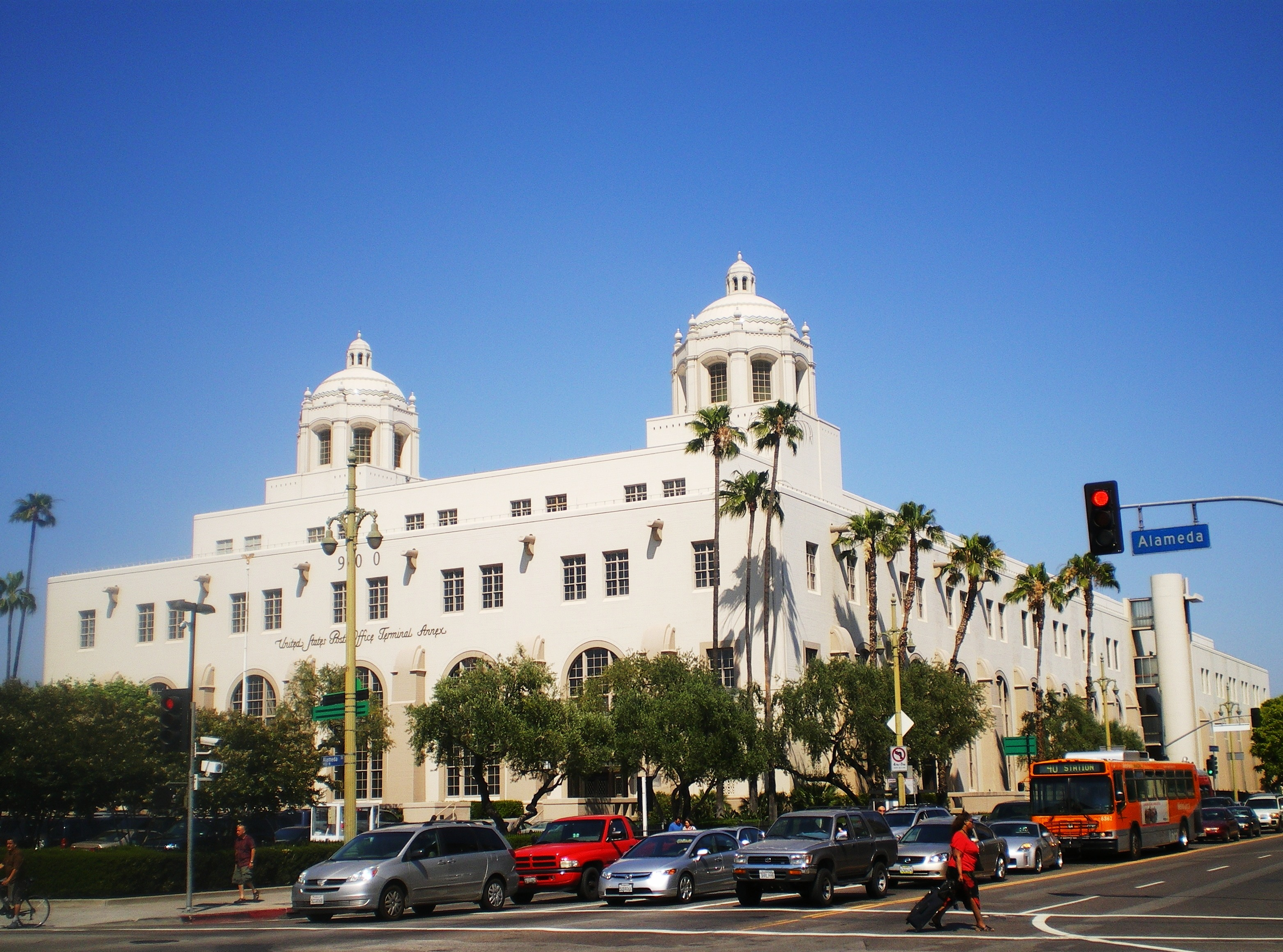
Terminal Annex in 2008

Designed by Gilbert Stanley Underwood, the Terminal Annex was built by the Sarver & Zoss contracting firm from 1939 to 1940. The building was built for the purpose of processing all incoming and outgoing mail in Los Angeles. Though its purpose was principally utilitarian, Underwood sought to keep the building's design in keeping with the city's Union Station, which opened across the street in May 1939. The original building was a three-story structure with two towers and 400,000 square feet (37,000 m^{2}) of floor space.

The $3 million postal annex opened in May 1940 with 1,632 postal clerks, carriers and laborers responsible for the processing of 2 million pieces of mail per day. The facility, which was kept open 24 hours a day, was equipped with the latest facilities for rapid handling of mail, including conveyors, chutes, weighing machines, cancelling machines, and sorting and facing tables. At the time of its opening, it was considered "the most modern and efficient" post office in the nation. At the formal dedication ceremony in June 1940, the postmaster called the annex a symbol of the achievements of democracy, opening at a time when the monuments of Europe were "being ground in the dust."

== Murals ==
The lobby includes twelve Section of Painting and Sculpture murals painted by Boris Deutsch from 1941 to 1944.

== 1950s expansion ==
Only ten years after its opening, the demands of the city's mail had already outgrown the facility. Accordingly, the Post Office announced plans in 1950 for a $12 million expansion, including an adjoining five-story parcel post building and other structures as well.

== 1980s South Los Angeles facility ==
By the 1980s, operations had outgrown even the expanded facilities at the Terminal Annex. The facility's volume had grown by the mid-1980s to 14 million pieces of mail per day, and the annex was plagued by inadequate space, overcrowding and inadequate work areas. Accordingly, the Postal Service Board of Governors in 1984 approved the construction of a new $151 million general post office in South Los Angeles. Almost 50 years after Terminal Annex became the city's main mail-processing facility, the new processing facility in South Central opened in 1989.

The Postal Service moved out of the building in 1995.

== Filming location ==
The vacant building was used as a film location for the motion picture Dear God in 1995 and for the CBS television series EZ Streets in 1996. Producers used the lobby, decorated with WPA murals, to represent Los Angeles City Hall.

For the 1998 movie City of Angels, it was used as a hospital set, complete with an emergency room entrance.

== Data center ==
As of 2015, most of the building has been leased to CoreSite, which uses it as their LA2 data center. Like all data centers, it is a secure facility and not open to the public.

The lobby level houses a postal counter with stamp sales and provides mail pick-up for customers who rent mail boxes.

== Scandals and tragedies ==
During nearly 50 years as the city's central postal processing facility, the Terminal Annex suffered a number of scandals and tragedies, including the following:

- In 1954, two veteran postal employees were charged with being the ringleaders of two large bookmaking operations operating out of the Terminal Annex. Investigators alleged that 10-15 other employees were involved in the operations.
- In 1970, a postal supervisor was shot and killed at the Terminal Annex by a disgruntled postal clerk. After the supervisor ordered the clerk to leave work for intoxication, the clerk waited outside the annex and shot the supervisor in the back three times as the supervisor ran toward the security desk, calling for help.
- In 1978, a pipe bomb, wrapped in a package, exploded in a sorting room at the Terminal Annex, slightly injuring six postal workers.
- In 1985, a malfunctioning voltage line in the basement of the Terminal Annex caused an 8 1/2-hour power blackout that halted operations at the facility. The power outage resulted in a one-day delay in the delivery of 1.5 million pieces of mail and was front-page news in the Los Angeles Times.
- In 1986, 12 postal workers employed at the Terminal Annex were charged as alleged pushers of both powder and rock cocaine.

== Historic designation ==
The Terminal Annex building was listed on the National Register of Historic Places in 1985 based on its architectural style.

== See also ==
- List of Registered Historic Places in Los Angeles
- List of United States post offices
