= Under Suspicion (1930 film) =

1930 film by A. F. Erickson

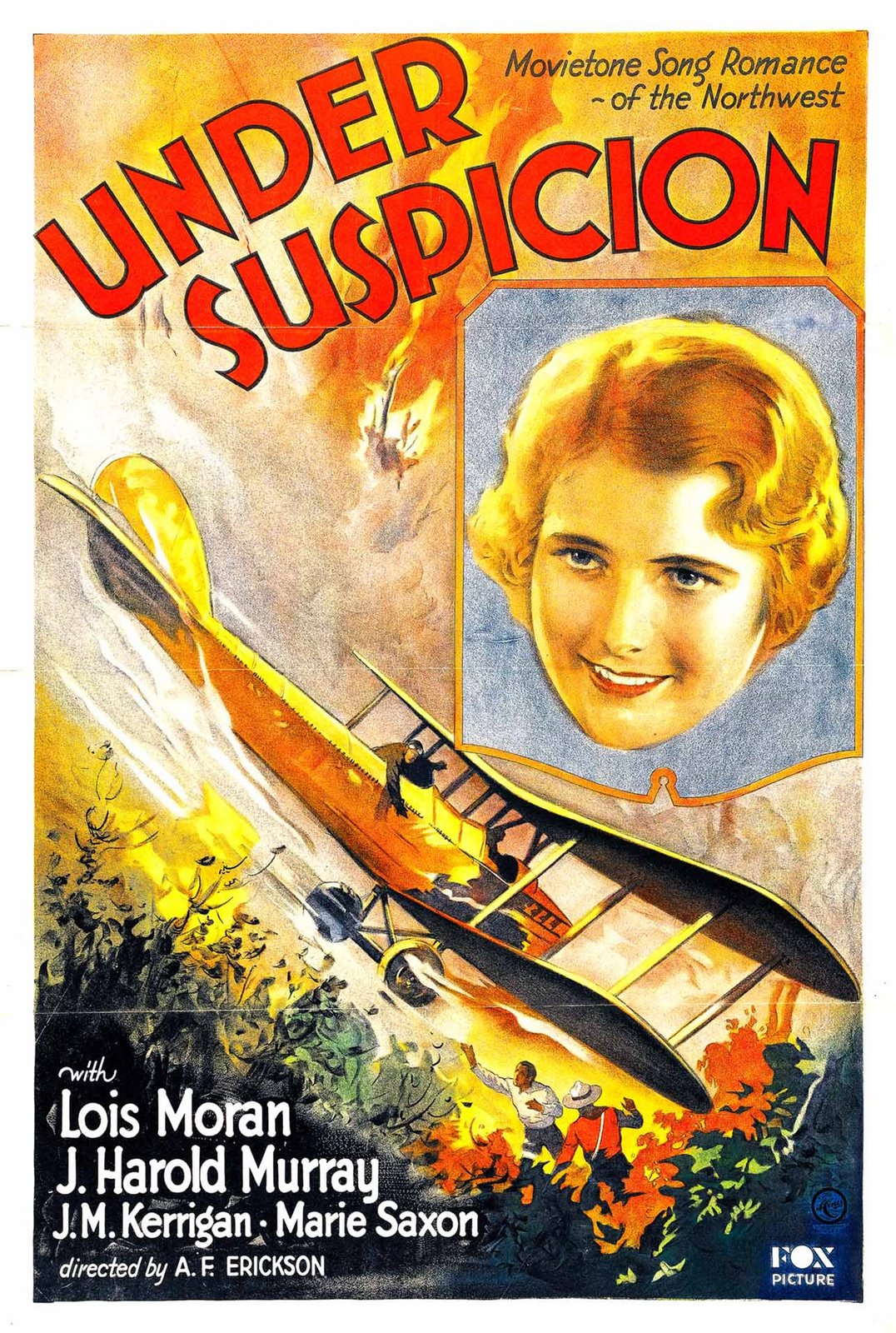
- Film poster
- Directed by: A. F. Ericsson
- Written by: Tom Barry
- Produced by: William Fox; James K. McGuinness
- Starring: J. Harold Murray; Lois Moran
- Cinematography: George Schneiderman; Arthur L. Todd
- Edited by: J. Edwin Robbins
- Music by: James F. Hanley; Joseph McCarthy
- Distributed by: Fox Film Corporation
- Release date: December 30, 1930
- Running time: 65 minutes
- Country: United States
- Language: English

Under Suspicion is a 1930 American pre-Code musical drama film directed by A. F. Erickson and starring J. Harold Murray and Lois Moran. It was produced and distributed by the Fox Film Corporation.

== Cast ==
- J. Harold Murray as John Smith, aka Sir Robert Macklin
- Lois Moran as Alice Freil
- J. M. Kerrigan as Doyle
- Marie Saxon as Suzanne
- Lumsden Hare as Freil
- George Brent as Inspector Turner
- Erwin Connelly as Darby
- Rhoda Cross as Marie
- Vera Gerald as Ellen
- Herbert Bunston as Major Manners
