= The Big Party =

1930 film

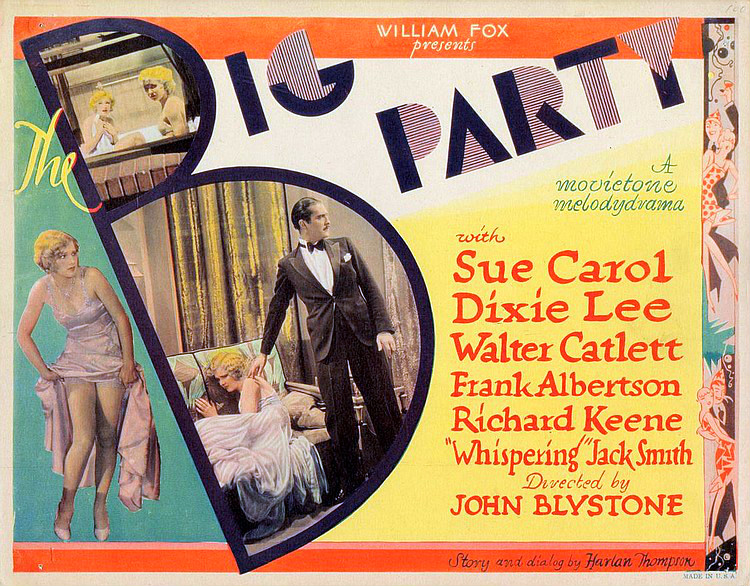
- Lobby card
- Directed by: John G. Blystone
- Screenplay by: Harlan Thompson
- Story by: Harlan Thompson
- Produced by: John G. Blystone
- Starring: Sue Carol; Dixie Lee; Walter Catlett; Frank Albertson; Richard Keene; Douglas Gilmore
- Cinematography: George Schneiderman
- Edited by: J. Edwin Robbins
- Production company: Fox Film Corporation
- Distributed by: Fox Film Corporation
- Release date: February 23, 1930
- Running time: 70 minutes
- Country: United States
- Language: English

The Big Party is a 1930 American pre-Code comedy film directed by John G. Blystone and written by Harlan Thompson. The film stars Sue Carol, Dixie Lee, Walter Catlett, Frank Albertson, Richard Keene, and Douglas Gilmore. The film was released on February 23, 1930, by Fox Film Corporation. It is a lost film.

== Cast ==
- Sue Carol as Flo Jenkins
- Dixie Lee as Kitty Collins
- Walter Catlett as Mr. Goldfarb
- Frank Albertson as Jack Hunter
- Richard Keene as Eddie Perkins
- Douglas Gilmore as Allen Weatherby
- Ilka Chase
- Elizabeth Patterson as Mrs. Goldfarb
- Dorothy Brown as Virginia Gates (uncredited)
- Charles Judels as Dupuy (uncredited)
- Whispering Jack Smith as Billy Greer (uncredited)

== Reception ==
The Film Daily reviewed the film in April 1930 calling it a "Can't Miss" and predicted excellent box office traffic. The film also received a favorable review from the National Board of Review in March 1930. When reviewing the film in April 1930, Photoplay considered Dixie Lee's performance to be one of the best in film for 1930.

== See also ==
- 1937 Fox vault fire
