= Lullaby (1929 film) =

1929 film by Boris Deutsch

Lullaby is a 1929 American silent drama film directed by Boris Deutsch and starring Michael Visaroff, and Riva Segal. In Lullaby there is not only a deeply realistic plot that is investigated by the director with a skilled use of light and close-up but also a sort of dream plot that lives in the interiority of the female protagonist represented through faces of demons tormenting her sleep and cubist alteration of the cityscape realized using Deutsch's paintings. In the development of the film the two planes, the real one and the dream one, merge each other and the reality for the female protagonist is one that embraces both sphere of matter and spirit. A work that ahead of its times. Only in 40s, after 14 years, Maya Deren and Alexander Hammid will make similar films. Boris Deutsch declared that "is desire was to get at the abstract reality, the realm of mental imagery and imagination, without losing of the world of reality"

== Synopsis ==
The story of a young servant girl cradling a baby at a drunken feast in the house of Russian Christians who is abused by her brutish patriarch when she fails in her purpose. But she earns the sympathy of a young musician and the patriarch in jealousy beats her. Eventually she falls in love with the musician and escapes. In the last scene we can see the couple happy together. It was only a nightmare.

== Cast ==
- Michael Visaroff as the patriarch
- Riva Segal as the young servant
- Unknown actors of russian origins as other protagonists

== Production ==
The movie was filmed in the United States and its costs, about $500 in borrowed money, were sustained by Boris Deutsch who was also producer, screenwriter, photography director and author of all special effects. The female protagonist of the film, Riva Segal, wife of the director, in her first and only appearance on the big screen, demonstrates, in addition to her beauty, all her skill as actress. As in his paintings also in this work the influence of German expressionism is very evident. It is sufficient to remember works as "The Cabinet of Dr. Caligari" by Robert Wiene. And also for this reason Lullaby can be considered a unique work in the American cinema production of the 1920s
