= Paris (1926 film) =

1926 film

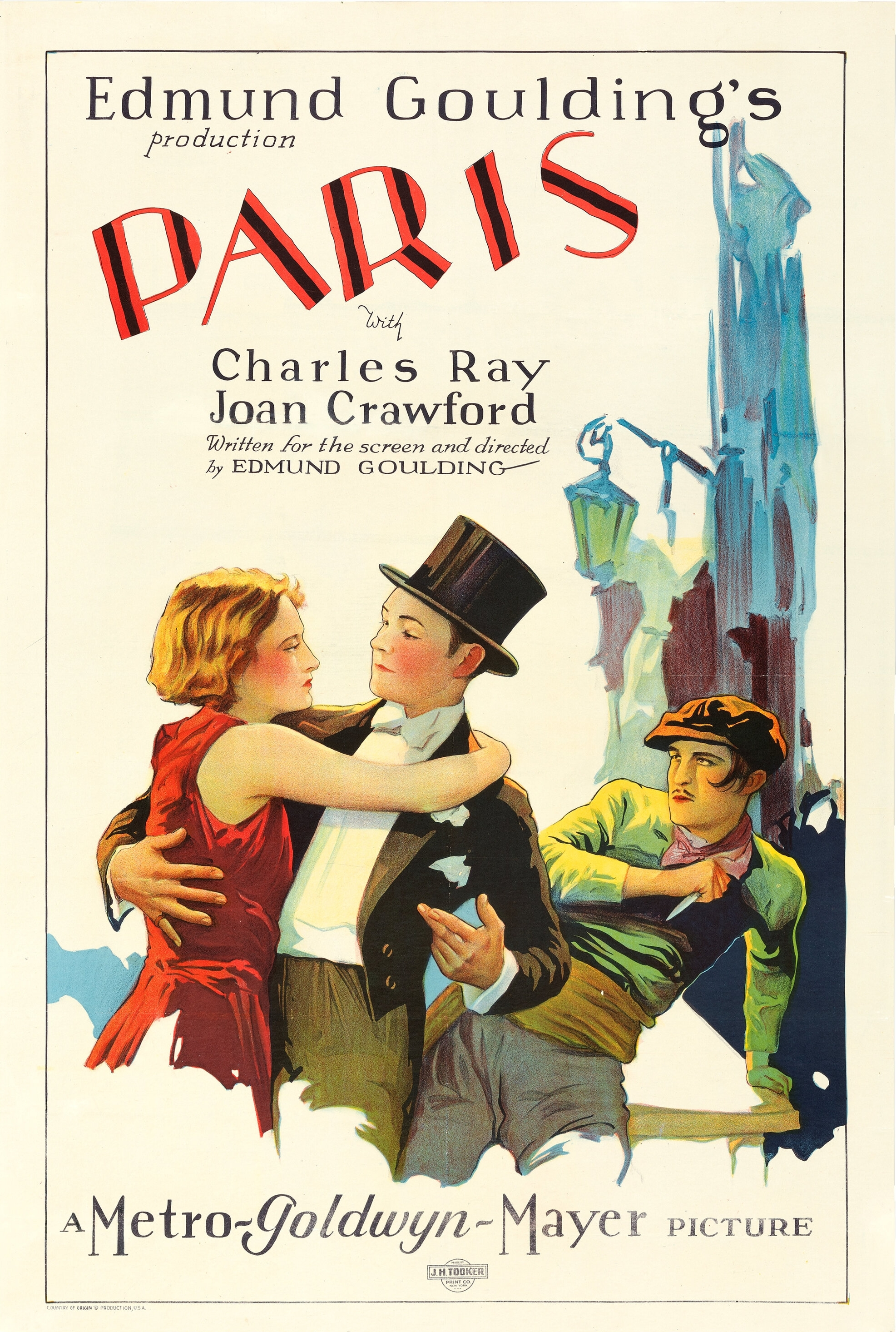
- One Sheet poster
- Directed by: Edmund Goulding
- Written by: Joe Farnham (titles)
- Story by: Edmund Goulding
- Starring: Charles Ray; Joan Crawford; Douglas Gilmore; Michael Visaroff
- Cinematography: John Arnold
- Edited by: Arthur Johns
- Distributed by: Metro-Goldwyn-Mayer
- Release date: May 24, 1926
- Running time: 67 minutes
- Country: United States
- Language: Silent (English intertitles)

Paris is a 1926 American silent romantic drama film written and directed by Edmund Goulding. The film stars Charles Ray, Douglas Gilmore, and Joan Crawford.

== Plot ==
A young American millionaire named Jerry is vacationing in Paris and visits an Apache den, the Birdcage Cafe, where he meets "The Girl". Trouble ensues when "The Cat" injures Jerry in a jealous rage. "The Girl" nurses Jerry back to health while "The Cat" plots to murder "The Girl".

== Cast ==
- Charles Ray as Jerry
- Joan Crawford as The Girl
- Douglas Gilmore as The Cat
- Michael Visaroff as Rocco
- Rose Dione as Marcelle
- Jean Galeron as Pianist
- Sidney Bracey as Minor role (uncredited)
- Louis Mercier as Gigolo (uncredited)
- Philip Sleeman as Minor role (uncredited)
- Pat Somerset as Minor role (uncredited)
