= Women Everywhere =

1930 film directed by Alexander Korda

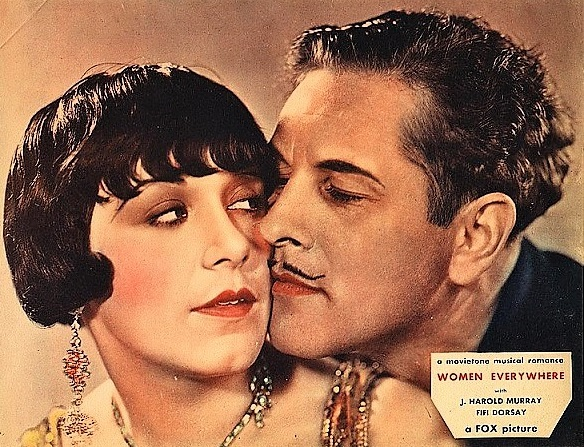
- Lobby card
- Directed by: Alexander Korda
- Written by: George Grossmith Jr. Lajos Bíró; Harlan Thompson; Zoltan Korda
- Produced by: Ned Marin
- Starring: J. Harold Murray; Fifi D'Orsay; George Grossmith Jr. Clyde Cook
- Cinematography: Ernest Palmer
- Edited by: Harold D. Schuster
- Music by: Peter Brunelli; George Lipschultz
- Production company: Fox Film Corporation
- Distributed by: Fox Film Corporation
- Release date: June 1, 1930
- Running time: 82 minutes
- Country: United States
- Language: English

Women Everywhere is a 1930 American Pre-Code musical adventure film directed by Alexander Korda and starring J. Harold Murray, Fifi D'Orsay, and George Grossmith Jr. It is set amongst the French Foreign Legion in North Africa.

The film's songs include: "Women Everywhere", "Beware of Love", "One Day", "Good Time Fifi", "Bon Jour", "Marching Song" (William Kernell), "All in the Family" (Kernell, George Grossmith), and "Smile, Legionnaire" (Kernell, Charles Wakefield Cadman).

== Cast ==
- J. Harold Murray as Charles Jackson
- Fifi D'Orsay as Lili La Fleur
- George Grossmith Jr. as Aristide Brown
- Clyde Cook as Sam Jones
- Ralph Kellard as Michael Kopulos
- Rose Dione as Zephyrine
- Walter McGrail as Lieutenant of Legionnaires
- Harry Cording as Legionnaire in Cafe
- Hans Fuerberg as German Legionnaire
- Bob Kortman as Swedish Legionnaire
- Louis Mercier as Waiter
- Hector Sarno as Italian Legionnaire
- Harry Semels as Legionnaire Officer

== Bibliography ==
- Kulik, Karol. Alexander Korda: The Man Who Could Work Miracles. Virgin Books, 1990.
