= J. Harold Murray =

American actor (1891–1940)

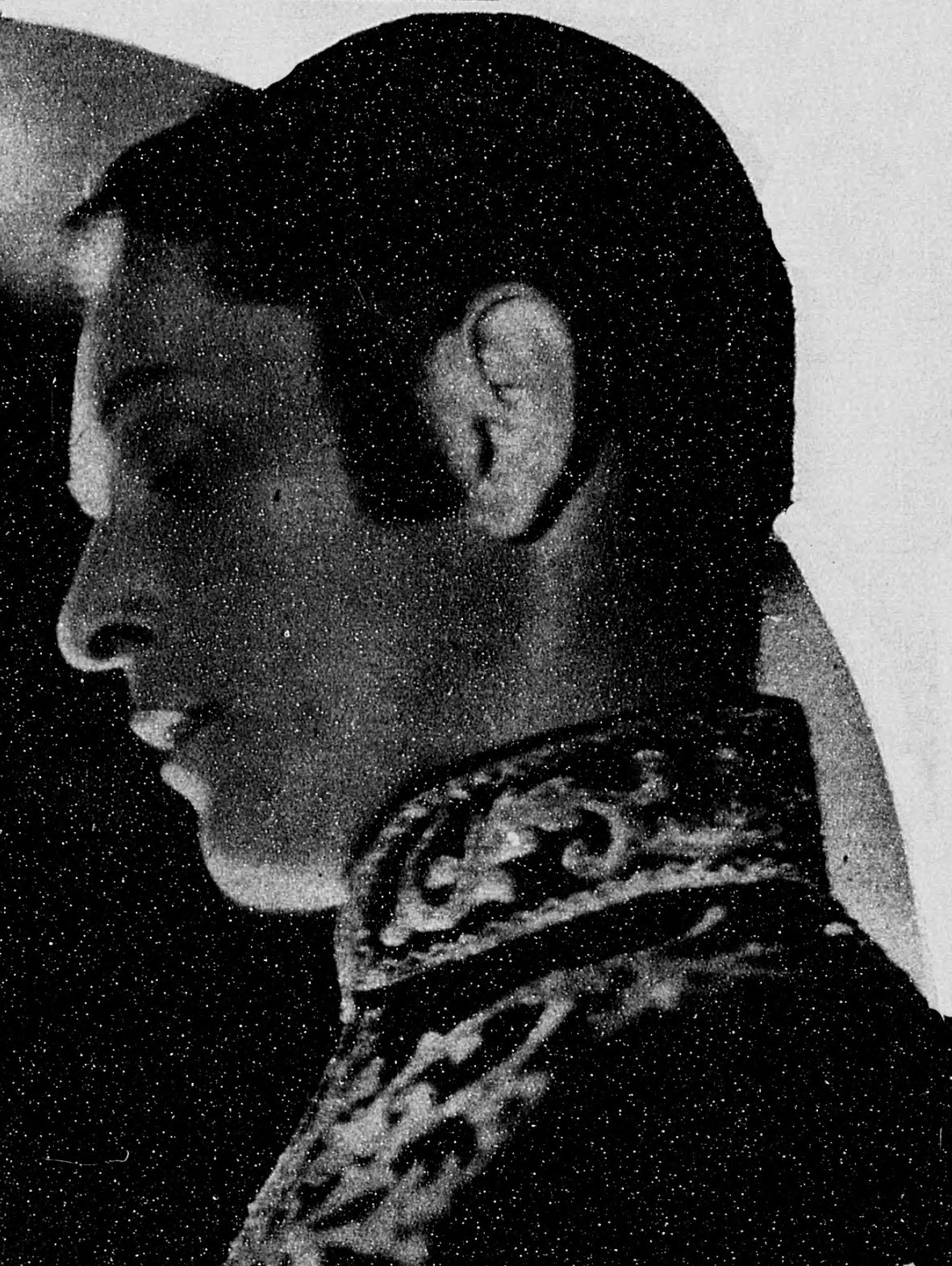
- J. Harold Murray newspaper photo published for his performance in Springtime of Youth, 1922
- Born: Harry Rulten; February 17, 1891; South Berwick, Maine, U.S.
- Died: December 11, 1940 (aged 49); U.S.
- Occupation: Actor
- Spouse: Dolly Hackett
- Children: 1 , William Joseph Rulten Murray

J. Harold Murray (born Harry Rulten, February 17, 1891 – December 11, 1940) was an American baritone singer and actor. For more than a decade, during the Roaring Twenties and the Depression Thirties, he contributed to the development of musical theater by bridging vaudeville, operetta and the modern American musical. The most popular American songs he introduced on Broadway included "Autumn in New York" (1934, Thumbs Up!, words and music by Vernon Duke); "Let's Have Another Cup of Coffee" and "Soft Lights and Sweet Music" (1932, Face the Music, Moss Hart and Irving Berlin); "Rio Rita", "The Kinkajou" and "The Rangers Song" (1927, Rio Rita, Harry Tierney and Joseph McCarthy); and "Mandalay" (1921, The Whirl of New York, Gustave Kerker, Hugh Morton and Edgar Smith).

== Early years ==
Born in South Berwick, Maine, on February 17, 1891, "Hal" Murray served in the Merchant Marine during World War I. As a boy, he studied voice in Boston and sang in theaters and in churches. He moved to New York and worked for a music publishing company for two years.

== Career ==
Murray began performing in vaudeville in 1918 and continued there for two years. He made his debut on the musical theatre stage as J. Harold Murray in out-of-town productions of Arthur Hammerstein's Always You and Frank Tinney's Sometime, both in 1920.

He debuted on Broadway at the age of 30 in J.J. Shubert's The Passing Show of 1921. During the rest of the decade, he starred in 10 musicals, and separately co-starred with Eddie Cantor (Make It Snappy, 1922), Fred Allen (Vogues of 1924) and Joe E. Brown (Captain Jinks, 1925). Other shows were The Midnight Rounders of 1921, The Whirl of New York (1921), Springtime of Youth (1922), Caroline (1923), China Rose (1925) with Olga Steck, and Castles in the Air (1926) with Vivienne Segal. In February 1927, he starred in Rio Rita, a Flo Ziegfeld production. It was so successful after it opened the Ziegfeld Theatre that the musical Show Boat, which had been scheduled to open in April, was delayed until the end of the year.

In Hollywood from 1929 to 1930 in the pre-Code years, Murray appeared in the William Fox Studio musicals Cameo Kirby with Norma Terris, Happy Days, Married In Hollywood with Norma Terris, Women Everywhere (1930) with Fifi D'Orsay, and Under Suspicion.

Returning to New York City, Murray starred in the Moss Hart-Irving Berlin musical Face the Music, Oscar Hammerstein II's East Wind, Thumbs Up, and Venus in Silk. The last was a Laurence Schwab operetta that closed out-of-town (Pittsburgh and Washington, D.C.) before reaching Broadway.

Murray retired from the Broadway stage in 1935. He sang on a Hartford, Connecticut radio show weekly for three years. He also was active in business, and summer stock (The Only Girl, 1938; Knickerbocker Holiday, 1939, at The Player's Theatre, Clinton, Connecticut). He performed in several musical film shorts for Universal Pictures (Nite in a Night Club, 1934; The Singing Bandit, 1937; Somewhere in Paris, 1938; Wild and Bully, 1939), RKO (Phony Boy, 1937; Under a Gypsy Moon, 1938) and Vitaphone (Who Was That Girl, 1934; The Flame Song, 1934).

Modern theater musicals emerged from vaudeville and operettas, and J. Harold Murray played an important role in their early development. His acting and strong baritone performances of songs such as "Rio Rita", "The Ranger's Song", "Let's Have Another Cup of Coffee", "Soft Lights and Sweet Music", and "New York in Autumn" were notable then. His introducing them on the Broadway stage contributed to their withstanding the test of time into the 21st century.

== Later years ==
After Murray left show business, he became part owner of New England Brewery in Hartford, Connecticut, and commuted daily from his 200-acre farm to work at the brewery. He was defeated in a 1938 election when he ran for a seat in the Connecticut State Senate.

== Personal life and death ==
Murray was married to the former Dolly Hackett. He had one son, William Joseph Rulten Murray, from a previous marriage.

J. Harold Murray developed nephritis in the spring of 1940. He died of the disease on December 11 at the age of 49.

== Selected filmography ==
- Married in Hollywood (1929)
- Women Everywhere (1930)
- Under Suspicion (1930)
- Cameo Kirby (1930)
