= Douglas Gilmore =

American actor (1903–1950)

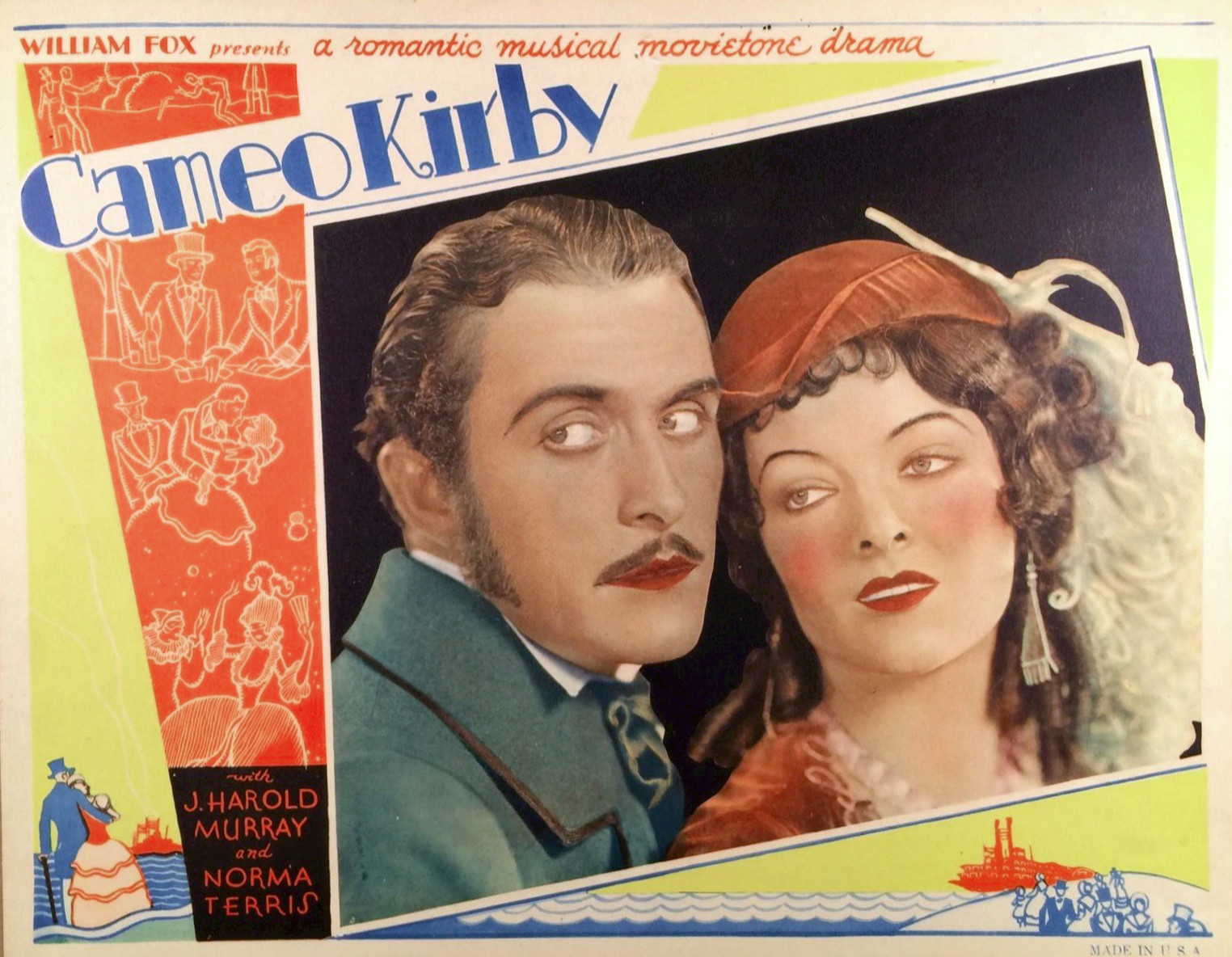
- Lobby card for Cameo Kirby (1930) with Douglas Gilmore and Myrna Loy
- Born: Harris Augustin Gilmore; June 25, 1903; Boston, Massachusetts
- Died: July 26, 1950 (aged 47); New York City, New York
- Resting place: Woodlawn Cemetery, Bronx, New York (Bronx County)
- Occupation: Actor
- Years active: 1925–1943
- Spouse: Ruth Mix (m. 1930; ann. 1932)

Douglas Gilmore (June 25, 1903 – July 26, 1950) was an American actor. He appeared in numerous films and theater productions.

The University of Washington has a photograph of him from 1927.

== Filmography ==
- His Buddy's Wife (1925), his film debut
- Sally, Irene and Mary (1925)
- Dance Madness (1926)
- Paris (1926)
- Love's Blindness (1926)
- The Taxi Dancer (1927)
- A Kiss in a Taxi (1927)
- Rough House Rosie (1927)
- Object: Alimony (1928)
- The Spirit of Youth (1929)
- The One Woman Idea (1929)
- Pleasure Crazed (1929)
- Married in Hollywood (1929)
- A Song of Kentucky (1929)
- Cameo Kirby (1930)
- The Big Party (1930)
- Hell's Angels (1930)
- The Naughty Flirt (1930)
- Desert Vengeance (1931)
- Unfaithful (1931)
- The Girl Habit (1931)
- The Crane Poison Case (1932) (short)
