= The Midnight Taxi =

1928 film

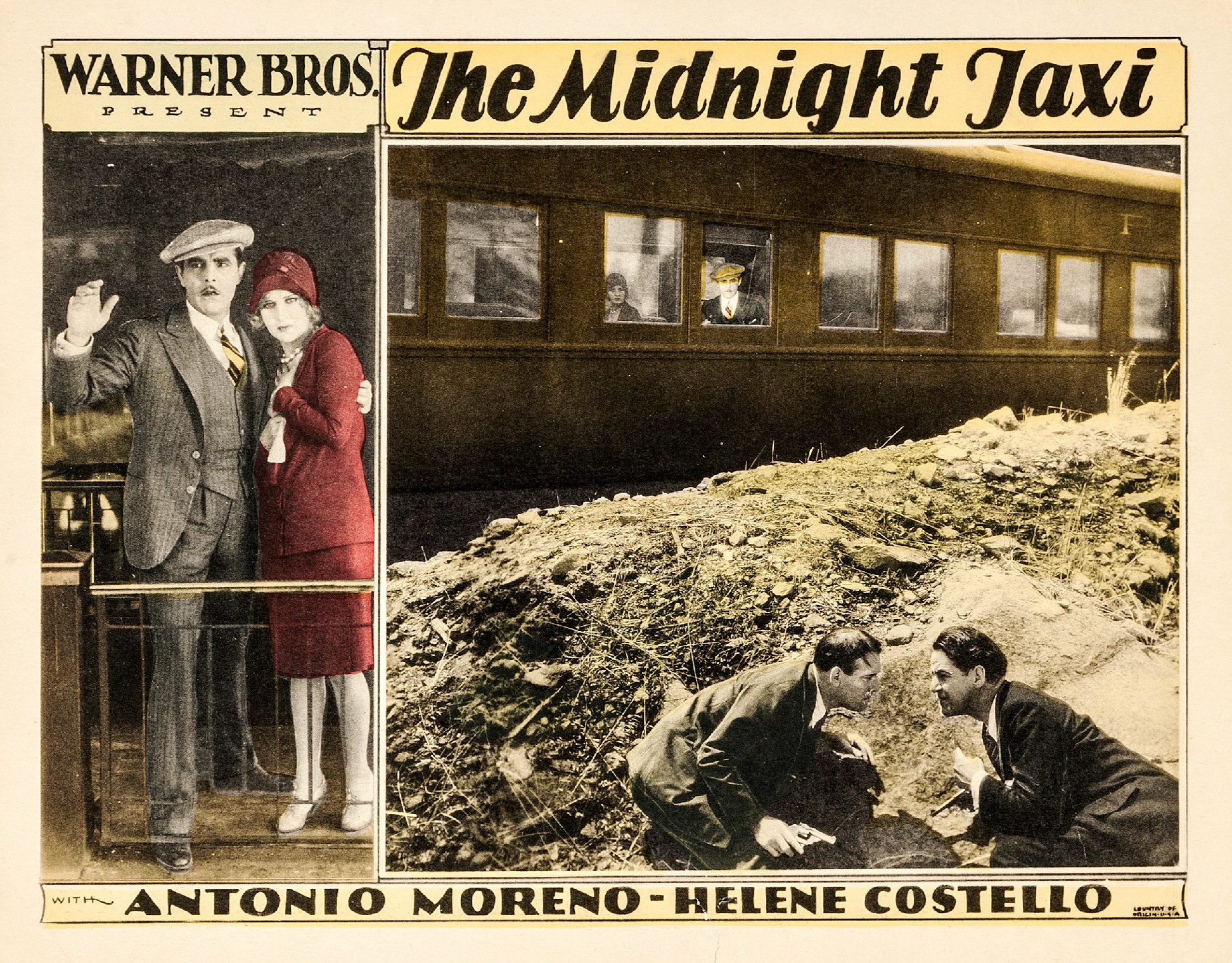
- Lobby card
- Directed by: John G. Adolfi
- Written by: Freddie Foy (writer); Joseph Jackson (titles)
- Screenplay by: Harvey Gates (& adaptation)
- Story by: "Gregory Rogers" (Darryl F. Zanuck)
- Starring: Antonio Moreno; Helen Costello; Myrna Loy
- Cinematography: Frank Kesson
- Edited by: Owen Marks
- Production company: Warner Bros. Pictures
- Distributed by: Warner Bros. Pictures
- Release date: September 1, 1928
- Running time: 64 minutes
- Country: United States
- Languages: Sound (Part-Talkie) (English Intertitles)

The Midnight Taxi is a 1928 American early sound part-talkie thriller film from Warner Bros. Pictures directed by John G. Adolfi and starring Antonio Moreno, Helen Costello, and Myrna Loy. In addition to sequences with audible dialogue or talking sequences, the film features a synchronized musical score and sound effects along with English intertitles. The soundtrack was recorded using the Vitaphone sound-on-disc system.

According to the Library of Congress, a copy of the film is extant at the British Film Institute's National Film and Television Archive.

== Plot ==
Tony Driscoll, a smooth-talking bootlegger, joins forces with Joseph Brant to finance a high-stakes liquor-smuggling operation from Los Angeles to Vancouver. Together, they pool $200,000 for the venture. To keep the cash safe while traveling north by train, Tony hides the money in the coat pocket of an unsuspecting young woman he meets on board, Nan Parker. Though charmed by her innocence, he keeps his secret—and his profession—to himself.

Brant, however, intends to double-cross his partner. He hires two gangsters, Lefty and Squint, to hold up the train and seize the bootlegging funds for himself. But Brant isn't the only one with betrayal on his mind—Al Corvini, another scheming associate, plots his own ambush with his own gang, including Dutch, Jack Madigan, and Rastus.

As tensions rise, Tony finds himself trapped aboard the train with enemies closing in. Guns are drawn during a standoff between rival factions—but the escalating violence is interrupted by the arrival of railroad detectives led by Detective Blake, who are actually on the hunt for stolen diamonds. Corvini, anticipating this, has planted the stolen jewels on Tony in an attempt to frame him. The ploy works—Tony is arrested and removed from the train under suspicion of diamond theft.

Released on bail, Tony makes a wild dash in an airplane to catch up with the train. Meanwhile, the gunmen detach the rear Pullman car—containing Nan and the hidden cash—and lay siege to it in hopes of retrieving the money. Inside the isolated compartment, Tony and Nan are barricaded and under fire from all sides.

What follows is a desperate fight against overwhelming odds. Tony, now determined to protect Nan and redeem himself, holds off the attackers until Detective Blake and police reinforcements arrive, engaging the gangsters in a full-on battle.

With the siege broken and the villains in custody, Tony turns his back on bootlegging. He pledges to go straight—and build a new, honest life with Nan by his side.

== Cast ==
- Antonio Moreno as Tony Driscoll
- Helene Costello as Nan Parker
- Myrna Loy as Gertie Fairfax
- William Russell as Joseph Brant
- Tommy Dugan as Al Corvini
- Bobby Agnew as Jack Madigan
- Pat Hartigan as Detective Blake
- Jack Santoro as Lefty
- William Hauber as Squint
- Paul Kreuger as Dutch
- Spencer Bell as Rastus

== See also ==
- Myrna Loy filmography
- List of early sound feature films (1926–1929)
