= Michael Visaroff =

Russian actor

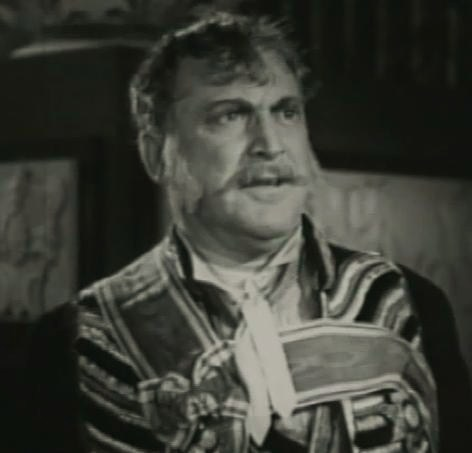
- Visaroff in The Son of Monte Cristo (1940)
- Born: Mikhail Semonovich Visaroff; December 18, 1889; Moscow, Russian Empire
- Died: February 27, 1951 (aged 61); Hollywood, California, U.S.
- Occupation: Actor
- Years active: 1925–1952
- Spouse(s): Nina Visaroff (m. 192?; died 1938)

Michael Simeon Visaroff (born Mikhail Semenonovich Vizarov (Russian: Михаил Семёнович Визаров); December 18, 1889 – February 27, 1951) was a Russian-born character actor, who worked in the United States on stage and screen.

== Biography ==
Visaroff was born in Moscow, Russian Empire. He was a graduate of the Russian Principal Dramatic School.

Visaroff started his career on stage: In July 1922, Visaroff came to the United States with a group from the Kamerny Theatre in Moscow. With a 14-week leave of absence from Russia, the group planned to present 12 plays, each lasting one week, in a Broadway theater.

He eventually made the transition to film, appearing in more than 110 films between 1925 and 1952. He was best known for his uncredited appearance in an early scene of Dracula (1931) as the nervous Hungarian innkeeper who, as Renfield is traveling to meet the Count, warns him about the actual existence of vampires.

== Personal life ==
When Visaroff came to the US in July 1922 he was already married to Nina Visaroff, according to the passenger list, and they had a daughter named Lydia. ?Yet they got married again in 1924 in New York.? His age in the passenger list is stated as 32 and in the naturalization file dated in March 1929, is given as 39 meaning that he was born in 1889 and not in 1892 as he claimed later in his life.

Census records for 1950 show he was aged 51 and living in Beverly Hills with a wife named Stella, aged 48, who was born in New York State. He died in Hollywood, California, from pneumonia in 1951.

== Partial filmography ==
- Paris (1926)
- The Nickel-Hopper (1926)
- Valencia (1926)
- The Sunset Derby (1927)
- Two Arabian Knights (1927)
- The Last Command (1928)
- Ramona (1928)
- Tempest (1928)
- The Night Bird (1928)
- We Americans (1928)
- Lullaby (1929)
- Marquis Preferred (1929)
- House of Horror (1929)
- Disraeli (1929)
- Du Barry, Woman of Passion (1930)
- Morocco (1930)
- Dracula (1931) (uncredited)
- Mata Hari (1931) (uncredited)
- Chinatown After Dark (1931)
- Arizona Terror (1931)
- Six Hours to Live (1932)
- Mark of the Vampire (1935)
- The Magnificent Brute (1936)
- The Soldier and the Lady (1937)
- I'll Give a Million (1938)
- Paris Honeymoon (1939)
- The Flying Deuces (1939) (uncredited)
- Everything Happens at Night (1939)
- Charlie Chan at the Wax Museum (1940)
- Never Give a Sucker an Even Break (1941) (uncredited)
- Reunion in France (1942) (uncredited)
- Paris After Dark (1943) - Paul
- For Whom the Bell Tolls (1943)
- Yolanda and the Thief (1945)
- Don Ricardo Returns (1946)
