= Cameo Kirby (1930 film) =

1930 film

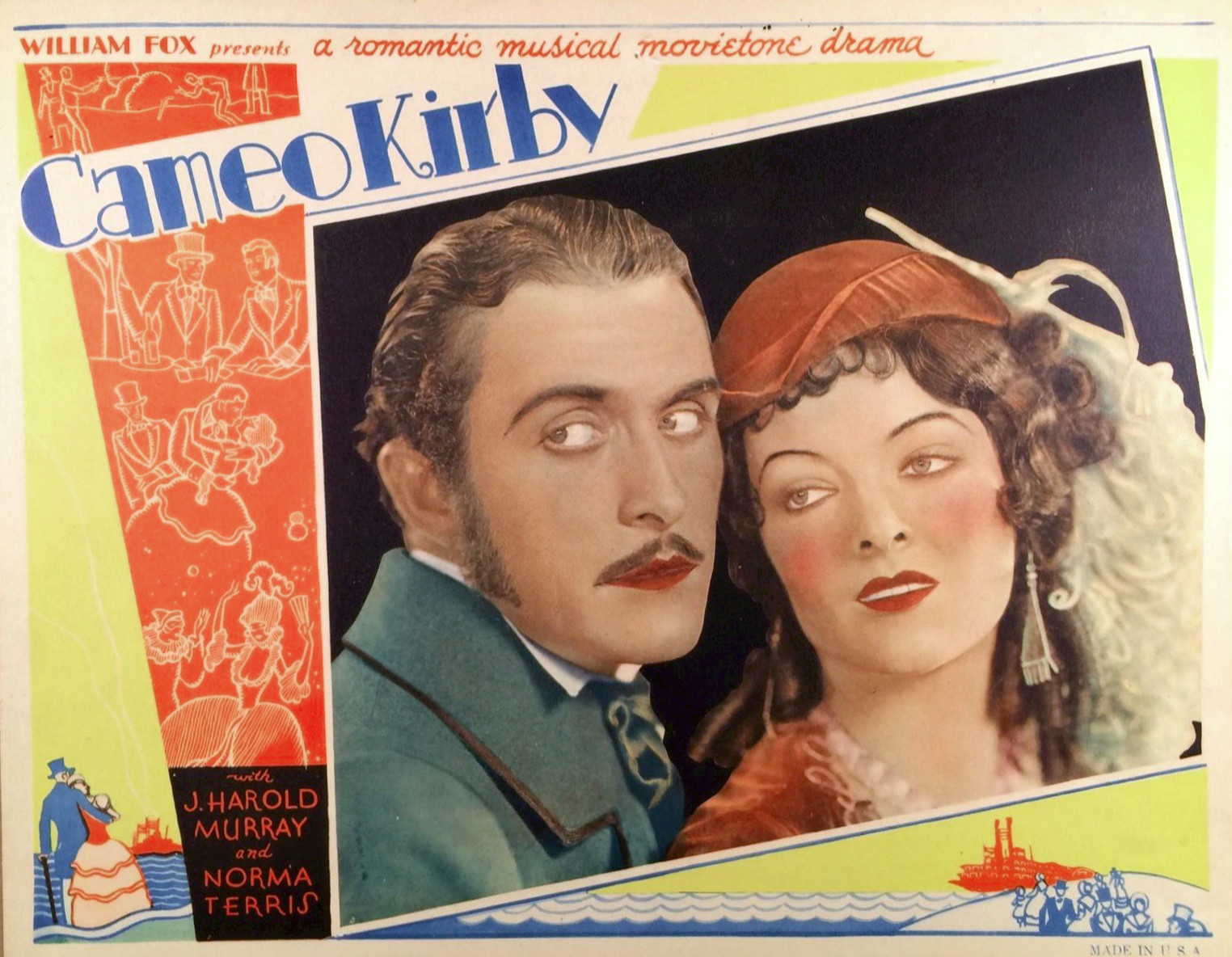
- Lobby card
- Directed by: Irving Cummings
- Written by: Marion Orth
- Based on: Cameo Kirby by Booth Tarkington; Harry Leon Wilson
- Starring: J. Harold Murray; Norma Terris; Douglas Gilmore; Robert Edeson; Myrna Loy; Charles Morton
- Cinematography: George Eastman; L. William O'Connell
- Edited by: Alex Troffey
- Music by: George Lipschultz
- Production company: Fox Film Corporation
- Distributed by: Fox Film Corporation
- Release date: January 12, 1930
- Running time: 70 minutes
- Country: United States
- Language: English

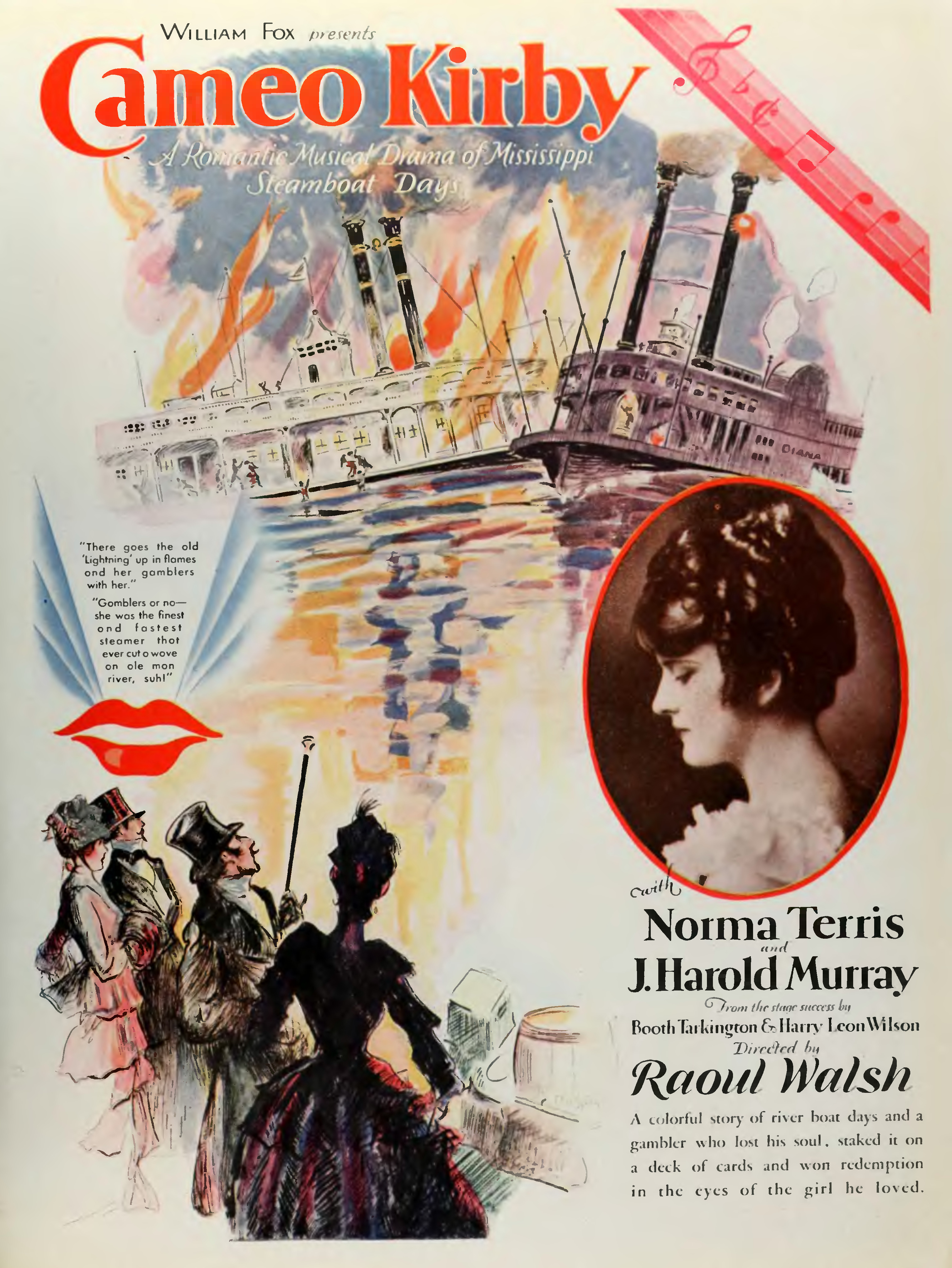
Cameo Kirby ad in The Film Daily, 1929

Cameo Kirby is a 1930 American romantic musical drama film directed by Irving Cummings and written by Marion Orth. It is based on the 1909 play Cameo Kirby by Booth Tarkington and Harry Leon Wilson. The film stars J. Harold Murray, Norma Terris, Douglas Gilmore, Robert Edeson, Myrna Loy and Charles Morton. The film was released on January 12, 1930, by Fox Film Corporation.

== Plot ==
Cameo Kirby, an honest riverboat gambler, rescues a girl from a gang of criminals in Louisiana, but she vanishes later. Cameo and a rival riverboat gambler, Moreau, then team-up with plans of fleecing a cotton planter of their yearly receipts.

== Cast ==
- J. Harold Murray as Cameo Kirby
- Norma Terris as Adele Randall
- Douglas Gilmore as Jack Moreau
- Robert Edeson as Colonel Randall
- Myrna Loy as Lea
- Charles Morton as Anatole
- Stepin Fetchit as Croup
- George MacFarlane as George
- John Hyams as Larkin Bunce
- Carrie Daumery as Claire Devezac
- Beulah Hall Jones as Poulette

== Music ==
The major songs to this musical were composed by Walter Donaldson (music) and Edgar Leslie (lyrics). The songs titles are listed below:

- "Romance"
- "After a Million Dreams"
- "Home Is Heaven - Heaven Is Home"

Additional songs include the following:

- "Drink to the Girl of My Dreams" written by L. Wolfe Gilbert and Abel Baer
- "Tankard and Bowl" written by Fred Strauss and Ed Brady
- "I'm a Peaceful Man" written by Fred Strauss and Ed Brady
- "Old Fashioned Waltz" written by George Lipschultz
- "Cubana" written by George Lipschultz

== See also ==
- Cameo Kirby (1914)
- Cameo Kirby (1923)

== Preservation status ==
A complete 35mm nitrate negative of the film survives at the Academy Film Archive in Hollywood.
