= Turn Back the Hours =

1928 film

- Directed by: Howard Bretherton
- Written by: Edward E. Rose (play); Jack Jungmeyer; Casey Robinson
- Starring: Myrna Loy; Walter Pidgeon; Sam Hardy
- Cinematography: Norbert Brodine
- Edited by: W. Donn Hayes
- Production company: Gotham Productions
- Distributed by: Lumas Film Corporation
- Release date: March 1, 1928
- Running time: 60 minutes
- Country: United States
- Languages: Silent; English intertitles

Turn Back the Hours is a 1928 American silent drama film directed by Howard Bretherton and starring Myrna Loy, Walter Pidgeon and Sam Hardy.

== Cast ==
- Myrna Loy as Tiza Torreon
- Walter Pidgeon as Philip Drake
- Sam Hardy as 'Ace' Kearney
- George E. Stone as Limey
- Sheldon Lewis as 'Breed'
- Josef Swickard as Colonel Torreon
- Ann Brody as Maria
- Nanette Valone as A Dancer
- Joyzelle Joyner as A Cantina Girl

== Preservation status ==
- Prints survive at Cinematheque Royale de Belgique (Brussels) and UCLA Film & Television Archive.

== Bibliography ==
- Emily W. Leider. Myrna Loy: The Only Good Girl in Hollywood. University of California Press, 2011.
