= Norma Terris =

American actress (1904–1989)

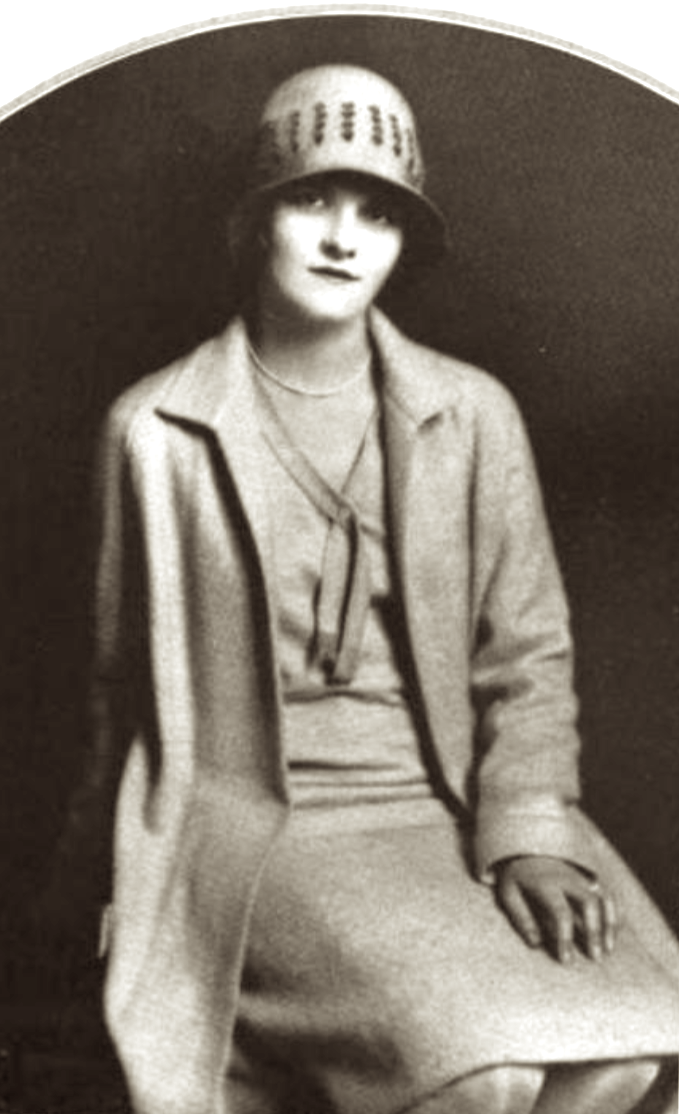
Norma Terris in 1928.

Norma Terris (born Norma Allison Cook; November 13, 1904 – November 15, 1989) was an American performer in musical theatre and vaudeville.

== Early years ==
Born in Columbus, Kansas, Terris was named after the heroine of Bellini's opera Norma. Her grandmother and grandfather taught in college, and both initially opposed her going into acting. Undeterred, as a child she put on her own productions in a barn and on the family's front porch. A cousin enabled her to study dancing and drama.

In December 1920, she and Max Hoffman, Jr. applied for a license to marry, but both were underage, so they did not wed then. They married in 1921, and divorced five years later.

== Career ==
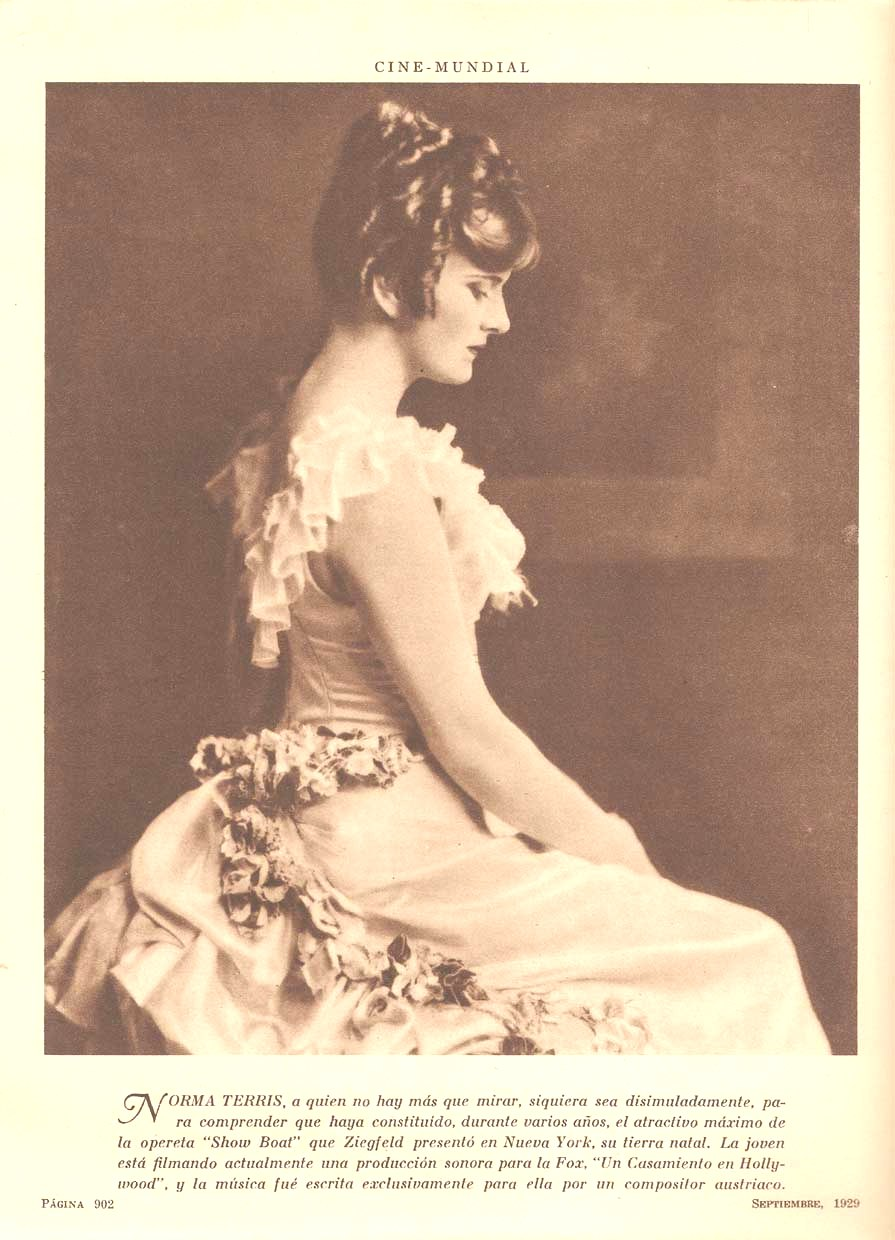
Terris, circa 1929

In the early 1920s, Hoffman and Terris debuted an act called "Junior and Terris" in Asbury Park, New Jersey. They went on to tour on the Interstate Circuit.

In vaudeville, Terris headlined two-a-day programs, appearing in productions by Schubert and Ziegfeld. She also gave a command performance for the Prince of Wales while she was in Europe.

Terris was known for her impersonations of popular public figures. She originated the roles of Magnolia in the original Broadway production of Show Boat in 1927. She reprised her role in the first New York revival of the show in 1932. However, she was not selected to reprise her role in the 1929 part-talkie film, nor in the 1936 film version.

Her Broadway credits included Queen O' Hearts (1922), A Night in Paris (1926), A Night in Spain (1927), The Well of Romance (1930), The Climax (1933), So Many Paths (1934), and Great Lady (1938).

For 10 seasons in the 1930s and 1940s, she starred in productions at the Muny Opera in St. Louis.

Terris was originally chosen to play the dual roles of Moonyean Clare and her niece Kathleen in Through the Years, Vincent Youmans's 1932 musical version of Jane Cowl's once-popular play, Smilin' Through, but she was replaced at the last minute.

She made two films during the early days of talking pictures – Married In Hollywood, and the 1930 version of Cameo Kirby, which was, like Show Boat, a riverboat musical involving a gambler. Cameo Kirby appears to be lost, and only twelve minutes of Married in Hollywood apparently survive.

== Marriage ==
Terris and Hoffman married in Houston while they were touring with their act.

Terris married Dr. Jerome Wagner and retired to Lyme, Connecticut, where she was an avid supporter of the Goodspeed Opera House, which eventually expanded and named their second theatre the Norma Terris Theatre. She later married Albert D. Firestone, son of William McKinley Firestone and Gladys Bigam Firestone of Greensburg, Pennsylvania. Terris and Albert Firestone spent winters at their Palm Beach, Florida, residence (where they were major donors to the Ballet Florida) and summered in Lyme, Connecticut. Mr. Firestone, who remained dedicated to Terris' remembrance, died in 1997 at the summer residence.

== Last years ==
In 1972, Terris donated 30 acres of land on which the Norma Terris Humane Education and Nature Center was created.

She performed two one-woman shows, An Evening with Norma Terris (1969 and 1971) and A Tribute To Jerome Kern (1985). She created The Norma Terris Fund "to encourage achievements in musical theater" in 1987, and in 1989 she created a scholarship in her name to sponsor an internship at the Goodspeed Opera House.

== Death ==
Terris died at her summer home in Lyme, Connecticut, on November 15, 1989, aged 85.

== Legacy ==
In 1984, Goodspeed Musicals created a second performance venue in Chester, Connecticut, which is named the Norma Terris Theatre.
