= Arline Judge =

American actress (1912–1974)

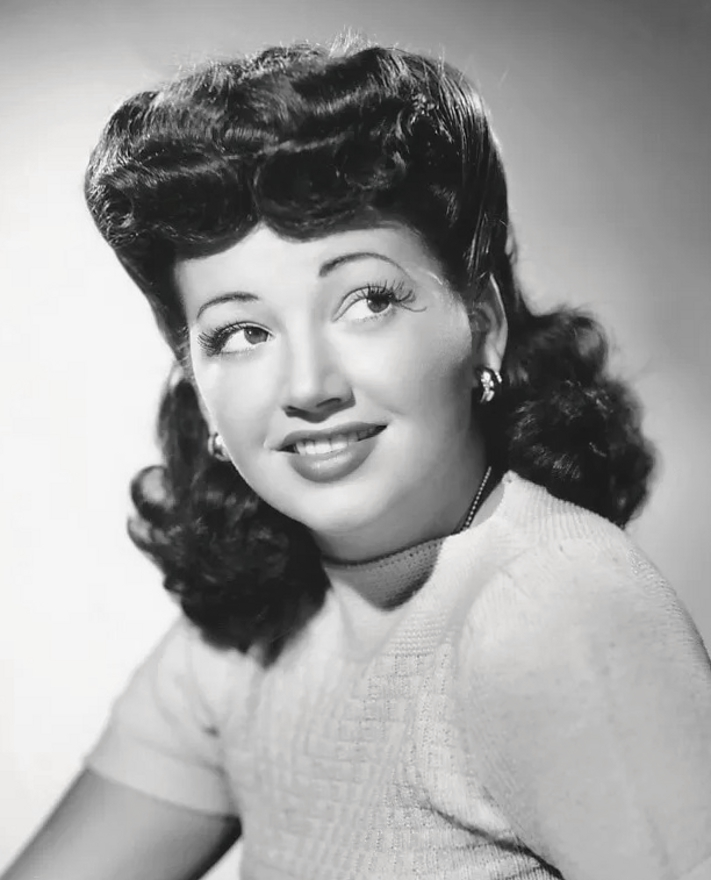
- Judge in 1941
- Born: Margaret Arline Judge; February 21, 1912; Bridgeport, Connecticut, U.S.
- Died: February 7, 1974 (aged 61); West Hollywood, California, U.S.
- Resting place: Saint Michael's Cemetery, Stratford, Connecticut
- Other names: Bella Grifiths; Arlene Judge
- Occupations: Actress; singer
- Years active: 1931–1964
- Spouses: Wesley Ruggles (m. 1931; div. 1937) Dan Topping (m. 1937; div. 1940) James Ramage Addams (m. 1942; div. 1945) Vincent Morgan Ryan (m. 1945; div. 1947) Henry J. Topping (m. 1947; div. 1948) George Ross III (m. 1949; div. 1950) Edward Cooper Heard (m. 1955; div. 1960)
- Children: 2

Margaret Arline Judge (February 21, 1912 – February 7, 1974) was an American actress and singer who worked mostly in low-budget B movies, but gained some fame for habitually marrying, including two brothers. Judge specialized in playing fairly earthy women of often questionable virtue and was at the peak of her career in her first years in Hollywood, starring in such pre-Code films as The Age of Consent and Sensation Hunters, films often made at poverty row studios. She also played supporting roles in some major releases by the major studios.

== Early years ==
Arline Judge was born in Bridgeport, Connecticut, the daughter of newspaperman John Judge and his wife, Margaret Ormond Judge. She was educated at St. Augustine's in Bridgeport and at New Rochelle College, leaving the latter to seek a career in acting.

== Stage ==
Judge made her theatrical debut in Broadway musicals and revues such as The Second Little Show and Silver Slipper. A part in George White's Scandals provided an opportunity to demonstrate her skills at comedy and dancing. Her screen career faded out in 1936, but she returned to the screen five years later, surprisingly able to continue to receive star and leading-lady parts for the most part, a feat many starlets were not able to obtain after a break in their career. All of her films after 1945, however, featured her in supporting roles.

== Film ==
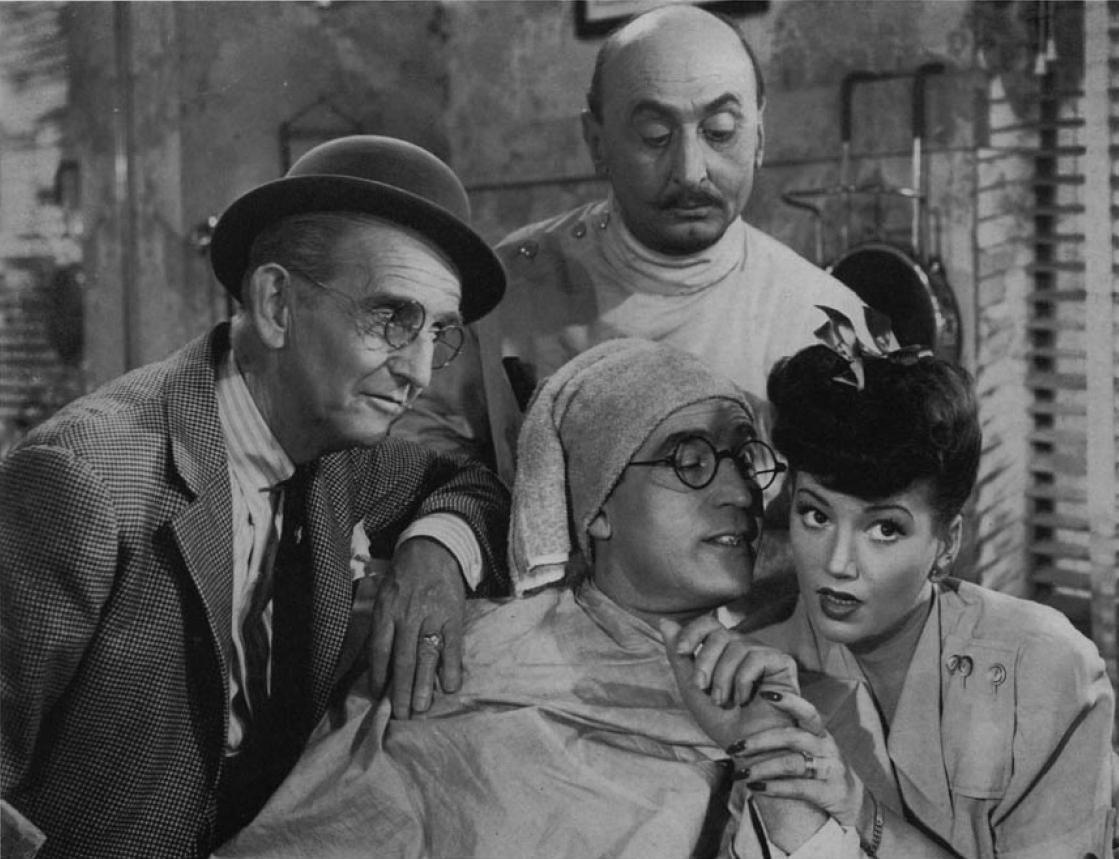
L. to R. : Jimmy Conlin, Harold Lloyd, Torben Meyer, and Arline Judge in The Sin of Harold Diddlebock (1947)

After meeting director Wesley Ruggles on a train, she got her start in films with his help, then married him. Nicknamed "One-Take Sally", her film career spanned the 1930s and 1940s.

Judge co-starred in When Strangers Meet (1934), among other films.

== Television ==
Judge had a few television appearances, the last one in 1964 as Emmalou Schneider in the Perry Mason episode "The Case of the Nautical Knot".

== Personal life ==
Judge was married seven times and had two sons: Wesley Ruggles Jr. by her first husband, Wesley Ruggles, and Dan Topping Jr. with second husband, Dan Topping, who from 1945 to 1964 was president and part owner of the New York Yankees. She married Ruggles in 1931 and divorced him on April 9, 1937, a few hours before she married Topping, whom she divorced in 1940.

Her other husbands were:

- James Ramage Addams (October 7, 1942 - July 24, 1945)
- Vincent Morgan Ryan (August 3, 1945 - April 23, 1947)
- Henry J. (Bob) Topping (April 29, 1947 - April 23, 1948, brother of second husband Dan Topping)
- George Ross III (January 18, 1949 - August 10, 1950)
- Edward Cooper Heard (April 9, 1955 - November 2, 1960)

Judge was found dead February 7, 1974, in her West Hollywood, California, apartment, age 61. She died of natural causes. She was interred in Saint Michael's Cemetery in Stratford, Connecticut.

== Filmography ==
Film
Year	Title	Role	Notes
1931	Laugh and Get Rich	Young Lady at Dance	(scenes deleted)
1931	Bachelor Apartment	Second Girl in Ladies Room	Uncredited
1931	White Shoulders	Minor Role	Uncredited
1931	Three Who Loved	Helga's Friend - Party Girl	Uncredited
1931	An American Tragedy	Bella Griffiths	Uncredited
1931	Are These Our Children	Florence "Flo" Carnes	
1932	Girl Crazy	Molly Gray	
1932	Young Bride	Maise	
1932	Is My Face Red?	Bee - Poster's Secretary	
1932	Roar of the Dragon	Hortense O'Dare	
1932	The Age of Consent	Dora Swale	
1933	Sensation Hunters	Jerry Royal	
1933	Flying Devils	Mrs. Ann Hardy	
1934	Looking for Trouble	Maizie Bryan	
1934	Shoot the Works	Jackie Donovan	
1934	Name the Woman	Betty Adams	
1934	The Party's Over	Phyllis	
1934	When Strangers Meet	Ruth Crane	
1934	One Hour Late	Hazel	
1934	The Mysterious Mr. Wong	Peg	
1934	Bachelor of Arts	Gladys Cottle	
1934	Million Dollar Baby	Grace Sweeney	
1935	George White's 1935 Scandals	Midgie Malone	
1935	College Scandal	Sally Dunlap	
1935	Welcome Home	Gorgeous	
1935	Music Is Magic	Theatre Customer	Uncredited
1935	Ship Cafe	Ruby	
1936	King of Burlesque	Connie	
1936	It Had to Happen	Miss Sullivan	
1936	Here Comes Trouble	Margie Simpson	
1936	Star for a Night	Mamie de la Mont	
1936	Valiant Is the Word for Carrie	Lady	
1936	Pigskin Parade	Sally Saxon	Alternative title: Harmony Parade
1936	One in a Million	Billie Spencer	
1941	Harvard, Here I Come!	Francie Callahan	Alternative title: Here I Come
1942	Law of the Jungle	Nona Brooks	
1942	The Lady Is Willing	Frances	
1942	Wildcat	Nan Deering	
1942	Smith of Minnesota	Gwyn Allen	
1942	The McGuerins from Brooklyn	Marcia Marsden	
1943	Girls in Chains	Helen Martin	
1943	Song of Texas	Hildegarde Gray	
1943	The Contender	Linda Martin	
1944	Take It Big	Pert Martin	
1945	G. I. Honeymoon	Flo LaVerne	
1946	From This Day Forward	Margie Beesley	
1947	The Sin of Harold Diddlebock	Manicurist	Alternative title: Mad Wednesday
1963	A Swingin' Affair	Marge - Johnny's Mother	
1963	The Crawling Hand	Mrs. Hotchkiss	Alternative titles: Don't Cry Wolf; The Creeping Hand
Television
Year	Title	Role	Notes
1953	Mr. and Mrs. North	Dot Jansen	1 episode
1964	Perry Mason	Emmalou Schneider	1 episode, (final appearance)
