= It Had to Happen =

1936 film by Roy Del Ruth

- Directed by: Roy Del Ruth
- Written by: Rupert Hughes; Kathryn Scola; Howard Ellis Smith
- Produced by: Darryl F. Zanuck
- Starring: George Raft; Rosalind Russell; Leo Carrillo; Arline Judge; Alan Dinehart; Arthur Hohl
- Cinematography: J. Peverell Marley
- Edited by: Allen McNeil
- Music by: Arthur Lange
- Distributed by: 20th Century Fox
- Release date: February 14, 1936
- Running time: 79 minutes
- Country: United States
- Language: English

It Had to Happen is a 1936 American drama film starring George Raft and Rosalind Russell. The movie was written by Kathryn Scola, and Howard Ellis Smith, and directed by Roy Del Ruth. It is based on the 1909 short story "Canavan, the Man Who Had His Way" by Rupert Hughes.

== Plot ==
An Italian, Enrico Scaffa, emigrates to America where he has a run-in with Beatrice, the elegant wife of a wealthy banker. Enrico gets a job working for a politician and works his way up to be a power in the city. Despite romancing his secretary Miss Sullivan, he crosses with Beatrice again and pursues her.

== Cast ==
- George Raft as Enrico Scaffa
- Rosalind Russell as Beatrice Nunes
- Leo Carrillo as Giuseppe
- Arline Judge as Miss Sullivan
- Alan Dinehart as Rodman Dreke
- Arthur Hohl as John Pelkey

== Production ==
Raft's casting was announced in September 1935. He was borrowed from Paramount. The same month Roy Del Ruth was announced as director. Leo Carillo was borrowed from Columbia. Constance Bennett was mentioned as a possible female lead.

Filming started November 1935.

== Reception ==
The film was a box office hit.

It was one of several films Raft made for Daryl F. Zanuck.
