= The House Across the Bay =

- Directed by: Archie Mayo; Alfred Hitchcock (uncredited)
- Written by: Myles Connolly; Kathryn Scola
- Produced by: Walter Wanger
- Starring: George Raft; Joan Bennett; Lloyd Nolan; Walter Pidgeon
- Music by: Werner Janssen
- Production company: United Artists
- Distributed by: United Artists
- Release date: March 1, 1940
- Running time: 88 minutes
- Country: United States
- Language: English
- Budget: $713,965
- Box office: $684,374

The House Across the Bay is a 1940 crime drama starring George Raft, Joan Bennett, Walter Pidgeon, and Lloyd Nolan. It was directed by Archie Mayo, produced by Walter Wanger, written by Myles Connolly and Kathryn Scola, and released by United Artists.

== Plot ==
A gangster, Steve Larwitt (George Raft), falls for one his singers, Brenda Bartley (Joan Bennett), at his nightclub. They marry and live the high life for a while. He gets set up and is sentenced to ten years at Alcatraz on charges of racketeering.

Brenda suspects Steve's shyster lawyer, Slant Kolma (Lloyd Nolan), having a hand in the conviction. She rents an apartment across San Francisco Bay with a view of the prison. She is befriended by another woman. Mary Bogale (Gladys George), whose husband is also jailed but also wants to have fun. One night they meet a man Tim Nolan (Walter Pidgeon) who becomes attracted by Brenda and starts pursuing her, much to her annoyance. He finally wins her over. However, she still loves her husband. Kolma tries to blackmail her and trap her, having sold off her jewelry for his "defense". He is jealous because he saw her at a restaurant with Tim.

Brenda finally confides in Mary and tells her about her problems. She returns to singing to earn money. When she visits her husband in jail, the Kolma is waiting for her. She hides the truth from Steve about the money being gone. Tim sees her singing at the nightclub and talking with customers. He continues to pursue her but although she has feelings for him, she wants to be faithful to her husband because she knows her love is the only thing that helps him get through his days. The treacherous lawyer is so full of jealousy he goes to tell Steve about Brenda and Tim.

Desperate, Steve escapes and looks for Brenda. He tries to kill her but Tim arrives in time with a gun and tells Steve about the lawyer setting him up and stealing their money. Steve escapes the nightclub and he tells Brenda to wait for him at a street corner. He goes looking for Kolma and finds and kills him. Then returns to the waterfront, swims out and allows the prison patrol trolling the water to capture him.

== Cast ==
- George Raft as Steve Larwitt
- Joan Bennett as Brenda Bentley
- Lloyd Nolan as Slant Kolma
- Walter Pidgeon as Tim Nolan
- Gladys George as Mary Bogel
- Peggy Shannon as Alice
- June Knight as Bebe
- Max Wagner as Jim
- Joe Sawyer as Charley
- Cy Kendall as Crawley
- Joseph Crehan as Federal Man
- Edward Fielding as Judge

== Production ==
The film was based on an original story by Myles Connolly. In 1939 it was reported Warner Bros were considering buying it as a vehicle for James Cagney and Marlene Dietrich. They could not come to an agreement and Walter Wanger bought the rights. Wanger made the film as part of what was meant to be a slate of six films for United Artists. Filming was pushed back so Wanger could make Foreign Correspondent.

George Raft was loaned by Warner Bros, dropping out of It All Came True, in which he was replaced by Humphrey Bogart. Walter Pidgeon was borrowed from MGM. Director Archie Mayo was borrowed from Sam Goldwyn. Bennett was under contract to Wanger.

Filming started 16 October 1939.

Some scenes of Pidgeon and Bennett in an airplane were filmed by Alfred Hitchcock as a favor to Wanger, for whom Hitchcock had directed Foreign Correspondent the same year.

Bennett and Wanger married after filming completed.

== Reception ==
=== Box office ===
The film recorded a loss of $101,334. It caused tension between Raft and Warner Bros, to whom he was under long-term contract, because Raft played a gangster who loses in the end in this United Artists film – the very sort of role he had refused to play for Warner Bros.

=== Critical ===
The New York Times called it a "somewhat less than fascinating tale of one of the more glamorous Rock-widows of Alcatraz" which was "old hat and scarcely worth its maker's bother—or yours." The Los Angeles Times thought it was "curiously (and unnecessarily) complicated."
