= Reunion in Rhythm =

1937 short film by Gordon Douglas

- Directed by: Gordon Douglas
- Produced by: Hal Roach
- Cinematography: Art Lloyd
- Edited by: William H. Ziegler
- Music by: Marvin Hatley
- Distributed by: MGM
- Release date: January 9, 1937
- Running time: 10 minutes
- Country: United States
- Language: English

Reunion in Rhythm (also known as Our Gang Follies of 1937) is a 1937 Our Gang short comedy film directed by Gordon Douglas. It was the 150th Our Gang short to be released.

== Plot ==
A follow-up to the musical-revue short Our Gang Follies of 1936, the one-reel Reunion in Rhythm was apparently filmed under the title Our Gang Follies of 1937. Its release title reflected the fact that, in addition to such current Gang members as Spanky, Alfalfa, Darla, Buckwheat, and Porky, the film also features return appearances by former "Our Gang" stalwarts Mickey Daniels, Mary Kornman, Joe Cobb and Mathew "Stymie" Beard.

The occasion is a class reunion at Adams Street Grammar School, where the students stage a show for the entertainment of the alumni. A running gag has Buckwheat attempting to recite "Little Jack Horner" (unannounced), as Spanky tries to keep him offstage. Musical highlights include "Baby Face", performed by Darla and Porky; and "Broadway Rhythm", performed by Spanky and the ensemble; and a medley of "Going Hollywood" (from Bing Crosby's 1933 musical of the same name) and "I'm Through with Love", sung by Alfalfa and Georgia Jean LaRue.

== Cast ==
=== The Gang ===
- Darla Hood as Darla
- Eugene Lee as Porky
- George McFarland as Spanky
- Carl Switzer as Alfalfa
- Billie Thomas as Buckwheat
- Georgia Jean LaRue as Georgia
- Pete the Pup as himself

=== Our Gang graduates ===
- Matthew Beard as Stymie
- Joe Cobb as Joe
- Mickey Daniels as Mickey Daniels
- Mary Kornman as Mary

=== Additional cast ===
- Rosina Lawrence - Miss Lawrence, the teacher
- Ernie Alexander - Band leader

=== Additional kids ===
Barbara Bletcher, Daniel Boone, Gloria Brown, John Collum, Barbara Goodrich, Paul Hilton, Sidney Kibrick, Elaine Merk, Harold Switzer

== See also ==
- Our Gang filmography
