= Rosina Lawrence =

British-Canadian actress and singer (1912–1997)

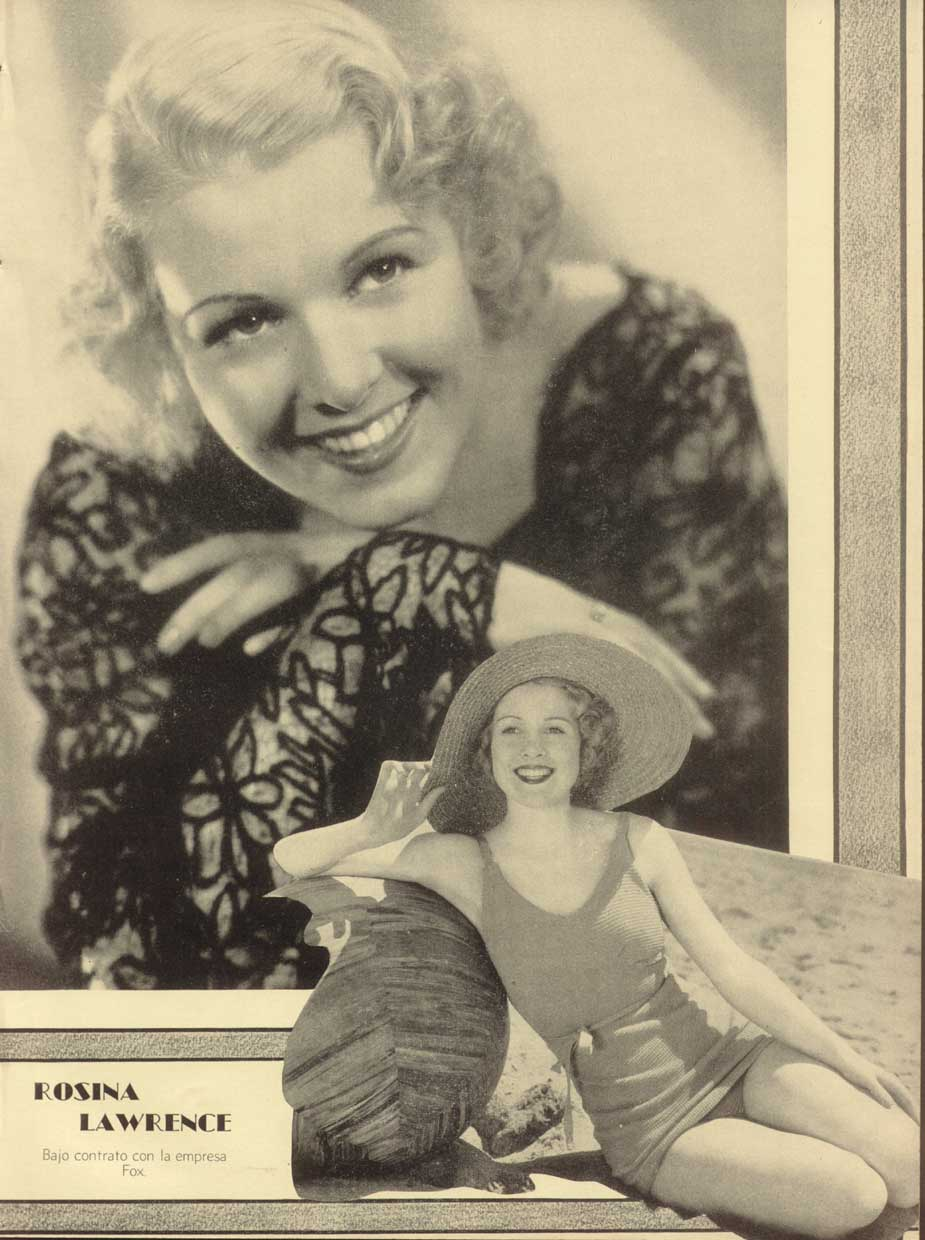
- Lawrence in 1935
- Born: Rosina May Lawrence; December 30, 1912; Westboro, Nepean Township, Ontario, Canada
- Died: June 23, 1997 (aged 84); New York City, U.S.
- Occupations: Actress; singer; dancer
- Years active: 1933–1972
- Spouses: Juvenal P. Marchisio (m. 1939; died 1973) John C. McCabe (m. 1987)
- Children: 3

Rosina May Lawrence (December 30, 1912 – June 23, 1997) was a British-Canadian actress and singer. She had a short but memorable career in the 1920s and 1930s in Hollywood before she married in 1939 and retired from entertainment. She is best known as the schoolteacher in the Our Gang comedies of 1936–37, and as the ingenue in the Laurel and Hardy feature Way Out West.

== Early years ==
Lawrence's family moved to Boston in 1922, then moved to California. In 1925, a fall on a school playground in Los Angeles resulted in paralysis on her left side. Dancing (suggested by a doctor as therapy for her weakened left leg and side) led to professional engagements.

Lawrence was one of the first women to swim Lake Tahoe in Nevada.

== Career ==
Lawrence's dancing led to work in films when she became Sally Eilers' double for a tap dance in Dance Team. Thereafter, she worked as a stand-in for Eilers in other films and gained dancing roles as well.

Lawrence made her film debut in the 1924 film A Lady of Quality. She received a contract from Twentieth Century-Fox in 1935, her first Fox effort being $10 Raise, an Edward Everett Horton comedy. Her work at Fox was undistinguished, her best-known role there being the ingenue in Charlie Chan's Secret.

Fox loaned her out to comedy producer Hal Roach for the 1936 feature Neighborhood House, ultimately released as a Charley Chase short subject. When her Fox contract was not renewed, she joined the Roach studio full-time, working with Chase, Our Gang, Patsy Kelly, Jack Haley, and Laurel and Hardy. Her singing voice, which had not been featured on film, came to the fore in Laurel and Hardy's Way Out West (1937); in addition to her own vocal, she provided the "high" soprano when Stan Laurel sang "Trail of the Lonesome Pine".

Lawrence showed little interest in promoting her screen career, shying away from the prearranged publicity stunts or photo shoots common to studio press agents. The easygoing Roach staff respected her wishes, and her tenure at Roach ended quietly. Her final performance was in the 1972 Italian comedy film Lost, in which she plays an American film star who causes great excitement when she appears in a small Italian town.

== Personal life ==
Lawrence and Judge Juvenal P. Marchisio married in June 1939, and she left acting to become a housewife. Marchisio died in 1973, and in 1987, Lawrence married John McCabe, a biographer of her onetime co-stars Laurel and Hardy.

Lawrence's parents became naturalized United States citizens in 1939. Lawrence's nationality was British and it is unclear if she ever became a United States citizen.

== Death ==
Lawrence died of cancer on June 23, 1997, in New York City, aged 84.

== Recognition ==
In 1936, the Hollywood Press Photographers Association named Lawrence as one of 10 Flashlighters' Starlets — young actresses the group considered most likely to succeed in film careers.

The Nepean Museum has recognized Lawrence by exhibiting publicity photographs and a variety of memorabilia related to her. It also shows a retrospective video of her career and videos of six films in which she appeared.

== Selected filmography ==
- The Angel of Broadway (1927)
- Welcome Home (1935)
- Music Is Magic (1935)
- Your Uncle Dudley (1935)
- $10 Raise (1935)
- Charlie Chan's Secret (1936)
- Mr. Cinderella (1936)
- Arbor Day (1936)
- General Spanky (1936)
- On the Wrong Trek (1936)
- Bored of Education (1936)
- Two Too Young (1936)
- Spooky Hooky (1936)
- Reunion in Rhythm (1937)
- Hearts Are Thumps (1937)
- Three Smart Boys (1937)
- Way Out West (1937)
- Nobody's Baby (1937)
- Pick a Star (1937)
- In the Country Fell a Star (1939)
