= $10 Raise =

1935 American comedy film directed by George Marshall

- Directed by: George Marshall
- Screenplay by: Henry Johnson; Lou Breslow
- Based on: The Ten Dollar Raise by Peter B. Kyne
- Produced by: Joseph W. Engel
- Starring: Edward Everett Horton; Karen Morley; Alan Dinehart; Glen Boles; Berton Churchill; Rosina Lawrence
- Cinematography: Harry Jackson
- Production company: Fox Film Corporation
- Distributed by: Fox Film Corporation
- Release date: May 4, 1935
- Running time: 70 minutes
- Country: United States
- Language: English

$10 Raise (also known as Mr. Faintheart and 10 Dollar Raise) is a 1935 American comedy film directed by George Marshall and starring Edward Everett Horton, Karen Morley, Alan Dinehart, Glen Boles, Berton Churchill and Rosina Lawrence. It was written by Henry Johnson and Lou Breslow based on the 1921 film The Ten Dollar Raise written by Peter B. Kyne. It was released on May 4, 1935, by Fox Film Corporation.

== Plot ==
Hubert T. Wilkins is a bookkeeper who is encouraged by his romantic interest, Emily Converse, to ask his boss, Mr. Bates, for a $10 pay rise. He is then fired and has no money for his and Emily's wedding. He seeks to invest in property to regain his fortune.

== Cast ==
- Edward Everett Horton as Hubert T. Wilkins
- Karen Morley as Emily Converse
- Alan Dinehart as Fuller
- Glen Boles as Don Bates
- Berton Churchill as Mr. Bates
- Rosina Lawrence as Dorothy Converse
- Ray Walker as Perry
- Frank Melton as Clark
- William "Billy" Benedict as Jimmy

== Reception ==
Variety wrote: "It isn't likely that anybody will get as excited about the plot as do the actors in this picture. Such an arrangement is always embarrassing and never an inducement at the box office. Besides which, $10 Raise has no special pull in its cast. A clever portrait of a poor sap by Edward Evert Horton and some samples of exceptionally good screen writing are the assets, but not sufficient. ... On top of sending its punches by Postal Telegraph, the punches thus sent are few and far between, and these few bear little weight behind them. All in all, it is one of those 'nice' plctures intended as a pleasantry but resulting in 60 minutes of inconsequential celluloid."
