= Dan Topping Jr. =

Daniel Reid Topping Jr. (born February 1, 1938) is a former executive with the New York Yankees of Major League Baseball (MLB).

The son of New York Yankees co-owner Dan Topping and actress Arline Judge, Topping joined the Yankees organization in 1961. In his first season, he worked on the grounds crew, in the ticket office, and in publicity. In 1962 he became general manager of the Yankees' minor league team in Fort Lauderdale.

Topping was the assistant general manager of the MLB Yankees for two seasons before becoming a vice president in 1965, after controlling interest in the team was sold to CBS. On May 8, 1966, he was named general manager after Ralph Houk returned to uniform as the team's field manager. Topping's father sold his remaining interests in the club to CBS on September 19, 1966 and 24 days later Lee MacPhail was named the club's new general manager. Topping remained a Yankees' vice president until his resignation in June 1967.

Preceded by Ralph Houk	New York Yankees General Manager; 1966; May 8 – October 13	Succeeded by Lee MacPhail
