= Brick Sullivan =

American film and television actor

- Sullivan in The Damned Don't Cry, 1950
- Born: John Lambertson Scroggs; July 28, 1899; South Dakota, U.S.
- Died: September 4, 1959 (aged 60); Los Angeles, California, U.S.
- Occupations: Film and television actor
- Spouse: Edna Claire Hanlon (m. 1924)

John Lambertson Scroggs (July 28, 1899 – September 4, 1959) was an American film and television actor. He was known for playing the recurring role of Deputy Brick in the American western television series The Life and Legend of Wyatt Earp.

== Life and career ==
Sullivan was born in South Dakota, the son of James and Nellie Scroggs. He began his screen career in 1936, appearing in the film Charlie Chan's Secret. In the same year, he appeared in the films The Preview Murder Mystery, Mr. Deeds Goes to Town, The Crime of Dr. Forbes, Cain and Mabel, Pennies from Heaven, Banjo on My Knee and That Girl from Paris.

Later in his career, Sullivan made his television debut in the syndicated anthology television series The Unexpected, starring Herbert Marshall. He guest-starred in numerous television programs including Gunsmoke, Wagon Train, Death Valley Days, The Lawless Years, Perry Mason, Tombstone Territory, The Adventures of Jim Bowie, Sugarfoot, The Californians, Rawhide and Tales of Wells Fargo, and played the recurring role of Deputy Brick in the ABC western television series The Life and Legend of Wyatt Earp. He also appeared in numerous films such as A Cry in the Night, Masterson of Kansas, Bad Men of Tombstone, I Was a Communist for the FBI, The Fighting Kentuckian, Jailhouse Rock, Eyes of Texas, Guys and Dolls, Give My Regards to Broadway, Fort Apache and From Here to Eternity.

Sullivan last appeared in the 1959 film Cry Tough.

== Death ==
Sullivan died on September 4, 1959, in Los Angeles, California, at the age of 60.
