= Nobody's Baby (1937 film) =

1937 film by Gus Meins

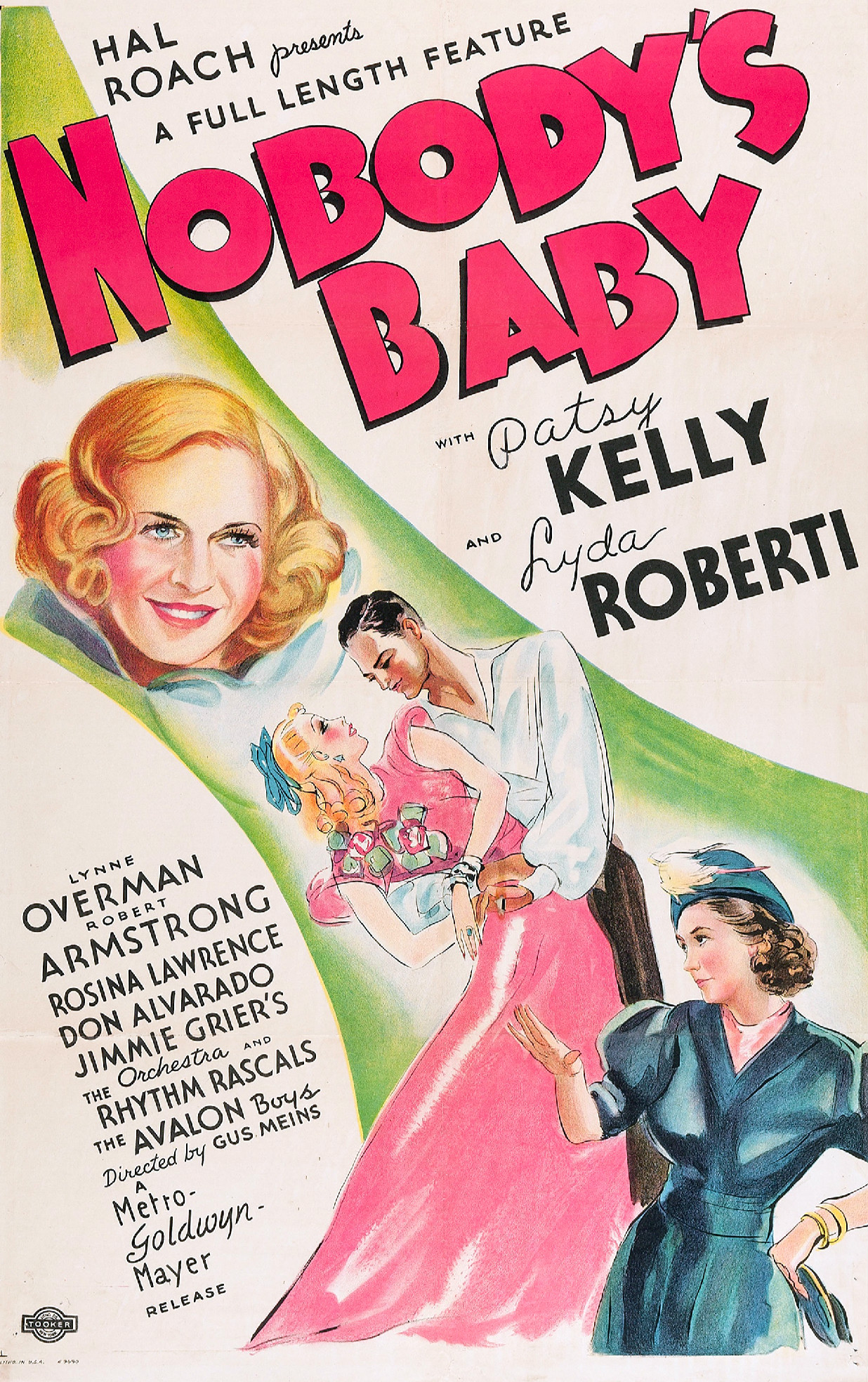
- Film poster
- Directed by: Gus Meins
- Screenplay by: Harold Law; Hal Yates; Pat C. Flick
- Story by: Harold Law; Hal Yates; Pat C. Flick
- Produced by: Hal Roach
- Starring: Patsy Kelly; Lyda Roberti; Lynne Overman; Robert Armstrong; Rosina Lawrence; Don Alvarado
- Cinematography: Norbert Brodine
- Edited by: Ray Snyder
- Music by: Marvin Hatley
- Production company: Hal Roach Studios
- Distributed by: Metro-Goldwyn-Mayer
- Release date: April 23, 1937
- Running time: 68 minutes
- Country: United States
- Language: English

Nobody's Baby is a 1937 American comedy film directed by Gus Meins and written by Harold Law, Hal Yates and Pat C. Flick. The film stars Patsy Kelly, Lyda Roberti, Lynne Overman, Robert Armstrong, Rosina Lawrence, and Don Alvarado. The film was released on April 23, 1937 by Metro-Goldwyn-Mayer.

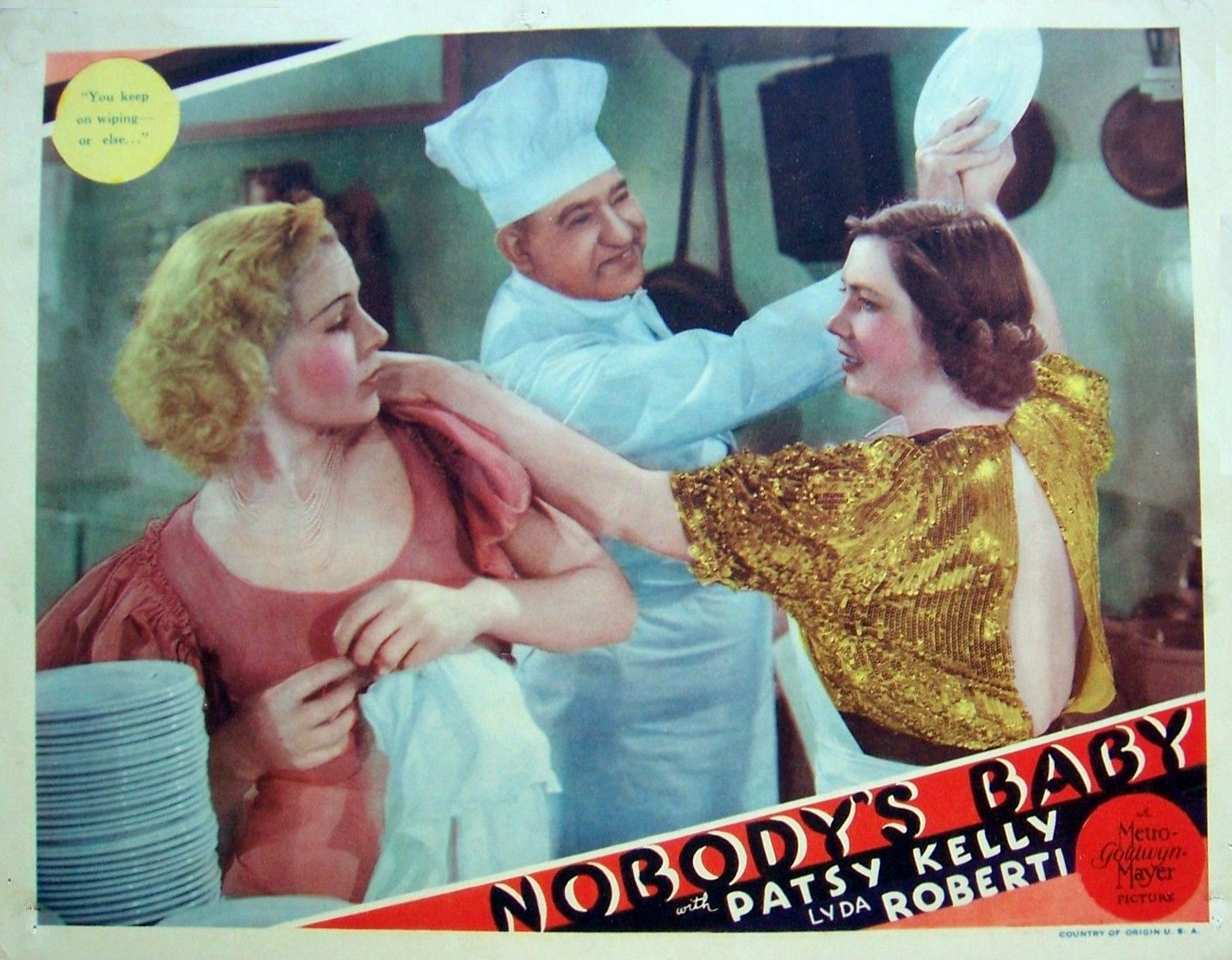
Lobby card

== Plot ==
Patsy and Lyda function essentially as a female Laurel and Hardy. After both fail to land jobs in radio, they end up rooming together. Patsy decides to become a nurse and Lyda follows; they actually fare somewhat better in these jobs. Along the way, they strike up chaste romances with a laconic detective (Overman) and a self-described hot-shot newspaperman (Armstrong). The plot finally rears its head with the arrival of an adagio dance team called Cortez and Yvonne (Alvarado and Lawrence). They're secretly married, but she leaves him in a huff after he insists on keeping it quiet—he doesn't know she's pregnant. Months later, she gives birth in the hospital where Patsy and Lyda work. They convince her to reconcile with Cortez and give him the news; she agrees, prevailing upon them to keep an eye on the baby. And then things really start to get out of hand.

== Cast ==
- Patsy Kelly as Kitty Reilly
- Lyda Roberti as Lena Marchetti
- Lynne Overman as Det. Lt. Emory Littleworth
- Robert Armstrong as Scoops Hanford
- Rosina Lawrence as Yvonne Cortez
- Don Alvarado as Tony Cortez
- Jimmy Grier and His Orchestra as Jimmy Grier and His Orchestra
- Tom Dugan as Bus Conductor
- Orrin Burke as Maurice
- Dora Clement as Miss Margaret McKenzie
- Laura Treadwell as Mrs. Hamilton
- Ottola Nesmith as Head Nurse
- Florence Roberts as Mrs. Mason
- Si Wills as Nightclub MC
- Herbert Rawlinson as Radio Audition Executive
- Rhythm Rascals as Vocal Trio
- Chill Wills as Amateur Hour Lead Quartet Singer
- Don Brookins as Amateur Hour Quartet Singer
- Art Green as Amateur Hour Quartet Singer
- Walter Trask as Amateur Hour Quartet Singer
