= Happy Land (film) =

1943 film by Irving Pichel

- 1943 theatrical poster
- Directed by: Irving Pichel
- Screenplay by: Kathryn Scola; Julien Josephson
- Based on: Happy Land (novel) by MacKinlay Kantor
- Produced by: Kenneth Macgowan
- Starring: Don Ameche; Frances Dee; Harry Carey; Ann Rutherford
- Cinematography: Joseph LaShelle
- Edited by: Dorothy Spencer
- Music by: Cyril J. Mockridge
- Distributed by: Twentieth Century-Fox
- Release date: December 3, 1943
- Running time: 75 minutes
- Country: United States
- Language: English
- Box office: $1.5 million

Happy Land is a 1943 drama film directed by Irving Pichel and starring Don Ameche. A World War II home front drama, it was based on the 1943 novel of the same name by MacKinlay Kantor.

== Plot ==
Lew Marsh receives a message that his only son, Rusty, has been killed in the war. Lew, a pharmacist in the small town of Hartfield, Iowa, is so grief-stricken, he neglects everything and isolates himself.

One day, Lew is visited by his dead grandfather's spirit. "Gramp" is troubled by Lew's prolonged mourning and the way it is affecting his life and those around him. Lew tries to send him away, but Gramp has "all the time in the world". Gramp takes him on a stroll through the streets of town, showing him flashbacks of events from his and Rusty's life.

It begins with Lew and other Hartfield residents returning home after serving in World War I. He finds out that his girlfriend Velma married a Marine just the month before. He meets Agnes soon after, falls in love, and marries her. Gramp becomes sick, but lives long enough through sheer stubbornness to see Rusty born.

Rusty turns out to be a perky boy with a mind of his own, who cares a lot for his friends. He becomes a member of the Boy Scouts. As a teen helping out at his father's pharmacy, he gives an old man medicine for his sick wife, even though the man does not have enough to pay for it, later putting money he has been saving for something special in the cash register.

Rusty falls in love for the first time at eighteen, with a girl named Gretchen Barry. She soon dumps him for a young man, which was expected by both Lew and Agnes. Lew tries to comfort him by giving him a glass of loganberry wine and toasting him as an adult. When Lenore Prentiss, a childhood friend, develops into a nice looking woman, Rusty takes notice.

Then the Nazis take control of Germany and invade Poland. Some of Rusty's friends join the Canadian armed forces, but Rusty continues helping out in the pharmacy. Then he leaves to study for his certificate. After some time, Rusty joins the Navy and is shipped out, bidding farewell to his parents and Lenore.

Back in the present, Gramp states that Rusty had a wonderful life up to his death. Lew is unconvinced, and Gramp tells him to go to pharmacy that evening. There he encounters a young sailor named Tony, someone Rusty often mentioned in his letters. Tony had agreed to tell Rusty's parents what happened if Rusty died.

Lew invites Tony home and introduces him to Agnes. Tony tells them about Rusty's last hours. After a torpedo struck their ship, Rusty was carrying a wounded man when a second one hit, flinging Tony into the water and was the last he saw of his friend. Lew then invites Tony to a glass of loganberry wine.

== Cast ==
- Don Ameche as Lew Marsh
- Frances Dee as Agnes Marsh
- Harry Carey as Gramp
- Ann Rutherford as Lenore Prentiss
- Cara Williams as Gretchen Barry
- Richard Crane as Russell 'Rusty' Marsh
- Harry Morgan as Anton 'Tony' Cavrek (credited as Henry Morgan)
- Minor Watson as Judge Colvin
- Dickie Moore as Peter Orcutt
- William Weber as Bill Beecher
- Oscar O'Shea as Father Case
- James West as Rusty - Ages 12 to 16
- Larry Olsen as Rusty - Age 5
- Bernard Thomas as Sam Kendall
- Adeline De Walt Reynolds as Mrs. Schneider
- Terry Masengale as Arch
- Edwin Mills as Bud
- Roseanne Murray as Mrs. Velma Jacobson
- James J. Smith as Everett Moore
- Mary Wickes as Emmy
- Walter Baldwin as Jake Hibbs
- Tom Stevenson as Mr. MacMurray
- Aileen Pringle as Mrs. Prentiss
- Richard Abbott as Reverend Wood
- Lillian Bronson as Mattie Dyer
- Ferris Taylor as Mayor
- Matt Moore as Mr. Prentiss
- Larry Thompson as Andy Jacobson
- Darla Hood as Lenore Prentiss - Age 12
- Ned Dobson Jr. as Jackie
- Paul Weigel as Pop Schmidt
- Jackie Averill as Tod
- Joseph E. Bernard as Clerk (credited as Joe Bernard)
- Houseley Stevenson as Sam Watson
- Elvin Field as Joe
- Juanita Quigley as Sally Pierce
- Milton Kibbee as Shep Wayne (credited as Milt Kibbee)
- John Dilson as Charles Clayton
- Leigh Whipper as Old Ben
- Marjorie Cooley as Teacher
- Robert Dudley as Old Man Bowers
- Reed Hadley as Off-Screen Narrator
- Pass Le Noir as Dr. Hammond (credited as Pass La Noir)
- William J. O'Brien as Chris - Drugstore Counterman
- Natalie Wood as Little Girl Who Drops Ice Cream Cone (uncredited)

== Production notes ==
An abridged version of MacKinlay Kantor's novel appeared in The Saturday Evening Post on November 28, 1942, and in the August 1943 issue of Reader's Digest.

Five-year-old Natalie Wood made her screen debut and appears in a bit part in the picture as a little girl who drops an ice cream cone.

Production lasted from June 13 to late July 1943. According to The Hollywood Reporter, news items, and studio publicity, the picture was shot on location in Santa Rosa, California, with additional scenes being filmed in nearby Healdsburg. The Time magazine review said that some scenes were shot in Sebastopol. A The Hollywood Reporter news item stated that the picture would have its premiere in sixty-one theaters in Iowa on December 2, 1943.

== Adaptations ==
Don Ameche starred in a Lux Radio Theatre broadcast of the story on April 10, 1944. A television adaptation of the film was presented on the 20th Century-Fox Hour (CBS Television) in February 1956, under the title "In Times Like These".
