= Hearts Are Thumps =

1937 film

- Directed by: Gordon Douglas
- Produced by: Hal Roach
- Starring: Darla Hood; George McFarland; Carl Switzer; Billie Thomas; Eugene Lee; Shirley Coates; Darwood Kaye; Sidney Kibrick; Rosina Lawrence
- Cinematography: Art Lloyd
- Edited by: Bert Jordan
- Music by: Marvin Hatley; Leroy Shield
- Distributed by: Metro-Goldwyn-Mayer
- Release date: April 3, 1937
- Running time: 10 minutes
- Country: United States
- Language: English

Hearts Are Thumps is a 1937 Our Gang short comedy film directed by Gordon Douglas. It was the 152nd Our Gang short to be released.

An audio clip from the short was included (out of sequence) in the beginning of the song "Tough Guys" by REO Speedwagon, from the album Hi Infidelity (1980).

== Plot ==
Spanky, Alfalfa and Buckwheat have no interest in observing Valentine's Day. To prove it, Spanky establishes the He-Man Woman-Haters' Club in order to serve as their united front against the holiday. However, Alfalfa quickly abandons the club when Darla flirtatiously winks at him and proceeds to invite him to lunch to exchange Valentines. Spanky decides to teach his buddy a lesson by slipping soap into Alfalfa's lunch while he and Darla are away. Alfalfa stumbles through lunch as pleasantly as possible without offending Darla.

At the conclusion of recess, Darla encourages Alfalfa to sing while she plays "Let Me Call You Sweetheart" on the piano. After a drink of water to settle his upset stomach, Alfalfa warbles through the song as soap bubbles flow out of his mouth. As Alfalfa runs from the classroom upon finishing the song, a vindicated Spanky tears up Darla's valentine for Alfalfa.

== Cast ==
=== The Gang ===
- Darla Hood as Darla
- George McFarland as Spanky
- Carl Switzer as Alfalfa
- Billie Thomas as Buckwheat
- Eugene Lee as Porky

=== Additional cast ===
- Shirley Coates as Henrietta
- Yoko Kawachichi as Asian girl
- Darwood Kaye as Waldo
- Sidney Kibrick as Woim
- Yoshi Nistu as Asian boy
- Rosina Lawrence as Miss Lawrence - the Teacher

=== Classroom extras ===
Beverley Baldey, Gloria Brown, Patty Brown, John Collum, Rex Downing, Elliott Fisher, Natalie Fisher, Joy Healey, Jackie Lindquist, Tommy McFarland, Beverley Lorraine Smith, Harold Switzer, Jerry Tucker, Robert Winckler

== See also ==
- Our Gang filmography
