= Neighborhood House (film) =

- Directed by: Charley Chase; Harold Law; Alan Hale, Sr.
- Screenplay by: Charley Chase; Harold Law; Richard Flournoy; Arthur Vernon Jones
- Produced by: Hal Roach
- Starring: Charley Chase; Rosina Lawrence; Darla Hood; George Meeker; Ben Taggart; Dick Elliott
- Cinematography: Art Lloyd
- Edited by: Ray Snyder
- Production company: Hal Roach Studios
- Distributed by: Metro-Goldwyn-Mayer
- Release date: 1936
- Running time: 55 minutes (production). 22 minutes (final release)
- Country: United States
- Language: English

Neighborhood House is a 1936 American comedy film directed by Charley Chase, Harold Law, and Alan Hale, Sr. and written by Charley Chase, Harold Law, Richard Flournoy, and Arthur Vernon Jones. The film stars Charley Chase, Rosina Lawrence, Darla Hood, George Meeker, Ben Taggart, and Dick Elliott. Originally produced as a 55-minute feature, first titled Bank Night and then Neighborhood House, the film faced legal action from the actual Bank Night corporation, which organized cash giveaways in American movie theaters. As a result, the film was withdrawn, cut down to 22 minutes, and released as a standard Charley Chase short by Metro-Goldwyn-Mayer.

The often-cited release date of May 9, 1936, is erroneous; this was when the unreleased feature version was scheduled for distribution. The Motion Picture Herald trade review of the feature was published on May 9. The short-subject version was released later in the year.

== Plot ==
Charley Chase, his wife, and their daughter anticipate their weekly visit to the local movie theater, a "neighborhood house." The special attraction of the evening is "Bank Night," a cash award given to the holder of a lucky-number ticket. The theater manager, a former beau of Mrs. Chase, greets the Chases cordially and wishes them luck. He selects Chase's young daughter to pick the lucky number, but she calls out Chase's number. The audience cries fraud, so another number is chosen; this time, it belongs to the little girl herself. Again, the audience howls in protest. A third number is chosen, and it belongs to Mrs. Chase. After the manager awards her the $500 jackpot, the outraged audience members form a motorcade, honking their horns furiously, and follow the embarrassed Chase family all the way home. Mortified, Chase resolves the situation by staging his own "Bank Night" giveaway at the theater.

== Cast ==
- Charley Chase as Charley Chase
- Rosina Lawrence as Rosina Chase
- Darla Hood as Mary Chase
- George Meeker as Adolph, theater manager
- Dick Elliott as Mr. Perkins, Charley's boss
- Ben Taggart as Clancy, the cop
- Harry Bowen as Theatre patron

== Deleted material ==
The 55-minute version included a subplot in which gangsters raid the theater and hold Chase captive; this footage was removed. Featured players Margaret Irving, George Chandler, Charles Lane, and Tom Dugan were cast in the feature, but they do not appear in the revised short-subject version.
