= Night After Night (film) =

1932 film

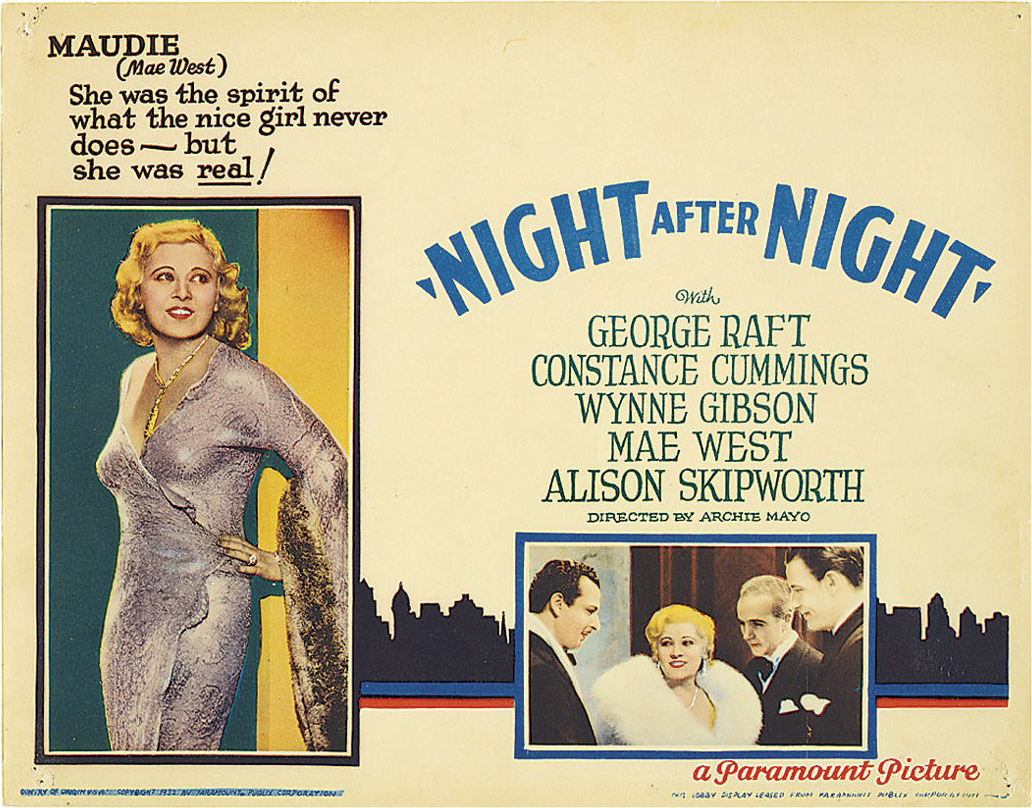
- Lobby card
- Directed by: Archie Mayo
- Written by: Kathryn Scola (continuity)
- Screenplay by: Vincent Lawrence
- Based on: Single Night; 1932 story in Hearst's International Cosmopolitan by Louis Bromfield
- Produced by: William LeBaron (uncredited)
- Starring: George Raft; Constance Cummings; Mae West
- Cinematography: Ernest Haller
- Production company: Paramount Pictures
- Distributed by: Paramount Pictures
- Release date: October 14, 1932 (US)
- Running time: 70 or 76 minutes
- Country: United States
- Language: English

Night After Night is a 1932 American pre-Code drama film starring George Raft, Constance Cummings, and Mae West in her first movie role. Others in the cast include Wynne Gibson, Alison Skipworth, Roscoe Karns, Louis Calhern, and Bradley Page. Directed by Archie Mayo, it was adapted for the screen by Vincent Lawrence and Kathryn Scola, based on the Cosmopolitan story "Single Night" by Louis Bromfield, with West allowed to contribute to her lines of dialogue, for which she was uncredited.

Although Night After Night is not a comedy, it has many comedic moments, especially with the comic relief of West, who plays a supporting role in her screen debut.

== Plot ==
Joe Anton is a speakeasy owner who falls in love with socialite Miss Healy. He takes lessons in high-class mannerisms from Mabel Jellyman. Joe does not know that Miss Healy only pays attention to him because he lives in the elegant building that her family lost in the Wall Street Crash of 1929. After a risky encounter with his old flame Iris Dawn involving a gun, Miss Healy kisses him. Joe is ready to marry her, but she is engaged to her friend Mr. Bolton, although admits she is just marrying him for his money.

Infuriated at her gold-digging, Joe tears into her, and he decides to abandon his upper-class aspirations. Miss Healy follows him back to the speakeasy to tell him off, but she realizes that she has genuinely fallen in love with him. Meanwhile, Maudie Triplett befriends Mrs. Jellyman and offers to hire her as a hostess in one of her elegant beauty parlors.

== Cast ==
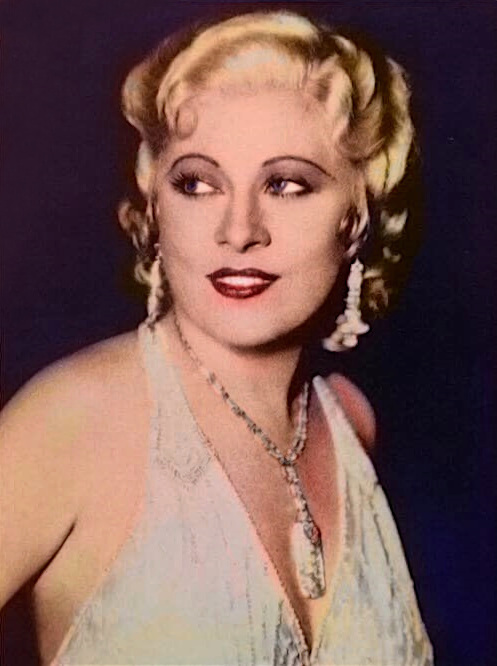
Mae West in publicity photo for Night After Night

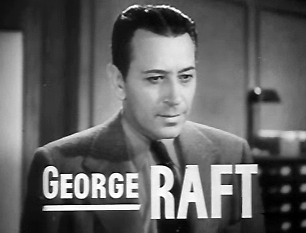
George Raft

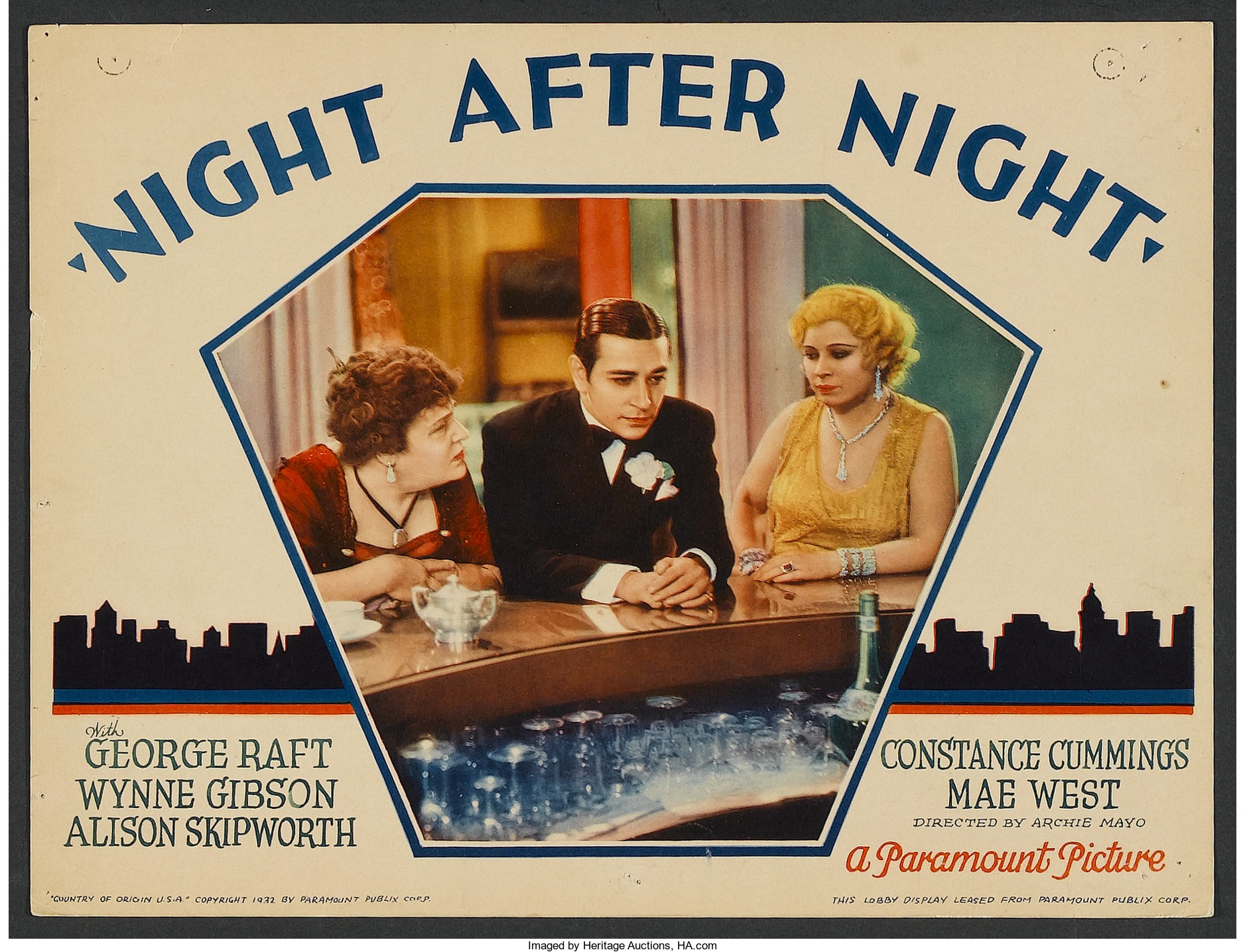
Lobby card featuring Alison Skipworth, George Raft, and Mae West

- George Raft as Joe Anton
- Constance Cummings as Miss Jerry Healy
- Wynne Gibson as Iris Dawn
- Mae West as Maudie Triplett
- Alison Skipworth as Miss Mabel Jellyman
- Roscoe Karns as Leo
- Louis Calhern as Dick Bolton
- Bradley Page as Frankie Guard
- Al Hill as Blainey
- Harry Wallace as Jerky
- George Templeton as Patsy
- Marty Martyn as Malloy
- Tom Kennedy as Tom (the bartender)

== Production ==
West portrays a fictionalized version of Texas Guinan. The film is primarily remembered as the launching pad for her career. Raft campaigned to cast his friend and former employer Guinan herself, but the studio opted for West, since she was nine years younger. Raft believed that the part would have launched a major film career for Guinan (then aged 48), which proved to be the case for West, instead. West was reportedly a fan of Guinan's and incorporated some of the flamboyant Guinan's ideas into her own acts.

The film was Raft's first leading role and came about due to response to his work in Scarface. According to Filmink, "this picture is best remembered today for introducing Mae West to cinema audiences – and she's brilliant – but Raft was excellent too as a former gangster turned nightclub manager who is having a midlife crisis."

== Accolades ==
The film is recognized by American Film Institute in these lists:

- 2005: AFI's 100 Years...100 Movie Quotes:
  - Cloakroom Girl: "Goodness, what beautiful diamonds!"

Maudie Triplett: "Goodness had nothing to do with it, dearie."
– nominated
