= Mr. Cinderella =

1936 film by Edward Sedgwick

- Directed by: Edward Sedgwick
- Screenplay by: Richard Flournoy; Arthur V. Jones
- Story by: Jack Jevne; Edward Sedgwick
- Produced by: Edward Sedgwick; Hal Roach
- Starring: Jack Haley; Betty Furness; Arthur Treacher; Raymond Walburn; Robert McWade; Rosina Lawrence
- Cinematography: Milton R. Krasner
- Edited by: Jack Ogilvie
- Music by: Marvin Hatley
- Production company: Hal Roach Studios
- Distributed by: Metro-Goldwyn-Mayer
- Release date: October 23, 1936
- Running time: 75 minutes
- Country: United States
- Language: English

Mr. Cinderella is a 1936 American comedy film directed by Edward Sedgwick and written by Richard Flournoy and Arthur V. Jones. The film stars Jack Haley, Betty Furness, Arthur Treacher, Raymond Walburn, Robert McWade and Rosina Lawrence. It was released on October 23, 1936 by Metro-Goldwyn-Mayer.

== Plot ==
Automotive mogul Peter Randolph desperately needs money for a diesel engine that he is developing. He asks his daughter Pat to extend a dinner invitation to eccentric millionaire Aloysius P. Merriweather, a man whom they have never met. Merriweather, to amuse himself, sends his barber Joe Jenkins in his place.

Aloysius is on his way to meet his girlfriend Mazie when he is struck by a car. Joe is smitten with Pat, but things go wrong; he capsizes their boat and then sets her father's cabin on fire. They spend the night together on a beach, and Aunt Penelope impulsively announces Pat's engagement to marry Joe, believing that he is Aloysius. Joe maintains the ruse at Pat's behest, trying to avoid a family scandal, and befriends the wealthy Mr. Watkins. Mazie reads about the engagement and appears, causing trouble, as does her brother Spike, who wants to kill her cheating boyfriend. Aloysius awakens in time to prevent Joe from being killed.

== Cast ==
- Jack Haley as Joe Jenkins
- Betty Furness as Patricia 'Pat' Randolph
- Arthur Treacher as Watkins
- Raymond Walburn as Peter Randolph
- Robert McWade as Mr. J.J. Gates
- Rosina Lawrence as Maizie Merriweather
- Monroe Owsley as Aloysius P. Merriweather
- Kathleen Lockhart as Aunt Penelope 'Penny' Winfield
- Edward Brophy as Detective McNutt
- Charlotte Wynters as Martha
- Tom Dugan as Spike Nolan
- Iris Adrian as Lil
- Toby Wing as Lulu
- Morgan Wallace as Mr. Emmett Fawcett
- Arthur Aylesworth as Mr. Simpson
- John Hyams as Mr. Wilberforce
- Leila McIntyre as Mrs. Wilberforce
