= Bored of Education =

1936 film

- Directed by: Gordon Douglas
- Written by: Robert F. McGowan; Carl Harbaugh; Hal Law; Hal Yates
- Produced by: Hal Roach
- Starring: George McFarland; Carl Switzer; Eugene Gordon Lee; Billie Thomas; Darla Hood; Rosina Lawrence
- Cinematography: Art Lloyd
- Edited by: William H. Ziegler
- Distributed by: Metro-Goldwyn-Mayer
- Release date: August 20, 1936
- Running time: 10' 06"
- Country: United States
- Language: English

Bored of Education is a 1936 Our Gang short comedy film directed by Gordon Douglas. Produced by Hal Roach and released to theaters by Metro-Goldwyn-Mayer, it was the 146th entry in the Our Gang series to be released.

== Plot ==
It is the first day of school and the kids wait on the school steps with long faces and pouted lips. Worried about the new teacher they'll be getting this term, Spanky and Alfalfa come up with a scheme to get themselves excused from school: Spanky has Alfalfa pretend he has a toothache, going as far as to stuff a balloon in his mouth to sell the idea.

Unknown to the kids, however, the new school teacher, Miss Lawrence, has overheard Spanky and Alfalfa's scheming and has ordered ice cream as a first-day surprise for the class. She sees right through Alfalfa's fibs about being too sick to sing "Good Morning to You" with the rest of the class, and knowingly grants him an excuse to go home (and Spanky an excuse to take him home). The two boys' triumph backfires when they see the ice cream man as he makes his delivery to the rest of their class. Now needing to find a way to get back into school, Spanky pops the balloon in Alfalfa's mouth, and explains to Miss Lawrence, "Funny thing, teacher; he's all well now".

Miss Lawrence agrees to let the boys back in for the ice cream party, but only if Alfalfa will make up for not singing "Good Morning" by rendering another song. However, Alfalfa has accidentally swallowed the stopper from the balloon that constituted his "toothache", so as he steps in front of the class to sing '"Believe Me, if All Those Endearing Young Charms'", a strange wheeze accompanies every breath he takes between lines. At the conclusion of his song, Spanky and Alfalfa go to get their ice cream only to find that it has melted, but the kind and clever Miss Lawrence hands the boys two fresh ice cream bars.

== Notes ==
A remake of Teacher's Pet, Bored of Education was also the first Our Gang entry in the series' revamped one-reel (ten-minute) format, after 14 years of two-reel and three-reel entries. Bored of Education won Hal Roach his only Academy Award for Our Gang, the 1937 Academy Award for Short Subjects (One-Reel).

Bored of Education was also the first Our Gang film directed by Gordon Douglas. Douglas, who had served as assistant director on Our Gang for some time, made his directorial debut on a 1935 Hal Roach All Stars short, The Infernal Triangle. Douglas would remain Our Gang's senior director through 1938. With the series now in one-reel format, Douglas had to modify the looser approaches of his predecessors, Robert F. McGowan and Gus Meins, and turned the Our Gang series into slicker, more streamlined shorts based around situation comedy. Ironically, Douglas has a walk-on part in Teacher's Pet as a caterer)

By 1936, producer Hal Roach, who had built his studio around popular two-reel comedies, had slowly begun phasing out his short subjects production as movie theaters opted for double feature programs instead of the traditional program of selected short subjects and one feature. Roach had successfully moved his biggest stars, Laurel and Hardy, to full-time feature production in 1935. Rather than cancel Our Gang, however, Roach continued the series at the behest of his distributor, Louis B. Mayer of MGM. Keeping the series in production, however, required Roach to halve the lengths of the Our Gang films from two-reels to one.

Also formally introduced to Our Gang in Bored of Education was Roach actress Rosina Lawrence as Our Gang's new schoolteacher "Miss Jones". Lawrence appeared in five more Our Gang shorts during the 1936-37 cycle of shorts.

Bored of Education won Roach the Academy Award for Short Subjects (One-Reel), the only Our Gang film so honored. In their review for the short in their book The Little Rascals: The Life and Times of Our Gang, film historians Leonard Maltin and Richard W. Bann felt that the award seemed to be "a product of whim or timing, rather than strictly a consideration of merit", noting earlier and later shorts–Teacher's Pet among them–they felt were overlooked.

Bored of Education was preserved by the Academy Film Archive, in conjunction with the UCLA Film and Television Archive, in 2013. In 2022, Bored of Education was digitally re-scanned from the original 35mm film master prints using updated transfer technology, and further restored by ClassicFlix, who licensed the entire Hal Roach-era Our Gang series for release on Blu-ray.

The short's title is a pun on the term "Board of Education", a government agency in the United States that is responsible for the overall management of its public school system.

== Cast ==
=== The Gang ===
- Darla Hood as Darla
- Eugene Lee as Porky
- George McFarland as Spanky
- Carl Switzer as Alfalfa
- Billie Thomas as Buckwheat
- Pete The Pup as Himself

=== Additional cast ===
- Rosina Lawrence as Miss Lawrence
- Jack Egan as Ice cream attendant

=== Classroom extras ===
Patsy Barry, Daniel Boone, John Collum, Joe "Corky" Geil, Barbara Goodrich, Sidney Kibrick, Robert Lentz, Patsy May, Tommy McFarland, Dickie De Nuet, Donald Proffitt, Harold "Slim" Switzer,

== See also ==
- Our Gang filmography
