= Bachelor of Arts (film) =

1934 American drama film

- Directed by: Louis King
- Screenplay by: Lamar Trotti
- Based on: Bachelor of Arts (novel) by John Erskine
- Produced by: John Stone
- Starring: Tom Brown; Anita Louise; Henry B. Walthall; Mae Marsh; Arline Judge; Frank Albertson
- Cinematography: L. William O'Connell
- Music by: Samuel Kaylin
- Production company: Fox Film Corporation
- Distributed by: Fox Film Corporation
- Release date: November 23, 1934
- Running time: 74 minutes
- Country: United States
- Language: English

Bachelor of Arts is a 1934 American drama film directed by Louis King and written by Lamar Trotti. The film stars Tom Brown, Anita Louise, Henry B. Walthall, Mae Marsh, Arline Judge and Frank Albertson. The film was released on November 23, 1934, by Fox Film Corporation.

== Plot ==
Alexander "Alec" Hamilton, Jr., a headstrong, but likable freshman at the state college, falls in love at first sight with co-ed Mimi Smith when he sees her standing over him after he gets involved in a brawl at an antiwar speech. After nearly getting into a couple of more fights, Alec, whose father, the owner of Hamilton Iron Works, is sending him through college, proposes to Mimi, who works her way through as a dining hall cashier, but she only agrees to date. After Alec breaks a date with Mimi when his fraternity initiation turns into an all-night drinking party, he meets a radical reading Karl Marx's Das Capital and, convinced that Mimi has not come up against the "realities of life," takes her to a rally in the park. The rally soon turns into a brawl when the people congregated resent Alec and Mimi's intrusion. Mimi and Alec become engaged, but when Alec, on a whim, buys a car instead of her engagement ring, she calls him a spoiled child and says that they should not see each other again. After she sees him driving with Gladys Cottle, who tries to make her jealous, Mimi returns Alec's fraternity pin. As Alec gets acquainted with one of his instructors, Professor Barth, the professor's wife Mary, who is ill, and Robert Neal, an excellent student who uses a wheelchair, he begins to mature; however, when he thinks that Mimi and Professor Donald Woolsey, who has fallen in love with her, are making fun of his singing at Glee Club practice, Alec rebukes Mimi, goes drinking with Gladys and neglects his studies. After the dean reprimands Alec and he is arrested for reckless driving, Mimi writes his father and convinces him not to give Alec money so that he will have to work. Alec gets a job in the University Cafe, and when he learns from Neal that Mrs. Barth will die if she does not get to a better climate soon, he retrieves his fraternity pin from Gladys, who gives it up for a kiss when she sees Mimi watching, hocks it with his watch and sells his blood to get $200, which he leaves anonymously for Mary and Professor Barth so that they can go to the desert. After Mimi reprimands Alec for kissing Gladys, Woolsey, who saw Alec leave the money, tells Mimi of the deed and explains that Alec needed contact with something real: the Barths. Mimi stops Alec from leaving school, and they are reconciled.

== Cast ==
- Tom Brown as Alec Hamilton
- Anita Louise as Mimi Smith
- Henry B. Walthall as Professor Barth
- Mae Marsh as Mrs. Mary Barth
- Arline Judge as Gladys Cottle
- Frank Albertson as Pete Illings
- George Meeker as Prof. Donald Woolsey
- Frank Melton as Jim Lancaster
- Berton Churchill as Alexander Hamilton Sr.
- John Arledge as Robert Neal
- Stepin Fetchit as Bulga
