= Take It Big =

1944 film by Frank McDonald

- Theatrical release poster
- Directed by: Frank McDonald
- Screenplay by: Howard J. Green; Joe Bigelow
- Produced by: William H. Pine; William C. Thomas
- Starring: Jack Haley; Harriet Hilliard; Mary Beth Hughes; Ozzie Nelson; Arline Judge; Fritz Feld
- Cinematography: Fred Jackman Jr.
- Edited by: Victor Lewis; Howard A. Smith
- Music by: Rudy Schrager
- Production company: Pine-Thomas Productions
- Distributed by: Paramount Pictures
- Release date: June 9, 1944
- Running time: 75 minutes
- Country: United States
- Language: English

Take It Big is a 1944 American comedy film directed by Frank McDonald and written by Howard J. Green and Joe Bigelow. The film stars Jack Haley, Harriet Hilliard, Mary Beth Hughes, Richard Lane, Arline Judge and Fritz Feld. Also featured is Hilliard's husband in real life, bandleader Ozzie Nelson.

The film was released on June 9, 1944, by Paramount Pictures.

== Plot ==
She is a singer in a nightclub, but Jerry Clinton has been rejecting other jobs and other suitors because of her romantic feelings toward Jack North, who does a comic act inside a horse's costume with his partner, Eddie Hampton.

Jack inherits a dude ranch out west. When he, Jerry and Eddie arrive, they are pleased to find it a beautiful place, unaware that they have mistakenly gone to the wrong ranch. Jack acts as boss, implementing many peculiar ideas and attracting flirtation from gold digger Gaye Livingston, until real owner Harvey Phillips turns up.

Jack's actual ranch is a rundown mess. Jerry and others persuade him that it can be improved into a prosperous place just like the other, and before long Jack's ranch is attracting tourists, also drawn by Ozzie Nelson and his Orchestra being booked to entertain there. Harvey resents the competition and intends to call in an overdue loan immediately, but Jack enters a rodeo, wins first prize in the bucking bronco competition and pays off the debt.

== Cast ==
- Jack Haley as Jack North
- Harriet Hilliard as Jerry Clinton
- Mary Beth Hughes as Gaye Livingston
- Richard Lane as Eddie Hampton
- Arline Judge as Pert Martin
- Fritz Feld as Doctor Dittenhoffer
- Lucile Gleason as Sophie
- Fuzzy Knight as Cowboy Joe
- Frank Forest as Harvey Phillips
- George Meeker as John Hankinson
- Nils T. Granlund as NTG
- Ozzie Nelson as Ozzie Nelson
- Ralph Peters as House Detective
- Andy Mayo as Pansy the Dancing Horse
- Florence Mayo as Pansy the Dancing Horse

== Production ==
Pine-Thomas Productions were a unit that operated out of Paramount pictures which specialised in low budget action films. They were keen to diversify into other genres. In June 1943 Pine-Thomas signed a new contract with Paramount which included three musicals, and two bigger budgeted pictures, plus three wartime movies which would co-star Chester Morris and Russell Hayden. Jack Haley was signed to appear in two of the musicals with Mary Beth Hughes. His fee was $20,000 a film. The films were to be Rhythm Range, about an all girl rodeo, and The Duchess Rides High, about vaudeville. Rhythm Ranch became Take it Big.

Pine Thomas filmed some scenes on Clara Bow's ranch.
