= George Meeker =

American actor (1904–1984)

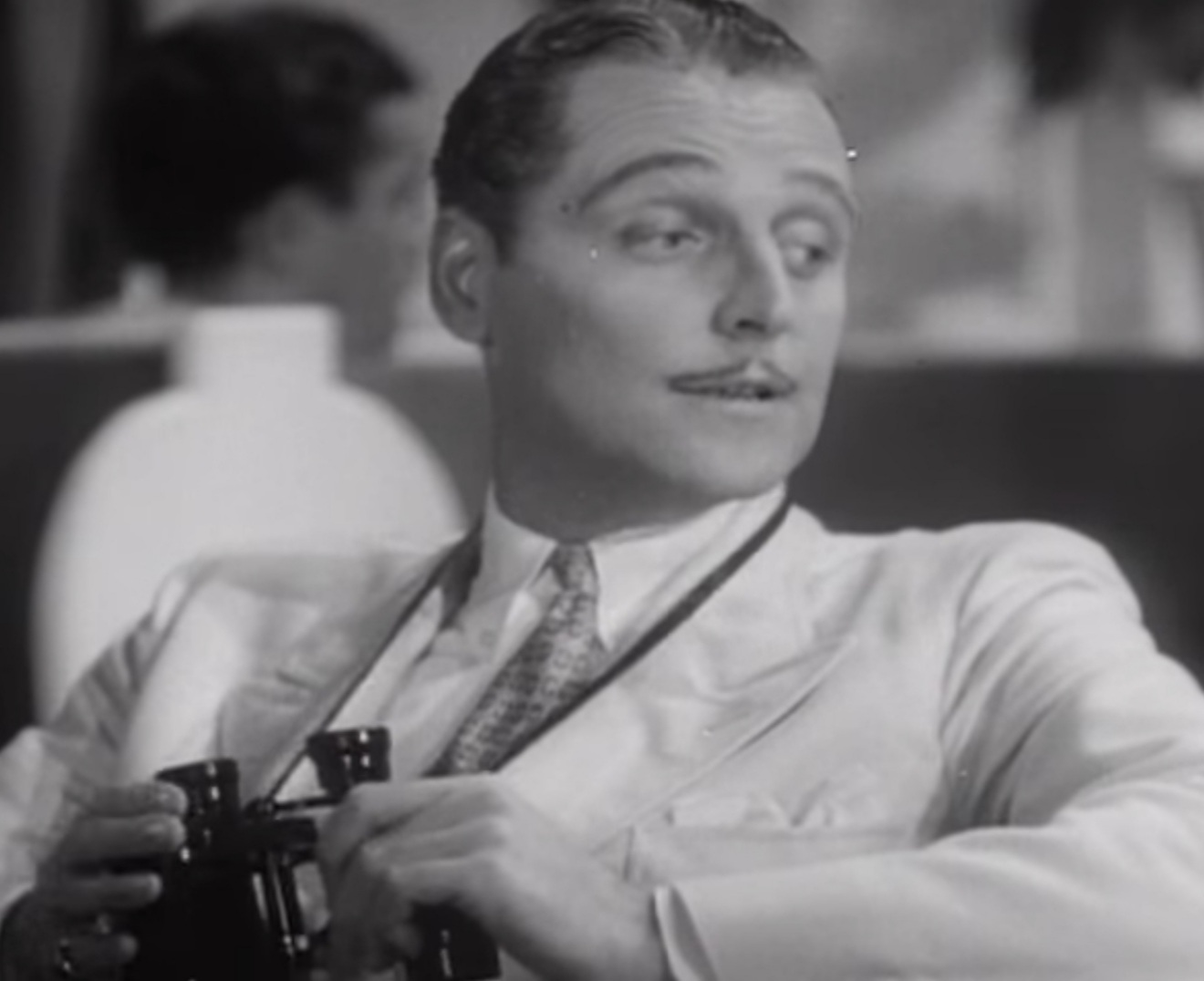
- Meeker in Tarzan's Revenge (1938)
- Born: March 5, 1904
- Died: August 19, 1984 (aged 80)
- Occupation: Actor
- Years active: 1923–1951

George Meeker (March 5, 1904 – August 19, 1984 ) was an American character film and Broadway actor.

A graduate of the American Academy of Dramatic Arts, Meeker made several films such as Crime, Inc. (1945) and A Thief in the Dark (1928), and he played an uncredited part in All Through the Night (1941).

Meeker has a star at 6101 Hollywood Boulevard in the Motion Pictures section of the Hollywood Walk of Fame.

Meeker's Broadway credits include Conflict (1929), Back Here (1928), Judy (1927), A Lady's Virtue (1925), and Judy Drops In (1924).

== Selected filmography ==
- Four Sons (1928) - Andreas - Her Son
- The Escape (1928) - Dr. Don Elliott
- A Thief in the Dark (1928) - Ernest
- Chicken a La King (1928) - Buck Taylor
- Girl-Shy Cowboy (1928) - Harry Lasser
- Strictly Dishonorable (1931) - Henry
- Emma (1932) - Bill Smith
- Fireman, Save My Child (1932) - Stevens (uncredited)
- A Fool's Advice (1932) - Harry Bayliss
- The Misleading Lady (1932) - Bob Tracy
- The Famous Ferguson Case (1932) - Jigger Bolton
- The First Year (1932) - Dick Loring
- Back Street (1932) - Kurt Shendler
- Blessed Event (1932) - Cromwell Church - the Announcer (uncredited)
- Vanity Street (1932) - Val French
- Afraid to Talk (1932) - Lenny Collins
- The Match King (1932) - Erickson (uncredited)
- Sweepings (1933) - Bert Pardway
- Pick-Up (1933) - Artie Logan (uncredited)
- Night of Terror (1933) - Prof. Arthur Hornsby
- Song of the Eagle (1933) - August Hoffmann
- The Life of Jimmy Dolan (1933) - Charles Magee
- Double Harness (1933) - Dennis Moore
- Chance at Heaven (1933) - Sid Larrick
- Only Yesterday (1933) - Dave Reynolds
- King for a Night (1933) - John Williams
- Hi, Nellie! (1934) - Sheldon
- Dark Hazard (1934) - Pres Barrow
- Hips, Hips, Hooray! (1934) - Beauchamp
- Ever Since Eve (1934) - Philip Baxter
- Melody in Spring (1934) - Wesley Prebble
- Uncertain Lady (1934) - Dr. Alexander Garrison
- I Believed in You (1934) - Saracen Jones
- Little Man, What Now? (1934) - Schultz
- Paris Interlude (1934) - Rex
- The Dragon Murder Case (1934) - Monty Montague
- The Richest Girl in the World (1934) - Donald
- Against the Law (1934) - Bert Andrews
- Broadway Bill (1934) - Henry Early
- Bachelor of Arts (1934) - Prof. Donald Woolsey
- Murder on a Honeymoon (1935) - Tom Kelsey, Alias Roswell T. Forrest
- The Wedding Night (1935) - Gilly (uncredited)
- Oil for the Lamps of China (1935) - Bill Kendall
- Don't Bet on Blondes (1935) - Minor Role (scenes deleted)
- Dante's Inferno (1935) - Drunk at Ship's Cafe (uncredited)
- Welcome Home (1935) - Edward Adams
- Manhattan Butterfly (1935)
- Murder by Television (1935) - Richard Grayson
- The Rainmakers (1935) - Orville Parker
- Remember Last Night? (1935) - Vic Huling
- If You Could Only Cook (1935) - Parker (uncredited)
- Don't Get Personal (1936) - Freddie Miller
- Tango (1936) - Foster Carver, Tony's Brother
- The Country Doctor (1936) - Dr. Wilson
- In Paris, A.W.O.L. (1936) - David
- Mr. Deeds Goes to Town (1936) - Henneberry (uncredited)
- Gentle Julia (1936) - Crum
- Neighborhood House (1936) - Adolph, Theatre Manager
- Walking on Air (1936) - Tom Quinlan
- Wedding Present (1936) - Gordon Blaker
- Career Woman (1936) - Mr. Smith
- Beware of Ladies (1936) - Freddie White
- History Is Made at Night (1937) - Mr. Norton
- The Man Who Found Himself (1937) - Howard Dennis (uncredited)
- On Again-Off Again (1937) - Tony
- Stella Dallas (1937) - Spencer Chandler (uncredited)
- Escape by Night (1937) - Fred Peters
- Music for Madame (1937) - Orchestra Leader (uncredited)
- The Westland Case (1937) - Richard Bolston
- Tarzan's Revenge (1938) - Nevin Potter
- Change of Heart (1938) - Richards (uncredited)
- Reckless Living (1938) - Man at Race Track (uncredited)
- Danger on the Air (1938) - Tuttle
- Having Wonderful Time (1938) - Subway Masher (uncredited)
- Marie Antoinette (1938) - Robespierre
- Smashing the Rackets (1938) - District Attorney Aide (uncredited)
- Slander House (1938) - Dr. Herbert Stallings
- Crime Takes a Holiday (1938) - Chuck (uncredited)
- Long Shot (1939) - Dell Baker
- Wings of the Navy (1939) - Steve Connors (uncredited)
- Rough Riders' Round-up (1939) - George Lanning
- The Lady and the Mob (1939) - George Watson
- The Kid from Texas (1939) - Henry Smith Harrington (uncredited)
- It's a Wonderful World (1939) - Ned Brown (uncredited)
- Undercover Doctor (1939) - Dapper Dan Barr
- The Jones Family in Hollywood (1939) - Movie Studio Actor (uncredited)
- Stunt Pilot (1939) - Earl Martin
- Everything's on Ice (1939) - Harrison Gregg
- The Roaring Twenties (1939) - Masters
- A Child Is Born (1939) - Mr. Harry Laverne (uncredited)
- Nick Carter, Master Detective (1939) - Hartley (uncredited)
- All Women Have Secrets (1939) - Doc
- Gone with the Wind (1939) - Poker-Playing Captain (uncredited)
- Escape to Paradise (1939) - Harry Wilson (uncredited)
- Swanee River (1939) - Henry Foster
- Free, Blonde and 21 (1940) - Drunk (uncredited)
- Sandy Is a Lady (1940) - Mr. Porter, The Writer
- Yesterday's Heroes (1940) - Tony
- A Night at Earl Carroll's (1940) - Stage Manager
- Michael Shayne, Private Detective (1940) - Harry Grange
- High Sierra (1941) - Pfiffer
- The Singing Hill (1941) - John R. Ramsey
- Affectionately Yours (1941) - Anita's Escort (uncredited)
- Love Crazy (1941) - DeWest
- Mountain Moonlight (1941) - Long
- Hurricane Smith (1941) - Joan's Boss (uncredited)
- Dive Bomber (1941) - Tom (uncredited)
- Marry the Boss's Daughter (1941) - Snavely
- The Body Disappears (1941) - (scenes deleted)
- You're in the Army Now (1941) - Captain Austin
- All Through the Night (1942) - Reporter (uncredited)
- Captains of the Clouds (1942) - Playboy
- The Male Animal (1942) - Reporter on Porch (uncredited)
- Murder in the Big House (1942) - 'Scoop' Conner
- Larceny, Inc. (1942) - Mr. Jackson
- Yankee Doodle Dandy (1942) - Hotel Clerk #1 (uncredited)
- Spy Ship (1942) - Paul
- Wings for the Eagle (1942) - Personnel Man
- The Gay Sisters (1942) - Dick's Boss (uncredited)
- Secret Enemies (1942) - Rudolph Dietz - Desk clerk
- Busses Roar (1942) - Nick Stoddard
- You Can't Escape Forever (1942) - Cummings - Greer's Lawyer (uncredited)
- Casablanca (1942) - Rick's friend (uncredited)
- The Ox-Bow Incident (1943) - Mr. Swanson (uncredited)
- Son of Dracula (1943) - Party Guest (uncredited)
- Up in Arms (1944) - Ashley's Aide
- Take It Big (1944) - John Hankinson
- Silent Partner (1944) - R.S. Treavor, Desk Clerk
- Seven Doors to Death (1944) - Charles Eaton
- Song of Nevada (1944) - Chris Calahan
- The Port of 40 Thieves (1944) - Frederick St. Clair
- Marriage Is a Private Affair (1944) - Jonesy (uncredited)
- Bowery to Broadway (1944) - Harvey's Man (uncredited)
- I Accuse My Parents (1944) - Charles Blake
- Dead Man's Eyes (1944) - Nick Phillips
- The Big Show-Off (1945) - Wally Porter
- Eadie Was a Lady (1945) - Caleb Van Horn VIII (uncredited)
- Brenda Starr, Reporter (1945, Serial) - Frank Smith (uncredited)
- Docks of New York (1945) - Prince Egor Mallet
- A Guy, a Gal and a Pal (1945) - Granville Breckenridge
- Crime, Inc. (1945) - Barry North
- Blonde Ransom (1945) - Forbes
- Mr. Muggs Rides Again (1945) - Dollar Davis
- Crime Doctor's Warning (1945) - Mrs. Lake's Attorney #1 (uncredited)
- Come Out Fighting (1945) - Silk Henley
- Northwest Trail (1945) - Whitey Yeager
- Black Market Babies (1945) - Anthony Marsden
- The Red Dragon (1945) - Edmond Slade
- Just Before Dawn (1946) - Walter Foster (uncredited)
- Murder Is My Business (1946) - Carl Meldrum
- The People's Choice (1946) - Elmer Blodgett
- Chick Carter, Detective (1946) - Nick Pollo
- Below the Deadline (1946) - Jeffrey Hilton
- Angel on My Shoulder (1946) - Mr. Bentley (uncredited)
- Her Sister's Secret (1946) - Guy
- Home in Oklahoma (1946) - Steve McClory
- Apache Rose (1947) - Reed Calhoun
- Smash-Up, the Story of a Woman (1947) - Wolf, an Attorney (uncredited)
- Road to Rio (1947) - Sherman Mallory
- The Gay Ranchero (1948) - Vance Brados
- King of the Gamblers (1948) - Bernie Dupal
- The Dude Goes West (1948) - Gambler (uncredited)
- Superman (1948, Serial) - Driller
- Silver Trails (1948) - Will Jackson
- One Touch of Venus (1948) - Mr. Crust (uncredited)
- The Denver Kid (1948) - Dealer Andre
- Words and Music (1948) - Producer (uncredited)
- The Crime Doctor's Diary (1949) - Carl Anson (uncredited)
- Omoo-Omoo, the Shark God (1949) - Dr. Godfrey Long
- Sky Liner (1949) - Financier
- Ranger of Cherokee Strip (1949) - Eric Parsons
- The Invisible Monster (1950) - Harry Long
- Twilight in the Sierras (1950) - Matt Brunner
- Spoilers of the Plains (1951) - Scientist Jim
- Wells Fargo Gunmaster (1951) - Roulette Croupier
- Government Agents vs. Phantom Legion (1951) - Willard
- Honeychile (1951) - Gambler (uncredited)
