= Bombers B-52 =

1957 film by Gordon Douglas

- Theatrical release poster
- Directed by: Gordon Douglas
- Written by: Irving Wallace
- Story by: Sam Rolfe
- Produced by: Richard Whorf
- Starring: Natalie Wood; Karl Malden; Marsha Hunt; Efrem Zimbalist Jr.
- Cinematography: William H. Clothier
- Edited by: Thomas Reilly
- Music by: Leonard Rosenman
- Production company: Warner Bros. Pictures
- Distributed by: Warner Bros. Pictures
- Release date: November 22, 1957
- Running time: 106 minutes
- Country: United States
- Language: English
- Budget: $1.8 million

Bombers B-52 (released in the UK as No Sleep till Dawn) is a 1957 American drama film produced by Richard Whorf and directed by Gordon Douglas. The film stars Natalie Wood and Karl Malden, and co-stars Marsha Hunt and Efrem Zimbalist Jr. It was adapted from a Sam Rolfe story by screenwriter Irving Wallace. Leonard Rosenman composed the score.

The film's storyline is focused on the introduction of the Boeing B-52 Stratofortress bomber by the U.S. Strategic Air Command (SAC) in the 1950s. A respected and highly experienced master sergeant must choose between continuing his career in the Air Force and accepting a job in the private sector that would pay him three times his military salary.

== Plot ==
The Strategic Air Command is about to introduce the B-52 Stratofortress bomber as its primary crewed strategic weapon. Stationed at Castle Air Force Base, California, with the 329th Bomb Squadron, 20-year United States Air Force (USAF) veteran MSgt. Chuck Brennan dislikes his commanding officer, the "hotshot" Lt. Col. Jim Herlihy. Brennan has not trusted Herlihy since an incident in the Korean War. This career-long problem interferes with flight operations and aircraft support. When Herlihy starts dating Brennan's daughter Lois, tensions grow. Brennan demands his daughter break off the relationship.

Brennan, Herlihy, and others try to solve all the technical problems that plague the introduction of the B-52. On one test flight going round the base, the fore landing gear jams due to a hydraulic fault, resulting in one of the crew having to go into the landing gear bay to try to repair the fault. An attempt to use a KC-97 Stratotanker to provide more fuel to buy the plane more time backfires when the door covering the aerial fuel intake jams as well. Fortunately, the fault is repaired just before the bomber exhausts the last of its fuel. On a top-secret test flight to Africa, after being refueled in mid-air, a control panel short-circuits, causing a fire. Herlihy orders everyone to bail out and ejects Brennan when he refuses to leave the bomber. After safely landing the burning aircraft at Castle AFB, Herlihy sends out search parties, who manage to recover all of the crew except for Brennan. Following a hunch, Herlihy eventually finds his chief aircraft mechanic, who is severely injured, and airlifts him by helicopter from remote back country to the base hospital.

While recovering, Brennan realizes that he was wrong about Herlihy, who risked his life to bring him home. He accepts that his daughter and his commanding officer should now reunite. Eventually, Brennan also has to choose between a high-paying civilian job and his US Air Force career. When told that his discharge papers are ready to sign, he decides to continue the career he loves in the USAF.

== Cast ==
- Natalie Wood as Lois Brennan
- Karl Malden as MSgt. Chuck V. Brennan
- Marsha Hunt as Edith Brennan
- Efrem Zimbalist Jr. as Lt. Col. Jim Herlihy
- Don Kelly as MSgt. Darren McKine
- Nelson Leigh as Brig. Gen. Wayne Acton
- Robert Nichols as Wilbur "Brooklyn" Stuart
- Ray Montgomery as Barnes
- Robert Hover as Simpson (as Bob Hover)
- Juanita Moore as Clarissa
- Jean Howell as Betty McKine (uncredited)

== Production ==
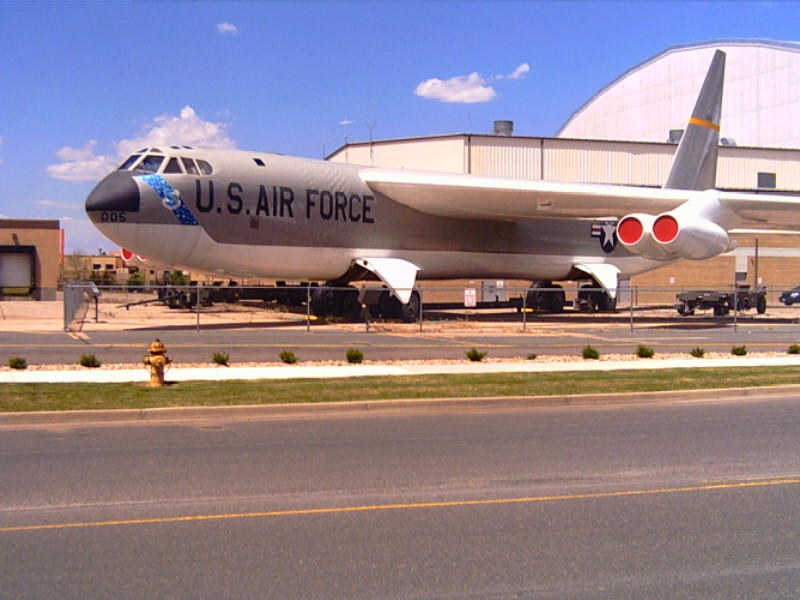
An early-series B-52B bomber

Bombers B-52 was filmed with the full cooperation of the United States Air Force at Castle and March Air Force Bases in California, where examples of Boeing B-47 Stratojet bombers, North American F-86 Sabre fighters, and B-52s were based. During production, Natalie Wood was named "Sweetheart of Castle Air Force Base".

The first choice for the starring role was Tab Hunter, who subsequently turned it down because he was tired of playing military roles. Writer Irving Wallace wrote a "racy" screenplay; one of the working titles was No Sleep till Dawn (which was used as the title for the film's UK release). The screenplay was later the subject of a 1980s exposé of sexual innuendo by film historian Hal Erickson.

== Reception ==
Reviews of Bombers B-52 mainly focused on the aerial scenes, which during the Cold War era projected a near-propaganda effort, using many period aircraft to depict the era faithfully. The review in The New York Times was mildly laudatory, describing it as a "frank tribute to Air Force nuclear power, laced together with a familiar service feud ... Irving Wallace's dialogue is excellent. Furthermore, his unpretentious scenario is credible and persuasive in training sequences and especially in the hearth scenes". The performances of the leads was also considered "natural". Overall, The New York Times critic thought "'Bombers B-52' is not [terrific], but it could have been much, much worse". Variety gushed that it was "magnificently mounted, with breathtaking scenes of the new B-52s", while Time magazine more aptly characterized Bombers B-52 as a "$1,400,000 want ad for Air Force technicians". In other reviews, the dichotomy of 19-year-old Natalie Wood being courted by 40-year-old Efrem Zimbalist Jr. was noted, as well as the attempt to portray a contemporary, if tepid, love story.

== Comic book adaptation ==
- Dell Four Color #831 (September 1957)

== See also ==
- List of American films of 1957
