= Technicolor Paradise: Rhum Rhapsodies & Other Exotic Delights =

Compilation album by Various artists
- Released: May 25, 2018
- Genre: Exotica
- Length: 137:31
- Label: The Numero Group
- Producers: Ken Shipley & Rob Sevier
- Compilers: Ken Shipley & Daniel Shiman

Technicolor Paradise: Rhum Rhapsodies & Other Exotic Delights is a 2018 compilation album of exotica music released by music label The Numero Group.

== Production ==
Technicolor Paradise: Rhum Rhapsodies & Other Exotic Delights was described by Gary Graff of Billboard as a compilation of exotica music from the 1950s and early 1960s. The compilation focuses on the more unheard of musicians of the genre opposed to its more well known musicians like Esquivel or Les Baxter. Ken Shipley of The Numero Group stated that while previous compilations of exotica music from the 1990s such as Ultra-Lounge were focused on the major labels, his idea was to develop them from the more independent music scene of the genre.

Shipley's interest in creating this compilation was after discovering the website The Exotica Project, where he noted that "Not everything on there is good, but it manages to capture a moment and show there's a moment underneath the movement." Shipley compiled nearly 700 songs for the compilation and narrowed down the choices based on personal taste and licensing availability. The compilation is split into three discs: Daiquiri Dirges, Rhum Rhapsodies and Mai Tai Mambos. The first section focuses on guitar instrumentals, the second on vocal tracks and the third takes features more dance-oriented and jazz-influenced music.

== Release ==
Technicolor Paradise: Rhum Rhapsodies & Other Exotic Delights was released by The Numero Group on compact disc and vinyl on May 25, 2018. The album contains 54 songs on the compact disc version and 48 on vinyl.

== Reception ==
Professional ratings
Review scores
Source	Rating
All About Jazz	4/5 stars
AllMusic	4/5 stars

All About Jazz's gave the album a four out of five star rating, noting that the album "shows the diversity of the genre" and that it was "an expertly compiled compendium of cool musical kitsch that is worth diving into." Stephen Thomas Erlewine of AllMusic gave the album four stars, declaring that the compilation served as "supporting evidence that the exotica craze was really as vast as it seemed on any number of '90s lounge reissues. Just as importantly, this music is every bit as frothy and fun as the music made by the well-known names of exotica, and that's the reason why any hep cat or kitten should get this set."

== Track listing ==
Daiquiri Dirges

1. Chuck (Big Guitar) Ernest - Blue Oasis
2. The Sound Breakers - "Marooned"
3. The Wailers - "Driftwood
4. Lenny and the Thundertones - "The Moon of Manakoora"
5. Biscaynes With Co-Encidentals - "Midnight in Montevideo"
6. Red Harrison & His Zodiacs - "Chant of the Jungle"
7. The Palatons - "Jungle Guitar"
8. The Chayns - "Live With the Moon"
9. Bailey's Nervous Kats - "Cobra"
10. The Blazers - "Sound of Mecca"
11. The Crew - "Jaguar Hunt"
12. The Gems - "Slave Girl"
13. Jerry & The Catalinas - "The Arabian Knight"
14. The Jaguars - "Night Walker"
15. The Voodoos - "The Voodoo Walk"
16. The Shelltones - "Blue Castaway"
17. The Blue Bells - "Atlantis"
18. Bill & Jean Bradway - "Paradise Isle"

Rhum Rhapsodies

1. The Melody Mates - "Enchantment"
2. Don Reed - "Nature Boy"
3. The Baton of Andre Brummer - "Tumba"
4. Darla Hood - "Silent Island"
5. Martha Raye With Phil Moore Orchestra - "Lotus Land"
6. Baha'i Victory Chorus - "Nightengale of Paradise"
7. Carmen - "Isle of Love"
8. The Monzas - "Forever Walks a Drifter"
9. Akim - "Voodoo Drums"
10. Fred Darian With Bill Loose Orchestra - "Magic Voodoo Moon"
11. Don Sargent and the Buddies - "Voodoo Kiss"
12. Joan Joyce Trio - "Captured"
13. Pony Sherrell - "Tobago"
14. Darla Hood - "My Quiet Village"
15. Jerry Warren & the Valids - "Enchantress"
16. The Centuries - "Polynesian Paradise"
17. The Potted Palm - "My House of Grass"
18. The Castiles - "Enchantment"

Mai Tai Mambos

1. Five Glow Tones - "Quiet Village"
2. Modesto Duran & Orchestra - "Silent Island"
3. Ross Anderson Chorus & Orchestra - "Tam-bu Theme"
4. Bobby Christian - "Caravan"
5. Bruce Norman Quintet - "Arabian Rhythm"
6. The Slaves - "Hart's Harem"
7. Arnie and Chise - "Similau"
8. Three Bars Featuring Nicky Roberts - "Caribbean Cruise"
9. Robert Drasnin - "Chant of the Moon"
10. Blue Jeans - "Moon Mist"
11. Artie Barsamian - "The Enchanting Melody"
12. Eddie Kochak & Hakki Obadia - "Jazz in Port Said"
13. Gene Sikora & The Irrationals - "Tanganyika"
14. Bobby Paris - "Dark Continent"
15. Walter Bolen - "Lion Hunt"
16. Jimmy McGriff - "Jungle Cat"
17. Chico Jose - "Locura (Madness)"
18. Clyde Derby - "Lost Island"
