= Welcome Home (1935 film) =

1935 film by James Tinling

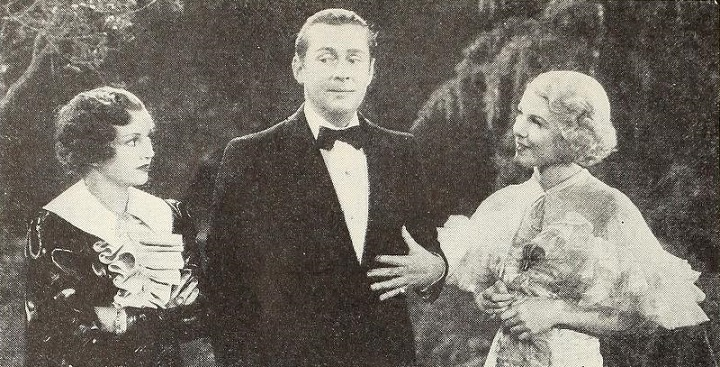
- (L. to r.) Arline Judge, James Dunn, and Rosina Lawrence in the film
- Directed by: James Tinling
- Screenplay by: Marion Orth; Paul Gerard Smith
- Story by: Arthur T. Horman
- Produced by: Buddy G. DeSylva
- Starring: James Dunn; Arline Judge; Raymond Walburn; Rosina Lawrence; William Frawley; Charles Sellon
- Cinematography: Arthur C. Miller
- Production company: Fox Film Corporation
- Distributed by: 20th Century-Fox Film Corporation
- Release date: August 9, 1935
- Running time: 73 minutes
- Country: United States
- Language: English

Welcome Home is a 1935 American comedy film directed by James Tinling and starring James Dunn, Arline Judge, Raymond Walburn, Rosina Lawrence, William Frawley and Charles Sellon. Written by Marion Orth and Paul Gerard Smith, the film was released on August 9, 1935, by 20th Century-Fox Film Corporation.

== Plot ==
Elmdale's chamber of commerce is all but broke. A decision is made to spend what remains of the budget on a reunion that hopefully will entice one of America's wealthiest men, Andrew Anstruther, to return to the place of his birth and build a new factory there.

A team of con artists, who have previously robbed the town of $10,000 through a bogus bond trick, learns of the plan. The team consists of leader Richard "Dickie" Fosters, Dickie's girlfriend known only as "Gorgeous", fake bonds salesman "Giltedge", and gold-tooth-stealing fake dentist "Painless".

Anstruther takes a liking to Dickie, but Giltedge swindles the millionaire out of $36,000 for worthless bonds. Dickie bets on a horse for Susan's sake to win the money back, but the horse loses. The crooks are charged with murder after Anstruther vanishes, but he turns up just in time to vouch for Dickie as a friend. After he learns Susan has a boyfriend, Dickie goes back to the arms of Gorgeous, who tells him, "Welcome home."

== Cast ==
- James Dunn as Richard Foster
- Arline Judge as Gorgeous
- Raymond Walburn as Giltedge
- Rosina Lawrence as Susan Adams
- William Frawley as Painless
- Charles Sellon as Andrew Anstruther
- Charles Ray as Andrew Carr
- Frank Melton as Willis Parker
- George Meeker as Edward Adams
- James Burke as Michael Shaughnessy
- Arthur Hoyt as Titwillow
- Dave O'Brien as Stanley Phillips
- Spencer Charters as Constable Mulhausen
- Harry Holman as Flink
- Sarah Edwards as Mrs. Edwards
