= Three Smart Boys =

- Directed by: Gordon Douglas
- Produced by: Hal Roach
- Starring: George McFarland; Carl Switzer; Billie Thomas; Eugene Lee; Darla Hood; Darwood Kaye; Shirley Coates; Rosina Lawrence; Sidney Bracey; Nora Cecil; Jack Egan; George the Monk
- Cinematography: Art Lloyd
- Edited by: William H. Ziegler
- Music by: Leroy Shield; Marvin Hatley
- Distributed by: Metro-Goldwyn-Mayer
- Release date: May 13, 1937
- Running time: 10:35
- Country: United States
- Language: English

Three Smart Boys is a 1937 Our Gang short comedy film directed by Gordon Douglas. It was the 153rd Our Gang short to be released.

== Plot ==
The boys are anxious to get out of school. They overhear the superintendent of the area's schools talking with Miss Lawrence, who wants to close the school for a week to attend a sister's wedding. She is denied, stating that only an epidemic would justify closing school. Spanky then decides to stage a phony epidemic with Alfalfa and Buckwheat. This time, it is the measles, requiring the boys to paint blotches on their faces. The plan comes apart when, while visiting the doctor (Sidney Bracey), the boys are led to believe that Buckwheat has been transformed into a monkey. They then find out that the superintendent changed her mind and decided to let Miss Lawrence to attend the wedding after all and the school would be closed.

== Cast ==
=== The Gang ===
- Eugene Lee as Porky
- George McFarland as Spanky
- Carl Switzer as Alfalfa
- Billie Thomas as Buckwheat
- Darwood Kaye as Waldo

=== Additional cast ===
- Sidney Bracey as O.T. Hertz, the veterinary doctor
- Nora Cecil as Miss Witherspoon, Superintendent
- Jack Egan as The assistant
- Rosina Lawrence as Miss Lawrence, Teacher
- Darla Hood as Darla

== Production notes ==
Three Smart Boys marked the eighth and final appearance of Rosina Lawrence as teacher "Miss Jones." The film was marginally edited due to perceived racism toward African Americans on the syndicated Little Rascals television package in 1971.

== See also ==
- Our Gang filmography
