= Aladdin's Lantern =

- Directed by: Gordon Douglas
- Written by: Hal Law; Robert A. McGowan
- Produced by: Jack Chertok for MGM
- Cinematography: Robert Pittack
- Music by: David Snell
- Distributed by: MGM
- Release date: September 17, 1938
- Running time: 10:04
- Country: United States
- Language: English

Aladdin's Lantern is a 1938 Our Gang short comedy film directed by Gordon Douglas. It was the 171st Our Gang short to be released.

== Plot ==
The gang members are putting on a musical show about Aladdin and his lamp. While Spanky, Alfalfa and Darla endeavor to stick to the script (such as it is), their efforts are undermined by smaller kids Buckwheat and Porky. The ending finds Alfalfa getting his just deserts as his bottom gets set on fire in front of the audience. They roar in laughter as his seat cooks to a medium rare and his face turns bright red in embarrassment. As the show fades to black Alfalfa is happily cooling his blistered backside in a washing machine filled with cold water while the water boils from the heat and steam rises around him.

== Cast ==
=== The Gang ===
- Darla Hood as Darla
- Eugene Lee as Porky
- George McFarland as Spanky / Caliph
- Carl Switzer as Alfalfa / Aladdin
- Billie Thomas as Buckwheat
- Gary Jasgar as Gary
- Darwood Kaye as Waldo
- Leonard Landy as Deacon
- Joe "Corky" Geil as Tap dancing boy
- Billy Minderhout as Genie
- George the Monkey as Elmer

=== Dancers and audience extras ===
Gloria Brown, Bobby Callahan, Dix Davis, Tim Davis, Rae-Nell Laskey, Henry Lee, Peggy Lynch, Priscilla Montgomery, Harold Switzer, Marylyn Astor Thorpe, Laura June Williams

== Notes ==
Aladdin's Lantern was the last episode directed by Gordon Douglas. It was also the first MGM entry produced with George McFarland as Spanky. He returned from loan to other studios. Gordon Douglas left the gang and MGM to return to Hal Roach Studios.

== See also ==
- Our Gang filmography
