= Charlie Chan's Secret =

1936 film by Gordon Wiles

- Directed by: Gordon Wiles
- Written by: Robert Ellis; Helen Logan; Joseph Hoffman
- Based on: Charlie Chan by Earl Derr Biggers
- Produced by: John Stone; Sol M. Wurtzel
- Starring: Warner Oland; Henrietta Crosman; Rosina Lawrence
- Cinematography: Rudolph Maté
- Edited by: Nick DeMaggio
- Music by: Samuel Kaylin
- Production company: 20th Century Fox
- Distributed by: 20th Century Fox
- Release date: January 10, 1936
- Running time: 72 minutes
- Country: United States

Charlie Chan's Secret

Charlie Chan's Secret is a 1936 American mystery film directed by Gordon Wiles and starring Warner Oland, Henrietta Crosman and Rosina Lawrence. It is the tenth film in Fox's Charlie Chan series featuring Oland as the detective.

== Plot ==
Charlie Chan has been investigating the whereabouts of Allen Colby, heir to a vast fortune. He recently made contact with his relations in San Francisco: his Aunt Henrietta Colby Lowell, her daughters Alice and Janice, and Janice's husband, Fred. The story opens as Allen is traced to a ship that has sunk, but it cannot be confirmed that he is dead. On the contrary, evidence is found that someone is trying to kill him to prevent his return to San Francisco to claim the estate.

Allen arrives at Colby House and is promptly murdered. His body is revealed in the course of a seance conducted that evening at Colby House with Chan in attendance. He is an old friend of Mrs Lowell; who, like her late brother, is a devout believer in psychic research. She has retained the services of Professor Bowen and his wife, Carlotta, who is a medium. Someone subsequently attempts to kill Mrs Lowell and eventually appears to succeed. The truth is revealed in another seance, at which the murderer makes a foolish mistake.

== Cast ==
- Warner Oland as Charlie Chan, famous Chinese-American detective from Honolulu
- Jerry Miley as Allen Colby, the murdered heir, son of Bernard Colby and nephew of Henrietta Colby Lowell
- Henrietta Crosman as Mrs Lowell, Allen's aunt, who is currently administering her late brother's fortune as she awaits his son's return
- Rosina Lawrence as Alice Lowell, one of Henrietta Lowell's daughters, engaged to Dick Williams, lives at Lowell House with her mother
- Charles Quigley as Dick Williams, Alice's fiancé, a newspaper reporter, always on the lookout for a big story
- Astrid Allwyn as Janice Lowell Gage, Mrs Lowell's other daughter; she thinks her mother should be entitled to something from her late uncle's estate, regardless of Allen's claims
- Edward Trevor as Fred Gage, Henrietta's son-in-law, married to Janice; he is the accountant for the estate and knows the layout of Colby House
- Herbert Mundin as Mrs Lowell's butler, Baxter, who despite the butler stereotype decidedly did not do it; he provides comic relief throughout the film
- Jonathan Hale as Warren Phelps, Mrs Lowell's attorney and executor of Bernard Colby's estate; he recently suffered serious losses on the stock market, and will be out of a job if Allen returns
- Egon Brecher as Ulrich, the caretaker at Colby House; he has a grudge against Allen for jilting his daughter, who subsequently committed suicide
- Arthur Edmund Carewe as Prof. Bowen, Mrs Lowell's advisor psychic researcher; he apparently knows of Allen Colby's death, but it is not explained how
- Gloria Roy as Carlotta, Prof. Bowen's wife; she is a genuine medium although Bowen is somewhat fraudulent; but both will no longer be employed by Mrs Lowell if Allen returns
- Ivan Miller as Detective Inspector Morton of the San Francisco Police, in charge of the case
- William Bailey as Detective Harris
- Bud Geary, Chuck Hamilton and Brick Sullivan as SFPD officers
- James T. Mack as the forensic officer dusting for fingerprints
- Landers Stevens as the pathologist who examines Allen Colby's body at the scene
- Francis Ford as the captain of a ship salvaging the remains of the S.S. Nestor, on which Allen Colby was travelling when it sank

== Critical reception ==
A review of the film by B. R. Crisler in The New York Times described it as having "nothing in it (including Warner Oland) to surprise or disappoint the Chan addict," that the "mystery in itself is an almost exclusively mechanical affair," that it contains "the familiar circumstance that only Chan and the comic relief are definitely above suspicion," and that "the killer is unmasked in one of those inevitable drawing-room finales."

Variety wrote that this was "easily the best" of the recent "Chan" films and that it should "more than please the Chan clientele and get satisfactory box office returns." Their review highlighted the performances of two members of the cast with the comment, "Warner Oland turns in his customary skilful interpretation of the shrewd detective …. (and the) whole film is strengthened by grand trouping job by Henrietta Crosman."

Gus McCarthy writing for Motion Picture Herald felt that this entry in the series, marked a change in tone and wrote that the film is "vividly different from its immediate predecessors. While it retains all in the way of comedy, drama, the atmosphere of personal adventure and danger, suspense and the light romantic love interest contrast with which patrons have become familiar, the main feature is weird mystery."

The Film Daily wrote that "the consistent quality" of the Charlie Chan series was "due in a large measure to the fine work of Warner Oland" in the title role, and that this "intriguing mystery" was "up to the usual standard" and would be sure to please the fans of the series.

The Hong Kong Daily Press reported that "the master Chinese detective goes about solving the weirdest mystery in his own and unassuming way," and that "Oland as Charlie Chan gives yet another excellent portrayal."

== Production copyright ==
The film is the public domain due to the omission of a valid copyright notice on original prints.

== See also ==
- List of films in the public domain in the United States
