= Dan Topping =

American owner of professional sports teams

- Born: Daniel Reid Topping; June 11, 1912; Greenwich, Connecticut, U.S.
- Died: May 18, 1974 (aged 61); Miami Beach, Florida, U.S.
- Resting place: Woodlawn Cemetery
- Education: Hun School of Princeton, University of Pennsylvania
- Occupations: Owner of the Brooklyn Dodgers (NFL) (1934–1945); Co-owner of the New York Yankees (1945–1964); President of the New York Yankees (1948–1966)
- Spouses: Theodora Boettger (m. 1932; div. 1935) Arline Judge (m. 1937; div. 1940) Sonja Henie (m. 1940; div. 1946) Kay Sutton (m. 1946; div. 1952) Alice Lowthers (m. 1954; div. 1958) Charlotte Lillard (m. 1957)
- Children: 9, including Dan Jr.
- Baseball career

Career highlights and awards
- 10× World Series champions (1947, 1949, 1950, 1951, 1952, 1953, 1956, 1958, 1961, 1962)

Daniel Reid Topping (June 11, 1912 – May 18, 1974) was an American sports executive who was part owner and president of the New York Yankees baseball team from 1945 to 1964. During Topping's tenure as chief executive of the Yankees, the team won 14 American League pennants and ten World Series championships.

== Early life and career ==
Topping was born on June 11, 1912, in Greenwich, Connecticut, to Rhea (Reid) and Henry Junkins Topping. Henry Junkins Topping was the son of John A. Topping, an industrialist and president of Republic Iron and Steel. His mother Rhea was the daughter of Daniel G. Reid, who was known as the "Tinplate King" for his vast wealth in the tin industry. Daniel Topping inherited a portion of both fortunes. Topping had two brothers: Henry J. Topping (1914–1968), and John Reid Topping (1921–1969).

Topping attended the Hun School and the University of Pennsylvania, and excelled in multiple sports. He was an excellent golfer, qualifying for the United States Amateur Championships three times. He worked in banking for a few years, opened and closed a small advertising agency, then purchased a partial interest in the Brooklyn Dodgers of the National Football League in 1931. He became the majority owner of the club and improved the team, but the onset of World War II caused several players to join the military. Topping himself joined the Marines and served in the Pacific Theater for the majority of his tenure in the Corps. He left the Marine Corps as a major and later became a colonel in the Ready Reserve.

== New York Yankees owner ==
During the war, while serving in California, Topping ran into Larry MacPhail. MacPhail, then the president of the Brooklyn Dodgers baseball team, and Topping were acquainted because both Dodgers athletic teams (baseball and football) played at Ebbets Field. In California, MacPhail told Topping of his interest in purchasing the New York Yankees. MacPhail invited Topping to join the syndicate attempting to purchase the team from the estate of Jacob Ruppert. Along with Del Webb, the group purchased a 96.88% interest in the Yankees for $2.8 million in January 1945. In March, they bought the remaining 3.12%, giving them complete control of the team. MacPhail was named team president, while Topping and Webb were named vice presidents.

Topping as owner of the New York Yankees of the AAFC in 1946

As a new Yankee owner, Topping wanted to move the Dodgers football team into Yankee Stadium. Tim Mara, owner of the New York Giants, who played in the Polo Grounds, held NFL territorial rights, and refused to permit this. During 1945, Topping's Brooklyn Tigers were merged with the Boston Yanks and the amalgam split its home games between Boston and Brooklyn as "The Yanks". Topping moved his team to Yankee Stadium anyway, joining the newly formed All-America Football Conference. Topping's team retained none of his players during the jump, in that the NFL ruled that the Yanks players remained under contract with Boston, but he was able to sign some of his former Brooklyn Dodger players to the football New York Yankees. The team was not one of the AAFC teams admitted to the NFL in 1950, and folded, with most of Topping's players going to Ted Collins's New York Yanks.

MacPhail became increasingly erratic and maniacal. After a drunken episode at the Biltmore at a Yankees 1947 World Series celebration dinner, MacPhail sold his share of the team to Topping and Webb for $2 million. Topping and Webb became co-owners of the Yankees, each with a 50% share. Webb became active in American League affairs, while Topping directed team operations.

The two sold an 80% interest in the team to CBS in November 1964 for $11.2 million; Webb and Topping each retained a ten percent share of the club. Webb sold his interest four months later in 1965. Topping remained as team president until September 19, 1966, when he sold his remaining stake in the Yankees.

== Personal life ==
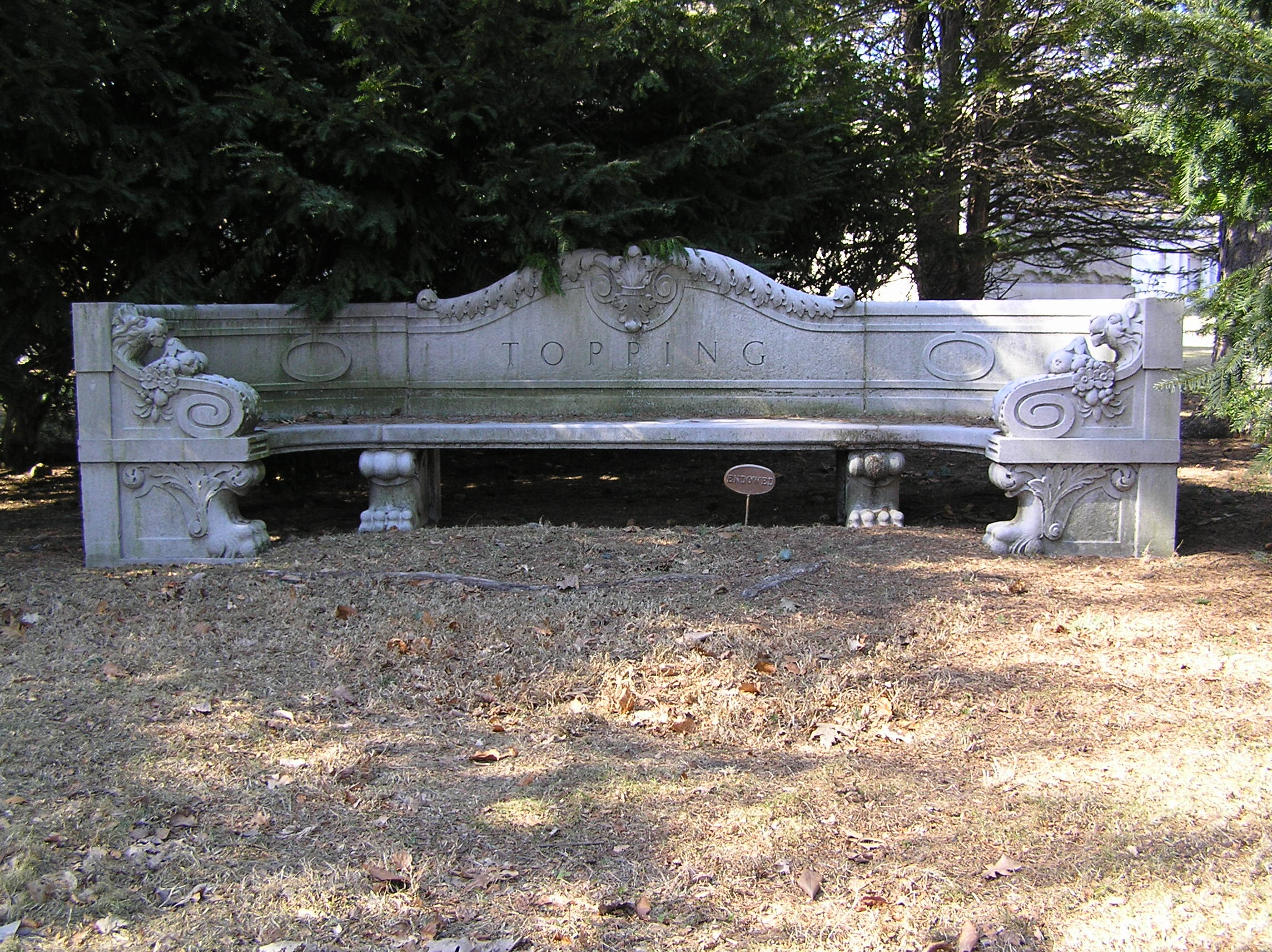
The exedra tombstone of Dan Topping in Woodlawn Cemetery

Topping was married six times, five of which ended in divorce. He married heiress Theodora Boettger in 1932. They were divorced in 1935. His second marriage was to actress Arline Judge in 1937. They divorced in 1940, and Judge went on to marry his brother Henry. Dan Topping was then married to three-time Olympic figure skating gold medalist Sonja Henie from 1940 to 1946. His fourth marriage was to actress Kay Sutton in 1946. From 1954 to 1958, Topping was married to Manhattan model Alice Lowthers. His final marriage was to Charlotte Lillard, which lasted from 1957 until his death.

Topping fathered nine children, including Dan Topping Jr.

He died of complications from emphysema in Miami Beach, Florida, on May 18, 1974, at age 61. He is buried in Woodlawn Cemetery in The Bronx, New York.

Sporting positions
Preceded by Jacob Ruppert Estate	Owner of the New York Yankees with Del Webb and Larry MacPhail 1945–1947 with Del Webb 1947–1964	Succeeded by CBS
Preceded by Larry MacPhail	New York Yankees President; 1947–1966	Succeeded by Mike Burke
