= One Hour Late =

1934 film by Ralph Murphy

- Directed by: Ralph Murphy
- Screenplay by: Kathryn Scola; Paul Gerard Smith
- Story by: Libbie Block
- Produced by: Albert Lewis
- Starring: Joe Morrison; Helen Twelvetrees; Conrad Nagel; Arline Judge; Ray Walker; Eddie Craven
- Cinematography: Ben F. Reynolds
- Music by: Tom Satterfield
- Production company: Paramount Pictures
- Distributed by: Paramount Pictures
- Release date: December 14, 1934
- Running time: 74 minutes
- Country: United States
- Language: English

One Hour Late is a 1934 American comedy film directed by Ralph Murphy and written by Kathryn Scola and Paul Gerard Smith. The film stars Joe Morrison, Helen Twelvetrees, Conrad Nagel, and Arline Judge. One Hour Late was released on December 14, 1934, by Paramount Pictures. The film was intended as a vehicle to help Morrison become a new Paramount star.

== Cast ==
- Joe Morrison as Eddie Blake
- Helen Twelvetrees as Bessie Dunn
- Conrad Nagel as Stephen Barclay
- Arline Judge as Hazel
- Ray Walker as Cliff Miller
- Eddie Craven as Maxie
- Toby Wing as Maizie
- Gail Patrick as Mrs. Ellen Barclay
- Edward Clark as Mr. Meller
- Ray Milland as Tony St. John
- George E. Stone as Benny
- Jed Prouty as Mr. Finch
- Arthur Hoyt as Barlow
- Charles Sellon as Simpson
