= Two Too Young =

1936 film by Gordon Douglas

- Directed by: Gordon Douglas
- Written by: Hal Law; Louis McManus; Tom Bell
- Produced by: Hal Roach
- Starring: George McFarland; Carl Switzer; Eugene Lee; Billie Thomas; Earl Colby; Rosina Lawrence
- Cinematography: Art Lloyd
- Edited by: William H. Ziegler
- Music by: Leroy Shield
- Distributed by: MGM
- Release date: September 26, 1936 (U.S.)
- Running time: 9:55
- Country: United States
- Language: English
- Budget: $18,196.78

Two Too Young is a 1936 Our Gang short comedy film directed by Gordon Douglas. Produced by Hal Roach and released to theaters by Metro-Goldwyn-Mayer, it was the 147th Our Gang short to be released.

== Plot ==
During a slow day at school, Alfalfa spends penmanship class writing a note to Spanky, informing his pal that the two "little kids", Buckwheat and Porky, have firecrackers and that Spanky should think of a way to relieve them of their possessions. Alfalfa delivers his note to Spanky via paper airplane, and as soon as recess begins the two boys stop Buckwheat and Porky at the door and offer to trade a magnifying glass and a water pistol for the firecrackers. When Buckwheat and Porky refuse their offer, Spanky and Alfalfa sneak into the janitor's office and borrow his clothing to disguise themselves as an adult. Spanky sits on Alfalfa's shoulders and also cuts Alfalfa's cowlick off to use as a mustache (Alfalfa, upon learning Spanky has shorn him of his trademark: "I'm ruined!").

Telling the little kids that he is a G-man, the ersatz Spanky-Alfalfa "adult" succeeds in extracting the firecrackers from Buckwheat. Spanky and Alfalfa fail to make an escape, however, without giving away their disguise. Undaunted, Spanky discards the disguise and begins attempting to light the firecrackers with his magnifying glass. Buckwheat gets even with him by sneaking into the classroom and ringing the teacher's bell, bringing recess to an early end. As everyone heads inside, Spanky has Alfalfa stuff the firecrackers in his back pocket, and Porky picks up Spanky's magnifying glass, which he had left discarded on the ground as he headed back inside.

Back in class, Miss Lawrence calls on the children to recite their recitations, but it turns out that Alfalfa is the only one willing to recite. He stands to recite "The Charge of the Light Brigade," revealing the firecrackers in his back pocket. Using the magnifying glass, Porky trains the light on Alfalfa's pocket, setting off the firecrackers so that by the time Alfalfa reaches the "Cannons to the left of me/Cannons to the right of me/Volleyed and thundered" verses of the poem, his backside is on fire. Alfalfa runs around the classroom with smoke and flames trailing him, and then outside where he puts his rear out in a washtub full of cold water. Steam comes blasting out of the water and it boils due to the heat of his seat. With his mouth hanging open and his eyes closed, he dunks his blistered rear end into the cold water over and over again. As he's awkwardly reveling in the pleasure of being extinguished, he slowly opens his eyes and turns to see his entire class and beautiful young teacher staring at him in his private moment of ecstasy. Alfalfa is totally humiliated and blushes, but keeps on dunking because it just feels too good to stop. Even as the camera pans away from him you can still hear his heated bottom dunking in the water. The entire class laughs hysterically at him as the sounds of his butt splashing continue, and the screen fades to black.

== Cast ==
=== The Gang ===
- Eugene Lee as Porky
- George McFarland as Spanky
- Carl Switzer as Alfalfa
- Billie Thomas as Buckwheat

=== Additional cast ===
- Harold Switzer as Kid bumping into 'G-man'
- Rosina Lawrence as Miss Lawrence

=== Classroom extras ===
John Collum, Rex Downing, Barbara Goodrich, Paul Hilton, Sidney Kibrick, Dickie De Nuet, Donald Proffitt, Joe Straunch Jr., Jerry Tucker

== See also ==
- Our Gang filmography
