= Sensation Hunters =

Sensation Hunters may refer to:

- Sensation Hunters (1933 film), an American film directed by Charles Vidor
- Sensation Hunters (1945 film), an American film directed by Christy Cabanne
