= Nadja Regin =

Serbian actress (1931–2019)

- Born: Nadežda Poderegin; 2 December 1931; Niš, Yugoslavia
- Died: 6 April 2019 (aged 87); London, England, UK
- Occupations: Actress, writer, publisher
- Years active: 1949–1968
- Spouse: Michael Szrajber (m. 1956; died 2009)
- Children: 1

Nadežda "Nađa" Poderegin (2 December 1931 – 6 April 2019), commonly known by her stage name Nadja Regin (Serbian Cyrillic: Нађа Регин, Nađa Regin), was a Serbian actress, writer and publisher. Performing in Yugoslav films from 1949, she developed an international career in the 1950s, appearing in the 1960s in such British television series like Danger Man, Maigret, The Benny Hill Show and The Saint.

She was one of the few actresses to have appeared in two James Bond movies: as the mistress of Kerim Bey in From Russia with Love and a smaller appearance in the pre-credit sequence of Goldfinger.

== Early life ==
Regin was born as Nadežda Poderegin (Serbian Cyrillic: Надежда Подерегин) on 2 December 1931 in Niš, Serbia, Kingdom of Yugoslavia. She was born to Milka Bajić Poderegin (1904–1971), a professor, and Ignjatije Poderegin, Russian white émigré, a professor and agricultural scientist. She also had a younger sister Jelena Poderegin, nicknamed Ljolja. Her mother was born in Pljevlja, Ottoman Empire (today in Montenegro), while her father was an ethnic Russian born in Kyiv, Russian Empire (today in Ukraine).

She grew up in Kraljevo where her father worked as a professor at the High School for Agriculture. He was executed by the German occupation forces during World War II during the Kraljevo massacre in October 1941. Though several people intervened for him to be released, he refused to abandon his colleagues and students who were to be shot by the Germans, so they shot him, too. Her mother Milka was a vocal opponent to the German occupation and was blacklisted by the Germans.

After the Soviet Red Army arrived in Yugoslavia and participated with the Yugoslav Partisans in forcing out the Germans, a 13-year-old Regin shortly acted as an interpreter in the Kraljevo hospital, as she learned Russian from her father. Soon after the liberation, Poderegin family moved to Belgrade where her mother found a new employment. According to writer, translator and diplomat Ivan Ivanji, Poderegin was arrested during the 1948 Tito–Stalin split by UDBA (Yugoslav secret police intelligence and security agency) for distributing pro-Stalin pamphlets. Ivanji further claims that she was soon released "on intervention by someone important" as "harmless". In his autobiographical book Bilo jednom u Jugoslaviji (Once Upon a Time in Yugoslavia), Ivanji states that he befriended Poderegin in early 1950s, at the time when she was unhappily in love with painter and sculptor Marinko Benzon, describing Poderegin as "one of the most beautiful girls in Belgrade".

== Education ==
She began to act as a child, participating in some children adaptations, at the age of 7. In Belgrade, Regin attended the 7th Girls Gymnasium, while both sisters went to the ballet school.

Regin originally planned to study journalism, but entered the Academy for Theatrical Arts in Belgrade in 1950. She was mentored by Joža Rutić and Branko Pleša, while among her classmates were Jelena Žigon, Dragan Laković, Dejan Čavić, Branislav Jerinić, Petar Banićević and Pavle Minčić. She graduated 20 May 1954 in the role of Anka, from the play Lovers by the unknown 16th century author, performing in the Belgrade Drama Theatre.

In this period, she was known as "the most beautiful girl in Belgrade". She also has a diploma in literature from the University of Belgrade's Faculty of Philosophy.

== Acting career ==
=== Yugoslavia ===
Regin's acting career began during her student years. She was noticed by film director Vladimir Pogačić who gave Regin her first role in his 1949 film The Factory Story, which basically acted as her post-graduate studies. In 1950, Vojislav Nanović directed her in his pastoral folk tale The Magic Sword. She again worked with Nanović in 1952 in Frosina.

In 1955, she starred in Ešalon Dr. M, a hugely successful movie directed by Žika Mitrović. A feature dealing with the World War II was Regin's last work in her home country.

=== International career ===
She originally expanded her career through several Yugoslav-German co-productions. From the 1954 production of The House on the Coast, directed by Boško Kosanović, she shortened her surname from Poderegin to Regin. It was a story of love triangle, also starring Bert Sotlar and Sybille Schmitz. She and Schmitz played a daughter and a mother who are both in love with the same man. The film was screened at the Berlin Film Festival where she was treated as a star due to the film's popularity, and this kickstarted her international career.

On the success of The House on the Coast, she was offered a multi-film contract for the German and Austrian territories. Other German-language films include Roman eines Frauenarztes (1954; by Falk Harnack), Du mein stilles Tal (1955; by Leonard Steckel) and Goodbye, Franziska (1957; by Wolfgang Liebeneiner).

In 1964, she starred in the movie Runaway, a New Zealand production which also starred young Kiri Te Kanawa. It was Regin's final film appearance.

=== UK career ===
Regin moved to London in the mid-1950s. She described the relocation as a "sort of a professional suicide" since she did not speak a word of English at the time. Still, she soon acted in British projects like the series The Adventures of William Tell, which was her television debut, and The Invisible Man, and the feature film, Don't Panic Chaps!. The movie tells a story of British and German soldiers stranded on an island, who decide to peacefully co-exist because they can't leave. However, one day a girl, played by Regin, arrives on the island and the soldiers resume fighting, this time because of her. Regin cited this movie as her personal favorite.

She appeared in many British TV series in this period: International Detective, Danger Man (where she played a Christine Keeler-sque character), Maigret, Richard the Lionheart, The Benny Hill Show, Crane, The Saint and Comedy Playhouse.She played Nadia in 'The Edgar Wallace Mystery Theatre' episode 'Number Six'(1962) She also rehearsed for the episode "Girl on the Trapeze", an early episode of the TV series The Avengers, but actress Mia Karam was cast for the eventual episode. Her last appearance was in the 1968 episode of Dixon of Dock Green, after which she retired from acting. As the main reason for quitting acting, Regin stated her wish to spend more time with her daughter. At first she rejected offers for working outside of the United Kingdom, and then scrapped the acting career altogether.

She stated that, though she learned the language well, in time her Slavic accent was an obstacle for more diverse roles: "I was condemned to accept the roles of spies and foreign girls, and you hadn't much of those. In London I forever was just like that – a foreigner".

=== Bond girl ===
Regin is among the few actresses to have appeared in two James Bond movies. In From Russia with Love (1963) she played the mistress of Kerim Bey, played by Pedro Armendariz, while in Goldfinger (1964), she played Mexican belly dancer Bonita, a smaller appearance in the pre-credit sequence. Regin herself suspected that they called her to appear in Goldfinger as a compensation for not having more scenes in From Russia with Love.

She spoke very fondly of Armendariz: "He was a real gentleman. And when we were filming scenes from the From Russia With Love, from the James Bond franchise, he [Armendariz] was severely ill, actually, he was dying. Director Terence Young was aware of what is happening to Armendariz so he decided to film all his scenes, including those with me, in only one day. Armendariz succumbed to the illness later that year, 1963". She also described Sean Connery as a great professional.

Regin kept private about her franchise work and gave only a few interviews. Movie Memories magazine interviewed her in 2015 about her Bond roles. In 2018, though 87-years old, she participated in some of the happenings regarding the "Year of James Bond" in the United Kingdom, as part of the 55th anniversary of the first James Bond novel, Casino Royale.

Of successor Bond Girls, she especially praised Bérénice Marlohe from Skyfall, and generally described it as a "very powerful film", despite being nostalgic for the older entries in the franchise.

== Literary career ==
In the 1970s, her work included reading and selecting film scripts for production by film companies including Rank Films and Hammer Films. In 1980, she and her sister Jelena formed Honeyglen Publishing Ltd, a small publishing company, specializing in philosophy and art history, belles-lettres, biography, and some fiction. She published her mother's only novel, The Dawning (Svitanje in Serbian), in 1978. Regin compiled the last quarter of her mother's book from her notes, as her mother died before finishing it. Regin also personally translated the book in English and published it in 1988. The book was later also translated into French.

Nadja authored several works herself. Her novel, The Victims and the Fools, was published as an e-book under her full name Nadja Poderegin. She also wrote a children's story, The Puppet Planet, and in the years prior to her death, she worked on her memoirs, titled Recollections.

== Personal life ==
In Cannes, Regin met Michael Szrajber (1922–2009), a Polish-born British World War II parachute airman turned industrialist. Szrajber was a member of the 1st Independent Parachute Brigade and participated in the Battle of Arnhem in September 1944. The couple married and moved to the United Kingdom. They had one daughter, Tanya, born in 1960. After moving to London, Regin also took her mother and sister with her.

She was fluent in five languages: Serbo-Croatian, Russian, English, French and German. She learned English in only a few months after moving to London. She credited this in part to her extensive reading of Somerset Maugham's works.

In 1999, she participated in the London demonstrations against the NATO bombing of Serbia.

The media reported Regin's death on 8 April 2019 at age 87.

== Filmography ==
=== Films ===
Year	English title	Original title	Role	Director
1949	The Factory Story	Priča o fabrici	Textile worker	Vladimir Pogačić
1950	The Magic Sword	Čudotvorni mač	-	Vojislav Nanović
1952	Frosina	Frosina	-	Vojislav Nanović
1954	The House on the Coast	Das Haus an der Küste	Marina	Boško Kosanović
1954	Gynecologist's Tale	Roman eines Frauenarztes	Nina Bertens	Falk Harnack
1955	Echelon of Dr. M.	Ešalon dr M.	Hatidža	Žika Mitrović
1955	My quiet valley	Du mein stilles Tal	Rita	Leonard Steckel
1955	Rooster on the front	Der Frontgockel	Claudette, the French girl	Ferdinand Dörfler
1957	The Man Without a Body	-	Odette Vernet	Charles Saunders and W. Lee Wilder
1957	The Country Wife	Die Unschuld vom Lande	Lollo	Rudolf Schündler
1957	Goodbye, Franziska	Franziska	Helen Philipps	Wolfgang Liebeneiner
1957	Everything will be fine	Es wird alles wieder gut	Lucilla Coletti, the artist	Géza von Bolváry
1959	Don't Panic Chaps!	-	Elsa	George Pollock
1960	We Will Never Part	Wir wollen niemals auseinandergehn	Livia	Harald Reinl
1961	You Must Be Blonde on Capri	Blond muß man sein auf Capri	Helga Wagner	Wolfgang Schleif
1962	Number Six	Edgar Wallace Mysteries	Nadia Leiven	Robert Tronson
1962	Solo for Sparrow	Edgar Wallace Mysteries	Mrs. Reynnolds	Gordon Flemyng
1962	The Fur Collar	-	Marie Lejeune	Lawrence Huntington
1963	Stranglehold	-	Lilli	Lawrence Huntington
1963	From Russia with Love	-	Kerim's Girl	Terence Young
1964	Goldfinger	-	Bonita	Guy Hamilton
1964	Downfall	Edgar Wallace Mysteries	Suzanne Crossley	John Llewellyn Moxey
1964	Runaway	-	Laura Kossovich	John O'Shea

=== Television ===
Year	Title	Role	Notes
1958	The Adventures of William Tell	Maddelena	episode The Bride
1959	The Invisible Man	Princess Taima	episode Man in Power
1959	Rendezvous	Mary Darwin	episode Murder in Berkeley Square
1960	ITV Television Playhouse	Estelle	episode Once a Crook
1961	International Detective	Nora Galloway	episode The Anthony Case
1961	Danger Man	Melina	episode Find and Destroy
1961	Maigret	Maria	episode The Winning Ticket
1962	Parbottle Speaking	Zuhra	Main cast
1962	Brothers in Law	Nina Zoffany	episode Special Examiner
1962	Richard the Lionheart	Shirin	episode The Lord of Kerak
1962	Six More Faces of Jim	-	episode The Face of Wisdom
1963	The Benny Hill Show	Russian Girl	episode The Vanishing man
1963	Zero One	Didi Druson	episode The Creators
1963	Man of the World	Maria	episode In the Picture
1963	Crane	Maria Cortez	episode The Golden Attraction
1964	Secret Agent	Ira	episode The Professionals
1965	The Flying Swan	Tanja Sykes	episode Company Property
1965	Riviera Police	Lisa	episode The Lucky One Was the Snake
1965	The Third Man	Aldrina	episodes Members Only parts 1 & 2
1966	The Liars	Madame Moraldi	episode 1.1
1966	Donaugeschichten	-	episode W. M. und die Diplomatie
1966	The Man in Room 17	Roxana Polynescu	episode The Catacombs
1967	The Saint	Lucille Legrand	episode The Art Collectors
1967	Armchair Theatre	Ylena Davos	episode Reason for Sale
1967	Death happens to other people	Bettina	TV movie
1967–1968	Comedy Playhouse	Smyrna, the maid / Frederique Duval	episodes The Old Campaigner and Stiff Upped Lip
1968	The World of Beachcomber	-	episodes 1.4 and 1.6
1968	Dixon of Dock Green	Mrs. Green	episode Ania
