= Sotlar =

Sotlar is a surname. Notable people with the surname include:

- Bert Sotlar (1921–1992), Yugoslav film actor
- Lidija Sotlar (1929–2018), Serbian-born Slovenian ballet dancer and teacher
