= Carol Nugent =

American actress

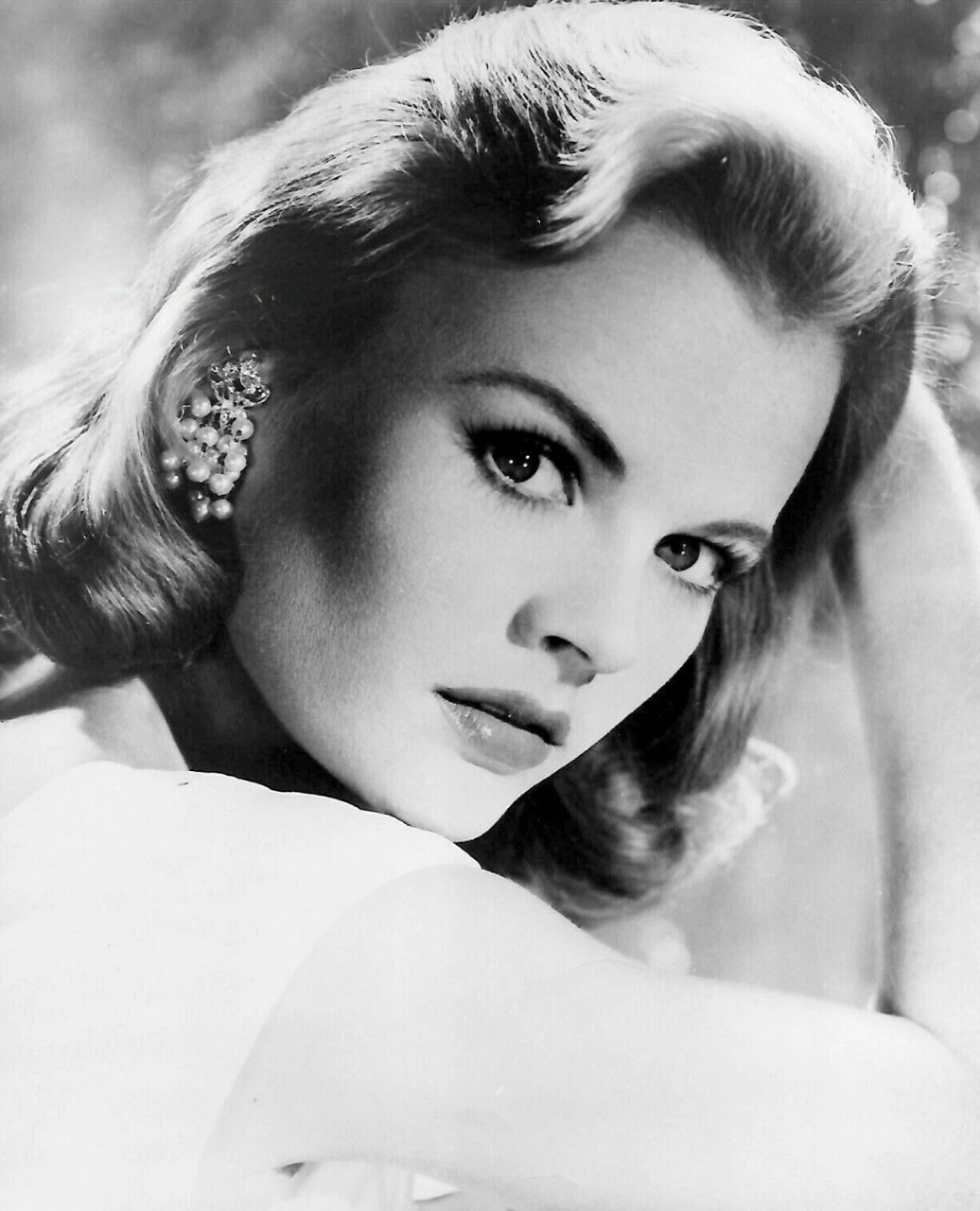
- Years active: 1944–1968
- Spouses: Nick Adams (m. 1959; died 1968) John G. Stephens (m. 2002; died 2018)
- Children: 2
- Relatives: Judy Nugent (sister)

Carol Nugent is an American actress who began her career as a child. Nugent appeared in over 20 feature films and 11 television programs during the 1940s, 1950s and 1960s. Her 1959 marriage to actor Nick Adams ended with his death in 1968, before their divorce had been finalized.

== Biography ==
=== Early life ===
Nugent is the elder daughter of Lucille Redd Nugent and Carl L. Nugent. Her father was a property master for MGM. She had a younger sister, Judy Nugent.

=== Hollywood career ===
Nugent was a child actor, first appearing on screen at age seven in Secret Command (1944). She played small parts in four more movies over the next three years and in one of these, she and her sister Judy portrayed the same character at different ages. They were featured on the television program The Ruggles. She was in a few popular hits, including Cheaper by the Dozen (1950) and Belles on Their Toes (1952) but as a child actor never quite made the transition from bit player to larger roles. However, as a teen Nugent grew into ingenue parts on television and in B-films. She was a supporting actress throughout her career, which tapered off sharply after she married and had children.

In 1955 Nugent, her sister, their father, and Harvey Waldman formed Nugent Productions for the production of Growing Up in Hollywood, a TV series to depict the two sisters growing up in a motion-picture atmosphere.

=== Personal life ===
Nugent married actor Nick Adams on May 10, 1959, in Las Vegas, Nevada. They had two children; she sued for divorce in November 1966.

In a 1961 interview Adams said, "Carol is my good-luck charm. My first real success, the turn of the tide, came right after I fell in love with her. Then I formed my own production company and we sold The Rebel." However, in the same interview Nugent said, "Let's not overdo the sweetness and light. Naturally, Nick and I had our problems at the start". Gossip columnist Rona Barrett later wrote that Nugent "was one of the most refreshing wives in the entire community."

Nugent married John G. Stephens in 2002; Stephens died in 2018.

== Filmography ==
- Secret Command (1944) as Joan
- Little Mister Jim (1946) as Clara
- The Sea of Grass (1947) as Sarah Beth at age 7
- Green Dolphin Street (1947) as Veronica at age 7
- It Had to Be You (1947) as Victoria at age 6
- Cheaper by the Dozen (1950) as Young Girl
- Trail of Robin Hood (1950) as Sis McGonigle
- Here Comes the Groom (1951) as McGonigle Girl
- It's a Big Country (1951) as Girl
- Belles on Their Toes (1952) as Lily Gilbreth
- The Story of Will Rogers (1952) as young Mary Rogers
- The Lusty Men (1952) as Rusty Davis
- Fast Company (1953) as Jigger Parkson
- Ma and Pa Kettle at Home (1954) as Nancy Kettle
- Drum Beat (1954) as Young Girl
- The Unguarded Moment (1956) as Dancer
- Lost, Lonely and Vicious (1958) as Pinkie
- The Badlanders (1958) as stagecoach passenger's daughter
- Inside the Mafia (1959) as Sandy Balcom
- The Crimson Kimono (1959) as Girl
- Vice Raid (1960) as Louise Hudson

== Television credits ==
- The Gene Autry Show: "Return of Maverick Dan" (1951) as Barbara "Bobbie" Blake
- TV Reader's Digest: "If I Were Rich" (1955)
- The Life and Legend of Wyatt Earp: "Shootin' Woman" (1957) as Young Woman
- The 20th Century-Fox Hour: "Threat to a Happy Ending" (1957) as Anne
- Death Valley Days: "The Calico Dog" (1957) as Nancy Drake
- The Adventures of Wild Bill Hickok: "Town Without Law" (1958) as Sue Lightfoot
- Mickey Spillane's Mike Hammer: "That Schoolgirl Complex" (1958) as Claudia
- Perry Mason: "The Case of the Fraudulent Foto" (1959) as Helen Preston
- The Millionaire: "Millionaire Charles Bradwell" (1959) as sister
- The Rebel: "Yellow Hair" (1959) as Indian Girl
- Family Affair: "A Matter of Tonsils" (1968) as Miss Jones
