= Vampyr =

1932 film

- Promotional image for Vampyr by Erik Aaes.
- Directed by: Carl Theodor Dreyer
- Screenplay by: Christen Jul; Carl Theodor Dreyer
- Based on: In a Glass Darkly a 1872 story collection by Sheridan Le Fanu
- Produced by: Carl Theodor Dreyer; Julian West
- Starring: Julian West (Nicolas de Gunzburg); Maurice Schutz; Rena Mandel; Sybille Schmitz; Jan Hieronimko; Henriette Gerard; Albert Bras
- Cinematography: Rudolph Maté
- Edited by: Tonka Taldy; Carl Theodor Dreyer
- Music by: Wolfgang Zeller
- Production companies: Carl Theodor Dreyer-Filmproduktion; Tobis-Filmkunst
- Distributed by: Vereinigte Star-Film GmbH (Germany)
- Release dates: 6 May 1932 (Germany); September 1932 (Paris)
- Running time: 73 minutes
- Countries: Germany; France
- Language: German

Vampyr (German: Vampyr – Der Traum des Allan Gray, lit. 'Vampyr: The Dream of Allan Gray') is a 1932 Gothic horror film directed by Danish director Carl Theodor Dreyer. It was written by Dreyer and Christen Jul based on elements from Sheridan Le Fanu's 1872 collection of supernatural stories In a Glass Darkly. The film was funded by Baron Nicolas de Gunzburg, who (credited as Julian West) also played the starring role of Allan Gray, a student of the occult who wanders into the French village of Courtempierre, which is under the curse of a vampire. Most of the other members of the cast were also non-professional actors.

The film presented a number of technical challenges for Dreyer, as it was his first sound film and was recorded in three languages. To simplify matters, he decided to use very little dialogue in the film, and much of the story is told with title cards, like a silent film. The film was shot entirely on location, and to enhance the atmospheric content, Dreyer opted for a washed out, soft focus photographic technique. The soundtrack was created in Berlin, where the characters' voices, the sound effects, and the score were recorded.

After having its release delayed by nine months, allegedly so the American films Dracula (1931) and Frankenstein (1931) could be released first, Vampyr was released in Germany, where it opened to a generally negative reception from both audiences and critics. Dreyer edited the film after its German premiere, and it opened to more mixed reviews in France. The film was long considered a low point in Dreyer's career, but modern critical reception has been much more favorable, with critics praising the film's disorienting visual effects and atmosphere. While not reaching the same level on praise as Dreyer's other films Ordet and The Passion of Joan of Arc, it has been featured on the Sight and Sound poll and some consider it one of the greatest films of all time.

== Plot ==
Late one evening, Allan Gray, a wandering student of the occult, arrives at an inn close to the village of Courtempierre, France, and rents a room. He is awakened from his sleep by an old man, who enters the locked room and leaves a small rectangular package on the table with "To be opened upon my death" written on the wrapping paper. Feeling drawn to investigate, Gray takes the package and leaves the inn.

Gray follows the shadow of a soldier with a peg leg to a disused factory, where he sees the shadow reunite with its body, and witnesses other shadows dancing. He also sees an old woman who seems to hold sway over the shadows, and encounters an old man with a mustache, who shows Gray the door.

Following some more shadows to a manor house, Gray looks through one of the windows and sees the lord of the manor, who is the man who gave him the package, get shot by the shadow of the soldier. Gray gets the attention of an old servant, and they rush to the lord of the manor, but it is too late to save him. Giséle, the lord of the manor's younger daughter, is there when he dies, but her sister, Léone, does not leave her bed, as she is gravely ill. A coachman is sent to get the police, and the old servant's wife invites Gray to stay the night.

In the library, Gray opens the package and finds a book inside about horrific demons called vampires. As he begins to read about how the creatures suck blood and gain control over the living and dead, Giséle says she sees Léone walking outside. They follow her, and, when they catch up, see the old woman from the factory bent over Léone's unconscious body. The old woman slinks away, and Léone, who is discovered to have fresh bite wounds, is carried back to bed. The carriage returns, but the coachman is dead.

The village doctor visits Léone at the manor, and Gray recognizes him as the old man with a mustache that he saw in the factory. The doctor tells Gray that Léone needs a blood transfusion, and Gray agrees to donate his blood. Exhausted from blood loss, Gray falls asleep. Meanwhile, the old servant has noticed the book and begun to read it. He learns that a vampire can be defeated by opening its grave at dawn and driving an iron bar through its heart, and that there are rumors that a vampire was really behind a previous epidemic in Courtempierre, with a woman named Marguerite Chopin being the prime suspect.

The old servant, seeing the doctor acting suspiciously, wakes Gray and rushes him to Léone's bedside, where he stops her from drinking poison that the old woman had the doctor bring to the manor. The doctor flees, kidnapping Giséle, and Gray follows. Just outside the factory, Gray trips and has an out-of-body experience, in which he sees himself dead, sealed in a coffin with a window, and carried away to be buried. After his spirit returns to his body, he notices the old servant heading to Marguerite Chopin's grave. They open the grave and find the old woman perfectly preserved, until they hammer a large metal bar through her heart, at which point she becomes a skeleton. The curse of the vampire is lifted, and, back at the manor, Léone suddenly recovers. (Note: Though she then seems to die, as she is seen to lie back down and take one final breath before becoming still.)

The ghost of the lord of the manor appears to the doctor, causing him to run away and the soldier to fall to his death down a flight of stairs. Using information he gathered during his out-of-body experience, Gray finds and unties Giséle. The doctor tries to hide in an old mill, but the old servant, seemingly aided by an unseen force, locks the doctor in a chamber where flour sacks are filled and activates the mill's machinery, which fills the chamber with flour and suffocates the doctor. Giséle and Gray cross a foggy river in a boat and find themselves in a bright clearing.

== Cast ==
- Nicolas de Gunzburg (credited as Julian West) as Allan Gray, a young wanderer whose studies of occult matters have made him a dreamer. Gray's view of the world is described as a blur of the real and unreal.
- Maurice Schutz as the Lord of the Manor, Giséle and Léone's father, who offers Gray a book about vampirism to help Gray save his daughters. After his murder, he returns briefly as a spirit and takes revenge on the village doctor and a soldier who had helped the vampire.
- Rena Mandel as Giséle, the younger daughter of the Lord of the Manor, who is kidnapped by the Village Doctor late in the film.
- Sybille Schmitz as Léone, the older daughter of the Lord of the Manor, who is in thrall to the vampire and finds her strength dwindling day by day.
- Jan Hieronimko as the Village Doctor, a pawn of the vampire. He kidnaps Giséle late in the film.
- Henriette Gérard as Marguerite Chopin, the vampire, an old woman whose hold extends beyond her immediate victims. Many villagers, including the doctor, are her minions.
- Albert Bras as the Old Servant, a servant at the manor house. When Gray is incapacitated after donating blood to Léone, he finds the book on vampirism and, aided by Gray, ends the vampire's reign of terror.
- N. Babanini as the Old Servant's Wife
- Jane Mora as the Nurse
- Georges Boidin as the Limping Soldier with a peg leg (uncredited)

== Production ==
=== Development ===
Carl Theodor Dreyer began planning Vampyr in late 1929, a year after the release of his previous film, The Passion of Joan of Arc. The production company behind Joan of Arc had plans to make another film with Dreyer, but that project was dropped, which led Dreyer to decide to go outside the studio system to make his next film.

Vampyr was made under difficult circumstances, as the arrival of sound to film had put the European film industry in turmoil. The French film studios lagged behind technologically, and the first French sound films were shot on sound stages in England. As Vampyr was Dreyer's first sound film, he went to England to study the new technology, and, while there, he got together with Danish writer Christen Jul, who was living in London at the time.

Wanting to create a story based on the supernatural, Dreyer read over thirty mystery stories. He found a number of re-occurring elements, such as doors opening mysteriously and door handles moving with no one knowing why, which helped him feel that, "We can jolly well make this stuff too". The success of the stage version of Dracula in London and New York in 1927 contributed to Dreyer's assessment that vampires were "fashionable things at the time", and he Jul created a story based on elements from Sheridan Le Fanu's In a Glass Darkly, a collection of five stories first published in 1872; Vampyr draws from two stories in the collection: Carmilla, a lesbian vampire story, and The Room in the Dragon Volant, which is about a live burial.

Dreyer found it difficult to decide on a title for the film. Early titles may have included Destiny and Shadows of Hell, and, when the film was presented in the March 1931 issue of the film journal Close Up, it was referred to as The Strange Adventure of David Gray.

=== Pre-production ===
Dreyer returned to France to begin casting and location scouting. At that time, in France there was a small movement of artistic independently financed films, including Luis Buñuel's L'Âge d'Or and Jean Cocteau's The Blood of a Poet which were both produced in 1930. Through Valentine Hugo, Dreyer met Nicolas de Gunzburg, an aristocrat who agreed to finance Dreyer's next film in return for playing the lead role in it. Gunzberg had arguments with his family about becoming an actor, so he created the pseudonym "Julian West", a name that would be the same in all three languages in which the film was going to be shot.

The village doctor suffocates under flour dropped from the mill above. This scene was added to the script during the film's production. German censors requested that the scene be toned down.

Most members of the cast of Vampyr were not professional actors. Jan Hieronimko, who plays the village doctor, was found on a late night metro train in Paris. When approached to act in the film, Hieronimko reportedly stared blankly and did not reply, but he later contacted Dreyer's crew and agreed to join the film. Many of the other non-professional actors in the film were found in similar fashion in shops and cafés. The only professional actors in the film were Maurice Schutz, who plays the lord of the manor, and Sybille Schmitz, who plays his daughter Léone.

Many of the film's crew members had worked with Dreyer on Joan of Arc, cinematographer Rudolph Maté and art director Hermann Warm among them. Dreyer and Maté contributed to the location scouting for Vampyr, but Dreyer left most of the scouting to an assistant, who he instructed to find, among other locations, "a factory in ruins, a chopped up phantom, worthy of the imagination of Edgar Allan Poe. Somewhere in Paris. We can't travel far."

In the original script, the village doctor was intended to flee the village and get trapped in a swamp. Dreyer later related that, while looking for a suitable mire, he and his team passed a house where "strange white shadows danced around the windows and doors". They discovered it was a plaster mill, and, wanting to try to capture the same effect of air full of white powder in the film, decided to change the film's ending to take place in a flour mill.

=== Filming ===
Vampyr was filmed between 1930 and 1931. The entire film was shot on location, with many scenes shot in Courtempierre, France. Dreyer felt shooting on location would lend the film the feel of a dream-like ghost world, as well as save money. The scenes in the manor house were shot in April and May 1930. The manor house also served as housing for the cast and crew during the filming, but life there was unpleasant, as it was cold and infested with rats. The scene in the churchyard was shot in August 1930. The church was really a barn with a number of tombstones placed around it by art director Warm.

Dreyer originally wanted Vampyr to be a silent film, and, indeed, no sound was captured during filming and it uses many techniques from the silent era, such as title cards to explain the story. Dialogue was kept to a minimum in the film, both for this reason, and because three different versions of the film were planned, so the scenes with dialogue had to be filmed with the actors mouthing their lines in German, French, and English during separate takes so that their lip movements would correspond to the voices that were going to be recorded in post-production.

Critic and writer Kim Newman described the style of Vampyr as being more like that of experimental features such as Un Chien Andalou (1929), than "quickie horror film[s]" made after the release of Dracula (1931). Dreyer originally was going to film Vampyr in what he described as a "heavy style", but changed direction after cinematographer Maté showed him a shot that came out fuzzy and blurred. This washed-out look was an effect Dreyer desired, and he had Maté shoot the rest of the film through a piece of gauze held three feet (.9 m) away from the camera to re-create it. For other visuals in the film, Dreyer found inspiration in the fine arts. Actress Rena Mandel, who plays Giséle, said Dreyer showed her reproductions of paintings by Francisco Goya during filming. In Denmark, Henry Hellsen, a journalist and friend of Dreyer, wrote in detail about the film and the artworks that it appeared to draw from.

=== Post-production ===
Allan Gray (Nicolas de Gunzburg) finds a coffin containing himself in a dream sequence. Modern critics praise this sequence as one of the most memorable sequences from Vampyr.

Dreyer shot and edited the film in France, then moved to Berlin, where it was post-synchronized in both German and French; there is no record of the planned English version of the film being completed. The audio work was done at Universum Film AG, as they had the best sound equipment available to Dreyer at the time. The only actors who dubbed their own voices are Gunzburg as Gray and Sybille Schmitz as Léone. The sounds of dogs, parrots, and other animals in the film were created by professional human animal imitators. Wolfgang Zeller composed the film's score, working with Dreyer to develop the music.

When asked about his intention with the film at the Berlin premiere, Dreyer replied that he "had not any particular intention. I just wanted to make a film different from all other films. I wanted, if you will, to break new ground for the cinema. That is all." Asked if he succeeded, he replied: "Yes, I have broken new ground".

There are scenes that were included in the script and shot that do not exist in any current prints of Vampyr. These scenes include: the vampire in the factory recoiling from a cross formed by the shadow of a window frame, the vampire exerting her control over a pack of dogs, and the ferryman guiding Gray and Giséle across the river by getting young children to build a fire and sing a hymn. Additionally, there are differences between the German and French versions of the film. The character of "David Gray" was renamed "Allan Gray" for the German version, which Dreyer attributed to a mistake, and the German censors ordered cuts to the film that still exist today in some prints. The scenes that had to be toned down for the German version include the vampire's death from the stake and the doctor's death under the milled flour.

Dreyer also prepared a Danish version of the film, based on the German version, but with Danish title cards and subtitles. The distributor could not afford to have the title cards for this version to be done in the same manner as they appear in the German version, so they were done in a simpler style, but Dreyer would not allow the pages from the book shown in the film to be presented as plain title cards in the Danish version, saying: "Don't you understand that the old book is not a text in the ordinary, stupid sense, but an actor just as much as the others?"

== Release ==
The premiere of Vampyr in Germany was delayed by UFA for approximately nine months, as the studio wanted the American films Dracula (1931) and Frankenstein (1931) to be released first, but the film was still a financial failure. When it finally premiered in Berlin on 6 May 1932, the audience booed the film, and Dreyer reportedly removed several scenes following the first showing. At a showing of the film in Vienna, audiences demanded their money back. When this was denied, a riot broke out, and police restored order with night sticks.

The Paris premiere of the film took place in September 1932, as the opening attraction of a new cinema on the Boulevard Raspail. Société Générale de Cinema, which had previously distributed Dreyer's Joan of Arc, distributed the film in France.

When the film premiered in Copenhagen in March 1933, Dreyer did not attend, as he had suffered a nervous breakdown and was in a mental hospital in France.

In the United States, the film premiered with English subtitles under the title Not Against the Flesh. Castle of Doom, an English-dubbed version edited severely as to both the film continuity and the music track, appeared a few years later on the roadshow circuit.

=== Critical reception ===
Reviews of the film at the time of its initial release in Europe ranged from mixed to negative. The press in Germany did not like the film. After the Berlin premiere, a film critic from The New York Times wrote: "Whatever you think of the director Charles [sic] Theodor Dreyer, there is no denying that he is 'different'. He does things that make people talk about him. You may find his films ridiculous—but you won't forget them...Although in many ways [Vampyr] was one of the worst films I have ever attended, there were some scenes in it that gripped with brutal directness". Critical reaction to the film in Paris was mixed. Reporter Herbert Matthews of The New York Times called Vampyr "a hallucinating film", that "either held the spectators spellbound as in a long nightmare or else moved them to hysterical laughter". For many years after the initial release of the film, it was viewed by critics as one of Dreyer's weaker works.

More modern reception for Vampyr has been more positive. On the review aggregator website Rotten Tomatoes 98% of 46 critics' reviews of the film are positive, with an average rating of 8.7/10; the site's "critics consensus" reads: "Full of disorienting visual effects, Carl Theodor Dreyer's Vampyr is as theoretically unsettling as it is conceptually disturbing." Todd Kristel of the online film database AllMovie gave the film four and a half stars out of five, writing that it "isn't the easiest classic film to enjoy, even if you are a fan of 1930s horror movies", but, "If you're patient with the slow pacing and ambiguous story line of Vampyr, you'll find that this film offers many striking images", and saying that, although it is "not exciting in terms of pacing, it's a good choice if you want to see a film that establishes a compelling mood". Jonathan Rosenbaum of the Chicago Reader wrote: "The greatness of Carl Dreyer's [Vampyr] derives partly from its handling of the vampire theme in terms of sexuality and eroticism and partly from its highly distinctive, dreamy look, but it also has something to do with Dreyer's radical recasting of narrative form". J. Hoberman of the Village Voice wrote that "Vampyr is Dreyer's most radical film—maybe one of my dozen favorite movies by any director". Anton Bitel of Channel 4 awarded the film four and a half stars out of five, calling it "lesser known (but in many ways superior)" to the 1922 silent vampire film Nosferatu, and writing: "a triumph of the irrational, Dreyer's eerie memento mori never allows either protagonist or viewer fully to wake up from its surreal nightmare".

In the early 2010s, the London edition of Time Out polled several authors, directors, actors, and critics who have worked within the horror genre about the best horror films, and Vampyr placed 50th out of 100. Andrei Tarkovsky considered the film a masterpiece and named it one of the 77 essential works of cinema. In the 2022 Sight and Sound critic's poll, it was ranked at 146th place, tying with Chinatown, The Watermelon Woman, Alien, India Song, and La Grande Illusion.

=== Home media ===
Vampyr has been released with imperfect image and sound, as the original German and French film and sound negatives are lost. Prints of the French and German versions of the film exist, but most are either incomplete or damaged. It has been released in the United States under the titles of The Vampire and Castle of Doom, and in the United Kingdom under the title of The Strange Adventures of David Gray, but many of these prints are severely cut, such as the re-dubbed English-language Castle of Doom print, which runs 60-minutes.

The film was originally released on DVD on 13 May 1998 by Image Entertainment, which had an abridged 72-minute running time. Image's release of Vampyr is a straight port of the Laserdisc that film restorer David Shepard produced in 1991. The subtitles are large and ingrained, due to the source print having Danish subtitles that have been blacked out and covered. This DVD includes Ladislas Starevich's 1933 stop motion animated short film The Mascot as a bonus feature.

The Criterion Collection released a two-disc DVD edition of Vampyr on 22 July 2008. This release includes the original German version of the film sourced from an HD digital transfer of the 1998 restoration, numerous special features, and a book featuring Dreyer and Christen Jul's original screenplay and Sheridan Le Fanu's 1872 story "Carmilla". Criterion released this package on Blu-ray in October 2017.

A Region 2 DVD of the film was released by Eureka Video as part of its Masters of Cinema series on 25 August 2008. The Eureka release contains the same bonus material as the Criterion Collection discs, but also includes two deleted scenes and an audio commentary by director Guillermo del Toro. A 2022 Blu-ray release from Eureka Video made from a new 2K restoration of the film done by the Danish Film Institute contains two audio tracks, one restored and the other unrestored, and the same extras as their 2008 DVD release.

== See also ==
- List of cult films
- List of French films of 1932
- List of German films 1919–1933
- List of horror films of the 1930s
- Vampire film
