= Judy Nugent =

American actress (1940–2023)

- Nugent in Sugarfoot, 1959
- Born: Judy Ann Nugent; August 22, 1940; Los Angeles, California, U.S.
- Died: October 26, 2023 (aged 83); Montana, U.S.
- Occupation: Actress
- Years active: 1947–1978
- Spouse: Buck Taylor (m. 1961; div. 1981)
- Children: 4
- Relatives: Carol Nugent (sister)

Judy Ann Nugent (August 22, 1940 – October 26, 2023) was an American actress.

== Early life ==
Judy Ann Nugent was born on August 22, 1940, in Los Angeles, California. She was the daughter of Carl Leon Nugent and Lucille Jane Redd. Her older sister, Carol Nugent, also became an actress.

== Career ==
Nugent was a child actor, first appearing on screen at age six in It Had to Be You (1947), where she and her sister Carol portrayed the same character at different ages. A few bit parts in films were followed by her landing a regular role in television's first family sitcom, The Ruggles (1949–1952). Her film career then took off with supporting parts in several mid-fifties dramas, including Magnificent Obsession (1954), one of the Kettle kids in Ma and Pa Kettle Back on the Farm (1954) and There's Always Tomorrow (1956) for Universal-International.

Clint Eastwood and Judy Nugent in Rawhide, 1959

Two of her roles were as Jet Maypen for the Walt Disney Presents: Annette serial on The Mickey Mouse Club and as little Ann Carson, the little blind girl who flew around the world with Superman, on the Adventures of Superman. As she reached adulthood, her parts were mainly guest appearances on television shows, including the ABC/Warner Brothers Television series 77 Sunset Strip and Sugarfoot, as well as Willie Carst in the Rawhide episode Incident of the Night Horse.

While Nugent appeared in five episodes of The Tall Man as June McBean with thought made to spin The McBeans off into a series, she gave up acting after marrying in 1961. Nugent did cameos for two independent film productions during the seventies.

== Personal life ==
On March 18, 1961, Nugent married actor Buck Taylor, but reportedly began annulment proceedings within less than a month. They married again on June 14, 1963, and remained married until divorcing in 1981. The marriage produced a daughter, Tiffany, and three sons, Adam, Matthew and Cooper.

Nugent died from cancer at her Montana ranch, on October 26, 2023, at the age of 83. She was predeceased by her son Adam, who died in a motorcycle accident at age 27 in 1994.

== Filmography ==
- It Had to Be You (1947) ... as Victoria at age 5
- The Big Clock (1948) ... as Little Girl (uncredited)
- City Across the River (1949) ... as Little Girl (uncredited)
- Here Comes the Groom (1951) ... as McGonigle Girl (uncredited)
- Angels in the Outfield (1951) ... as Margaret (uncredited)
- Night Stage to Galveston (1952) ... as Daughter
- The Greatest Show on Earth (1952) ... as Little Girl (uncredited)
- Down Laredo Way (1953) ... as Taffy Wells
- Ma and Pa Kettle at Home (1954) ... as Betty Kettle
- Magnificent Obsession (1954) ... as Judy
- There's Always Tomorrow (1956) ... as Frances 'Frankie' Groves
- Navy Wife (1956) ... as Debby Blain
- The Girl Most Likely (1956) ... as Pauline
- High School Caesar (1960) ... as Wanda Anderson
- Summer Run (1974) ... as Debbie
- Beartooth (1978) ... as Judy Green

== Television ==
- The Ruggles: series regular (1949–1952) ....as Donna Ruggles
- The Lone Ranger: "Triple Cross" (1953) ....as Susie Rich
- Annie Oakley: "Valley of the Shadows" (1954) ....as Donna Bishop
- Adventures of Superman: "Around the World with Superman" (1954) ....as Ann Carson
- The Ford Television Theatre: "Remember to Live" (1954) ....as Kathy Johnson
- The Life of Riley: "Riley's Wild Oats" (1954) ....as Janet
- The Man Behind the Badge: "The Case of the Deadly Delicacy" (1955) ....as Donna
- Lassie: 2 episodes (1955–56) ....as Spike
- Celebrity Playhouse: "The Twelve Year Secret" (1956) ....as Actress
- Matinee Theatre: "Greybeards and Witches" (1956) ....as Emma
- The Mickey Mouse Club: "Annette" (1957) ....as Jet Maypen
- Playhouse 90: "The Gentleman from Seventh Avenue" (1958) ....as Jenny
- The Thin Man: "The Delinquent" (1958) ....as Jinx
- The Ann Sothern Show: "The Road to Health" (1959) ....as Gloria
- Sugarfoot: "Wolf" (1959) ....as Charonne
- 77 Sunset Strip: "Vacation with Pay" (1959) ....as Bobbie Anderson
- Rawhide: "Incident of the Night Horse" (1960) ....as Willie
- The Tall Man: recurring role (1960–62) ....as June McBean
- The Brothers Brannagan: "Mantrap" (1961) ....as Girl
- Saints and Sinners: "Luscious Lois" (1962) ....as Phoebe Hawley
