= Tinker Bell Talks =

2016 autobiography by Margaret Kerry

Tinker Bell Talks: Tales of a Pixie Dusted Life
- Author: Margaret Kerry
- Language: English
- Publisher: CreateSpace
- Publication date: July 18, 2016 (First Edition)
- Publication place: United States
- Pages: 436
- ISBN: 978-1-5335-0075-5

Tinker Bell Talks: Tales of a Pixie Dusted Life is an autobiography by American actress, motivational speaker, radio host and author Margaret Kerry. The memoir recounts the actress' lengthy Hollywood career, her faith and relationships through her life. Starting in childhood appearing in Our Gang comedy shorts, being the reference model for the character of Tinker Bell in Walt Disney's Peter Pan, her appearances on The Lone Ranger and The Andy Griffith Show, and starring in The Ruggles on ABC-TV, to becoming a voiceover performer, a motivational speaker, and radio host. The book includes 180 photos and artwork.
