= Rudolph Maté =

Polish-Hungarian cinematographer and film director (1898–1964)

- Born: Rudolf Mayer; 21 January 1898; Kraków, Austria-Hungary (present-day Poland)
- Died: 27 October 1964 (aged 66); Beverly Hills, California, U.S.
- Education: Eötvös Loránd University
- Occupations: Cinematographer; film director
- Years active: 1919–1964
- Spouses: Paula Sophie Hartkop (m. 1929; died 1937) Regina Opoczynski (m. 1941; div. 1958)
- Children: 1

Rudolph Maté (born Rudolf Mayer; 21 January 1898 – 27 October 1964) was a Polish-Hungarian cinematographer and film director, who worked variously in Hungary, Austria, Germany, France, and the United States. He was a five-time Academy Award nominee for his photographic work.

In Europe, Maté collaborated with notable directors including Fritz Lang, René Clair, and Carl Theodor Dreyer, attracting notable recognition for The Passion of Joan of Arc (1928) and Vampyr (1932). In 1935, he relocated to the United States serving as a cinematographer on notable Hollywood films, including Dodsworth (1936), Foreign Correspondent (1940), and Gilda (1946).

By 1947, Maté became a film director, with notable titles such as D.O.A. (1950), When Worlds Collide (1951), and The 300 Spartans (1962).

== Early years ==
Rudolph Maté was born Rudolf Mayer on 21 January 1898 in Kraków (then in the Grand Duchy of Kraków, Austro-Hungarian Empire, currently in Poland) into an upper-class Jewish family. In 1919, he graduated at the University of Budapest (now Eötvös Loránd University) having studied art.

He began working in the film industry as a laboratory assistant and an assistant cameraman for Alexander Korda at the Corvin Film Studio. The same year, Maté was appointed to the Communist Directory of the Arts, responsible for nationalizing the film industry. However, in 1920, these plans were abandoned after Miklós Horthy came to power and banned the Hungarian Communist Party. Korda, along with Maté, subsequently relocated to Vienna to work for Sascha-Film.

== Cinematography ==
=== In Europe ===
In 1924, Maté went to Berlin to work as a second unit camera operator for Erich Pommer. He later hired Maté as an assistant cinematographer to Karl Freund on Mikaël (1924). His influence on the film inspired Carl Theodor Dreyer to hire him as cinematographer on The Passion of Joan of Arc (1928). Maté's work has been praised as among the best of the silent film era, with film historian John Wakeman noting his high-contrast lighting brought out facial features on the actors with stark clarity. Wheeler Winston Dixon also noted Maté photographed "each shot with a radiant clarity, often using a halo 'iris' effect during Joan's close-ups, to accentuate her isolation and persecution during the trial. Often, Maté frames Joan slightly from above, looking down at her with a mixture of reverence and sadness, which also serves to suggest her powerlessness during her interrogation by the judges".

His next collaboration with Dreyer was Vampyr (1932). The entire film was shot on location with numerous scenes shot in Courtempierre, France. During filming, Maté had shot some scenes that appeared blurry and fuzzy, after natural light had accidentally shone into the camera lens. Dreyer accepted the results, and had a gauze placed .9-metre (2 ft 11 in) in front of the camera to recreate the effect. In addition, Maté collaborated with Fritz Lang and René Clair while in France. His reputation in Europe made him one of the most requested cinematographers that he accepted a contract with Fox Film Corporation.

=== In the United States ===
In 1935, Maté moved to Hollywood, working on his first American film titled Dante's Inferno (1935). A year later, Maté left Fox Film to work on Dodsworth (1936) for Samuel Goldwyn. A few years later, Goldwyn selected Maté as his in-house cinematographer, replacing Gregg Toland who decided to become a wartime film director. He was nominated for the Academy Award for Best Cinematography in five consecutive years, for Alfred Hitchcock's Foreign Correspondent (1940), Alexander Korda's That Hamilton Woman (1941), Sam Wood's The Pride of the Yankees (1942), Zoltan Korda's Sahara (1943), and Charles Vidor's Cover Girl (1944).

== Director ==
While working for Columbia Pictures, Maté initially signed on as cinematographer on It Had to Be You (1947). However, during production, he began to assume more directorial responsibilities from Don Hartman. Vincent J. Farrar was brought in as a second cinematographer to take over from Maté, who was later credited as both co-director and co-cinematographer on the film. Columbia Pictures president Harry Cohn had taken notice and hired Maté as a director. His first solo directorial debut was the 1948 film noir thriller The Dark Past, a remake of Blind Alley (1939). Maté's relationship with Harry Cohn proved contentious at times, with Cohn berating him on one occasion that Maté could barely stammer out his responses.

His most notable film was D.O.A. (1950), a film noir in which Frank Bigelow (portrayed by Edmond O'Brien) is slowly dying of poison and races against the clock to find out the real culprits. A review in The New York Times deemed the film "a fairly obvious and plodding recital, involving crime, passion, stolen iridium, gangland beatings and one man's innocent bewilderment upon being caught up in a web of circumstance that marks him for death". William Brogdon of Variety felt Maté's direction "lingers too long over [the first portion of the story], spreading expectancy very thin, but when he does launch his suspense-building it comes over with a solid wallop."

Maté later directed the suspense film Union Station (1950), which starred William Holden and Barry Fitzgerald, and Branded (1950) which starred Alan Ladd. Maté next directed The Prince Who Was a Thief (1951), starring Tony Curtis and Piper Laurie. His most successful film was the science fiction disaster When Worlds Collide (1951). The film earned an Honorary Academy Award for Best Special Effects.

Maté's last Hollywood film was the historical epic The 300 Spartans (1962). His final film (co-directed with Primo Zeglio) was the Italian adventure film Seven Seas to Calais (1963), starring Rod Taylor. He traveled to Greece to film a low-budget romantic comedy titled Aliki (1963) starring Aliki Vougiouklaki.

== Personal life ==
In 1929, Maté married Paula Sophie Hartkop in Paris. The couple arrived in the United States in 1935; in August 1937, Paula Sophie died from complications of pneumonia. On July 6, 1941, he married Regina Opoczynski in Las Vegas. They had one son named Christopher. The couple divorced in 1958 after Maté had left his wife stranded in France for four weeks.

=== Death ===
On 27 October 1964, Maté died from a heart attack at his home in Beverly Hills, aged 66.

== Filmography ==
=== As director ===
- It Had to Be You (1947)
- The Dark Past (1948)
- D.O.A. (1950)
- No Sad Songs for Me (1950)
- Union Station (1950)
- Branded (1950)
- The Prince Who Was a Thief (1951)
- When Worlds Collide (1951)
- The Green Glove (1952)
- Sally and Saint Anne (1952)
- Paula (1952)
- The Mississippi Gambler (1953)
- Second Chance (1953)
- Forbidden (1953)
- The Black Shield of Falworth (1954)
- Siege at Red River (1954)
- The Violent Men (1955)
- The Far Horizons (1955)
- Miracle in the Rain (1956)
- The Rawhide Years (1956)
- Port Afrique (1956)
- Three Violent People (1957)
- The Deep Six (1958)
- For the First Time (1959)
- Revak the Rebel (1960)
- The 300 Spartans (1962)
- Seven Seas to Calais (1962)
- Aliki My Love (1963)

=== As producer ===
- The Return of October (1948)
- The 300 Spartans (1962)
- Aliki my love (1963)

=== As cinematographer ===
- Kutató Sámuel (1919)
- Alpentragödie (1920)
- Das Gänsemädchen (1920)
- Lucifer (1921)
- Der geistliche Tod (1921)
- Parema - Das Wesen aus der Sternenwelt (1922)
- Eine mystische Straßenreklame (1922)
- Dunkle Gassen (1923)
- Das verlorene Ich (1923)
- The Merchant of Venice (1923)
- The Lost Soul, or: The Dangers of Hypnotism (1923)
- Michael (1924)
- Peter the Pirate (1925)
- Excluded from the Public (1927)
- The Impostor (1927)
- Infantrist Wamperls dreijähriges Pech (1927)
- The Passion of Joan of Arc (1928)
- Franz Schubert und seine Zeit (1928)
- Die Bauernprinzessin (1928)
- Der Lohn der guten Tat (1928)
- Miss Europe (1930)
- Le monsieur de minuit (1931)
- Vampyr (1932)
- Monsieur Albert (1932)
- La couturière de Luneville (1932)
- Lily Christine (1932)
- Insult (1932)
- Aren't We All? (1932)
- The Merry Monarch (1933)
- Die Abenteuer des Königs Pausole (1933)
- Les aventures du roi Pausole (1933)
- Une femme au volant (1933)
- On the Streets (1933)
- Paprika (1933)
- The Last Billionaire (1934)
- Liliom (1934)
- Nothing More Than a Woman (1934) (Spanish language version of Pursued)
- Dante's Inferno (1935)
- Dressed to Thrill (1935)
- Metropolitan (1935)
- Navy Wife (1935)
- Professional Soldier (1935)
- Charlie Chan's Secret (1936)
- Dodsworth (1936)
- A Message to Garcia (1936)
- Our Relations (1936)
- Come and Get It (1936)
- Outcast (1937)
- Stella Dallas (1937)
- The Adventures of Marco Polo (1938)
- Blockade (1938)
- Youth Takes a Fling (1938)
- Trade Winds (1938)
- Love Affair (1939)
- The Real Glory (1939)
- My Favorite Wife (1940)
- Foreign Correspondent (1940)
- The Westerner (1940)
- Seven Sinners (1940)
- That Hamilton Woman (1941)
- The Flame of New Orleans (1941)
- It Started with Eve (1941)
- To Be or Not to Be (1942)
- The Pride of the Yankees (1942)
- They Got Me Covered (1943)
- Sahara (1943)
- Address Unknown (1944)
- Cover Girl (1944)
- Tonight and Every Night (1945)
- Over 21 (1945)
- Gilda (1946)
- Down to Earth (1947)
- It Had to Be You (1947)
- The Lady from Shanghai (1947) (uncredited)

== Awards and nominations ==
Institution	Year	Category	Work	Result	Ref.
Academy Awards	1941	Best Cinematography (Black-and-White)	Foreign Correspondent	Nominated	
Academy Awards	1942	Best Cinematography (Black-and-White)	That Hamilton Woman	Nominated	
Academy Awards	1943	Best Cinematography (Black-and-White)	The Pride of the Yankees	Nominated	
Academy Awards	1944	Best Cinematography (Black-and-White)	Sahara	Nominated	
Academy Awards	1945	Best Cinematography (Color)	Cover Girl	Nominated	
San Sebastián International Film Festival	1954	Grand Prize	The Black Shield of Falworth	Nominated	

== Bibliography ==
- Clarens, Carlos (1997). An Illustrated History of Horror and Science-fiction Films. Da Capo Press. ISBN 0-306-80800-5.
- Dixon, Wheeler Winston (2015). Black and White Cinema: A Short History. Rutgers University Press. ISBN 978-0-813-57244-4.
- Langman, Larry (2000). Destination Hollywood: The Influence of Europeans on American Filmmaking. McFarland. pp. 205–206. ISBN 978-0-786-40681-4.
- Maltin, Leonard (2012). The Art of the Cinematographer: A Survey and Interviews with Five Masters. Dover Publications. pp. 37–39. ISBN 978-0-486-15474-9.
- St. Pierre, Paul Matthew (2016). Cinematography in the Weimar Republic: Lola Lola, Dirty Singles, and the Men Who Shot Them. Fairleigh Dickinson University Press. ISBN 978-1-611-47945-4.
- Thomas, Bob (1990). King Cohn: The Life and Times of Hollywood Mogul Harry Cohn. McGraw-Hill. ISBN 978-0-070-64261-4.
- Wakeman, John (1987). World Film Directors: Volume 1—1890–1945. H. W. Wilson. ISBN 978-0-824-20757-1.
