= Number Six (film) =

1962 British film by Robert Tronson

- Theatrical release poster
- Directed by: Robert Tronson
- Screenplay by: Philip Mackie
- Produced by: Jack Greenwood
- Starring: Nadja Regin Ivan Desny Brian Bedford
- Edited by: Derek Holding
- Music by: Bernard Ebbinghouse
- Production company: Merton Park Studios
- Distributed by: Anglo-Amalgamated
- Release date: 1962
- Running time: 58 minutes
- Country: United Kingdom
- Language: English

Number Six (also known as Number 6) is a 1962 British film directed by Robert Tronson and starring Nadja Regin, Ivan Desny and Brian Bedford. The screenplay was by Philip Mackie. It is part of the series of Edgar Wallace Mysteries films made at Merton Park Studios.

== Plot ==
Detective Superintendent Hallett of Scotland Yard is on the trail of international criminal Charles Valentine, and unconventionally puts a secret agent – "Number Six" – on the case, whose true identity he keeps a closely-guarded secret. When Valentine is attacked by a night-club waiter, young Jimmy Gale intervenes and Valentine takes him in as his assistant in a robbery, and goes ahead with his plans to rob wealthy heiress Nadia Leiven. When Hallett tells Valentine that he is being watched by Number Six, Valentine tries desperately to find out the agent's identity.

== Cast ==
- Nadja Regin as Nadia Leiven
- Ivan Desny as Charles Valentine
- Brian Bedford as Jimmy Gale
- Michael Goodliffe as Detective Superintendent Hallett
- Joyce Blair as Carol Clyde
- Leonard Sachs as Welland
- Maxwell Shaw as Luigi Pirani
- Harold Goodwin as Smith
- John Welsh as Assistant Commissioner
- Barrie Ingham as house agent
- Derrick Sherwin as Detective Sargeant Waters

== Critical reception ==
The Monthly Film Bulletin wrote: "Something more typical of vintage Edgar Wallace than the rest of the series, especially in its twist ending. Technical presentation and dialogue are reasonably slick; the production's quiet, unassuming tone and touches of humour most apt."
