= Illusion in a Minor Key =

1952 film directed by Rudolf Jugert

- Directed by: Rudolf Jugert
- Written by: Fritz Rotter
- Produced by: Erich Pommer
- Starring: Hildegard Knef; Sybille Schmitz; Hardy Krüger
- Cinematography: Václav Vích
- Edited by: Claus von Boro
- Music by: Friedrich Meyer
- Production company: Bavaria Film
- Distributed by: Allianz Filmverleih
- Release date: 18 December 1952
- Running time: 101 minutes
- Country: West Germany
- Language: German

Illusion in a Minor Key (German: Illusion in Moll) is a 1952 West German drama film directed by Rudolf Jugert and starring Hildegard Knef, Sybille Schmitz and Hardy Krüger. It was made at the Bavaria Studios in Munich. It was one of the last films produced by the veteran Erich Pommer who had returned to Germany from exile after the Second World War. The film's sets were designed by Ludwig Reiber. It is sometimes included on lists of film noirs.

== Synopsis ==
The recently widowed owner of a hotel falls in love with the wayward bandleader who performs at the establishment. Her plans to marry him upset her children who believe he is simply after her money.

== Cast ==
- Hildegard Knef as Lydia Bauer
- Sybille Schmitz as Maria Alsbacher
- Hardy Krüger as Paul Alsbacher
- Maurice Teynac as Night Club Singer Herr Gidou
- Albrecht Schoenhals as Werner Alsbacher
- Lina Carstens as Bertha
- Herbert Hübner as Dr. Bauer
- Walter Janssen as Friedrich
- Viktor Afritsch
- Nadja Tiller as Vera
- Gaby Fehling as Dorothy Alsbacher
- Anneliese Born as Frau Bauer
- Siegfried Breuer Jr. as Kurt
- Else Wolz
- Rudi Risavy
- Robert Graf as Franz
- Lys Assia as Singer
- Michl Lang as Bauer

== Bibliography ==
- Bock, Hans; Bergfelder, Tim (1 September 2009). The Concise Cinegraph: Encyclopaedia of German Cinema. Berghahn Books. ISBN 978-0-85745-565-9.
- Spicer, Andrew (2010). Historical Dictionary of Film Noir. Scarecrow Press. ISBN 978-0-8108-5960-9.
