= An Ideal Husband (1935 film) =

1935 film

- Directed by: Herbert Selpin
- Written by: Oscar Wilde (play); Thea von Harbou
- Produced by: Harry Dettmann
- Starring: Brigitte Helm; Sybille Schmitz; Karl Ludwig Diehl
- Cinematography: Emil Schünemann
- Edited by: Lena Neumann
- Music by: Werner Bochmann
- Production company: Terra Film
- Distributed by: Terra Film
- Release date: 6 September 1935
- Running time: 85 minutes
- Country: Germany
- Language: German

An Ideal Husband (German: Ein idealer Gatte) is a 1935 German comedy film directed by Herbert Selpin and starring Brigitte Helm, Sybille Schmitz and Karl Ludwig Diehl. It is based on the 1895 play An Ideal Husband by Oscar Wilde, a romantic comedy exploring social norms and sensitivities in the 19th century. The adaptation by Thea von Harbou is very faithful to the original work.

The film's sets were designed by the art directors Artur Günther and Benno von Arent. Interiors were shot at Terra Film's Marienfelde Studios, while extensive location shooting took place in London.

== Plot summary ==
The film revolves around Sir Robert Chiltern, a respected politician with a hidden past of corruption. When a scheming woman named Mrs. Cheveley discovers his secret, she blackmails him, forcing him to support a fraudulent government project. Sir Robert seeks help from his witty friend, Lord Arthur Goring, to navigate the moral dilemma. The film explores themes of integrity, morality, and the consequences of one's actions while maintaining Oscar Wilde's signature humor and wit.

== Main cast ==
- Brigitte Helm as Lady Gertrud Chiltern
- Sybille Schmitz as Gloria Cheveley
- Karl Ludwig Diehl as Lord Robert Chiltern
- Georg Alexander as Lord Arthur Goring
- Anni Markart as Mabel Chiltern
- Paul Henckels as Lord Caversham
- Werner Scharf as Vicomte de Nanjac
- Karl Dannemann as Parker, Oberingenieur
- Heinz Förster-Ludwig as Mason, Diener bei Chiltern
- Karl Platen as Phips, Diener bei Goring
- Erich Walter as Montfort, Sekretär bei Chiltern
- Hermann Frick as Vickers, Buchhalter
- Toni Tetzlaff as Lady Markby
- Valy Arnheim as Angestellter im Palladium
- Walter Bechmann as Butler bei Chiltern
- Hilde Maroff as Telefonistin
- Charles Willy Kayser as Chilterns Gast
- Ludwig Trautmann as Chilterns Gast

== Bibliography ==
- Hull, David Stewart (1969). Film in the Third Reich: A Study of the German Cinema, 1933–1945. University of California Press. ISBN 978-0-520-01489-3.
