= Dorothea Angermann =

1959 film

- Directed by: Robert Siodmak
- Written by: Gerhart Hauptmann (play); Herbert Reinecker
- Produced by: Utz Utermann
- Starring: Ruth Leuwerik; Bert Sotlar; Alfred Schieske
- Cinematography: Georg Krause
- Edited by: Walter Boos
- Music by: Siegfried Franz
- Production company: Divina-Film
- Distributed by: Gloria Film
- Release date: 22 January 1959
- Running time: 106 minutes
- Country: West Germany
- Language: German

Dorothea Angermann is a 1959 West German drama film directed by Robert Siodmak and starring Ruth Leuwerik, Bert Sotlar and Alfred Schieske. It was adapted from the play by Gerhart Hauptmann.

The film's sets were designed by the art director Robert Stratil.

== Plot ==
Dorothea Angermann, the daughter of a clergyman, is accused of the murder of her husband, a brutal man that she was obliged to marry because she was pregnant and he was the father of the baby.

== Cast ==
- Ruth Leuwerik as Dorothea Angermann
- Bert Sotlar as Michael Sever
- Alfred Schieske as Pastor Angermann
- Kurt Meisel as Mario Malloneck
- Edith Schultze-Westrum as Frau Lüders
- Alfred Balthoff as Weiss
- Monika John as Rosa
- Ursula Herwig as Irene
- Ernst Konstantin as Gerichtsvorsitzender
- Holger Hagen as Defense lawyer
- Heliane Bei as Wally
- Claudia Gerstäcker as Irmgard
- Wilmut Borell as Prosecutor
- Walter Sedlmayr as Willi
- Karl Lieffen

== Bibliography ==
- Alpi, Deborah Lazaroff. Robert Siodmak: A Biography. McFarland, 1998.
