= Downfall (1964 film) =

1964 British film by John Moxey

- Theatrical release poster
- Directed by: John Moxey
- Screenplay by: Robert Stewart
- Based on: a story by Edgar Wallace
- Produced by: Jack Greenwood
- Starring: Maurice Denham; Nadja Regin; T. P. McKenna
- Cinematography: James Wilson
- Edited by: Derek Holding
- Music by: Bernard Ebbinghouse
- Production company: Merton Park Studios
- Distributed by: Anglo-Amalgamated
- Release date: 16 March 1964
- Running time: 59 minutes
- Country: United Kingdom
- Language: English

Downfall is a 1964 British second feature film directed by John Moxey and starring Maurice Denham, Nadja Regin and T. P. McKenna. The screenplay was by Robert Stewart based on a story by Wallace. The film is part of the series of Edgar Wallace Mysteries films made at Merton Park Studios.

== Plot ==
Martin Somers is in court on a murder charge. He is defended by Sir Harold Crossley and acquitted, despite misgivings from his colleagues and the police. Crossley subsequently hires Somers as his chauffeur, keeping Somers' identity from his wife Suzanne, who is being unfaithful to him. Crossley wants Somers to murder his wife, but things do not go as planned.

== Cast ==
- Maurice Denham as Sir Harold Crossley
- Nadja Regin as Suzanne Crossley
- T. P. McKenna as Martin Somers
- Peter Barkworth as Tom Cotterell
- Ellen McIntosh as Jane Meldrum
- Iris Russell as Mrs. Webster
- Victor Brooks as Inspector Royd
- Ian Curry as Haldane
- John Bryans as Arlott
- Cavan Malone as driving instructor
- Anthony Ashdown as reporter
- Jon Luxton as photographer
- John Miller as Lord Hinchcliffe
- Anthony Pendrell as doctor
- G. H. Mulcaster as elderly man

== Critical reception ==
The Monthly Film Bulletin wrote: "Incredible in general outline and in its details, and with a complete lack of punch or even a good climax, this is a humdrum and routine second feature thriller. It is pleasant, though, to see Maurice Denham in a leading role once more."
