= Lidija Sotlar =

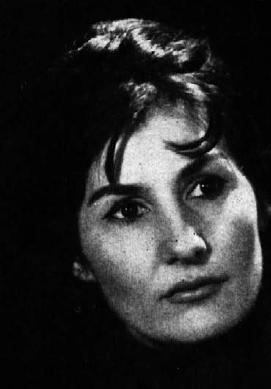
- Sotlar c. 1965
- Born: Lidija Lipovž; 12 June 1929; Kruševac, Kingdom of Serbs, Croats and Slovenes
- Died: 16 October 2018 (aged 89); Serbia
- Occupations: Ballerina; Teacher
- Years active: 1948–1983
- Spouse: Bert Sotlar (m. 1955; died 1992)
- Awards: Honorary Badge of Freedom of the Republic of Slovenia

Lidija Sotlar (née Lipovž; 12 June 1929 – 16 October 2018) was a Serbian-born Slovenian ballerina and teacher who was a member and a soloist of the Ljubljana Slovene National Theatre Opera and Ballet between 1948 and 1972, performing the role of 80 characters from a wide variety of ballet repertoire. She led the Lidija Sotlar Ballet Group which she established at the Central Ballet School in Ljubljana and passed on her knowledge of ballet to several generations of Slovenian dancers and established the Yugoslav Ballet Artists in 1977 that she led artistically and organisationally until 1983. Sotlar was a 2001 recipient of the Honorary Badge of Freedom of the Republic of Slovenia.

== Biography ==
Born Lidija Lipovž in the Serbian town of Kruševac on 12 June 1929, she is the daughter of a train driver who was moved to the town by the authorities. She was raised in the town and finished four grades of primary school and was taught Slovenian. Sotlar's family fled to Slovenia when the Second World War broke out and she continued her education in Ljubljana. She was initially educated at the gymnasium and then at the Secondary School of Economics. Sotlar became acquainted with ballet in 1942 after watching an opera-ballet performance at school and decided this would be her career. In 1944, she was one three successful applicants to join the Conservatory of Music and Ballet Ljubljana, and began performing on stage in Ljubljana during the 1945/46 season. Sotlar graduated from Lidija Wisiak's class in 1953.

From 1948 to 1972, she was a member and a soloist for the Ljubljana Slovene National Theatre Opera and Ballet, and briefly danced in Split, Croatia. Sotlar created and recreated 80 characters from a wide variety of ballet repertoire and increased the reputation of Slovenian ballet on tour in Austria, France, Italy, the Netherlands, Russia and the former Yugoslavia. The first solo role she took on was Đavolica in Đavlu u selu in 1952. Sotlar portrayed Saloma in 1954; Giselle and Myrtha Giselle at the Croatian National Theatre, Split in 1958; Zarema in Bahčisarajska fontana in 1961; Odette in Swan Lake in 1962 and Juliet in Romeo in Juliet in 1968. She also had roles as the Mistress of the Copper Mountain in The Stone Flower and as Liza in La fille mal gardée. Sotlar ended her career in ballet in 1972 because she did not want audiences to remember her for minor roles she would have performance later in her life. That year, she was featured in the short documentary film Portret Lidije Sotlarjeve by Mojca Vogelnik.

Between 1975 and 1983, she was the leader of the Lidija Sotlar Ballet Group which she established at the Central Ballet School in Ljubljana and passed on her knowledge of ballet to several generations of Slovenian dancers, some of whom went on to have solo stage careers. Sotlar established the Meeting of Yugoslav Ballet Artists in 1977 and was its artistic and organisational leader until 1983 as she organised multiple several ballet concerts in Slovenia and abroad. In 2006, she authored her autobiography Spomini balerine, which the Slovenian Chamber Music Theatre published.

== Personal life ==
She was married to the actor Bert Sotlar from 1955 to his death in 1992. Sotlar died on 16 October 2018, and was buried at Žale.

== Awards ==
In 1997, she was named the inaugural recipient of the Society of Ballet Artists of Slovenia Lidija Wisiak Award. Sotlar was decorated with the Honorary Badge of Freedom of the Republic of Slovenia in 1999 "on the occasion of the 80th anniversary of Slovenian ballet for artistic achievements and other merits in this field" by Milan Kučan, the President of Slovenia. She received a plaque from the capital city of Ljubljana in 2001 "for her artistic work, mentoring and teaching work. with young people and organizational work in ballet art in Ljubljana." In 2008, Sotlar was named a winner of the Župančič Award's (the highest recognition of the Ljubljana municipality for creations in the field of art and culture) Lifetime Achievement Award at a ceremony at the City Museum of Ljubljana. She was nominated for the Prešeren Award on multiple occasions.
