= Joyce Blair =

English actress and dancer (1932–2006)

- in the Edgar Wallace Mystery, Number Six (1962)
- Born: Joyce Ogus; 4 November 1932; London, England
- Died: 19 August 2006 (aged 73); Santa Monica, California, U.S.
- Occupations: Actress, dancer
- Years active: 1946–1991
- Spouses: Edward Lever (1956–?); Henry Sheridan-Taylor (1965–?)
- Children: 2
- Relatives: Lionel Blair (brother)

Joyce Blair (born Joyce Ogus; 4 November 1932 – 19 August 2006) was an English actress and dancer. She was the younger sister of Lionel Blair, with whom she often performed.

== Early life and education ==
Blair was born in London, as the daughter of Myer Ogus, a Lithuanian Jewish barber, and Debora "Della" Greenbaum. Her family was Jewish. Her father changed the family name to Blair in her youth; he died when Joyce was 12 years old. Blair was educated at Cone's School in London, and started her show-business career by singing and tap-dancing in front of captive audiences in London air raid shelters during the Second World War.

== Career ==
She and her brother took up showbusiness as professionals to support their mother after their father's death in 1944. She made her first professional stage appearance in the J.M. Barrie play Quality Street at the Embassy Theatre in 1945, aged 13.

She appeared in minor roles in the original London productions of South Pacific in 1951 and Guys and Dolls in 1953, and also appeared in off-Broadway musicals and pantomimes. She appeared in several films, but became well known for her appearances on television in the 1950s and 1960s, in shows such as Morecambe and Wise Show, The Benny Hill Show, The Adventures of Robin Hood, New Look, The Saint and Z-Cars.

In 1962, she released the single "Baby, It's Cold Outside", sung with Oliver Reed. In 1963, credited as "Miss X", she recorded "Christine", a tune written by John Barry (under an assumed name) and Leslie Bricusse, which was banned by the BBC at the height of the Profumo scandal but reached no.37 on the UK singles chart.

In 1978, she returned to the West End stage in Bar Mitzvah Boy and in 1984 she appeared in The Last Days of Pompeii (1984). She often appeared in dance routines with her brother Lionel until an estrangement in 1977. They did not reconcile their differences until many years later, when their mutual friend Sammy Davis Jr. was dying of cancer.

== Private life ==
Blair was married three times; first to Edward Lever in 1956; second to Henry Sheridan-Taylor; and third, briefly to an American, with whom she moved to California where she took on television work and did voice-overs. She also worked in a Santa Monica antiques shop.

She was the mother of actress Deborah Sheridan-Taylor, who played Saskia Duncan in EastEnders, and of a son, Adam, who is a photographer.

== Death ==
Blair died from cancer in Santa Monica, California, aged 73. She was survived by her brother Lionel and her two children.

== Selected filmography ==
- The Trojan Brothers (1946)
- Yield to the Night (1956)
- Jazz Boat (1960)
- Crooks Anonymous (1962)
- Number Six (1962)
- I've Gotta Horse (with Billy Fury 1964)
- The Wild Affair (1964)
- Be My Guest (1965)
- Mister Ten Per Cent (1967)
- Intimate Games (1976)
- The Last Days of Pompeii (1984)

== Discography ==
- 1963 – “Christine” / “S-E-X” (Ember Records, 7") as Miss X – UK No. 37
