= Jimmy Hawkins =

American former actor, producer and writer (born 1941)

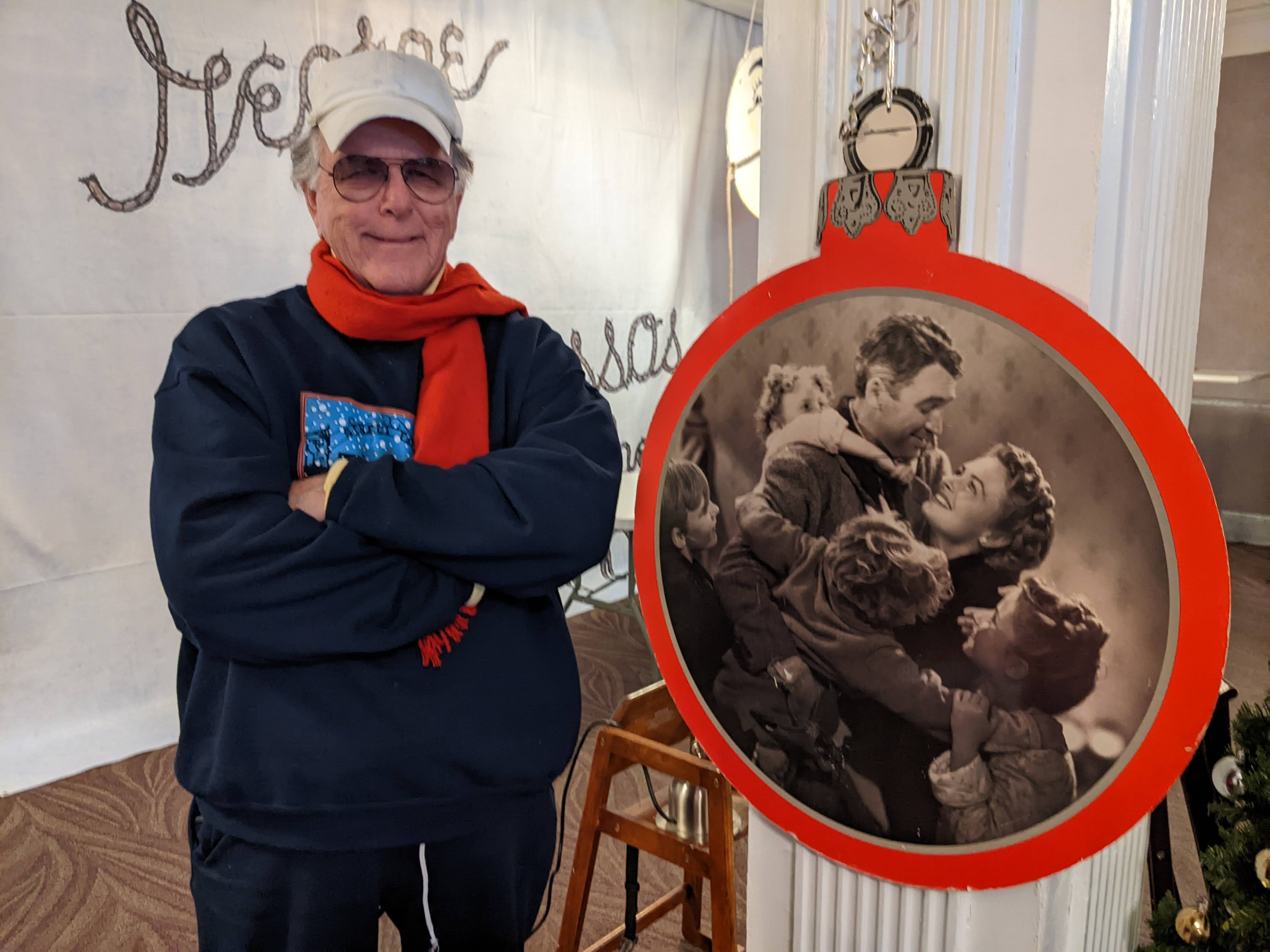
- Hawkins in 2021 at the 75th anniversary festival for It's a Wonderful Life in Seneca Falls, NY.
- Born: November 13, 1941 (age 84); Los Angeles, California
- Occupations: Actor; producer; director
- Known for: It's a Wonderful Life

Jimmy Hawkins (born November 13, 1941) is an American former actor, producer and writer. He is best-known for his TV roles in shows like Annie Oakley, The Adventures of Ozzie and Harriet, Leave It to Beaver, Petticoat Junction, and The Donna Reed Show; and as Tommy Bailey, son of George Bailey in the 1946 film It's a Wonderful Life.

== Early life ==
Born on November 13, 1941 in Los Angeles, California, Hawkins was the middle child of three born to Elizabeth K., née Unholz, and Thomas J. Hawkins, and the grandson of German-born prizefighter and onetime Keystone Cop, Rudy Unholz. Each of Hawkins' siblings—Thomas Jr., the eldest, and Susan, the youngest—was also a child actor of film and/or television, the former billed as either Tim, Timmy, or Timmie, and the latter as either Susan or Susie. Hawkins attended Notre Dame High School in Sherman Oaks, California, participating in sports activities, and he was a leader of the Junior Achievement group in Burbank.

In addition to Hawkins's acting, he made personal appearances that featured his roping and trick riding.

== Personal life ==
Hawkins is the author of five books about the film It's a Wonderful Life, served on The Jimmy Stewart Museum Advisory Board, and for 20 years served on the board of directors of the Donna Reed Foundation for the Performing Arts.

In celebration of the Frank Capra film, Hawkins and other cast members appear annually at the "It's A Wonderful Life Festival" in Seneca Falls, New York, the town thought to be the inspiration for the movie's setting of Bedford Falls.

== Filmography (selection) ==
- It's a Wonderful Life (1946) as Tommy Bailey
- The Ruggles (1949–1952) (TV series, 137 episodes) as Donald Ruggles
- Annie Oakley (1954–1957) (TV series, 81 episodes) as Tagg Oakley
- Dennis The Menace (1961) (TV series) (Season 2 Episode 33: "Dennis' Newspaper") as Chuck Long
- Leave It to Beaver (1961) (TV series) (Season 4 Episode 25: "Wally and Dudley") as Dudley McMillan
- Bringing Up Buddy (1961) (TV series, 3 episodes)
  - (Season 1 Episode 17: "The Education of Nicky Marlo") as Fennimore
  - (Season 1 Episode 24: "Buddy and Fennimore") as Fennimore Cooper
  - (Season 1 Episode 34: "Buddy and the Teenager")
- Ichabod and Me (1961–1962) (TV series, 11 episodes) as Jonathan Baylor
- Zotz! (1962) as Jimmy Kellgore
- Alfred Hitchcock Presents (1962) (Season 7 Episode 15: "The Door Without a Key") as Dewey Sims
- My Three Sons (1963) (TV series)
  - (Season 3 Episode 26: "High on the Hog") as George
  - (Season 4 Episode 4: "Dear Robbie") as John Carter
- The Adventures of Ozzie and Harriet (1962–1964) (TV series, 6 episodes) as Jimmy
- The Fugitive (1963) (TV series) (Season 1 Episode 8: "See Hollywood and Die") as Carl Emery
- Girl Happy (1965) as Doc
- The Donna Reed Show (1958–1965) (TV series, 20 episodes)
- Petticoat Junction (1963–1967) (TV series, 9 episodes)
- Spinout (1966) as Larry
- Gidget (1966) (TV series) (Season 1 Episode 19: "Gidget's Career") as Paul
