= The House on the Coast =

- Directed by: Boško Kosanović
- Written by: Boško Kosanović; Norbert Kunze; Ernst Roberts; Meša Selimović
- Starring: René Deltgen; Bert Sotlar; Nadja Regin; Sybille Schmitz
- Cinematography: Walter Partsch
- Edited by: Ružica Cvingl
- Music by: Bojan Adamič
- Production companies: Bosna Film; J.A. Hamburg
- Distributed by: J. Arthur Rank Film
- Release date: 22 January 1954
- Running time: 97 minutes
- Countries: Austria; West Germany; Yugoslavia
- Language: German

The House on the Coast (German: Das Haus an der Küste, Serbo-Croatian: Kuća na obali / Кућа на обали) is a 1954 drama film directed by Boško Kosanović and starring René Deltgen, Bert Sotlar, Nadja Regin and Sybille Schmitz. It was made as a co-production between Austria, West Germany and Yugoslavia. The film was distributed by the German branch of the Rank Organisation.

It was Schmitz's final film before her suicide the following year.

== Cast ==
- René Deltgen as Beppo
- Bert Sotlar as Dr. Branko Ilić
- Nadja Regin as Marina
- Sybille Schmitz as Anna
- Manfred Inger as Vjeko
- Eva Palmer as Davorka
- Milan Skrbinšek as Kaaapitän
- Josip Zappalorto as Ante
- Božidar Drnić as Staatsanwalt
- Bogdan Bogdanović as Bezirkshauptmann
- Blažo Nikolić as Bootsverkäufer
- Vasa Pantelić as Protokoll-Beamter
- Branko Stanković as Stjepo
- Lino Sapro as Chefarzt
- Mileva Zakrajšek as Haushälterin
- Milan Rajaković as Gefängnisbeamter

== Bibliography ==
- Friedemann Beyer. Schöner als der Tod: das Leben der Sybille Schmitz. Belleville, 1998.
