= Milka Bajić Poderegin =

- Милки Бајић-Подерегин
- Born: August 28, 1904; Pljevlja
- Died: March 8, 1971 (aged 66)
- Resting place: Monastery of the Holy Trinity of Pljevlja
- Occupation: Novelist
- Children: Nadja Regin

Milka Bajić Poderegin (August 28, 1904 – March 8, 1971) was the first female novelist from Montenegro. Her novel The Dawning (Montenegrin: Свитање, romanized: Svitanje) was published posthumously in 1987.

Milka Bajić was born on August 28, 1904 in Pljevlja into a wealthy merchant family. She was educated at the Pljevlja Gymnasium and graduated from the Faculty of Philosophy, University of Belgrade in 1928.

She worked as a teacher of literature in Pljevlja, where she met her husband, a fellow teacher and Russian immigrant, Ignatij Poderegin. The Podergrins had two children, Jelena and Nadežda. Nadežda became a film actress under the name Nadja Regin. The Poderegin worked as teachers in Prokuplje and Kraljevo. Ignatij Poderegin and his students were among the thousands killed by the German army in the Kraljevo massacre of October 1941. Milka Bajić Poderegin moved to Požarevac and worked with the Yugoslav Partisans. Following World War II, Poderegin taught literature in Belgrade until her 1955 retirement, then she moved to London.

Svitanje is a story of women and families in Pljevlja from the mid-19th century to World War I. It begins with Savka, a fifteen year old woman who is married to a much older man, Tane, and then quickly becomes a widow. The characters contend with Austrian and Ottoman occupation and the beginning of the war, ending with the Allied liberation of Pljevlja in 1918. The focus is not on political events, however, but household ones, marriages, cultural practices, and foodways. Svitanje was the first in a planned trilogy that would take events in the story up to World War II. It was unfinished at the time of her death, and her daughter Nadja Regin completed the manuscript based on her mother's notes. The book was published in Serbo-Croatian in 1987 and the English translation was published in 1988 by Honeyglen, a publishing company founded by Nadja and her sister Jelena. Nadja Regin called completing and publishing her mother's book "the biggest thing I have ever achieved".

== Bibliography ==
- Svitanje. Belgrade. Jugoslaviapublik. 1987.
- The Dawning. Nadja Poderegin, tr. London. Honeyglen. 1988.
