= Margaret Kerry =

American actress and radio host (1929–2026)

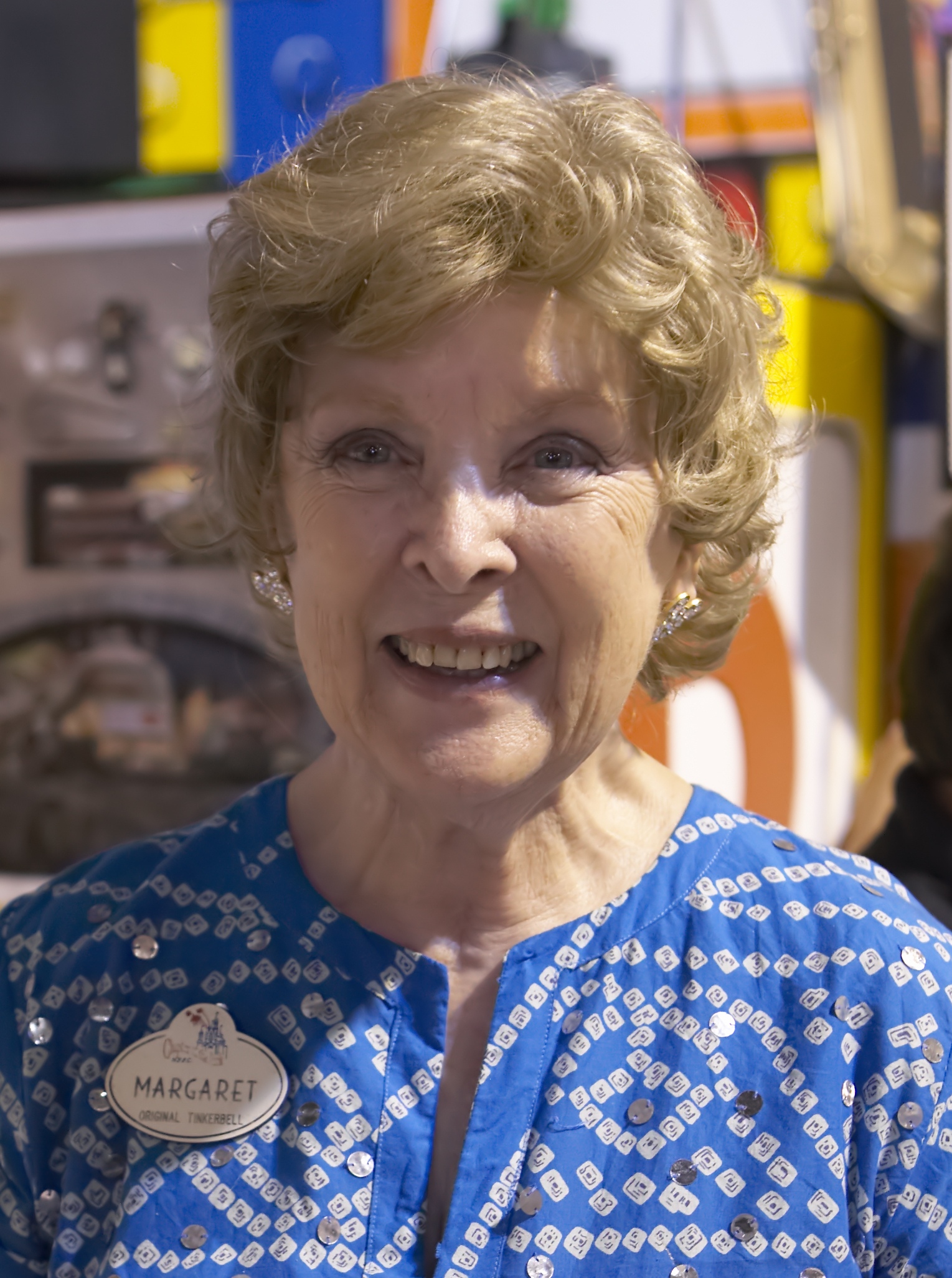
- Kerry in 2007
- Born: Margaret McCarty; May 11, 1929; Springfield, Illinois, U.S.
- Died: June 11, 2026 (aged 97); Wilmington, North Carolina, U.S.
- Occupations: Actress; voice artist; radio producer, director, and host; media personality
- Years active: 1933–1953, 1993, 2020–2026
- Spouses: Dick Brown (m. 1951; div. 1984) John H. Willcox (m. 1987; died 1999) Robert Boeke (m. 2020; died 2026)
- Children: 3
- Website: Margaret Kerry official website

Signature
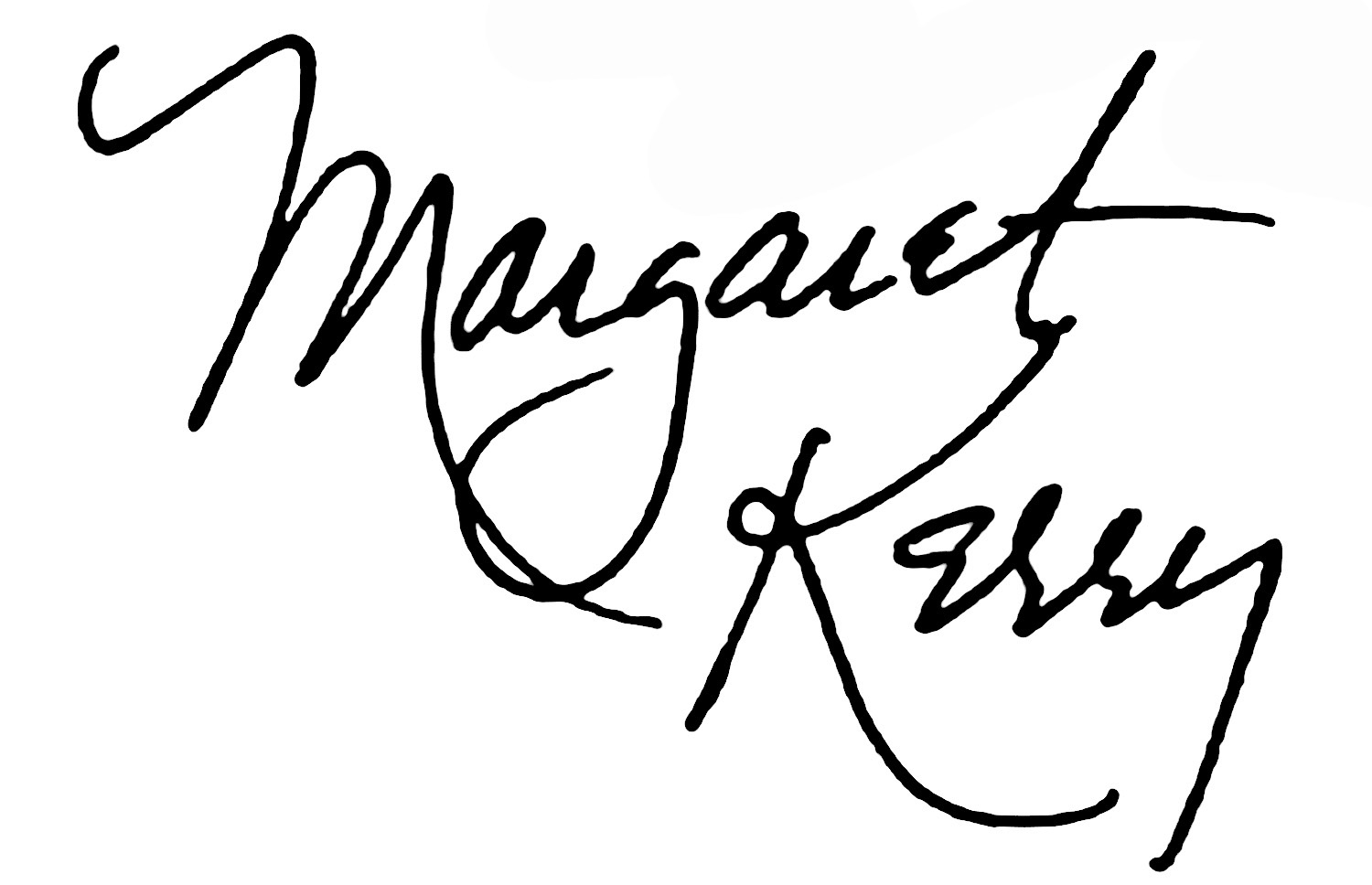

Margaret Kerry (born Margaret McCarty, later changed to Peggy Lynch; May 11, 1929 – June 11, 2026) was an American screen actress, dancer, voice artist, camera double, radio producer, director, host and media personality, best known for her work as a model for Walt Disney Pictures, where she served as the inspiration for the Peter Pan character of Tinker Bell, which she also pantomimed.

== Early life ==
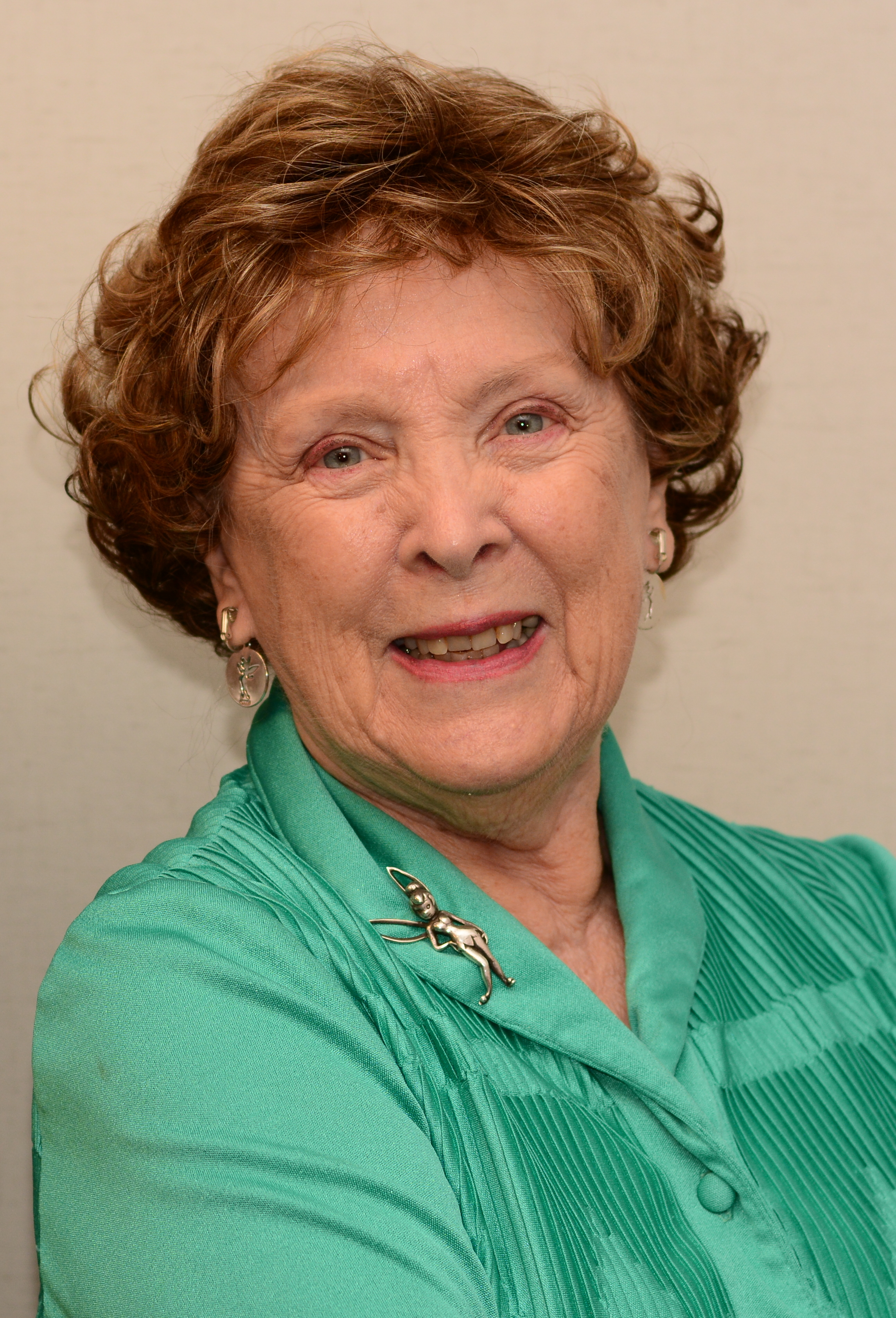
Kerry in 2013

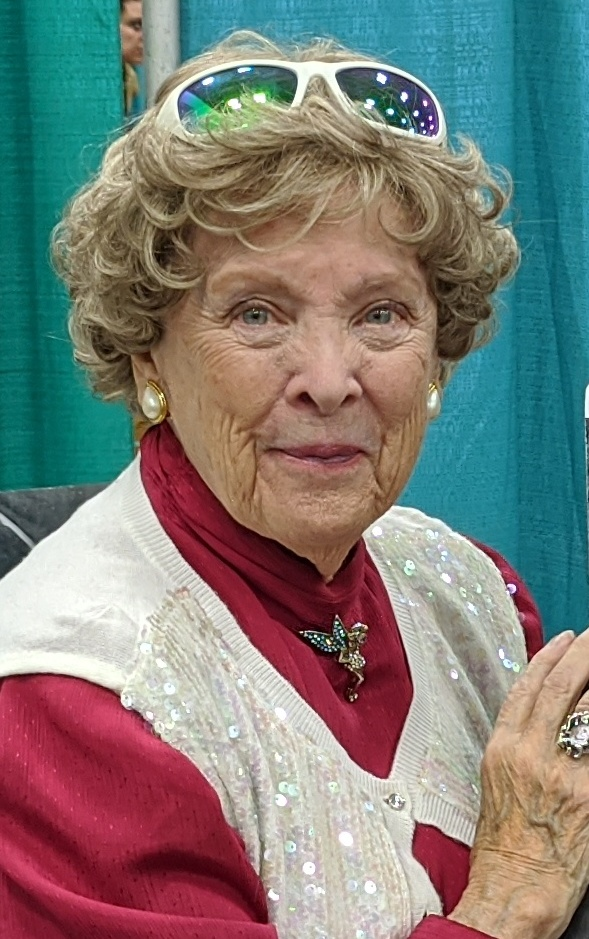
Kerry in 2019

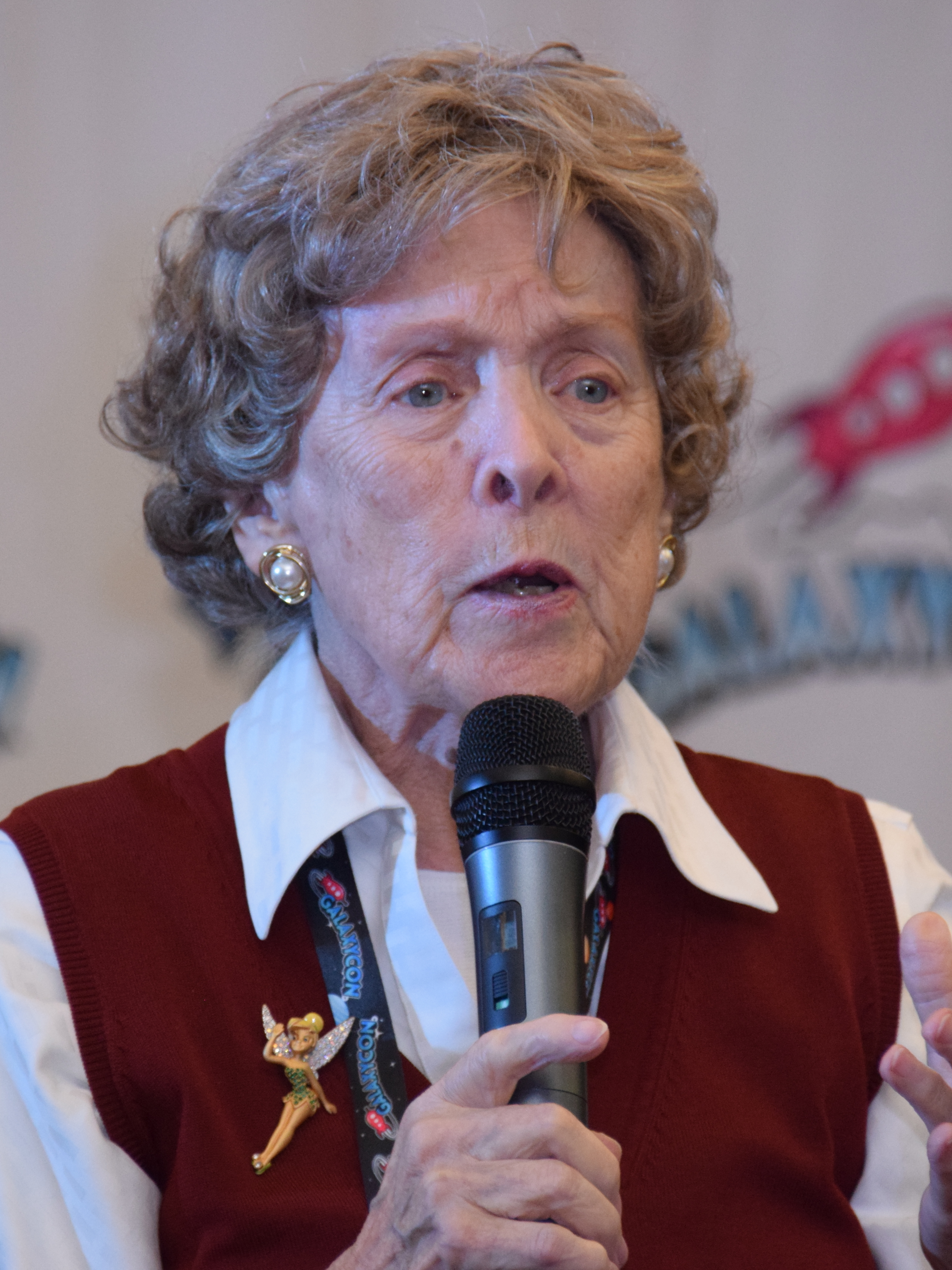
Kerry at Galaxycon in Richmond, Virginia in 2022

Born as Margaret McCarty on May 11, 1929, in Springfield, Illinois, she was adopted at three years old and moved to Los Angeles. Her adoptive parents later had her name legally changed to Peggy Lynch Her first role was as a fairy in the 1935 film A Midsummer Night's Dream directed by Max Reinhardt. She worked under her real name as a dancer and actor in three of the Our Gang comedy shorts.

Kerry served as a camera double for Elizabeth Taylor in the film National Velvet at MGM. She attracted the attention of Eddie Cantor, who cast her in the role of his teenage daughter in the film If You Knew Susie. Cantor thought Lynch needed a more theatrical-sounding name to be more noticeable as an actor, so she officially became Margaret Kerry. She graduated from high school with honors while working on the film and would later graduate cum laude from Los Angeles City College.

== Career ==
=== Television work/voice artistry ===
Kerry as a teenager played the role of Sharon in the first network sitcom, The Ruggles, on ABC-TV. The show's farewell episode at the end of its three-year run featured Sharon's wedding and honeymoon. Kerry also appeared in two episodes of The Andy Griffith Show, and in 1950 as Jane Carter in The Squire episode of The Lone Ranger. A voiceover performer with twenty-one dialects and forty-eight character voices, Kerry provided voices on 52 episodes of the groundbreaking children's television show, Clutch Cargo, including characters Paddlefoot and Spinner. She provided numerous voices and live-action lead-ins for The New Three Stooges and Space Angel animated series for Cambria Productions.

=== Work with Disney ===
Kerry answered an audition call during the planning stages of the animated feature film Peter Pan. The audition, supervised by animator Marc Davis, required her to pantomime the motions that would be used as live-action reference for the animation of Tinker Bell. As Tinker Bell was to be non verbal, her movements would be integral, and Davis sought a dancer that could help embody the character. Kerry won the part and spent six months at the Disney Studios on a mostly empty sound stage pantomiming the part. The studios provided props, notably a giant keyhole mounted on a stand as well as a pair of giant scissors, used in the scene where Tinker Bell became trapped in a jewelry box. Kerry also provided the voice and reference movements of the red-haired mermaid in the Neverland lagoon scene.

=== Radio ===
Kerry was a producer, writer, and host of What's Up Weekly - Ministry Loves Company on KKLA-FM, Los Angeles, a Christian radio station, from 1992 to 2004. Also serving as the station's community services director, she headed an outreach program that connected to more than 200 non-profit service agencies. Kerry was a certified seminar leader by the American Seminar Leaders Association and co-author and facilitator of the FUNdamentals of Speaking Seminars. She continued to meet fans and attended many conventions, events, and seminars throughout the United States. As a supporter and contributor within the animation community, Kerry served as a board member of ASIFA-Hollywood for a number of years.

=== Books ===
Kerry published her autobiography in 2016, Tinker Bell Talks: Tales of a Pixie Dusted Life (ISBN 978-1533500755) with stories and anecdotes from her life and career, and featuring 180 photos and pieces of art. In 2019, Kerry self-published a booklet They All Look Alike To Me with short stories detailing her having prosopagnosia, also known as "face blindness".

== Personal life and death ==
Kerry was married three times. She was married to Dick Brown from 1951 to 1984. They have three children:Ellen Seibel: Married to Joel Seibel, an Emmy Award-winning animation producer. Christina "Chris" McCarty and Eric Norquist. She married John Wilcox from 1987 to his death in 1999. In 2019, she reconnected after 70 years with her former boyfriend, 94-year-old WWII veteran Robert Boeke. Boeke had passed a store called Tinker Bell Toys while visiting Europe for D-day's 75th anniversary, and told his friend he had always loved Tinker Bell; his friend found Kerry's email address. They were married on Valentine's Day 2020 in a ceremony at the Little Brown Church in the Valley in Studio City, California.

Kerry suffered from prosopagnosia and wrote and spoke publicly about coping with the cognitive disorder.

Kerry died from lung cancer in Wilmington, North Carolina, on June 11, 2026, at the age of 97. Her husband Robert Boeke died less than three weeks earlier, on May 24, at the age of 100.

== Awards and honors ==
In 2012, Kerry was the recipient of the Disneyana Fan Club President's award. In 2019, on the occasion of her 90th birthday, Kerry was honored with certificates by Los Angeles Mayor Eric Garcetti on behalf of the City of Los Angeles; the Los Angeles City Council; and the Los Angeles County Board of Supervisors via 5th District Supervisor Kathryn Barger. Kerry also received a card from the First Lady of the United States, Melania Trump, who noted Kerry's life as "an important part of the American story and the history of Cinema and Entertainment." On February 15, 2020, Kerry was honored with the Disneyana Fan Club Legends award. On February 16, 2020, Kerry was presented with the Ward Kimball award by the board of Walt Disney's Carolwood Barn. In 2023, in celebration of the 100th anniversary of the Walt Disney Company, Kerry's original Tinker Bell ballet slippers were put on display at the Walt Disney Family Museum in San Francisco, commemorating her portrayal of the fairy character.

== Partial filmography ==
Year	Title	Role	Notes
1935	A Midsummer Night's Dream	Fairy	as Peggy Lynch
1935	Teacher's Beau	Student	Short film
1936	The Pinch Singer	Call-in voter	Short film
1938	The Adventures of Tom Sawyer	Schoolgirl	Uncredited
1938	Aladdin's Lantern	Tap Dancer	Uncredited
1948	If You Knew Susie	Marjorie Parker	
1948	Canon City	Maxine Smith	
1949	The Sickle or the Cross	Betty Deems	
1953	Peter Pan	Mermaid	voice, uncredited
1993	Public Access	Marge	
2020	Before There Were Rings	Nana	Short film
