= It Had to Be You (1947 film) =

1947 film by Don Hartman, Rudolph Maté

- Directed by: Don Hartman; Rudolph Maté
- Screenplay by: Melvin Frank; Norman Panama
- Story by: Allen Boretz; Don Hartman
- Produced by: Don Hartman
- Starring: Ginger Rogers; Cornel Wilde; Ron Randell
- Cinematography: Vincent J. Farrar; Rudolph Maté
- Edited by: Gene Havlick
- Music by: Arthur Morton; Heinz Roemheld
- Production company: Columbia Pictures
- Distributed by: Columbia Pictures
- Release date: December 1947
- Running time: 98 minutes
- Country: United States
- Language: English
- Box office: $1.5 million (US rentals)

It Had to Be You is a 1947 American comedy romance film directed by Don Hartman and Rudolph Maté and starring Ginger Rogers and Cornel Wilde. It was produced and distributed by Columbia Pictures. A marriage-shy sculptor meets the boy of her childhood dreams, now a firefighter.

== Plot ==
Victoria Stafford is a wealthy woman who has been engaged three times, and each time has backed out at the altar.

On a train she meets the vision George McKesson dressed as an Indian, just like she envisioned her dream man when she was a child. He claims that he is a figment of her imagination and will disappear as soon as she stops thinking about him. He follows her home and causes much confusion within her family.

Determined to wed her fourth fiancé, Oliver H.P. Harrington, Victoria is on the verge of saying "yes" when she meets the real version of her "dream lover," Johnny Blaine, a firefighter who is the physical incarnation of George McKesson. Victoria, frustrated with George's advances, insists he stay at home to play cards with her father, and while shopping she sees Johnny returning a negligee. Thinking he is "George," Victoria has him thrown out of the store for stalking her.

While watching her father's home movies, Victoria remembers kissing Johnny when he was a boy dressed in an Indian costume, and at the insistence of George, tracks Johnny down at the fire station where he works. Victoria boldly approaches Johnny and is persistent in her pursuit of him and his affection. It turns out he too has backed out three times at the altar, claiming it never felt right. Victoria is excited to discover that they have a lot in common, including a knowledge of baseball, favourite foods, and a love of the movie's title song, but Johnny isn't easily swayed by Victoria's eagerness to become a couple, and insists on doing things his way. He is initially not impressed with her brash behaviour, but soon starts to see things her way.

In the meantime, fiancé Oliver has a conversation with George, who alludes to the scandal of Victoria, having traveled with an Indian on a train. He gives Oliver the phone number of the conductor who witnessed the whole train adventure. Oliver, desperate to find out the truth, tracks down the train conductor, then calls off the wedding.

After spending several days together, Victoria convinces Johnny that they have subconsciously been in love since they were kids and that they are made for each other. He decides to marry her but wants to speak to her father first. Because the family thinks he is George, they dismiss his claims to be Johnny Blaine the firefighter, and alluding to the "train incident" Mr. an Mrs. Stafford discuss getting Victoria married off as soon as possible to avoid future scandal. Thinking that the whole family is nuts, and concerned about her train adventure with another man, Johnny leaves.

Oliver's father, Mr. Harrington insists that Oliver marry Victoria in order to gain access to her family's money; Otherwise they will be in financial ruin, to the tune of three million dollars. So the wedding of Oliver and Victoria is on again at the insistence of both families, and they are about to marry when the vision of George McKesson shows up at the wedding, dressed as an Indian.

Knowing Victoria is marrying the wrong man, George places a call to report a fire at the wedding. This brings the real dream man, Johnny, to the Stafford home. The fire crew enter just as Victoria is deliberating whether or not to say "I do." Johnny carries a very willing Victoria over his shoulder and they leave the house. The movie ends with a tight shot of Johnny's moccasins hanging from his belt as the couple kiss on the speeding firetruck.

== Cast ==
- Ginger Rogers as Victoria Stafford
- Cornel Wilde as George McKesson/Johnny Blaine
- Ron Randell as Oliver H.P. Harrington
- Percy Waram as Mr. Stafford
- Spring Byington as Mrs. Stafford
- Thurston Hall as Mr. Harrington
- Charles Evans as Dr. Parkinson
- Carol Nugent as Victoria at age 6 (uncredited)
- Judy Nugent as Victoria at age 5 (uncredited)
- Billy Bevan as Evans, the Butler
- Frank Orth as Train Conductor Brown
- Anna Q. Nilsson as Saleslady

== Production ==
In April 1947 Columbia announced that Ginger Rogers would star in the movie then called I Found a Dream. The studio broke with convention and had two men direct.

In her autobiography Ginger: My Story, Rogers wrote about the film: "[It was] a very amusing script about a girl who backs out of four marriages. In the end she finds the answer to her dreams and the reason for her vacillation. The 'answer' was played by Cornel Wilde, who usually appeared in robust adventure roles. I must say, he marched into the picture as though he had done farce all his life. Spring Byington played my mother..., and I got to act for a few moments with Anna Q. Nilsson."

It was an early role for Australian actor Ron Randell, who had recently been put under contract to Columbia. He was cast in April 1947 and filming started in May.

== Track listing ==
- It Had to Be You
  - Music by Isham Jones
- Wedding March
  - Music by Felix Mendelssohn-Bartholdy
- Bridal Chorus
  - Music by Richard Wagner
