= Order of Freedom of the Republic of Slovenia =

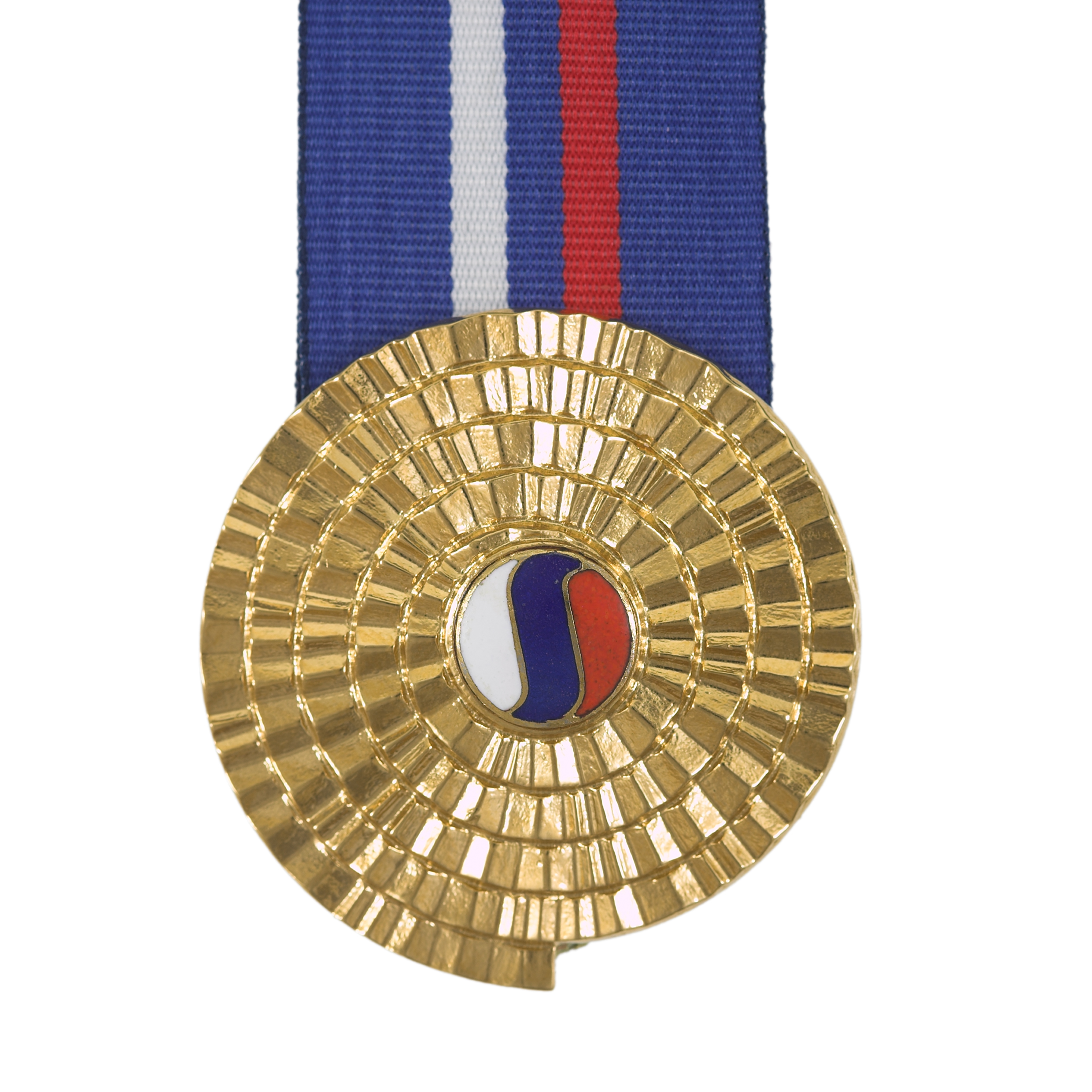
- Gold Order of Freedom

Awarded by President of Slovenia
- Type: Order of merit
- Established: 1992
- Awarded for: Services rendered in the defence of freedom and the assertion of the sovereignty of the Republic of Slovenia
- Status: Currently awarded
- Grades: Gold Medal; Silver Medal; Medal of Honour
- Ribbon of the order

Ribbon bar of the pin

The Order of Freedom of the Republic of Slovenia (Slovene: Častni znak svobode Republike Slovenije) is the highest state decoration of Slovenia.

It is awarded by President of Slovenia. It was established in 1992. The Order act was amended in 2004 and limited its purpose to the following clause: "for services rendered in the defence of freedom and the assertion of the sovereignty of the Republic of Slovenia".

There are three degrees in the Order of Freedom:

- The Gold Order of Freedom (Slovene: Zlati častni znak svobode RS) is symbolised with a medal on a necklace. The medal is a gold version of the Order of Freedom medallion, on a blue ribbon necklace with tricolor stripes. The bar pin is also gold.
- The Silver Order of Freedom (Slovene: Srebrni častni znak svobode RS) is symbolised the same way as the Order of Freedom, but the medallion and bar pins are silver.
- The Order of Freedom (Slovene: Častni znak svobode RS) is symbolised by a small crystal medallion with a center medal in the tricolors of the Slovenian flag. Recipients also receive an aluminum bar pin with the Slovenian tricolors in the center.
