= Sybille Schmitz =

German actress

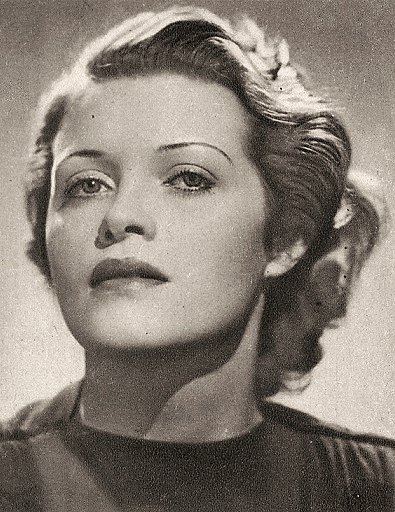
- Sybille Schmitz c. 1930
- Born: Sybille Maria Christina Schmitz; 2 December 1909; Düren, Kingdom of Prussia, German Empire
- Died: 13 April 1955 (aged 45); Munich, Bavaria, West Germany
- Occupation: Actress
- Spouse: Harald G. Petersson

Sybille Maria Christina Schmitz (2 December 1909 – 13 April 1955) was a German actress.

== Biography ==
Schmitz attended an acting school in Cologne and got her first engagement at Max Reinhardt's Deutsches Theater in Berlin in 1927. Only one year later, she made her film debut with Freie Fahrt (1928), which attracted her first attention from the critics. Her other early movies include Pabst's Diary of a Lost Girl (1929), Dreyer's Vampyr (1932), and eventually F.P.1 (1932), where she played her first leading role.

Schmitz established herself as a prominent actress in the German cinema with the films which followed including Der Herr der Welt (1934), Abschiedswalzer (1934), Ein idealer Gatte (1935), and Fährmann Maria (1936). She also had roles in Die Umwege des schönen Karl (1937), Dance on the Volcano (1938), Die Frau ohne Vergangenheit (1939), Trenck, der Pandur (1940) and Titanic (1943). Schmitz's career remained strong even though she was never officially endorsed by the Reichsfilmkammer and had a strained relationship with Joseph Goebbels. However, her explicitly non-Aryan appearance relegated her mostly to femme-fatales or problematic foreign women.

After World War II, Schmitz was shunned by the German film community for continuously working during the Third Reich, and it became difficult for her to land roles. She appeared in supporting roles in such movies as Zwischen gestern und morgen (1947), Sensation in Savoy (1950), and Illusion in a Minor Key (1952), but was beset with alcoholism, drug abuse, depression, several suicide attempts and committal to a psychiatric clinic. Her self-destructive behavior and numerous affairs with both men and women further alienated Schmitz from the film industry and her husband, screenwriter Harald G. Petersson.

Coincidentally, the last film she made less than two years before taking her own life (1953's The House on the Coast, now considered a lost film) had Schmitz's character committing suicide as a last act of desperation. A much earlier film, Frank Wisbar's The Unknown (1936) ends with the suicide of Schmitz's character, also in a final act of desperate hopelessness.

=== Death ===
On 13 April 1955, Schmitz died by suicide with an overdose of sleeping pills; she was 45 years old. At the time of her death, she had been living in Munich with a woman named Ursula Moritz, a physician who allegedly sold her morphine at an inflated rate and kept Schmitz doped up while squandering the little funds she had available to her. Schmitz's family claimed that once the actress proved to be of no more use to Moritz, the physician facilitated her suicide. One year after Schmitz's death, charges were filed against Dr. Moritz for improper medical treatment. Moritz was charged for the improper medical treatment and taking financial advantage of Schmitz and spent 4 months in jail.

== Legacy ==
Schmitz's final years were used as the basis for Rainer Werner Fassbinder's 1982 movie Die Sehnsucht der Veronika Voss. In 2000, she was the topic of a documentary titled Tanz mit dem Tod: Der Ufa-Star Sybille Schmitz (English: Dance with Death: The Ufa Star Sybille Schmitz), written and directed by Achim Podak.

Both the documentary and the Fassbinder film are available on the Criterion DVD release of Veronika Voss. A ghostly vampire featured in one of the Vampire Hunter D novels is named Sybille Schmitz, a reference to Schmitz's role in Vampyr.

== Partial filmography ==
- Polizeibericht Überfall (1928, Short) - Prostitute
- Tagebuch einer Verlorenen (English title: Diary of a Lost Girl) (1929) - Elisabeth
- Vampyr (1932) - Léone
- F.P.1 (1932) - Claire Lennartz
- Rivals of the Air (1933) - Sportfliegerin Lisa Holm
- Music in the Blood (1934) - Carola, seine Nichte
- Master of the World (1934) - Vilma, seine Frau
- Farewell Waltz (1934) - George Sand
- Sergeant Schwenke (1935) - Erna Zuwade, Stütze bei Wenkstern
- Punks Arrives from America (1935) - Britta Geistenberg
- Stradivari (1935) - Maria Belloni
- An Ideal Husband (1935) - Gloria Cheveley
- If It Were Not for Music (1935) - Ilonka Badacz
- I Was Jack Mortimer (1935) - Winifred Montemayor, Pedro's wife
- Fährmann Maria (1936) - Maria
- The Emperor's Candlesticks (1936) - Anna Demidow
- The Unknown (1936) - Madeleine
- The Chief Witness (1937) - Jelena Rakowska
- Signal in the Night (1937) - Brigitte von Schachen
- Dance on the Volcano (1938) - Gräfin Heloise Cambouilly
- The Roundabouts of Handsome Karl (1938) - Lu Donon - Tochter
- The Stars Shine (1938) - Herself
- Hotel Sacher (1939) - Nadja Woroneff
- Woman Without a Past (1939) - Eva
- Die fremde Frau (1939)
- Trenck the Pandur (1940) - Prinzessin (princess) Deinhardstein
- Clarissa (1941) - Clarissa von Reckwitz
- Lightning Around Barbara (1941) - Barbara Stammer
- Vom Schicksal verweht (1942) - Dr. Virginia Larsen
- Titanic (1943) - Sigrid Olinsky
- The Impostor (1944) - Thea Varèn
- Life Calls (1944) - Hella Warkentin
- Between Yesterday and Tomorrow (1947) - Nelly Dreifuss
- The Last Night (1949) - Renée Meurier
- The Lie (1950) - Susanne, seine Tochter
- Der Fall Rabanser (1950)
- Sensation in Savoy (1950) - Vera Gordon
- Crown Jewels (1950) - Eva Skeravenen
- Illusion in a Minor Key (1952) - Maria Alsbacher
- The House on the Coast (1954) - Anna

== Literature ==
- Brigitte Tast, Hans-Jürgen Tast: Dem Licht, dem Schatten so nah. Aus dem Leben der Sybille Schmitz, Kulleraugen – Visuelle Kommunikation Nr. 46, Schellerten 2015, ISBN 978-3888420467
