= The Ruggles =

1949 television series

- Starring: Charlie Ruggles; Irene Tedrow (1949); Erin O'Brien-Moore (1950–52); Tom Bernard; Margaret Kerry; Judy Nugent; Jimmy Hawkins
- Country of origin: United States
- No. of episodes: unknown

Production
- Running time: 25 minutes

Original release
- Network: ABC
- Release: October 23, 1949 – June 19, 1952

The Ruggles is an early American family-oriented sitcom television series broadcast live on ABC. Episodes were recorded on kinescope, and some of them survive in the UCLA Film and Television Archive. The series began October 23, 1949 — a couple of weeks after the radio hit The Life of Riley had moved to television on NBC — and ended on June 19, 1952. The Ruggles was also one of the first shows to originate from Hollywood rather than New York City, where most radio programs had been produced. It aired in New York City via kinescope beginning November 3, 1949.

== Cast and changes ==
The star of the series is comedian Charlie Ruggles, playing a character with the same name. His wife, Margaret Ruggles, was played in the first season by Irene Tedrow, thereafter by Erin O'Brien-Moore. The television family also had four children: college student Sharon Ruggles (Margaret Kerry), high school student Chuck Ruggles (Tom Bernard), and the young twins, Donna and Donald, played by Judy Nugent and Jimmy Hawkins. During the second season (1950–51), Lonnie Burr played an occasional recurring character named Oliver Quimby, a know-it-all neighbor kid.

== Synopsis ==
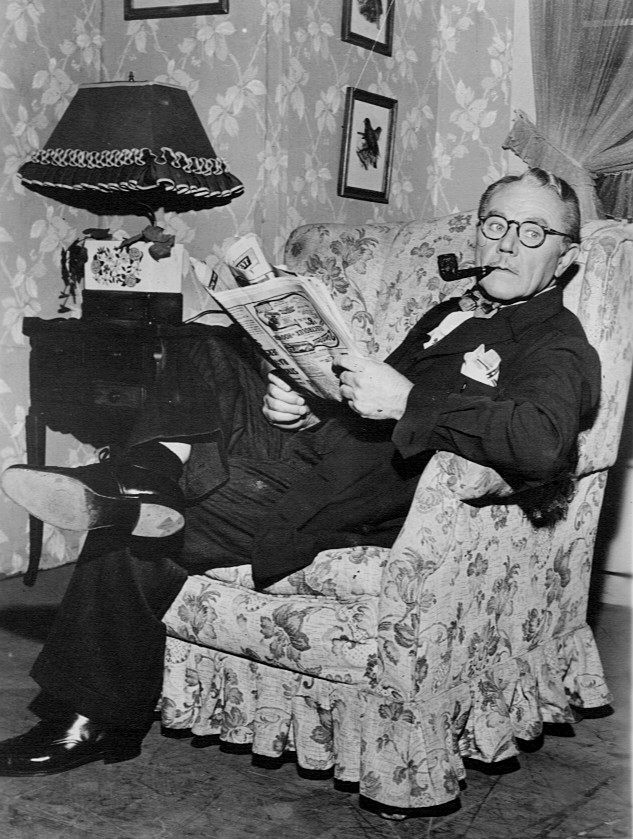
Ruggles in a scene from the program (1951)

Charlie Ruggles is a department manager for a company. His boss, Mr. Williams, and his secretary Miss Peabody were seldom seen, and the exact nature of the firm's business was never clearly stated. His wife Margaret kept house, while their daughter Sharon attended UCLA, though she lived at home. Son Chuck was in high school, and the twins were in elementary school.

Most shows take place with just the family members in attendance. Because the shows were broadcast live, the set had to be large and elaborate. There was no audience on the set and no laugh track. The recorded theme music was played for entrances and exits. The final episode of the show, broadcast June 19, 1952, featured the wedding of Sharon Ruggles.
