= Courtempierre =

- Commune
- Coat of arms
- Location of Courtempierre
- Location within France Location within Centre-Val de Loire
- Coordinates: 48°06′13″N 2°36′54″E
- Country: France
- Region: Centre-Val de Loire
- Department: Loiret
- Arrondissement: Montargis
- Canton: Courtenay
- Intercommunality: CC des Quatre Vallées

Government
  - Mayor (2024–2026): Malika Vollette
- Area^{1}: 13.30 km^{2} (5.14 sq mi)
- Highest elevation: 98 m (322 ft)
- Lowest elevation: 77 m (253 ft)
- Population (2023): 210
  - Density: 16/km^{2} (41/sq mi)
- Demonym: Courtempierrois
- Time zone: UTC+01:00 (CET)
  - Summer (DST): UTC+02:00 (CEST)
- INSEE/Postal code: 45114 /45490
- ^{1} French Land Register data, which excludes lakes, ponds, glaciers > 1 km^{2} (0.386 sq mi or 247 acres) and river estuaries.

Courtempierre (French pronunciation: [kuʁtɑ̃pjɛʁ]) is a commune in the Loiret department in north-central France.

== See also ==
- Communes of the Loiret department
