= Ma and Pa Kettle at Home =

1954 film by Charles Lamont

- Film poster by Reynold Brown
- Directed by: Charles Lamont
- Written by: Kay Lenard
- Based on: The Egg and I 1945 novel by Betty MacDonald
- Produced by: Richard Wilson
- Starring: Marjorie Main; Percy Kilbride; Alan Mowbray
- Cinematography: Carl E. Guthrie
- Edited by: Leonard Weiner
- Music by: Joseph Gershenson
- Production company: Universal Pictures
- Distributed by: Universal Pictures
- Release date: March 10, 1954
- Running time: 80 minutes
- Country: United States
- Language: English
- Box office: $1.75 million (US and Canada rental)

Ma and Pa Kettle at Home is a 1954 American comedy film directed by Charles Lamont. It is the sixth, and also most successful, installment of Universal-International's Ma and Pa Kettle series starring Marjorie Main and Percy Kilbride.

== Plot ==
The Kettles' son Elwin enters a scholarship contest by submitting a report on farming techniques to a national magazine. The essay claims that his family's own farm is a model of modern efficiency. The magazine's editor, intrigued, insists on visiting the farm himself. Ma and Pa Kettle try to camouflage their ramshackle farm to reflect Elwin's visualization, while trying to keep the fastidious editor from inspecting the premises too closely.

== Cast ==
- Marjorie Main as Ma Kettle
- Percy Kilbride as Pa Kettle
- Alan Mowbray as Mannering
- Alice Kelley as Sally Maddocks
- Brett Halsey as Elwin Kettle
- Ross Elliott as Pete Crosby
- Mary Wickes as Miss Wetter
- Oliver Blake as Geoduck
- Stan Ross as Crowbar
- Emory Parnell as Billy Reed
- Irving Bacon as Mr. Maddocks
- Virginia Brissac as Mrs. Maddocks
- Richard Eyer as Billy Kettle

== Production ==
The role of the magazine's fussy editor was written for character comedian Edward Everett Horton, who agreed to make the film. A last-minute scheduling conflict forced Horton to withdraw, and the role was taken instead by Alan Mowbray.

== Release ==
=== Critical response ===
Film critic Leonard Maltin considers Ma and Pa Kettle at Home as "the best entry in the Ma and Pa Kettle series."
