= Bert Sotlar =

Yugoslav actor (1921–1992)

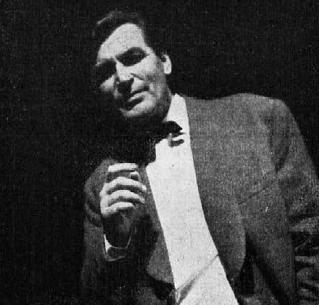
- Sotlar in 1962.
- Born: 4 February 1921; Kočevje, Kingdom of Yugoslavia
- Died: 10 June 1992 (aged 71); Ljubljana, Slovenia
- Occupation: Actor
- Years active: 1949 – 1988 (film)
- Spouse: Lidija Sotlar (m. 1955)

Bert Sotlar (4 February 1921 – 10 June 1992) was a Yugoslav film actor. He starred in the 1959 German film Dorothea Angermann.

== Filmography ==
Year	Title	Role	Notes
1949	Prica o fabrici	Tuzilac	
1949	Majka Katina	Jorgos	
1950	Jezero	Ing. Cernic	
1952	Life in Kajzar	Tjos	
1954	The House on the Coast	Dr. Branko Illic	
1955	Tri zgodbe	Naci	
1955	Trenutki odlocitve		
1956	Don't Look Back, My Son	Neven Novak	
1956	U mrezi	Niko	
1958	Rafal u nebo	Veljko	
1958	The Road a Year Long	Guglielmo Cosma (Emil Kozma)	
1959	Dorothea Angermann	Michael Sever	
1959	Dobri stari pianino	Partizanski komandant	
1959	Three Quarters of a Sun	Slavo	
1960	Strafbataillon 999	Leutnant Sergej	
1960	Brandenburg Division	Popoff	
1961	Square of Violence	Partisan Leader	
1962	Kozara	komandir Vuksa	
1962	One Fine Day	komandir Vuksa	
1963	Double Circle	Kresimir Lisac	
1963	Good Luck, Kekec	Father	
1964	Dobra kob	Alen Higins	
1964	Don't Cry, Peter	Lovro	
1964	Sette a Tebe		
1965	Lucija	Gasper	
1968	Sarajevski atentat	Ferdinand	
1972	Bronte: cronaca di un massacro che i libri di storia non hanno raccontato	Arcangelo Attinà	
1973	Cvetje v jeseni	Bostjan Presecnik	
1973	The Battle of Sutjeska	Barba	
1973	So	Ing. Krajanec	
1974	Crveni udar	Kraus	
1976	Cetiri dana do smrti	Djura Djakovic	
1976	Idealist	Mayor from Blatni Dol	
1977	Real Pests	Stari Stebe	
1978	Occupation in 26 Pictures	Stijepo	
1978	Sudbine		
1979	Draga moja Iza	oce Novak	
1979	Iskanja		
1982	Deseti brat	Krjavelj	
1982	Boj na poziralniku	Dihur	
1982	Kiklop	The Unknown	
1984	Veselo gostivanje	Tompa	
1987	Zivela svoboda!	Frantar	
1988	P.S. - Post Scriptum	Igralec	

== Bibliography ==
- Alpi, Deborah Lazaroff. Robert Siodmak: A Biography. McFarland, 1998.
