= Mr. Ace =

1946 film by Edwin L. Marin

- Directed by: Edwin L. Marin
- Written by: Fred F. Finkelhoffe
- Produced by: Benedict Bogeaus
- Starring: George Raft; Sylvia Sidney; Stanley Ridges
- Narrated by: Knox Manning
- Cinematography: Karl Struss
- Edited by: James Smith
- Music by: Heinz Roemheld
- Production company: Benedict Bogeaus Productions
- Distributed by: United Artists
- Release date: August 2, 1946
- Running time: 84 minutes
- Country: United States
- Language: English

Mr. Ace is a 1946 American film noir starring George Raft and Sylvia Sidney involving a society woman who taps a gangster for his political support as she runs for Congress. The movie was written by Fred F. Finkelhoffe, directed by Edwin L. Marin, and photographed by legendary cinematographer Karl Struss.

George Raft later appeared in a radio show The Cases of Mr. Ace, with Mr. Ace having become a private detective.

== Plot ==
Wealthy Congresswoman Margaret Wyndham Chase wants to run for governor of an unnamed state and needs the help of a political boss named Eddie Ace to stand a chance of making it all the way. In an attempt to grease him, she invites him to a dinner where also her other powerful friends will be attending.

Margaret has another problem. Her husband, Pembroke Chase III, wants a divorce, but she wants to keep up appearances until the governor's election is over. She refuses to sign the document he lays before her. Chase threatens her by saying he will try to ruin her campaign if she doesn't comply with his wish. She, in turn, threatens to reveal his many affairs to the public.

Chase tries to ruin the dinner by bad-talking Margaret in front of the others. He gets support from Ace, who believes that beautiful women should stay away from politics. Even Margaret's friend, political science professor Joshua Adams, wants Ace to stop her from running for governor. Adams says he isn't opposed to women in politics but doesn't want Margaret to do it, and believes that she needs more "heart" to be a truly great governor.

Ace introduces Margaret to his cronies, The Tomahawk Club, and she charms them all. Later they have a date and Ace begins to fall for Margaret.

Adams asks Ace to prevent Margaret from being elected, even though he believes that she would make a good governor if she learned to use her heart.

Margaret isn't discouraged by this, but decides to work harder on changing the men's views. She meets with Ace and Adams again to discuss politics, and afterwards she asks Ace to drive her to her house in the country. Ace complies and ends up kissing her goodnight, even though he refuses to change his mind about the governor issue.

Margaret continues to scheme to persuade Ace to help her. She talks to one of Ace's employees, Toomey, and convinces him to help her. With his help, Margaret is finally nominated to run for governor.

But Chase puts gravel in the machinery by forcing her to divorce him, claiming that she has had an extramarital affair with Ace. He also claims Ace will testify to what happened at the country house. This makes Margaret pull out of the race entirely and agree to the divorce.

Adams and Ace decide to host an independent political party to support Margaret as a reform candidate. Adams asks Margaret to run on a special platform opposing machine politics, and she agrees. With this support behind her, Margaret wins the election. She is unaware that she got the support of Ace in the run.

When Margaret meets Ace after the race, she promises to be the best governor possible, and they kiss to seal the deal.

== Cast ==
- George Raft as Eddie Ace
- Sylvia Sidney as Margaret Wyndham Chase
- Stanley Ridges as Toomey
- Sid Silvers as Pencil
- Jerome Cowan as Peter Craig
- Sara Haden as Alma Rhodes
- Alan Edwards as Pembroke Chase III
- Roman Bohnen as Professor Joshua Adams
- Joyce Bryant as nightclub singer

== Production ==
Producer Benedict Bogeaus had a deal making movies for United Artists. The film was originally going to be called The Congress Woman, and George Raft signed to star in October 1945. It was then retitled Mr Ace and the Queen and Tallulah Bankhead was named as a possible co-star. Later Clare Boothe Luce said she had been approached to play the lead and was considering it. Eventually the female lead went to Sylvia Sidney, who originally starred with Raft thirteen years previously in Pick-Up.

Filming started January 30, 1946. Raft was struck with pleurisy during filming, causing the production to shut down for three weeks.

=== Production credits ===
- Director - Edwin L. Marin
- Producer - Benedict Bogeaus
- Writing - Fred F. Finklehoffe (original story and screenplay)
- Cinematographer - Karl Struss
- Art direction - Ernst Fegté (production design), Fred Widdowson (set decorations)
- Costumes - Michael Woulfe (Miss Sidney's costumes)
- Sound - William Lynch (sound technician)
- Makeup artist - Otis Malcolm
- Music - David Chudnow (musical supervisor), Heinz Roemheld (musical score)
- Editing - James Smith (supervising editor)
- Assistant editor - Joseph Depew

== Reception ==
=== Box office ===
The film was a box office flop, George Raft's first in years, and the beginning of a legendarily steep decline in the wake of Raft having been a huge star.

=== Critical ===
The Los Angeles Times called it "an entertaining picture".

=== Legacy ===
The film inspired a radio show, The Cases of Mr. Ace (1947) starring Raft as private eye Eddie Ace. This later became The Cases of Eddie Drake.

The film inspired a painting, Mr Ace by Yasuo Kuniyoshi.
