= Dino Cellini =

American casino manager (1914–1978)

Dino Cellini (November 19, 1914 – November 2, 1978) ran casinos for New York mobster Meyer Lansky in Havana, Cuba during the late 1950s and early 1960s. Cellini later ran casinos in the Bahamas and the United Kingdom.

== Early years ==
Dino Vicente Cellini, is the son of an Italian barber who immigrated to the U.S. Cellini had three brothers, Edward, Goffredo & Bobby, and a sister Julia. Cellini grew up in the steel mill town of Steubenville, Ohio during the Depression years. As a youngster, Cellini worked at Rex's Cigar Store as a dice/craps casino dealer and croupier with singer Dean Martin, then known as Dean (Dino) Crocetti.

== Career in gambling ==
During this era, many cigar stores in Steubenville were fronts for mob rackets; bookmaking, numbers, pool, illegal drinking, and illegal gambling rackets. Steel mill workers from Steubenville and nearby Youngstown, Ohio would frequent these stores after their shifts, spending their meager paychecks for this entertainment. Craps and Barboot, a Greek dice game, were the games of choice at these places. The gambling halls would hire "mechanics", specialists in manipulating the dice and cheating, to police their craps games. The mechanic would ward off undesirable customers, break winning streaks of lucky customers, and hustle those with much money to lose. Cellini was known for his talent with dice and eventually became the youngest "bust out" man in Steubenville.

As a later associate of Santo Trafficante, Sr. and Meyer Lansky, Cellini ran the mob-backed Riviera Casino and Tropicana Club in Havana, Cuba. In 1959, the Cuban Revolution overthrew the Batista regime, with Cellini being detained as an "undesirable alien" on 6 May. Cellini was held at the Triscornia migratory camp for several months before being deported.

== Later years ==
During the 1960s, after leaving Cuba, Cellini first ran casinos in the Bahamas for Lansky. However, he and brother Eddie were eventually deported. Cellini then headed to Europe to run gambling operations in Rome and London. Along with the Ayoub Brothers from Steubenville, Cellini ran a croupier's school in the United Kingdom. He also helped manage the Colony Sports Club casino in London with actor George Raft. However, an investigation by Scotland Yard soon uncovered evidence of links between New York mob figures and British casinos. Cellini and Raft were barred from participating in legalized gambling establishments in the United Kingdom. Early in the 60's, Cellini was reportedly involved in the Cuban Project, also called Operation Mongoose, an abortive joint operation by the Central Intelligence Agency and organized crime to assassinate Cuban president Fidel Castro.

In the early 1970s, Cellini had ties to Mary Carter Paints (precursor of Resorts International) in the Bahamas. He also became involved in Resorts International in Atlantic City, New Jersey, the first legal casino in the U.S. outside of Nevada. During this same period, Cellini was involved with swindler Robert Vesco in the embezzlement of over $240 million from the mutual fund Investors Overseas Service.

In 1972 Lansky and Cellini were indicted by a grand jury in United States District Court in Miami for tax evasion. Cellini was also charged with filing false income tax returns.

In 1976, Cellini appeared in Hamburg, Germany with Freddy Ajoub and Joseph Nesline, having contact with Wilfrid "Frieda" Schulz. Schulz was the self-proclaimed king of Sankt Pauli, Hamburg red-light district. The Hamburg Police suggest that Schulz and the American mobsters worked together for years.

In the late 1980s, there were unsubstantiated reports that Cellini and his brother Eddie had dealings with Nathan Landow, a top Democratic fundraiser for Democratic politician Al Gore's Presidential bid in 2000.

In March 2010, there were reports that actor Robert De Niro and director Martin Scorsese were developing a film biography of Cellini. However, neither De Niro or Scorsese have confirmed these reports.
