= I Am the Law =

I Am the Law may refer to:

- I Am the Law (1922 film), starring Alice Lake and Kenneth Harlan
- I Am the Law (1938 film), starring Edward G. Robinson
- I'm the Law, 1952 syndicated TV series starring George Raft
- "I am the law!", frequently-used expression by fictional comic book character Judge Dredd
- "I Am the Law", 1981 song by The Human League written about this character which features on the album Dare
- "I Am the Law", 1987 song by Anthrax written about this character which features on the album Among the Living
