= Chance at Heaven =

1933 film directed by William A. Seiter

- Theatrical release poster
- Directed by: William A. Seiter; James Anderson (assistant)
- Screenplay by: Julien Josephson; Sarah Y. Mason
- Based on: A Chance at Heaven; 1932 short story by Vina Delmar
- Produced by: Merian C. Cooper
- Starring: Ginger Rogers; Joel McCrea; Marian Nixon; Andy Devine; Lucien Littlefield
- Cinematography: Nicholas Musuraca
- Edited by: James B. Morley
- Music by: Max Steiner; Roy Webb
- Production company: RKO Pictures
- Distributed by: RKO Pictures
- Release date: October 27, 1933
- Running time: 71 minutes
- Country: United States
- Language: English

Chance at Heaven is a 1933 American pre-Code drama film directed by William A. Seiter and written by Julien Josephson and Sarah Y. Mason based on a 1932 short story of the same name by Vina Delmar. The film stars Ginger Rogers, Joel McCrea, Marian Nixon, Andy Devine and Lucien Littlefield. It was released on October 27, 1933 by RKO Pictures.

== Plot ==
Blacky owns a very successful service station in Silver Beach, Massachusetts, a summer resort for the wealthy. He plans to own a chain of stations someday and to marry his girlfriend Marje. However, he falls in love with Glory, a flirtatious, accident-prone debutante whose snobbish mother has just purchased a large summer home. An unlikely friendship develops between Glory and Marje, who sees that Blacky is truly in love with Glory and tells him to follow his heart and marry Glory.

Glory and Blacky elope and settle into his bungalow. Glory's mother weepily tells her that she has ruined her life. However, the newlyweds are happy and Glory soon learns that she is pregnant. Glory's mother tells her that she is only a child herself and that she has no idea what she will have to endure. Blacky is ecstatic, but Glory's mother later persuades him to permit Glory to visit New York for medical care even though the local doctor is a highly qualified obstetrician. The visit lasts several months. When Blacky learns from Marje that Glory's mother wants her trunks sent to California, he rushes to the city.

Blacky arrives at the New York apartment to find that Glory has changed dramatically and desires a divorce. She rejects Blacky's attempts at romance and tells him that the marriage was a mistake because he married the wrong kind of a girl. She wants a life with her friends and her mother. When Blacky asks about the baby, Glory's mother informs him that Glory had not actually been pregnant.

After the divorce, Blacky returns to his bungalow to find his old armchair in place and Marje preparing his favorite dinner.

== Cast ==
- Ginger Rogers as Marjorie "Marje" Harris
- Joel McCrea as Blackstone "Blacky" Gorman
- Marian Nixon as Glory Franklyn
- Virginia Hammond as Mrs. S. T. Franklyn
- Andy Devine as Al
- Lucien Littlefield as Mr. Fred Harris
- George Meeker as Sid Larrick
- Ann Shoemaker as Mrs. Harris
