= Viña Delmar =

American dramatist

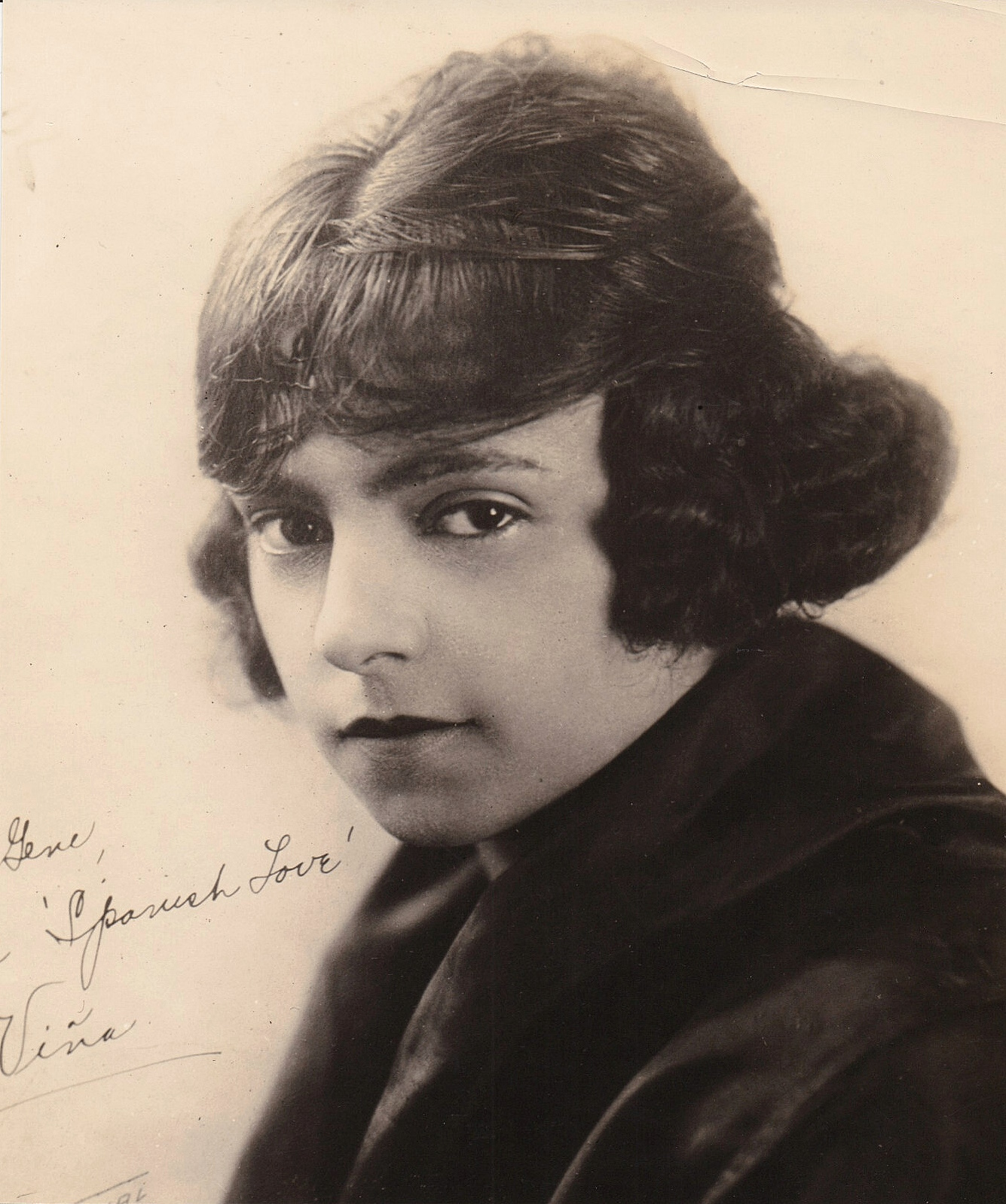
- Delmar pictured in 1921
- Born: Alvina Louise Croter; January 29, 1903; New York City, U.S.
- Died: January 19, 1990 (age 86); Los Angeles, U.S.
- Occupations: Writer; playwright; screenwriter
- Spouse: Eugene Delmar
- Writing career
- Period: 1920s–1970s
- Genres: Fiction, historical fiction

Viña Delmar (born Alvina Louise Croter; January 29, 1903 – January 19, 1990) was an American short story writer, novelist, playwright, and screenwriter who worked from the 1920s to the 1970s. She rose to fame in the late 1920s with the publication of her suggestively titled novel, Bad Girl, which became a bestseller in 1928. Delmar also wrote the screenplay to the screwball comedy The Awful Truth, for which she received an Academy Award nomination in 1937.

== Early years ==
Viña Delmar was born Alvina Louise Croter on January 29, 1903, in Brooklyn, New York, the daughter of vaudeville performers Isaac "Ike" Croter and Jennie A. Croter, née Guran or Guerin. Her parents were regulars on the vaudeville circuit as well as performers in the Yiddish theater in New York City and other major cities in the United States. Ike Croter went by the stage name of "Charlie Hoey" (or "Chas Hoey"), and formed half of the musical duo "Hoey and Lee," alongside partner Harry Lee. Jennie Croter was a chorus girl and singer who performed under the name "Jean Powell" (or "Jeanne Powell").

As a child, Delmar was taken along by her parents as they performed on the vaudeville circuit in the United States. At the age of three weeks, she was in San Francisco, with the top drawer of her mother's trunk used as a cradle. In 1911, when Delmar was eight, her mother retired from the stage, and the family settled in the Flatbush neighborhood of Brooklyn. Not long afterwards, on September 13, 1916, her mother died, and with her father, Viña moved to the Bronx. She attended public schools only until the age of 13. By age 16, she was appearing on the vaudeville stage. With her stage career struggling—Delmar deemed herself "not a good actress"—she took on various employments in the 1920s, including theater usher, typist, switchboard operator, and assistant manager of a moving picture house in Harlem. Sardonically, playing off her failings on the stage, she noted "I was a notable success as an usher."

In 1921, Viña married a man named Albert Zimmerman, a radio announcer and writer. Around the time of the marriage, Zimmerman was using the name Eugene Delmar or Gene Delmar, perhaps as a stage name. Viña readily assumed the Delmar surname as well, and it became her de facto name. Zimmerman, apparently, formally changed his name to Eugene Delmar in July 1929, though conclusive evidence of this action is lacking.

The Delmars gained a brief moment of national attention in June 1921 when Viña, on a gag, placed an advertisement to "rent" her husband for a year. The stunt, apparently due to financial hardship, led to a story that quickly spread throughout the United States. The ad read: "FOR RENT One husband. Terms, $5,000 a year. Qualifications: Handsome, lovely disposition, great adaptability, stay home nights, beautiful singing voice, wonderful ballroom dancer, superior education VINA DELMAR (Mrs. Gene Delmar)" Viña's explanation for the advertisement was reported in some accounts: "Gene is a writer," she said of her husband. "He writes lovely poems to me and wants to write other things. Of course, he couldn’t support us yet on writing." The publication that ran the original advertisement was not identified in the newspaper reports of 1928 and remains unidentified.

== Writing career ==
As a child of nine years of age, Delmar showed an interest in writing and began to pen stories. Her first success with publication was achieved in 1922 with her short story "Tony Checks Out," which appeared in the risqué publication Snappy Stories.

Dust jacket of Bad Girl (1929), 17th printing, Grosset & Dunlop, publisher

=== Bad Girl and other early novels ===
Delmar's breakthrough as a writer occurred at age 25 with Bad Girl, a popular fiction novel published in 1928 by Harcourt Brace and Co. Spinning a cautionary tale about premarital sex, pregnancy, and childbirth, filtered through the lens of the tenement, working-class married life, Bad Girl was an unexpected and immediate sensation. The novel gained additional notoriety when it was initially banned in Boston. The success of the book induced the Literary Guild to choose it as its April 1928 selection, which edged sales even higher. The book entered the Publishers Weekly fiction bestseller list at No. 9 on May 26, 1928, and peaked at No. 4 on June 30, 1928, holding that position for four weeks. Overall, for the year 1928, the book ranked fifth on the Publishers Weekly fiction bestseller list.

In 1929, attempting to capitalize on the success of Bad Girl, Delmar wrote two other books in quick succession, each featuring a suggestive title. Kept Woman was a novel, while Loose Ladies presented eleven fictional portraits of modern American city women. Both books drew the attention of censors, but little came of it. As the Great Depression took hold in the early 1930s, Delmar's gritty tenement stories began to slip out of favor with the reading public. Women Live Too Long and The Marriage Racket were published in 1932 and 1933, respectively, but neither book nor the quick follow-ups to Bad Girl managed to crack the bestseller lists, though all were later reissued in paperback by Avon in the 1940s. With the exception of "The End of the World," a short story that initially appeared in Cosmopolitan, and which was reformatted and sold in paperback in 1934, Delmar didn't have a new book published until 1950.

=== The Delmar writing team ===
Viña Delmar wrote her stories, novels, and screenplays with the editorial assistance of her husband, Gene. Although he rarely received credit in the published works, the Delmars considered themselves a writing team. In a 1956 Times Book Review interview, she pointed out the collaborative nature of their working relationship: "When we're working, we discuss the plot a long time. I write up a draft in longhand. Then my husband puts it through the typewriter, changing as he goes." In a 1928 interview, Delmar explained that she wrote four nights a week with a pencil. She wrote very quickly, and her husband would add missing words and correct grammatical errors while he typed. He also would argue with her and help refine her plots and characters. All the intellectual basis of her work was her own, but her husband helped substantially with her writing process.

=== Hollywood ===
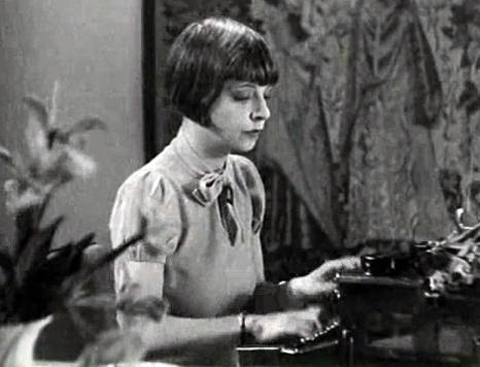
Viña Delmar in trailer for Sadie McKee, as the writer

The earlier success of Bad Girl, which was adapted to the screen in 1931, gave Delmar entry to Hollywood. Sometime in the 1930s, Viña and Eugene Delmar moved from New York to Los Angeles. There, the Delmars nourished a connection to film director Leo McCarey, which led to contracts for two screenplays, both of which were developed into McCarey-directed movies. The first was the drama Make Way for Tomorrow (1937), the story of an elderly couple losing their home to foreclosure; the second, the romantic comedy The Awful Truth (1937), now considered among the top screwball comedy films ever produced. Both movies found success at the box office, especially The Awful Truth, which starred Cary Grant and Irene Dunne. Viña Delmar was honoured with an Academy Award nomination for her screenplay of The Awful Truth. Soon thereafter, however, the Delmars chose to exit the screenplay business, even though they continued to live in Hollywood. "We used to do movie scenarios," Viña stated in a 1956 interview with The New York Times Book Review. "There was The Awful Truth many years ago. That was good, and since we didn't like the work we decided to quit while we were winning."

=== Theater ===
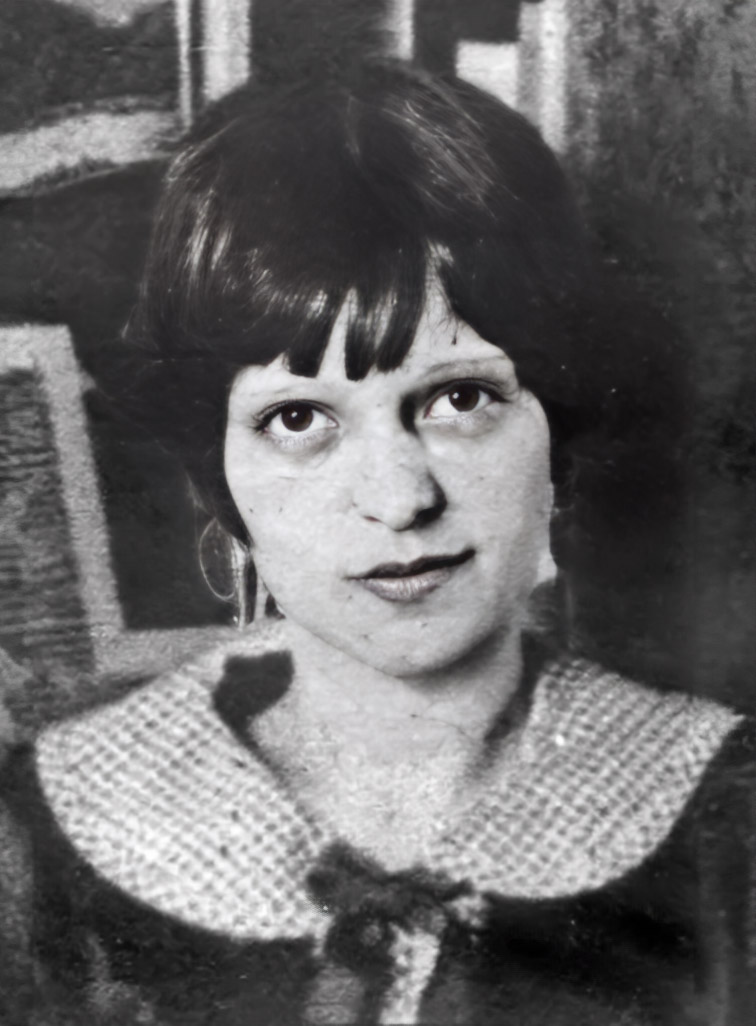
Delmar during "Bad Girl" in 1928

During the 1930s and 40s, Delmar and her husband continued to churn out short stories, most of which were regularly featured in large-circulation magazines, such as Cosmopolitan and Liberty. By the mid-1940s, the duo had switched gears to the theater, writing the drama The Rich Full Life: A Play in Three Acts, which opened November 9, 1945, in New York City. However, the play failed to find an audience and closed after 27 performances (it was however filmed as an Elizabeth Taylor vehicle entitled Cynthia (1947)). The Delmars found more success with their second effort, Mid-Summer, a comedy that opened at the Vanderbilt Theatre January 21, 1953. The play featured Geraldine Page in her Broadway debut. After a respectable run of 109 performances, Mid-Summer closed April 25, 1953. Warm Wednesday, another comedy, was published in book form by Samuel French, Inc. in 1959, but, evidently, was never produced on Broadway, as there is no reference to the work in the Internet Broadway Database.

=== Later books ===
While the Delmars made their initial bid for theatrical success, Viña returned to writing fiction, first with a novel set in antebellum New Orleans, serialized in 1947 in the New York Daily News as I'll Take My Stand and published in softcover as New Orleans Lady in 1949. Soon thereafter, About Mrs. Leslie — publicized as the author's first new novel in many years — was published to moderate success in 1950. Detailing the life and love of a small-time Beverly Hills boarding house owner and the lives of her tenants, the novel's movie rights were purchased prior to its publication with its 1954 filmation proving a considerable success.

Three other Delmar novels were published in 1950–51, after which the author again apparently took a sabbatical from writing fiction. In 1956, Beloved, her first novel in five years, was published. As with New Orleans Lady, Beloved was set in the 19th century American South but was focused on actual historical personages, chiefly Judah Benjamin. Also appearing in Beloved was John Slidell who Delmar made the focus of her 1961 novel The Big Family.

On 14 December 1957, Viña Delmar's editorial partner and husband Eugene Delmar died. After his death, Delmar continued to write steadily, producing nine book-length works between 1959 and 1976, all but one of which were published by Harcourt, Brace and Co. Notable among these was The Becker Scandal, which examined the life, trial and execution of New York City policeman Charles Becker. Some in academia consider the work to be autobiographical, while others are more questioning of Delmar's recollections. Delmar's last book, McKeever, was published in 1976.

== Themes ==
Growing up in New York as the daughter of theater actors and performers, Delmar was aware of class conflict and social issues. In her article for the Belles Lettres publication, a women’s literary journal, Carolyn Banks writes, “Her mother had pretensions and never quite accepted her father's ties to old neighbourhood friends, many of whom were involved in shady activities. Viña, an only child, was witness to their many steely battles about this and doubtless internalized the conflict.” Class conflicts manifested themselves in Delmar’s work later on, as many of her characters were working-class and her writing often portrayed tenement life. In fact, one of her novels was criticized for its “non-intellectual, petty-minded, restless, indolent, improvident, poverty-stricken” characters. Delmar’s characters were working-class women who cursed, had premarital sex, thought independently, and faced modern issues. Delmar dropped out of school as a teenager and described herself as poorly educated, but during the 1920s and 1930s, she was considered one of the best writers of the time with a unique and powerful understanding of the human condition. Her works were written with a high level of detail and explored complicated and controversial subjects of promiscuity, childbirth, and abortion. Critics of her novel Bad Girl complained that “A novel is not the place for obstetrics” and “Miss Delmar must learn to leave something to the reader’s imagination”. However, other critics praised it for its startling realism and style and heralded it as an example of literary freedom.

== Celebrity ==
At the age of twenty-three, Viña Delmar was thrust into the public spotlight due to the tremendous, unexpected success of her first novel, Bad Girl. With her bobbed hair, pixie smile, and slender, petite frame, she epitomized the image of the quintessential flapper. When several of her short stories and novels were later adapted to film, Delmar's name and face were often featured prominently on promotional posters and in newspaper advertising. Movie advertising sometimes even displayed her image and name above the actors starring in the films. While she could have been a major celebrity, Delmar maintained a more private image. She also avoided personal relationships with editors. Her fame lasted into the 1930s, and then fizzled out. However, she continued to write prolifically throughout her life in all different formats and mediums.

== Personal life ==
On May 20, 1921, at age of 18, Viña married Albert Otto Zimmerman in New York City. The marriage record indicates that "Alvina L. Miller" was divorced. If the record is accurate, her marriage to Zimmerman (Eugene Delmar) was her second. Viña claimed she met her husband at a Greenwich Village rendezvous, that it was a case of "love at first sight," and they married the next day.

After her marriage, Delmar and her husband initially resided for several years in the Inwood area of Manhattan. They then lived in Scarsdale, New York in the 1930s. By 1940, the duo, along with their teenage son, Gray (born 1924), had moved to Los Angeles and Hollywood. Viña and Eugene Delmar remained married until his death on December 14, 1957, in Los Angeles. Gray died in an automobile racing accident in 1966. Viña Delmar died January 19, 1990, at age 86 in a Pasadena, California convalescent home. She is interred in Valhalla Memorial Park Cemetery in North Hollywood, California, as is her husband, Eugene Delmar.

Note: Official documents and published material reveal that Viña Delmar and her husband, Gene, were not always forthright when it came to providing personal information. Viña is quoted in a 1931 book of author biographies that she was "born in the winter of 1905." She was actually born January 29, 1903, per her New York birth certificate (Certificate No. 3137). The 1903 date of her birth is confirmed by the 1910 Census record of the "Charles" Croter family. Because of the 1905 date Viña provided for her birth, it was reported in various publications that she had married Eugene Delmar at age 16. This was inaccurate, as she was 18; but she may have had a prior marriage. There also are two marriage records on file that document, to one degree or another, Viña and Gene Delmar as participants: (1) the aforementioned Zimmerman marriage record (Albert O. Zimmerman, age 21, married Alvina L. Miller, age 18, May 10, 1921, Manhattan, New York; others (present): Charles Croter, Jean Cariaga/Miller); and (2) a Gene Delmar marriage in Philadelphia (Gene Delmar married Hoey, 1922, Philadelphia, PA; Marriage License No. 457957). Considering that Viña Delmar's father went by the stage name Charlie or Chas. Hoey, the record possibly reflects that Viña and Gene Delmar married a second time, or perhaps renewed their vows, with Viña using the surname "Hoey."

== Works ==
=== Novels ===
- Bad Girl (New York: Harcourt Brace & Co., 1928)
- Kept Woman (New York: Harcourt Brace & Co., 1929)
- Loose Ladies (New York: Harcourt Brace & Co., 1929) Collection of short stories.
- Women Live Too Long (New York: Harcourt Brace & Co., 1932)
- The Marriage Racket (New York: Harcourt Brace & Co., 1933)
- The End of the World (International Magazine Co., 1934) Reprint of the complete novel that was originally published in Cosmopolitan Magazine; 54 pages.
- The Love Trap (New York: Avon #189, 1946)
- The Restless Passion (New York: Avon Book Co., 1947); retitled reissue of Women Live Too Long (1932).
- New Orleans Lady (New York: Avon #209, 1949)
- About Mrs. Leslie (New York: Harcourt Brace & Co., 1950)
- The Laughing Stranger (New York: Harcourt Brace & Co., 1950)
- Strangers in Love (New York: Dell Pub. Co., 1951)
- Marcaboth Women (New York: Harcourt Brace & Co., 1951)
- Beloved (New York: Harcourt Brace & Co., 1956)
- The Breeze From Camelot (New York: Harcourt Brace & Co., 1959)
- The Big Family (New York: Harcourt Brace & Co., 1961)
- The Enchanted (Harcourt Brace & Co., 1965)
- Grandmère (New York: Harcourt Brace & World, 1967)
- The Becker Scandal: A Time Remembered (New York: Harcourt Brace & World, 1968)

The Becker Scandal deals with the events surrounding the arrest, trial and execution of New York City policeman Charles Becker. The book is considered by some scholars and readers autobiographical and by others historical fiction. The actual disposition of the book, whether factual, quasi-factual, or embellished fiction, may be impossible to determine.

- The Freeways (New York: Harcourt Brace & World, 1971)
- Anatomy of Spanish (privately printed, 1973)
- A Time for Titans (New York: Harcourt Brace Jovanovich, 1974)
- McKeever (New York: Harcourt Brace Jovanovich, 1976)

=== Plays ===
- The Rich Full Life: A Play in Three Acts (New York: Samuel French, 1946)
- Mid-Summer: A Comedy in Three Acts (New York: Samuel French, 1954)
- Warm Wednesday: A Comedy in Three Acts (New York: Samuel French, 1959)

=== Screenplays ===
- Make Way for Tomorrow (1937)
- The Awful Truth (1937)

== Filmography ==
- 1929 Dance Hall (story)
- 1930 Playing Around (story "Sheba" as Vina Delmar)
- 1930 A Soldier's Plaything (story)
- 1931 Bad Girl (novel and play)
- 1932 Marido y mujer (The Spanish language version of Bad Girl.)
- 1932 Uptown New York (based on a story)
- 1933 The Woman Accused (Liberty Magazine serial chapter)
- 1933 Pick-up (story)
- 1933 Chance at Heaven (story "A Chance at Heaven" as Vina Delmar)
- 1934 Sadie McKee (story "Pretty Sadie McKee" as Vina Delmar)
- 1935 Hands Across the Table (story "Bracelets")
- 1935 Bad Boy (story as Vina Delmar)
- 1936 King of Burlesque (story as Vina Delmar)
- 1937 Make Way for Tomorrow (screenplay)
- 1937 The Awful Truth (screenplay)
- 1940 Manhattan Heartbeat (play as Vina Delmar)
- 1942 The Great Man's Lady (short story)
- 1947 Cynthia (play)
- 1954 About Mrs. Leslie (novel)
- 1955 Make Way for Tomorrow (story and original screenplay for Lux Video Theatre TV series)
- 1956 Hands Across the Table (story for Lux Video Theatre TV series)
