= Dance Hall (1929 film) =

1929 film by Melville Brown

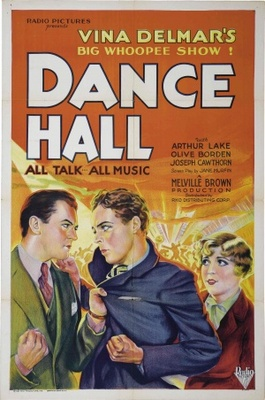
- Theatrical release poster
- Directed by: Melville Brown
- Screenplay by: Jane Murfin; J. Walter Ruben
- Story by: Viña Delmar
- Produced by: Henry Hobart
- Starring: Arthur Lake; Olive Borden
- Cinematography: Jack MacKenzie
- Edited by: Ann McKnight; George Marsh
- Distributed by: Radio Pictures
- Release dates: December 15, 1929 (New York City); December 27, 1929 (United States)
- Running time: 65 minutes
- Country: United States
- Language: English

Dance Hall is a 1929 American pre-Code musical film directed by Melville Brown and written by Jane Murfin and J. Walter Ruben, based on the short story of the same name by Vina Delmar. The film centers a love triangle with a shipping clerk competing with a dashing aviator for the affections of a young taxi dancer. It was Radio Pictures' second to last release of the decade, and was a critical and financial flop. (Note: The RKO Story (1982) has Dance Hall listed as the last release, and it was the last general release, but Seven Keys to Baldpate premiered on Christmas Day, 1929, although it was not released until January 1930.)

== Plot ==
Dance Hall (1929)

Shipping clerk Tommy Flynn engages Gracie Nolan, a young taxi dancer, and the two gain some success in dance halls, winning several dance contests. As they do, he becomes infatuated with her, but she only has eyes for Ted Smith, a pilot who wants her as a trophy of his own.

Flynn is unsuccessful in his attempts to woo the young Gracie, until the pilot crashes during his attempt at a transcontinental flight. Flynn hides the fact from Gracie that the pilot is still alive, as he attempts to get her to fall in love with him. When she discovers his subterfuge, she is enraged and rushes off to be with the pilot.

However, when she finds Smith, she uncovers that he has been living with another woman. Devastated, she returns to Tommy, who takes her back. Reunited, the two lovers become a successful dancing team.

== Cast ==
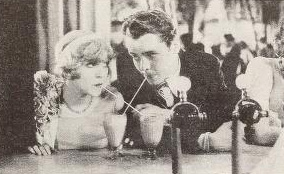
Olive Borden and Arthur Lake

- Arthur Lake as Tommy Flynn
- Olive Borden as Gracie Nolan
- Joseph Cawthorn as Bremmer
- Margaret Seddon as Mrs. Flynn
- Ralph Emerson as Ted Smith
- Lee Moran as Ernie
- Helen Kaiser as Bee
- Tom O'Brien as Truck driver
- George Irving as Doctor Loring

== Production ==
In February 1929, it was announced that Viña Delmar had been signed by RKO to write the story of Dance Hall. By the end of June, RKO had scheduled filming to begin on approximately August 1, 1929.

In September, The Film Daily reported that Melville Brown had been signed to a long-term contract by RKO, and that Dance Hall would be his first project with his new studio, and in early October, it was learned that J. Walter Ruben would be contributing to the script's dialogue. Also in October, RKO announced that Arthur Lake and Olive Borden were attached to the project, and also that Margaret Seddon, Ralph Emerson and Tom O'Brien would be joining the cast. The production featured the introduction of two new dances: the "Dumb Drag" and the "Blue Bottom".

While originally scheduled for August, filming on Dance Hall did not begin until mid-October 1929. After production began, a fire at Consolidated Film Industries, the laboratory developing the negatives, destroyed two days worth of filming. By November 20, filming on Dance Hall had concluded and the picture was being edited.

Dance Hall opened on December 15, 1929, at the Globe Theater in New York City, although the American Film Institute has it opening a day earlier.

== Reception ==
In his film review for The New York Times, Mordaunt Hall characterized Dance Hall as mildly entertaining: "... while it may be a slice of life, or whatever one cares to characterize it, the result is far from being an edifying entertainment. Possibly some of those who compete in marathon dances may find that this production appeals to them, but others, young or old, will, in all probability, wish for something just a trifle more stimulating to the mind than this tale of a dance cup winner and his love for his partner."

Film historians Richard Jewell and Vernon Harbin in The RKO Story (1982) considered Dance Hall a "sour note ..." yet "... mildly diverting." They further described that the film "collapsed in the critical areas of acting (Arthur Lake was the weakest of the weak), (and) dialogue ..."

== See also ==
- List of early sound feature films (1926–1929)
