= The Cases of Eddie Drake =

- Created by: Harlan Thompson; Herbert L. Strock
- Starring: Don Haggerty; Patricia Morison (ep. 1-9); Lynne Roberts (ep. 10-13)
- Country of origin: United States
- No. of episodes: 13

Production
- Running time: 30 minutes

Original release
- Network: DuMont (filmed at CBS)
- Release: March 6 – May 29, 1952

The Cases of Eddie Drake is an American crime drama series which initially was shown in syndication in 1951, before airing on the DuMont Television Network during 1952. It was a crime drama originally filmed for CBS Television by Imppro, a small outfit in 1948. The TV series was adapted from the radio series The Cases of Mr. Ace (1945-1947) starring George Raft, with both series written by Jason James. Don Haggerty played the lead in the new series.

== Synopsis ==
The series stars Don Haggerty as Eddie Drake, a typically flippant, wisecracking private eye from New York, and (in the original nine episodes) Patricia Morison as psychiatrist Dr. Karen Gayle. Gayle is writing a book on criminal psychology, and in each episode Drake stops by her office to recount his latest case to her, while the two flirt heavily. Each episode is told in flashback, narrated by Drake to Gayle.

After Morison leaves the show following episode nine, Lynne Roberts portrays criminologist Dr. Joan Wright in the final four episodes, fulfilling essentially the same function as Gayle. Starting partway through the series, Drake drives a 3-wheeled 1948 Davis D-2 Divan car (which he calls "Dave"). The show also features Theodore von Eltz in the regular role of Lt. Walsh, Drake's police contact.

A slightly similar detective series, The Files of Jeffrey Jones, also starring Don Haggerty, was produced by Lindsley Parsons in 1954.

== Production background ==
After nine episodes were filmed in late 1948, co-star Patricia Morison was offered the lead in the Broadway musical Kiss Me, Kate, and left the show. Sources differ as to what exactly happened directly thereafter; Lynne Roberts was definitely cast in the replacement role of Dr. Joan Wright and filmed four more episodes, but precisely when these episodes were filmed is a matter of debate. However, they were completed by no later than 1951. This is known because while the show was never seen on CBS, 13 episodes of Eddie Drake were offered in syndication by 1951, where it aired in Chicago and possibly other markets. By 1952, DuMont bought the series and gave it a network airing. Some sources indicate that DuMont had filmed the four additional episodes to round out the series to the standard 13-episode season. However, the 13 episode package was offered in 1951, before DuMont's involvement, and it would be extremely unusual for the cash-strapped DuMont Network to commit to filming new episodes using the expensive film process that the series used.

The final episode aired on DuMont on May 29, 1952.

The program was filmed at Republic Studios.

== Episode status ==
The episode "Shoot the Works" (aired April 10, 1952) is available online. The episode "Sleep Well, Angel" (May 1, 1952) is in the collection of the Paley Center for Media.

== Films released in the UK ==
Between February 1954 and February 1956, four feature films edited from the Eddie Drake series were released by Butchers Film Service and Jack Phillips Film Distribution to smaller cinemas in the UK:

- The Brass Key
- Eddie Drake Investigates
- Pattern for Murder
- Murder Ad Lib

== See also ==
- List of programs broadcast by the DuMont Television Network
- List of surviving DuMont Television Network broadcasts

== Bibliography ==
- David Weinstein, The Forgotten Network: DuMont and the Birth of American Television (Philadelphia: Temple University Press, 2004) ISBN 1-59213-245-6
- Alex McNeil, Total Television, Fourth edition (New York: Penguin Books, 1980) ISBN 0-14-024916-8
- Tim Brooks and Earle Marsh, The Complete Directory to Prime Time Network TV Shows, Third edition (New York: Ballantine Books, 1964) ISBN 0-345-31864-1
