= Playing Around =

1930 film

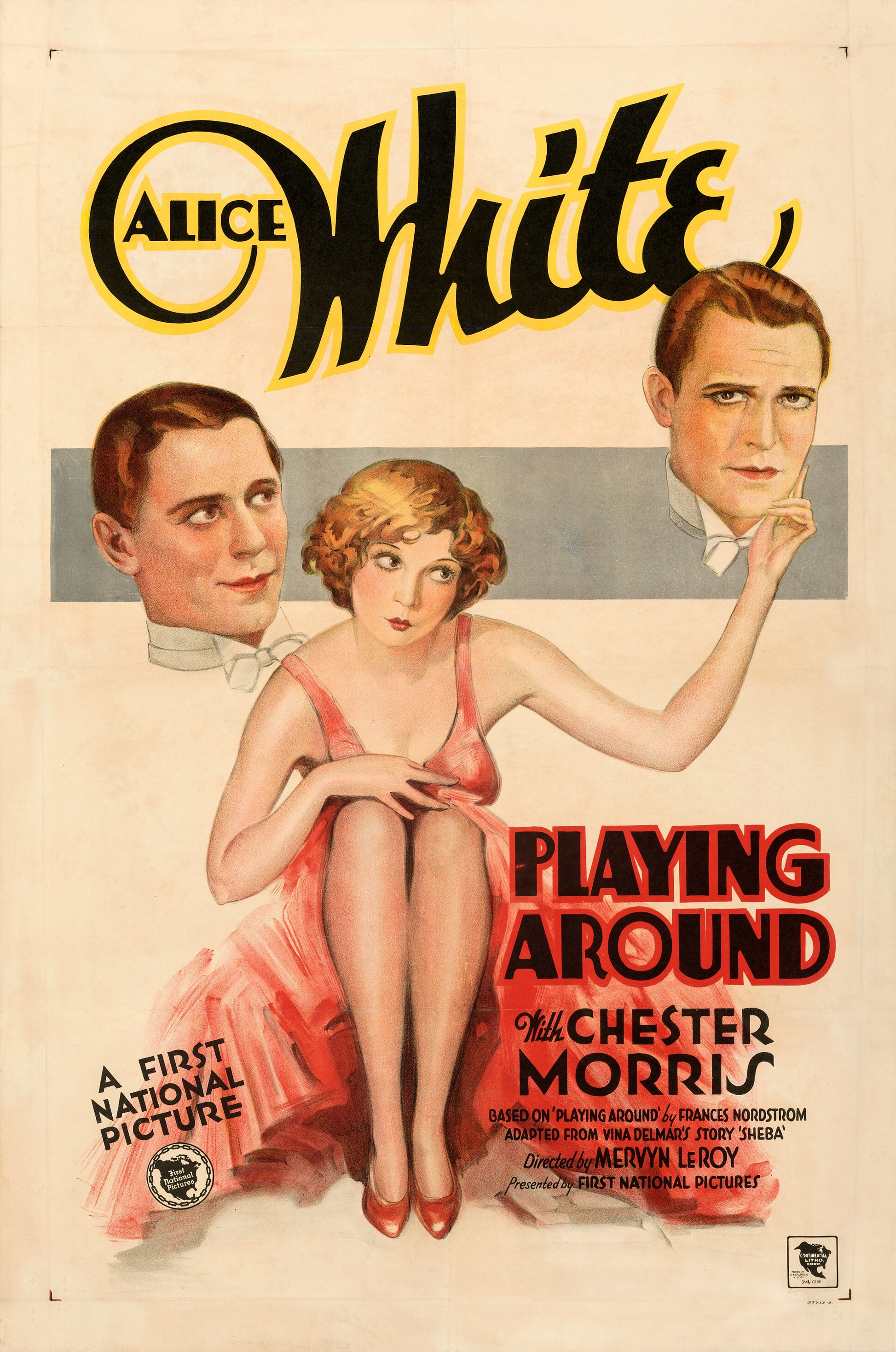
- Directed by: Mervyn LeRoy
- Written by: Harvey F. Thew; Adele Comandini; Frances Nordstrom
- Based on: Sheba short story by Viña Delmar
- Produced by: Warner Bros.
- Starring: Alice White; Chester Morris; William Bakewell
- Cinematography: Sol Polito
- Music by: Earl Sitar and Leo F. Forbstein
- Production company: First National Pictures
- Distributed by: Warner Bros. Pictures, Inc.
- Release date: January 19, 1930
- Running time: 66 minutes
- Country: United States
- Language: English

Playing Around is a 1930 American pre-Code drama film with songs, starring Alice White, Chester Morris, and William Bakewell. It was adapted from the story "Sheba", written by Viña Delmar. The film was produced and distributed by First National Pictures, a subsidiary of Warner Bros. Pictures.

== Plot ==
Sheba Miller, a working-class girl who dreams about living a life of luxury. Her father runs a cigar store while she works as a stenographer. Jack, a soda jerk, is madly in love with her and has even asked her father for his consent to their marriage. Although Pa Miller likes Jack and would like to see his daughter marry him, Sheba refuses him on the wage he currently earns. One day, she convinces him to take her to a fancy exclusive nightclub, the Pirates Den. Once they arrive and are seated, he is shocked at the prices and suggests that they go elsewhere; this leads to an argument. As the couple is about to leave, an announcement is made for a leg contest and Sheba decides to enter. She wins first place and is awarded her prize by Nickey Solomon, a gangster. Dazzled by his fancy clothes and car, Sheba accepts his attentions and give Jack the air.

Eventually Nickey asks Sheba to marry him, but before they tie the knot, Solomon, who is low on cash, robs a cigar store and in the process shoots the man behind the counter. Without knowing it, he has shot Sheba's father. As the two are about to head out for another night on the town now that they have money, they stop at her father's cigar store to say hello. As they approach, they see police stationed around and Nickey realizes what he has done. He convinces Sheba to stay in the car while he checks out what happened. He talks a bit to the police and then tells her that her father is all right and that he is now at the police station to help the police identify a thief. In reality, however, her father is at the hospital being treated for the gunshot wound. Nickey convinces Sheba to continue their date and they drive to the club, but Jack, who suspects that Solomon was behind the robbery, asks the police to help with his entrapment plan. They manage to get Nickey to unwittingly confess to the crime and convince him to skip town, but they arrest him at the train station before he has a chance to board. Solomon is taken to jail and Sheba is informed that her father is perfectly fine. Sheba, humbled by the experience, agrees to marry Jack on his $35 a week salary.

== Cast ==
- Alice White as Sheba Miller
- Chester Morris as Nickey Solomon
- William Bakewell as Jack
- Richard Carlyle as Pa Miller
- Marion Byron as Maude
- Maurice Black as Joe
- Lionel Belmore as Morgan
- Shep Camp as Master of Ceremonies
- Ann Brody as Mrs. Fennerbeck
- George 'Gabby' Hayes as Western Union Clerk

== Songs ==
- "You Learn About Love Every Day" (Theme Song; Sung by Alice White and unidentified tenor.)
- "You're My Captain Kidd"
- "That's the Lowdown on the Lowdown"
- "Playing Around"

=== Incidental scoring ===
- "Wishing and Waiting for Love" (Theme song from one of Alice White’s previous films, "Broadway Babies")

== Preservation ==
Playing Around survives intact in the Turner Entertainment library. Also preserved in the Library of Congress collection.
