= Sadie McKee =

1934 film by Clarence Brown

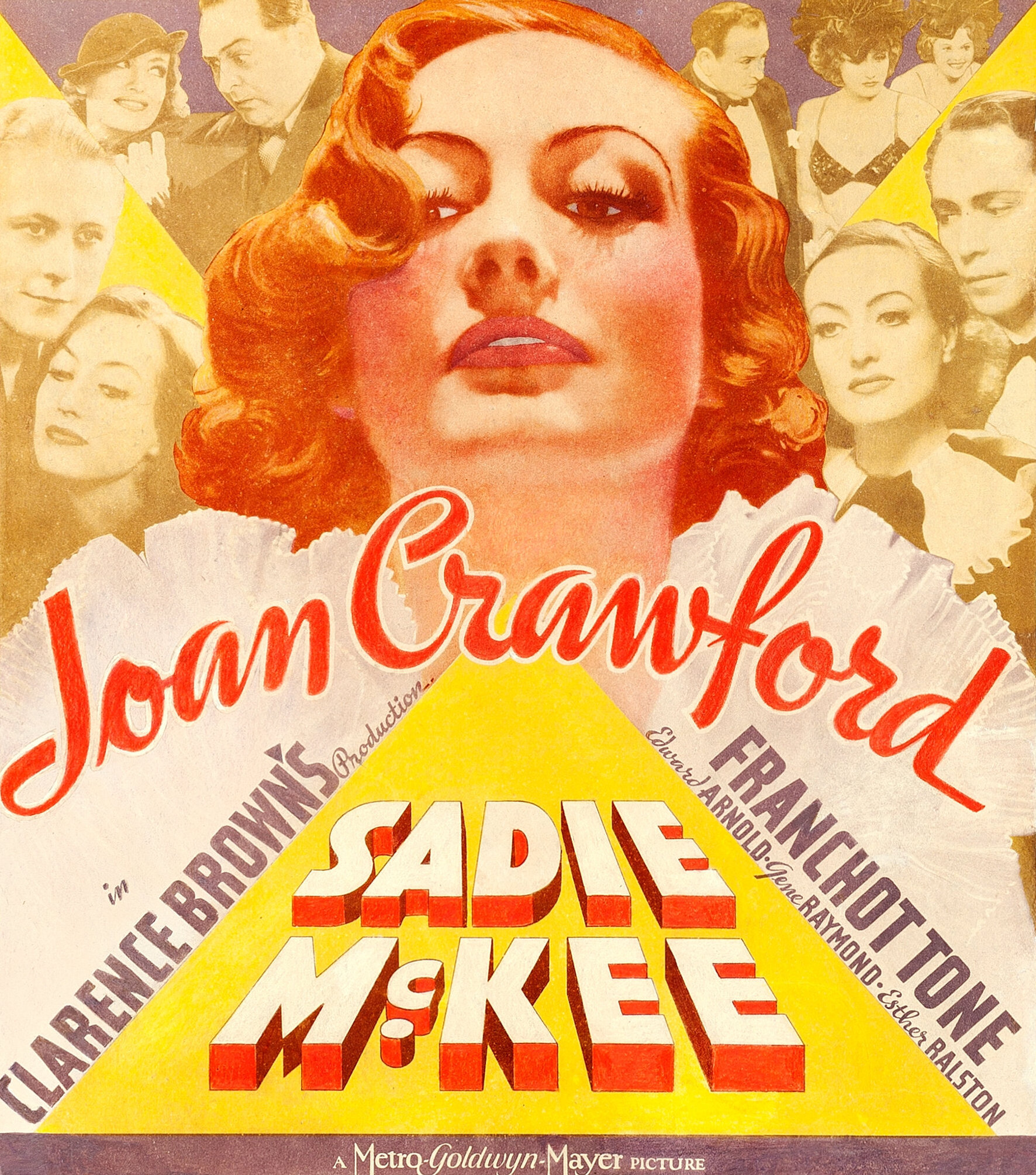
- Window card poster
- Directed by: Clarence Brown
- Screenplay by: John Meehan
- Based on: "Pretty Sadie McKee" in 1933 Liberty by Viña Delmar
- Produced by: Lawrence Weingarten
- Starring: Joan Crawford; Gene Raymond; Franchot Tone
- Cinematography: Oliver T. Marsh
- Edited by: Hugh Wynn
- Music by: Nacio Herb Brown (music); Arthur Freed (lyrics)
- Production company: Metro-Goldwyn-Mayer
- Distributed by: Loew's Inc.
- Release date: May 9, 1934
- Running time: 93 minutes
- Country: United States
- Language: English
- Budget: $612,000
- Box office: $1,302,000 (worldwide rentals)

Sadie McKee is a 1934 American pre-Code romantic-drama film directed by Clarence Brown, starring Joan Crawford, and featuring Gene Raymond, Franchot Tone, Edward Arnold, and Esther Ralston. The film is based on the 1933 short story "Pretty Sadie McKee", by Viña Delmar. Crawford plays the title character, from young working girl through poverty, a marriage into enormous wealth and finally a (seemingly) settled life on her own terms.

Sadie McKee is the third of seven films Crawford and Franchot Tone made together. At the time of filming, Crawford recently had divorced Douglas Fairbanks Jr., and soon she and Tone were involved romantically. The couple married in 1935.

The song "All I Do Is Dream of You" features in the film's opening titles and certain key sequences, sung (for the most part) by Gene Raymond. It was written by Nacio Herb Brown (music) and Arthur Freed (lyrics) for Sadie McKee. Since 1952, audiences have known this song best from its use in the film Singin' in the Rain, where it is sung at high speed by Debbie Reynolds and a group of chorus girls after Reynolds pops out of a cake at a Hollywood party. It also was used in A Night at the Opera (1935), Broadway Melody of 1936 (1935) and Crimes and Misdemeanors (1989).

As a film released in 1934 that had its copyright renewed, the film will enter the public domain on January 1, 2030. (Note: Under R275789 from the 1960 catalogs)

== Plot ==
Sadie McKee works part-time as a serving maid in the same household where her mother is a cook, and is admired by lawyer Michael Alderson, the son of her employer. However, when Michael talks badly of Tommy Wallace, her boyfriend, during a family dinner, Sadie openly denounces her employers as snobby and insensitive. Sadie then flees to New York City with Tommy, who was fired from his job in the Alderson factory for alleged cheating.

Nearly broke, Sadie and Tommy are befriended in New York by Opal, a hardened club performer, who takes them to her boardinghouse. A fadeout during goodnight kisses indicates that, despite their good intentions, they share the bed. The next morning, Sadie leaves the boardinghouse to look for a job and makes plans with Tommy to meet at the marriage license bureau at noon. Soon after she leaves, neighbor Dolly Merrick hears Tommy singing in the bathroom and seduces him into joining her traveling club act, which leaves town that morning.

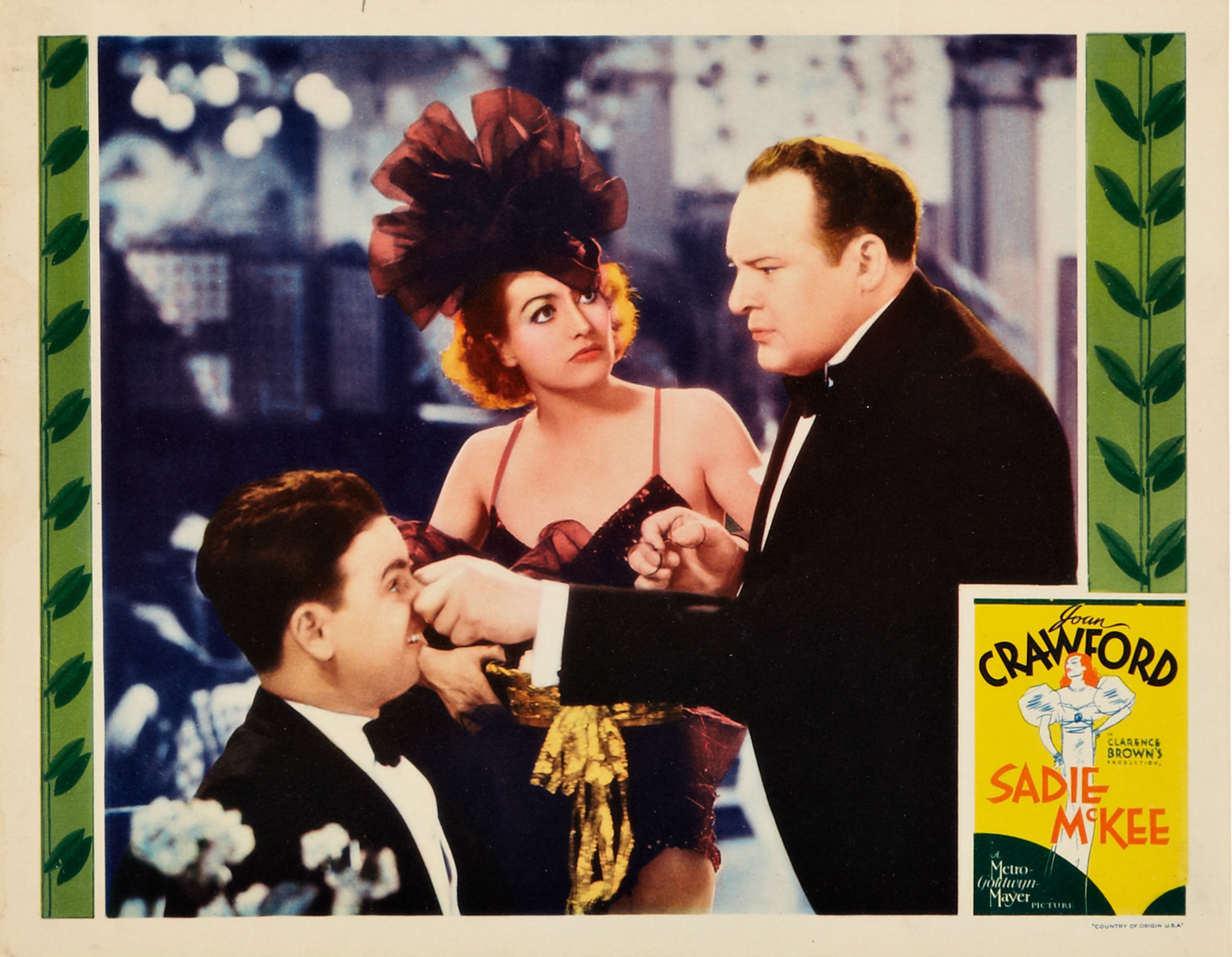
Lobby card

Heartbroken and embittered by Tommy's desertion, Sadie packs her bags, but Opal implores her to stay and gets her a job as a dancer in a nightclub. Ten days later, Jack Brennan, a jovial, rich alcoholic, helps Sadie handle an abusive customer and then demands that she sit at his table, which he is sharing with a friend – Michael Alderson. Still angry at Michael, Sadie ignores his instructions to leave his intoxicated companion alone and goes home with Brennan that evening. Soon after, Sadie marries the adoring Brennan, and while enjoying her newfound wealth, does her best to handle his constant drunkenness.

One afternoon, Sadie, who has been following Tommy's crooning career, goes to see him perform with Dolly at the Apollo Theater and is thrilled by the loving looks he gives her during his number. However, when Sadie returns home that evening, she learns from Michael and the family physician that unless Brennan stops drinking, he will die within six months. Sobered by the diagnosis, Sadie sacrifices her chance to reunite with Tommy, and after rallying the servants to her side, imprisons her husband in his house and forces him to quit drinking.

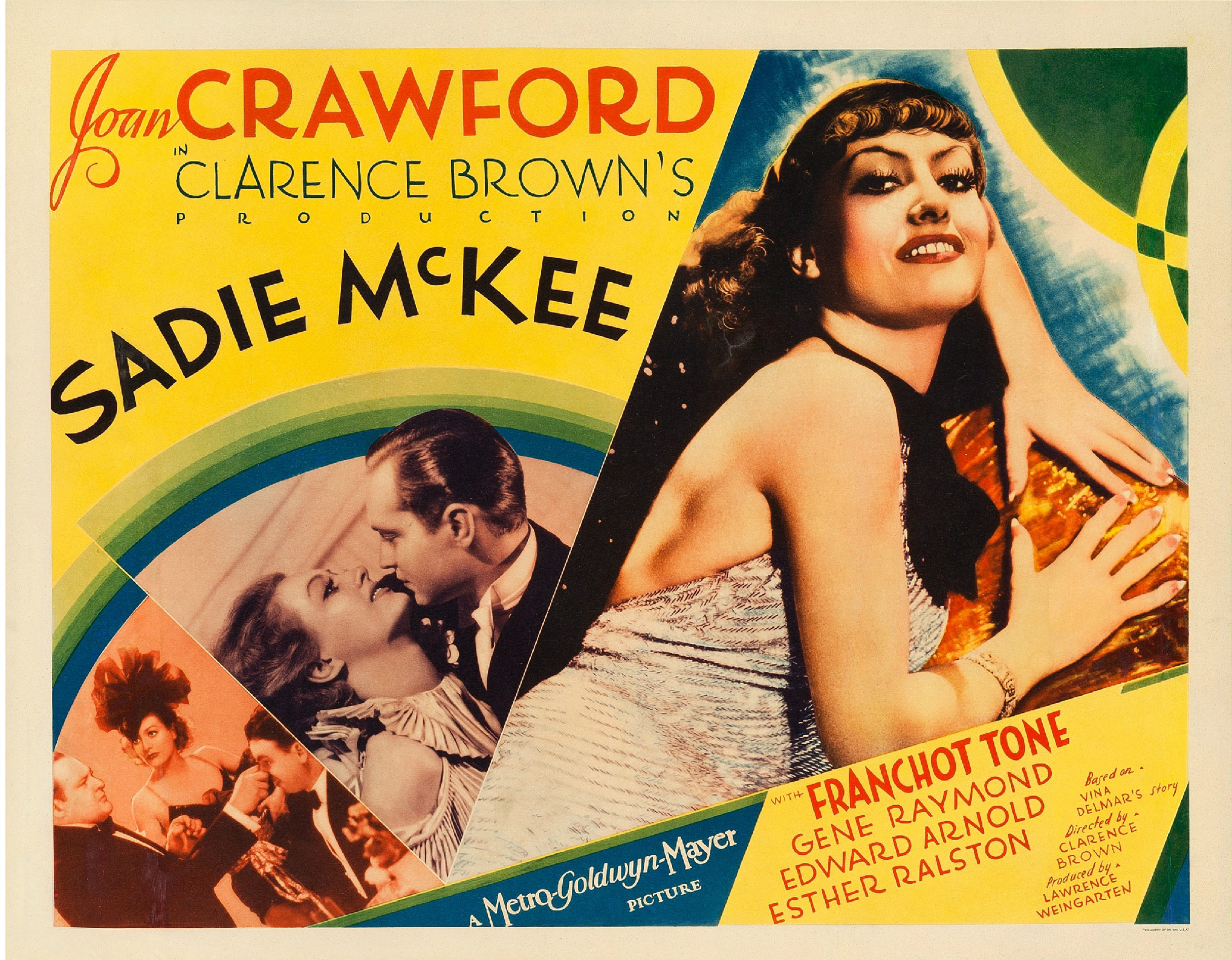
Theatrical release poster

Later, Sadie goes with Michael and the now-recovered Brennan to the club where she used to dance and is startled to see Dolly there, who is performing without Tommy. After she confronts Dolly and finds out that Tommy was dumped in New Orleans, Sadie confesses to Brennan that she is in love with another man and wants a divorce. The understanding Brennan grants Sadie her request, and Michael, anxious to win her forgiveness, undertakes to find Tommy. Michael eventually locates Tommy in the city and deduces that he is suffering from tuberculosis. Aided by Michael, Tommy is admitted to a hospital. By the time Sadie is allowed to see him, Tommy's condition has worsened, and he dies after telling her that it was Michael who had helped him. Four months later, Michael celebrates his birthday with Sadie and her mother, looks into Sadie's forgiving eyes, and then makes his birthday wish.

== Cast ==
- Joan Crawford as Sadie McKee Brennan
- Gene Raymond as Tommy Wallace
- Franchot Tone as Michael "Mike" Alderson
- Edward Arnold as Jack Brennan
- Esther Ralston as Dolly Merrick
- Earl Oxford as Stooge
- Jean Dixon as Opal
- Leo G. Carroll as Finnegan Phelps, Brennan's butler
- Akim Tamiroff as Riccori, cafe headwaiter
- Zelda Sears as Mrs. Craney, landlady
- Helen Ware as Mrs. McKee
- Gene Austin as cafe entertainer on piano
- Candy Candido as Candy, cafe entertainer (bass)
- Otto Heimel as Coco, cafe entertainer (guitar)
- Mabel Colcord as Brennan's cook

== Production notes ==
Actors James Dunn, Leif Erickson, Arthur Jarrett, Donald Woods, and Robert Young were considered for the role of Tommy Wallace. Gene Raymond eventually was cast.

Musicians Otto Heimel and Candy Candido, who were considered "the hottest boys this side of Hades", made their screen debuts as Coco and Candy in this film.

Footage from this movie is included in the 1962 film What Ever Happened to Baby Jane? to represent the 1930s acting of Joan Crawford's character Blanche Hudson.

== Reception ==
In general, the film received mixed reviews from the critics. The Hollywood Reporter noted "Swell picture...sure-fire audience...well-tailored for the talents of Miss Crawford... the stuff the fans cry for...direction of Clarence Brown something to rave about...a humdinger for femme fans."

In The New York Times, Mordaunt Hall observed "The acting is the thing ... but the story is a tawdry sample.... It is far from a pleasant story, and often a most annoying one."

The film is recognized by American Film Institute in these lists:

- 2002: AFI's 100 Years...100 Passions – Nominated
