= Colony Sports Club =

Defunct casino in London

- Location: London, England
- Opened: Early 1960s
- Owner: Meyer Lansky; Angelo Bruno

The Colony Sports Club was a London gambling casino operated by American Cosa Nostra mobsters Meyer Lansky and Philadelphia crime family boss Angelo Bruno, through front man George Raft, and low-level English gambler Alfred Salkin, who Cellini had met at another large London casino, and was used as the English front man during the 1960s.

Following the end of syndicate gambling operations in Havana by the Castro government in 1959, Lansky sought to expand his operations elsewhere. With the legalization of gambling in Great Britain, Lansky opened a number of high class gambling casinos with Bruno, including the Colony Sports Casino, throughout London during the early 1960s.

However, following an investigation by Scotland Yard, a number of casino employees, such as New York mobster Dino Cellini, Joey Napolitano, Boston Cosa Nostra mobster Richard Castucci and others were deported after finding evidence of rigging games as well as their ties to organized crime figures in New York. Another, George Raft, was not allowed to return to the UK after leaving for a holiday in the US.
