= Cynthia (film) =

1946 film by Robert Zigler Leonard

- Cynthia poster
- Directed by: Robert Z. Leonard
- Written by: Harold Buchman; Charles Kaufman; Buster Keaton
- Based on: The Rich, Full Life by Viña Delmar
- Produced by: Edwin H. Knopf
- Starring: Elizabeth Taylor; Mary Astor; George Murphy
- Cinematography: Charles Edgar Schoenbaum
- Edited by: Irvine "Cotton" Warburton
- Music by: Bronislau Kaper
- Production company: Metro-Goldwyn-Mayer
- Distributed by: Loew's Inc.
- Release date: August 29, 1947
- Running time: 98 minutes
- Country: United States
- Language: English
- Budget: $1,318,000
- Box office: $1,648,000

Cynthia is a 1947 American comedy drama film directed by Robert Z. Leonard and starring Mary Astor, Elizabeth Taylor, and George Murphy. The film is based on the 1945 play The Rich, Full Life by Viña Delmar and was adapted by screenwriters Harold Buchman and Charles Kaufman.

== Plot ==
In school, baseball hero Larry Bishop impresses a girl, Louise, and they fall in love. Both coincidentally have dreams of traveling to Vienna, Austria someday to continue their education, Larry in medicine, Louise in music.

While still in college, Louise and Larry marry, Louise becomes pregnant, and they move to Larry’s hometown in Illinois, a small town called Napoleon. He takes a job in Dingle's hardware store and they raise their daughter, Cynthia, who has chronic health problems and is quite frail. Fifteen years later, the Bishops are having trouble making ends meet, Larry can't afford to buy the home that they rent, and they no longer have any illusions about the adventurous lives they intended to lead.

Dr. Fred Jannings, Larry’s brother-in-law, has been the family's physician since Cynthia's birth, and he strongly recommends against her doing any strenuous activities. Louise ignores this advice and lets Cynthia take a role in the school musical. In a rehearsal, Cynthia sings "Melody of Spring," the music of which was adapted by Johnny Green from a song by Josef Strauss. The lyrics were written by Ralph Freed. Afterwards, Cynthia's health fails, causing Larry to be upset with his wife

Cynthia falls for a classmate, Ricky Latham, in the meantime. Louise encourages them to go together to the school prom - Cynthia's first ever date, over her husband's objections. But as the bills and worries mount, Larry loses his patience and his job one day after his boss, J.M. Dingle, objects to his coming late to work. After returning home, Larry tells Louise that they can now leave Napoleon and go to Chicago. But Louise has decided to use her money to buy the house, and Cynthia no longer wants to go either, because she is now going steady with Ricky. In the end, the family unites to embrace the future, satisfied when Larry's boss comes back, hat in hand, asking him to return to his job.

== Cast ==
- Elizabeth Taylor as Cynthia Bishop
- George Murphy as Larry Bishop
- S. Z. Sakall as Professor Rosenkrantz
- Mary Astor as Louise Bishop
- Gene Lockhart as Dr. Fred I. Jannings
- Spring Byington as Carrie Jannings
- James Lydon as Ricky Latham
- Scotty Beckett as Will Parker
- Carol Brannan as Fredonia Jannings
- Anna Q. Nilsson as Miss Brady
- Morris Ankrum as Mr. Phillips, the High-School Principal
- Kathleen Howard as McQuillan
- Shirley Johns as Stella Regan
- Barbara Challis as Alice
- Harlan Briggs as J.M. Dingle
- Will Wright as Gus Wood
- Minerva Urecal as Maid (uncredited)

== Reception ==
According to MGM records, the film earned $1,206,000 in the U.S. and Canada and $442,000 in other markets, resulting in a profit of $280,000.
