= The Cases of Mr. Ace =

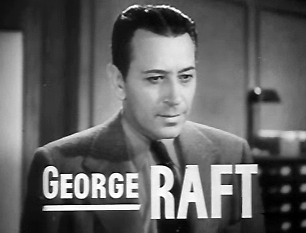
- George Raft
- Genre: Crime drama
- Running time: 30 minutes
- Country of origin: United States
- Language(s): English
- Announcer: Carlton KaDell
- Original release: 4 June – 3 September 1947

The Cases of Mr Ace is a 1947 ABC radio crime drama starring George Raft. It was an unofficial spinoff from his film Mr. Ace (1946) although it was very different from that film.

Episodes were 30 minutes long.

Raft played Eddie Ace, owner of Ace Detective Agency on Sixth Avenue in Manhattan.

The series later became the radio and TV series The Cases of Eddie Drake.
