= Pick-Up (1933 film) =

1933 film by Marion Gering

- Sylvia Sidney and George Raft
- Directed by: Marion Gering
- Written by: Viña Delmar
- Based on: magazine serial by Vina Delmar
- Produced by: B. P. Schulberg
- Starring: Sylvia Sidney; George Raft
- Cinematography: David Abel
- Music by: W. Franke Harling
- Distributed by: Paramount Pictures
- Release date: March 24, 1933
- Running time: 76 minutes
- Country: United States
- Language: English

Pick-Up is a 1933 American pre-Code crime film directed by Marion Gering and starring Sylvia Sidney and George Raft.

== Plot ==
Mary Richards gets out of prison after two years. She had been convicted with her husband, Jim, who created a badger game that she unwittingly participated in, and after their victim committed suicide. When she's let out (Jim remains) she has no resources, and she ducks into a cab driven by Harry Glynn to get out of the rain. They form a loving relationship, although they can't get married since Mary is still married to Jim. Harry creates a business fixing cars and it's a success. Harry, then, becomes attracted to Muriel- who takes advantage of the fact that Mary and Harry aren't married, and pursues Harry for fun. Harry who reciprocates. Mary is able to get the marriage to Jim annulled since he is a felon in prison and when Mary tells Harry she is finally free—he tells Mary about his interest in Muriel and that he'll always help Mary if she ever needs anything. Mary packs her things and prepares to leave Harry's house. Before she can leave, her ex-husband Jim turns up, having been paroled. He is unaware of the annulment. In the meantime, Harry has proposed marriage to Muriel who laughs at him, insinuating he isn't good enough for her and she was just playing around. Back at Harry and Mary's house, Jim indicates he is going to kill Harry, so Mary, to protect Harry, plays up to Jim, telling he is the only one for her. Jim takes Mary to a hideout and there discovers the annulment papers, He lets Mary know he actually broke out of prison and killed a cop while doing it. When Mary tries to get away, he threatens to tell the police that Mary orchestrated the prison break in order to control her. She calls the police anyway and soon the two are arrested and prosecuted. Harry sees the news in the papers, and hires an attorney to help her out. Believing she wouldn't accept his help, he makes the lawyer promise not to tell Mary that Harry is paying his fees. The prosecutor makes a big deal out of the fact that Harry "picked her up" at the time they met. Mary is acquitted and Harry meets her outside the courtroom in a cab- replaying the "pick-up" scene of their first meeting. But this time they plan to go make their relationship official.

== Cast ==
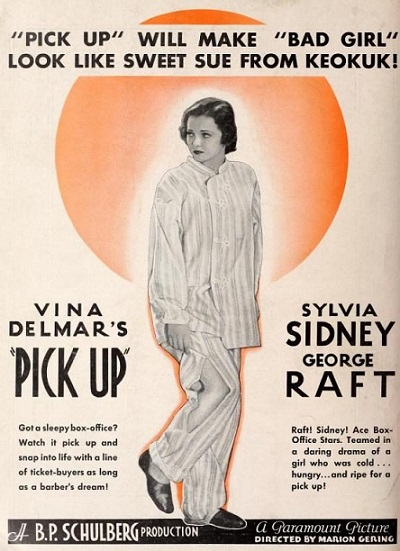
Poster for Pick-Up, starring Sylvia Sidney

- Sylvia Sidney as Mary Richards
- George Raft as Harry Glynn
- William Harrigan as Jim Richards
- Lilian Bond as Muriel Stevens (billed as Lillian Bond)
- Clarence Wilson as Sam Foster
- George Meeker as Artie Logan
- Louise Beavers as Magnolia

== Production ==
The film was based on a short story by Vina Delmar which was voted one of the best short stories of 1928–29.

Film rights were bought by Paramount who announced in May 1932 the film would star Carole Lombard and George Raft. Then Raft was replaced by Gary Cooper. Eventually in October 1932 Sylvia Sidney and George Raft were cast, Raft replacing Cooper, who had been held up making a movie at MGM. Raft and Sidney would reteam several times.

In September Courtney Terret was working on the script.

Marion Gering was assigned to direct in November 1932.

Filming took place in early 1933.

The posters' Pre-Code tagline was "Pick-Up will make Bad Girl look like Sweet Sue from Keokuk!"

== Reception ==
The film was a box office hit. The New York Times called it "a good example of a mediocre story which derives a measure of effectiveness from the engaging personalities of its stars."
