= I'm the Law =

- Genre: Police drama
- Developed by: Cosman Productions; Television Corporation of America
- Directed by: Jean Yarbrough; George Archainbaud; Robert G. Walker
- Starring: George Raft
- Country of origin: United States
- Original language: English
- No. of seasons: 1
- No. of episodes: 26

Production
- Executive producers: Pat Costello; Lou Costello
- Production locations: New York City, United States
- Editor: William Austin
- Running time: 25 mins.

Original release
- Release: February 13 – July 31, 1953

I'm the Law is the title of a 30-minute syndicated American television police drama series which aired in 1953 starring George Raft as Lt. George Kirby, a New York Police Department detective involved in solving a variety of crimes in New York City.

Filming began in March 1952.

The series first aired on February 13, 1953 and ended on July 31, 1953. It was filmed at Hal Roach Studios by a production company owned by Lou Costello. Costello's brother, Pat, was the executive producer. Jean Yarbrough was the director. The series was distributed by MCA-TV.

== Cast and guest stars ==
Besides Raft, Rochelle Hudson and Gordon Jones were members of the show's cast. Other actors seen on the program included those indicated in the table below.

Actor	Role	Appearances
June Vincent	Dorothy Hill	2 episodes
Lawrence Dobkin	Fred Harms	2 episodes
J. Anthony Hughes	Police officer	2 episodes
Frank Marlowe	Murderer	2 episodes
Robert Bice	Detective Bill	2 episodes
Rex Lease	Officer Johnny	2 episodes

== Reception ==
The New York Times TV critic said Raft's "show is not bad at all, at least not by the TV standard for detective stories... Mr Raft is still playing Mr Raft... however his limited histrionic abilities in some way work to his advantage."
