= George Raft =

American actor (1901–1980)

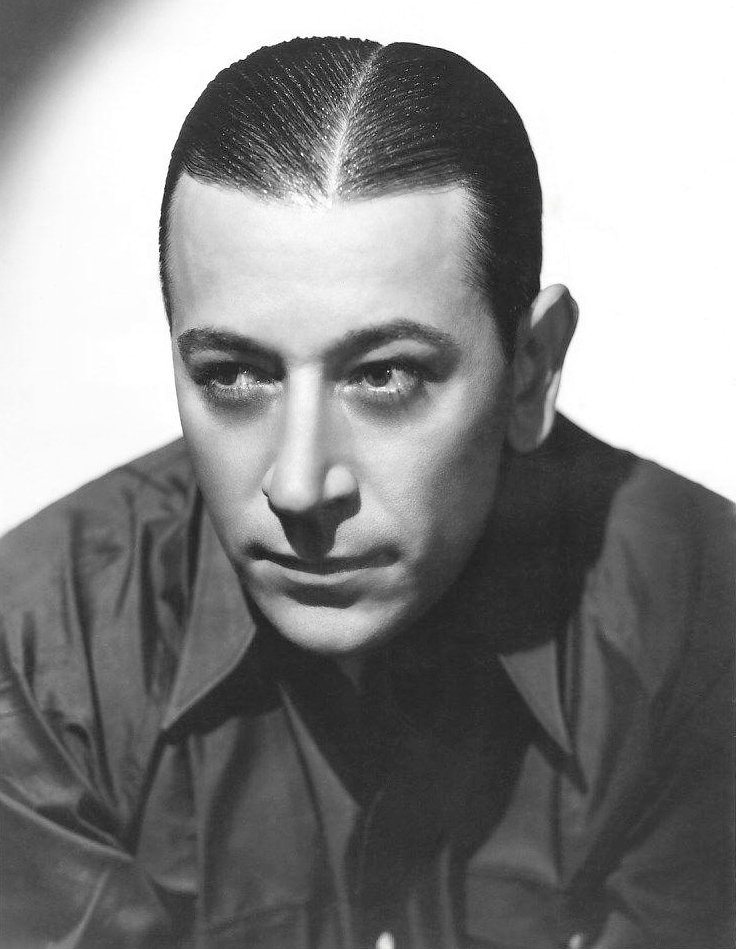
- Raft in 1935
- Born: George Ranft; September 26, 1901; Hell's Kitchen, New York City, U.S.
- Died: November 24, 1980 (aged 79); Los Angeles, California, U.S.
- Occupations: Actor; dancer; film producer
- Years active: 1924–1980
- Spouse: Grace Mulrooney (m. 1923; died 1970)

George Raft (né Ranft; September 26, 1901 – November 24, 1980) was an American film actor and dancer identified with portrayals of gangsters in crime melodramas of the 1930s and the 1940s. A stylish leading man in dozens of movies, Raft is remembered for his gangster roles in Quick Millions (1931) with Spencer Tracy, Scarface (1932) with Paul Muni, Each Dawn I Die (1939) with James Cagney, Invisible Stripes (1939) with Humphrey Bogart, and Billy Wilder's comedy Some Like It Hot (1959) with Marilyn Monroe, Tony Curtis and Jack Lemmon; and as a dancer in Bolero (1934) with Carole Lombard and a truck driver in They Drive by Night (1940) with Ann Sheridan, Ida Lupino and again with Bogart.

Raft's association with organized crime figures resulted in controversy throughout his life, and led to a ban from Great Britain in 1967.

== Early life and career ==
Raft was born at 415 West 41st Street in Hell's Kitchen, Manhattan, New York City, the son of Eva (née Glockner), a German immigrant, and Conrad Ranft, who was born in Massachusetts to German immigrants. His parents were married on November 17, 1895, in Manhattan. Raft's sister Eva, known as Katie, was born on April 18, 1896. Raft's grandfather had emigrated from Germany and worked on merry-go-rounds and prospected for gold. His father worked in carnivals before settling in New York.

Most obituaries cited Raft's year of birth as 1895, which he stated was correct when he appeared on The Mike Douglas Show seven months prior to his death. However, Raft is recorded in the New York City Birth Index as having been born on September 26, 1901, in Manhattan as "George Rauft" (although "Rauft" is likely a mistranscription of "Ranft"). The 1900 census for New York City lists his sister Katie as his parents' only child, with two children born and only one living. In the 1910 census, he is listed as eight years old.

Raft grew up on 41st Street and worked as an errand boy and a fishwrapper after school. His parents sent him to live at his grandparents' house on 164th Street. He left school at the age of 12, and left home at 13. He worked as an apprentice electrician for a year, then boxed professionally for two years beginning at the age of 15. As Dutch Rauft, he fought 14 bouts, with nine victories, three defeats and two draws. Another account says that Raft fought 25 bouts and was knocked out seven times.

Raft played minor-league baseball, reportedly with Springfield of the Eastern League, as a utility outfielder with pitching aspirations. However, his batting was poor and he was dropped.

"I was just trying to find something that I liked that would make me a living," said Raft later. "I saw guys fighting, so I fought. I saw guys playing ball, so I played ball. Then I saw guys dancing... and getting paid for it!"

=== Career as a dancer ===
Raft's mother taught him how to dance, and he danced at outdoor amusement parks and carnivals with his parents. Following his baseball career, he began working as a taxi dancer in the poorer sections of New York. At first he struggled financially, but then he won a Charleston competition and was launched professionally.

Raft started performing exhibition dances in the afternoon at Healy's, Murray's, Rectors and Churchills in New York. He then started working in New York City nightclubs, often in the same venues as did Rudolph Valentino before Valentino became a film actor. Raft had a notable collaboration with Elsie Pilcer. A May 1924 review in Variety called him "gifted."

"I could have been the first X-rated dancer," he said later. "I was very erotic. I used to caress myself as I danced. I never felt I was a great dancer. I was more of a stylist, unique. I was never a Fred Astaire or a Gene Kelly, but I was sensuous."

Raft went on tour as a dancer and helped popularize the tango in Paris, Vienna, Rome, London and New York. He had a great success as a dancer in London in 1926, and the Duke of Windsor was "an ardent fan and supporter." Fred Astaire, in his autobiography Steps in Time (1959), wrote that Raft was a lightning-fast dancer and did "the fastest Charleston I ever saw." A September 1926 edition of Variety spoke of Raft's reputation as "the best Charleston dancer in New York."

During this time, Raft befriended a number of gangsters, including Enoch Johnson and Larry Fay, and he would occasionally drive for Owney Madden. A boyhood friend of gangster Benjamin "Bugsy" Siegel, and later a "wheel man" for the mob, Raft acknowledged having narrowly avoided a life of crime.

=== Broadway ===
Raft became part of the stage act of flamboyant speakeasy and nightclub hostess Texas Guinan at the 300 Club, and he also produced some of her shows.

His success led him to Broadway, where he again worked as a dancer. His stage performances included The City Chap (October 1925) (with music by Jerome Kern), Gay Paree, Madhattan, Palm Beach Nights (also known as No Foolin') and Padlocks of 1927 (1927). He was called "the fastest Charleston dancer."

Raft later starred in the film Broadway (1942), a fictionalized account of his life when he was working the Paramount-Publix circuit and performing in stage shows that were presented before movies.

== Los Angeles and early films ==
Owney Madden told Raft that he should be in motion pictures, and Raft decided to try to break into film acting after being threatened by the husband of a woman whom he had been seeing. In 1927, Raft relocated to Hollywood, where he first danced in clubs to pay the bills.

In October 1928, Raft appeared in a stage show presented by Texas Guinan called Night Club. The Los Angeles Times said Raft "scores a tremendous individual hit." Variety wrote that Raft appeared at the climax when he "came to the front and did his eccentric dance routine, which he climaxed with the hottest black bottom ever. He goaled the audience, being the big punch of the show."

=== Film debut ===
Raft's screen debut was in Queen of the Night Clubs starring Guinan, who insisted Raft have a small role. Although Raft's scenes were cut, a Variety review said "...a nite club scene introduces George Raft, the hot stepper, as the m. c. and band leader, being brought down for one of his rip-snorting hoofing specialties." Raft also appeared in stage shows supporting the film. One reviewer called him "a clever dancer". Queen of the Night Clubs is considered a lost film.

Raft followed this with small roles in Gold Diggers of Broadway and Side Street. His dancing skills were noticed by director Rowland Brown, who cast him in a substantial supporting gangster role as Spencer Tracy's character's sidekick in Quick Millions (1931). Raft's appearances in these films were followed by Goldie with Spencer Tracy and Jean Harlow, Hush Money with Joan Bennett, and the Eddie Cantor musical Palmy Days.

In Taxi! (1932), starring James Cagney and Loretta Young, Raft had a colorful unbilled dancing role as Cagney's competitor in a dance contest, who wins only to be knocked down by Cagney. He was third-billed in an extremely large role as a gangster in Dancers in the Dark (1932), below Miriam Hopkins as a dancer and Jack Oakie as a bandleader.

Raft said he never regarded himself as an actor. "I wanted to be me," he said.

=== Scarface ===
Raft's big break came when he was cast as the second lead alongside Paul Muni in Howard Hawks's Scarface. In the film, he plays Guino Rinaldo, the second-in-command to Muni’s Tony Camonte, who falls in love with Camonte's sister and is murdered by him. Raft's performance is notable for his character's habit of flipping a coin, which became an iconic trope in gangster films; while others claimed credit for the mannerism, writer W.R. Burnett confirmed that it was Raft who invented it. Burnett said: "He realized he wasn't a good actor, which he wasn't. But he knew if he reacted to what other people said, he was effective."

Scarface was filmed in September 1931. It was released by United Artists in 1932. It became a hit and made Raft a star. He said: "That was the big one. People remembered me. I was getting real fan mail – by the bushel basket – and even a dumb kid from 10th Avenue could figure out how to translate that into money."

After filming Scarface, Raft made Night World (1932) at Universal, supporting Lew Ayres, and Love Is a Racket, directed by William Wellman, although all of Raft's scenes were eventually cut.

=== Paramount ===
Raft signed a contract with Paramount in March 1932. The following month, he was cast in a supporting role in Madame Racketeer (1932), and contemporary reports referred to his "menacing suavity." He was announced for Ladies of the Big House with Sylvia Sidney and Gene Raymond.

=== Night After Night (1932) ===
When Scarface was released, public response was so strong that Raft was offered the lead role in a film based on a story by Louis Bromfeld, originally titled Number 55 and then changed to Night After Night (1932). When the studio adamantly refused to hire Texas Guinan, upon whom one of the film's characters is based, because of her age, Raft advocated for his friend Mae West to be cast in a supporting role in his first film as leading man.

Raft was one of several Paramount stars who appeared in the episodic comedy/drama If I Had a Million (1932), playing a forger hiding from police who is suddenly given a million dollars with no place to cash the check. He starred in Under-Cover Man (1932) and was announced for Bodyguard, which was never made. He next appeared in Pick Up (1933). A natural practitioner of a form of method acting, Raft told Variety:

I don't know what I do, but it's not acting. It's me. Supposing I'm supposed to hate a guy. Then I think of somebody I hate and visualize him instead of the actor. Same way when I'm supposed to be in love with the heroine. I think of a girl I could be crazy about and though I'm saying to the actress "I love you, darling", all the time I keep thinking of the other party.

=== First suspension ===
Raft refused to appear in The Story of Temple Drake (1933) with Miriam Hopkins, as he did not want to play a sadist. He was replaced by Jack La Rue, who had been originally cast for Raft's role in Scarface. Raft was placed on suspension in February.

He said: "It's not that I mind being the guy on the wrong side of the law. But I won't take a role that's pure heel. The character has to have some ray of warmth, some redeeming quality – or it just isn't real."

The Story of Temple Drake performed poorly at the box office and was believed to have hurt La Rue's career. Raft was removed from suspension in April 1933, and he returned to Hollywood to appear in Midnight Club (1933), set in London.

=== The Bowery (1933) ===
Raft was borrowed by Twentieth Century Pictures, a new production company established by Darryl F. Zanuck (former head of production at Warner Bros.). He appeared in the studio's first film, Raoul Walsh's highly popular and energetic period piece The Bowery, as Steve Brodie, supposedly the first man to jump off the Brooklyn Bridge and survive. Raft plays the second lead to Wallace Beery as a flamboyant saloon owner who competes with Raft for Fay Wray's character as well as Pert Kelton as a singer/dancer.

Back at Paramount, Raft supported Fredric March and Miriam Hopkins in All of Me (1934), which was not popular. Zanuck wanted him for Blood Money, but Raft was too busy at Paramount.

=== Bolero (1934) ===
Raft was meant to appear in It's a Pleasure to Lose, based on the life of Nick the Greek, but instead was slated to star in Bolero (1934), playing a dancer with Carole Lombard. Raft initially refused the film until it was re-written, and the studio suspended him, but Raft eventually made the film, which became a great success. The New York Times wrote: "Raft is a vivid and pictorially interesting type, rather than an actor in the technical sense, and consequently he proves unequal to the full implications of the fame-hungry dancer. The exterior attractiveness which Mr. Raft brings to the rôle gives 'Bolero' considerable color, nevertheless."

In March 1934, Raft was suspended a second time for having refused the male lead in Mae West's It Ain't No Sin (later changed to Belle of the Nineties) because his part was subordinate to West's. In May 1934, Raft signed a new contract with Paramount to reflect his star status.

Raft next appeared in The Trumpet Blows (1934), playing a matador. The film was an attempt to invoke Valentino's Blood and Sand, and for a time, Raft was promoted as a "second Valentino." Raft walked out on the film unhappy with his role, but later returned after re-writes were made. The film was a box-office disappointment.

Raft then starred in Limehouse Blues (1934) with Anna May Wong. In February 1934, he admitted to having been involved in three fights during his career as a dancer and actor, including one in which he hit the producer of Bolero. In August 1934, Raft was involved in a brawl at the Hollywood Brown Derby. At the end of 1934, Raft was listed in a survey of theater managers as among Paramount's secondary tier of stars "if properly cast."

In Rumba (1935), Raft was reunited with Lombard. He also starred in Stolen Harmony (1935) and was slated to appear in Gambler's Maxim from a story by James Edward Grant, but the film was not made.

=== The Glass Key (1935) ===
Raft starred in a brutal and fast-paced adaptation of Dashiell Hammett's The Glass Key (1935). He tried a comedy, Every Night at Eight (1935), and was borrowed by Columbia Pictures to appear in She Couldn't Take It (1935), a comedy in the vein of It Happened One Night (1934). He then was borrowed by 20th Century-Fox for It Had to Happen (1936) and starred in Paramount's Yours for the Asking (1936).

Raft was meant to team with Lombard for a third time in The Princess Comes Across (1936), but refused to make the film as he was unhappy with the choice of cameraman. He was replaced by Fred MacMurray and was suspended again in February 1936. He was scheduled to star in You and Me, the directorial debut of Norman Krasna, but he refused to work for a first-time director. Raft was put on suspension and $24,000 of his salary was withheld. In October 1936, he reconciled with Paramount and the studio returned his $24,000.

=== Souls at Sea (1937) ===
Raft was offered a part opposite the studio's top male star Gary Cooper in Souls at Sea (1937), directed by Henry Hathaway. Raft originally turned it down as his character was a coward, leaving Paramount and his $4,000-per-week contract in November 1936, though the contract still had two years remaining. Samuel Goldwyn wanted Raft for the film version of Dead End and Universal, David O. Selznick and 20th Century Fox were keen on using Raft. Lloyd Nolan was announced as Raft's replacement in Souls at Sea. Raft was discussing a three-films-per-year deal with United Artists for three years, to start with Dead End. However, Raft agreed to return to Paramount and Souls at Sea when his part was re-written to be more sympathetic. Souls at Sea was a great hit, and in 1937 Raft was the third-highest-paid star in Hollywood (behind Cooper and Warner Baxter), earning $202,666. In May 1937, Raft reportedly tested for the role of Rhett Butler for the film Gone with the Wind.

Paramount announced Raft for Millions for Defense with Ray Milland and Frances Farmer, a film about the Barbary War, but the picture was not made. Instead, Raft appeared with Sylvia Sidney in Fritz Lang's drama You and Me (1938), and was next reunited with Hathaway to star in another adventure story, Spawn of the North (1938), with Henry Fonda and John Barrymore playing supporting roles.

Raft was announced for the films The World Applauds and Two-Time Loser.

Paramount wanted Raft to appear in St. Louis Blues, but he refused and was replaced by Lloyd Nolan. "Raft is Hollywood's authority on walk outs," wrote one columnist. He was suspended again, then allowed to do a comedy, The Lady's from Kentucky (1939). In January 1939, he refused to make The Magnificent Fraud and was again replaced by Nolan. Raft's contract was meant to last until February of that year, but Paramount ended it prematurely.

=== Warner Bros: 1939–1943 ===
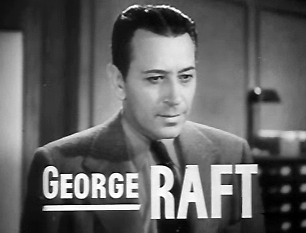
Raft in Invisible Stripes (1939)

Raft received an offer from Warner Bros. to appear opposite James Cagney in a prison film titled Each Dawn I Die (1939); the film was a great success and Warner Bros. offered Raft a long-term contract in July 1939 at three films per year. He next appeared in I Stole a Million (1939) for Universal.

Hal Wallis later wrote that "Our association with Raft was a constant struggle from start to finish. Hypersensitive to public accusations of underworld connections, he flatly refused to play the heavy in any film... Time and time again we offered him gangster parts and time and time again he turned them down."

Raft was slated to appear in a remake of The Patent Leather Kid, one of his favorite films, and a John Dillinger film with Cagney, but both projects were canceled. He was assigned to Invisible Stripes (1939) with William Holden, Jane Bryan and Humphrey Bogart. Raft was borrowed by Walter Wanger to play a gangster in The House Across the Bay (1940), which was a flop. He was cast in City for Conquest (1940), but declined the role and was replaced by Anthony Quinn.

Raft was scheduled to appear in Star of Africa and declined a role in The Dealer's Name Was George, but neither film was made.

In Raoul Walsh's trucking melodrama They Drive by Night (1940), Raft played the lead, with Ann Sheridan as Raft's leading lady, Humphrey Bogart in a supporting role as his brother, and Ida Lupino as a ravishing young beauty relentlessly pursuing Raft. In July 1940, Raft reprised his vaudeville act.

In August 1940, Raft declined the lead role in South of Suez (1940) and was replaced by George Brent. He was again placed on suspension, but was intended to appear in The Sea Wolf (1941) after the suspension period. However, Raft did not like the role and was suspended again, with John Garfield taking his place. MGM intended to borrow Raft to costar with Norma Shearer in The World We Make, but the film was never made.

Raft also declined the leads in High Sierra and The Maltese Falcon (1941), and both roles were played by Bogart, catapulting Bogart's career. Raft instead made Manpower (1941) with Edward G. Robinson and Marlene Dietrich. Robinson recalled Raft as "touchy, difficult and thoroughly impossible to play with." During filming, Raft and Robinson came to blows, with photographs splashed across newspapers.

Raft next rejected the lead role in All Through the Night (1942), refusing to appear on the first day of filming because he did not want to play a heel, and Bogart once again replaced him. Raft was unable to accept Fox's offer to appear in To the Shores of Tripoli (1942).

Raft wanted to appear in Universal's film version of the musical Broadway (1942), but Jack Warner refused to loan him, so Raft spent eight months on suspension without pay. However, Warner Bros. could only maintain the suspension while making films that Raft declined, and the studio eventually ran out of such films, forcing them to resume paying him, and they eventually agreed to let him make Broadway, playing a fictionalized version of himself as a young dancer named George Raft.

Raft said that he paid $27,500 of his own money so that Warner Bros. could borrow Robert Cummings from Universal for another film. Raft was reported to have turned down Bogart's role in Casablanca (1942), although according to some Warner Bros. memos, this story is apocryphal. Raft was discussed as a possibility for the lead at one stage, as was Ronald Reagan, but was never offered it.

Raft was one of many Warner Bros. stars who appeared in United Artists' Stage Door Canteen (1943). He finally returned to filming at Warner Bros. with the espionage thriller Background to Danger (1943), a film intended to capitalize on the success of Casablanca. In November 1942, Raft bought himself out of his Warner Bros. contract in order to appear in Hell's Kitchen, a story of his life, on stage, but the play never materialized.

=== Freelance star and producer ===
Raft's career as a freelance actor initially began well. He toured the U.S., England and Africa performing for the troops from January through March 1944. In March 1943, he was voted the sixth-most-popular star among African-American movie audiences; Variety said: "Raft has always been a prime favorite with the Negro filmgoer." His price as a guest star on radio was $1,500-$2,500.

Raft declined the lead role in Billy Wilder's Double Indemnity (1944). Wilder later said "We knew then that we'd have a good picture" and Raft later admitted that "I wasn't very intelligent then." Raft's first film after leaving Warner Bros. was the 1944 Universal musical Follow the Boys (1944), which featured a number of Universal's stars in a guest spots and Raft in the lead. It achieved a healthy gross. 20th Century Fox hired him to a contract so that he could appear in Henry Hathaway's hit musical Nob Hill (1945), replacing Fred MacMurray.

=== Edwin Marin ===
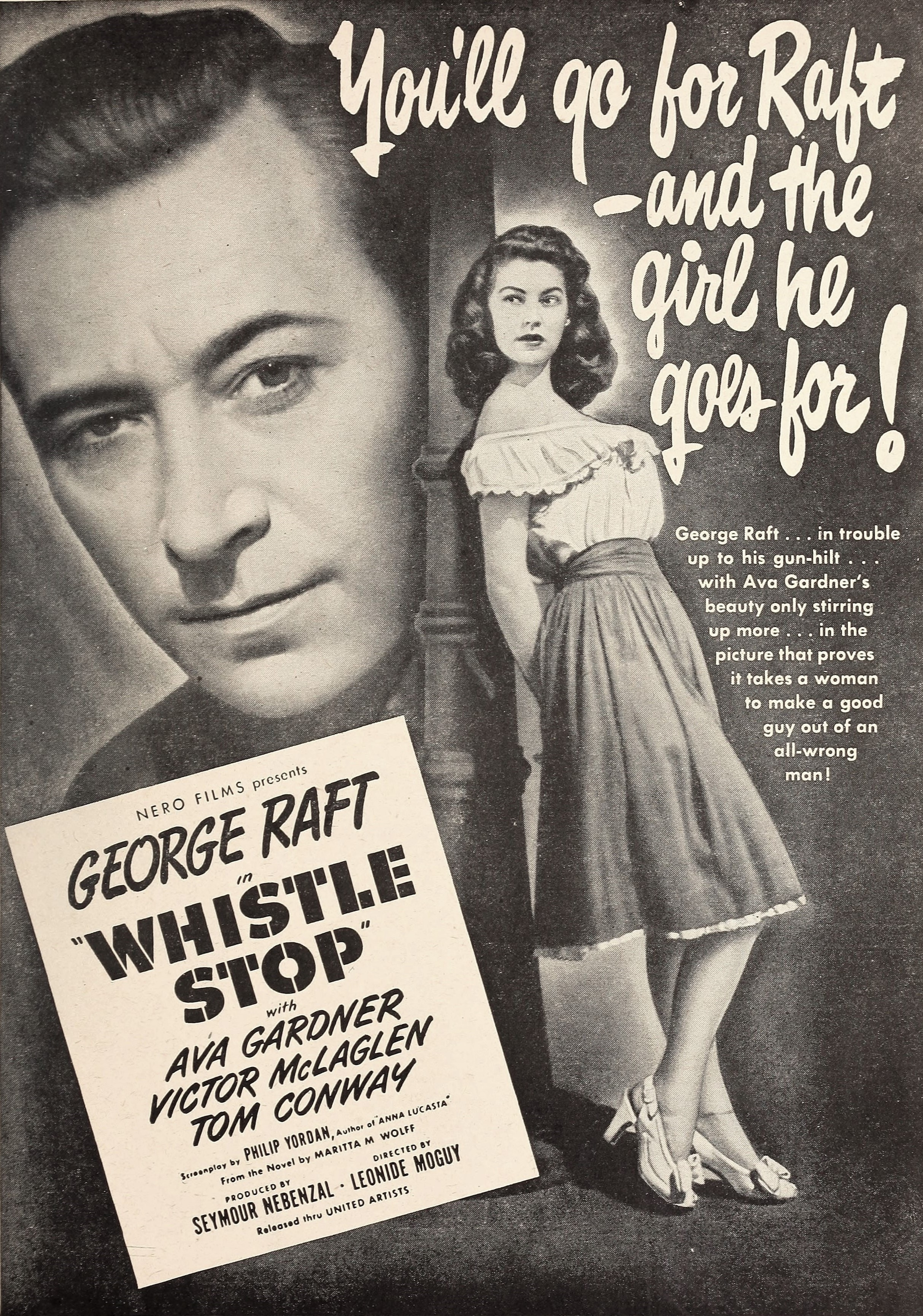
Whistle Stop (1946) with Ava Gardner

Raft next appeared in director Edwin Marin's Johnny Angel (1945) for RKO, an unexpected hit that realized a profit of more than a million dollars. He next appeared in the popular Whistle Stop (1946), a United Artists melodrama that offered a good early role to Ava Gardner. Mr. Ace (1946), with Sylvia Sidney and director Marin for producer Benedict Bogeaus, was a flop, but it did lead to a rather successful radio series starring Raft entitled The Cases of Mr. Ace (1947).

In 1946, Raft earned a reported $108,000 for the year. He created his own production company, Star Films, with Sam Bischoff as president, and planned to make three films in two years for $3.5 million. He and Marin returned to RKO to make the popular film noir Nocturne (1946), produced by Joan Harrison.

Raft's next three films were all directed by Marin: Christmas Eve (1947) at United Artists for Bogeaus, a box-office disappointment, Intrigue (1947) at United Artists for Star Films and Race Street (1948) at RKO.

In June 1947, Raft received bad publicity when his friend, the Las Vegas mobster Bugsy Siegel, was murdered. However, the following year, Hedda Hopper wrote that Raft was "going stronger than ever today" adding that "he has made millions, but hasn't got 'em due to a fondness for gambling and a loyalty to helping old friends."

=== Decline as a star ===
Star Film's second film was Outpost in Morocco (1949), a story of the French Foreign Legion partly shot on location in Africa that was a box-office disappointment. Raft followed this with a series of thrillers: Johnny Allegro (1949), directed by Ted Tetzlaff for Columbia, Red Light (1949), by Roy Del Ruth for United Artists and A Dangerous Profession (1949) by Tetzlaff for RKO. None of these performed strongly at the box office, and Raft's standing as a box-office attraction had been damaged. The lengthy period of shooting for Johnny Allegro caused him to miss the chance to star in The Big Steal (1949), and he was replaced by Robert Mitchum.

Raft went to England to make I'll Get You for This, which was filmed in 1950 but not released for another year. In the summer of 1951, Raft took the title role in the radio adventure series Rocky Jordan, playing "the owner of a cabaret in Cairo whose life is steeped in intrigue." However, it only lasted a few months.

==== Three films for Lippert Pictures ====
Raft appeared in two Lippert Pictures low-budget thrillers, Escape Route (1952), shot in England with Sally Gray, and Loan Shark (1952).

He starred in a syndicated television series titled I'm the Law (1953) that ran for one season. The Man from Cairo (1953), also for Lippert and shot in Europe and Africa, was Raft's last film with top billing. He resumed his dancing career, including an exhibition in Las Vegas. "As far as films are concerned, I'm dead," he said, "Nobody has been breaking their necks trying to hire me." He tried to persuade Darryl Zanuck to remake The Honor System. He said: "I want to play heavies again. I think I made a mistake going straight."

=== Supporting actor ===
Raft took the role as a mob boss Dan Beaumonte supporting Robert Taylor in Rogue Cop (1954), a hit for MGM. Also popular was Black Widow (1954), a film noir with Ginger Rogers, but A Bullet for Joey (1955), which reunited Raft with Edward G. Robinson, was a flop.

Raft was one of many guest stars in Around the World in 80 Days (1956), and after the film's release, he said that "the telephone just seemed to stop ringing." He decided to seek other work.

=== Television ===
In 1953 Raft appeared as NYPD detective Lt. George Kirby on 27 episodes of I'm the Law, a police drama series. He spoofed his tough-guy image in a comedy sketch on the Feb. 20, 1955 episode of The Jack Benny Program. He appeared in 3 episodes of The Red Skelton Show, portraying gangster-types in comedy skits. In 1964 he performed a tango dance with the Hugh Lambert dancers to the song "La Cumparsita" on an episode of The Ed Sullivan Show. In 1967 he did an episode of the Batman, “Black Widow Strikes Again”. In 1971 he twice appeared on Rowan & Martin's Laugh-In comedy show, and in one episode of the sitcom The Chicago Teddy Bears, which was his last TV acting role.

== Later career ==
=== Casinos ===
In 1955, Raft was offered the chance to buy a 2% share in the Flamingo Hotel for $65,000 if he would act as its entertainment director. Raft agreed, but was rejected for a gaming license because of his alleged associations with underworld figures. He appealed, arguing that although he knew many gangsters, "I never did business with any of them," and the decision was overturned in December 1955. Raft worked at the hotel negotiating its showbusiness deals.

Raft was hired by Santo Trafficante, Jr. to work as a greeter at the Capri Casino in Havana, Cuba, at which he was also a part owner. However, Fidel Castro took command of the country and closed all of its casinos, and Raft was in Havana on the night when the rebels arrived.

=== Return to filmmaking ===
In July 1958, Raft was offered a role in his first film in four years, Some Like It Hot (1959), playing a gangster. Because of Marilyn Monroe's tardiness on set, the job turned into 16 weeks of work before Raft was able to appear in Jet Over the Atlantic (1959). The success of Some Like It Hot did not lead to a comeback, but Raft subsequently appeared as a casino owner in the Rat Pack movie Ocean's 11 (1960), and he appeared in a cameo role as himself in The Ladies Man (1961). In Britain, he appeared in Two Guys Abroad (1962), a film intended as a pilot for a television series, and back in Hollywood had small roles in For Those Who Think Young and The Patsy (both 1964).

=== London ===
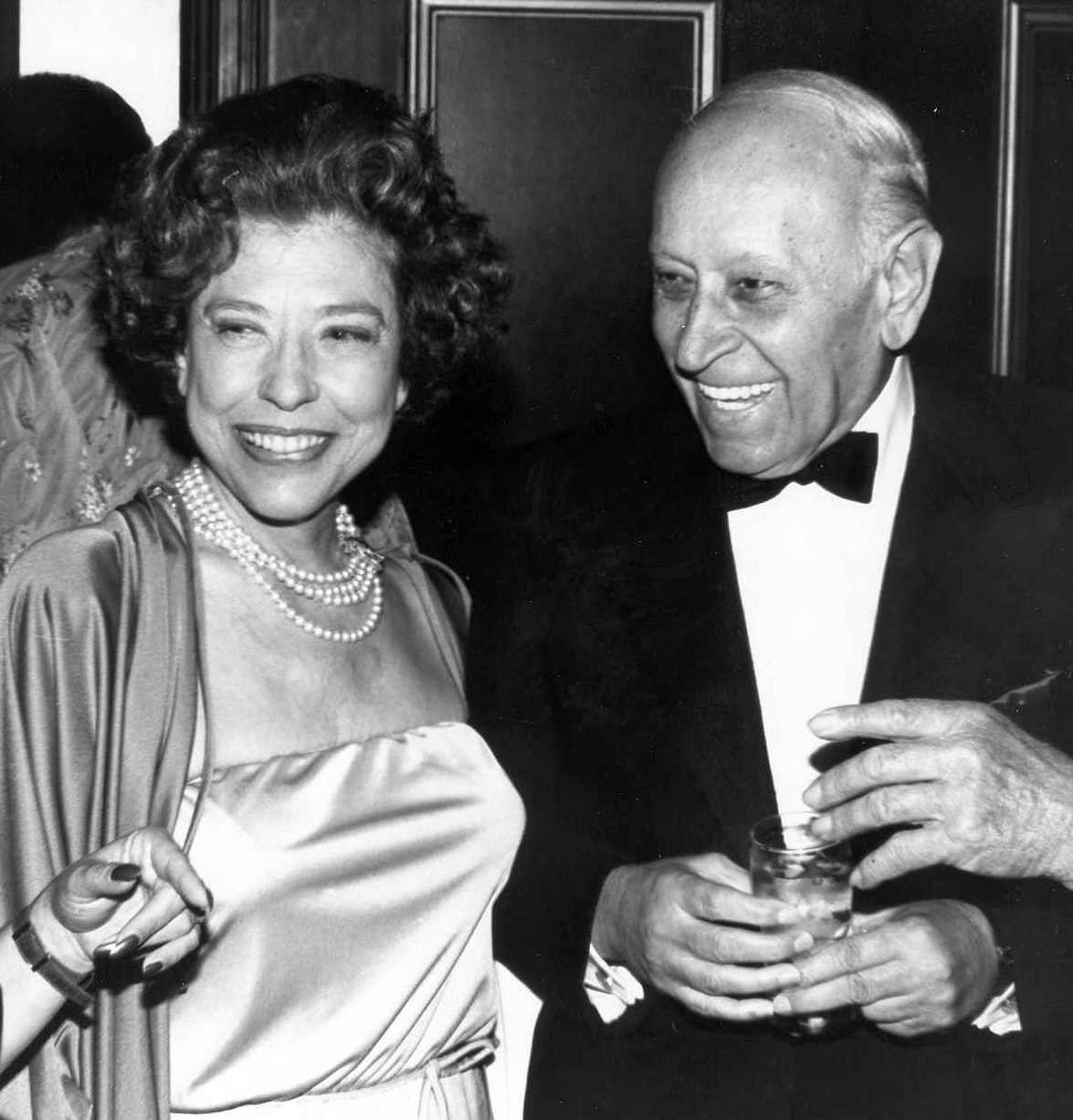
Judy Canova and Raft in 1979

Raft received an offer from Andy Neatrour to work as a host and part owner of a gambling club in London called the Colony Club. He went to London in 1966, and while there, he took parts in several films, including a cameo role in the 1967 James Bond spoof Casino Royale, the French film The Upper Hand (1966) with Jean Gabin and Five Golden Dragons (1967). Although the gambling club was successful, after having returned from the U.S. in 1967 for a trip home, Raft was banned from reentering the UK as an "undesirable."

Raft's later films included Skidoo and Madigan's Millions (both 1968). However, Raft became ill during the making of Madigan's Millions, and he was replaced by Cesar Romero in the title role. None of Raft's scenes remain in the film.

In the early 1970s, Raft appeared in an Alka-Seltzer television commercial as a prison inmate, worked as a goodwill ambassador for the Riviera in Las Vegas and sold his house to move into an apartment in Century City.

Raft's final film appearances were in Hammersmith Is Out (1972), Sextette (1978), in which he reunited with Mae West, and The Man with Bogart's Face (1980), a nod to 1940s detective films. He also cohosted an episode of The Mike Douglas Show in 1980.

Raft was a stockholder in the Parvin-Dohrmann Corporation, a hotel and casino company that owned the Flamingo Las Vegas.

== Alleged criminal links and legal issues ==
When James Cagney became president of the Screen Actors Guild in 1942 for a two-year term, he took a role in the guild's fight against the Mafia, which had taken an active interest in the movie industry. Cagney's wife Billie once received a phone call telling her that Cagney was dead. Cagney alleged that, having failed to scare him, the mob sent a hitman to kill him by dropping a heavy light on his head. On hearing about the rumor of the hit, George Raft allegedly made a call to have the hit cancelled.

Raft was interviewed by FBI agents in 1938 and 1953. The 1938 interview was about his knowledge of Louis Buchalter and Jacob Shapiro.

Raft was investigated for alleged tax evasion in 1942.

In 1944, he gave evidence when Bugsy Siegel was on trial for bookmaking.

In 1946, Raft was sued by an attorney in Australia for assault.

In 1957, Mickey Cohen said that he wanted Raft to play him in any film about his life because "the others would portray me as a vicious gangster, but George would not."

In 1965, Raft was indicted on six counts of income-tax evasion involving $85.000 in income between 1958 and 1963. He pleaded guilty to one count of understating by $35,000 income he had received in 1961. Raft described it as a bookkeeping error and said that he did not intend to defraud the government. He was fined $2,500. The following year, he testified in front of a New York grand jury about organized-crime financial transactions.

In 1967, Raft was denied entry into the UK, where he had been installed as casino director at the Colony Club, because of his alleged underworld associations.

In his final years, Raft was beset by illness and legal problems, which included federal claims for unpaid taxes. He sold his canyon home overlooking Los Angeles and moved into an apartment.

== Personal life ==
Raft married Grace Mulrooney in 1923, long before his stardom, but they separated soon after. In 1934 legal papers, filed after Raft was linked publicly with Virginia Peine Lehmann Jr., a "department store heiress" and film actress, Mulrooney stated in legal papers that she wed Raft on June 16, 1923, when he was an "obscure hoofer." She stated that he had been paying her $50 a week under a separation agreement, and that he abandoned her in 1928.

The devoutly Catholic Mulrooney refused to grant a divorce, and Raft officially remained married to her and continued to support her until her death in 1970. A romantic figure in Hollywood, Raft had love affairs with Hilda Ferguson, Betty Grable, Marlene Dietrich, Tallulah Bankhead, Carole Lombard and Mae West. He stated publicly that he wanted to marry Norma Shearer, with whom he had a long romance, but his wife's refusal to allow a divorce eventually caused Shearer to end the affair.

== Death ==
Raft died from emphysema at the age of 79 in Los Angeles on November 24, 1980. Although some reports stated that Raft died of leukemia, his physician stated that he died of emphysema and was a "respiratory cripple for years."

Raft had no known relatives at the time of his death, and Los Angeles County sued to administer his estate if no claims were forthcoming. His estate consisted of only a $10,000 insurance policy and some furniture. In the last years of his life, he had lived on approximately $800 a month, a combination of Social Security and his Screen Actors Guild pension. His income was supplemented by occasional cameo appearances and roles in television commercials.

He was interred at the Forest Lawn – Hollywood Hills Cemetery in Los Angeles. Raft's personal effects and wardrobe were sold through a classified advertisement listing the lot for $800 in Hemmings Motor News in the fall of 1981.

== Legacy ==
Raft has two stars on the Hollywood Walk of Fame: for movies at 6150 Hollywood Boulevard and for television at 1500 Vine Street.

== In popular culture ==
Ray Danton played Raft in The George Raft Story (1961), which co-starred Jayne Mansfield. Raft excoriated the film upon its release due to inaccuracies. In the 1991 biographical movie Bugsy, the character of George Raft was played by Joe Mantegna.

In season 2, episode 6 of The Sopranos (2000), Corrado "Junior" Soprano reveals to Tony that there was another uncle, the "feeble-minded" Ercole, who Junior describes as "handsome, like George Raft".

In the Francis Ford Coppola film "The Cotton Club" (1984), the character of Dixie Dwyer appears to be loosely based on Raft: in the film, the character Owney Madden (Bob Hoskins) sends Dwyer (Richard Gere) to LA to appear in films - the first of which is titled "Mob Boss".

== Filmography ==
- Queen of the Night Clubs (1929) (with Texas Guinan) as Gigola
- Gold Diggers of Broadway (1929) as Dancer (uncredited)
- Side Street (1929) (with Tom, Owen and Matt Moore (Raft unbilled dancer) as Georgie Ames, the Dancer (uncredited)
- Quick Millions (1931) (with Spencer Tracy and Marguerite Churchill) as Jimmy Kirk
- Goldie (1931) (with Spencer Tracy and Jean Harlow) as Pickpocket (uncredited)
- Hush Money (1931) (with Joan Bennett and Myrna Loy) as Maxie
- Palmy Days (1931) (with Eddie Cantor) as Joe – Yolando's Henchman
- Taxi! (1932) (with James Cagney and Loretta Young) as William Kenny – Dance Contestant (uncredited)
- Dancers in the Dark (1932) (with Miriam Hopkins) as Louie Brooks
- Scarface (1932) (with Paul Muni and Ann Dvorak) as Guino Rinaldo (Raft flips the nickel in his breakthrough role)
- Night World (1932) (with Lew Ayres, Mae Clarke, and Boris Karloff) as Ed Powell
- Love Is a Racket (1932) as Sneaky (scenes deleted)
- Madame Racketeer (1932) (with Alison Skipworth and Richard Bennett) as Jack Houston
- Night After Night (1932) (with Mae West as a fictionalized Texas Guinan (Raft's 1st leading role) as Joe Anton
- If I Had a Million (1932; Raft plays a forger) as Eddie Jackson
- Under-Cover Man (1932) (with Nancy Carroll) as Nick Darrow
- Winner Take All (1932) (with James Cagney) as bandleader at Guinan's (archive footage) (uncredited)
- Pick-Up (1933) (with Sylvia Sidney) as Harry Glynn
- Midnight Club (1933) (with Clive Brook) (Raft 2nd billed) as Nick Mason
- The Bowery (1933) (with Wallace Beery, Fay Wray, and Pert Kelton) (Raft 2nd billed) as Steve Brodie
- All of Me (1934) (with Fredric March and Miriam Hopkins) (Raft 3rd billed) as Honey Rogers
- Bolero (1934) (with Carole Lombard and Ray Milland) (besides Scarface, Raft's signature film) as Raoul De Baere
- The Trumpet Blows (1934) (with Adolphe Menjou) as Manuel Montes
- Limehouse Blues (1934) (with Anna May Wong) as Harry Young
- Rumba (1935) (with Carole Lombard) as Joe Martin
- Stolen Harmony (1935) (with Lloyd Nolan and William Cagney) as Ray Angelo, alias Ray Ferraro
- The Glass Key (1935) (with Edward Arnold) as Ed Beaumont
- Every Night at Eight (1935) (with Alice Faye and Frances Langford) as 'Tops' Cardona
- She Couldn't Take It (1935) (with Joan Bennett) as Spot Ricardi / Joseph Ricard
- It Had to Happen (1936) (with Rosalind Russell) as Enrico Scaffa
- Yours for the Asking (1936) (with Dolores Costello and Ida Lupino) as Johnny Lamb
- Souls at Sea (1937) (with Gary Cooper) (Raft 2nd billed) as Powdah
- You and Me (1938) with Sylvia Sidney (with bizarre musical interludes by Kurt Weill) as Joe Dennis
- Spawn of the North (1938) (with Henry Fonda and John Barrymore) as Tyler Dawson
- The Lady's from Kentucky (1939) (with Ellen Drew) as Marty Black
- Each Dawn I Die (1939) with James Cagney (Raft 2nd billed) as 'Hood' Stacey
- I Stole a Million (1939) (with Claire Trevor) as Joe Lourik, alias Joe Harris
- Invisible Stripes (1939) (with William Holden and Humphrey Bogart) as Cliff Taylor
- The House Across the Bay (1940) (with Joan Bennett) as Steve
- They Drive by Night (1940) (with Ann Sheridan, Ida Lupino, and Humphrey Bogart) as Joe Fabrini
- Manpower (1941) (with Edward G. Robinson and Marlene Dietrich) (Raft 3rd billed, but played the lead) as Johnny Marshall
- Broadway (1942) (with Pat O'Brien and Broderick Crawford) (young B'way dancer) as himself
- Stage Door Canteen (1943) (with an all-star cast) as himself
- Background to Danger (1943) (with Sydney Greenstreet and Peter Lorre) as Joe Barton
- Follow the Boys (1944) (with Vera Zorina) as Tony West
- Nob Hill (1945) (with Joan Bennett and Vivian Blaine) as Tony Angelo
- Johnny Angel (1945) (with Claire Trevor and Hoagy Carmichael) as Johnny Angel
- Whistle Stop (1946) (with Ava Gardner and Victor McLaglen) as Kenny Veech
- Mr. Ace (1946) (with Sylvia Sidney) as Eddie Ace
- Nocturne (1946) (with Lynn Bari) as Joe Warne
- Intrigue (1947) (with June Havoc) as Brad Dunham
- Christmas Eve (1947) (with George Brent, Randolph Scott, and Joan Blondell) as Mario Torio
- Race Street (1948) (with William Bendix and Marilyn Maxwell) as Daniel J. 'Dan' Gannin
- Outpost in Morocco (1949) (with Marie Windsor and Akim Tamiroff) as Capt. Paul Gerard
- Johnny Allegro (1949) (with Nina Foch and Will Geer) as Johnny Allegro
- Red Light (1949) (with Virginia Mayo, Gene Lockhart, and Raymond Burr) as Johnny Torno
- A Dangerous Profession (1949) (with Ella Raines, Pat O'Brien, and Jim Backus) as Vince Kane
- We Shall Go to Paris (1950), (also known as Nous Irons a Paris) as himself
- I'll Get You for This (1951; AKA Lucky Nick Cain) (with Coleen Gray) as Nick Cain
- Loan Shark (1952) (with Dorothy Hart) as Joe Gargen
- Escape Route (1952; AKA I'll Get You) as Steve Rossi
- The Man from Cairo (1953) (Raft's last top billing in a theatrical film) as Mike Canelli
- I'm the Law (1954; 26-episode TV series) as Police Lt. George Kirby
- Rogue Cop (1954) (with Robert Taylor and Janet Leigh) (Raft 3rd billed) as Dan Beaumonte
- Black Widow (1954) (with Ginger Rogers, Van Heflin, and Gene Tierney) (Raft 4th billed) as Detective Lt. C.A. Bruce
- A Bullet for Joey (1955) (with Edward G. Robinson) (Raft 2nd billed) as Joe Victor aka Steiner
- Around the World in 80 Days (1956) (with David Niven and Marlene Dietrich) as Bouncer at the Barbary Coast Saloon
- Some Like It Hot (1959) (with Marilyn Monroe, Tony Curtis, and Jack Lemmon) (Raft 4th billed) as "Spats" Colombo, Chicago mobster
- Jet Over the Atlantic (1959) (with Guy Madison and Virginia Mayo) (Raft 3rd billed) as Stafford
- Ocean's 11 (1960) (with the Rat Pack) as Jack Strager, casino owner
- The Ladies Man (1961) (with Jerry Lewis) (Raft cameo)
- Two Guys Abroad (1962) as Nightclub co-owner
- For Those Who Think Young (1964) as Detective (uncredited)
- The Patsy (1964) as himself
- The Upper Hand (1966) (with Jean Gabin) (Raft 2nd billed) as Charles Binnaggio
- Casino Royale (1967) as himself
- Five Golden Dragons (1967) (with Robert Cummings and Klaus Kinski) as Dragon #2
- Skidoo (1968) (with Jackie Gleason and Groucho Marx) as Capt. Garbaldo
- Hammersmith Is Out (1972) (with Elizabeth Taylor, Richard Burton, and Peter Ustinov) as Guido Scartucci
- Deadhead Miles (1972) as himself
- Sextette (1978) (with Mae West, her final movie, and Timothy Dalton) as himself
- The Man with Bogart's Face (1980) as Petey Cane (final film role)

=== Short subjects ===
- Hollywood on Parade No. A-9 (1933)
- Hollywood on Parade No. B-5 (1933)
- Hollywood on Parade No. B-8 (1934)
- The Fashion Side of Hollywood (1935)
- Screen Snapshots Series 18, No. 4 (1938)
- Meet the Stars #6: Stars at Play (1941)
- Hedda Hopper's Hollywood No. 2 (1941)
- Hollywood Park (1946)
- Screen Snapshots: Vacation at Del Mar (1949)

=== Roles rejected ===
Raft turned down roles in the following films:

- The Story of Temple Drake (1933) – replaced by Jack La Rue
- Belle of the Nineties (1934) – replaced by Roger Pryor
- The Princess Comes Across (1935) – replaced by Fred MacMurray
- Dead End (1937) – replaced by Humphrey Bogart
- Stolen Heaven (1938) – replaced by Gene Raymond
- The Magnificent Fraud (1939) – replaced by Lloyd Nolan
- St. Louis Blues (1939) – replaced by Lloyd Nolan
- South of Suez (1940) – replaced by George Brent
- City for Conquest (1940) – replaced by Anthony Quinn
- It All Came True (1940) – replaced by Humphrey Bogart
- Blues in the Night (1941) – replaced by Richard Whorf
- The Sea Wolf (1941) – replaced by John Garfield
- High Sierra (1941) – replaced by Humphrey Bogart
- The Wagons Roll at Night (1941) – replaced by Humphrey Bogart
- Out of the Fog (1941) – replaced by John Garfield
- The Maltese Falcon (1941) – replaced by Humphrey Bogart
- All Through the Night (1942) – replaced by Humphrey Bogart
- The Big Shot (1942) – replaced by Humphrey Bogart
- Juke Girl (1942) – replaced by Ronald Reagan
- Double Indemnity (1944) – replaced by Fred MacMurray
- The Big Heat (1953) – replaced by Alexander Scourby
- Morning Call (1957) – replaced by Ron Randell

== Select radio appearances ==
- Kraft Cheese Program (1936)
- Lux Radio Theatre – "Cheating Cheaters" (31 August 1936) – with June Lang
- Lux Radio Theatre – "Spawn of the North" (12 September 1938) – with Dorothy Lamour and Fred MacMurray
- Bob Hope – "Bob Hope is Remodeling His House" (1939)
- Screen Guild Theatre: "A Mug, a Moll and a Mountaineer" (2 April 1939)
- Procter and Gamble's Knickerbocker Playhouse – "Bulldog Drummond" (1939)
- Campbell Soup Playhouse – "A Free Soul" (1941)
- Lux Radio Theatre – "They Drive By Night" (2 June 1941) – with Lana Turner
- Screen Guild Theatre – "Torrid Zone" (25 January 1942)
- Lux Radio Theatre – "Manpower" (16 March 1942) – with Marlene Dietrich and Edward G. Robinson
- Lux Radio Theatre – "Broadway" (30 November 1942) – with Lloyd Nolan
- Lux Radio Theatre – "Each Dawn I Die" (22 March 1943) – with Franchot Tone
- Lux Radio Theatre – Air Force (7 December 1943)
- Lux Radio Theatre – "Action in the North Atlantic" (15 May 1944) – with Raymond Massey
- The Cases of Mr. Ace (4 June – 3 September 1947) – regular series
- Lux Radio Theatre – "Intrigue" (5 October 1948)
- Rocky Jordan (27 June – 22 August 1951)
- Martin and Lewis Show (12 October 1951)

== Sources ==
- 1900 United States Federal Census, Census Place: Manhattan, New York, New York; Roll T623_1109; Page: 4B; Enumeration District: 642.
- 1910; Census Place: Manhattan Ward 12, New York, New York; Roll T624_1025; p. 19A; Enumeration District: 668; Image: 1104
