= Too Many Husbands =

Too Many Husbands may refer to:

- Too Many Husbands (1914 film), American silent film made by Vitagraph studios; based on the play by Wills
- Too Many Husbands (1918 film), directed by Charles Avery
- Too Many Husbands (1938 film), British comedy film directed by Ivar Campbell
- Too Many Husbands (1940 film), American romantic comedy film
- Too Many Husbands, another title for W. Somerset Maugham's 1919 play Home and Beauty
- Too Many Husbands, a 1911 play by Anthony E. Wills
- "Too Many Husbands", a 2020 single by the band Coriky
- "Too Many Husbands", episode 19 of the 1953-1954 radio drama Rocky Fortune

== See also ==
- Polyandry
