= Rowland Brown =

American screenwriter (1900–1963)

Rowland Brown (November 6, 1900 – May 6, 1963), born Chauncey Rowland Brown in Canton, Ohio, was an American screenwriter and film director, whose career as a director ended in the early 1930s after he started many more films than he finished. He walked out of State's Attorney (1932), starring John Barrymore. He was abruptly replaced as director of The Scarlet Pimpernel.

As a writer, he was credited with twenty or so films including two Academy Award nominations, one in the 11th Academy Awards for Best Original Story Angels with Dirty Faces and another in the 4th Academy Awards for Doorway to Hell.

== Early life ==
Chauncey Rowland Brown was the first child of Hannah and Samuel Gilson Brown, native Ohioans. In 1900, the year Rowland was born, his father was a thirty-year-old electrician in Canton, Ohio. Twelve and a half years later he had become a successful realtor in the same town. Then, on April 4, 1913, the family was packed and ready to leave for Panama, when Samuel Gilson Brown had a massive heart attack. He was rushed to an Akron hospital, where he died.. Samuel Brown's unexpected death left his widow, Hannah Rowland Brown, to raise their four children, Chauncey, Samuel Gilson, Marguerite, and Jean) alone. By default, twelve-year-old Chauncey had become the "man of the family."

In 1915, Hannah married Walter J. Maytham, a successful engineer, who brought along his own five children. Two years later, on April 6, 1917, when the U.S. declared war on Germany, forty-year-old Walter Maytham and sixteen-year-old Rowland Brown rushed to enlist. Both were turned down, Maytham because of a "deformed toe" and Brown because he was too young. November 9, 1917, three days after Chauncey turned sixteen, Hannah gave birth to her third son, John Rowland Maytham.

=== Military service ===
Because of his earlier rejection by the United States Navy, on his second try Rowland Brown lied about his age. The fictitious year of birth, 1897, appears on his subsequent registration in the Navy Auxiliary Reserve and is widely given in books and web sources. For all of his desire to participate in the war, The Official Roster of Ohio Soldiers in World War I, page 240, shows that Brown wasn't called to active duty until November 4, 1918. He had just one week of active duty, which he served at Great Lakes Naval Training Station on the shore of Lake Michigan — just in time to hear the guns of the War to End all Wars" fall silent. The roster shows that he served as a seaman second class for an additional 135 days, before being released on April 27, 1919. He received an honorable discharge on September 30, 1921, the cause being a "lack of funds."

=== Education ===
Brown attended University School in Cleveland, Ohio. According to Film historian, John C. Tibbetts, Brown attended the University of Detroit and Detroit School of Fine Arts. The occasional references to his having attending Harvard, perhaps confused him with his eldest son, Rowland C. W. Brown who earned two Harvard degrees.)

== Marriage and children ==
Rowland Brown was married three times: in 1921 to Rhea Widrig; in 1940 to Marie Helis; in 1946 to actress, Karen Van Ryn (Karen Thiele). He had five children: Rowland C.W. Brown, 1923; Megan Brown, 1927-2023 Steven Brown, 1942–2010; Daphne Browne; and Craig Brown, all of whom survived him.

== Reputation ==
Chauncey Rowland Brown's reputation preceded him and led to many rumors. It was said he knew a little too much about gangsters; that he must have been a communist because he thought capitalism was flawed; that he was hot headed and irresponsible; that he had been a professional boxer; that he was a heavy drinker.

=== Underworld ties ===
The most pervasive rumors concerned Brown's ties to well known gangsters. Legend has it that he survived as a bootlegger during Prohibition in the United States. Another rumor was that before he came to Hollywood, he had been a bodyguard for a Detroit gangster. He apparently knew Benjamin Bugsy Siegel, but not well. The 1967 paperback We Only Kill Each Other: The life and bad times of Bugsy Siegel includes an anecdote in which Brown and Siegel meet at Santa Anita and threaten to commit various degrees of mayhem on each other.

Brown, described as a thin and wiry man, responds to Siegel's threat by saying,"I'm just as tough as you are, and I know your pals Frank Costello and Frank Nitti and I've got a mind to call 'em and report what you said." Siegel' or his biographer's description of Brown differs from his friend, Gene Fowler's, who described Brown as "hulking." Philip Dunne described him as a "big bear of a man." Nothing in Dean's anecdote suggests a friendship. The situation described in Jennings's book called for a bluff. Gangster rumors enhanced Brown's writing and consulting career, lending "authenticity" to his films.

=== Red rumors ===
In the early 1930s, the country had seen what many believed to be the failure of capitalism. Banks were failing; the high unemployment rate resulted in bread lines and the dust bowl resulted in a great westward migration of homeless and desperate farm families, as a consequence, many Americans, whether intellectuals, artists or factory workers had their eyes on the Soviet Union, thinking it was possible that an economy based on something other than "free enterprise" might lead to a more stable society. Many American writers and artists joined the Communist Party.

In his 1956 paperback, The Left Side of the Screen, Bob Herzberg described Rowland Brown as "an angry and short-tempered Communist" who "punched out a Fox producer in the early 1930s." Brown was neither a member of the Communist Party, nor a fellow traveler," but because of the implied critique of capitalism some found in his gangster movies, he was suspected. Brown, himself, furthered that reputation by announcing that he had sent a congratulatory telegram to the U.S.S.R. on the anniversary of the Russian Revolution.

Furthermore, Brown and his brother, Gilson Brown, had accepted a Soviet invitation to make a film in Russia. They got as far as New York before changing their minds and turning back. Neither of the brothers was included on the Hollywood blacklist during the McCarthy Era. Even though Samuel Ornitz, who had worked with Brown on Hell's Highway, was one of The Hollywood Ten, Brown was never called to testify before the House Un-American Activities Committee.

=== Sparred Jack Dempsey ===
Rowland Brown himself claimed to have knocked Jack Dempsey down, and it is true that he once sparred with Dempsey, though it is unclear whether he actually knocked him down. Gene Fowler, who was Dempsey's longtime friend, recalls a conversation with the former champion. Dempsey said that Brown "hung a right hand on my whiskers and I felt sort of groggy and futile ... He gave me plenty and he took plenty. ..." In the same article, Fowler consoles Dempsey by saying Brown had to be hospitalized after the fight.

=== Punched producer? ===
Brown did in fact punch a producer, knocking him down, but no one can say which producer it was. Some writers say it was David O. Selznick, who fired him in anger over script changes for A Star is Born (an adaptation of What Price Hollywood). In Sixty Years of Hollywood, John Baxter asserts the victim was the producer of The Devil is a Sissy, Frank Davis, and that this resulted in Brown's being replaced as director of the film. There is no question about Brown's having punched a producer; the question is whether the punch was career-ending.

=== Use of alcohol ===
This was a popular rumor and would seem to be a reasonable assumption as Brown's behavior became increasingly erratic. However, Philip Dunne's is the only mention by one of his contemporaries of Brown's drinking. Fowler, quoting a mutual acquaintance, wrote "the novelist made affidavit "[Brown] doesn't drink or smoke had on the entire industry.

In her 1936 article, "Joining Sight and Sound," The New York Times film critic, Janet Graves discussed the problems that surfaced during the first few years that lead to their becoming "deadly 100 percent Talkies." She asserted film had become "hypnotized by the sound of its own voice." She said that words should neither reduce the camera work nor refute what the camera says. Graves praised Rowland Brown as one of the few writers or directors to go against the tide of words.

She credits Brown with "the first appearance of a style that remains unique in the development of motion picture dialogue "both in Doorway to Hell and Quick Millions." Graves illustrates Brown's style with the final scene from Quick Millions, in which the gang leader, Spencer Tracy says, "take your elbow out of my ribs," and the lieutenant says, "That's not my elbow." An unseen hand pulls down a shade and the audience hears two shots. End of movie! In comparison, Graves points to Franchot Tone's "pretty speech" at the end of Mutiny on the Bounty suggesting the words get lost against the dramatic background.

Broader issues, both political and moral, troubled the developing movie industry. With the stock market crash in 1929, and general economic turbulence, many writers who had begun to question both the survival and moral basis of capitalism; others felt Marxism was the greater threat to a democratic society. Racial and religious discrimination had been institutionalized. Prohibition had empowered gangsters and made drinking chic.

Reformists saw the silver screen as the perfect vehicle for presenting social issues. Others saw it as a canvas on which to display "ARS GRATIA ARTIS”—Art for art's sake—the motto of MGM. Others outside of the industry itself saw film as an entirely corrupting influence on society, in need of regulation. Young Rowland Brown, arriving from the Midwest with a handful of one-act plays, just hoped to address those issues, all of them, with the tools he had at hand. He soon discovered the many impediments to doing so.

=== Pre-code ===
Rowland Brown is now remembered in lists of favorites and program notes for being "largely forgotten." In the article on Blood Money in Cult Movies 2, Danny Peary lists a handful of mediocre films Brown worked on after his pre-code successes, then notes that "the rest of Brown's career was completely undistinguished."

==== Prop boy to director ====
Brown's career in films began around 1925 as a laborer on the Universal. By 1926 he had inched his way into the studio as a gagman for Reginald Denny. In 1927, he got his first break as a writer, when Universal bought a one-act play from him that was never produced, but led to his first screen credits for work on “Points West,” a 1929 cowboy movie starring Hoot Gibson. During the thirty years that followed, Brown received credit for either the original story or the screen adaptation of a scant twenty films, including the four films that he both wrote and directed.

In 1930, the box office success of The Doorway to Hell, based on his play, A Handful of Clouds, earned Brown the chance to direct his story, Quick Millions, for Fox and Blood Money for Twentieth Century.

1931 Quick Millions: Quick Millions was an artistic success, but failed at the box office. Produced before the Production Code was fully effective, its sympathetic treatment of ... offended a public that denied its kinship. Bruce Bennet wrote: 'Though praised at the time for its frank depiction of crooks and politicians at work with and against each other, Quick Millions has a subtle and expedient visual style decades ahead of its time.' It was his unusual rise from prop boy to director that first caught the interest of the press. While Brown was working on Quick Millions, the first of the films he was to direct, a New York Times reporter asked him about his rise from laborer to director. Brown replied: "Just the breaks. Until I wrote Doorway to Hell they wouldn't let me in a studio. I'd written stories that I believe were much better. I'm not going to sell them now unless I have to. I'm going to keep them to direct myself. he had decided not to sell the others unless he could direct them himself."

In 1932, Brown joined Gene Fowler to work on the script for Adela Rogers St. Johns' story for What Price Hollywood (discussed above). In 1933 he wrote Blood Money, the favorite of pre-code film, certain film buffs and at least one great modern director, was vilified by Brown's contemporaries.Martin Scorsese said it this way: Rowland Brown, "a largely forgotten figure, made three tough, sardonic movies in the early '30s, each one very knowledgeable about city politics, corruption, the coziness between cops and criminals. Blood Money is my favorite. The ending is unforgettable".

At the time of its opening in New York, Mordaunt Hall called Blood Money "flat stuff, even of its sort." He wrote "This whimsical little tale of thievery, thuggery and attempted slaughter was mistaken for entertainment by Darryl Zanuck." A program note from a 2012 film series at Northwestern University's Block Museum of Art puts a rather different light on the same film: Blood Money is a deliciously perverse tale of double-crosses and dark desires. This still shockingly subversive film garnered the dubious honor of being first on the list of banned films from the Catholic Church's Legion of Decency."

A program note from a recent film series at ], describes his work as being a "strong critique of capitalism." The commentator goes on to say that Brown's films "obliterate the distinction between crime and the law." The writer quotes Spencer Tracy's character in Quick Millions who says "That's "the dream of every racketeer, to have a legitimate racket."

1932 Hell's Highway was released a short time before the better known film on the same subject, I Am a Fugitive from a Chain Gang. Both depict the brutality of prisons in a way that led to eventual prison reforms. In Prison Pictures from Hollywood James Robert Parish quotes the trade paper, Variety, as warning exhibitors "It is not entertainment, and to be questioned whether a sufficient number of persons will feel interest in the convict, despite the famous 'sweat box' trial of recent date, on which the story appears to have been found." A number of Brown's original scenes were cut by the studio and the final scene modified in an attempt to make the movie more acceptable to an audience. In spite of those alterations, film historian, Saverio Giovacchi found it "an impressive example of both democratic modernism and the 1930s American radical tradition."

=== Direction to "largely forgotten" ===
The most consequential walk-off of his career was the one that left him unemployed and stranded in England. The legendary Hungarian director, Alexander Korda, was attempting to make British films distinguishable from American films, and in 1934 he invited the image-oriented Brown to direct The Scarlet Pimpernel. The invitation was a huge opportunity for the young director. Not long after the filming had begun, Korda arrived on the set to observe Brown at work. He told Brown that he was directing the classic like a gangster film. Raymond Massey, who witnessed the scene, wrote "Brown announced he would direct the way he liked or walk out. Alex said very sweetly, 'Please walk.'" Korda, himself, an enormously successful director was known for his outbursts and the ill treatment of subordinates, Brown was known for walkouts related to autonomy.

Brown disliked both being a director, and being directed. In 1932, David Selznick promised Brown the direction of What Price Hollywood, After Brown rewrote the script, Selznick replaced him with George Cukor. In 1937, Selznick hired Brown to direct the next incarnation of the script, altered and renamed A Star is Born. This time, Brown refused to rewrite the script, saying that it required no changing, Selznick replaced him with William Wellman. Selznick, himself, claimed credit for the original story. (None of the original writers of What Price Hollywood received credit. A recent commentator quoted on IMDb called it "one of the best behind-the-scenes looks at old Hollywood studio system that was ever made," a sentiment frequently voiced.

Gene Fowler recognized Brown's difficulties as simply a need for compromise. Producers could not afford to indulge the vision of either a director or a writer beyond a certain point. In 1932, when Gene Fowler met him, Brown already had a reputation as a stormy petrel Peckinpau. Fowler saw Brown in a different light, he said Brown was "a severe honesty in this man's viewpoint," with a remarkable understanding of "realistic art;" . . . . "More than that there was a great compassion." But Fowler added, "Hollywood generals have no time, presumably, to utilize the deep-rooted genius of a Rowland Brown." Fowler continued to believe in Brown's worth, even after the walk off later in the year from State's Attorney, that could have ended his career. It took courage to walk out on the great John Barrymore, particularly since Brown and Fowler had co-written the script. When the producer refused his request for the cameraman he wanted. To the public it seemed petulant. To Brown, having the right cameraman was central, because his use of image was both unique and essential to the development of both his characters and their milieu.

==== Reason for walk-outs ====
In 1932, when Philip K. Scheuer, the long-time Los Angeles Times film critic, asked both Harry d'Arrast and Rowland Brown, independently, why they had walked out on so many films, each answered he had done so for the sake of artistic integrity. Brown detailed his reasons, saying he hadn't made Yellow Ticket, because he had been ashamed to ask Lionel Barrymore to play the lead, that he handed back the script for Raffles because Samuel Goldwyn wouldn't let him update it and had told Brown that he'd been hired to direct, not to write. Brown said the only reason he did "the Hollywood thing" (What Price Hollywood) was because he had been promised he would direct it.

== Early recognition ==
Very early on, Mordaunt Hall, The New York Times first film critic, wrote "so good is the talking film The Doorway to Hell, that "one's only regret is that all the talent was put into nothing more than a gangster story." Hall goes on to say that "for a thug and racketeering yarn" it is "decidedly shrewdly done, with pat dialogue and quick action." This is the style that characterizes Brown's work – for better or worse.

== Death ==
Rowland Brown died of natural causes. His career preceded him in death. There were many plausible explanations for his seemingly having vanished from Hollywood. So many other things were going on during that period of Brown's life, that it seems doubtful that he was focused on film making at all. In 1939, not long before his brother Jack's death in 1940, Brown had married Marie Helis, his second wife. Marie was the daughter of Greek-born William G. Helis, Sr., described in the Pittsburgh Post-Gazette as having a "fortune of staggering proportions." He had also acquired a stable of thoroughbreds. Brown, a frequenter of racetracks, wrote The Lady's from Kentucky in 1939. That was the same year that Brown received his second Academy Award nomination, this one for the best original story, Angels with Dirty Faces.

=== Brown presentations ===
December 21, 1941, exactly two weeks after Pearl Harbor, a small announcement appeared in the New York Times mentioning that the newly formed "Brown Presentations, . . . guided by Marie A. and Rowland Brown," had "signified its intention to enter the theatrical field." Brown and his wife were leaving Hollywood. On March 16, 1942, Johnny 2X4, a three-act melodrama about a 1926 speakeasy, opened at the Longacre on Broadway. Rowland Brown both wrote and produced Johnny 2X4. The play was quite an ambitious undertaking. Brown Presentations had spared no expense. Eugene Burr, the reviewer from Billboard, wrote that the cast was so large that the curtain calls "looked like rush hour at Walgreens."

Brooks Atkinson's review was a death sentence. He also commented on the extravagance of the production. While acknowledging his enjoyment of the music in the first act, Atkinson said that he found it either "incredible or discouraging to realize that Mr. Brown has gone to so much trouble and expense without having an original idea to contribute." A decade had passed since Mordaunt Hall wrote, "So good is the talking film, The Doorway to Hell, that one's only regret is that all the talent was put into nothing more than a gangster story." [8]

Atkinson pretty much agreed with Hall about the entertainment value of gangsters and found little in Johnny 2X4 to recommend. He said that the gangsters and illegal booze of the mid-Twenties were no longer of interest. His artistry was lost on Broadway. The small details that spoke volumes in film were not noticeable on the crowded stage. The crafted bits of conversation didn't add up to a plot, and whatever it was that Brown was attempting to say was lost—as was the audience.

The 1926 speakeasy that was "as flat as stale beer" for Burr "had everything" for at least one member of the cast. Hall remarked that the people on stage seemed to be having a wonderful time, while the audience couldn't understand why. In her book Lauren Bacall By Myself, Bacall confirmed the experience on stage. She wrote, "The show was full of music, laughter, melodrama — the smoke of a speakeasy — The Yacht Club Boys singing songs on stage and moving through the audience — love—shooting. It had everything!" Bacall remembered eagerly reading of the reviews. Even knowing the party would soon be over barely dimmed her joy in actually being a professional actress. Disappointment was part of the profession.

Johnny2x4 survived for eight weeks on Broadway, then eked out another three on the Subway Circuit before fading into oblivion. Still Brown Presentations had produced remarkable changes in several lives. For Betty Bacall, her walk-on was the first professional step of her long career. Karen Van Ryn's small role led to nearly twenty years of marriage to Rowland Brown. Marie lost her investment in Brown Presentations.

Brown's return to Hollywood netted very little work, in part because of declining health. He had suffered from the effects of uncontrolled high blood pressure for much of his life. It was taking its toll. During the next decade, he sold two stories, "Nocturne." and "Kansas City Confidential." He also wrote a play for television, "Jacob and the Angel."

He died at the age of sixty-three. The Los Angeles Times reported the cause of death as a heart attack, but several family members said was a stroke. His obvious decline during the last decade of his life might even have been the result of head injuries incurred during his brief career as a boxer. When Rowland Brown died he was working on a biography of his old friend, Gene Fowler, who once said of Brown's fall from grace:

They have mistaken his unbridled vitality for insubordination; his native talent for pig iron; his abuse of beauty and pictorial authenticity for rebellious babble, and his refusal to sit in a rut like a melancholy and brooding Buddha, contemplating his umbilicus, as a downright menace.

== Filmography ==
=== As writer-director ===
- 1931 Quick Millions : Fox; wrote screenplay with Courtenay Terrett
- 1932 Hell's Highway : RKO wrote screenplay with Samuel Ornitz
- 1933 Blood Money : Twentieth Century – United Artists; wrote screenplay with Hal Long
- 1936 The Devil is a Sissy : MGM wrote original story

== As a writer ==
- 1929 Fugitives
- 1929 Points West, Universal-Jewel Screenplay
- 1930 The Doorway to Hell, Warner Brothers; Play Author (A Handful of Clouds)
- 1931 Quick Millions
- 1931 State's Attorney
- 1931 Hell's Highway
- 1932 What Price Hollywood?, with Gene Fowler, Jane Murfin, and Adela Rogers St. Johns
- 1933 Blood Money
- 1934 What Happened to Harkness?
- 1934 Leave It to Blanche, Warner Brothers; original story
- 1935 Widow's Might, Warner Brothers; screenplay by Rowland Brown and Brock Williams
- 1936 The Devil is a Sissy
- 1937 Boy of the Streets
- 1938 Angels with Dirty Faces, Warner Bros.
- 1939 The Lady's from Kentucky; Paramount; original story
- 1940 Johnny Apollo; 20th century Fox; screenplay by Rowland Brown and Philip Dunne
- 1946 Nocturne; RKO; original story by Rowland Brown and Frank Fenton
- 1950 The Nevadan; Columbia; additional dialogue
- 1952 Kansas City Confidential; United Artists; original story by Rowland Brown and Harold R. Greene
