= Etienne Girardot =

English actor (1856–1939)

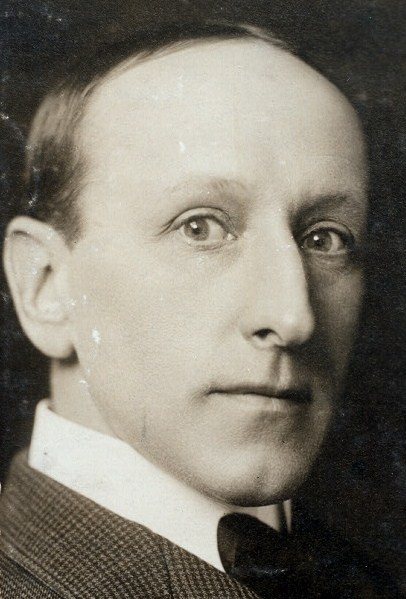
- ca. 1905
- Born: 22 February 1856; London, England
- Died: 10 November 1939 (aged 83); Hollywood, California, U.S.
- Resting place: Hollywood Forever Cemetery
- Occupation: Actor
- Years active: 1870s-1939
- Spouse: Dr. Violetta Shelton

Etienne Girardot (English: /ʒiːˈrɑːrdoʊ/ zhee-RAR-doh, French: [etjɛn ʒiʁaʁdo]; 22 February 1856 – 10 November 1939) was a diminutive stage and film actor of Anglo-French parentage born in London, England.

== Biography ==
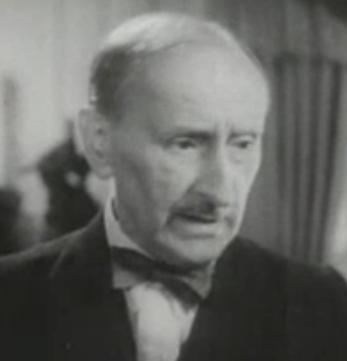
Giardot in The Kennel Murder Case, 1933

The son of French painter Ernest Gustave Girardot, he studied at an art school, but left at age seventeen to go on stage. Having played in the provinces, he made his debut on the London stage at the Haymarket Theatre. He went to America in 1893, where he continued his career. He was a success, with numerous Broadway shows to his credit, including the 1893 production of Charley's Aunt, in which he played Lord Fancourt Babberley for three years.

He also worked in film, both silents and talkies, debuting in 1911 in Intrepid Davy. Among his film roles were the harmless lunatic who fancies himself a millionaire in the 1934 screwball comedy Twentieth Century, with John Barrymore and Carole Lombard, and the harassed coroner in three murder mysteries starring William Powell as detective Philo Vance.

Girardot died after a short stay in the hospital. He was survived by his wife Dr. Violetta Shelton, an "eye, ear, nose and throat specialist."

== Complete filmography ==
- Intrepid Davy (1911 short)
- Her Hero (1911 short)
- An Innocent Burglar (1911 short) as The Real Burglar
- A Slight Mistake (1911 short)
- One Touch of Nature (1911 short) as Mr. Grochberg - the Jewish Father, the Rabbi
- Nicholas Nickleby (1912 short) as Gryde
- Beau Brummel (1913 short) as Isadore - Brummel's Valet
- Betty in the Lions' Den (1913 short)
- Up in a Balloon (1913 short) as The Minister
- Goodness Gracious (1913 short)
- Bunny's Birthday (1914 short) as Neighbor Smith
- A Good Little Devil (1914) as Old Nick Jr.
- The Hall-Room Rivals (1914 short) as 2nd Sea Captain
- Cherry (1914 short)
- Too Many Husbands (1914 short) as Chauncey Chilton
- The Violin of Monsieur (1914 short) as Pere Gerome
- Pigs Is Pigs (1914 short)
- Bread Upon the Waters (1914 short) as Jean
- David Garrick (1914 short)
- The New Stenographer (1914 short) as Mr. Brown
- The Barrel Organ (1914 short) as Bunions - the Organ Grinder
- Underneath the Paint (1914 short) as William Marsh
- The Treason of Anatole (1915 short) as Anatole
- Mary's Duke (1915 short) as Duke d'Enfetti
- Uncle John (1915 short) as Uncle John Waldron - the Landlord
- The Broken Toy (1915 short) as Sylvain - the Dancing Instructor
- The Blank Page (1915 short) as The Scientist
- The Toy-Maker of Leyden (1915 short) as Martha's Father - the Toy-Maker
- Circus Mary (1915 short)
- Artie, the Millionaire Kid (1916) as The widow
- The Belle of New York (1919)
- The Witness for the Defense (1919) as Richard Pettifer
- A Stage Romance (1922) as Salomon
- Storm at Daybreak (1933) as Hungarian Officer (uncredited)
- The Kennel Murder Case (1933) as Dr. Doremus
- Blood Money (1933) as Bail Bond Clerk
- Mandalay (1934) as Mr. Abernathie
- Fashions of 1934 (1934) as Glass
- Twentieth Century (1934) as Mathew J. Clark
- Born to Be Bad (1934) as J. K. Brown - Claim Adjustor (uncredited)
- Little Man, What Now? (1934) as Spannfuss
- Return of the Terror (1934) as Mr. Tuttle
- The Dragon Murder Case (1934) as Dr. Doremus
- The Firebird (1934) as Prof. Peterson
- Clive of India (1935) as Mr. Warburton
- Grand Old Girl (1935) as Mellis
- The Whole Town's Talking (1935) as Seaver
- Chasing Yesterday (1935) as M. Mouche
- Hooray for Love (1935) as Judge Peterby
- Curly Top (1935) as Mr. Wyckoff
- The Bishop Misbehaves (1935) as Brooke
- I Live My Life (1935) as Professor
- Metropolitan (1935) as Nello
- In Old Kentucky (1935) as Pluvius J. Aspinwall, the Rainmaker
- The Garden Murder Case (1936) as Dr. Doremus
- The Music Goes 'Round (1936) as Brewster
- Half Angel (1936) as Dr. Alexander Cotton
- Hearts Divided (1936) as Du Fresne
- The Devil Is a Sissy (1936) as Principal
- The Longest Night (1936) as Kendrick Kinney
- Go West, Young Man (1936) as Prof. Herbert Rigby
- College Holiday (1936) as Prof. Hercules Dove
- The Road Back (1937) as Mayor
- Wake Up and Live (1937) as Waldo Peebles
- Danger – Love at Work (1937) as Albert Pemberton
- Breakfast for Two (1937) as Mr. Meggs
- The Great Garrick (1937) as Jean Cabot
- Professor Beware (1938) as Judge Henry Pitts (uncredited)
- Port of Seven Seas (1938) as Bruneau
- Having Wonderful Time (1938) as Mr. G (scenes deleted)
- There Goes My Heart (1938) as Hinkley - Secretary
- The Arizona Wildcat (1939) as Judge White
- Fast and Loose (1939) as Christopher Oates
- The Story of Vernon and Irene Castle (1939) as Papa Aubel
- For Love or Money (1939) as Poindexte
- Exile Express (1939) as Caretaker
- Hawaiian Nights (1939) as Alonzo Dilman
- Little Accident (1939) as Professor Artemus Glenwater
- The Hunchback of Notre Dame (1939) as Doctor (posthumously)
- Isle of Destiny (1940) as "Doc" Spriggs (posthumously)
