= The Wheels of Justice =

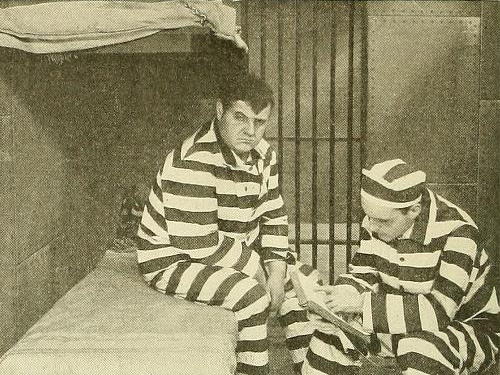
- Ralph Brooks (James Morrison) on the bunk in his cell with his cellmate Tug Riley (Anders Randolph)
- Directed by: Theodore Marston
- Written by: Edward J. Montagne
- Starring: Dorothy Kelly; James Morrison; Louise Beaudet
- Cinematography: Reginald Edgar Lyons
- Production company: Vitagraph
- Distributed by: V-L-S-E, Inc.
- Release date: February 14, 1915 (US)
- Running time: 4 reels
- Country: United States
- Language: Silent (English intertitles)

The Wheels of Justice is a 1915 American silent drama film written by Edward J. Montagne, directed by Theodore Marston, and starring Dorothy Kelly, James Morrison, and Louise Beaudet. It premiered in February 1915, before its wide release in August of the same year. It was met with mostly positive reviews.

== Plot ==
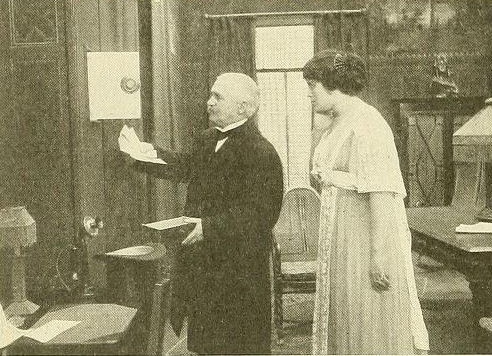
Rita Reynolds (Eulalie Jensen) watching her husband John (Charles Eldridge) put valuables in the safe

Ralph Brooks is dating Julia Dean. When the two attend a reception, he meets Rita Reynolds, the wife of John Reynolds, a wealthy broker. He becomes entranced with her and falls for her false story of spousal abuse. He agrees to take her away from her situation and elope. However, the reality is that Rita is simply using both her husband and Ralph. Her husband is nothing more than a cash machine to finance her exorbitant lifestyle, while Ralph is the perfect patsy to help her further her selfish goals. She has selected a night on which her husband is scheduled to be out for her and Ralph to escape. She also maneuvers the household staff to be out as well. This is so she can rob her husband's safe prior to leaving. However, as she is emptying the safe a thief, Red Hall, actually arrives and interrupts her. As the two confront one another, her husband unexpectedly returns home. Seeing that he is being robbed, he confronts his wife and thief, brandishing a gun. The husband and wife struggle, during which the gun goes off, killing the husband. She decides to blame Red for the murder, and holds him at gunpoint. When Ralph arrives, he listens to the recap of what happened, and is so revolted by Rita's true nature, he balks at going through with her plan. When she sees that she has alienated Ralph, she changes her plan, and orders the thief to escape, turning the gun on Ralph.

When the police arrive, Rita blames the murder on Ralph, and on the strength of her testimony, he is convicted and sent to prison for twenty years. While in prison, he manages to reform his cellmate, Tug Riley, and eventually the two manage to escape from prison, at the same time as another group of criminals. During the ensuing chase, Tug and Ralph escape and return to the city, while the other group of criminals is chased, and drives their car off a drawbridge as they attempt to flee, drowning them all.

Meanwhile, Red has been blackmailing Rita, threatening to go to the police with the truth of her husband's murder. As his demands increase, he concocts a plan for her to hold a fancy costume reception, at which he will rob all her guests. When Tug and Ralph get back to the city, Red recruits Tug to help him rob the guests during the party. However, now reformed by Ralph, he goes to him and reveals Red's plan. Ralph comes up with his own plan and informs the police of the impending crime, and goes to the reception masquerading as the dead John Reynolds. The police arrive in time to catch Red red-handed with stolen jewels on him. Rita is confronted by the specter of her dead husband, causing her to confess her guilt in his murder, thus exonerating Ralph, who is returned to his mother and Julia.

== Cast list ==
- Dorothy Kelly as Julia Dean
- James Morrison as Ralph Brooks
- Louise Beaudet as Mrs. Brooks
- Eulalie Jensen as Rita Reynolds
- Charles Eldridge as John Reynolds
- Anders Randolph as Tug Riley
- George Cooper as Red Hall

== Production ==
The film had its world premiere on February 14, 1915, at the Vitagraph Theater in New York City, where it ran for a week. It was revealed that the cast included Dorothy Kelly, James Morrison, Louise Beaudet, .Xnders Randolf, Eulalie Jensen, George Cooper, and Charles Eldridge. The movie was announced as being added to Vitagraph's schedule shortly before its general release in August 1915. At the same time it was revealed that the films stars were Dorothy Kelly and James Morrison, who would be making their debut for Vitagraph.

== Reception ==
Moving Picture World gave the picture a good review. While they felt it was melodramatic, they said that the plot was very strong, which got stronger as the film progressed, and was full of thrilling moments. They particularly enjoyed the scenes of the escape from prison and the ensuing chase. The magazine pointedly highlighted the work of Eulalie Jensen, who they credited with lifting "the production above the commonplace and the conventional". Motography also gave the film a positive review, saying it was full "of action and strong drama". They felt the picture was realistic, and especially enjoyed the courtroom, prison, and escape sequences. They praised the performances of Dorothy Kelly and Eulalie Jenson. Motion Picture News also enjoyed the film saying it was very well-paced and full of many "novel scenes". They particularly enjoyed the realism of the prison scenes. Variety, on the hand, gave the film a poor review, feeling the plot was doleful and inconsistent. They particularly did not like the performance of James Morrison, who they felt took on a role which was beyond his capabilities.
