= Slaves of Pride =

1920 silent film

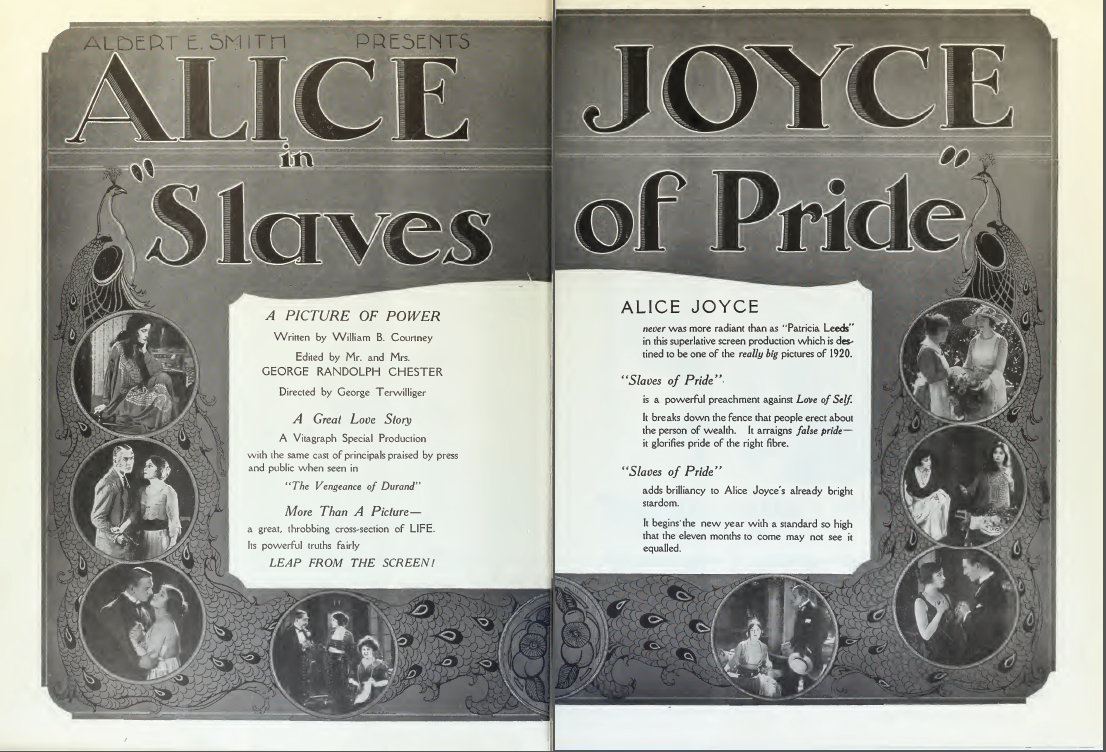
- Directed by: George Terwilliger
- Written by: William B. Courtney
- Produced by: Albert E. Smith
- Starring: Alice Joyce; Gustav von Seyffertitz; Percy Marmont
- Cinematography: Charles J. Davis; Joseph Shelderfer
- Edited by: George Randolph Chester; Lillian Christy Chester
- Production company: Vitagraph Company of America
- Distributed by: Vitagraph Company of America
- Release date: January 19, 1920
- Running time: 50 minutes
- Country: United States
- Languages: Silent; English intertitles

Slaves of Pride is a 1920 American silent drama film directed by George Terwilliger and starring Alice Joyce, Percy Marmont and Gustav von Seyffertitz.

== Cast ==
- Alice Joyce as Patricia Leeds
- Percy Marmont as Brewster Howard
- Templar Saxe as Captain Apple
- Louise Beaudet as Mrs. Leeds
- Gustav von Seyffertitz as John Reynolds
- Charles A. Stevenson as Jason Leeds

== Bibliography ==
- Langman, Larry. American Film Cycles: The Silent Era. Greenwood Publishing, 1998.
