= Blood Money (1933 film) =

1933 film

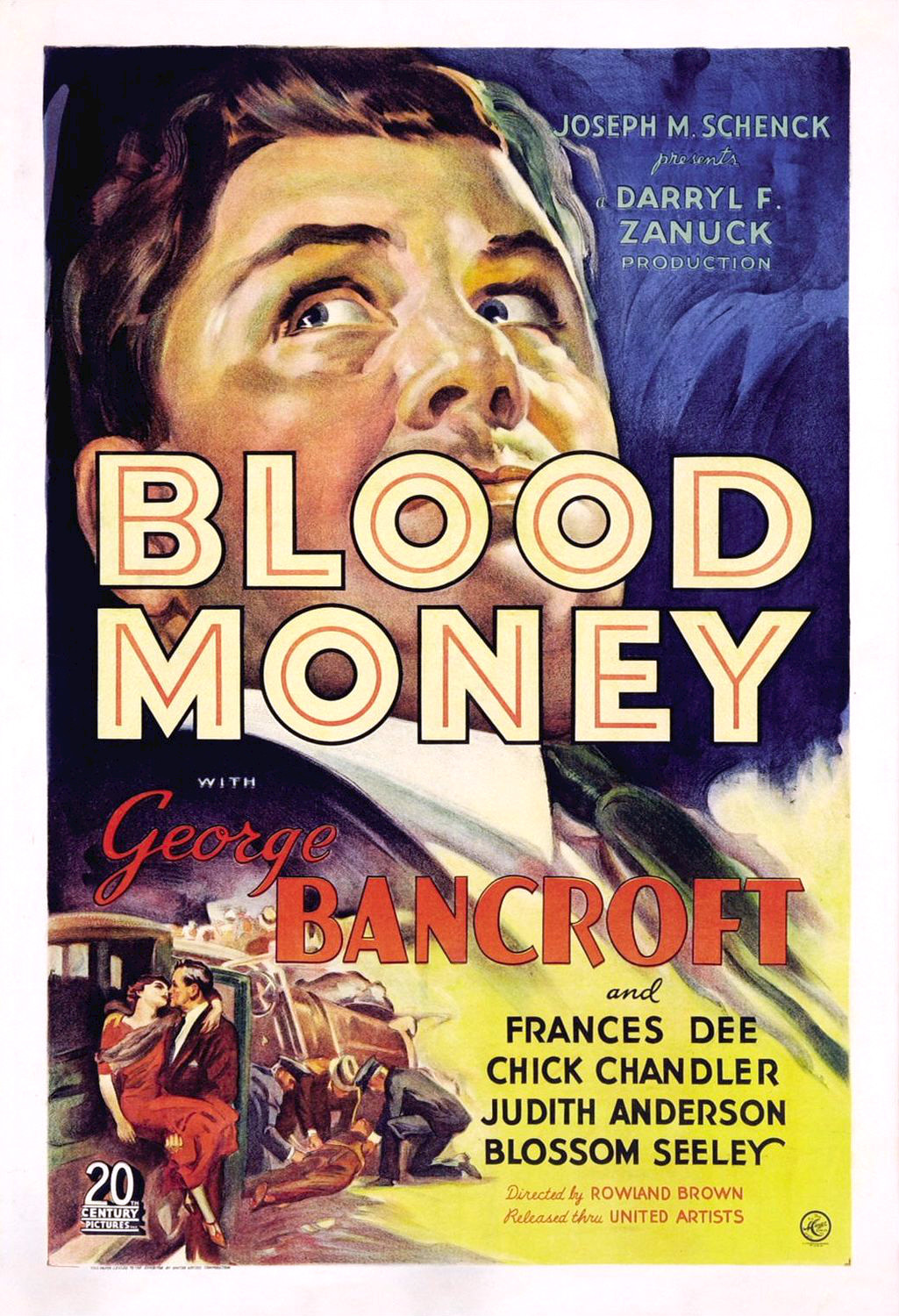
- Film poster
- Directed by: Rowland Brown
- Written by: Rowland Brown; Hal Long (continuity); Speed Kendall (uncredited)
- Produced by: Darryl F. Zanuck; Joseph M. Schenck (uncredited)
- Starring: George Bancroft; Judith Anderson; Frances Dee
- Music by: Alfred Newman
- Production company: Twentieth Century Pictures
- Distributed by: United Artists
- Release date: November 17, 1933
- Running time: 65 minutes
- Country: United States
- Language: English

Blood Money is a 1933 American Pre-Code crime drama film directed by Rowland Brown about a crooked bail bondsman named Bill Bailey, played by George Bancroft, with Chick Chandler as crime boss Drury Darling, Judith Anderson, in her film debut, as Drury's sister and Bailey's lover, and Frances Dee as a thrill-seeking, larcenous beauty who fatefully catches Bailey's eye. The film was considered to be lost for nearly forty years before reappearing.

== Cast ==
- George Bancroft as Bill Bailey
- Frances Dee as Elaine Talbart
- Chick Chandler as Drury Darling
- Judith Anderson as Ruby Darling
- Blossom Seeley as Singer
- Etienne Girardot as Bail Bond Clerk
- George Regas as Charley

Dee, normally cast in wholesome roles, described Talbert in the 2002 Turner Classic Movies documentary Complicated Women as "... a rather weird character, to say the least. She was a kleptomaniac, a nymphomaniac, and anything in between."

== Reception ==
New York Times critic Mordaunt Hall was unimpressed, writing, "This whimsical little tale of thievery, thuggery and attempted slaughter was mistaken for entertainment by Darryl Zanuck". He appreciated the skills of many of the actors, but thought the plot lacked logic and characterized the film overall as "flat stuff".
