= What Price Hollywood? =

1932 film

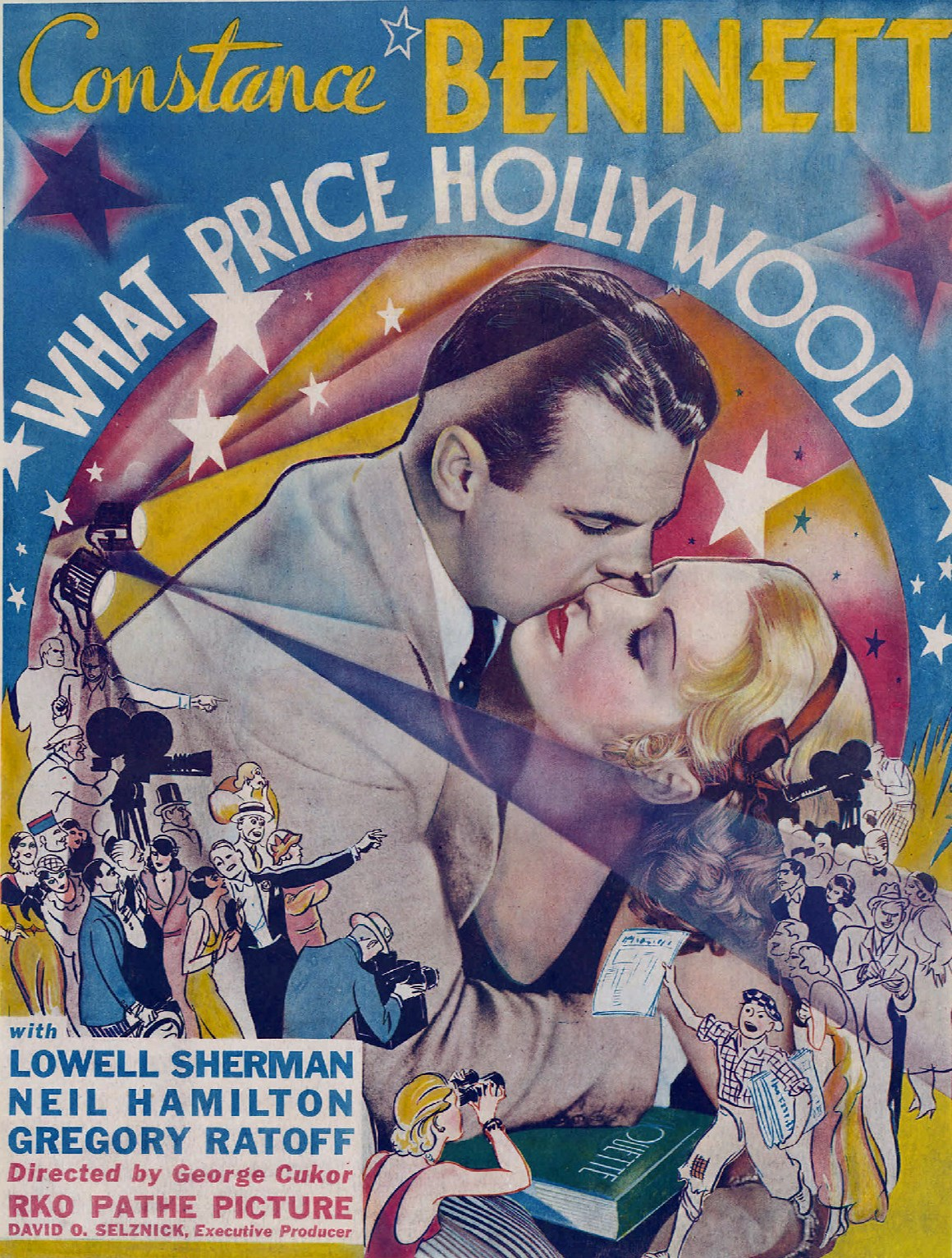
- Theater window card
- Directed by: George Cukor
- Screenplay by: Jane Murfin; Ben Markson; Allen Rivkin (uncredited)
- Story by: Adela Rogers St. Johns; Louis Stevens (uncredited)
- Produced by: Pandro S. Berman; David O. Selznick
- By: Gene Fowler; Rowland Brown
- Starring: Constance Bennett; Lowell Sherman
- Cinematography: Charles Rosher
- Edited by: Del Andrews; Jack Kitchin
- Music by: Max Steiner
- Production company: RKO Pathé
- Distributed by: RKO-Pathé Distributing Corp.
- Release date: June 2, 1932
- Running time: 88 minutes
- Country: United States
- Language: English
- Budget: $416,000
- Box office: $571,000

What Price Hollywood? is a 1932 American pre-Code drama film directed by George Cukor and starring Constance Bennett with Lowell Sherman. The screenplay by Gene Fowler, Rowland Brown, Jane Murfin and Ben Markson is based on a story by Adela Rogers St. Johns and Louis Stevens. The supporting cast features Neil Hamilton, Gregory Ratoff, Brooks Benedict, Louise Beavers and Eddie "Rochester" Anderson.

The film's plot heavily inspired that of A Star Is Born (1937), which went on to garner widespread popularity and establish a legacy that led to three remakes: A Star Is Born (1954), directed by George Cukor and starring Judy Garland and James Mason; A Star Is Born (1976), directed by Frank Pierson and starring Barbra Streisand and Kris Kristofferson; and A Star Is Born (2018), directed by and starring Bradley Cooper alongside Lady Gaga. Unlike What Price Hollywood? and the 1937 film, the three remakes are all musical films.

== Plot ==
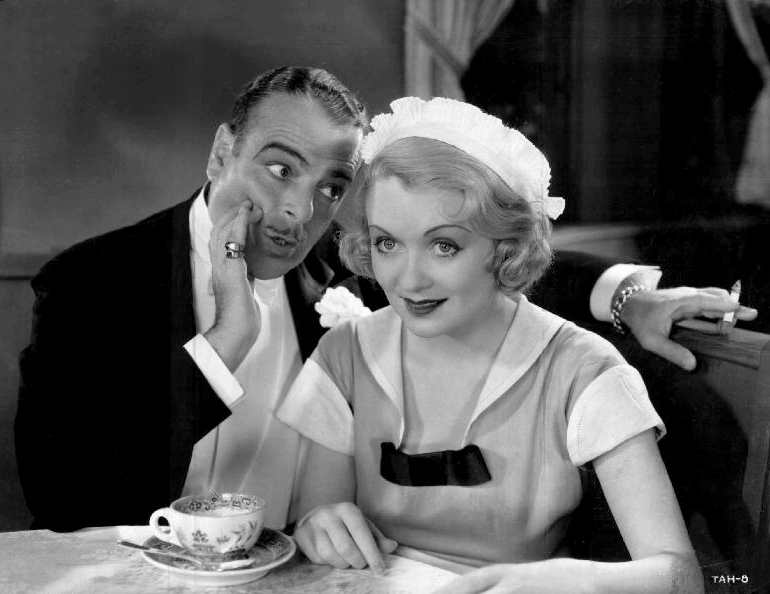
Lowell Sherman and Constance Bennett in What Price Hollywood?

Brown Derby waitress Mary Evans is an aspiring actress who meets film director Maximillan "Max" Carey in the restaurant. Max is very drunk but is charmed by Mary and he invites her to a premiere at Grauman's Chinese Theatre. Max, who has an active sense of humor, arrives to collect her in a jalopy rather than a limousine and then gives the car to the parking valet as a tip.

Max takes Mary home after the event, but the next morning he remembers nothing about the previous night. Mary reminds him that he had promised her a screen test and expresses concern about his excessive drinking and flippant attitude, but he tells her not to worry.

Mary's screen test is a miserable failure, but she begs for another chance. After extensive rehearsals, she shoots the scene again, and producer Julius Saxe is pleased with the result, signing her to a contract. Just as quickly as Mary achieves stardom, Max finds his career on the decline, and he avoids a romantic relationship with Mary so that she will not become involved in his downward spiral.

Mary meets polo player Lonny Borden, who loves her despite his jealousy of her career demands. Lonny convinces Mary to marry him although Julius and Max try to discourage her. Lonny becomes increasingly annoyed by Mary's devotion to her work and finally leaves her. After their divorce is finalized, Mary discovers that she is pregnant.

Mary wins an award for her acting, but her moment of glory is disrupted when she must post bail for Max after he is arrested for drunk driving. She takes him to her home, where he wallows in self-pity despite her encouragement. Later, alone in Mary's dressing room, he stares at himself in the mirror and compares his face to that in a photograph from long before. He finds a gun in a drawer and kills himself with a bullet to the chest.

Mary becomes the center of gossip about Max's suicide. Hoping to heal her emotional wounds, she flees to France with her son and reunites with Lonny, who begs her to forgive him and give their marriage another chance.

== Cast ==
- Constance Bennett as Mary Evans
- Lowell Sherman as Maximilian 'Max' Carey
- Neil Hamilton as Lonny Borden
- Gregory Ratoff as Julius Saxe
- Brooks Benedict as Muto, Diner Who Will Put Mary in Pictures
- Louise Beavers as Bonita, Mary's Maid
- Eddie "Rochester" Anderson as James, Max's Butler
- Torben Meyer as Nick, Headwaiter at Brown Derby

== Production ==
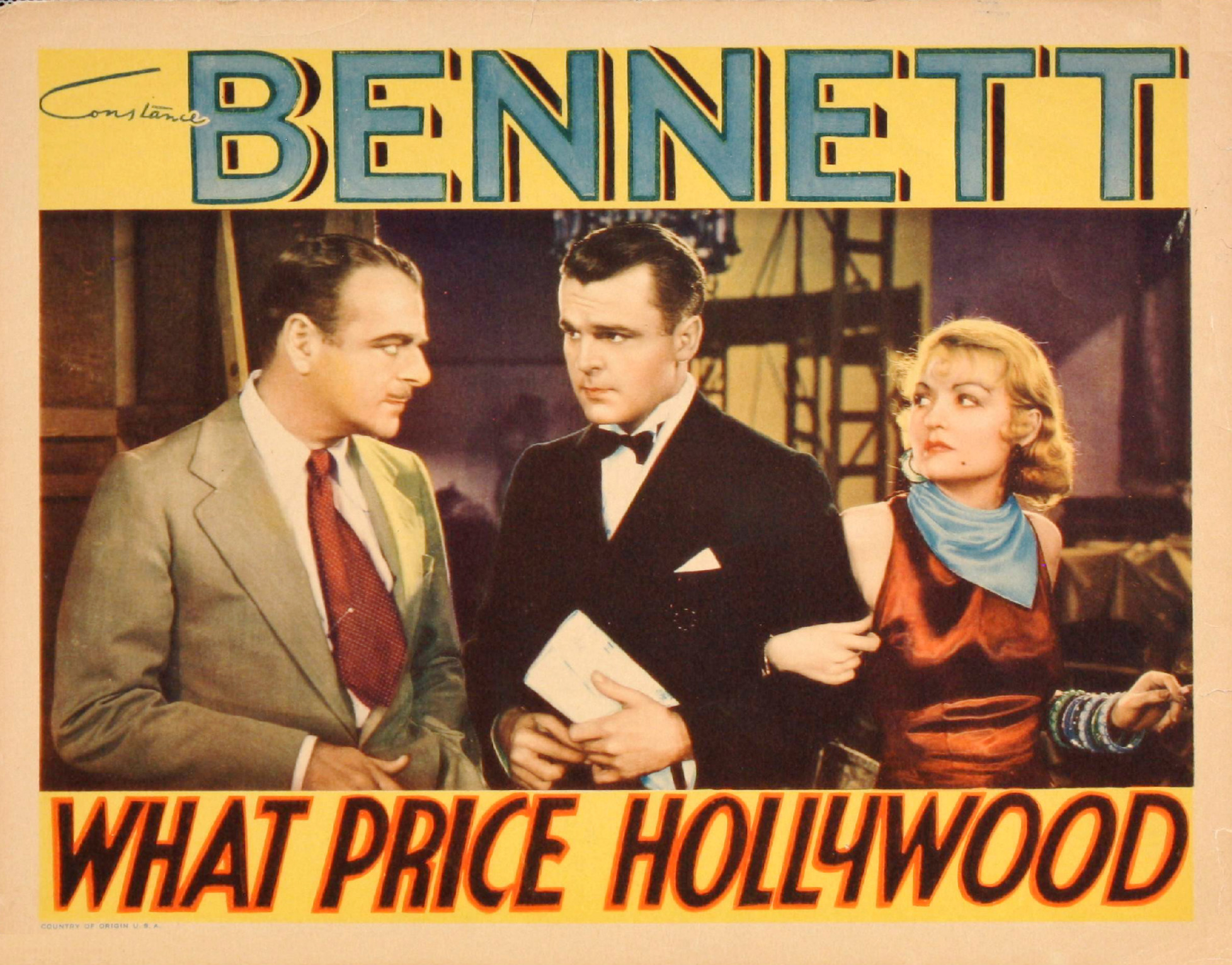
Lowell Sherman, Neil Hamilton and Constance Bennett in What Price Hollywood? (1932)

The film's original title was The Truth About Hollywood. Adela Rogers St. Johns loosely based her plot on the experiences of actress Colleen Moore and her husband, alcoholic producer John McCormick (1893–1961), and the life and death of director Tom Forman, who committed suicide following a nervous breakdown.

Producer David O. Selznick wanted to cast Clara Bow as the female lead, but executives at RKO's New York offices were hesitant to invest in a Hollywood story because similar projects had been unsuccessful in the past. By the time that Selznick convinced them that the project had potential, Bow was committed to another film. Constance Bennett considered What Price Hollywood? her greatest film.

Selznick initially promised writer-director Rowland Brown the direction of What Price Hollywood; after Brown rewrote the script, however, Selznick replaced him with George Cukor. Four years after the film was released, Selznick hired Brown to direct the next incarnation of the script, altered and renamed A Star Is Born and set to feature Janet Gaynor and Fredric March, but Brown refused to rewrite the script, saying that it required no changing, upon which Selznick fired Brown. Selznick then approached Cukor and asked him to direct, but Cukor felt the plot was still so similar to that of What Price Hollywood? that he declined. Selznick himself claimed credit for the original story. RKO executives considered filing a plagiarism suit against Selznick International Pictures because of the similarities in the story, but eventually opted against legal action. In the event, none of the original writers of What Price Hollywood? received credit. Cukor would later direct the 1954 musical version of A Star Is Born starring Judy Garland and James Mason.

Note that despite the film's interrogatory title, neither of the two contemporary posters shown here do end with that punctuation.

== Reception ==
In a contemporary review, The New York Times wrote: "Parts of 'What Price Hollywood' are very amusing, intentionally, and others are despite themselves. Sections of it are very sorrowful, in the bewildered manner of a lost scenario writer, and yet others are quite agreeable. There is some good acting in the picture—much more, indeed, than it deserves."

Variety's July 1932 review proclaimed: "It's a fan magazine-ish interpretation of Hollywood plus a couple of twists invariably known as the working girls' delight. ... Cukor tells it interestingly. Not so much for show people, perhaps, but the peasantry will like it as amusement even if it fails to fully convince them, too. Story has its exaggerations, but they can sneak under the line as theatrical license."

The film was a runaway box-office hit. However, according to RKO records, the film lost $50,000.

== Awards and honors ==
Adela Rogers St. Johns and Jane Murfin were nominated for the Academy Award for Best Story but lost to Frances Marion for The Champ.
