= The Doorway to Hell =

1930 film

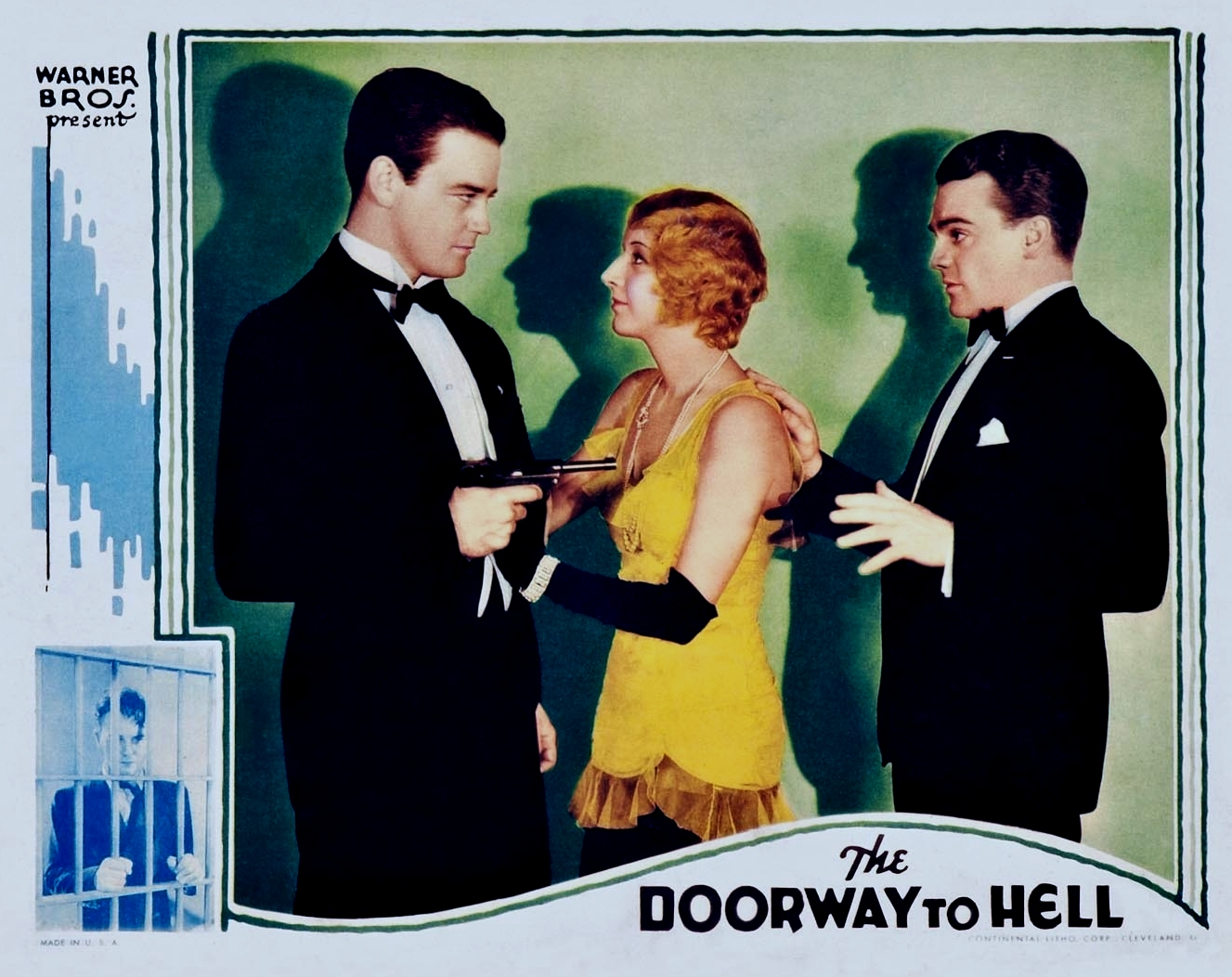
- Theatrical release poster featuring Lew Ayres and James Cagney
- Directed by: Archie Mayo
- Screenplay by: George Rosener
- Based on: Handful of Clouds by Rowland Brown
- Produced by: Darryl F. Zanuck
- Starring: Lew Ayres; James Cagney; Leon Janney
- Cinematography: Barney McGill
- Edited by: Robert O. Crandall
- Music by: Erno Rapee; Louis Silvers
- Production company: Warner Bros. Pictures, Inc.
- Release date: October 18, 1930
- Running time: 78 minutes
- Country: United States
- Language: English
- Budget: $240,000
- Box office: $688,000

The Doorway to Hell is a 1930 American pre-Code crime film directed by Archie Mayo and starring Lew Ayres and James Cagney in his second film role. The film was based on the story A Handful of Clouds, written by Rowland Brown. The film's title was typical of the sensationalistic titles of many Pre-Code films. It was marketed with the tagline "The picture Gangland defied Hollywood to make!"

== Plot ==
Full film

Louie Ricarno, the “Napoleon of the Underworld” is a young gang leader who became the most powerful underworld boss in all of Chicago due to his reputation as a ruthless gangster. He organizes all the gangs in a classic protection racket: Collecting tribute money in exchange for protection for his subordinates. The result is relative peace on the city streets and substantial profits for both him and his underlings. His main adversaries are Rocco, a rival gangster who wants the kingpin slot for himself, and Pat O’Grady, the honest police chief who has known Louie since he was an orphaned street kid. Louie also has a young brother, Jackie who goes to a military boarding school in a different city. He is proud of his successful brother but knows nothing of Louie's true business.

Louie meets Doris and immediately falls in love. However, Doris is a gold-digger who is secretly in love with Louie's best friend, Mileaway. Louie wants to get out of the rackets while the getting is good. With just one surprise last meeting to say good bye to his associates—and warn them not to try to find out where he is going Louie and Doris marry and head to Florida, stopping on the way to visit Jackie. They have dinner with the school, sitting at the head of the table with the Major. Louie observes that one of those boys might be as great as Napoleon, and that he has great hopes for Jackie. The Major replies that they are more interested in making them good citizens. When Louie says that war is a grand racket, a big business, the Major says that it is big, but it is “cruel and profitless,” which gives Louie pause.

Meanwhile, without the force of Louie's dark charisma, and money, behind it, the organization is falling to pieces. Mileaway explains to some of the gangsters that he has besieged Louie with letters and telegrams but he refuses to return: He doesn't want Doris or his kid brother mixed up in the rackets. Mileaway does not realize what he has done by revealing Jackie's existence. A violent gang war erupts.

In Florida, Louie goes off to play golf—dropping to the ground when a truck's tire blows out and then laughing at himself. Mileaway phones, and Doris tells him Louie has become “an awful dud.” He spends five hours a day writing his memoirs. Louie returns to retrieve a forgotten club, and Doris hands the phone to him. He ends by losing his temper with Mileaway and when Doris tells him his friend is right he asks her if she is “one of them.” Has she got so much hoodlum in her that it won't come out?

In order to force Louie to come back, some of the gangsters try to kidnap Jackie outside an ice cream parlor by telling him that his brother sent them. Jackie is too smart to get in the car. He runs away down the street and is accidentally hit by a truck. The three young cadets who were with Jackie identify the men in the car for O’Grady. In Florida, Louie proudly finishes his book; he expects a call from a publisher. The last line is “So this concludes the life of a gangster and begins the life of a man. Finis.” A telegram arrives from Mileaway telling Louie to come at once because Jackie has been hurt. The phone rings; the man from the publishing company wants to read the book. Stone-faced, Louie says to Doris “Tell him it’s not done yet.”

In the next scene, Louie goes to a famous plastic surgeon, shows him a snapshot of Jackie and asks if he can fix his brother's face. The doctor replies that he would have to see the patient. Louie tells him he is at Morse Brothers Undertaking Parlor. Jackie is buried—apparently on the school grounds—with military honors. His best friend stands by Louie. Swearing revenge on the two men who killed his brother—Gimpy and Midget, so-called because of his big pot belly— Louie returns to the city. His plans are threatened by Rocco and by O’Grady, who is building a case against the murderers. Louie and Mileaway kill Gimpy and dump his body in front of O’Grady's stakeout.

O’Grady comes to warn Louie not to leave town, and they share a drink. Louie admits that money doesn't always mean happiness, but on the other hand, he never would have met Doris in the first place if he hadn't been rich, and she is the happiest girl in the world. O’Grady says nothing as he catches a glimpse in a mirror of Mileaway and Doris holding hands.

Louie sends Mileaway and Doris off for the evening so he can deal with the Midget himself. “Where do you want to go?” she asks. “I could think of a thousand places if you weren’t married to Louie.” She takes off her ring and tucks it into Mileaway's hand. “Now where do you want to go?” He turns his head toward her, leans down for a kiss and—fade out.

Louie waits for Midget in a dry-cleaners, shades drawn. Midget, who thinks he is getting a payoff, tells his two bodyguards to wait on the street. He goes inside and at a signal from a man watching, a half-dozen drivers jump into their trucks and warm up their engines, revving the motors so they backfire repeatedly. The bodyguards flee. Louie washes his hands at a filthy sink. Three trucks pull away.

At 3 am, Mileaway and Doris come to the apartment to find O’Grady, who has been waiting there for two hours to arrest Mileaway for killing the Midget. Louie is already in jail. The cops give Mileaway the third degree but he doesn't flinch until O’Grady mentions “the house in Charleston Street” (where he and Doris were together). Mileaway signs the confession O’Grady has ready. For killing the Midget in self-defense, he will get 5 years and then be able to enjoy his money. On the way to his cell, he stops at Louie's cell and tells Louie he will be free soon. Grady tells Mileaway that Louie is being held for Gimpy's murder. His confession has not helped his friend. Louie thanks Mileaway for the try and says to O’Grady, What a friend! O’Grady remains silent.

Louie reads an ad in the personals column alerting him to a breakout. He pretends to be sick, knocks out the guard escorting him to the hospital and escapes. He hides out in a dingy room decorated with pictures of his hero, Napoleon — one is titled Napoleon in Exile. He hears a newsboy in the street and calls him up to the apartment. The paper is full of the gang war. He asks the kid to get him some groceries, and when he returns the innocent youth tells him that he met a friend of his, O’Grady, who also knows Louie. Louie sends the boy on his way and soon O’Grady comes to the door. He is unarmed. He has bad news for Louie: His prison break was engineered by his enemies. Two mobs are outside waiting to blast him. He was safe in jail. O’Grady won't arrest him now because they don't have enough evidence to convict him. But he is a menace to society, and must be dealt with. Louie is sure that Mileaway will take care of Doris when he gets out. O’Grady does not disillusion him about them. He leaves, telling Louie he ‘ll see him in 30 or 40 years. A waiter arrives from a restaurant around the corner with a last supper from the boys: a steak dinner, complete with a cigar, already lit. Laughing, Louie tosses his gun on the bed, on top of the newspaper, adjusts his tie and fedora in the mirror and puts the cigar in his mouth at a jaunty angle. He pauses for a moment in the open doorway, looking at a picture of Napoleon, then closes the door. The next sound is machine guns.

== Cast ==
- Lew Ayres as Louie Ricarno
- Charles Judels as Florist (scenes deleted)
- Dorothy Mathews as Doris
- Leon Janney as Jackie
- Robert Elliott as O'Grady
- James Cagney as Mileaway
- Kenneth Thomson as Capt. of Academy
- Jerry Mandy as Gangster
- Noel Madison as Rocco
- Eddie Kane as Dr. Morton
- Tom Wilson as Gangster
- Dwight Frye as Gangster

== Reception ==
The New York Times called the film "plausible and cruel". Their review continues, "Lewis Ayres, although perhaps too much the clean-cut young college boy to have a hand in such business, plays excellently..."

A recent review by Allmovie that was reprinted in The New York Times noted that the picture was "an innovative film and featured a lot of elements that would become standards in the gangster genre including tommy guns carried in violin cases, terrible shoot-outs, and lots of rum-running rivalry."

The film received an Academy Award nomination for Best Writing, Screenplay.

== Preservation status ==
A print is preserved in the Library of Congress collection.

== Notes ==
- Doherty, Thomas Patrick. Pre-Code Hollywood: Sex, Immorality, and Insurrection in American Cinema 1930-1934. New York: Columbia University Press 1999. ISBN 0-231-11094-4
