= Our Wives (film) =

1913 film

- Directed by: James Lackaye
- Written by: Anthony E. Wills
- Starring: Harry T. Morey; Louise Beaudet
- Distributed by: Vitagraph Studios
- Release date: September 20, 1913
- Country: United States
- Languages: silent film English intertitles

Our Wives is a 1913 comedy short silent film directed by James Lackaye for Vitagraph Studios. It premiered on September 20, 1913. The film's story was adapted from Anthony E. Wills's three act play Our Wives (1910). Wills was a playwright and novelist who died young in 1912. Vitagraph Studios purchased the film rights to all of Wills's works in 1913.

== Cast ==
- Harry T. Morey ... Rosweel Chandler
- Louise Beaudet ... Mrs. Rosweel Chandler
- Lillian Walker ... Belle
- Wally Van ... Walter Blair
- Ada Gifford ... Hilda Deveaux
- Charles Brown ... Oscar Simbel
- Frank O'Neil ... Mallory
- Niles Welch ... Stanton
- Ethel Lloyd ... Julia

== Plot ==
After his wife leaves him she tries to rekindle their relationship after the man finds success and a new love.
