= Ernest Gustave Girardot =

French painter (1840–1904)

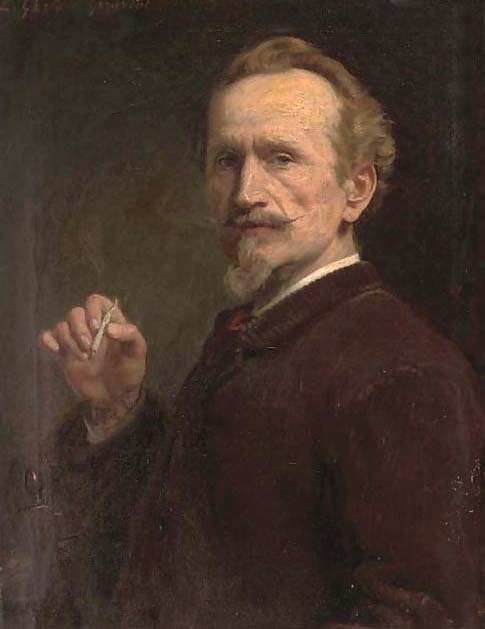
Self-portrait of Ernest Gustave Girardot

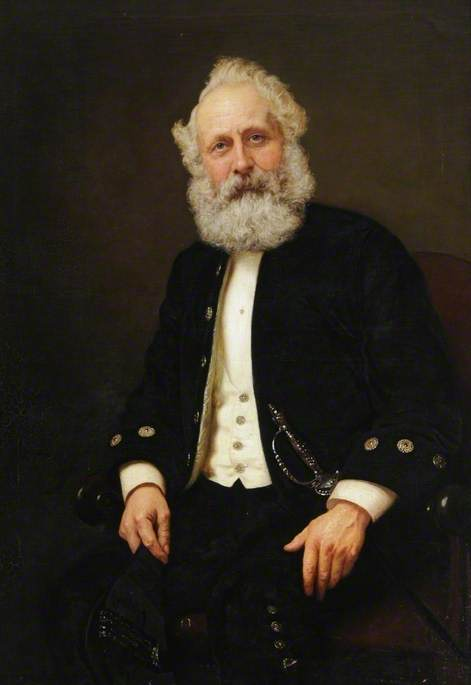
"Portrait of a Nineteenth-Century Gentleman in Court Dress"

Ernest Gustave Girardot (English: /ʒiːˈrɑːrdoʊ/ zhee-RAR-doh, French: [ɛʁnɛst ɡystav ʒiʁaʁdo]; 1840–1904) was born into a well-known artistic French family and worked as a genre and portrait painter throughout his life. His portraits of Tennyson and Lady Lytton are held in high regard.

Girardot exhibited between 1880 and 1904 at the Royal Academy in London, the Glasgow Institute of the Fine Arts, Royal Hibernian Academy, Royal Scottish Academy and Walker Art Gallery in Liverpool. He became a member of the Society of British Artists in 1874.

Girardot's home and workplace were at first in Notting Hill and later at 'The Studio', Upper Park Road, Haverstock Hill, London. He was a friend and correspondent of James McNeill Whistler and many of their letters have survived.

Ernest Gustave Girardot had a son and daughter – the son, Etienne Girardot (1856–1939), who initially studied to become a painter, later became an acclaimed stage and screen actor.
