= Beau Brummel (1913 film) =

- Directed by: James Young
- Written by: Eugene Mullin
- Based on: Play by Clyde Fitch, c. 1890 (Note: Some sources erroneously credit Booth Tarkington as the creator of this story in a novel. Beau Brummel is an historical play by Clyde Fitch written for stage star Richard Mansfield. Booth Tarkington wrote a novel Monsieur Beaucaire.)
- Produced by: Vitagraph Company of America
- Starring: James Young; Clara Kimball Young; Julia Swayne Gordon
- Distributed by: General Film Company
- Release date: February 19, 1913
- Running time: 1000 feet (approximately 10-15 minutes)
- Country: USA

Beau Brummel is a 1913 silent short film directed by and starring James Young in the title role. Presumed now to be lost, it was produced in Brooklyn, New York, by Vitagraph Studios and also featured in its cast Clara Kimball Young, Rex Ingram, Julia Swayne Gordon, and Etienne Girardot. The photoplay's scenario was adapted from the Clyde Fitch novel and play, and upon the film's release Vitagraph listed it as a 1000-foot "one-reeler", which at the time would have had a maximum running time of 15 minutes.

On stage, in 1890, Richard Mansfield originally starred in Beau Brummell on Broadway. (Note: The spelling of "Brummell" (or "Brummel") varies in source citations as well as in titles of film productions portraying the character. Although the title of this film and of the 1924 remake are consistently given as Brummel, the correct spelling of the surname is generally accepted to be Brummell, which is the spelling used in the title of the 1954 film.) Other film adaptations were produced in both the silent and sound eras, including the 1924 remake starring John Barrymore and Mary Astor and the 1954 version with Stewart Granger, Elizabeth Taylor and Peter Ustinov.

== Cast ==
- James Young - Beau Brummell
- Clara Kimball Young - Helen Ballarat
- Charles Chapman - The Prince of Wales (the later George IV)
- Julia Swayne Gordon - The Duchess
- Edward R. Phillips - Lord Ballarat (*as E. R. Phillips)
- James Morrison - Lord Alvanley
- Etienne Girardot - Isadore, Brummel's Valet
- Rex Ingram - (*billed as Rex Hitchcock)
- Richard Leslie - Lord Beaconsfield (*as Dick Leslie)
- Helene Costello - Child
