= Quick Millions (1931 film) =

1931 film by Rowland Fox

- Directed by: Rowland Brown
- Written by: Rowland Brown; Courtney Terrett
- Produced by: William Fox
- Starring: Spencer Tracy; Marguerite Churchill; Sally Eilers; George Raft
- Cinematography: Joseph H. August
- Distributed by: Fox Film Corporation
- Release date: April 17, 1931
- Running time: 72 minutes
- Country: United States
- Language: English

Quick Millions is a 1931 pre-Code crime film directed by Rowland Brown and starring Spencer Tracy, Marguerite Churchill, Sally Eilers, and featuring George Raft as the sidekick with a solo eccentric dance performance.

It was the first of only three films directed by Rowland Brown.

== Plot ==
Daniel "Bugs" Raymond is a truck driver who is tired of working for a living and not getting ahead. He realizes the trucks and their drivers are making the business owners rich and hatches a protection racket where he controls the use of the trucks and men to drive them. Along the way, he sees Dorothy Stone, a wealthy woman "with class", and wants her, although he has a girlfriend, Daisy. Dorothy is engaged to another. Bugs maneuvers his way into the business of Dorothy's brother (who recognizes he will lose everything without Bugs) and participates in society. Bugs and his buddies steal incriminating evidence from corrupt politicians and law enforcement in order to keep them from going after the protection racket. There are great scenes of the gang, including a dance number of Jimmy Kirk. Kirk is one of Raymond's lieutenants and he commits murder for hire of a journalist for one of Raymond's competitors, "Nails", who wants to take over the lucrative racket. Bugs then has to take care of Kirk, and society has had enough of the lawlessness and racketeering. The newsreels and politicians speak out against Bugs, making him angry. He decides to crash "in morning coats" Dorothy's society wedding with all his gang and show how he is now a part of society. He delivers his philosophy of how he is as much law-abiding as those in power. Daisy is upset, feeling some foreboding. On their way to the wedding, and during a wedding montage, Bugs is assassinated by Nails and the story comes to an end.

== Cast ==
- Spencer Tracy as Daniel Raymond
- Marguerite Churchill as Dorothy Stone
- Sally Eilers as Daisy De Lisle
- Bob Burns as Arkansas Smith
- John Wray as Kenneth Stone
- Warner Richmond as "Nails" Markey
- George Raft as Jimmy Kirk
- John Swor as Contractor
- Leon Ames as Hood (as Leon Waycoff)
- Ward Bond as Cop in Montage (uncredited)

== Production ==
Rowland Brown had wanted to break into Hollywood but not succeeded until he sold Doorway to Hell. He then wrote Skyline and persuaded Fox to let him direct. The film was also known as Hoodlum.

The film gave an early role to George Raft who had been spotted dancing by director Rowland Brown. According to the Los Angeles Times "Brown was looking for menace with sex appeal" and Raft was filming the day after Brown first saw him. (Another account says Raft was recommended to Brown by Owney Madden.) The fact that this was Raft's first major role in a narrative feature film accounts for his low billing (seventh in the cast) despite the large size of his supporting part. Raft played an extremely similar role the following year in Scarface (1932) starring Paul Muni, which catapulted his career into stardom.

== Reception ==
The Los Angeles Times called it "unrelieved, unrelenting... gray and cold and harsh."

The New York Times said it was "endowed with originality and suspense" and was "exceeding well directed and ably acted."

According to Filmink magazine "Raft was chosen for his 'seductive menace' and it was a decent part – flirting with girls, bumping off fellow gangsters, being shot down by Tracy. Raft wasn't much of a technical actor – he never would be, not really – but he had swarthy good looks, moved with a dancer's grace and brought authenticity to any role that involved speakeasies, shoot outs and nightclubs."
