= The Devil Is a Sissy =

1936 American comedy drama film

- Poster
- Directed by: W.S. Van Dyke and Rowland Brown
- Written by: Rowland Brown (story)
- Screenplay by: John Lee Mahin; Richard Schayer; Frank Frenton; Cyril Hume
- Produced by: Frank Davis
- Starring: Freddie Bartholomew; Jackie Cooper; Mickey Rooney
- Cinematography: Harold Rosson
- Edited by: Tom Held
- Music by: Herbert Stothart
- Production company: Metro-Goldwyn-Mayer
- Distributed by: Loew's, Inc.
- Release date: September 18, 1936
- Running time: 92 minutes
- Country: United States
- Language: English

The Devil Is a Sissy is a 1936 American MGM comedy-drama film directed by W. S. Van Dyke and Rowland Brown. The film stars Freddie Bartholomew, Jackie Cooper and Mickey Rooney, three of the biggest child stars of the 1930s.

The film premiered on September 18, 1936.

== Plot ==
Claude Pierce is an aristocratic and well-bred boy from England, whose parents have received a divorce. According to a child custody agreement signed by his parents, Claude will spend six months living with his father. Jay Pierce, the father in question, has settled in New York City, where he works as an architect. Claude starts attending a public school in New York City.

Claude's "polished" manners make him stand out among his schoolmates, and the other children start playing pranks on him. He soon gets on the bad side of two lower-class children, Robert "Buck" Murphy and James "Gig" Stevens. Gig is in a dark mood at the time, because his father is about to be executed for murder. Finding himself the target of the other boys' anger, Claude decides to learn self-defense. Claude takes boxing lessons, which help him beat Buck in a street fight. He wins his opponent's grudging respect and starts befriending his former tormentors.

At a later point, Gig's father has already been executed at the electric chair, and Gig lacks the money to provide a headstone for his father's grave. He really wants to buy that headstone and starts seeking ways to earn enough money for it. Gig initially tries to get money from his aunt Rose Hawley, who is a kept woman and financially secure. He fails to explain what he intends to do with the money, so Rose refuses to help him. Gig decides to raise the money by stealing, and convinces his friend Buck to help him. However, their initial attempts at crime fail.

Claude learns of the problem, and instructs his new friends to start "stealing from the rich" and to emulate a fictional role model, gentleman thief A. J. Raffles. Claude personally orchestrates a robbery at a house that is vacant and unguarded. The trio steal toys which they can sell at a pawn shop to raise money. The robbery and visit to the pawn shop go as planned, but the three juvenile delinquents are then arrested by a police officer who finds their activities suspicious.

The boys appear at court, where it is noted that nobody has reported the robbery. Claude explains that it was a fake robbery to begin with. He led his friends into looting his mother's house, and those toys belonged to Claude himself. He was just trying to help them out. The judge finds Claude innocent of any actual crime, but still finds that Buck and Gig acted with criminal intent. He places the two boys on probation, and they now have to make regular reports to a probation officer. Buck and Gig blame Claude for their fate and angrily sever ties with him.

Buck and Gig decide to become runaways and flee from their families and their probation officer. Claude learns of their plans and decides to follow them, in hopes of convincing them to return home. Claude shows symptoms of illness at this point, but he attributes them to a common cold and pays no attention to them. The three boys meet at the local cemetery, under heavy rain. They check the recently erected gravestone for Gig's father.

The boys hitch-hike and are picked by a passing vehicle. The vehicle belongs to a trio of criminals trying to escape the authorities, and the boys distrust their intentions. The six of them stop for a meal at a diner, where Claude covertly alerts the police. While the criminals face the police in a shootout, the boys escape. Claude's symptoms are getting worse, and he has both fever and delirium. Buck and Gig are getting worried and decide to take Claude to a hospital. Claude is diagnosed with pneumonia.

As Buck and Gig decide to get in contact with their probation officer, Claude's mother, Hilda Pierce defies the doctor and takes Claude to another hospital, but Claude's condition gets worse following the transport. Buck and Gig decide to tell their seemingly dying friend how much they care for him. The encouragement helps in Claude's recovery. The film ends with the three boys—and Rose and Jay—happily going on a bicycle ride in Central Park.

== Cast ==
- Freddie Bartholomew as Claude 'Limey' Pierce
- Jackie Cooper as Robert 'Buck' Murphy
- Mickey Rooney as James 'Gig' Stevens
- Ian Hunter as Jay Pierce
- Katharine Alexander as Hilda Pierce
- Peggy Conklin as Rose Hawley
- Gene Lockhart as Mr. Jim 'Murph' Murphy
- Kathleen Lockhart as Mrs. Murphy
- Jonathan Hale as Judge Holmes
- Etienne Girardot as Mr. Crusenberry, the Principal
- Sherwood Bailey as Bugs
- Buster Slaven as Six-Toes
- Grant Mitchell as Paul Krumpp
- Stanley Fields as Joe, a Gangster
- Harold Huber as Willie, a Gangster
- Frank Puglia as 'Grandma', a Gangster
- Etta McDaniel as Molly, Rose's Maid

== Production ==
The film is apparently based on a screenplay called The Devil Is a Sissie, which screenwriters Rowland Brown and Frank Frenton were working on in 1935. Brown is the one credited as the main writer of the film, with the extent of Fenton's contribution unclear. Other screenwriters were responsible for the final form of the screenplay.

Publicity for the film focused on the change in directors in mid-production. Initially Rowland Brown was announced as the sole director of the film. During filming, came news reports that director W. S. Van Dyke was hired to "assist" Brown. A few days later, it was announced that Van Dyke had replaced Brown as the sole director of the film. The reasons of the replacement were not explained. In Sixty Years of Hollywood, John Baxter Brown had punched the film's producer, Frank Davis, and that this resulted in Brown's being replaced as director of the film. According to the American Film Institute, this was the fourth time that Brown had started directing a film, only to be replaced by another director in mid-production.

While Rowland Brown is still credited as co-director of the film in several sources, apparently only one or two scenes of the film were directed by him. According to 1936 news reports, most of the scenes that Brown had filmed were discarded and had to be reshot by W. S. Van Dyke. The official credits of the film name Van Dyke as sole director.
