= Louise Beaudet =

Canadian actress

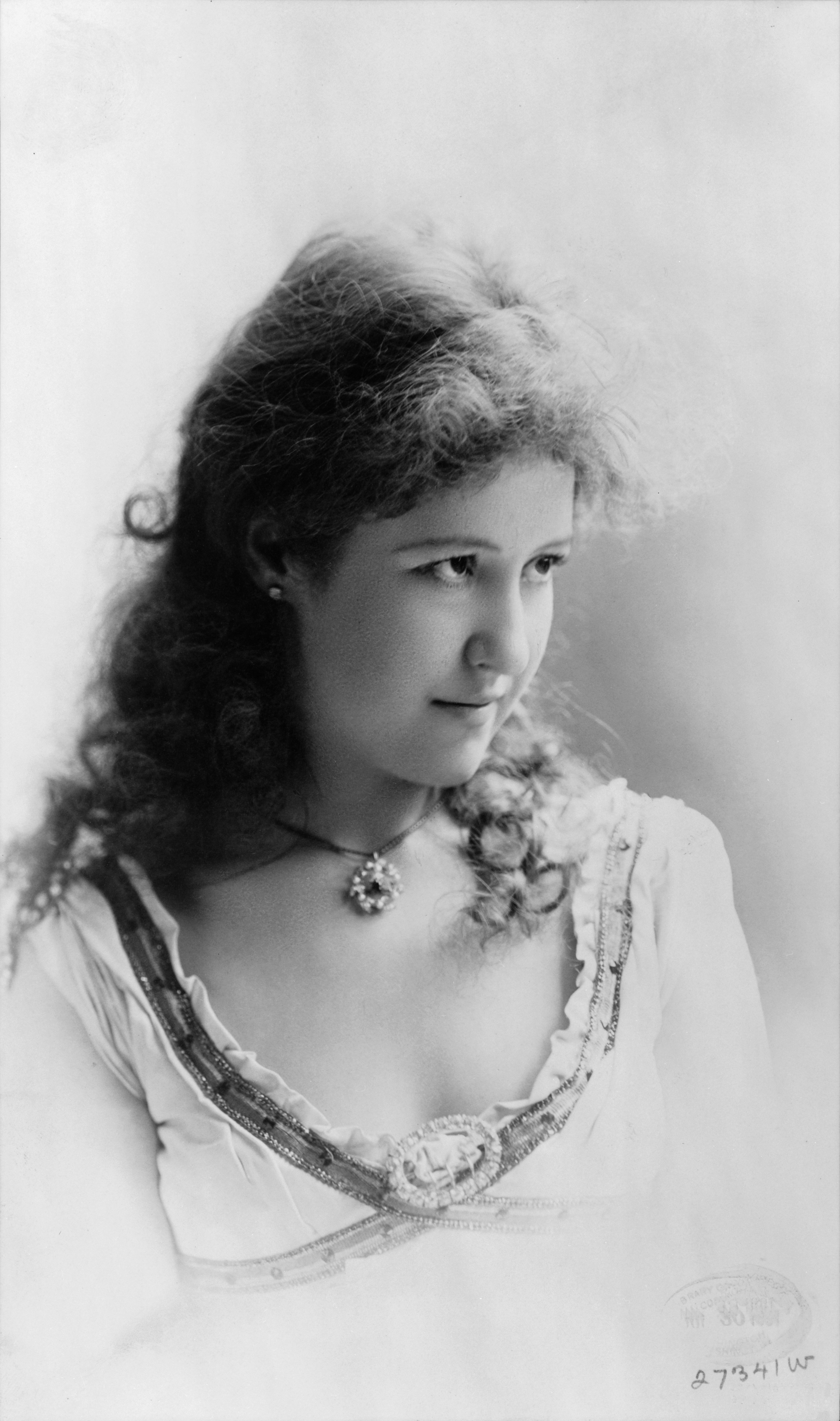
- Beaudet in her early 20s
- Born: Marie Louise Anna Beaudet; December 5, 1859; Lotbinière, Canada East
- Died: December 31, 1947 (aged 88); New York City, New York, U.S.
- Resting place: Calvary Cemetery, Woodside, New York

Marie Louise Anna Beaudet (December 5, 1859 – December 31, 1947) was a Canadian actress, singer and dancer for more than 50 years, starred in stage productions ranging from comic opera to Shakespeare, as well as music-hall and vaudeville, and appeared in 66 silent films.

== Biography ==
Although she would say that she was born in Tours, France, Marie Louise Anna Beaudet was baptised in the parish of Saint-Louis-de-Lotbinière, united province of Canada, in December 1859. She was the ninth child of Marie-Élisabeth (Eliza) Jobin dit Boisvert (born 1824) and farmer Clément Beaudet (1817–1863). The tragic loss of her father in 1863 and the subsequent move to Montréal deeply affected her childhood years. She was uprooted again in 1870 when her mother married Nathaniel B. Clapp and settled in Boston, Massachusetts. Eliza divorced her second husband six years later and moved to New York City with Louise and eldest daughter Marie Arceline (Amy).

Louise performed in amateur productions of H.M.S. Pinafore before being "discovered" by actor Frank Drew of the famous Drew-Barrymore clan who offered her the role of Violet in his production of The Life of an Artist and the major role of Fanchon in Fanchon, The Cricket, in January and February 1879, at the Budlong's Opera House in Jersey City. In March of that year, she was hired by James C. Duff to play the duchess in The Little Duke at Booth's Theatre in New York and in the fall, Maurice Grau's French Opera Company gave her the same role of Blanche, la duchesse de Parthenay, in the American version of Le Petit Duc. The French actress Maire-Aimée Tronchon, known as M^{lle} Aimée, who starred in this production, took Louise under her wing. "Anything that I have ever done in comic opera I owe to Aimée", she would later confide to Alan Dale.^{[3]}

Shortly after, she joined the Baldwin Theatre Stock Company of San Francisco where she played the ingénue roles. It was there that she met one of the greatest dramatic actors of that period the actor Daniel E. Bandmann who encouraged her to take on more serious roles and with whom she became romantically involved. They founded a theatrical touring company, Beaudet playing all of Shakespeare's principal female roles to Bandmann's leading men. They toured the world together for nearly four years, covering more than 70,000 miles. ^{[10]} They continued touring successfully in North America and England with such productions as A Strange Case, Dr. Jekyll & Mr. Hyde, Narcisse, East Lynn, The Corsican Brothers, etc. before ending their famous relationship in 1889.

In August of that year, "Little Miss Beaudet" returned to the New York stage as a member of the James C. Duff Opera Company and rapidly became one of the "petites" favourites playing such roles as: Chilina in the comic opera Paola, or the First of the Vendettas, Maid Marian in Robin Hood and his Merry Men or Babes in the Woods, Pitti-Sing in The Mikado, Edith in Pirates of Penzance, Iolanthe in Iolanthe, Lady Angela in Patience, Christel in The Tyrolean and "la Jolie Plaignante" in Trial by Jury.

In March 1891, Rudolph Aronson asked her to join his Casino Theatre Company for the theatrical season. Louise Beaudet played Paresina in the opera Apollo; or the Oracle of Delphi with Lillian Russell, Toffana in the adaptation of the burlesque opera Indigo, then again Christel in The Tyrolean, co-starring Marie Tempest and also Frinke in The Jolly Students.

In 1892, she accepted the principal female role of Elizabeth in Pauline Hall's production of the comic opera in two acts Puritania, or the Earl and the Maid of Salem.

In 1893, Beaudet starred in the eight-month run of Imre Kiralfy's America during the World's Columbian Exposition in Chicago, then began her own touring opera company, performing repertoire of French Opéra bouffe. They presented Jacinta, the Maid of Manzanillo at the Castle Square Theatre in Boston and at Miner's Fifth Avenue Theatre in New York with Louise in the leading role and The Dragoon's Daughter in Boston and Chicago before breaking-up the company due to the lack of funds.

In 1895, she was hired by the great George Edwardes to replace Marie Tempest in the production of An Artist's Model at Daly's Theatre in London, England. The role of Adele gave her the chance to display her lovely mezzo-soprano voice in popular songs such as : Love is a Man's Delight, a Fancy of Today; On a Silent Summer's Night, When the Moon Shone Clear and Bright. She then toured quite successfully throughout England with Mr. Edwardes's theatrical company.

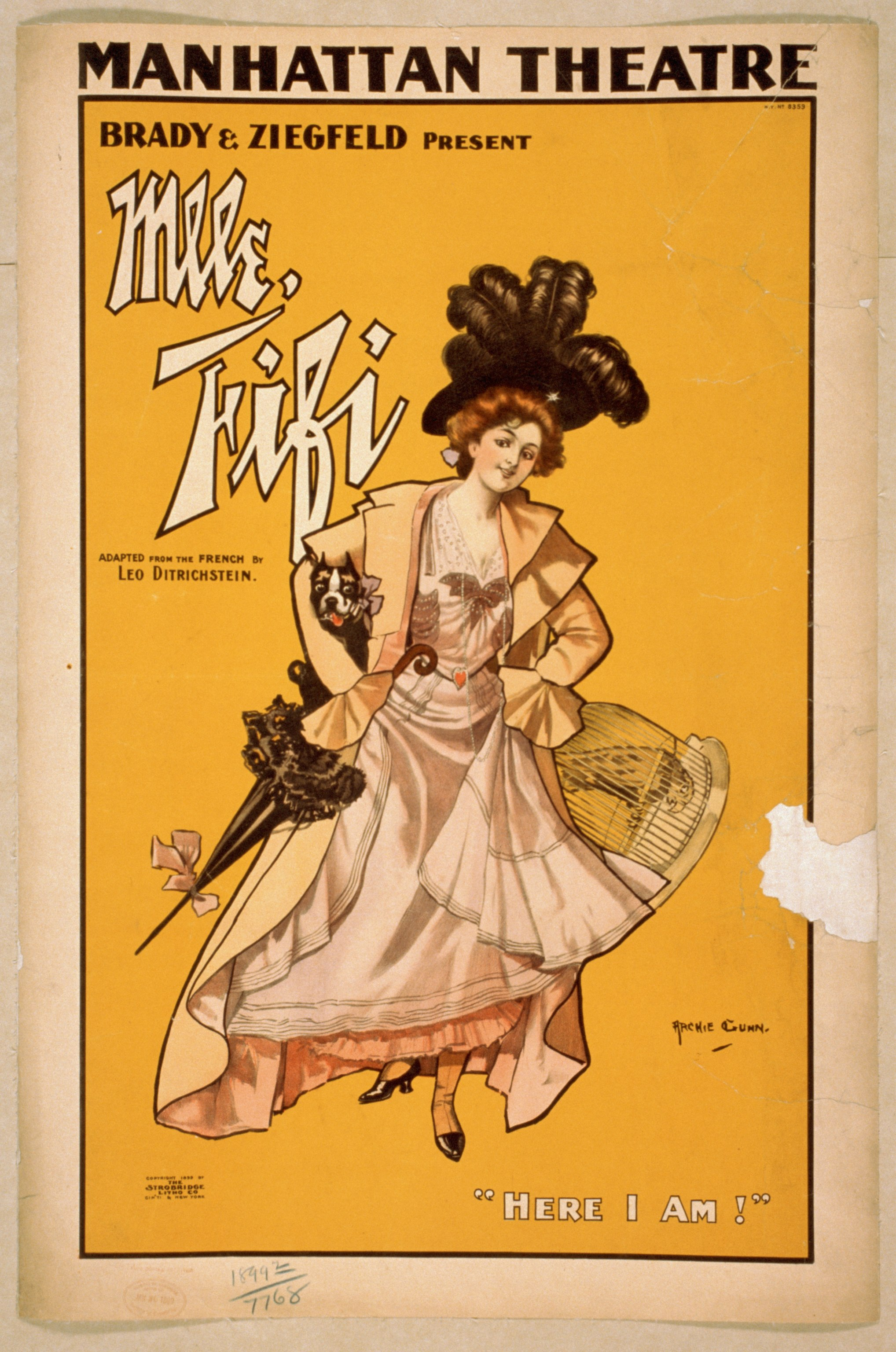
Poster for Mademoiselle Fifi starring Louise Beaudet (1899)

Between 1896 and 1899, Louise Beaudet was at the height of her popularity as a music-hall and vaudeville queen. She became one of the best paid stage performers. In June 1897, she was invited at Buckingham Palace for a Royal Command Performance before Queen Victoria .^{[11]}

In 1912, she joined the Edison Studios in the Bronx and then the Company Players at Vitagraph Studios in Manhattan. She wrote a few scenarios and played supporting roles in sixty-six black and white silent films, including Heartbroken Shep (1913) with Helen Costello, Sawdust and Salome (1914) with Van Dyke Brooke, My Official Wife (1914) with Clara Kimball Young, The Battle Cry of Peace/A Call to Arms Against War (1915) where she was acclaimed for bringing educational acting to the screen ^{[12]}, A Price for Folly (1915) with Edith Storey, Her Lord and Master (1921) with Alice Joy and The Gold Diggers (1923) with Hope Hampton. Her last appearance on screen was in 1926 at the age of 67.

But Louise Beaudet continued to perform on Broadway and in theatres in Baltimore, Washington, Philadelphia, Cleveland, Boston and Chicago until her retirement in 1934.

She died on December 31, 1947, in City Hospital, Manhattan, aged 88. She is buried with her sister Arcelina Martel at Calvary Cemetery, in Woodside, New York. The fact that she always refused to divulge her true age explains why the dates on her death certificate and on her tombstone are erroneous. She left no descendants.

== Filmography ==
Year	Title	Role	Notes
1912	Young Mrs. Eaton	Mrs. Van Zandt	Short
1913	Cutey Plays Detective	Mrs. Trevor - the Mother	Short
1913	One Can't Always Tell	The Old Housekeeper	Short
1913	An Infernal Tangle	Mrs. Thomas - the Charitable Woman	Short
1913	The Snare of Fate	Mrs. Beaudet, Marion's Mother	Short
1913	Bingles and the Cabaret		Short
1913	A Sweet Deception		Short
1913	The Glove		Short
1913	Count Barber	Mme. de Bluff	Short
1913	My Lady of Idleness	Mrs. Williams	Short
1913	The Late Mr. Jones	Matilda Jones, a Widow	Short
1913	Sauce for the Goose	Mabel, Jim's Wife	Short
1913	Our Wives	Mrs. Rosweel Chandler	Short
1913	Which?	The Twins' Mother	Short
1913	Heartbroken Shep	Runa's Mother	Short
1913	Heartsease	The Governess	Short
1914	Jerry's Uncle's Namesake	Jerry's Wife	Short
1914	Bunny's Mistake		Short
1914	Pickles, Art and Sauerkraut	Jerry's Mother-in-Law	Short
1914	Sawdust and Salome	Mrs. John Grey	Short
1914	Mrs. Maloney's Fortune		Short
1914	Tangled Tangoists		Short
1914	Setting the Style	Mrs. Vandergilt - a Gentlewoman	Short
1914	Mr. Bunny in Disguise		Short
1914	Cutey's Wife	Mlle. Denise	Short
1914	Father's Flirtation	Mrs. Sweet - the Widow	Short
1914	My Official Wife	Olga	Short
1914	Second Sight	Mrs. Ponsonby	Short
1914	The Man Who Knew		Short
1914	His Wedded Wife		Short
1914	The Senator's Brother	Paul Zanes' Second Wife	Short
1914	The Man Behind the Door	Lavinia Backsetter	
1914	An Affair for the Police	Mrs. Van Austin	Short
1915	The Man, the Mission and the Maid		Short
1915	The Slightly Worn Gown		Short
1915	The Wheels of Justice	Mrs. Brooks, Ralph's Mother	
1915	The Millionaire's Hundred Dollar Bill	Milly	Short
1915	Peggy of Fifth Avenue	Aunt Sarah	Short
1915	Cutey Becomes a Landlord		Short
1915	The Goddess	Kidnapper	
1915	What's Ours?	Mrs. Burke	Short
1915	The Silent W		Short
1915	The Battle Cry of Peace	Mrs. Vandergriff	
1915	The Kidnapped Stockbroker		Short
1915	The Shadow of Fear	Aunt Mary	Short
1915	The Butterfly's Lesson	Leila's Mother	Short
1915	On the Turn of a Card		Short
1915	To Cherish and Protect	Marie Pratt	Short
1915	The Shabbies		Short
1915	A 'Model' Wife	Madame Helene	Short
1915	A Price for Folly	Duchess de Segni	
1915	The Flower of the Hills	Jack's Aunt	Short
1915	On Her Wedding Night	Mrs. Carter	
1916	Green Stockings	Ida Faraday	
1916	The Road of Many Turnings	Mrs. Wagner	Short
1916	The Law Decides	Mrs. Wharton	
1916	Billie's Mother	Louise - Billie's Mother	Short
1916	The Musical Barber	Mother	Short
1917	The Price She Paid	Mrs. Gower	
1917	Babbling Tongues	Marie Moreau	
1920	Slaves of Pride	Mrs. Leeds	
1921	Her Lord and Master	Mrs. Chazy Bunker	
1923	The Gold Diggers	Cissie Gray	Lost
1925	Sally	Madame Julie Du Fay	

== Broadway performances ==
- Mother Lode (1934)
- White Lilacs (1928-1929)
- My Maryland (1927-1928)
- Nature's Nobleman (1921-1922)
- One Night in Rome (1919-1920)
- Flo-Flo (1917-1918)
- The Chimes of Normandy (1907)
- Mademoiselle Fifi (1899)
- Jacinta (1893-1894)
- Puritania, or The Earl and the Maid of Salem (1892-1893)
- Jolly Students (1891)
- Indigo (1891)
- Apollo, or the Oracle of Delphi (1891)
- The Tyrolean (1891-1892)
- The Mikado (1889-1890)
- Paola (1889)
- Dead or Alive (1889)
- A Strange Case, Dr. Jekyll & Mr.Hyde (1888)
- Narcisse (1886)

== Gallery ==
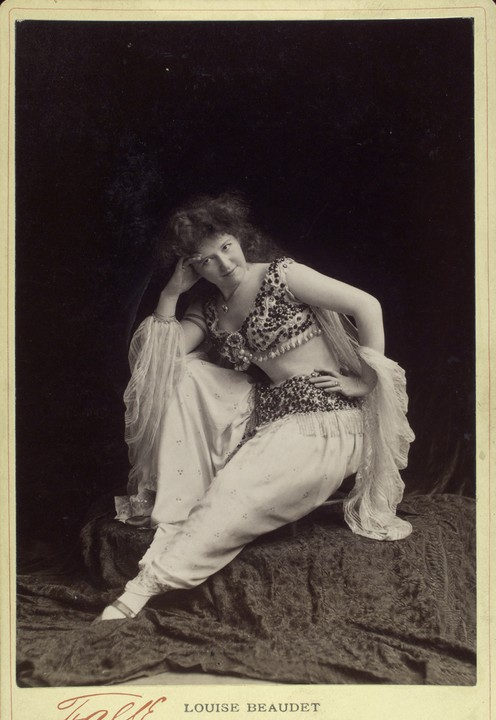
Louise Beaudet, stage actress in harem costume
