= Hell's Highway (1932 film) =

1932 film

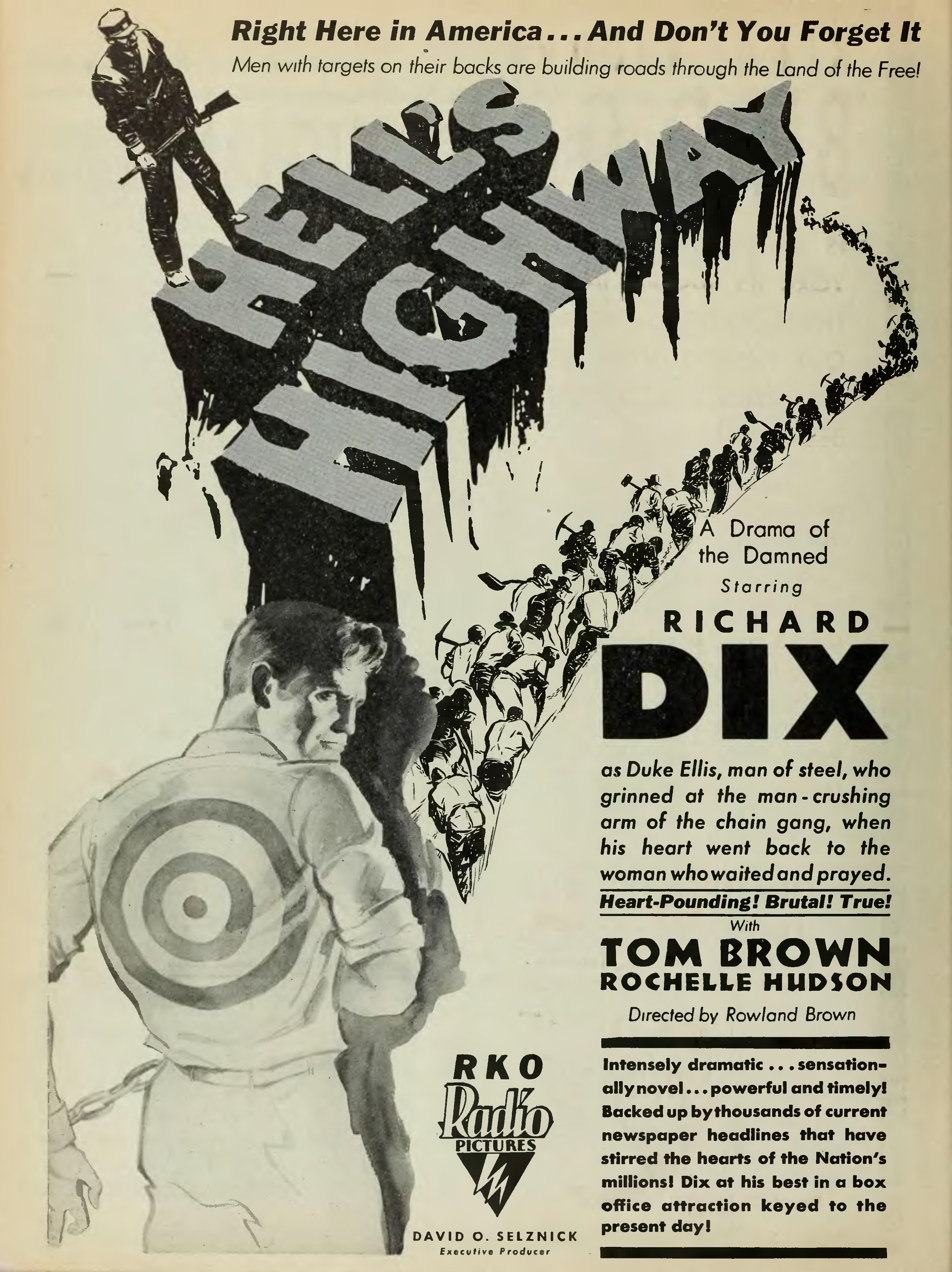
- Hell's Highway ad from The Film Daily, 1932
- Directed by: Rowland Brown; John Cromwell
- Written by: Samuel Ornitz and Robert Tasker and Rowland Brown
- Produced by: David O. Selznick (executive producer)
- Cinematography: Edward Cronjager
- Edited by: William Hamilton
- Music by: Clarence Muse
- Distributed by: RKO Radio Pictures
- Release date: September 23, 1932
- Running time: 62 minutes
- Country: USA
- Language: English
- Budget: $125,000

Hell's Highway is a 1932 American pre-Code drama film directed by Rowland Brown.

== Plot ==
The film centers around brutal conditions in a prison of the Southern United States. Chain gang prisoners forced to construct a "liberty highway" for their overseer chastened under his brutal stewardship. Duke Ellis is the most influential inmate among them. He soon discovers his younger brother has also been incarcerated and joined the chain gang. Soon enough Duke will mastermind a mass riot.

== Cast ==
- Richard Dix as Frank "Duke" Ellis
- Tom Brown as John "Johnny" Ellis
- Rochelle Hudson as Mary Ellen
- C. Henry Gordon as "Blacksnake" Skinner
- Oscar Apfel as William Billings
- Stanley Fields as F.E. Whiteside
- John Arledge as Joe Carter
- Warner Richmond as Captain "Pop-Eye" Jackson
- Charles B. Middleton as Matthew "The Hermit"
- Louise Carter as Mrs. Ellis
- Clarence Muse as Rascal
- Fuzzy Knight as "Society Red"
