= The Price She Paid =

1917 film by Charles Giblyn

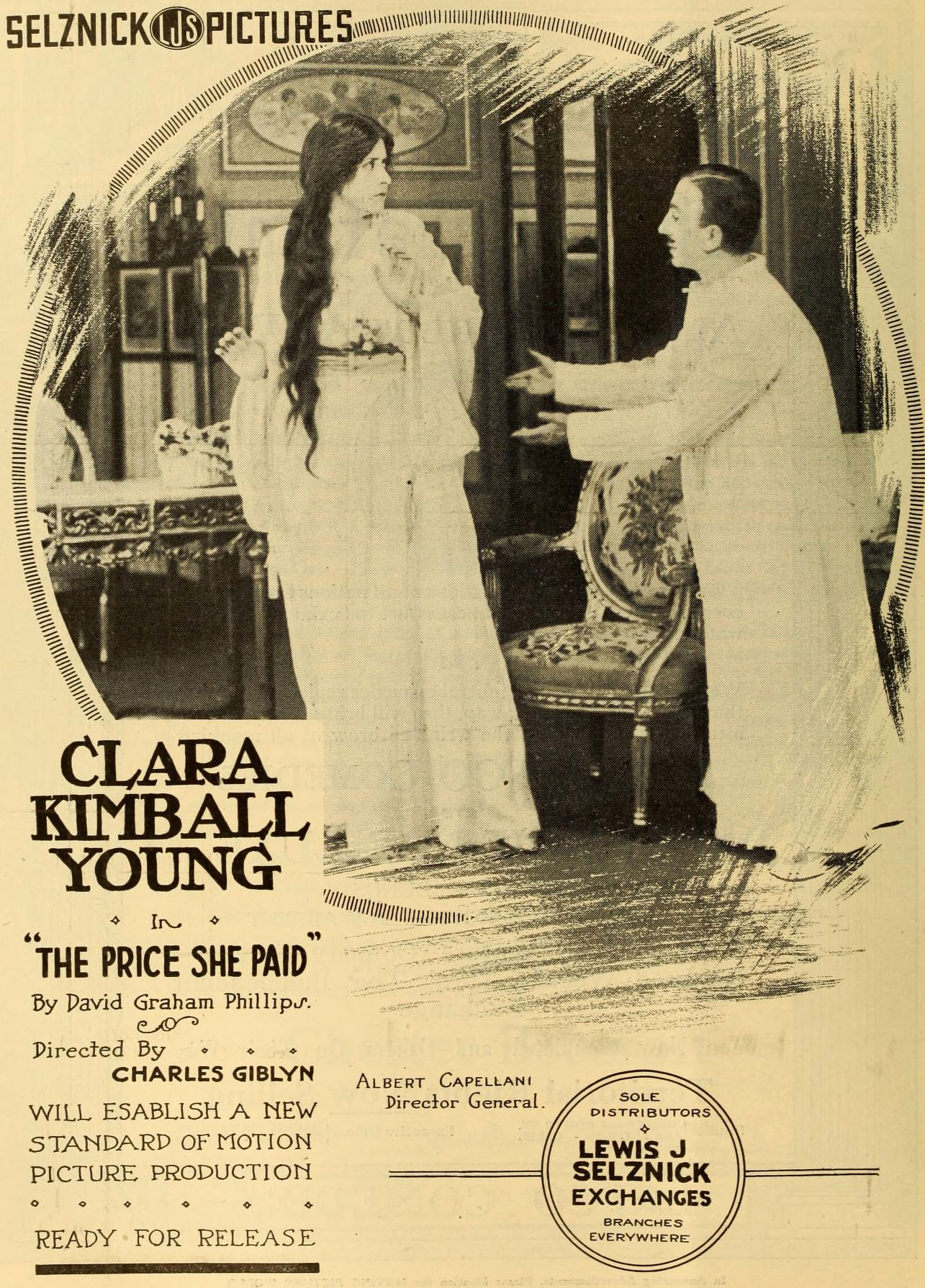
- Directed by: Charles Giblyn
- Written by: David Graham Phillips (Novel); Charles Giblyn
- Produced by: Clara Kimball Young; Lewis J. Selznick
- Starring: Clara Kimball Young; Louise Beaudet; Alan Hale
- Cinematography: Hal Young
- Production company: Clara Kimball Young Film Corporation
- Distributed by: Selznick Pictures
- Release date: February 1917
- Running time: 70 minutes
- Country: United States
- Languages: Silent; English intertitles

The Price She Paid is a 1917 American silent drama film directed by Charles Giblyn and starring Clara Kimball Young, Louise Beaudet and Alan Hale. It was shot at Lewis J. Selznick's Fort Lee studios in New Jersey.

== Cast ==
- Clara Kimball Young as Mildred Gower
- Louise Beaudet as Mrs. Gower
- Cecil Fletcher as Frank Gower
- Charles Bowser as Presbury
- Snitz Edwards as General Siddall
- Alan Hale as Stanley Baird
- David Powell as Donald Keith
- Cesare Gravina as Moldini

== Bibliography ==
- Donald W. McCaffrey & Christopher P. Jacobs. Guide to the Silent Years of American Cinema. Greenwood Publishing, 1999.
