= Anthony E. Wills =

American writer

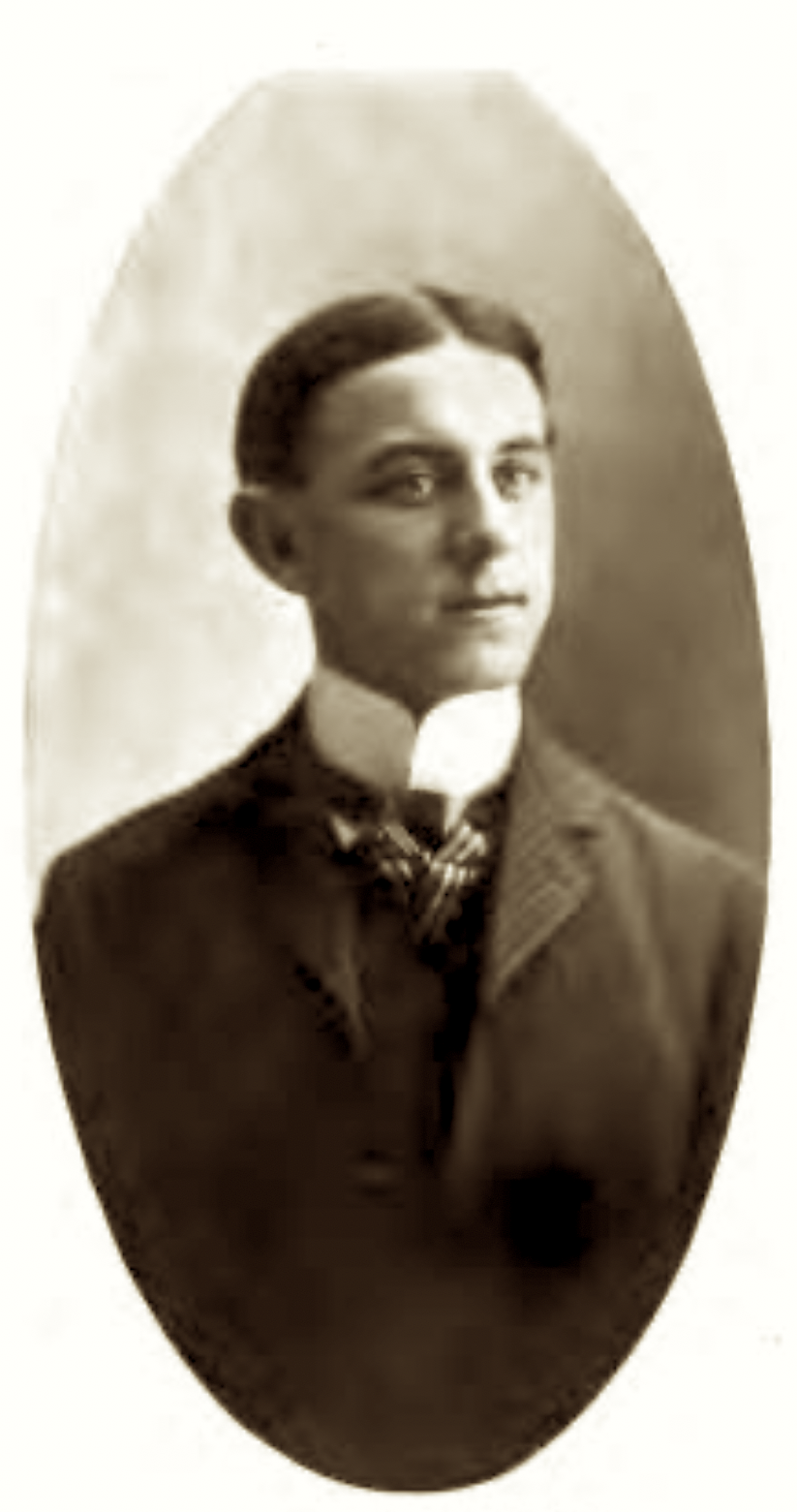
Photograph of Anthony E. Wills, published in 1901

Anthony E. Wills, sometimes given as Anthony E. Willis, (December 1, 1879 – July 25, 1912) was an American playwright, novelist, author of short stories, and theatrical producer. A native of Brooklyn, New York, Wills began his career as an author writing short stories. In 1901 his only novel, Monsieur Paul De Fere, was published by The Abbey Press. From 1902 until his death ten years later he devoted himself to writing plays; producing nearly forty works for the theatre. Several of his plays were performed by the Wills Amusement Company; a professional theatre troupe which Wills founded in 1907. The first play the organization performed was Wills' The Lost Trail which the company brought to Broadway in 1908. After his death in 1912 at the age of 32, Vitagraph Studios purchased the film rights to his entire body of work in 1913. That studio made three silent films based on stories by Wills: A Regiment of Two (1913), Our Wives (1913), and Too Many Husbands (1914).

== Life and career ==
The son of Anthony Wills and Emilia R Wills (née Baltz), Anthony E. Wills was born in Brooklyn, New York on December 1, 1879. He grew up in Williamsburg, Brooklyn where he resided with his mother and his brother. He was educated in the New York City Public Schools district, and spent some time living in Illinois and Wisconsin in the early 1890s. He returned to Brooklyn in 1894. There he was a member of The Dilettante Players, a popular amateur theatre troupe in Brooklyn which would put on plays at the Germania Theatre located at the intersection of Eighth Street and Fourth Avenue.

Wills began his career as an author writing short stories. In 1901 his novel Monsieur Paul De Fere was published by The Abbey Press. He served one term as President of the National Amateur Press Association from 1901 to 1903. The American Academy of Dramatic Arts (AADA) staged the premiere of his play A Round Up at the Carnegie Lyceum inside Carnegie Hall during the 1905–1906 season. On April 17, 1907, the Boston Young Men's Christian Union staged the premiere of Wills' play Blundering Billy with music performed by the Arlington Orchestra.

Wills founded the Wills Amusement Company (WAC) in 1907; a professional theatre troupe which performed his works. His comedy The Lost Trail was given its premiere by the WAC in Patterson, New Jersey on September 18, 1907. Successful, it toured and ultimately had a run at Broadway's West End Theatre where it opened on January 27, 1908. The AADA staged the premieres of two plays by Wills' at the Empire Theatre on Broadway. The first was The Stranger which the school presented on November 5, 1908, and the second was The Indruder, which the school performed on November 19, 1908. A professional production of The Stanger subsequently toured in 1909 in a production starring the actress Alice Leal Pollock.

By 1911 Wills' brother, Louis C. Wills, had joined Anthony as his partner in managing the WAC. At that time the company had two separate theatre troupes touring the country; both of which were performing Anthony's play The Struggle. The Struggle was given its world premiere in Philadelphia on August 14, 1911. The Phi Mu Alpha Sinfonia fraternity at the New England Conservatory of Music staged a production of Wills's Our Wives with the female characters being played by men in drag in May 1911.

Anthony E. Wills died in East Stroudsburg, Pennsylvania on July 25, 1912, after a prolonged illness. Multiple obituaries printed at the time of his death noted that despite his youth at the time of his death, he had achieved a reputation as a writer and producer.

Vitagraph Studios purchased the film rights to all of his works in 1913, the year after his death. He was posthumously credited as the screenwriter of the Vitagraph films Our Wives (1913) A Regiment of Two (1913), and Too Many Husbands (1914). According to one reviewer of the film version of A Regiment of Two, Wills' play had "long been a prime favorite on the stage and has still gained more popularity now that it had been skillfully adapted as a motion picture."

== Works ==
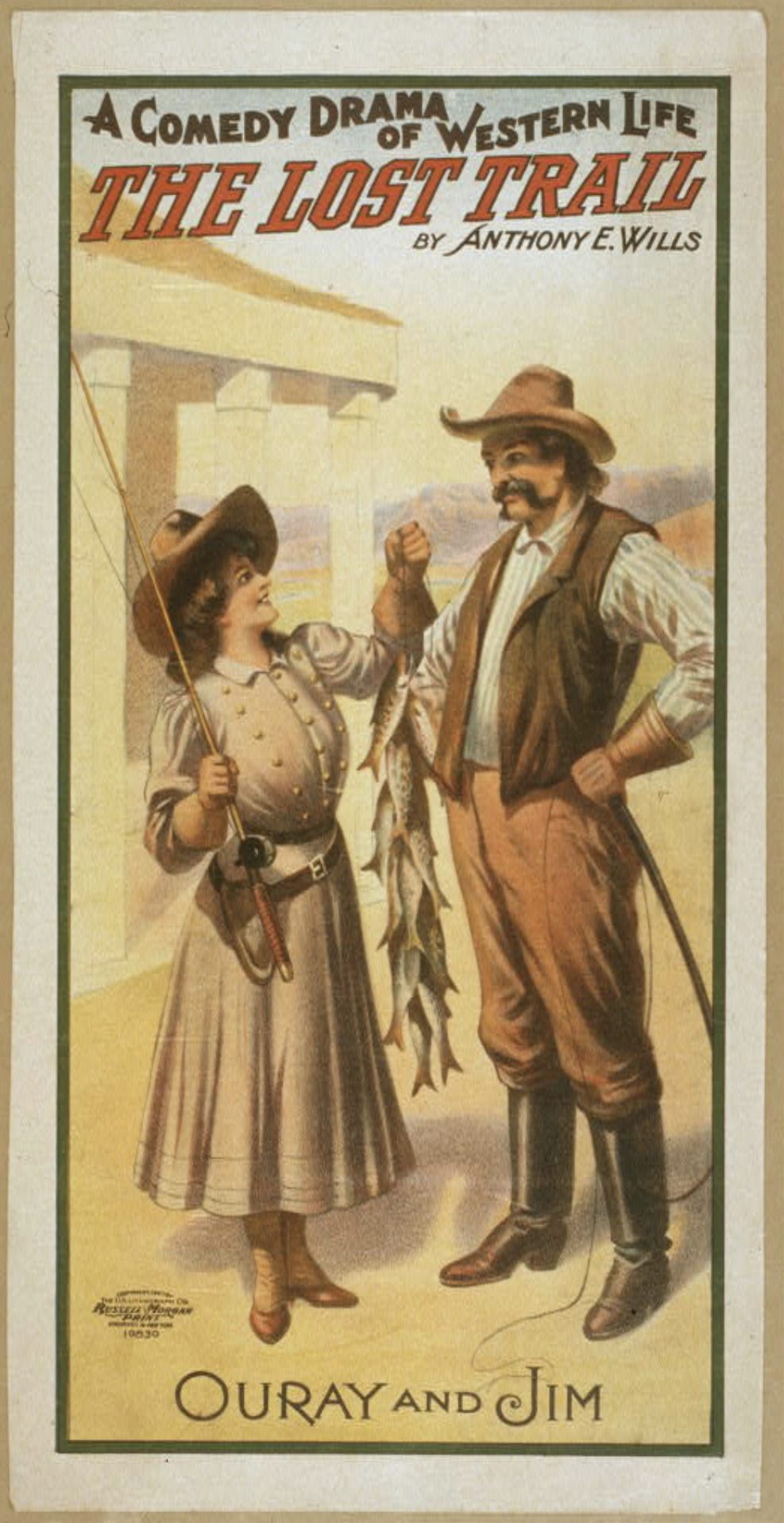
1907 poster for The Lost Trail

=== Novel ===
- Monsieur Paul De Fere (1901, The Abbey Press (New York))

=== Plays ===
1902

- My Friend, the Professor (1902)

1904

- The Man from Tangier, a farce (1904)

1905

- All Charley's Fault, an original farce in two acts (1905)
- Liberty Corners, a rural comedy drama in four acts (1905)
- Oak Farm, a comedy drama in three acts (1905)
- The House Painted White, a comedy in four acts (1905)
- A Round-Up (1905)
- Chattanooga, a story of southland and the story sixties, drama in four acts (1905)

1906

- Benjamin, Benny, and Ben, a farce in one act (1906)
- Taking Chances, a comedy in one act (1906)
- Among the Berkshires; or New England Folks, a rural drama in three acts (1906)
- Fighting for Freedom, a drama in four acts (1906)
- A Count of No Account, a farce comedy in three acts (1906)
- Blundering Billy, a farcical comedy in three acts (1906)

1907

- Burley's Ranch, a drama of the western plain in three acts (1907)
- King's Courier, a farce in one act (1907)
- A Regiment of Two, a farcical comedy in three acts (1907)
- The Lost Trail, a comedy drama of Western life in four acts (1907)
- The Westerner, a play of western military life in four acts (1907)
- College Chums, a three act comedy of college life (1907)
- Father's Doll, a playlet in one act (1907)
- General Faulkner's Daughter, a play of western military life in four acts (1907)

1908

- Quiet Trip, a farce in one act (1908)
- The Matinee Idol, a duologue in one act (1908)
- The Stranger, a comedy drama in four acts (1908)
- Wrongly Accused, a comedy drama of love and adventure in four acts and seven scenes (1908)
- The Intruder, a play in one act (1908)

1909

- The East Siders, a comedy in three acts (1909)
- The Lieutenant and the Cowboy, a play with a military plot and a cowboy hero (1909)
- Heirs at Law, comedy in one act (1909)

1910

- Her Gloves, a farce in three acts (1910)
- Our Wives, a farce in three acts (1910)
- Just Plain Folks, a comedy drama of rural life in three acts (1910)

1911

- Country Folks, a comedy drama in three acts (1911)
- The Struggle, a comedy drama in four acts (1911)
- Gypsy, a drama in three acts (1911)
- Too Many Husbands, a farcical comedy in two acts (1911)

1912

- A Football Romance, college play in four acts (1912)
- Never Again, a farce in three acts (1912)

=== Short stories ===
- "The Queen's Letter"
- "Stratagem"
- "The Portsmouth Light"
- "Memories"
- "The Saddle Inn"
- "A Queer Life Saver"
- "The Artist's Dilemma"
- "His Last Christmas"
