= Too Many Husbands (1914 film) =

1914 film

- Directed by: Sidney Drew
- Based on: Too Many Husbands by Anthony E. Wills
- Starring: Antonio Moreno; Harry Davenport; Sidney Drew
- Production company: Vitagraph Studios
- Distributed by: Vitagraph Studios
- Release date: 28 September 1914
- Running time: 20 minutes
- Country: United States
- Language: English

Too Many Husbands is a 1914 American silent film based on a story by Anthony E. Wills. Made by Vitagraph Studios, it featured the married comic duo Mr. and Mrs. Sidney Drew. Sidney Drew also directed the film. It was released on September 28, 1914.

== Synopsis ==
Arthur Crane sends a deceptive letter to his Uncle Crane claiming that he has just gotten married. Enclosed is a picture of his supposed bride, but in reality it is a picture of Mrs. Brown, the wife of Arthur's landlord, Harry Brown. Uncle Crane, who lives far away from Arthur, is overjoyed at the news, and decides to make a surprise visit to his nephew in order to meet his bride. Arthur, is shocked when his uncle appears at his home, and begs the Browns to help him by maintaining the deception that Mrs. Brown is his wife. They agree, and Mrs Brown poses as Arthur's wife. The plan begins to go wrong when Crane's ward, Dorothy, arrives. Both Arthur and Dorothy have unexpressed feelings for one another, and Dorothy becomes jealous. A comedy of errors ensues, but ultimately all ends happily after the truth is revealed to Uncle Crane.

== Cast ==
- Anthony Moreno as Harry Brown
- Harry Davenport as Uncle Crane
- Sidney Drew as Arthur Crane
- Mrs. Sidney Drew as Dorothy, Crane's Ward (as Jane Morrow)
- Etienne Girardot as Chauncey Chilton
- Lillian Burns as Mollie
- Hughie Mack as Bauer
- Betty Gray as Mrs. Brown (as Miss Gray)
- Ethel Lloyd as Mother-in-Law
